= 1978 Tour de France, Prologue to Stage 11 =

Cycling race stages

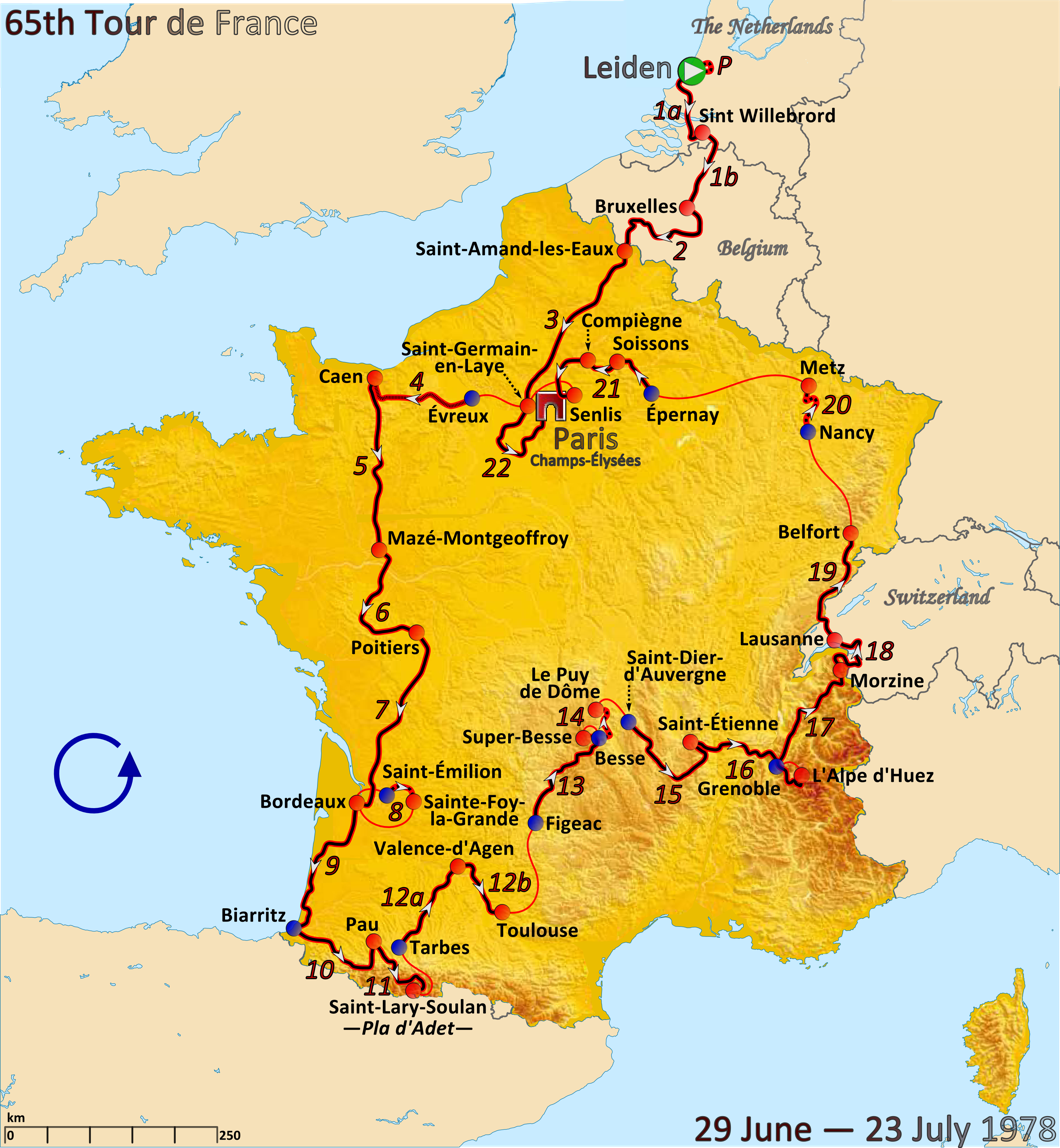
Route of the 1978 Tour de France

The 1978 Tour de France was the 65th edition of the Tour de France, one of cycling's Grand Tours. The Tour began in Leiden, the Netherlands, with a prologue individual time trial on 29 June, and Stage 11 occurred on 11 July with a mountainous stage to Saint-Lary-Soulan Pla d'Adet. The race finished in Paris on 23 July.

== Prologue ==
29 June 1978 – Leiden to Leiden, 5 km (3.1 mi) (ITT)

Due to bad weather, the prologue result did not contribute to the general classification and a yellow jersey wasn't awarded.

Prologue result

Rank	Rider	Team	Time
1	Jan Raas (NED)	TI–Raleigh	6' 38"
2	Gerrie Knetemann (NED)	TI–Raleigh	+ 2"
3	Joop Zoetemelk (NED)	Miko–Mercier–Hutchinson	+ 4"
4	Hennie Kuiper (NED)	TI–Raleigh	+ 8"
5	Joseph Bruyère (BEL)	Fiat	+ 10"
6	Yves Hézard (FRA)	Peugeot–Esso–Michelin	+ 16"
7	Freddy Maertens (BEL)	Velda–Lono–Flandria	+ 18"
8	Daniel Gisiger (SUI)	Lejeune–BP	+ 19"
9	Bernard Hinault (FRA)	Renault–Gitane–Campagnolo	s.t.
10	Klaus-Peter Thaler (FRG)	TI–Raleigh	+ 20"

== Stage 1a ==
30 June 1978 – Leiden to Sint Willebrord, 135 km (84 mi)

Stage 1a result and general classification after stage 1a

Rank	Rider	Team	Time
1	Jan Raas (NED)	TI–Raleigh	3h 24' 21"
2	Freddy Maertens (BEL)	Velda–Lono–Flandria	+ 1"
3	Jacques Esclassan (FRA)	Peugeot–Esso–Michelin	s.t.
4	Walter Planckaert (BEL)	C&A	s.t.
5	Gerben Karstens (NED)	TI–Raleigh	s.t.
6	Jean-François Pescheux (FRA)	Jobo–Superia	s.t.
7	Jean-Louis Gauthier (FRA)	Lejeune–BP	s.t.
8	Sean Kelly (IRL)	Velda–Lono–Flandria	s.t.
9	Pierre Bazzo (FRA)	Lejeune–BP	s.t.
10	Yvon Bertin (FRA)	Renault–Gitane–Campagnolo	s.t.

== Stage 1b ==
30 June 1978 – Sint Willebrord to Brussels, 100 km (62 mi)

Stage 1b result

Rank	Rider	Team	Time
1	Walter Planckaert (BEL)	C&A	2h 22' 14"
2	Freddy Maertens (BEL)	Velda–Lono–Flandria	s.t.
3	Jean-François Pescheux (FRA)	Jobo–Superia	s.t.
4	Klaus-Peter Thaler (FRG)	TI–Raleigh	s.t.
5	Jesús Suárez Cueva (ESP)	Kas–Campagnolo	s.t.
6	Jacques Esclassan (FRA)	Peugeot–Esso–Michelin	s.t.
7	Jacques Bossis (FRA)	Renault–Gitane–Campagnolo	s.t.
8	Yvon Bertin (FRA)	Renault–Gitane–Campagnolo	s.t.
9	Willy Teirlinck (BEL)	Renault–Gitane–Campagnolo	s.t.
10	Jan Raas (NED)	TI–Raleigh	s.t.

General classification after stage 1b

Rank	Rider	Team	Time
1	Jan Raas (NED)	TI–Raleigh	5h 46' 35"
2	Freddy Maertens (BEL)	Velda–Lono–Flandria	+ 1"
3	Walter Planckaert (BEL)	C&A	s.t.
4	Jean-François Pescheux (FRA)	Jobo–Superia	s.t.
5	Jacques Esclassan (FRA)	Peugeot–Esso–Michelin	s.t.
6	Yvon Bertin (FRA)	Renault–Gitane–Campagnolo	s.t.
7	Jacques Bossis (FRA)	Renault–Gitane–Campagnolo	s.t.
8	Jean-Louis Gauthier (FRA)	Lejeune–BP	s.t.
9	Klaus-Peter Thaler (FRG)	TI–Raleigh	s.t.
10	Willy Teirlinck (BEL)	Renault–Gitane–Campagnolo	s.t.

== Stage 2 ==
1 July 1978 – Brussels to Saint-Amand-les-Eaux, 199 km (124 mi)

Stage 2 result

Rank	Rider	Team	Time
1	Jacques Esclassan (FRA)	Peugeot–Esso–Michelin	5h 21' 31"
2	Yvon Bertin (FRA)	Renault–Gitane–Campagnolo	s.t.
3	Freddy Maertens (BEL)	Velda–Lono–Flandria	s.t.
4	Walter Planckaert (BEL)	C&A	s.t.
5	Klaus-Peter Thaler (FRG)	TI–Raleigh	s.t.
6	Jean-François Pescheux (FRA)	Jobo–Superia	s.t.
7	Jacques Bossis (FRA)	Renault–Gitane–Campagnolo	s.t.
8	Mariano Martínez (FRA)	Jobo–Superia	s.t.
9	Jan Raas (NED)	TI–Raleigh	s.t.
10	Guy Sibille (FRA)	Peugeot–Esso–Michelin	s.t.

General classification after stage 2

Rank	Rider	Team	Time
1	Jan Raas (NED)	TI–Raleigh	11h 08' 06"
2	Freddy Maertens (BEL)	Velda–Lono–Flandria	+ 1"
3	Walter Planckaert (BEL)	C&A	s.t.
4	Jacques Esclassan (FRA)	Peugeot–Esso–Michelin	s.t.
5	Jean-François Pescheux (FRA)	Jobo–Superia	s.t.
6	Yvon Bertin (FRA)	Renault–Gitane–Campagnolo	s.t.
7	Jacques Bossis (FRA)	Renault–Gitane–Campagnolo	s.t.
8	Klaus-Peter Thaler (FRG)	TI–Raleigh	s.t.
9	André Mollet (FRA)	Miko–Mercier–Hutchinson	s.t.
10	Guy Sibille (FRA)	Peugeot–Esso–Michelin	s.t.

== Stage 3 ==
2 July 1978 – Saint-Amand-les-Eaux to Saint-Germain-en-Laye, 244 km (152 mi)

Stage 3 result

Rank	Rider	Team	Time
1	Klaus-Peter Thaler (FRG)	TI–Raleigh	7h 25' 42"
2	Jacques Bossis (FRA)	Renault–Gitane–Campagnolo	s.t.
3	Patrick Friou (FRA)	Lejeune–BP	+ 6"
4	Joseph Bruyère (BEL)	C&A	s.t.
5	Gerrie Knetemann (NED)	TI–Raleigh	s.t.
6	Maurice Le Guilloux (FRA)	Miko–Mercier–Hutchinson	s.t.
7	René Bittinger (FRA)	Velda–Lono–Flandria	s.t.
8	Régis Ovion (FRA)	Peugeot–Esso–Michelin	s.t.
9	Jean-Pierre Danguillaume (FRA)	Peugeot–Esso–Michelin	s.t.
10	Paul Sherwen (GBR)	Fiat–La France	+ 1' 38"

General classification after stage 3

Rank	Rider	Team	Time
1	Jacques Bossis (FRA)	Renault–Gitane–Campagnolo	18h 33' 29"
2	Klaus-Peter Thaler (FRG)	TI–Raleigh	+ 20"
3	René Bittinger (FRA)	Velda–Lono–Flandria	s.t.
4	Joseph Bruyère (FRA)	C&A	s.t.
5	Régis Ovion (FRA)	Peugeot–Esso–Michelin	s.t.
6	Gerrie Knetemann (NED)	TI–Raleigh	s.t.
7	Jean-Pierre Danguillaume (FRA)	Peugeot–Esso–Michelin	+ 30"
8	Maurice Le Guilloux (FRA)	Miko–Mercier–Hutchinson	+ 43"
9	Paul Sherwen (GBR)	Fiat–La France	+ 2' 20"
10	Jan Raas (NED)	TI–Raleigh	+ 3' 24"

== Stage 4 ==
3 July 1978 – Évreux to Caen, 153 km (95 mi) (TTT)

Stage 4 result

Rank	Team	Time
1	TI–Raleigh	3h 39' 07"
2	C&A	+ 7"
3	Miko–Mercier–Hutchinson	+ 4' 19"
4	Renault–Gitane–Campagnolo	+ 5' 15"
5	Velda–Lono–Flandria	+ 6' 20"
6	Lejeune–BP	+ 9' 04"
7	Peugeot–Esso–Michelin	+ 13' 20"
8	Fiat–La France	+ 19' 22"
9	Teka	+ 23' 39"
10	Jobo–Superia	+ 23' 48"

General classification after stage 4

Rank	Rider	Team	Time
1	Klaus-Peter Thaler (FRG)	TI–Raleigh	18h 31' 49"
2	Gerrie Knetemann (NED)	TI–Raleigh	+ 6"
3	Joseph Bruyère (FRA)	C&A	+ 46"
4	Jacques Bossis (FRA)	Renault–Gitane–Campagnolo	+ 1' 00"
5	Maurice Le Guilloux (FRA)	Miko–Mercier–Hutchinson	+ 1' 23"
6	René Bittinger (FRA)	Velda–Lono–Flandria	+ 1' 46"
7	Régis Ovion (FRA)	Peugeot–Esso–Michelin	+ 2' 06"
8	Jean-Pierre Danguillaume (FRA)	Peugeot–Esso–Michelin	+ 2' 16"
9	Hennie Kuiper (NED)	TI–Raleigh	+ 3' 05"
10	Henk Lubberding (NED)	TI–Raleigh	s.t.

== Stage 5 ==
4 July 1978 – Caen to Mazé–Montgeoffroy, 244 km (152 mi)

Stage 5 result

Rank	Rider	Team	Time
1	Freddy Maertens (BEL)	Velda–Lono–Flandria	6h 00' 16"
2	Gerben Karstens (NED)	TI–Raleigh	s.t.
3	Jacques Esclassan (FRA)	Peugeot–Esso–Michelin	s.t.
4	Yvon Bertin (FRA)	Renault–Gitane–Campagnolo	s.t.
5	Jean-François Pescheux (FRA)	Jobo–Superia	s.t.
6	Régis Delépine (FRA)	Peugeot–Esso–Michelin	s.t.
7	Dominique Sanders (FRA)	Fiat–La France	s.t.
8	Joël Gallopin (FRA)	Lejeune–BP	s.t.
9	Philippe Durel (FRA)	Jobo–Superia	s.t.
10	Alain Patritti (FRA)	Jobo–Superia	s.t.

General classification after stage 5

Rank	Rider	Team	Time
1	Klaus-Peter Thaler (FRG)	TI–Raleigh	25h 32' 05"
2	Gerrie Knetemann (NED)	TI–Raleigh	+ 6"
3	Joseph Bruyère (FRA)	C&A	+ 46"
4	Jacques Bossis (FRA)	Renault–Gitane–Campagnolo	+ 1' 00"
5	Maurice Le Guilloux (FRA)	Miko–Mercier–Hutchinson	+ 1' 23"
6	René Bittinger (FRA)	Velda–Lono–Flandria	+ 1' 46"
7	Régis Ovion (FRA)	Peugeot–Esso–Michelin	+ 2' 06"
8	Jean-Pierre Danguillaume (FRA)	Peugeot–Esso–Michelin	+ 2' 16"
9	Hennie Kuiper (NED)	TI–Raleigh	+ 3' 05"
10	Henk Lubberding (NED)	TI–Raleigh	s.t.

== Stage 6 ==
5 July 1978 – Mazé–Montgeoffroy to Poitiers, 162 km (101 mi)

Stage 6 result

Rank	Rider	Team	Time
1	Sean Kelly (IRL)	Velda–Lono–Flandria	4h 02' 24"
2	Gerrie Knetemann (NED)	TI–Raleigh	s.t.
3	René Bittinger (FRA)	Velda–Lono–Flandria	s.t.
4	Joseph Bruyère (BEL)	C&A	s.t.
5	Sven-Åke Nilsson (SWE)	Miko–Mercier–Hutchinson	s.t.
6	Jacques Esclassan (FRA)	Peugeot–Esso–Michelin	+ 27"
7	Walter Planckaert (BEL)	C&A	s.t.
8	Guy Sibille (FRA)	Peugeot–Esso–Michelin	s.t.
9	Jacques Bossis (FRA)	Renault–Gitane–Campagnolo	s.t.
10	Bernard Bourreau (FRA)	Peugeot–Esso–Michelin	s.t.

General classification after stage 6

Rank	Rider	Team	Time
1	Gerrie Knetemann (NED)	TI–Raleigh	29h 34' 35"
2	Klaus-Peter Thaler (FRG)	TI–Raleigh	+ 21"
3	Joseph Bruyère (FRA)	C&A	+ 40"
4	Jacques Bossis (FRA)	Renault–Gitane–Campagnolo	+ 1' 21"
5	René Bittinger (FRA)	Velda–Lono–Flandria	+ 1' 40"
6	Maurice Le Guilloux (FRA)	Miko–Mercier–Hutchinson	+ 1' 44"
7	Régis Ovion (FRA)	Peugeot–Esso–Michelin	+ 2' 27"
8	Jean-Pierre Danguillaume (FRA)	Peugeot–Esso–Michelin	+ 2' 37"
9	Wilfried Wesemael (BEL)	TI–Raleigh	+ 3' 26"
10	Henk Lubberding (NED)	TI–Raleigh	s.t.

== Stage 7 ==
6 July 1978 – Poitiers to Bordeaux, 242 km (150 mi)

Stage 7 result

Rank	Rider	Team	Time
1	Freddy Maertens (BEL)	Velda–Lono–Flandria	7h 01' 08"
2	Jacques Esclassan (FRA)	Peugeot–Esso–Michelin	s.t.
3	Walter Planckaert (BEL)	C&A	s.t.
4	Klaus-Peter Thaler (FRG)	TI–Raleigh	s.t.
5	Jean-François Pescheux (FRA)	Jobo–Superia	s.t.
6	Jacques Bossis (FRA)	Renault–Gitane–Campagnolo	s.t.
7	Charles Rouxel (FRA)	Miko–Mercier–Hutchinson	s.t.
8	Yvon Bertin (FRA)	Renault–Gitane–Campagnolo	s.t.
9	André Mollet (FRA)	Miko–Mercier–Hutchinson	s.t.
10	Barry Hoban (GBR)	Miko–Mercier–Hutchinson	s.t.

General classification after stage 7

Rank	Rider	Team	Time
1	Gerrie Knetemann (NED)	TI–Raleigh	36h 35' 42"
2	Klaus-Peter Thaler (FRG)	TI–Raleigh	+ 22"
3	Joseph Bruyère (FRA)	C&A	+ 41"
4	Jacques Bossis (FRA)	Renault–Gitane–Campagnolo	+ 1' 21"
5	René Bittinger (FRA)	Velda–Lono–Flandria	+ 1' 41"
6	Maurice Le Guilloux (FRA)	Miko–Mercier–Hutchinson	+ 1' 45"
7	Régis Ovion (FRA)	Peugeot–Esso–Michelin	+ 2' 28"
8	Jean-Pierre Danguillaume (FRA)	Peugeot–Esso–Michelin	+ 2' 38"
9	Hennie Kuiper (NED)	TI–Raleigh	+ 3' 27"
10	Wilfried Wesemael (BEL)	TI–Raleigh	s.t.

== Stage 8 ==
7 July 1978 – Saint-Émilion to Sainte-Foy-la-Grande, 59 km (37 mi) (ITT)

Stage 8 result

Rank	Rider	Team	Time
1	Bernard Hinault (FRA)	Renault–Gitane–Campagnolo	1h 22' 01"
2	Joseph Bruyère (FRA)	Fiat	+ 34"
3	Freddy Maertens (BEL)	Velda–Lono–Flandria	+ 56"
4	Joop Zoetemelk (NED)	Miko–Mercier–Hutchinson	+ 59"
5	Michel Pollentier (BEL)	Velda–Lono–Flandria	+ 1' 22"
6	Michel Laurent (FRA)	Peugeot–Esso–Michelin	+ 1' 33"
7	Jacques Bossis (FRA)	Renault–Gitane–Campagnolo	+ 2' 00"
8	Jean-Luc Vandenbroucke (BEL)	Peugeot–Esso–Michelin	+ 2' 29"
9	Joaquim Agostinho (POR)	Velda–Lono–Flandria	+ 2' 40"
10	Paul Wellens (BEL)	TI–Raleigh	+ 2' 56"

General classification after stage 8

Rank	Rider	Team	Time
1	Joseph Bruyère (FRA)	C&A	37h 58' 58"
2	Jacques Bossis (FRA)	Renault–Gitane–Campagnolo	+ 2' 07"
3	Gerrie Knetemann (NED)	TI–Raleigh	+ 2' 56"
4	Bernard Hinault (FRA)	Renault–Gitane–Campagnolo	+ 3' 32"
5	Joop Zoetemelk (NED)	Miko–Mercier–Hutchinson	+ 4' 11"
6	Maurice Le Guilloux (FRA)	Miko–Mercier–Hutchinson	+ 4' 36"
7	Freddy Maertens (BEL)	Velda–Lono–Flandria	+ 4' 48"
8	Jean-Pierre Danguillaume (FRA)	Peugeot–Esso–Michelin	+ 4' 58"
9	Klaus-Peter Thaler (FRG)	TI–Raleigh	+ 5' 05"
10	Hennie Kuiper (NED)	TI–Raleigh	+ 5' 11"

== Stage 9 ==
8 July 1978 – Bordeaux to Biarritz, 233 km (145 mi)

Stage 9 result

Rank	Rider	Team	Time
1	Miguel María Lasa (ESP)	Teka	6h 43' 10"
2	Jan Raas (NED)	TI–Raleigh	s.t.
3	Marc Demeyer (BEL)	Velda–Lono–Flandria	s.t.
4	Jean-Pierre Danguillaume (FRA)	Peugeot–Esso–Michelin	s.t.
5	Klaus-Peter Thaler (FRG)	TI–Raleigh	s.t.
6	Walter Planckaert (BEL)	C&A	s.t.
7	Yvon Bertin (FRA)	Renault–Gitane–Campagnolo	s.t.
8	Jacques Esclassan (FRA)	Peugeot–Esso–Michelin	s.t.
9	Dominique Sanders (FRA)	Fiat–La France	s.t.
10	Jean-René Bernaudeau (FRA)	Renault–Gitane–Campagnolo	s.t.

General classification after stage 9

Rank	Rider	Team	Time
1	Joseph Bruyère (FRA)	C&A	44h 42' 08"
2	Jacques Bossis (FRA)	Renault–Gitane–Campagnolo	+ 2' 07"
3	Gerrie Knetemann (NED)	TI–Raleigh	+ 2' 56"
4	Bernard Hinault (FRA)	Renault–Gitane–Campagnolo	+ 3' 32"
5	Joop Zoetemelk (NED)	Miko–Mercier–Hutchinson	+ 4' 11"
6	Maurice Le Guilloux (FRA)	Miko–Mercier–Hutchinson	+ 4' 36"
7	Freddy Maertens (BEL)	Velda–Lono–Flandria	+ 4' 48"
8	Jean-Pierre Danguillaume (FRA)	Peugeot–Esso–Michelin	+ 4' 58"
9	Klaus-Peter Thaler (FRG)	TI–Raleigh	+ 5' 05"
10	Hennie Kuiper (NED)	TI–Raleigh	+ 5' 11"

== Rest day 1 ==
9 July 1978 – Biarritz

== Stage 10 ==
10 July 1978 – Biarritz to Pau, 192 km (119 mi)

Stage 10 result

Rank	Rider	Team	Time
1	Henk Lubberding (NED)	TI–Raleigh	5h 46' 54"
2	Alain Patritti (FRA)	Jobo–Superia	+ 30"
3	Jan Raas (NED)	TI–Raleigh	s.t.
4	Pierre-Raymond Villemiane (FRA)	Renault–Gitane–Campagnolo	s.t.
5	Freddy Maertens (BEL)	Velda–Lono–Flandria	s.t.
6	Jacques Bossis (FRA)	Renault–Gitane–Campagnolo	s.t.
7	Mariano Martínez (FRA)	Jobo–Superia	s.t.
8	Bernard Bourreau (FRA)	Peugeot–Esso–Michelin	s.t.
9	Yves Hézard (FRA)	Peugeot–Esso–Michelin	s.t.
10	Roger Legeay (FRA)	Lejeune–BP	s.t.

General classification after stage 10

Rank	Rider	Team	Time
1	Joseph Bruyère (FRA)	C&A	50h 29' 32"
2	Jacques Bossis (FRA)	Renault–Gitane–Campagnolo	+ 2' 07"
3	Bernard Hinault (FRA)	Renault–Gitane–Campagnolo	+ 3' 32"
4	Joop Zoetemelk (NED)	Miko–Mercier–Hutchinson	+ 4' 11"
5	Freddy Maertens (BEL)	Velda–Lono–Flandria	+ 4' 48"
6	Jean-Pierre Danguillaume (FRA)	Peugeot–Esso–Michelin	+ 4' 58"
7	Hennie Kuiper (NED)	TI–Raleigh	+ 5' 11"
8	Michel Pollentier (BEL)	Velda–Lono–Flandria	+ 5' 14"
9	Michel Laurent (FRA)	Peugeot–Esso–Michelin	+ 5' 45"
10	Henk Lubberding (NED)	TI–Raleigh	+ 5' 46"

== Stage 11 ==
11 July 1978 – Pau to Saint-Lary-Soulan Pla d'Adet, 161 km (100 mi)

Stage 11 result

Rank	Rider	Team	Time
1	Mariano Martínez (FRA)	Jobo–Superia	5h 47' 26"
2	Bernard Hinault (FRA)	Renault–Gitane–Campagnolo	+ 5"
3	Michel Pollentier (BEL)	Velda–Lono–Flandria	s.t.
4	Joop Zoetemelk (NED)	Miko–Mercier–Hutchinson	+ 19"
5	Joaquim Agostinho (POR)	Velda–Lono–Flandria	+ 1' 28"
6	Hennie Kuiper (NED)	TI–Raleigh	+ 1' 29"
7	Christian Seznec (FRA)	Miko–Mercier–Hutchinson	+ 2' 21"
8	Francisco Galdós (ESP)	Kas–Campagnolo	+ 2' 30"
9	Raymond Martin (FRA)	Miko–Mercier–Hutchinson	+ 2' 31"
10	Joseph Bruyère (BEL)	C&A	s.t.

General classification after stage 11

Rank	Rider	Team	Time
1	Joseph Bruyère (FRA)	C&A	56h 19' 30"
2	Bernard Hinault (FRA)	Renault–Gitane–Campagnolo	+ 1' 05"
3	Joop Zoetemelk (NED)	Miko–Mercier–Hutchinson	+ 1' 58"
4	Michel Pollentier (BEL)	Velda–Lono–Flandria	+ 2' 47"
5	Hennie Kuiper (NED)	TI–Raleigh	+ 4' 08"
6	Joaquim Agostinho (POR)	Velda–Lono–Flandria	+ 5' 48"
7	Freddy Maertens (BEL)	Velda–Lono–Flandria	+ 6' 25"
8	Mariano Martínez (FRA)	Jobo–Superia	+ 6' 34"
9	Michel Laurent (FRA)	Peugeot–Esso–Michelin	+ 7' 15"
10	Francisco Galdós (ESP)	Kas–Campagnolo	+ 7' 39"
