= 1978 Tour de France, Stage 12a to Stage 22 =

Cycling race stages

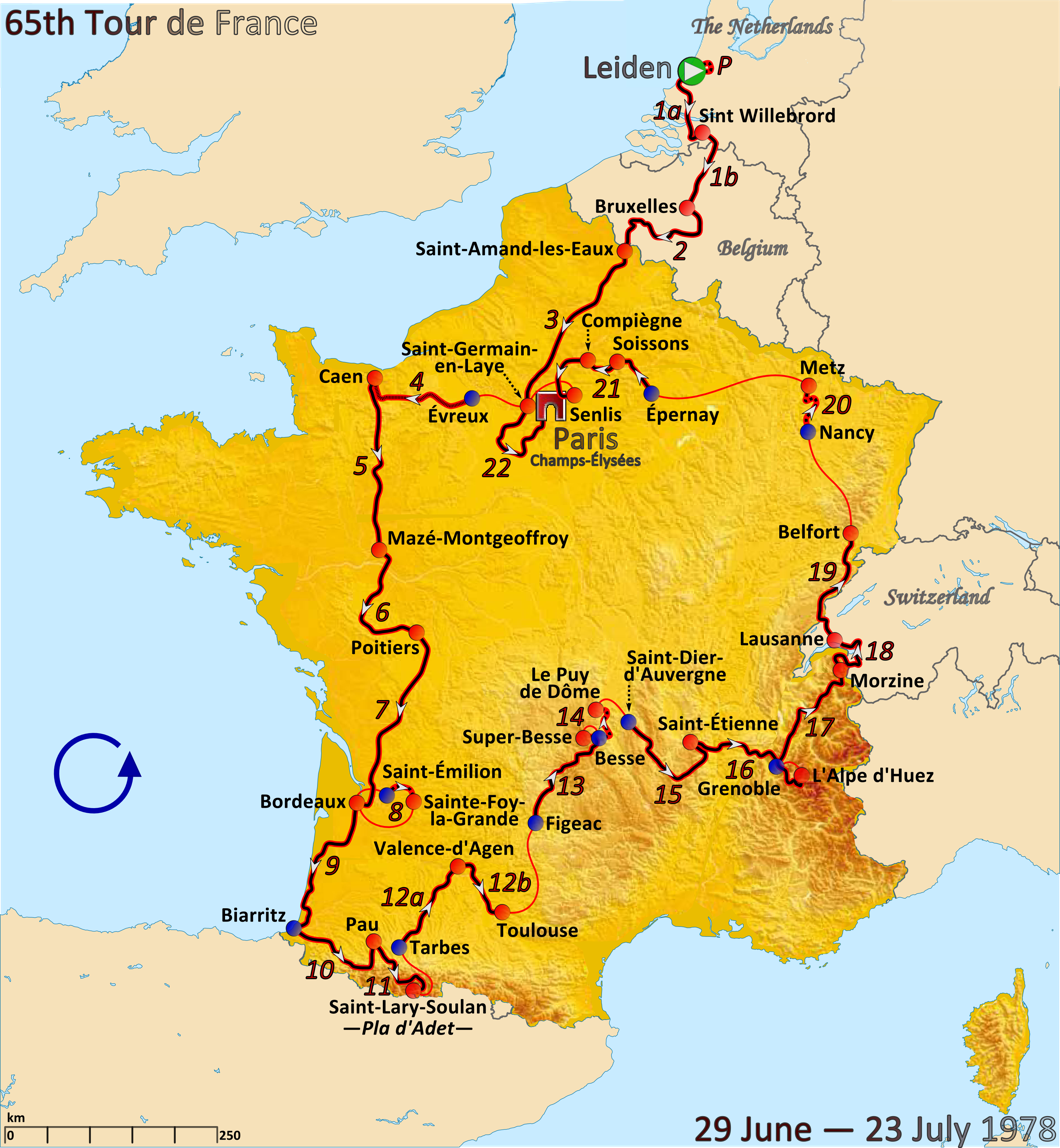
Route of the 1978 Tour de France

The 1978 Tour de France was the 65th edition of the Tour de France, one of cycling's Grand Tours. The Tour began in Leiden, the Netherlands, with a prologue individual time trial on 29 June, and Stage 12a occurred on 12 July with a flat stage from Tarbes. The race finished in Paris on 23 July.

== Stage 12a ==
12 July 1978 – Tarbes to Valence d'Agen, 158 km (98 mi)

The stage was neutralised after a protest, by the peloton, about split stages. The peloton rode slowly throughout the stage, and came to a stop 100 m (330 ft) before the finish line. The riders then dismounted their bikes, crossing the finish line on foot, and the stage was cancelled by the race commissaires.

== Stage 12b ==
12 July 1978 – Valence d'Agen to Toulouse, 96 km (60 mi)

Stage 12b result

| Rank | Rider | Team | Time |
|---|---|---|---|
| 1 | Jacques Esclassan (FRA) | Peugeot–Esso–Michelin | 2h 19' 12" |
| 2 | Jan Raas (NED) | TI–Raleigh | s.t. |
| 3 | Freddy Maertens (BEL) | Velda–Lono–Flandria | s.t. |
| 4 | Régis Delépine (FRA) | Peugeot–Esso–Michelin | s.t. |
| 5 | Gerben Karstens (NED) | TI–Raleigh | s.t. |
| 6 | Jean-Louis Gauthier (FRA) | Lejeune–BP | s.t. |
| 7 | Willy Teirlinck (BEL) | Renault–Gitane–Campagnolo | s.t. |
| 8 | Guy Sibille (FRA) | Peugeot–Esso–Michelin | s.t. |
| 9 | Yvon Bertin (FRA) | Renault–Gitane–Campagnolo | s.t. |
| 10 | Jean-Jacques Fussien (FRA) | Fiat–La France | s.t. |

General classification after stage 12b

| Rank | Rider | Team | Time |
|---|---|---|---|
| 1 | Joseph Bruyère (BEL) | C&A | 58h 38' 42" |
| 2 | Bernard Hinault (FRA) | Renault–Gitane–Campagnolo | + 1' 05" |
| 3 | Joop Zoetemelk (NED) | Miko–Mercier–Hutchinson | + 1' 58" |
| 4 | Michel Pollentier (BEL) | Velda–Lono–Flandria | + 2' 47" |
| 5 | Hennie Kuiper (NED) | TI–Raleigh | + 4' 08" |
| 6 | Joaquim Agostinho (POR) | Velda–Lono–Flandria | + 5' 48" |
| 7 | Freddy Maertens (BEL) | Velda–Lono–Flandria | + 6' 25" |
| 8 | Mariano Martínez (FRA) | Jobo–Superia | + 6' 34" |
| 9 | Michel Laurent (FRA) | Peugeot–Esso–Michelin | + 7' 15" |
| 10 | Francisco Galdós (ESP) | Kas–Campagnolo | + 7' 39" |

== Stage 13 ==
13 July 1978 – Figeac to Super Besse, 221 km (137 mi)

Stage 13 result

| Rank | Rider | Team | Time |
|---|---|---|---|
| 1 | Paul Wellens (BEL) | TI–Raleigh | 6h 43' 49" |
| 2 | Michel Laurent (FRA) | Peugeot–Esso–Michelin | + 1' 30" |
| 3 | Joaquim Agostinho (POR) | Velda–Lono–Flandria | + 1' 31" |
| 4 | Bernard Hinault (FRA) | Renault–Gitane–Campagnolo | + 2' 07" |
| 5 | Michel Pollentier (BEL) | Velda–Lono–Flandria | s.t. |
| 6 | Joop Zoetemelk (NED) | Miko–Mercier–Hutchinson | s.t. |
| 7 | Joseph Bruyère (BEL) | C&A | s.t. |
| 8 | Hennie Kuiper (NED) | TI–Raleigh | s.t. |
| 9 | Lucien Van Impe (BEL) | C&A | s.t. |
| 10 | Christian Seznec (FRA) | Miko–Mercier–Hutchinson | + 2' 19" |

General classification after stage 13

| Rank | Rider | Team | Time |
|---|---|---|---|
| 1 | Joseph Bruyère (BEL) | C&A | 65h 24' 38" |
| 2 | Bernard Hinault (FRA) | Renault–Gitane–Campagnolo | + 1' 05" |
| 3 | Joop Zoetemelk (NED) | Miko–Mercier–Hutchinson | + 1' 58" |
| 4 | Michel Pollentier (BEL) | Velda–Lono–Flandria | + 2' 47" |
| 5 | Hennie Kuiper (NED) | TI–Raleigh | + 4' 08" |
| 6 | Joaquim Agostinho (POR) | Velda–Lono–Flandria | + 5' 13" |
| 7 | Paul Wellens (BEL) | TI–Raleigh | + 6' 36" |
| 8 | Michel Laurent (FRA) | Peugeot–Esso–Michelin | + 6' 38" |
| 9 | Mariano Martínez (FRA) | Jobo–Superia | + 6' 46" |
| 10 | Freddy Maertens (BEL) | Velda–Lono–Flandria | + 7' 21" |

== Stage 14 ==
14 July 1978 – Besse-en-Chandesse to Puy de Dôme, 52 km (32 mi) (ITT)

Stage 14 result

| Rank | Rider | Team | Time |
|---|---|---|---|
| 1 | Joop Zoetemelk (NED) | Miko–Mercier–Hutchinson | 1h 25' 51" |
| 2 | Michel Pollentier (BEL) | Velda–Lono–Flandria | + 46" |
| 3 | Joseph Bruyère (BEL) | C&A | + 55" |
| 4 | Bernard Hinault (FRA) | Renault–Gitane–Campagnolo | + 1' 40" |
| 5 | Joaquim Agostinho (POR) | Velda–Lono–Flandria | + 2' 02" |
| 6 | Lucien Van Impe (BEL) | C&A | + 2' 49" |
| 7 | Hennie Kuiper (NED) | TI–Raleigh | + 4' 02" |
| 8 | Raymond Martin (FRA) | Miko–Mercier–Hutchinson | + 4' 42" |
| 9 | Mariano Martínez (FRA) | Jobo–Superia | + 4' 51" |
| 10 | Yves Hézard (FRA) | Peugeot–Esso–Michelin | + 4' 52" |

General classification after stage 14

| Rank | Rider | Team | Time |
|---|---|---|---|
| 1 | Joseph Bruyère (BEL) | C&A | 66h 51' 24" |
| 2 | Joop Zoetemelk (NED) | Miko–Mercier–Hutchinson | + 1' 03" |
| 3 | Bernard Hinault (FRA) | Renault–Gitane–Campagnolo | + 1' 50" |
| 4 | Michel Pollentier (BEL) | Velda–Lono–Flandria | + 2' 38" |
| 5 | Joaquim Agostinho (POR) | Velda–Lono–Flandria | + 6' 20" |
| 6 | Hennie Kuiper (NED) | TI–Raleigh | + 7' 15" |
| 7 | Mariano Martínez (FRA) | Jobo–Superia | + 10' 42" |
| 8 | Freddy Maertens (BEL) | Velda–Lono–Flandria | + 11' 29" |
| 9 | Francisco Galdós (ESP) | Kas–Campagnolo | + 12' 01" |
| 10 | Paul Wellens (BEL) | TI–Raleigh | + 12' 31" |

== Stage 15 ==
15 July 1978 – Saint-Dier-d'Auvergne to Saint-Étienne, 196 km (122 mi)

Stage 15 result

| Rank | Rider | Team | Time |
|---|---|---|---|
| 1 | Bernard Hinault (FRA) | Renault–Gitane–Campagnolo | 5h 49' 48" |
| 2 | Sean Kelly (IRL) | Velda–Lono–Flandria | s.t. |
| 3 | Freddy Maertens (BEL) | Velda–Lono–Flandria | s.t. |
| 4 | Miguel María Lasa (ESP) | Teka | s.t. |
| 5 | Christian Seznec (FRA) | Miko–Mercier–Hutchinson | s.t. |
| 6 | Patrick Friou (FRA) | Lejeune–BP | s.t. |
| 7 | Régis Ovion (FRA) | Peugeot–Esso–Michelin | s.t. |
| 8 | Klaus-Peter Thaler (FRG) | TI–Raleigh | s.t. |
| 9 | Mariano Martínez (FRA) | Jobo–Superia | s.t. |
| 10 | René Bittinger (FRA) | Velda–Lono–Flandria | s.t. |

General classification after stage 15

| Rank | Rider | Team | Time |
|---|---|---|---|
| 1 | Joseph Bruyère (BEL) | C&A | 72h 41' 12" |
| 2 | Joop Zoetemelk (NED) | Miko–Mercier–Hutchinson | + 1' 03" |
| 3 | Bernard Hinault (FRA) | Renault–Gitane–Campagnolo | + 1' 50" |
| 4 | Michel Pollentier (BEL) | Velda–Lono–Flandria | + 2' 38" |
| 5 | Joaquim Agostinho (POR) | Velda–Lono–Flandria | + 6' 20" |
| 6 | Hennie Kuiper (NED) | TI–Raleigh | + 7' 15" |
| 7 | Mariano Martínez (FRA) | Jobo–Superia | + 10' 42" |
| 8 | Freddy Maertens (BEL) | Velda–Lono–Flandria | + 11' 29" |
| 9 | Francisco Galdós (ESP) | Kas–Campagnolo | + 12' 01" |
| 10 | Paul Wellens (BEL) | TI–Raleigh | + 12' 31" |

== Stage 16 ==
16 July 1978 – Saint-Étienne to Alpe d'Huez, 241 km (150 mi)

Stage 16 result

| Rank | Rider | Team | Time |
|---|---|---|---|
| 1 | Hennie Kuiper (NED) | TI–Raleigh | 7h 23' 45" |
| 2 | Bernard Hinault (FRA) | Renault–Gitane–Campagnolo | + 8" |
| 3 | Joop Zoetemelk (NED) | Miko–Mercier–Hutchinson | + 41" |
| 4 | Joaquim Agostinho (POR) | Velda–Lono–Flandria | + 1' 34" |
| 5 | Henk Lubberding (NED) | TI–Raleigh | + 2' 14" |
| 6 | Lucien Van Impe (BEL) | C&A | + 2' 23" |
| 7 | Francisco Galdós (ESP) | Kas–Campagnolo | s.t. |
| 8 | Sven-Åke Nilsson (SWE) | Miko–Mercier–Hutchinson | + 3' 25" |
| 9 | Paul Wellens (BEL) | TI–Raleigh | + 3' 43" |
| 10 | Raymond Martin (FRA) | Miko–Mercier–Hutchinson | + 4' 48" |

General classification after stage 16

| Rank | Rider | Team | Time |
|---|---|---|---|
| 1 | Joop Zoetemelk (NED) | Miko–Mercier–Hutchinson | 80h 06' 41" |
| 2 | Bernard Hinault (FRA) | Renault–Gitane–Campagnolo | + 14" |
| 3 | Hennie Kuiper (NED) | TI–Raleigh | + 5' 31" |
| 4 | Joaquim Agostinho (POR) | Velda–Lono–Flandria | + 6' 10" |
| 5 | Joseph Bruyère (BEL) | C&A | + 9' 32" |
| 6 | Francisco Galdós (ESP) | Kas–Campagnolo | + 12' 46" |
| 7 | Henk Lubberding (NED) | TI–Raleigh | + 14' 30" |
| 8 | Paul Wellens (BEL) | TI–Raleigh | s.t. |
| 9 | Mariano Martínez (FRA) | Jobo–Superia | + 14' 56" |
| 10 | Lucien Van Impe (BEL) | C&A | + 16' 17" |

== Rest day 2 ==
17 July 1978 – Alpe d'Huez

== Stage 17 ==
18 July 1978 – Grenoble to Morzine, 225 km (140 mi)

Stage 17 result

| Rank | Rider | Team | Time |
|---|---|---|---|
| 1 | Christian Seznec (FRA) | Miko–Mercier–Hutchinson | 7h 13' 34" |
| 2 | Paul Wellens (BEL) | TI–Raleigh | + 9' 26" |
| 3 | Bernard Hinault (FRA) | Renault–Gitane–Campagnolo | + 9' 29" |
| 4 | Joop Zoetemelk (NED) | Miko–Mercier–Hutchinson | s.t. |
| 5 | Henk Lubberding (NED) | TI–Raleigh | + 9' 32" |
| 6 | Sven-Åke Nilsson (SWE) | Miko–Mercier–Hutchinson | s.t. |
| 7 | Joaquim Agostinho (POR) | Velda–Lono–Flandria | s.t. |
| 8 | Joseph Bruyère (BEL) | C&A | + 10' 17" |
| 9 | Pierre Bazzo (FRA) | Lejeune–BP | s.t. |
| 10 | Francisco Galdós (ESP) | Kas–Campagnolo | s.t. |

General classification after stage 17

| Rank | Rider | Team | Time |
|---|---|---|---|
| 1 | Joop Zoetemelk (NED) | Miko–Mercier–Hutchinson | 87h 29' 44" |
| 2 | Bernard Hinault (FRA) | Renault–Gitane–Campagnolo | + 14" |
| 3 | Joaquim Agostinho (POR) | Velda–Lono–Flandria | + 6' 13" |
| 4 | Christian Seznec (FRA) | Miko–Mercier–Hutchinson | + 8' 25" |
| 5 | Joseph Bruyère (BEL) | C&A | + 10' 25" |
| 6 | Francisco Galdós (ESP) | Kas–Campagnolo | + 13' 28" |
| 7 | Paul Wellens (BEL) | TI–Raleigh | + 14' 32" |
| 8 | Henk Lubberding (NED) | TI–Raleigh | + 14' 33" |
| 9 | Sven-Åke Nilsson (SWE) | Miko–Mercier–Hutchinson | + 16' 46" |
| 10 | Lucien Van Impe (BEL) | C&A | + 17' 01" |

== Stage 18 ==
19 July 1978 – Morzine to Lausanne, 137 km (85 mi)

Stage 18 result

| Rank | Rider | Team | Time |
|---|---|---|---|
| 1 | Gerrie Knetemann (NED) | TI–Raleigh | 3h 36' 52" |
| 2 | Joseph Bruyère (BEL) | C&A | + 13" |
| 3 | Paul Wellens (BEL) | TI–Raleigh | + 14" |
| 4 | Joaquim Agostinho (POR) | Velda–Lono–Flandria | + 15" |
| 5 | Edward Janssens (BEL) | C&A | + 22" |
| 6 | Antonio Menéndez (ESP) | Teka | + 1' 10" |
| 7 | René Martens (BEL) | C&A | + 1' 37" |
| 8 | Lucien Van Impe (BEL) | C&A | + 2' 16" |
| 9 | Freddy Maertens (BEL) | Velda–Lono–Flandria | + 2' 19" |
| 10 | Miguel María Lasa (ESP) | Teka | + 2' 20" |

General classification after stage 18

| Rank | Rider | Team | Time |
|---|---|---|---|
| 1 | Joop Zoetemelk (NED) | Miko–Mercier–Hutchinson | 91h 08' 57" |
| 2 | Bernard Hinault (FRA) | Renault–Gitane–Campagnolo | + 14" |
| 3 | Joaquim Agostinho (POR) | Velda–Lono–Flandria | + 4' 07" |
| 4 | Joseph Bruyère (BEL) | C&A | + 8' 17" |
| 5 | Christian Seznec (FRA) | Miko–Mercier–Hutchinson | + 8' 25" |
| 6 | Paul Wellens (BEL) | TI–Raleigh | + 12' 05" |
| 7 | Francisco Galdós (ESP) | Kas–Campagnolo | + 13' 28" |
| 8 | Henk Lubberding (NED) | TI–Raleigh | + 14' 33" |
| 9 | Sven-Åke Nilsson (SWE) | Miko–Mercier–Hutchinson | + 16' 46" |
| 10 | Lucien Van Impe (BEL) | C&A | + 16' 56" |

== Stage 19 ==
20 July 1978 – Lausanne to Belfort, 182 km (113 mi)

Stage 19 result

| Rank | Rider | Team | Time |
|---|---|---|---|
| 1 | Marc Demeyer (BEL) | Velda–Lono–Flandria | 5h 05' 57" |
| 2 | Jan Raas (NED) | TI–Raleigh | s.t. |
| 3 | Miguel María Lasa (ESP) | Teka | s.t. |
| 4 | Barry Hoban (GBR) | Miko–Mercier–Hutchinson | s.t. |
| 5 | Jean-Louis Gauthier (FRA) | Lejeune–BP | s.t. |
| 6 | René Dillen (BEL) | C&A | s.t. |
| 7 | Willy Teirlinck (BEL) | Renault–Gitane–Campagnolo | s.t. |
| 8 | Jean-Luc Vandenbroucke (BEL) | Peugeot–Esso–Michelin | s.t. |
| 9 | Serge Beucherie (FRA) | Fiat–La France | s.t. |
| 10 | Pedro Vilardebó (ESP) | Teka | + 4" |

General classification after stage 19

| Rank | Rider | Team | Time |
|---|---|---|---|
| 1 | Joop Zoetemelk (NED) | Miko–Mercier–Hutchinson | 96h 15' 25" |
| 2 | Bernard Hinault (FRA) | Renault–Gitane–Campagnolo | + 14" |
| 3 | Joaquim Agostinho (POR) | Velda–Lono–Flandria | + 4' 07" |
| 4 | Joseph Bruyère (BEL) | C&A | + 8' 17" |
| 5 | Christian Seznec (FRA) | Miko–Mercier–Hutchinson | + 8' 25" |
| 6 | Paul Wellens (BEL) | TI–Raleigh | + 12' 05" |
| 7 | Francisco Galdós (ESP) | Kas–Campagnolo | + 13' 28" |
| 8 | Henk Lubberding (NED) | TI–Raleigh | + 14' 33" |
| 9 | Sven-Åke Nilsson (SWE) | Miko–Mercier–Hutchinson | + 16' 46" |
| 10 | Lucien Van Impe (BEL) | C&A | + 16' 56" |

== Stage 20 ==
21 July 1978 – Metz to Nancy, 72 km (45 mi) (ITT)

Stage 20 result

| Rank | Rider | Team | Time |
|---|---|---|---|
| 1 | Bernard Hinault (FRA) | Renault–Gitane–Campagnolo | 1h 39' 29" |
| 2 | Joseph Bruyère (BEL) | C&A | + 1' 01" |
| 3 | Gerrie Knetemann (NED) | TI–Raleigh | + 1' 58" |
| 4 | Paul Wellens (BEL) | TI–Raleigh | + 2' 47" |
| 5 | Joaquim Agostinho (POR) | Velda–Lono–Flandria | + 3' 01" |
| 6 | Marc Demeyer (BEL) | Velda–Lono–Flandria | + 3' 36" |
| 7 | Jean-Luc Vandenbroucke (BEL) | Peugeot–Esso–Michelin | + 3' 46" |
| 8 | Francisco Galdós (ESP) | Kas–Campagnolo | + 3' 54" |
| 9 | Joop Zoetemelk (NED) | Miko–Mercier–Hutchinson | + 4' 10" |
| 10 | Wilfried Wesemael (BEL) | TI–Raleigh | + 4' 14" |

General classification after stage 20

| Rank | Rider | Team | Time |
|---|---|---|---|
| 1 | Bernard Hinault (FRA) | Renault–Gitane–Campagnolo | 97h 55' 08" |
| 2 | Joop Zoetemelk (NED) | Miko–Mercier–Hutchinson | + 3' 56" |
| 3 | Joaquim Agostinho (POR) | Velda–Lono–Flandria | + 6' 54" |
| 4 | Joseph Bruyère (BEL) | C&A | + 9' 04" |
| 5 | Christian Seznec (FRA) | Miko–Mercier–Hutchinson | + 12' 50" |
| 6 | Paul Wellens (BEL) | TI–Raleigh | + 14' 38" |
| 7 | Francisco Galdós (ESP) | Kas–Campagnolo | + 17' 08" |
| 8 | Henk Lubberding (NED) | TI–Raleigh | + 18' 48" |
| 9 | Lucien Van Impe (BEL) | C&A | + 21' 01" |
| 10 | Mariano Martínez (FRA) | Jobo–Superia | + 22' 58" |

== Stage 21 ==
22 July 1978 – Épernay to Senlis, 207 km (129 mi)

Stage 21 result

| Rank | Rider | Team | Time |
|---|---|---|---|
| 1 | Jan Raas (NED) | TI–Raleigh | 5h 58' 49" |
| 2 | Freddy Maertens (BEL) | Velda–Lono–Flandria | + 14" |
| 3 | Yvon Bertin (FRA) | Renault–Gitane–Campagnolo | s.t. |
| 4 | Jacques Esclassan (FRA) | Peugeot–Esso–Michelin | s.t. |
| 5 | Barry Hoban (GBR) | Miko–Mercier–Hutchinson | s.t. |
| 6 | Régis Delépine (FRA) | Peugeot–Esso–Michelin | s.t. |
| 7 | Marc Demeyer (BEL) | Velda–Lono–Flandria | s.t. |
| 8 | Wilfried Wesemael (BEL) | TI–Raleigh | s.t. |
| 9 | Alain Patritti (FRA) | Jobo–Superia | s.t. |
| 10 | Klaus-Peter Thaler (FRG) | TI–Raleigh | s.t. |

General classification after stage 21

| Rank | Rider | Team | Time |
|---|---|---|---|
| 1 | Bernard Hinault (FRA) | Renault–Gitane–Campagnolo | 103h 54' 11" |
| 2 | Joop Zoetemelk (NED) | Miko–Mercier–Hutchinson | + 3' 56" |
| 3 | Joaquim Agostinho (POR) | Velda–Lono–Flandria | + 6' 54" |
| 4 | Joseph Bruyère (BEL) | C&A | + 9' 04" |
| 5 | Christian Seznec (FRA) | Miko–Mercier–Hutchinson | + 12' 50" |
| 6 | Paul Wellens (BEL) | TI–Raleigh | + 14' 38" |
| 7 | Francisco Galdós (ESP) | Kas–Campagnolo | + 17' 08" |
| 8 | Henk Lubberding (NED) | TI–Raleigh | + 18' 48" |
| 9 | Lucien Van Impe (BEL) | C&A | + 21' 01" |
| 10 | Mariano Martínez (FRA) | Jobo–Superia | + 22' 58" |

== Stage 22 ==
23 July 1978 – Saint Germain en Laye to Paris Champs-Élysées, 162 km (101 mi)

Stage 22 result

| Rank | Rider | Team | Time |
|---|---|---|---|
| 1 | Gerrie Knetemann (NED) | TI–Raleigh | 4h 22' 46" |
| 2 | René Martens (BEL) | C&A | + 1" |
| 3 | Henk Lubberding (NED) | TI–Raleigh | s.t. |
| 4 | Fedor den Hertog (NED) | Lejeune–BP | + 2" |
| 5 | Yvon Bertin (FRA) | Renault–Gitane–Campagnolo | + 1' 03" |
| 6 | Jacques Esclassan (FRA) | Peugeot–Esso–Michelin | s.t. |
| 7 | Aad van den Hoek (NED) | TI–Raleigh | s.t. |
| 8 | Yves Hézard (FRA) | Peugeot–Esso–Michelin | s.t. |
| 9 | José De Cauwer (BEL) | TI–Raleigh | s.t. |
| 10 | Dominique Sanders (FRA) | Fiat–La France | s.t. |

General classification after stage 22

| Rank | Rider | Team | Time |
|---|---|---|---|
| 1 | Bernard Hinault (FRA) | Renault–Gitane–Campagnolo | 108h 18' 00" |
| 2 | Joop Zoetemelk (NED) | Miko–Mercier–Hutchinson | + 3' 56" |
| 3 | Joaquim Agostinho (POR) | Velda–Lono–Flandria | + 6' 54" |
| 4 | Joseph Bruyère (BEL) | C&A | + 9' 04" |
| 5 | Christian Seznec (FRA) | Miko–Mercier–Hutchinson | + 12' 50" |
| 6 | Paul Wellens (BEL) | TI–Raleigh | + 14' 38" |
| 7 | Francisco Galdós (ESP) | Kas–Campagnolo | + 17' 08" |
| 8 | Henk Lubberding (NED) | TI–Raleigh | + 17' 26" |
| 9 | Lucien Van Impe (BEL) | C&A | + 21' 01" |
| 10 | Mariano Martínez (FRA) | Jobo–Superia | + 22' 58" |
