= 1978 Tour de France =

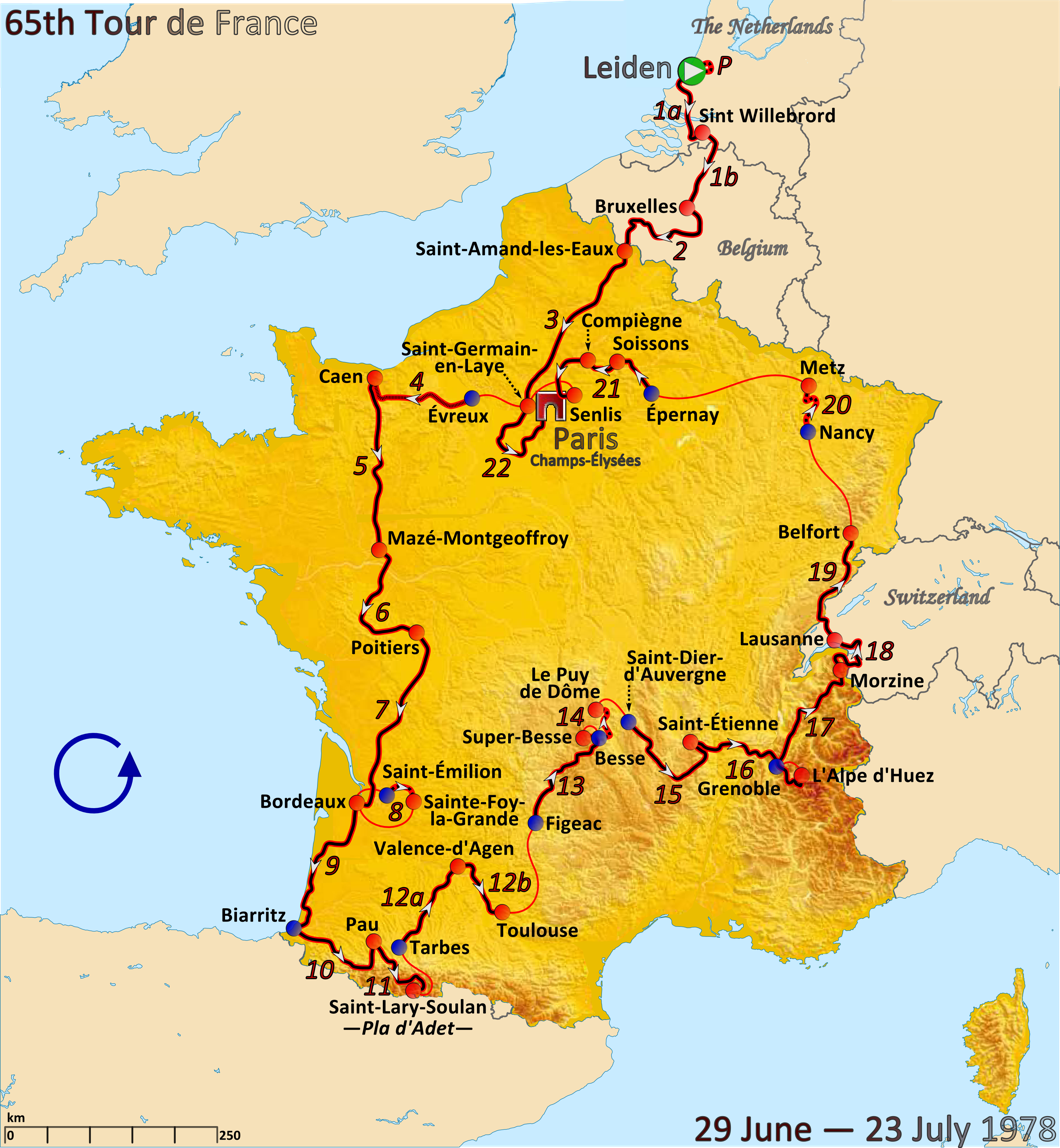
- Route of the 1978 Tour de France

Race details
- Dates: 29 June – 23 July 1978
- Stages: 22 + Prologue, including two split stages
- Distance: 3,908 km (2,428 mi)
- Winning time: 108h 18' 00"

Results
Jersey awarded to the overall winner	Winner	Bernard Hinault (FRA)	(Renault–Gitane–Campagnolo)
	Second	Joop Zoetemelk (NED)	(Miko–Mercier–Vivagel)
	Third	Joaquim Agostinho (POR)	(Flandria–Velda–Lano)
Jersey awarded to the points classification winner	Points	Freddy Maertens (BEL)	(Flandria–Velda–Lano)
Jersey awarded to the mountains classification winner	Mountains	Mariano Martínez (FRA)	(Jobo–Spidel–La Roue d'Or)
Jersey awarded to the young rider classification winner	Young rider	Henk Lubberding (NED)	(TI–Raleigh–McGregor)
	Sprints	Jacques Bossis (FRA)	(Renault–Gitane–Campagnolo)
	Combativity	Paul Wellens (BEL)	(TI–Raleigh–McGregor)
	Team	Miko–Mercier–Vivagel	
	Team points	TI–Raleigh–McGregor	

The 1978 Tour de France was the 65th edition of the Tour de France, one of cycling's Grand Tours. It took place between 29 June and 23 July, with 22 stages covering a distance of 3,908 km (2,428 mi).

The 1978 Tour had a high-profile doping case when Michel Pollentier was caught in an attempt to cheat the doping test, after he had won the 16th stage to Alpe d'Huez, and had taken the lead in the general classification. Pollentier left the race, and the overall victory became a battle between Joop Zoetemelk and Bernard Hinault. In the end, it was won by debutant Bernard Hinault, for the first of his five victories. The points classification was won by Freddy Maertens, and the mountains classification by Mariano Martínez.

== Teams ==
The 1978 Tour started with 11 teams, each sent 10 cyclists, a total of 110.

The teams entering the race were:

- C&A
- Fiat
- Flandria–Velda–Lano
- Jobo–Spidel–La Roue d'Or
- Kas–Campagnolo
- Lejeune–BP
- Miko–Mercier–Vivagel
- Peugeot–Esso–Michelin
- Renault–Gitane–Campagnolo
- Teka
- TI–Raleigh–McGregor

== Pre-race favourites ==
Since the 1977 Tour de France, dominant riders as Eddy Merckx, Felice Gimondi, Raymond Poulidor and Luis Ocaña had retired. Lucien Van Impe, the winner of 1976, had broken his collarbone and was still recovering.

The main contenders were debutant Hinault, who had won the 1978 Vuelta a España, and Joop Zoetemelk, who had already finished in second place for three times. Pre-race analysis judged Hinault better in the time trials, and Zoetemelk better in the mountains. Bernard Thévenet, the winner of the 1977 Tour de France, was out of form, and not considered a favourite.

== Route and stages ==
The 1978 Tour de France started on 29 June, and had two rest days, in Biarritz and Alpe d'Huez. The highest point of elevation in the race was 2,115 m (6,939 ft) at the summit of the Col du Tourmalet mountain pass on stage 11.

The twenty-first stage from Épernay to Senlis was split in three parts: 78.5 km from Épernay to Soissons, directly followed by 59 km from Soissons to Compiègne, directly followed by 70.5 km from Compiègne to Senlis; the sprints in Soissons and Compiègne counted as flying stages, which were won by Freddy Maertens and Wilfried Wesemael. Although they technically had the same status as all other stages, these flying stages are not shown in most overviews.

Stage characteristics and winners
Stage	Date	Course	Distance	Type	Winner
P	29 June	Leiden (Netherlands)	5 km (3.1 mi)	Individual time trial	Jan Raas (NED)
1a	30 June	Leiden to Sint Willebrord (Netherlands)	135 km (84 mi)	Plain stage	Jan Raas (NED)
1b	30 June	Sint Willebrord (Netherlands) to Brussels (Belgium)	100 km (62 mi)	Plain stage	Walter Planckaert (BEL)
2	1 July	Brussels (Belgium) to Saint-Amand-les-Eaux	199 km (124 mi)	Plain stage	Jacques Esclassan (FRA)
3	2 July	Saint-Amand-les-Eaux to Saint-Germain-en-Laye	244 km (152 mi)	Plain stage	Klaus-Peter Thaler (FRG)
4	3 July	Évreux to Caen	153 km (95 mi)	Team time trial	(Netherlands) TI–Raleigh–McGregor
5	4 July	Caen to Mazé–Montgeoffroy	244 km (152 mi)	Plain stage	Freddy Maertens (BEL)
6	5 July	Mazé–Montgeoffroy to Poitiers	162 km (101 mi)	Plain stage	Sean Kelly (IRE)
7	6 July	Poitiers to Bordeaux	242 km (150 mi)	Plain stage	Freddy Maertens (BEL)
8	7 July	Saint-Émilion to Sainte-Foy-la-Grande	59 km (37 mi)	Individual time trial	Bernard Hinault (FRA)
9	8 July	Bordeaux to Biarritz	233 km (145 mi)	Plain stage	Miguel María Lasa (ESP)
	9 July	Biarritz		Rest day	
10	10 July	Biarritz to Pau	192 km (119 mi)	Hilly stage	Henk Lubberding (NED)
11	11 July	Pau to Saint-Lary-Soulan Pla d'Adet	161 km (100 mi)	Stage with mountain(s)	Mariano Martínez (FRA)
12a	12 July	Tarbes to Valence d'Agen	158 km (98 mi)	Plain stage	Cancelled
12b	12 July	Valence d'Agen to Toulouse	96 km (60 mi)	Plain stage	Jacques Esclassan (FRA)
13	13 July	Figeac to Super Besse	221 km (137 mi)	Hilly stage	Paul Wellens (BEL)
14	14 July	Besse-en-Chandesse to Puy-de-Dôme	52 km (32 mi)	Individual time trial	Joop Zoetemelk (NED)
15	15 July	Saint-Dier-d'Auvergne to Saint-Étienne	196 km (122 mi)	Hilly stage	Bernard Hinault (FRA)
16	16 July	St-Étienne to Alpe d'Huez	241 km (150 mi)	Stage with mountain(s)	Hennie Kuiper (NED)
	17 July	Alpe d'Huez		Rest day	
17	18 July	Grenoble to Morzine	225 km (140 mi)	Stage with mountain(s)	Christian Seznec (FRA)
18	19 July	Morzine to Lausanne (Switzerland)	137 km (85 mi)	Plain stage	Gerrie Knetemann (NED)
19	20 July	Lausanne (Switzerland) to Belfort	182 km (113 mi)	Plain stage	Marc Demeyer (BEL)
20	21 July	Metz to Nancy	72 km (45 mi)	Individual time trial	Bernard Hinault (FRA)
21	22 July	Épernay to Senlis	207 km (129 mi)	Plain stage	Jan Raas (NED)
22	23 July	Saint Germain en Laye to Paris (Champs-Élysées)	162 km (101 mi)	Plain stage	Gerrie Knetemann (NED)
	Total		3,908 km (2,428 mi)		

== Race overview ==
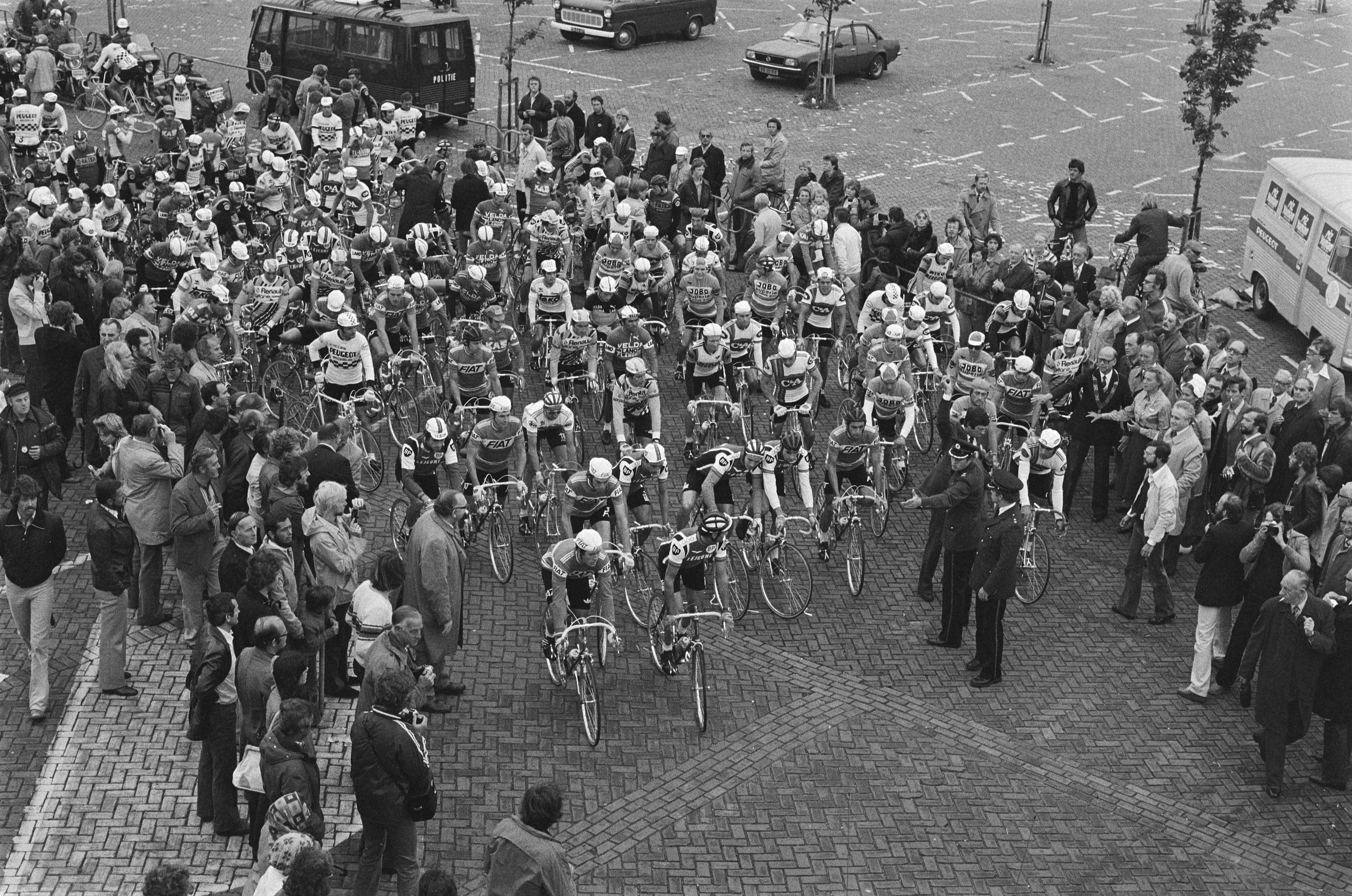
The start of stage 1b in Sint Willebrord, Netherlands

During the prologue, held in the Netherlands, the weather was bad. The four top places were taken by Dutch cyclists, with Jan Raas the winner. The team directors then had a meeting, and all but the manager of Raas' team voted to request the Tour directors to not count the results from the prologue for the overall classification. The directors agreed, so the prologue results did not count. Jan Raas was still given the stage win, but he was not recognized as race leader, so he was not allowed to wear the yellow jersey during the first stage. The winner of the previous year, Bernard Thévenet, was allowed to wear the yellow jersey, but he refused. In that first stage, Raas and his team were full of anger. Raas escaped close to the finish, and beat everybody by a second, thus becoming the race's leader after all.

Raas lost the lead in the third stage. The fourth stage was run as a time trial. The TI–Raleigh team was specialized in this, and they won the stage. Klaus-Peter Thaler of the TI–Raleigh team became the new leader, thanks to the bonification seconds. Hinault beat Zoetemelk in the time trial in stage eight. Joseph Bruyère, former second man of Eddy Merckx, finished in second place and became the new race leader.

The eleventh stage included the toughest mountains in the Pyrenées. On the last mountain, the Pla d'Adet, Pollentier and Zoetemelk attacked, and Martinez and Hinault soon followed. Martinez rode away to win the stage, and Hinault won some seconds on Zoetemelk. Bruyère stayed the leader, with Hinault in second place and Zoetemelk in third place. During that stage, Thevenet retired. The next day, the twelfth stage was scheduled, split into two sections. This meant that after the transfer from the previous stage, the riders were not in bed before 12:00 am, and had to wake up at 5:00 am. In the early stage to Valence-d'Agen, the riders held a strike against the early start. They rode at a slow pace of 20 kilometres per hour (12 mph), arrived at the finish well behind schedule, and crossed the finish line walking. The Tour officials canceled the stage. The fourteenth stage was an individual mountain time trial. Zoetemelk won the stage, beating Bruyère by 55 seconds and Hinault by 100 seconds. Hinault had lost some time because his lightweight bike, that he intended to use for the steepest part, broke when he hit a spectator while changing bikes.

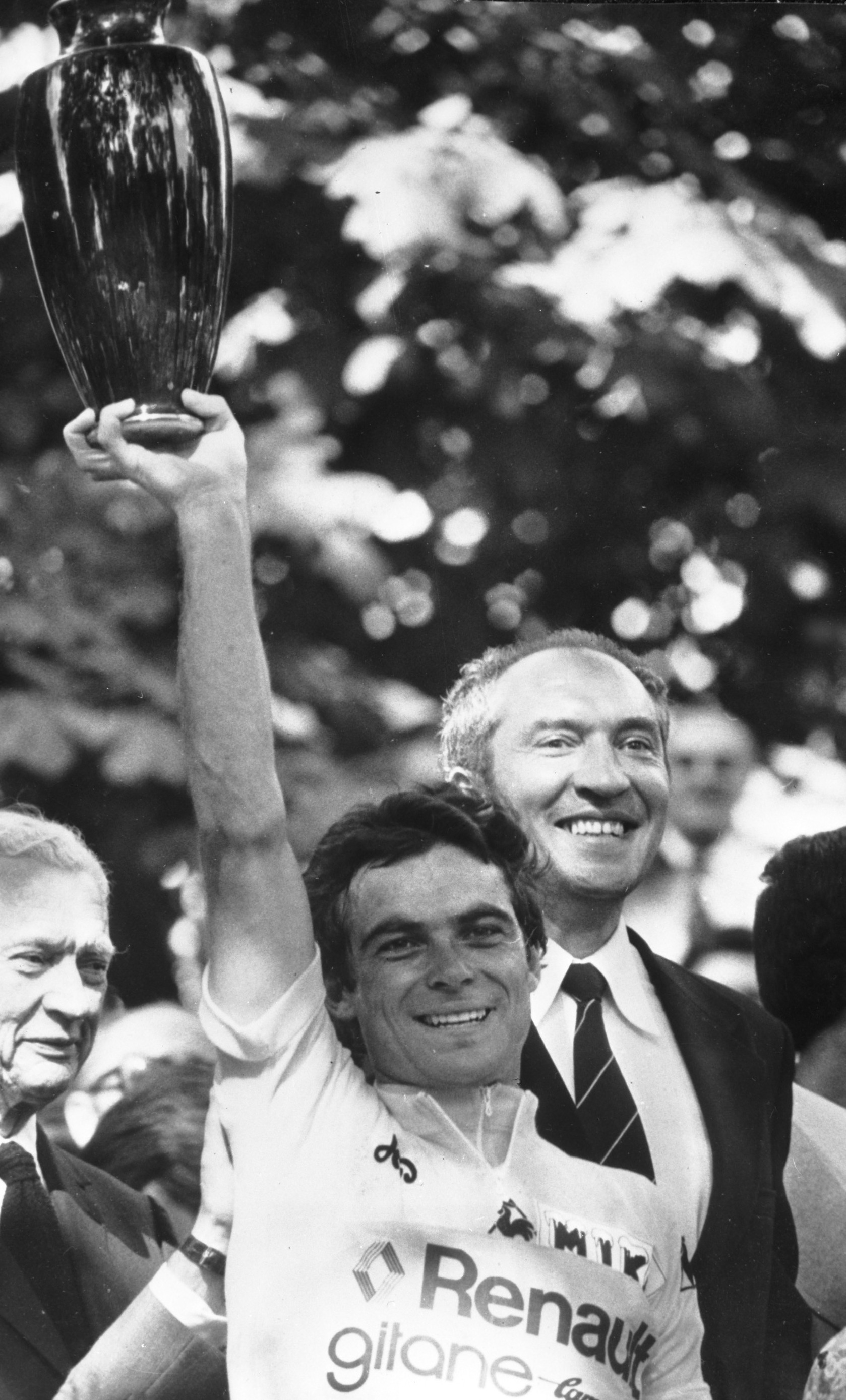
Bernard Hinault celebrating winning the general classification at the end of the Tour

In the sixteenth stage, that ended on top of Alpe d'Huez, Pollentier attacked. At the foot of the Alpe d'Huez, Pollentier had a margin of two minutes. He was chased by Hinault, Zoetemelk and Kuiper, who at 4 km before the finish had closed the gap to 50 seconds. Hinault then attacked, and Kuiper could follow but Zoetemelk had to let them go. Pollentier stayed away, won the stage and became the new leader of the general classification. As stage winner and general classification leader, Pollentier had to go to the doping control. Pollentier first went to his hotel, and was only found two hours later. Another cyclist at the doping control, Antoine Guttierrez, was found with a fake urine sample, trying to use it to fake the doping control. This device did not work, and the race doctor discovered the fraud. He then checked the other cyclists, and Pollentier was using the same fraud. Pollentier was removed from the race, and Zoetemelk became the new leader. Pollentier later explained that he tried to evade the controls because he had taken amphetamines for breathing, and he did not know if it would give back a positive test.

In the seventeenth stage, Kuiper, third in the general classification, crashed, broke a clavicle, and had to leave the race. Hinault was only 14 seconds behind Zoetemelk at the start of the time trial in stage 20. Hinault won that time trial by more than four minutes over Zoetemelk, and became the race leader.

=== Doping ===
In total, 110 doping tests were done. Three cyclists were penalised for doping offences, all tested after the sixteenth stage; Antoine Guttierrez, for attempt of fraud; Michel Pollentier, for attempt of fraud; and José Nazabal. Nazabal had already anticipated the positive result, and had left the race before the eighteenth stage. Guttierrez and Pollentier were removed from the race and banned for two months; Nazabal was set back to the last place of the stage, received ten minutes penalty time in the general classification, a fine of 1000 Swiss Francs and one month provisional suspension.

== Classification leadership and minor prizes ==
There were several classifications in the 1978 Tour de France, four of them awarding jerseys to their leaders. The most important was the general classification, calculated by adding each cyclist's finishing times on each stage. The cyclist with the least accumulated time was the race leader, identified by the yellow jersey; the winner of this classification is considered the winner of the Tour. Some rules were changed after the 1977 Tour de France, mainly concerning the time bonuses. In previous years, intermediate sprints were not associated with time bonuses, but in 1978, the winner of such a sprint got 20 seconds bonification time, if he was part of an escape (defined as a group with less than 20% of the total cyclists, with a margin of 20 seconds of more on the next group). The penalty system was also changed. In previous years, cyclists who broke the rules on minor points (being pushed, taking drinks on places where it was not allowed) were penalised with points in the points classification. From 1978 on, time penalties were also given for the general classification.

Additionally, there was a points classification, where cyclists got points for finishing among the best in a stage finish, or in intermediate sprints. The cyclist with the most points lead the classification, and was identified with a green jersey.

There was also a mountains classification. The organisation had categorised some climbs as either first, second, third, or fourth-category; points for this classification were won by the first cyclists that reached the top of these climbs first, with more points available for the higher-categorised climbs. The cyclist with the most points lead the classification, and wore a white jersey with red polka dots.

Another classification was the young rider classification. This was decided the same way as the general classification, but restricted to riders who were born after 1 July 1978, and were in their first or second year as professional cyclist. There were 34 riders that qualified for the classification on the start list. The leader wore a white jersey.

The fifth individual classification was the intermediate sprints classification. This classification had similar rules as the points classification, but only points were awarded on intermediate sprints. In 1978, this classification had no associated jersey.

The team classification in 1977 was calculated with the times of the three best cyclists per team, but was in 1978 changed to the best five cyclists. The riders in the team that led this classification were identified by yellow caps. There was also a team points classification. Cyclists received points according to their finishing position on each stage, with the first rider receiving one point. The first three finishers of each team had their points combined, and the team with the fewest points led the classification. The riders of the team leading this classification wore green caps. The Kas team finished with only two cyclists, so was not eligible for the team classifications. The Souvenir Henri Desgrange was given in honour of Tour founder Henri Desgrange to the first rider to pass a point on stage 11 in the valley village of Sainte-Marie de Campan climb. This prize was won by Christian Seznec.

In addition, there was a combativity award, in which a jury composed of journalists gave points after certain stages to the cyclist they considered most combative. The split stages each had a combined winner. At the conclusion of the Tour, Paul Wellens won the overall super-combativity award, also decided by journalists.

Classification leadership by stage
Stage	Stage winner	General classification	Points classification	Mountains classification	Young rider classification	Intermediate sprints classification	Team classifications	
Stage	Stage winner	General classification	Points classification	Mountains classification	Young rider classification	Intermediate sprints classification	By time	By points
P	Jan Raas	cancelled	no award	no award	no award	no award	cancelled	cancelled
1a	Jan Raas	Jan Raas	Jan Raas	no award	Jean-Louis Gauthier	Freddy Maertens	TI–Raleigh–McGregor	TI–Raleigh–McGregor
1b	Walter Planckaert	Jan Raas	Freddy Maertens	no award	Jean-Louis Gauthier	Freddy Maertens	TI–Raleigh–McGregor	TI–Raleigh–McGregor
2	Jacques Esclassan	Jan Raas	Freddy Maertens	Roger Legeay	Sean Kelly	Freddy Maertens	TI–Raleigh–McGregor	TI–Raleigh–McGregor
3	Klaus-Peter Thaler	Jacques Bossis	Freddy Maertens	Roger Legeay	René Bittinger	Jacques Bossis	TI–Raleigh–McGregor	TI–Raleigh–McGregor
4	TI–Raleigh–McGregor	Klaus-Peter Thaler	Freddy Maertens	Roger Legeay	René Bittinger	Jacques Bossis	TI–Raleigh–McGregor	TI–Raleigh–McGregor
5	Freddy Maertens	Klaus-Peter Thaler	Freddy Maertens	Roger Legeay	René Bittinger	Jacques Bossis	TI–Raleigh–McGregor	Renault–Gitane–Campagnolo
6	Sean Kelly	Gerrie Knetemann	Freddy Maertens	Roger Legeay	René Bittinger	Jacques Bossis	TI–Raleigh–McGregor	Peugeot–Esso–Michelin
7	Freddy Maertens	Gerrie Knetemann	Freddy Maertens	Roger Legeay	René Bittinger	Jacques Bossis	TI–Raleigh–McGregor	Peugeot–Esso–Michelin
8	Bernard Hinault	Joseph Bruyère	Freddy Maertens	Roger Legeay	Henk Lubberding	Jacques Bossis	TI–Raleigh–McGregor	Peugeot–Esso–Michelin
9	Miguel María Lasa	Joseph Bruyère	Freddy Maertens	Roger Legeay	Henk Lubberding	Jacques Bossis	TI–Raleigh–McGregor	Peugeot–Esso–Michelin
10	Henk Lubberding	Joseph Bruyère	Freddy Maertens	Gilbert Lelay	Henk Lubberding	Jacques Bossis	TI–Raleigh–McGregor	Peugeot–Esso–Michelin
11	Mariano Martínez	Joseph Bruyère	Freddy Maertens	Michel Pollentier	Henk Lubberding	Jacques Bossis	TI–Raleigh–McGregor	Renault–Gitane–Campagnolo
12a	cancelled	Joseph Bruyère	Freddy Maertens	Michel Pollentier	Henk Lubberding	Jacques Bossis	TI–Raleigh–McGregor	Renault–Gitane–Campagnolo
12b	Jacques Esclassan	Joseph Bruyère	Freddy Maertens	Michel Pollentier	Henk Lubberding	Jacques Bossis	TI–Raleigh–McGregor	Peugeot–Esso–Michelin
13	Paul Wellens	Joseph Bruyère	Freddy Maertens	Michel Pollentier	Henk Lubberding	Jacques Bossis	C&A	TI–Raleigh–McGregor
14	Joop Zoetemelk	Joseph Bruyère	Freddy Maertens	Michel Pollentier	Henk Lubberding	Jacques Bossis	C&A	TI–Raleigh–McGregor
15	Bernard Hinault	Joseph Bruyère	Freddy Maertens	Michel Pollentier	Henk Lubberding	Jacques Bossis	Miko–Mercier–Vivagel	TI–Raleigh–McGregor
16	Hennie Kuiper	Joop Zoetemelk	Freddy Maertens	Mariano Martínez	Henk Lubberding	Jacques Bossis	Miko–Mercier–Vivagel	TI–Raleigh–McGregor
17	Christian Seznec	Joop Zoetemelk	Freddy Maertens	Bernard Hinault	Henk Lubberding	Jacques Bossis	Miko–Mercier–Vivagel	TI–Raleigh–McGregor
18	Gerrie Knetemann	Joop Zoetemelk	Freddy Maertens	Mariano Martínez	Henk Lubberding	Jacques Bossis	Miko–Mercier–Vivagel	TI–Raleigh–McGregor
19	Marc Demeyer	Joop Zoetemelk	Freddy Maertens	Mariano Martínez	Henk Lubberding	Jacques Bossis	Miko–Mercier–Vivagel	TI–Raleigh–McGregor
20	Bernard Hinault	Bernard Hinault	Freddy Maertens	Mariano Martínez	Henk Lubberding	Jacques Bossis	Miko–Mercier–Vivagel	TI–Raleigh–McGregor
21	Jan Raas	Bernard Hinault	Freddy Maertens	Mariano Martínez	Henk Lubberding	Jacques Bossis	Miko–Mercier–Vivagel	TI–Raleigh–McGregor
22	Gerrie Knetemann	Bernard Hinault	Freddy Maertens	Mariano Martínez	Henk Lubberding	Jacques Bossis	Miko–Mercier–Vivagel	TI–Raleigh–McGregor
Final		Bernard Hinault	Freddy Maertens	Mariano Martínez	Henk Lubberding	Jacques Bossis	Miko–Mercier–Vivagel	TI–Raleigh–McGregor

== Final standings ==
Legend
A yellow jersey.	Denotes the winner of the general classification	A green jersey.	Denotes the winner of the points classification
A white jersey with red polka dots.	Denotes the winner of the mountains classification	A white jersey.	Denotes the winner of the young rider classification

=== General classification ===
Final general classification (1–10)
Rank	Rider	Team	Time
1	Bernard Hinault (FRA)	Renault–Gitane–Campagnolo	108h 18' 00"
2	Joop Zoetemelk (NED)	Miko–Mercier–Vivagel	+ 3' 56"
3	Joaquim Agostinho (POR)	Flandria–Velda–Lano	+ 6' 54"
4	Joseph Bruyère (BEL)	C&A	+ 9' 04"
5	Christian Seznec (FRA)	Miko–Mercier–Vivagel	+ 12' 50"
6	Paul Wellens (BEL)	TI–Raleigh–McGregor	+ 14' 38"
7	Francisco Galdós (ESP)	Kas–Campagnolo	+ 17' 08"
8	Henk Lubberding (NED)	TI–Raleigh–McGregor	+ 17' 26"
9	Lucien Van Impe (BEL)	C&A	+ 21' 01"
10	Mariano Martínez (FRA)	Jobo–Spidel–La Roue d'Or	+ 22' 58"

Final general classification (11–78)
Rank	Rider	Team	Time
11	Sven-Åke Nilsson (SWE)	Miko–Mercier–Vivagel	+ 23' 00"
12	Raymond Martin (FRA)	Miko–Mercier–Vivagel	+ 32' 58"
13	Freddy Maertens (BEL)	Flandria–Velda–Lano	+ 34' 26"
14	Michel Laurent (FRA)	Peugeot–Esso–Michelin	+ 40' 00"
15	André Romero (FRA)	Jobo–Spidel–La Roue d'Or	+ 49' 34"
16	Edouard Janssens (BEL)	C&A	+ 51' 19"
17	Yves Hézard (FRA)	Peugeot–Esso–Michelin	+ 53' 20"
18	Antonio Menéndez (ESP)	Teka	+ 53' 28"
19	René Bittinger (FRA)	Flandria–Velda–Lano	+ 53' 47"
20	Jos Deschoenmaecker (BEL)	C&A	+ 54' 14"
21	Pierre Bazzo (FRA)	Lejeune–BP	+ 55' 35"
22	José Martins (POR)	Teka	+ 57' 07"
23	Gilbert Le Lay (FRA)	Fiat	+ 57' 40"
24	Jan Raas (NED)	TI–Raleigh–McGregor	+ 58' 43"
25	Fedor den Hertog (NED)	Lejeune–BP	+ 1h 01' 46"
26	René Martens (BEL)	C&A	+ 1h 02' 29"
27	Maurice Le Guilloux (FRA)	Miko–Mercier–Vivagel	+ 1h 02' 40"
28	Bernard Bourreau (FRA)	Peugeot–Esso–Michelin	+ 1h 06' 34"
29	Patrick Perret (FRA)	Miko–Mercier–Vivagel	+ 1h 06' 34"
30	Ferdinand Julien (FRA)	Jobo–Spidel–La Roue d'Or	+ 1h 06' 45"
31	Pierre-Raymond Villemiane (FRA)	Renault–Gitane–Campagnolo	+ 1h 07' 50"
32	Juan Pujol (ESP)	Kas–Campagnolo	+ 1h 08' 20"
33	Charles Rouxel (FRA)	Miko–Mercier–Vivagel	+ 1h 09' 19"
34	Sean Kelly (IRE)	Flandria–Velda–Lano	+ 1h 10' 18"
35	Klaus-Peter Thaler (FRG)	TI–Raleigh–McGregor	+ 1h 10' 22"
36	André Mollet (FRA)	Miko–Mercier–Vivagel	+ 1h 13' 38"
37	Gilbert Chaumaz (FRA)	Renault–Gitane–Campagnolo	+ 1h 15' 50"
38	Willy Teirlinck (BEL)	Renault–Gitane–Campagnolo	+ 1h 16' 30"
39	Andrés Oliva (ESP)	Teka	+ 1h 20' 06"
40	Pedro Vilardebó (ESP)	Teka	+ 1h 21' 27"
41	Miguel María Lasa (ESP)	Teka	+ 1h 21' 37"
42	Roger Legeay (FRA)	Lejeune–BP	+ 1h 29' 39"
43	Gerrie Knetemann (NED)	TI–Raleigh–McGregor	+ 1h 30' 10"
44	Herman Beysens (BEL)	Flandria–Velda–Lano	+ 1h 31' 58"
45	Hubert Mathis (FRA)	Miko–Mercier–Vivagel	+ 1h 34' 40"
46	Bernardo Alfonsel (ESP)	Teka	+ 1h 35' 51"
47	Wilfried Wesemael (BEL)	TI–Raleigh–McGregor	+ 1h 36' 16"
48	Alain De Carvalho (FRA)	Fiat	+ 1h 39' 48"
49	Marc Demeyer (BEL)	Flandria–Velda–Lano	+ 1h 40' 50"
50	Dominique Sanders (FRA)	Fiat	+ 1h 41' 26"
51	René Dillen (BEL)	C&A	+ 1h 41' 31"
52	Lucien Didier (LUX)	Renault–Gitane–Campagnolo	+ 1h 44' 44"
53	Christian Muselet (FRA)	Flandria–Velda–Lano	+ 1h 48' 10"
54	Alain Patritti (FRA)	Jobo–Spidel–La Roue d'Or	+ 1h 50' 07"
55	José De Cauwer (BEL)	TI–Raleigh–McGregor	+ 1h 50' 12"
56	Albert Van Vlierberghe (BEL)	Flandria–Velda–Lano	+ 1h 52' 03"
57	Aad van den Hoek (NED)	TI–Raleigh–McGregor	+ 1h 53' 13"
58	Bernard Quilfen (FRA)	Renault–Gitane–Campagnolo	+ 1h 53' 46"
59	Marcel Tinazzi (FRA)	Flandria–Velda–Lano	+ 1h 53' 46"
60	Marcel Laurens (BEL)	C&A	+ 1h 56' 53"
61	Jacques Esclassan (FRA)	Peugeot–Esso–Michelin	+ 2h 00' 25"
62	Jacques Bossis (FRA)	Renault–Gitane–Campagnolo	+ 2h 02' 36"
63	André Chalmel (FRA)	Renault–Gitane–Campagnolo	+ 2h 03' 23"
64	Jean-Luc Vandenbroucke (BEL)	Peugeot–Esso–Michelin	+ 2h 04' 07"
65	Barry Hoban (GBR)	Miko–Mercier–Vivagel	+ 2h 06' 33"
66	Eugène Plet (FRA)	Lejeune–BP	+ 2h 10' 16"
67	Serge Beucherie (FRA)	Fiat	+ 2h 16' 40"
68	Philippe Durel (FRA)	Jobo–Spidel–La Roue d'Or	+ 2h 17' 13"
69	Jean-Louis Gauthier (FRA)	Lejeune–BP	+ 2h 17' 16"
70	Paul Sherwen (GBR)	Fiat	+ 2h 18' 54"
71	Alain Budet (FRA)	Fiat	+ 2h 20' 13"
72	Dino Bertolo (FRA)	Jobo–Spidel–La Roue d'Or	+ 2h 25' 50"
73	Jean-Jacques Fussien (FRA)	Fiat	+ 2h 27' 02"
74	Yvon Bertin (FRA)	Renault–Gitane–Campagnolo	+ 2h 36' 31"
75	Daniel Gisiger (SUI)	Lejeune–BP	+ 2h 49' 16"
76	Régis Delépine (FRA)	Peugeot–Esso–Michelin	+ 3h 02' 41"
77	Dante Coccolo (FRA)	Jobo–Spidel–La Roue d'Or	+ 3h 24' 18"
78	Philippe Tesnière (FRA)	Fiat	+ 3h 52' 26"

=== Points classification ===
Final points classification (1–10)
Rank	Rider	Team	Points
1	Freddy Maertens (BEL)	Flandria–Velda–Lano	242
2	Jacques Esclassan (FRA)	Peugeot–Esso–Michelin	185
3	Bernard Hinault (FRA)	Renault–Gitane–Campagnolo	123
4	Jan Raas (NED)	TI–Raleigh–McGregor	109
5	Joseph Bruyère (BEL)	C&A	100
6	Klaus-Peter Thaler (FRG)	TI–Raleigh–McGregor	91
7	Yvon Bertin (FRA)	Renault–Gitane–Campagnolo	79
8	Jacques Bossis (FRA)	Renault–Gitane–Campagnolo	74
9	Joop Zoetemelk (NED)	Miko–Mercier–Vivagel	71
10	Joaquim Agostinho (POR)	Teka	70

=== Mountains classification ===
Final mountains classification (1–10)
Rank	Rider	Team	Points
1	Mariano Martínez (FRA)	Jobo–Spidel–La Roue d'Or	187
2	Bernard Hinault (FRA)	Renault–Gitane–Campagnolo	176
3	Joop Zoetemelk (NED)	Miko–Mercier–Vivagel	155
4	Christian Seznec (FRA)	Miko–Mercier–Vivagel	90
5	Joaquim Agostinho (POR)	Flandria–Velda–Lano	73
6	Sven-Åke Nilsson (SWE)	Miko–Mercier–Vivagel	70
7	Paul Wellens (BEL)	TI–Raleigh–McGregor	68
8	René Bittinger (FRA)	Flandria–Velda–Lano	63
9	Gilbert Le Lay (FRA)	Fiat	54
10	Lucien Van Impe (BEL)	C&A	53

=== Young rider classification ===
Final young rider classification (1–10)
Rank	Rider	Team	Time
1	Henk Lubberding (NED)	TI–Raleigh–McGregor	108h 35' 26"
2	Sven-Åke Nilsson (SWE)	Miko–Mercier–Vivagel	+ 05' 34"
3	René Bittinger (FRA)	Flandria–Velda–Lano	+ 36' 21"
4	Pierre Bazzo (FRA)	Lejeune–BP	+ 38' 09"
5	Gilbert Le Lay (FRA)	Fiat	+ 40' 14"
6	René Martens (BEL)	C&A	+ 45' 03"
7	Pierre-Raymond Villemiane (FRA)	Renault–Gitane–Campagnolo	+ 50' 24"
8	Juan Pujol (ESP)	Kas–Campagnolo	+ 50' 54"
9	Sean Kelly (IRE)	Flandria–Velda–Lano	+ 52' 52"
10	Gilbert Chaumaz (FRA)	Renault–Gitane–Campagnolo	+ 58' 24"

=== Intermediate sprints classification ===
Final intermediate sprints classification (1–10)
Rank	Rider	Team	Points
1	Jacques Bossis (FRA)	Renault–Gitane–Campagnolo	95
2	Philippe Tesnière (FRA)	Fiat	60
3	Pierre-Raymond Villemiane (FRA)	Renault–Gitane–Campagnolo	52
4	Freddy Maertens (BEL)	Flandria–Velda–Lano	44
5	Marcel Laurens (BEL)	C&A	21
6	Jean-Jacques Fussien (FRA)	Fiat	18
7	Bernard Hinault (FRA)	Renault–Gitane–Campagnolo	18
8	Jacques Esclassan (FRA)	Peugeot–Esso–Michelin	16
9	Yvon Bertin (FRA)	Renault–Gitane–Campagnolo	15
10	Sean Kelly (IRE)	Flandria–Velda–Lano	14

=== Team classification ===
Final team classification (1–10)
Rank	Team	Time
1	Miko–Mercier–Vivagel	562h 05' 52"
2	TI–Raleigh–McGregor	+ 17' 20"
3	C&A	+ 17' 22"
4	Flandria–Velda–Lano	+ 1h 15' 45"
5	Renault–Gitane–Campagnolo	+ 1h 47' 46"
6	Peugeot–Esso–Michelin	+ 4h 25' 36"
7	Lejeune–BP	+ 4h 29' 18"
8	Teka	+ 4h 51' 32"
9	Jobo–Spidel–La Roue d'Or	+ 5h 02' 48"
10	Fiat	+ 7h 04' 37"

=== Team points classification ===
Final team points classification (1–10)
Rank	Team	Time
1	TI–Raleigh–McGregor	720
2	Renault–Gitane–Campagnolo	909
3	Flandria–Velda–Lano	972
4	Miko–Mercier–Vivagel	1072
5	Peugeot–Esso–Michelin	1144
6	C&A	1456
7	Jobo–Spidel–La Roue d'Or	1656
8	Lejeune–BP	1729
9	Fiat	2347
10	Teka	2629

== Super Prestige Pernod ranking ==
The top twelve places of the general classification awarded points that contributed towards the Super Prestige Pernod ranking, an international season-long road cycling competition, with the winner seen as the best all-round rider. The 110 points accrued by Bernard Hinault moved him to the top, replacing Francesco Moser, who did not ride the Tour.

Super Prestige Pernod ranking on 23 July 1978 (1–6)
Rank	Rider	Team	Points
1	Bernard Hinault (FRA)	Renault–Gitane–Campagnolo	210
2	Francesco Moser (ITA)	Sanson–Campagnolo	178
3	Joop Zoetemelk (NED)	Miko–Mercier–Vivagel	136
4	Roger De Vlaeminck (BEL)	Sanson–Campagnolo	104
5	Michel Pollentier (BEL)	Flandria–Velda–Lano	104
6	Joseph Bruyère (BEL)	C&A	103

== See also ==
- 1978 Giro d'Italia
- 1978 Vuelta a España
- 1978 in sports
- Doping at the Tour de France
- List of doping cases in cycling

== Bibliography ==
- Augendre, Jacques (2016). "Guide historique" [Historical guide] (PDF). Tour de France (in French). Paris: Amaury Sport Organisation. Archived (PDF) from the original on 17 August 2016.
- Duker, Peter (1978). Tour de France 1978. Keighley, UK: Kennedy Brothers Publishing. OCLC 67121801.
- Magowan, Robin (1979). Tour de France: The 75th anniversary cycle race. London: Stanley Paul. ISBN 978-0-09-138730-3.
- McGann, Bill; McGann, Carol (2008). The Story of the Tour de France: 1965–2007. Vol. 2. Indianapolis: Dog Ear Publishing. ISBN 978-1-59858-608-4.
- Nauright, John; Parrish, Charles (2012). Sports Around the World: History, Culture, and Practice. Vol. 2. Santa Barbara, California: ABC-CLIO. ISBN 978-1-59884-300-2.
- Thompson, Christopher S. (2008). The Tour de France: A Cultural History. Oakland, California: University of California Press. ISBN 978-0-520-25630-9.
- van den Akker, Pieter (2018). Tour de France Rules and Statistics: 1903–2018. Self-published. ISBN 978-1-79398-080-9.
