= 1980 Tour de France, Prologue to Stage 10 =

Cycling race stages

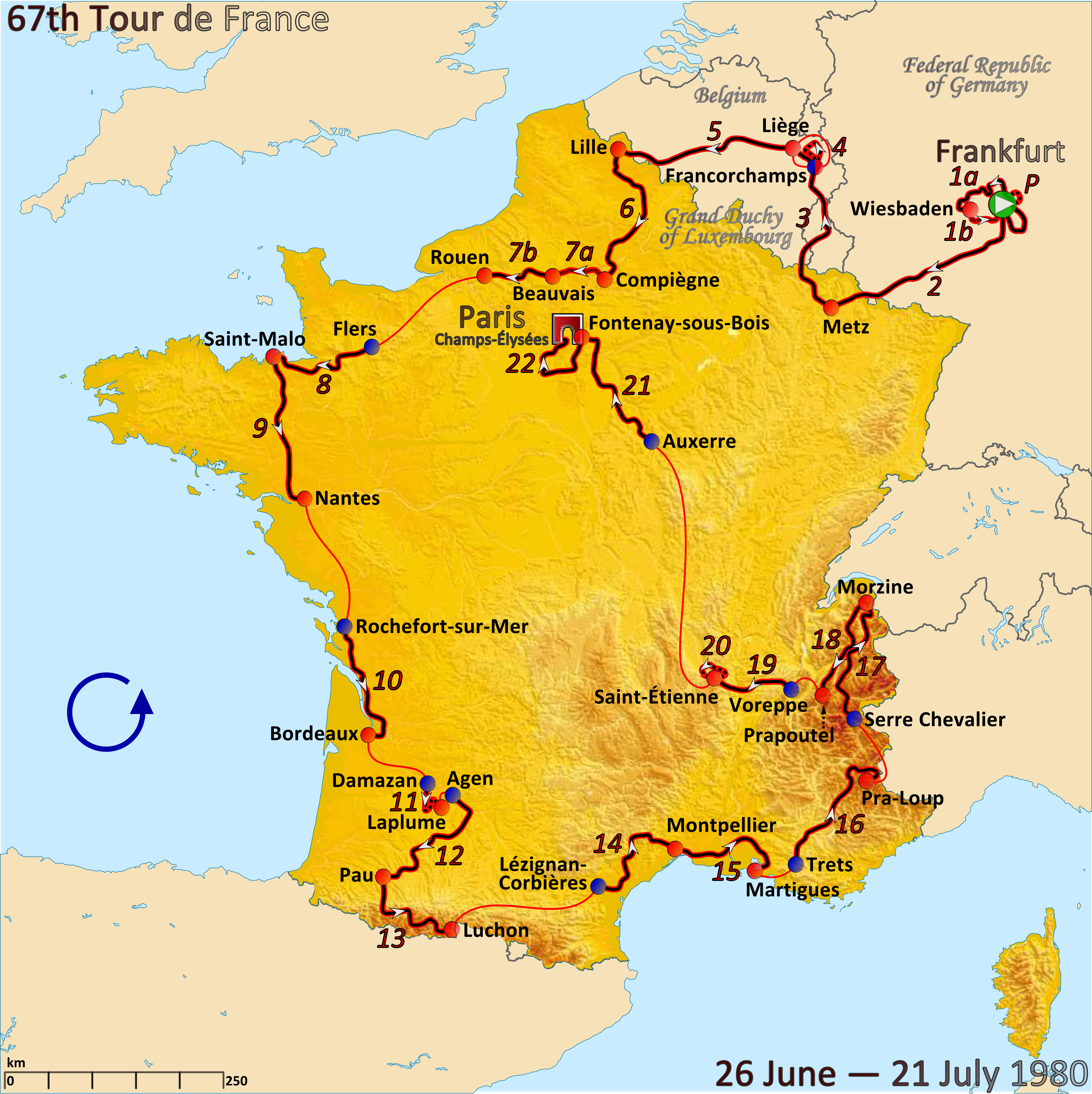
Route of the 1980 Tour de France

The 1980 Tour de France was the 67th edition of Tour de France, one of cycling's Grand Tours. The Tour began in Frankfurt with a prologue individual time trial on 26 June and Stage 10 occurred on 7 July with a flat stage to Bordeaux. The race finished on the Champs-Élysées in Paris on 20 July.

== Prologue ==
26 June 1980 — Frankfurt to Frankfurt, 7.6 km (4.7 mi) (ITT)

Prologue result and general classification after prologue

Rank	Rider	Team	Time
1	Bernard Hinault (FRA)	Renault–Gitane–Campagnolo	9' 13"
2	Gerrie Knetemann (NED)	TI–Raleigh–Creda	+ 5"
3	Bert Oosterbosch (NED)	TI–Raleigh–Creda	+ 17"
4	Ludo Peeters (BEL)	IJsboerke–Warncke Eis–Koga Miyata	+ 21"
5	Dietrich Thurau (FRG)	Puch–Sem–Campagnolo	+ 22"
6	Hennie Kuiper (NED)	Peugeot–Esso–Michelin	+ 23"
7	Henk Lubberding (NED)	TI–Raleigh–Creda	+ 24"
8	Jean-René Bernaudeau (FRA)	Renault–Gitane–Campagnolo	s.t.
9	Gilbert Duclos-Lassalle (FRA)	Peugeot–Esso–Michelin	+ 25"
10	Jan Raas (NED)	TI–Raleigh–Creda	s.t.

== Stage 1a ==
27 June 1980 — Frankfurt to Wiesbaden, 132.5 km (82.3 mi)

Stage 1a result

Rank	Rider	Team	Time
1	Jan Raas (NED)	TI–Raleigh–Creda	3h 19' 39"
2	William Tackaert (BEL)	Daf Trucks–Lejeune–PZ	s.t.
3	Sean Kelly (IRL)	Splendor–Admiral–TV Ekspres	s.t.
4	Dietrich Thurau (FRG)	Puch–Sem–Campagnolo	s.t.
5	Jos Jacobs (BEL)	IJsboerke–Warncke Eis–Koga Miyata	s.t.
6	Joël Gallopin (FRA)	Miko–Mercier–Vivagel	s.t.
7	Patrick Bonnet (FRA)	Renault–Gitane–Campagnolo	s.t.
8	Paul Sherwen (GBR)	La Redoute–Motobécane	s.t.
9	Cees Priem (NED)	TI–Raleigh–Creda	s.t.
10	Yvon Bertin (FRA)	Renault–Gitane–Campagnolo	s.t.

General classification after stage 1a

Rank	Rider	Team	Time
1	Bernard Hinault (FRA)	Renault–Gitane–Campagnolo	3h 28' 52"
2	Gerrie Knetemann (NED)	TI–Raleigh–Creda	+ 5"
3	Bert Oosterbosch (NED)	TI–Raleigh–Creda	+ 17"
4	Ludo Peeters (BEL)	IJsboerke–Warncke Eis–Koga Miyata	+ 21"
5	Dietrich Thurau (FRG)	Puch–Sem–Campagnolo	+ 22"
6	Hennie Kuiper (NED)	Peugeot–Esso–Michelin	+ 23"
7	Henk Lubberding (NED)	TI–Raleigh–Creda	+ 24"
8	Jean-René Bernaudeau (FRA)	Renault–Gitane–Campagnolo	s.t.
9	Gilbert Duclos-Lassalle (FRA)	Peugeot–Esso–Michelin	+ 25"
10	Jan Raas (NED)	TI–Raleigh–Creda	s.t.

== Stage 1b ==
27 June 1980 — Wiesbaden to Frankfurt, 45.8 km (28.5 mi) (TTT)

Stage 1b result

Rank	Team	Time
1	TI–Raleigh–Creda	53' 45"
2	Renault–Gitane–Campagnolo	+ 44"
3	Peugeot–Esso–Michelin	+ 1' 09"
4	IJsboerke–Warncke Eis–Koga Miyata	+ 1' 17"
5	Daf Trucks–Lejeune–PZ	+ 2' 03"
6	Miko–Mercier–Vivagel	+ 2' 12"
7	La Redoute–Motobécane	+ 2' 14"
8	Puch–Sem–Campagnolo	+ 2' 47"
9	Splendor–Admiral–TV Ekspres	+ 2' 54"
10	Marc–IWC–VRD	+ 3' 07"

General classification after stage 1b

Rank	Rider	Team	Time
1	Gerrie Knetemann (NED)	TI–Raleigh–Creda	3h 26' 42"
2	Jan Raas (NED)	TI–Raleigh–Creda	+ 20"
3	Bernard Hinault (FRA)	Renault–Gitane–Campagnolo	s.t.
4	Joop Zoetemelk (NED)	TI–Raleigh–Creda	+ 22"
5	Johan van der Velde (NED)	TI–Raleigh–Creda	+ 28"
6	Cees Priem (NED)	TI–Raleigh–Creda	+ 37"
7	Jean-René Bernaudeau (FRA)	Renault–Gitane–Campagnolo	+ 44"
8	Pierre-Raymond Villemiane (FRA)	Renault–Gitane–Campagnolo	+ 52"
9	Patrick Bonnet (FRA)	Renault–Gitane–Campagnolo	+ 57"
10	Maurice Le Guilloux (FRA)	Renault–Gitane–Campagnolo	+ 59"

== Stage 2 ==
28 June 1980 — Frankfurt to Metz, 276 km (171.5 mi)

Stage 2 result

Rank	Rider	Team	Time
1	Rudy Pevenage (BEL)	IJsboerke–Warncke Eis–Koga Miyata	7h 36' 18"
2	Pierre Bazzo (FRA)	La Redoute–Motobécane	s.t.
3	Yvon Bertin (FRA)	Renault–Gitane–Campagnolo	s.t.
4	Jan Raas (NED)	TI–Raleigh–Creda	+ 9' 53"
5	Leo van Vliet (NED)	TI–Raleigh–Creda	s.t.
6	Sean Kelly (IRL)	Splendor–Admiral–TV Ekspres	s.t.
7	Benjamin Vermeulen (BEL)	Boston–Mavic–Amis du Tour	s.t.
8	Ludo Peeters (BEL)	IJsboerke–Warncke Eis–Koga Miyata	s.t.
9	Jacques Osmont (FRA)	Boston–Mavic–Amis du Tour	s.t.
10	Dirk Heirweg (BEL)	Daf Trucks–Lejeune–PZ	s.t.

General classification after stage 2

Rank	Rider	Team	Time
1	Yvon Bertin (FRA)	Renault–Gitane–Campagnolo	11h 03' 05"
2	Rudy Pevenage (BEL)	IJsboerke–Warncke Eis–Koga Miyata	+ 1' 14"
3	Pierre Bazzo (FRA)	La Redoute–Motobécane	+ 1' 32"
4	Gerrie Knetemann (NED)	TI–Raleigh–Creda	+ 9' 48"
5	Jan Raas (NED)	TI–Raleigh–Creda	+ 10' 08"
6	Bernard Hinault (FRA)	Renault–Gitane–Campagnolo	s.t.
7	Joop Zoetemelk (NED)	TI–Raleigh–Creda	+ 10' 10"
8	Johan van der Velde (NED)	TI–Raleigh–Creda	+ 10' 16"
9	Cees Priem (NED)	TI–Raleigh–Creda	+ 10' 25"
10	Jean-René Bernaudeau (FRA)	Renault–Gitane–Campagnolo	+ 10' 32"

== Stage 3 ==
29 June 1980 — Metz to Liège, 258 km (160 mi)

Stage 3 result

Rank	Rider	Team	Time
1	Henk Lubberding (NED)	TI–Raleigh–Creda	7h 58' 37"
2	Ronny Claes (BEL)	IJsboerke–Warncke Eis–Koga Miyata	+ 1' 31"
3	Guido Van Calster (BEL)	Splendor–Admiral–TV Ekspres	s.t.
4	Jean-Luc Vandenbroucke (BEL)	La Redoute–Motobécane	s.t.
5	Eddy Schepers (BEL)	Daf Trucks–Lejeune–PZ	s.t.
6	Jos Jacobs (BEL)	IJsboerke–Warncke Eis–Koga Miyata	+ 3' 07"
7	Sean Kelly (IRL)	Splendor–Admiral–TV Ekspres	s.t.
8	Bernard Hinault (FRA)	Renault–Gitane–Campagnolo	s.t.
9	Patrick Pevenage (BEL)	Daf Trucks–Lejeune–PZ	s.t.
10	Johan van der Velde (NED)	TI–Raleigh–Creda	s.t.

General classification after stage 3

Rank	Rider	Team	Time
1	Rudy Pevenage (BEL)	IJsboerke–Warncke Eis–Koga Miyata	19h 06' 03"
2	Pierre Bazzo (FRA)	La Redoute–Motobécane	+ 18"
3	Henk Lubberding (NED)	TI–Raleigh–Creda	+ 8' 01"
4	Ronny Claes (BEL)	IJsboerke–Warncke Eis–Koga Miyata	+ 8' 18"
5	Gerrie Knetemann (NED)	TI–Raleigh–Creda	+ 8' 34"
6	Bernard Hinault (FRA)	Renault–Gitane–Campagnolo	+ 8' 42"
7	Jean-Luc Vandenbroucke (BEL)	La Redoute–Motobécane	+ 8' 50"
8	Joop Zoetemelk (NED)	TI–Raleigh–Creda	+ 8' 56"
9	Eddy Schepers (BEL)	Daf Trucks–Lejeune–PZ	+ 8' 58"
10	Johan van der Velde (NED)	TI–Raleigh–Creda	+ 9' 02"

== Stage 4 ==
30 June 1980 — Circuit de Spa, 33.4 km (20.8 mi) (ITT)

Stage 4 result

Rank	Rider	Team	Time
1	Bernard Hinault (FRA)	Renault–Gitane–Campagnolo	47' 28"
2	Joop Zoetemelk (NED)	TI–Raleigh–Creda	+ 1' 16"
3	Gerrie Knetemann (NED)	TI–Raleigh–Creda	+ 1' 25"
4	Johan van der Velde (NED)	TI–Raleigh–Creda	+ 1' 47"
5	Johan De Muynck (BEL)	Splendor–Admiral–TV Ekspres	+ 1' 51"
6	Michel Pollentier (BEL)	Splendor–Admiral–TV Ekspres	+ 1' 54"
7	Jean-Luc Vandenbroucke (BEL)	La Redoute–Motobécane	+ 1' 59"
8	Paul Wellens (BEL)	TI–Raleigh–Creda	+ 2' 03"
9	Ronny Claes (BEL)	IJsboerke–Warncke Eis–Koga Miyata	s.t.
10	Henk Lubberding (NED)	TI–Raleigh–Creda	+ 2' 06"

General classification after stage 4

Rank	Rider	Team	Time
1	Rudy Pevenage (BEL)	IJsboerke–Warncke Eis–Koga Miyata	19h 56' 32"
2	Pierre Bazzo (FRA)	La Redoute–Motobécane	+ 1' 04"
3	Bernard Hinault (FRA)	Renault–Gitane–Campagnolo	+ 5' 41"
4	Gerrie Knetemann (NED)	TI–Raleigh–Creda	+ 6' 58"
5	Henk Lubberding (NED)	TI–Raleigh–Creda	+ 7' 06"
6	Joop Zoetemelk (NED)	TI–Raleigh–Creda	+ 7' 11"
7	Ronny Claes (BEL)	IJsboerke–Warncke Eis–Koga Miyata	+ 7' 20"
8	Johan van der Velde (NED)	TI–Raleigh–Creda	+ 7' 48"
9	Jean-Luc Vandenbroucke (BEL)	La Redoute–Motobécane	s.t.
10	Jean-René Bernaudeau (FRA)	Renault–Gitane–Campagnolo	+ 8' 57"

== Stage 5 ==
1 July 1980 — Liège to Lille, 236.5 km (147.0 mi)

Stage 5 result

Rank	Rider	Team	Time
1	Bernard Hinault (FRA)	Renault–Gitane–Campagnolo	8h 03' 22"
2	Hennie Kuiper (NED)	Peugeot–Esso–Michelin	s.t.
3	Ludo Delcroix (BEL)	IJsboerke–Warncke Eis–Koga Miyata	+ 58"
4	Yvon Bertin (FRA)	Renault–Gitane–Campagnolo	s.t.
5	Guido Van Calster (BEL)	Splendor–Admiral–TV Ekspres	s.t.
6	Sean Kelly (IRL)	Splendor–Admiral–TV Ekspres	s.t.
7	Pierre Bazzo (FRA)	La Redoute–Motobécane	s.t.
8	Jean-Luc Vandenbroucke (BEL)	La Redoute–Motobécane	s.t.
9	Jean-Louis Gauthier (FRA)	Miko–Mercier–Vivagel	s.t.
10	Jean-René Bernaudeau (FRA)	Renault–Gitane–Campagnolo	s.t.

General classification after stage 5

Rank	Rider	Team	Time
1	Rudy Pevenage (BEL)	IJsboerke–Warncke Eis–Koga Miyata	28h 02' 05"
2	Pierre Bazzo (FRA)	La Redoute–Motobécane	+ 1' 04"
3	Bernard Hinault (FRA)	Renault–Gitane–Campagnolo	+ 3' 28"
4	Hennie Kuiper (NED)	Peugeot–Esso–Michelin	+ 6' 47"
5	Henk Lubberding (NED)	TI–Raleigh–Creda	+ 7' 06"
6	Joop Zoetemelk (NED)	TI–Raleigh–Creda	+ 7' 11"
7	Ronny Claes (BEL)	IJsboerke–Warncke Eis–Koga Miyata	+ 7' 20"
8	Johan van der Velde (NED)	TI–Raleigh–Creda	+ 7' 48"
9	Jean-Luc Vandenbroucke (BEL)	La Redoute–Motobécane	s.t.
10	Jean-René Bernaudeau (FRA)	Renault–Gitane–Campagnolo	+ 8' 57"

== Stage 6 ==
2 July 1980 — Lille to Compiègne, 219.5 km (136.4 mi)

Stage 6 result

Rank	Rider	Team	Time
1	Jean-Louis Gauthier (FRA)	Miko–Mercier–Vivagel	5h 57' 11"
2	Gery Verlinden (BEL)	IJsboerke–Warncke Eis–Koga Miyata	+ 1"
3	Bernard Bourreau (FRA)	Peugeot–Esso–Michelin	s.t.
4	Gerrie Knetemann (NED)	TI–Raleigh–Creda	s.t.
5	Patrick Bonnet (FRA)	Renault–Gitane–Campagnolo	s.t.
6	Sean Kelly (IRL)	Splendor–Admiral–TV Ekspres	+ 39"
7	Yvon Bertin (FRA)	Renault–Gitane–Campagnolo	s.t.
8	Jacques Osmont (FRA)	Boston–Mavic–Amis du Tour	s.t.
9	Johan van der Velde (NED)	TI–Raleigh–Creda	s.t.
10	Frank Hoste (BEL)	Marc–IWC–VRD	s.t.

General classification after stage 6

Rank	Rider	Team	Time
1	Rudy Pevenage (BEL)	IJsboerke–Warncke Eis–Koga Miyata	33h 59' 57"
2	Pierre Bazzo (FRA)	La Redoute–Motobécane	+ 1' 04"
3	Bernard Hinault (FRA)	Renault–Gitane–Campagnolo	+ 3' 28"
4	Hennie Kuiper (NED)	Peugeot–Esso–Michelin	+ 6' 47"
5	Henk Lubberding (NED)	TI–Raleigh–Creda	+ 7' 06"
6	Joop Zoetemelk (NED)	TI–Raleigh–Creda	+ 7' 11"
7	Ronny Claes (BEL)	IJsboerke–Warncke Eis–Koga Miyata	+ 7' 20"
8	Johan van der Velde (NED)	TI–Raleigh–Creda	+ 7' 48"
9	Jean-Luc Vandenbroucke (BEL)	La Redoute–Motobécane	s.t.
10	Patrick Bonnet (FRA)	Renault–Gitane–Campagnolo	+ 8' 48"

== Stage 7a ==
3 July 1980 — Compiègne to Beauvais, 65 km (40 mi) (TTT)

Stage 7a result

Rank	Team	Time
1	TI–Raleigh–Creda	1h 24' 09"
2	Peugeot–Esso–Michelin	+ 37"
3	IJsboerke–Warncke Eis–Koga Miyata	+ 43"
4	Renault–Gitane–Campagnolo	+ 51"
5	Puch–Sem–Campagnolo	+ 1' 29"
6	Daf Trucks–Lejeune–PZ	+ 2' 09"
7	Miko–Mercier–Vivagel	+ 2' 18"
8	Splendor–Admiral–TV Ekspres	+ 2' 48"
9	La Redoute–Motobécane	+ 4' 22"
10	Marc–IWC–VRD	+ 5' 47"

General classification after stage 7a

Rank	Rider	Team	Time
1	Rudy Pevenage (BEL)	IJsboerke–Warncke Eis–Koga Miyata	33h 57' 57"
2	Pierre Bazzo (FRA)	La Redoute–Motobécane	+ 2' 24"
3	Bernard Hinault (FRA)	Renault–Gitane–Campagnolo	+ 3' 48"
4	Henk Lubberding (NED)	TI–Raleigh–Creda	+ 5' 51"
5	Joop Zoetemelk (NED)	TI–Raleigh–Creda	+ 5' 56"
6	Hennie Kuiper (NED)	Peugeot–Esso–Michelin	+ 6' 12"
7	Johan van der Velde (NED)	TI–Raleigh–Creda	+ 6' 33"
8	Ronny Claes (BEL)	IJsboerke–Warncke Eis–Koga Miyata	+ 7' 20"
9	Patrick Bonnet (FRA)	Renault–Gitane–Campagnolo	+ 9' 08"
10	Jean-Luc Vandenbroucke (BEL)	La Redoute–Motobécane	s.t.

== Stage 7b ==
3 July 1980 — Beauvais to Rouen, 92 km (57 mi)

Stage 7b result

Rank	Rider	Team	Time
1	Jan Raas (NED)	TI–Raleigh–Creda	2h 15' 33"
2	Leo van Vliet (NED)	TI–Raleigh–Creda	s.t.
3	Jacques Osmont (FRA)	Boston–Mavic–Amis du Tour	s.t.
4	Jos Jacobs (BEL)	IJsboerke–Warncke Eis–Koga Miyata	s.t.
5	Eddy Schepers (BEL)	Daf Trucks–Lejeune–PZ	s.t.
6	Klaus-Peter Thaler (FRG)	Teka	s.t.
7	Frank Hoste (BEL)	Marc–IWC–VRD	s.t.
8	Guido Van Calster (BEL)	Splendor–Admiral–TV Ekspres	s.t.
9	Rudy Pevenage (BEL)	IJsboerke–Warncke Eis–Koga Miyata	s.t.
10	Herman Beysens (BEL)	Splendor–Admiral–TV Ekspres	s.t.

General classification after stage 7b

Rank	Rider	Team	Time
1	Rudy Pevenage (BEL)	IJsboerke–Warncke Eis–Koga Miyata	36h 13' 30"
2	Pierre Bazzo (FRA)	La Redoute–Motobécane	+ 2' 24"
3	Bernard Hinault (FRA)	Renault–Gitane–Campagnolo	+ 3' 48"
4	Joop Zoetemelk (NED)	TI–Raleigh–Creda	+ 5' 48"
5	Henk Lubberding (NED)	TI–Raleigh–Creda	+ 5' 51"
6	Hennie Kuiper (NED)	Peugeot–Esso–Michelin	+ 6' 12"
7	Johan van der Velde (NED)	TI–Raleigh–Creda	+ 6' 33"
8	Ronny Claes (BEL)	IJsboerke–Warncke Eis–Koga Miyata	+ 7' 20"
9	Patrick Bonnet (FRA)	Renault–Gitane–Campagnolo	+ 9' 08"
10	Jean-Luc Vandenbroucke (BEL)	La Redoute–Motobécane	s.t.

== Stage 8 ==
4 July 1980 — Flers to Saint-Malo, 164 km (102 mi)

Stage 8 result

Rank	Rider	Team	Time
1	Bert Oosterbosch (NED)	TI–Raleigh–Creda	4h 21' 04"
2	Sean Kelly (IRL)	Splendor–Admiral–TV Ekspres	+ 13"
3	William Tackaert (BEL)	Daf Trucks–Lejeune–PZ	s.t.
4	Jan Raas (NED)	TI–Raleigh–Creda	s.t.
5	Guido Van Calster (BEL)	Splendor–Admiral–TV Ekspres	s.t.
6	Klaus-Peter Thaler (FRG)	Teka	s.t.
7	Yvon Bertin (FRA)	Renault–Gitane–Campagnolo	s.t.
8	Benjamin Vermeulen (BEL)	Boston–Mavic–Amis du Tour	s.t.
9	Jos Jacobs (BEL)	IJsboerke–Warncke Eis–Koga Miyata	s.t.
10	Jacques Osmont (FRA)	Boston–Mavic–Amis du Tour	s.t.

General classification after stage 8

Rank	Rider	Team	Time
1	Rudy Pevenage (BEL)	IJsboerke–Warncke Eis–Koga Miyata	40h 34' 39"
2	Pierre Bazzo (FRA)	La Redoute–Motobécane	+ 2' 20"
3	Bernard Hinault (FRA)	Renault–Gitane–Campagnolo	+ 3' 56"
4	Joop Zoetemelk (NED)	TI–Raleigh–Creda	+ 5' 56"
5	Henk Lubberding (NED)	TI–Raleigh–Creda	+ 5' 59"
6	Hennie Kuiper (NED)	Peugeot–Esso–Michelin	+ 6' 20"
7	Johan van der Velde (NED)	TI–Raleigh–Creda	+ 6' 41"
8	Ronny Claes (BEL)	IJsboerke–Warncke Eis–Koga Miyata	+ 7' 24"
9	Patrick Bonnet (FRA)	Renault–Gitane–Campagnolo	+ 9' 16"
10	Jean-Luc Vandenbroucke (BEL)	La Redoute–Motobécane	s.t.

== Stage 9 ==
6 July 1980 — Saint-Malo to Nantes, 203.5 km (126.4 mi)

Stage 9 result

Rank	Rider	Team	Time
1	Jan Raas (NED)	TI–Raleigh–Creda	5h 28' 27"
2	William Tackaert (BEL)	Daf Trucks–Lejeune–PZ	s.t.
3	Jos Jacobs (BEL)	IJsboerke–Warncke Eis–Koga Miyata	s.t.
4	Guido Van Calster (BEL)	Splendor–Admiral–TV Ekspres	s.t.
5	Patrick Friou (FRA)	Miko–Mercier–Vivagel	s.t.
6	Jan Jonkers (NED)	Boston–Mavic–Amis du Tour	s.t.
7	Rudy Pevenage (BEL)	IJsboerke–Warncke Eis–Koga Miyata	s.t.
8	Johan van der Velde (NED)	TI–Raleigh–Creda	s.t.
9	Jacques Bossis (FRA)	Peugeot–Esso–Michelin	s.t.
10	Klaus-Peter Thaler (FRG)	Teka	s.t.

General classification after stage 9

Rank	Rider	Team	Time
1	Rudy Pevenage (BEL)	IJsboerke–Warncke Eis–Koga Miyata	46h 02' 50"
2	Pierre Bazzo (FRA)	La Redoute–Motobécane	+ 2' 36"
3	Bernard Hinault (FRA)	Renault–Gitane–Campagnolo	+ 4' 12"
4	Joop Zoetemelk (NED)	TI–Raleigh–Creda	+ 6' 12"
5	Henk Lubberding (NED)	TI–Raleigh–Creda	+ 6' 15"
6	Hennie Kuiper (NED)	Peugeot–Esso–Michelin	+ 6' 36"
7	Johan van der Velde (NED)	TI–Raleigh–Creda	+ 6' 57"
8	Ronny Claes (BEL)	IJsboerke–Warncke Eis–Koga Miyata	+ 7' 24"
9	Patrick Bonnet (FRA)	Renault–Gitane–Campagnolo	+ 9' 32"
10	Jean-Luc Vandenbroucke (BEL)	La Redoute–Motobécane	s.t.

== Stage 10 ==
7 July 1980 — Rochefort to Bordeaux, 162 km (101 mi)

Stage 10 result

Rank	Rider	Team	Time
1	Cees Priem (NED)	TI–Raleigh–Creda	4h 42' 58"
2	Jacques Osmont (FRA)	Boston–Mavic–Amis du Tour	+ 2"
3	Yvon Bertin (FRA)	Renault–Gitane–Campagnolo	s.t.
4	Jan Raas (NED)	TI–Raleigh–Creda	s.t.
5	William Tackaert (BEL)	Daf Trucks–Lejeune–PZ	s.t.
6	Maurice Le Guilloux (FRA)	Renault–Gitane–Campagnolo	s.t.
7	Leo van Vliet (NED)	TI–Raleigh–Creda	s.t.
8	Philippe Durel (FRA)	Boston–Mavic–Amis du Tour	s.t.
9	Klaus-Peter Thaler (FRG)	Teka	s.t.
10	Jos Jacobs (BEL)	IJsboerke–Warncke Eis–Koga Miyata	s.t.

General classification after stage 10

Rank	Rider	Team	Time
1	Rudy Pevenage (BEL)	IJsboerke–Warncke Eis–Koga Miyata	50h 45' 42"
2	Pierre Bazzo (FRA)	La Redoute–Motobécane	+ 2' 44"
3	Bernard Hinault (FRA)	Renault–Gitane–Campagnolo	+ 4' 20"
4	Joop Zoetemelk (NED)	TI–Raleigh–Creda	+ 6' 20"
5	Henk Lubberding (NED)	TI–Raleigh–Creda	+ 6' 11"
6	Hennie Kuiper (NED)	Peugeot–Esso–Michelin	+ 6' 44"
7	Johan van der Velde (NED)	TI–Raleigh–Creda	+ 7' 05"
8	Ronny Claes (BEL)	IJsboerke–Warncke Eis–Koga Miyata	+ 7' 32"
9	Patrick Bonnet (FRA)	Renault–Gitane–Campagnolo	+ 9' 40"
10	Jean-Luc Vandenbroucke (BEL)	La Redoute–Motobécane	s.t.
