= 1980 Gent–Wevelgem =

Race details
- Dates: 2 April 1980
- Stages: 1
- Distance: 264 km (164 mi)
- Winning time: 6h 16' 00"

Results
	Winner	Henk Lubberding (NED)	(TI–Raleigh–Creda)
	Second	Alfons De Wolf (BEL)	(Boule d'Or–Studio Casa)
	Third	Piet van Katwijk (NED)	(TI–Raleigh–Creda)

The 1980 Gent–Wevelgem was the 42nd edition of the Belgian Gent–Wevelgem cycle race and was held on 2 April 1980. The race started in Ghent and finished in Wevelgem. The race was won by Henk Lubberding of the TI–Raleigh team.

== General classification ==
Final general classification

Rank	Rider	Team	Time
1	Henk Lubberding (NED)	TI–Raleigh–Creda	6h 16' 00"
2	Alfons De Wolf (BEL)	Boule d'Or–Studio Casa	+ 37"
3	Piet van Katwijk (NED)	TI–Raleigh–Creda	+ 37"
4	Jos Schipper (NED)	Marc–Carlos–V.R.D.–Woningbouw	+ 37"
5	Jan Bogaert (BEL)	Vermeer Thijs–Mini-Flat	+ 37"
6	Jan Raas (NED)	TI–Raleigh–Creda	+ 1' 10"
7	Willy Teirlinck (BEL)	Safir–Ludo	+ 1' 10"
8	Hennie Kuiper (NED)	Peugeot–Esso–Michelin	+ 1' 10"
9	Jo Maas (NED)	DAF Trucks–Lejeune	+ 1' 10"
10	Oscar Dierickx (BEL)	Safir–Ludo	+ 1' 10"
