= Gilbert Le Lay =

French cyclist

Personal information
- Born: 17 October 1952 (age 73)

Cycling career
- Sport: Cycling
- Role: Rider

Gilbert Le Lay (born 17 October 1952) is a French racing cyclist. He rode in the 1978 Tour de France.
