= Jean-François Pescheux =

French cyclist

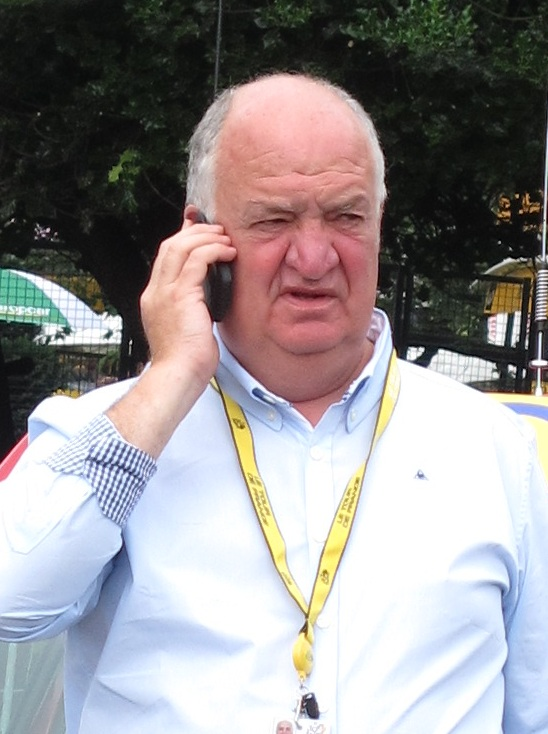

Personal information
- Born: 21 March 1952 (age 74)

Cycling career
- Sport: Cycling
- Role: Rider

Jean-François Pescheux (born 21 March 1952) is a French racing cyclist. He rode in the 1978 Tour de France.
