= Alain Patritti =

French cyclist

Personal information
- Born: 15 July 1953 (age 73)

Cycling career
- Sport: Cycling
- Role: Rider

Alain Patritti (born 15 July 1953) is a French racing cyclist. He rode in the 1978 Tour de France.
