= René Martens =

Belgian cyclist

Personal information
- Full name: René Martens
- Born: 27 May 1955 (age 71) Hasselt, Belgium

Cycling career
- Sport: Cycling
- Current team: Retired
- Discipline: Road
- Role: Rider

Professional teams
- 1978: C&A
- 1979: Flandria–Ça va seul
- 1980–1983: DAF Trucks–Lejeune
- 1984: Teka
- 1985–1986: Fagor
- 1987: S.E.F.B.–Gipiemme
- 1988–1989: AD Renting–Mini-Flat–Enerday
- 1990: IOC–Tulip Computers

Major wins
- Grand Tours Tour de France 1 individual stage (1981) One-day races and Classics Tour of Flanders (1982) Bordeaux–Paris (1985)

René Martens (Hasselt, 27 May 1955) is a Belgian former professional road bicycle racer. He notably won the 1982 Tour of Flanders and a stage of the 1981 Tour de France. He also competed in 13 Grand Tours, with his best finish being 24th overall in the 1982 Tour de France.

== Major results ==
1976
1st Overall Tour de Liège

1st Stages 4 (ITT) & 5

1st Triptyque Ardennaise
1st Internatie Reningelst
2nd Flèche Ardennaise
2nd Seraing–Aachen–Seraing
1977
1st Flèche Ardennaise
1st Circuit du Hainaut
2nd Overall Grand Prix François Faber

1st Stage 2b

10th Overall Trophée de l'Avenir
1978
4th Scheldeprijs
5th Druivenkoers Overijse
8th Paris–Brussels
1979 (2 pro wins)
1st Stages 4b (ITT) & 5 Setmana Catalana de Ciclisme
8th Paris–Brussels
1980
2nd Scheldeprijs
9th De Kustpijl
10th GP Eddy Merckx
1981 (1)
1st Stage 9 Tour de France
3rd Overall Ronde van Nederland
7th Overall Tour of Belgium
1982 (1)
1st Tour of Flanders
1st Flèche Hesbignonne
4th GP Stad Zottegem
5th GP Eddy Merckx
10th Grand Prix de Wallonie
1983 (1)
1st Schaal Sels
2nd Druivenkoers-Overijse
7th Coppa Bernocchi
8th Grand Prix Cerami
1984
8th Bordeaux–Paris
1985 (1)
1st Bordeaux–Paris
1986
2nd Nationale Sluitingprijs
9th Bordeaux–Paris
1987
1st Flèche Hesbignonne
4th Bordeaux–Paris
