= Philippe Durel =

French cyclist

Personal information
- Born: 13 August 1954 (age 72) Granville, Manche, France

Cycling career
- Sport: Cycling
- Role: Rider

Philippe Durel (born 13 August 1954) is a former French racing cyclist. He rode in the 1978 and 1980 Tour de France.
