= René Dillen =

Belgian cyclist

Personal information
- Born: 18 June 1951 (age 75) Wilrijk, Belgium

Cycling career
- Sport: Cycling
- Current team: Retired
- Discipline: Road
- Role: Rider

Professional teams
- 1973–1976: Sonolor
- 1977: Lejeune–BP
- 1978: C&A
- 1979: Kas–Campagnolo

René Dillen (born 18 June 1951) is a Belgian former professional racing cyclist. He rode in five editions of the Tour de France.

== Major results ==
1972
1st Fyen Rundt
3rd Grand Prix des Marbriers
1973
1st Kattekoers
1st Stage 9 Peace Race
1974
1st Stage 2 GP du Midi-Libre
2nd Grand Prix d'Isbergues
1975
1st Stage 5 Four Days of Dunkirk
1977
1st Stage 3 Tour de Romandie
1st Stage 2 Tour de Suisse
1979
2nd Schaal Sels
