= Henk Lubberding =

Dutch cyclist (born 1953)

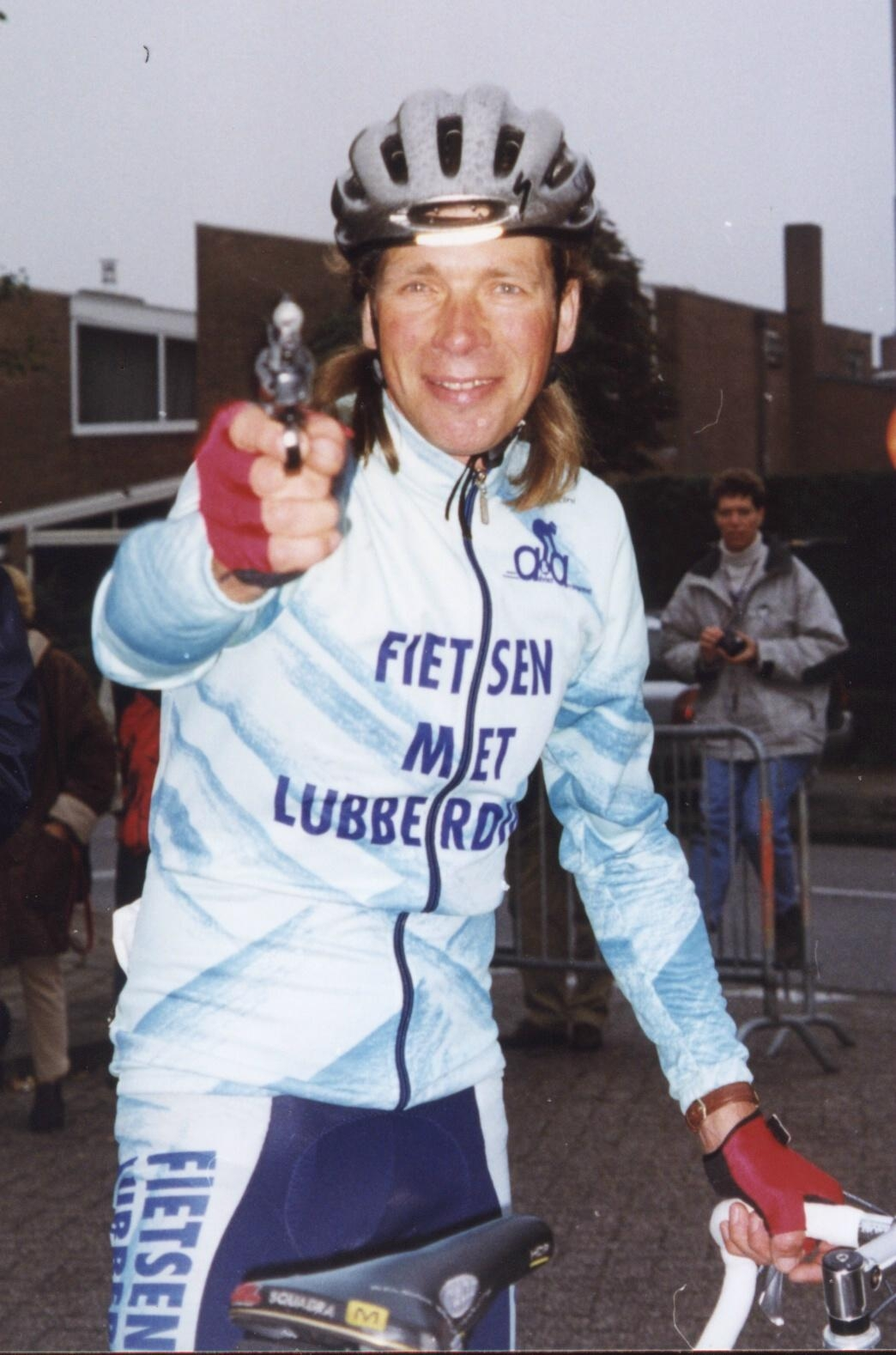

Personal information
- Full name: Henk Lubberding
- Born: 4 August 1953 (age 73) Voorst, Netherlands

Cycling career
- Sport: Cycling
- Discipline: Road
- Role: Rider

Professional teams
- 1977–1983: TI–Raleigh
- 1984–1992: Panasonic–Raleigh

Major wins
- Grand Tours Tour de France Young rider classification (1978) 3 individual stages (1978, 1980, 1983) 6 TTT stages (1980, 1981, 1982, 1988) One-day races and Classics National Road Race Championships (1978, 1979) Gent–Wevelgem (1980)

Henk Lubberding (born 4 August 1953 in Voorst) is a Dutch former professional road bicycle racer. He was a professional from 1977 to 1992.

As an amateur, he finished third in the 1976 Tour de l'Avenir. The following year he turned professional with the Dutch cycling team TI–Raleighof Peter Post. Lubberding stayed his entire career in teams directed by Post. In 1978, Lubberding was road race champion of the Netherlands and won a stage in the 1978 Tour de France, finishing eighth overall and best young rider. He was a good mountain climber despite being tall, and from the low lands of Holland.

After team leader Hennie Kuiper left, Lubberding and Paul Wellens became co-leaders and Lubberding performed well throughout 1979 with high placings in Paris–Nice, the Amstel Gold Race, Gent–Wevelgem, Tour de Romandie, Rund um den Henninger-Turm and the Critérium du Dauphiné Libéré. He won the Dutch road race title again and finished 18th in the 1979 Tour de France. His role of team leader ended in 1979.

Lubberding helped Jan Raas win the world championship in 1979. He also helped Joop Zoetemelk win the 1980 Tour de France. He won two more stages in the Tour de France and wore the yellow jersey as leader of the general classification in 1988.

Lubberding worked on his farm, even during his racing period.

He retired at the end of 1992 with 58 victories including Gent–Wevelgem.

== Major results ==
1975
1st Ronde van Limburg
1976
3rd Overall Trophée Peugeot de l'Avenir

1st Stage 6

1977
2nd Tour du Haut Var
7th Overall Vuelta a Andalucía
1978
1st Road race, National Road Championships
1st Stage 4a Tour de Suisse
2nd Overall Tour d'Indre-et-Loire
6th Overall Paris–Nice
8th Overall Tour de France

1st Young rider classification
1st Stage 10

8th La Flèche Wallonne
8th Grand Prix des Nations
10th Overall Tour Méditerranéen
1979
1st Road race, National Road Championships
1st Prologue Tour d'Indre-et-Loire
2nd Overall Critérium du Dauphiné Libéré
2nd Amstel Gold Race
2nd Rund um den Henninger-Turm
3rd Overall Tour de Romandie

1st Prologue

3rd Grand Prix de Cannes
3rd Trofeo Baracchi (with Bert Oosterbosch)
4th Overall Paris–Nice
5th Road race, UCI Road World Championships
5th Gent–Wevelgem
5th E3 Prijs Vlaanderen
8th Overall Tour de Suisse

1st Stage 9a

8th Brabantse Pijl
9th Milano–Torino
9th Züri-Metzgete
1980
1st Gent–Wevelgem
1st Stage 7a (ITT) Volta a Catalunya
2nd Overall Tour Méditerranéen

1st Stage 5

5th Overall Étoile de Bessèges

1st Stage 2

6th La Flèche Wallonne
7th Overall Paris–Nice
8th Road race, National Road Championships
8th Overall Ronde van Nederland

1st Stage 5b (TTT)

9th Overall Grand Prix du Midi Libre
10th Overall Tour de France

1st Stages 1b (TTT), 3 & 7a (TTT)

10th Paris–Brussels
1981
Tour de France

1st Stages 1b (TTT) & 4 (TTT)

5th Overall Tour de Suisse
5th E3 Prijs Vlaanderen
6th Road race, National Road Championships
6th Grand Prix Pino Cerami
7th Overall Tirreno–Adriatico
9th Overall Ronde van Nederland

1st Stage 5b (TTT)

1982
1st Stage 9a (TTT) Tour de France
1st Stage 5b (TTT) Ronde van Nederland
5th Road race, National Road Championships
9th Gent–Wevelgem
1983
1st Stage 4 Tour de Romandie
2nd Road race, National Road Championships
2nd Ronde van Limburg
5th Liège–Bastogne–Liège
7th Overall Volta a Catalunya
8th Overall Ronde van Nederland

1st Stage 3b (TTT)

10th Overall Tour de France

1st Stage 13

10th Overall Tour Méditerranéen
1984
1st Stage 7 (TTT) Ronde van Nederland
2nd Road race, National Road Championships
6th La Flèche Wallonne
1985
1st Overall Tour of Norway

1st Stage 2

1st Stage 4a Tour Méditerranéen
1st Stage 5b (TTT) Ronde van Nederland
4th Veenendaal–Veenendaal
5th Züri-Metzgete
1986
8th Overall Étoile de Bessèges
9th E3 Prijs Vlaanderen
1987
3rd Rund um den Henninger-Turm
1988
Tour de France

1st Stage 2 (TTT)
Held after Stage 5

4th Grand Prix d'Isbergues
10th Overall Ronde van Nederland
1989
2nd Overall Tour de Trump

1st Stage 2

8th Grand Prix d'Isbergues
1992
6th Veenendaal–Veenendaal

=== Grand Tour general classification results timeline ===
Grand Tour	1977	1978	1979	1980	1981	1982	1983	1984	1985	1986	1987	1988	1989	1990	1991
Vuelta a España	—	—	—	—	—	—	—	—	—	—	—	—	—	—	97
Giro d'Italia	—	—	—	—	—	—	—	—	—	96	69	69	69	—	—
Tour de France	26	8	18	10	54	46	10	40	82	DNF	95	DNF	119	—	—

Legend
—	Did not compete
DNF	Did not finish

== See also ==
- List of Dutch cyclists who have led the Tour de France general classification

Sporting positions
Preceded by Fedor den Hertog	Dutch National Road Race Champion; 1978,1979	Succeeded by Johan van der Velde
