= Bernard Bourreau =

French cyclist

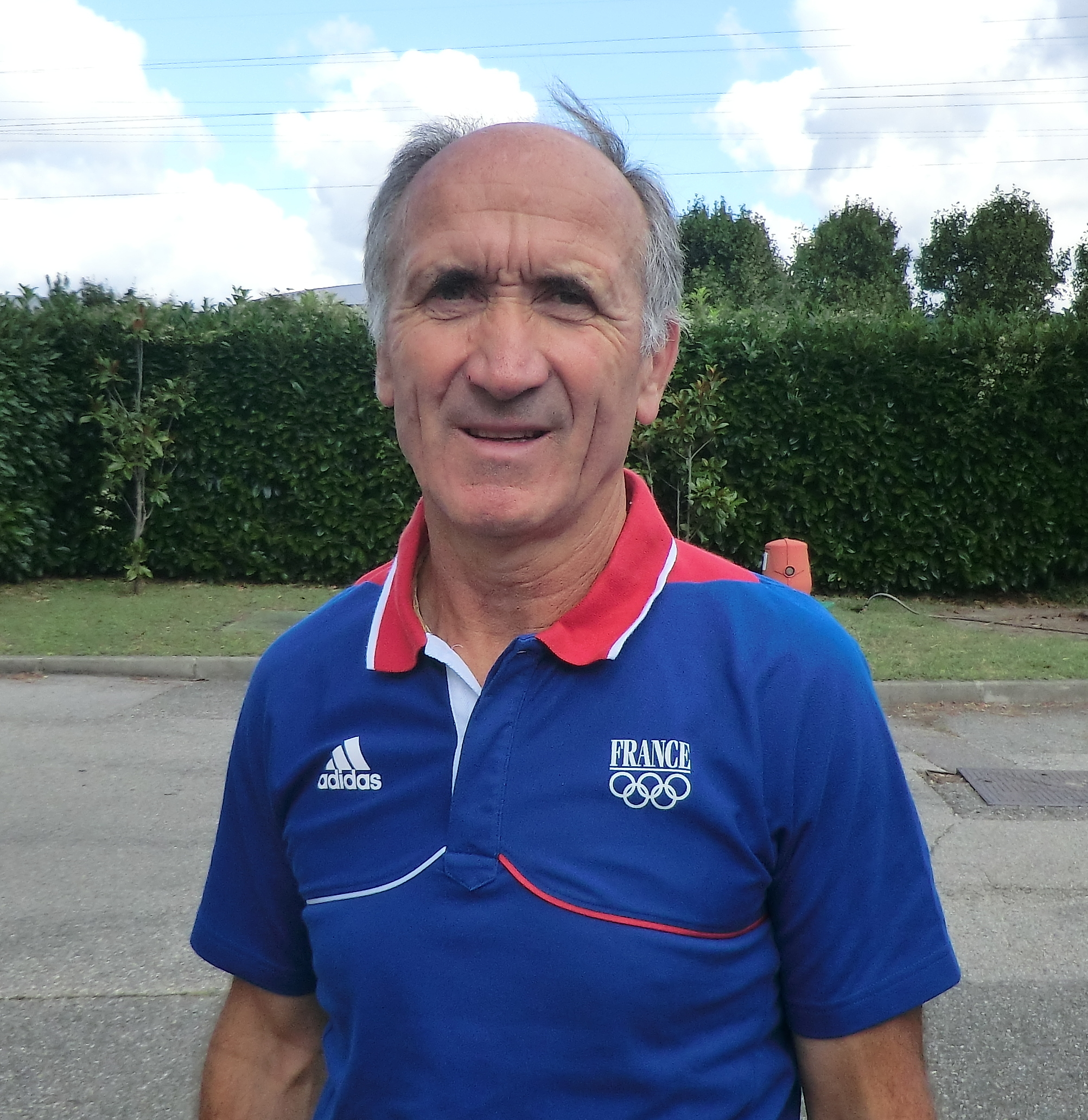
- Bourreau in 2013

Personal information
- Born: 2 September 1951 (age 75) Garat, Charente, France

Cycling career
- Sport: Cycling

Bernard Bourreau (born 2 September 1951) is a French former cyclist. He competed in the individual road race at the 1972 Summer Olympics. His sporting career began with CA Cicray-Maison Minor.
