= Dominique Sanders =

French cyclist

Personal information
- Born: 16 August 1957 (age 69) Montastruc-la-Conseillère, France

Cycling career
- Sport: Cycling
- Role: Rider

Dominique Sanders (born 16 August 1957) is a former French racing cyclist. He rode in three editions of the Tour de France between 1978 and 1980.
