= C&A (cycling team) =

Team information
- Registered: Belgium
- Founded: 1978
- Disbanded: 1978
- Discipline: Road
- Bicycles: De Rosa

Key personnel
- General manager: Rudi Altig; Jos Huysmans

Team name history
- 1978: C&A
C&A jersey
Jersey

C&A was a Belgian professional cycling team that existed in 1978. The team was formed after the Fiat France team ended the previous season. It was sponsored by Dutch clothing retailer C&A, who only came into the sport to sponsor a team that had Eddy Merckx on its roster. Merckx, who had ridden with Fiat France, was at the end of his career and he quit the team in March 1978.

== Team roster ==
The following is a list of riders on the C&A squad during the 1978 season, with age given for 1 January 1978.

Rider	Date of birth
Joseph Bruyère (BEL)	5 October 1948 (aged 29)
Étienne De Beule (BEL)	20 November 1953 (aged 24)
Jos Deschoenmaecker (BEL)	2 October 1947 (aged 30)
René Dillen (BEL)	18 June 1951 (aged 26)
Edward Janssens (BEL)	18 January 1946 (aged 31)
Marcel Laurens (BEL)	21 June 1952 (aged 25)
Ludo Loos (BEL)	13 January 1955 (aged 22)
René Martens (BEL)	27 May 1955 (aged 22)
Martin Jacques (BEL)	16 April 1952 (aged 25)

Rider	Date of birth
Eddy Merckx (BEL)	17 June 1945 (aged 32)
Robert Mintkiewicz (FRA)	14 October 1947 (aged 30)
Walter Planckaert (BEL)	8 April 1948 (aged 29)
Willy Planckaert (BEL)	5 April 1944 (aged 33)
Eddy Schepers (BEL)	12 December 1955 (aged 22)
Guido Van Calster (BEL)	6 February 1956 (aged 21)
Etienne Van der Helst (BEL)	7 July 1953 (aged 24)
Frank Van Impe (BEL)	1 June 1955 (aged 22)
Lucien Van Impe (BEL)	20 October 1946 (aged 31)
