= Yvon Bertin =

French cyclist

Personal information
- Full name: Yvon Bertin
- Born: 9 April 1953 (age 73) Nantes, France

Cycling career
- Sport: Cycling
- Disciplines: Road & Track
- Role: Rider

Professional teams
- 1975–1976: Gan - Mercier
- 1977: Miko - Mercier
- 1978–1980: Renault - Gitane
- 1981: Renault - Elf
- 1982: Coop - Mercier

Yvon Bertin (born 9 April 1953 in Nantes, France) is a former French professional road bicycle racer. He was professional from 1975 to 1982 where he won 11 victories. He wore the yellow jersey for one day in the 1980 Tour de France. Victories included Grand Prix d'Isbergues in 1976, Grand Prix des Rennes 1979 and two stages and overall victory in the Route du Sud of 1979.

== Palmarès ==
1976
Grand Prix d'Isbergues
1979
Grand Prix de Rennes
Route du Sud
1980
Sainte-Marie sur Mer
Tour de France:

Wearing yellow jersey for one day
