= List of teams and cyclists in the 1980 Tour de France =

List of cyclists

The 1980 Tour de France was the 67th edition of Tour de France, one of cycling's Grand Tours. The Tour began in Frankfurt on 26 June and finished on the Champs-Élysées in Paris on 20 July. The Tour started with 13 teams, with 10 cyclists each.

- Renault–Gitane–Campagnolo
- TI–Raleigh–Creda
- Puch–Sem–Campagnolo
- Peugeot–Esso–Michelin
- Daf Trucks–Lejeune–PZ
- Splendor–Admiral–TV Ekspres
- Marc–IWC–VRD
- Miko–Mercier–Vivagel
- La Redoute–Motobécane
- IJsboerke–Warncke Eis–Koga Miyata
- Boston–Mavic–Amis du Tour
- Teka
- Kelme

== Start list ==
=== By team ===
Renault–Gitane–Campagnolo
No.	Rider	Pos.
1	Bernard Hinault (FRA)	DNF
2	Hubert Arbès (FRA)	DNF
3	Bernard Becaas (FRA)	76
4	Jean-René Bernaudeau (FRA)	DNF
5	Yvon Bertin (FRA)	DNF
6	Patrick Bonnet (FRA)	34
7	Jean Chassang (FRA)	74
8	Maurice Le Guilloux (FRA)	81
9	Bernard Quilfen (FRA)	DNF
10	Pierre-Raymond Villemiane (FRA)	70
Directeur sportif: Cyrille Guimard

TI–Raleigh–Creda
No.	Rider	Pos.
11	Joop Zoetemelk (NED)	1
12	Gerrie Knetemann (NED)	38
13	Henk Lubberding (NED)	10
14	Bert Oosterbosch (NED)	36
15	Cees Priem (NED)	DNF
16	Bert Pronk (NED)	DNF
17	Jan Raas (NED)	DNF
18	Johan van der Velde (NED)	12
19	Leo van Vliet (NED)	51
20	Paul Wellens (BEL)	56
Directeur sportif: Peter Post

Puch–Sem–Campagnolo
No.	Rider	Pos.
21	Joaquim Agostinho (POR)	5
22	Patrick Busolini (FRA)	21
23	Marco Antonio Chagas Martins (POR)	41
24	Alain De Carvalho (FRA)	DNF
25	Hans-Peter Jakst (FRG)	62
26	Jacques Michaud (FRA)	72
27	Régis Ovion (FRA)	15
28	Dietrich Thurau (FRG)	DNF
29	Jean-Raymond Toso (FRA)	48
30	Jostein Wilmann (NOR)	14
Directeur sportif: Rudi Altig

Peugeot–Esso–Michelin
No.	Rider	Pos.
31	Hennie Kuiper (NED)	2
32	Jacques Bossis (FRA)	59
33	Frédéric Brun (FRA)	75
34	Bernard Bourreau (FRA)	40
35	Gilbert Duclos-Lassalle (FRA)	DNF
36	Graham Jones (GBR)	49
37	Roger Legeay (FRA)	84
38	Hubert Linard (FRA)	46
39	Patrick Perret (FRA)	71
40	Pascal Simon (FRA)	28
Directeur sportif: Maurice De Muer

Daf Trucks–Lejeune–PZ
No.	Rider	Pos.
41	Jo Maas (NED)	19
42	Hendrik Devos (BEL)	63
43	Dirk Heirweg (BEL)	DNF
44	Hans Langerijs (NED)	DNF
45	René Martens (BEL)	30
46	Guy Nulens (BEL)	DNF
47	Patrick Pevenage (BEL)	79
48	Eddy Schepers (BEL)	26
49	Hennie Stamsnijder (NED)	DNF
50	William Tackaert (BEL)	82
Directeur sportif: Alfred De Bruyne

Splendor–Admiral–TV Ekspres
No.	Rider	Pos.
51	Michel Pollentier (BEL)	DNF
52	Herman Beysens (BEL)	78
53	Joseph Borguet (BEL)	52
54	Claude Criquielion (BEL)	13
55	Johan De Muynck (BEL)	4
56	Alain Desaever (BEL)	DNF
57	Sean Kelly (IRL)	29
58	Alain Meslet (FRA)	DNF
59	Daniel Plummer (BEL)	27
60	Guido Van Calster (BEL)	39
Directeur sportif: Albert De Kimpe

Marc–IWC–VRD
No.	Rider	Pos.
61	Lucien Van Impe (BEL)	16
62	Jos Deschoenmaecker (BEL)	66
63	Marc Dierickx (BEL)	DNF
64	Frank Hoste (BEL)	DNF
65	Charles Jochums (BEL)	DNF
66	Marcel Laurens (BEL)	64
67	Ludo Loos (BEL)	18
68	Marc Renier (BEL)	DNF
69	Jos Schipper (NED)	83
70	Gerhard Schönbacher (AUT)	85
Directeur sportif: Patrick Lefevere

Miko–Mercier–Vivagel
No.	Rider	Pos.
71	Sven-Åke Nilsson (SWE)	7
72	René Bittinger (FRA)	DNF
73	Patrick Friou (FRA)	43
74	Joël Gallopin (FRA)	77
75	Jean-Louis Gauthier (FRA)	50
76	Didier Lebaud (FRA)	61
77	Christian Levavasseur (FRA)	44
78	Raymond Martin (FRA)	3
79	Hubert Mathis (FRA)	DNF
80	Christian Seznec (FRA)	6
Directeur sportif: Jean-Pierre Danguillaume

La Redoute–Motobécane
No.	Rider	Pos.
81	Mariano Martínez (FRA)	32
82	Robert Alban (FRA)	11
83	Pierre Bazzo (FRA)	9
84	Christian Jourdan (FRA)	DNF
85	Jean-Marie Michel (FRA)	DNF
86	Paul Sherwen (GBR)	DNF
87	Bernard Vallet (FRA)	31
88	Didier Vanoverschelde (FRA)	45
89	Jean-Luc Vandenbroucke (BEL)	33
90	Ferdi Van Den Haute (BEL)	53
Directeur sportif: Philippe Crépel

IJsboerke–Warncke Eis–Koga Miyata
No.	Rider	Pos.
91	Gery Verlinden (BEL)	22
92	Ronny Claes (BEL)	DNF
93	Ludo Delcroix (BEL)	47
94	Eric Van De Wiele (BEL)	73
95	Jos Jacobs (BEL)	60
96	Ludo Peeters (BEL)	8
97	Rudy Pevenage (BEL)	42
98	Pol Verschuere (BEL)	65
99	Dirk Wayenberg (BEL)	67
100	Ludwig Wijnants (BEL)	68
Directeur sportif: Walter Godefroot

Boston–Mavic–Amis du Tour
No.	Rider	Pos.
101	Paul De Keyser (BEL)	DNF
102	Philippe Durel (FRA)	DNF
103	Erich Jagsch (AUT)	DNF
104	Jan Jonkers (NED)	69
105	Ferdinand Julien (FRA)	23
106	Jacques Osmont (FRA)	DNF
107	Philippe Tesnière (FRA)	DNF
108	Patrice Thévenard (FRA)	55
109	Benjamin Vermeulen (BEL)	DNF
110	Alain Vigneron (FRA)	58
Directeur sportif: Robert Lauwers

Teka
No.	Rider	Pos.
111	Bernard Thévenet (FRA)	17
112	Bernardo Alfonsel (ESP)	57
113	Rolf Haller (FRG)	DNF
114	Manuel Esparza (ESP)	DNF
115	Alberto Fernández de la Puebla (ESP)	25
116	Ismael Lejarreta (ESP)	24
117	Paulino Martínez (ESP)	DNF
118	José Luis Mayoz (ESP)	54
119	Dominique Sanders (FRA)	DNF
120	Klaus-Peter Thaler (FRG)	37
Directeur sportif: Domingo Perurena

Kelme
No.	Rider	Pos.
121	Pedro Torres (ESP)	35
122	Francisco Albelda (ESP)	DNF
123	Vicente Belda (ESP)	20
124	Francisco Fernández Moreno (ESP)	DNF
125	Jorge Fortia (ESP)	80
126	Francisco Galdós (ESP)	DNF
127	Jesús Guzmán (ESP)	DNF
128	Andrés Oliva (ESP)	DNF
129	Juan Pujol (ESP)	DNF
130	Felipe Yáñez (ESP)	DNF
Directeur sportif: Rafael Carrasco Guerra

=== By rider ===
Legend
No.	Starting number worn by the rider during the Tour
Pos.	Position in the general classification
DNF	Denotes a rider who did not finish

No.	Name	Nationality	Team	Pos.	Time	Ref
1	Bernard Hinault	France	Renault–Gitane–Campagnolo	DNF	—	
2	Hubert Arbès	France	Renault–Gitane–Campagnolo	DNF	—	
3	Bernard Becaas	France	Renault–Gitane–Campagnolo	76	+ 1h 45' 09"	
4	Jean-René Bernaudeau	France	Renault–Gitane–Campagnolo	DNF	—	
5	Yvon Bertin	France	Renault–Gitane–Campagnolo	DNF	—	
6	Patrick Bonnet	France	Renault–Gitane–Campagnolo	34	+ 1h 01' 38"	
7	Jean Chassang	France	Renault–Gitane–Campagnolo	74	+ 1h 44' 34"	
8	Maurice Le Guilloux	France	Renault–Gitane–Campagnolo	81	+ 1h 53' 09"	
9	Bernard Quilfen	France	Renault–Gitane–Campagnolo	DNF	—	
10	Pierre-Raymond Villemiane	France	Renault–Gitane–Campagnolo	70	+ 1h 32' 59"	
11	Joop Zoetemelk	Netherlands	TI–Raleigh–Creda	1	109h 19' 14"	
12	Gerrie Knetemann	Netherlands	TI–Raleigh–Creda	38	+ 1h 06' 23"	
13	Henk Lubberding	Netherlands	TI–Raleigh–Creda	10	+ 21' 10"	
14	Bert Oosterbosch	Netherlands	TI–Raleigh–Creda	36	+ 1h 02' 59"	
15	Cees Priem	Netherlands	TI–Raleigh–Creda	DNF	—	
16	Bert Pronk	Netherlands	TI–Raleigh–Creda	DNF	—	
17	Jan Raas	Netherlands	TI–Raleigh–Creda	DNF	—	
18	Johan van der Velde	Netherlands	TI–Raleigh–Creda	12	+ 25' 28"	
19	Leo van Vliet	Netherlands	TI–Raleigh–Creda	51	+ 1h 21' 38"	
20	Paul Wellens	Belgium	TI–Raleigh–Creda	56	+ 1h 23' 53"	
21	Joaquim Agostinho	Portugal	Puch–Sem–Campagnolo	5	+ 15' 37"	
22	Patrick Busolini	France	Puch–Sem–Campagnolo	21	+ 45' 35"	
23	Marco Antonio Chagas Martins	Portugal	Puch–Sem–Campagnolo	41	+ 1h 07' 34"	
24	Alain De Carvalho	France	Puch–Sem–Campagnolo	DNF	—	
25	Hans-Peter Jakst	West Germany	Puch–Sem–Campagnolo	62	+ 1h 27' 59"	
26	Jacques Michaud	France	Puch–Sem–Campagnolo	72	+ 1h 41' 36"	
27	Régis Ovion	France	Puch–Sem–Campagnolo	15	+ 29' 48"	
28	Dietrich Thurau	West Germany	Puch–Sem–Campagnolo	DNF	—	
29	Jean-Raymond Toso	France	Puch–Sem–Campagnolo	48	+ 1h 19' 20"	
30	Jostein Wilmann	Norway	Puch–Sem–Campagnolo	14	+ 28' 04"	
31	Hennie Kuiper	Netherlands	Peugeot–Esso–Michelin	2	+ 6' 55"	
32	Jacques Bossis	France	Peugeot–Esso–Michelin	59	+ 1h 25' 30"	
33	Frédéric Brun	France	Peugeot–Esso–Michelin	75	+ 1h 44' 51	
34	Bernard Bourreau	France	Peugeot–Esso–Michelin	40	+ 1h 07' 11"	
35	Gilbert Duclos-Lassalle	France	Peugeot–Esso–Michelin	DNF	—	
36	Graham Jones	Great Britain	Peugeot–Esso–Michelin	49	+ 1h 20' 33"	
37	Roger Legeay	France	Peugeot–Esso–Michelin	84	+ 1h 59' 40"	
38	Hubert Linard	France	Peugeot–Esso–Michelin	46	+ 1h 11' 52"	
39	Patrick Perret	France	Peugeot–Esso–Michelin	71	+ 1h 38' 11"	
40	Pascal Simon	France	Peugeot–Esso–Michelin	28	+ 58' 51"	
41	Jo Maas	Netherlands	Daf Trucks–Lejeune–PZ	19	+ 36' 44"	
42	Hendrik Devos	Belgium	Daf Trucks–Lejeune–PZ	63	+ 1h 28' 49"	
43	Dirk Heirweg	Belgium	Daf Trucks–Lejeune–PZ	DNF	—	
44	Hans Langerijs	Netherlands	Daf Trucks–Lejeune–PZ	DNF	—	
45	René Martens	Belgium	Daf Trucks–Lejeune–PZ	30	+ 59' 06"	
46	Guy Nulens	Belgium	Daf Trucks–Lejeune–PZ	DNF	—	
47	Patrick Pevenage	Belgium	Daf Trucks–Lejeune–PZ	79	+ 1h 49' 54"	
48	Eddy Schepers	Belgium	Daf Trucks–Lejeune–PZ	26	+ 55' 32"	
49	Hennie Stamsnijder	Netherlands	Daf Trucks–Lejeune–PZ	DNF	—	
50	William Tackaert	Belgium	Daf Trucks–Lejeune–PZ	82	+ 1h 57' 08"	
51	Michel Pollentier	Belgium	Splendor–Admiral–TV Ekspres	DNF	—	
52	Herman Beysens	Belgium	Splendor–Admiral–TV Ekspres	78	+ 1h 48' 19"	
53	Joseph Borguet	Belgium	Splendor–Admiral–TV Ekspres	52	+ 1h 22' 02"	
54	Claude Criquielion	Belgium	Splendor–Admiral–TV Ekspres	13	+ 27' 43"	
55	Johan De Muynck	Belgium	Splendor–Admiral–TV Ekspres	4	+ 12' 24"	
56	Alain Desaever	Belgium	Splendor–Admiral–TV Ekspres	DNF	—	
57	Sean Kelly	Ireland	Splendor–Admiral–TV Ekspres	29	+ 58' 54"	
58	Alain Meslet	France	Splendor–Admiral–TV Ekspres	DNF	—	
59	Daniel Plummer	Belgium	Splendor–Admiral–TV Ekspres	27	+ 58' 46"	
60	Guido Van Calster	Belgium	Splendor–Admiral–TV Ekspres	39	+ 1h 06' 46"	
61	Lucien Van Impe	Belgium	Marc–IWC–VRD	16	+ 32' 55"	
62	Jos Deschoenmaecker	Belgium	Marc–IWC–VRD	66	+ 1h 31' 03"	
63	Marc Dierickx	Belgium	Marc–IWC–VRD	DNF	—	
64	Frank Hoste	Belgium	Marc–IWC–VRD	DNF	—	
65	Charles Jochums	Belgium	Marc–IWC–VRD	DNF	—	
66	Marcel Laurens	Belgium	Marc–IWC–VRD	64	+ 1h 29' 36"	
67	Ludo Loos	Belgium	Marc–IWC–VRD	18	+ 36' 36"	
68	Marc Renier	Belgium	Marc–IWC–VRD	DNF	—	
69	Jos Schipper	Netherlands	Marc–IWC–VRD	83	+ 1h 59' 29"	
70	Gerhard Schönbacher	Austria	Marc–IWC–VRD	85	+ 2h 10' 52"	
71	Sven-Åke Nilsson	Sweden	Miko–Mercier–Vivagel	7	+ 16' 33"	
72	René Bittinger	France	Miko–Mercier–Vivagel	DNF	—	
73	Patrick Friou	France	Miko–Mercier–Vivagel	43	+ 1h 09' 34"	
74	Joël Gallopin	France	Miko–Mercier–Vivagel	77	+ 1h 46' 12"	
75	Jean-Louis Gauthier	France	Miko–Mercier–Vivagel	50	+ 1h 20' 58"	
76	Didier Lebaud	France	Miko–Mercier–Vivagel	61	+ 1h 26' 44"	
77	Christian Levavasseur	France	Miko–Mercier–Vivagel	44	+ 1h 11' 18"	
78	Raymond Martin	France	Miko–Mercier–Vivagel	3	+ 7' 56"	
79	Hubert Mathis	France	Miko–Mercier–Vivagel	DNF	—	
80	Christian Seznec	France	Miko–Mercier–Vivagel	6	+ 16' 16"	
81	Mariano Martínez	France	La Redoute–Motobécane	32	+ 1h 01' 06"	
82	Robert Alban	France	La Redoute–Motobécane	11	+ 22' 41"	
83	Pierre Bazzo	France	La Redoute–Motobécane	9	+ 21' 03"	
84	Christian Jourdan	France	La Redoute–Motobécane	DNF	—	
85	Jean-Marie Michel	France	La Redoute–Motobécane	DNF	—	
86	Paul Sherwen	Great Britain	La Redoute–Motobécane	DNF	—	
87	Bernard Vallet	France	La Redoute–Motobécane	31	+ 59' 11"	
88	Didier Vanoverschelde	France	La Redoute–Motobécane	45	+ 1h 11' 32"	
89	Jean-Luc Vandenbroucke	Belgium	La Redoute–Motobécane	33	+ 1h 01' 30"	
90	Ferdi Van Den Haute	Belgium	La Redoute–Motobécane	53	+ 1h 22' 25"	
91	Gery Verlinden	Belgium	IJsboerke–Warncke Eis–Koga Miyata	22	+ 52' 17"	
92	Ronny Claes	Belgium	IJsboerke–Warncke Eis–Koga Miyata	DNF	—	
93	Ludo Delcroix	Belgium	IJsboerke–Warncke Eis–Koga Miyata	47	+ 1h 16' 14"	
94	Eric Van De Wiele	Belgium	IJsboerke–Warncke Eis–Koga Miyata	73	+ 1h 41' 38"	
95	Jos Jacobs	Belgium	IJsboerke–Warncke Eis–Koga Miyata	60	+ 1h 25' 44"	
96	Ludo Peeters	Belgium	IJsboerke–Warncke Eis–Koga Miyata	8	+ 20' 45"	
97	Rudy Pevenage	Belgium	IJsboerke–Warncke Eis–Koga Miyata	42	+ 1h 08' 02"	
98	Pol Verschuere	Belgium	IJsboerke–Warncke Eis–Koga Miyata	65	+ 1h 30' 05"	
99	Dirk Wayenberg	Belgium	IJsboerke–Warncke Eis–Koga Miyata	67	+ 1h 31' 07"	
100	Ludwig Wijnants	Belgium	IJsboerke–Warncke Eis–Koga Miyata	68	+ 1h 31' 09"	
101	Paul De Keyser	Belgium	Boston–Mavic–Amis du Tour	DNF	—	
102	Philippe Durel	France	Boston–Mavic–Amis du Tour	DNF	—	
103	Erich Jagsch	Austria	Boston–Mavic–Amis du Tour	DNF	—	
104	Jan Jonkers	Netherlands	Boston–Mavic–Amis du Tour	69	+ 1h 32' 36"	
105	Ferdinand Julien	France	Boston–Mavic–Amis du Tour	23	+ 52' 37"	
106	Jacques Osmont	France	Boston–Mavic–Amis du Tour	DNF	—	
107	Philippe Tesnière	France	Boston–Mavic–Amis du Tour	DNF	—	
108	Patrice Thévenard	France	Boston–Mavic–Amis du Tour	55	+ 1h 23' 47"	
109	Benjamin Vermeulen	Belgium	Boston–Mavic–Amis du Tour	DNF	—	
110	Alain Vigneron	France	Boston–Mavic–Amis du Tour	58	+ 1h 25' 23"	
111	Bernard Thévenet	France	Teka	17	+ 32' 59"	
112	Bernardo Alfonsel	Spain	Teka	57	+ 1h 25' 10"	
113	Rolf Haller	West Germany	Teka	DNF	—	
114	Manuel Esparza	Spain	Teka	DNF	—	
115	Alberto Fernández de la Puebla	Spain	Teka	25	+ 55' 17"	
116	Ismael Lejarreta	Spain	Teka	24	+ 54' 05"	
117	Paulino Martínez	Spain	Teka	DNF	—	
118	José Luis Mayoz	Spain	Teka	54	+ 1h 22' 41"	
119	Dominique Sanders	France	Teka	DNF	—	
120	Klaus-Peter Thaler	West Germany	Teka	37	+ 1h 05' 03"	
121	Pedro Torres	Spain	Kelme	35	+ 1h 02' 25"	
122	Francisco Albelda	Spain	Kelme	DNF	—	
123	Vicente Belda	Spain	Kelme	20	+ 42' 42"	
124	Francisco Fernández Moreno	Spain	Kelme	DNF	—	
125	Jorge Fortia	Spain	Kelme	80	+ 1h 52' 22"	
126	Francisco Galdós	Spain	Kelme	DNF	—	
127	Jesús Guzmán	Spain	Kelme	DNF	—	
128	Andrés Oliva	Spain	Kelme	DNF	—	
129	Juan Pujol	Spain	Kelme	DNF	—	
130	Felipe Yáñez	Spain	Kelme	DNF	—	

=== By nationality ===
The 130 riders that competed in the 1980 Tour de France represented 11 different countries. Riders from four countries won stages during the race; Dutch riders won the largest number of stages.

Country	No. of riders	Finishers	Stage wins
Austria	2	1	
Belgium	38	27	5 (Rudy Pevenage, Ludo Peeters, Jos Deschoenmaecker, Ludo Loos, Pol Verschuere)
France	48	32	7 (Bernard Hinault ×3, Jean-Louis Gauthier, Raymond Martin, Bernard Vallet, Mariano Martínez)
Ireland	1	1	2 (Sean Kelly ×2)
Netherlands	15	10	9 (Jan Raas ×3, Henk Lubberding, Bert Oosterbosch, Cees Priem, Joop Zoetemelk ×2, Gerrie Knetemann)
Norway	1	1	
Portugal	2	2	
Spain	16	7	
Sweden	1	1	
Great Britain	2	1	
West Germany	4	2	
Total	130	85	23 (Note: The team time trials on stages 1b and 7a, both won by TI–Raleigh–Creda, are not counted in this total.)
