= 1980 Tour de France, Stage 11 to Stage 22 =

Cycling race stages

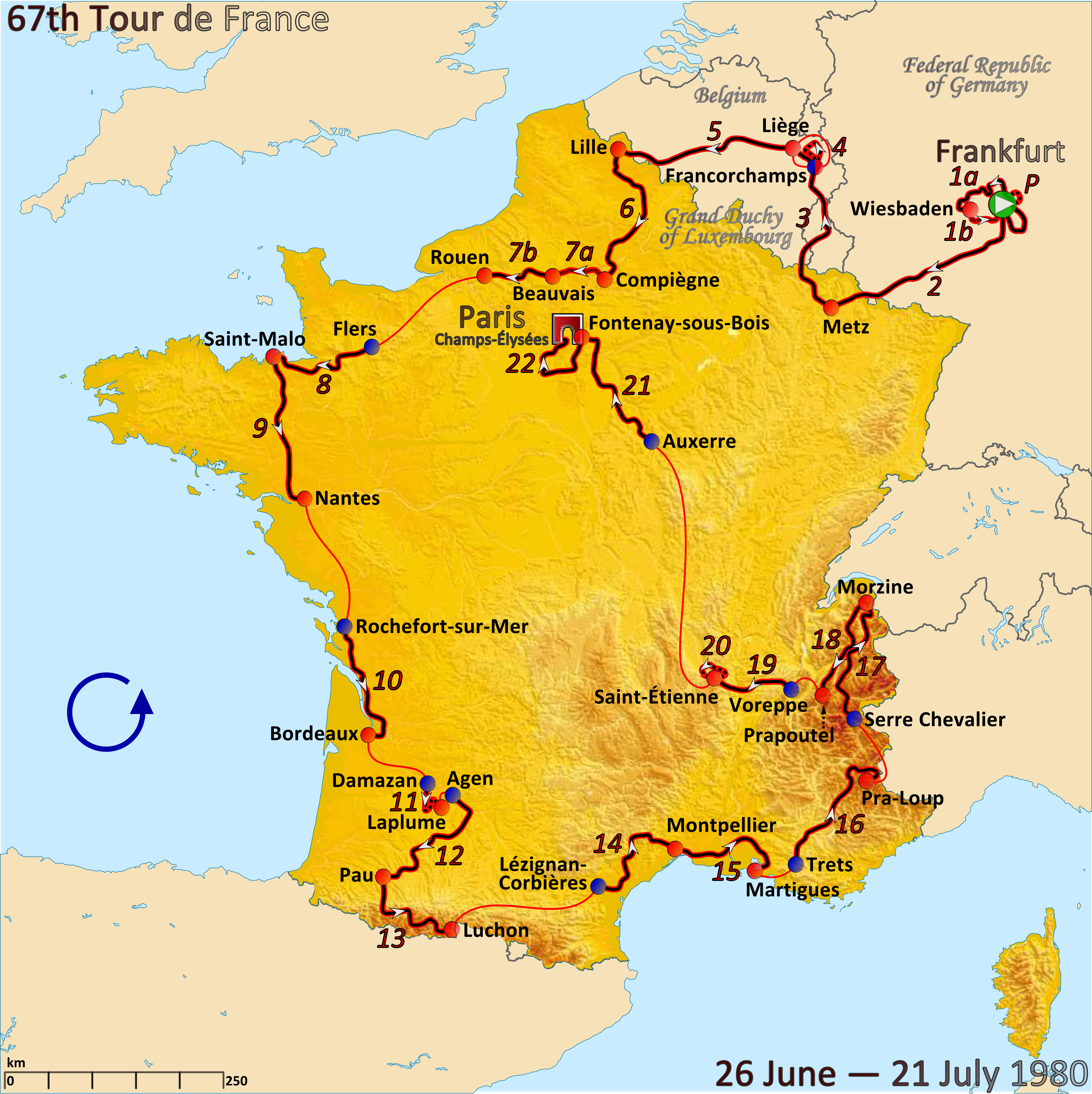
Route of the 1980 Tour de France

The 1980 Tour de France was the 67th edition of Tour de France, one of cycling's Grand Tours. The Tour began in Frankfurt with a prologue individual time trial on 26 June and Stage 11 occurred on 8 July with another individual time trial from Damazan. The race finished on the Champs-Élysées in Paris on 20 July.

== Stage 11 ==
8 July 1980 — Damazan to Laplume, 51 km (31.7 mi) (individual time trial)

Stage 11 result

Rank	Rider	Team	Time
1	Joop Zoetemelk (NED)	TI–Raleigh–Creda	1h 10' 24"
2	Hennie Kuiper (NED)	Peugeot–Esso–Michelin	+ 46"
3	Joaquim Agostinho (POR)	Puch–Sem–Campagnolo	+ 1' 09"
4	Bert Oosterbosch (NED)	TI–Raleigh–Creda	+ 1' 12"
5	Bernard Hinault (FRA)	Renault–Gitane–Campagnolo	+ 1' 39"
6	Johan De Muynck (BEL)	Splendor–Admiral–TV Ekspres	+ 1' 44"
7	Gerrie Knetemann (NED)	TI–Raleigh–Creda	+ 1' 56"
8	Patrick Perret (FRA)	Peugeot–Esso–Michelin	+ 1' 58"
9	Gilbert Duclos-Lassalle (FRA)	Peugeot–Esso–Michelin	+ 1' 59"
10	Jean Chassang (FRA)	Renault–Gitane–Campagnolo	+ 2' 04"

General classification after stage 11

Rank	Rider	Team	Time
1	Bernard Hinault (FRA)	Renault–Gitane–Campagnolo	52h 02' 05"
2	Joop Zoetemelk (NED)	TI–Raleigh–Creda	+ 21"
3	Rudy Pevenage (BEL)	IJsboerke–Warncke Eis–Koga Miyata	+ 1' 29"
4	Hennie Kuiper (NED)	Peugeot–Esso–Michelin	+ 1' 31"
5	Pierre Bazzo (FRA)	La Redoute–Motobécane	+ 2' 40"
6	Henk Lubberding (NED)	TI–Raleigh–Creda	+ 5' 03"
7	Ronny Claes (BEL)	IJsboerke–Warncke Eis–Koga Miyata	+ 5' 24"
8	Johan van der Velde (NED)	TI–Raleigh–Creda	+ 6' 03"
9	Patrick Bonnet (FRA)	Renault–Gitane–Campagnolo	+ 6' 13"
10	Patrick Perret (FRA)	Peugeot–Esso–Michelin	+ 6' 27"

== Stage 12 ==
9 July 1980 — Agen to Pau, 193.5 km (120.2 mi)

Stage 12 result

Rank	Rider	Team	Time
1	Gerrie Knetemann (NED)	TI–Raleigh–Creda	5h 45' 24"
2	Ludo Peeters (BEL)	IJsboerke–Warncke Eis–Koga Miyata	s.t.
3	Jean-Luc Vandenbroucke (BEL)	La Redoute–Motobécane	+ 1' 19"
4	Leo van Vliet (NED)	TI–Raleigh–Creda	+ 1' 25"
5	Jos Jacobs (BEL)	IJsboerke–Warncke Eis–Koga Miyata	s.t.
6	Ludo Delcroix (BEL)	IJsboerke–Warncke Eis–Koga Miyata	s.t.
7	Jan Raas (NED)	TI–Raleigh–Creda	s.t.
8	Sean Kelly (IRL)	Splendor–Admiral–TV Ekspres	s.t.
9	Yvon Bertin (FRA)	Renault–Gitane–Campagnolo	s.t.
10	William Tackaert (BEL)	Daf Trucks–Lejeune–PZ	s.t.

General classification after stage 12

Rank	Rider	Team	Time
1	Bernard Hinault (FRA)	Renault–Gitane–Campagnolo	57h 48' 54"
2	Joop Zoetemelk (NED)	TI–Raleigh–Creda	+ 21"
3	Rudy Pevenage (BEL)	IJsboerke–Warncke Eis–Koga Miyata	+ 1' 29"
4	Hennie Kuiper (NED)	Peugeot–Esso–Michelin	+ 1' 31"
5	Pierre Bazzo (FRA)	La Redoute–Motobécane	+ 2' 40"
6	Henk Lubberding (NED)	TI–Raleigh–Creda	+ 5' 03"
7	Ronny Claes (BEL)	IJsboerke–Warncke Eis–Koga Miyata	+ 5' 24"
8	Johan van der Velde (NED)	TI–Raleigh–Creda	+ 6' 03"
9	Patrick Bonnet (FRA)	Renault–Gitane–Campagnolo	+ 6' 13"
10	Patrick Perret (FRA)	Peugeot–Esso–Michelin	+ 6' 27"

== Stage 13 ==
10 July 1980 — Pau to Bagnères-de-Luchon, 198 km (123.0 mi)

Stage 13 result

Rank	Rider	Team	Time
1	Raymond Martin (FRA)	Miko–Mercier–Vivagel	6h 27' 32"
2	Sven-Åke Nilsson (SWE)	Miko–Mercier–Vivagel	+ 3' 13"
3	Christian Seznec (FRA)	Miko–Mercier–Vivagel	+ 3' 27"
4	Robert Alban (FRA)	La Redoute–Motobécane	s.t.
5	Joop Zoetemelk (NED)	TI–Raleigh–Creda	s.t.
6	Jostein Wilmann (NOR)	Puch–Sem–Campagnolo	s.t.
7	Joaquim Agostinho (POR)	Puch–Sem–Campagnolo	s.t.
8	Johan De Muynck (BEL)	Splendor–Admiral–TV Ekspres	s.t.
9	Jean-René Bernaudeau (FRA)	Renault–Gitane–Campagnolo	s.t.
10	Hennie Kuiper (NED)	Peugeot–Esso–Michelin	s.t.

General classification after stage 13

Rank	Rider	Team	Time
1	Joop Zoetemelk (NED)	TI–Raleigh–Creda	64h 20' 14"
2	Hennie Kuiper (NED)	Peugeot–Esso–Michelin	+ 1' 10"
3	Raymond Martin (FRA)	Miko–Mercier–Vivagel	+ 4' 37"
4	Johan De Muynck (BEL)	Splendor–Admiral–TV Ekspres	+ 6' 53"
5	Pierre Bazzo (FRA)	La Redoute–Motobécane	+ 7' 10"
6	Jean-René Bernaudeau (FRA)	Renault–Gitane–Campagnolo	+ 7' 57"
7	Henk Lubberding (NED)	TI–Raleigh–Creda	+ 8' 59"
8	Joaquim Agostinho (POR)	Puch–Sem–Campagnolo	+ 9' 44"
9	Christian Seznec (FRA)	Miko–Mercier–Vivagel	+ 9' 52"
10	Sven-Åke Nilsson (SWE)	Miko–Mercier–Vivagel	+ 9' 53"

== Stage 14 ==
11 July 1980 — Lézignan-Corbières to Montpellier, 189.5 km (117.7 mi)

Stage 14 result

Rank	Rider	Team	Time
1	Ludo Peeters (BEL)	Miko–Mercier–Vivagel	5h 34' 49"
2	Leo van Vliet (NED)	TI–Raleigh–Creda	+ 1' 34"
3	Patrick Bonnet (FRA)	Renault–Gitane–Campagnolo	s.t.
4	Klaus-Peter Thaler (FRG)	Teka	s.t.
5	Jos Jacobs (BEL)	IJsboerke–Warncke Eis–Koga Miyata	s.t.
6	Régis Ovion (FRA)	Puch–Sem–Campagnolo	s.t.
7	Johan van der Velde (NED)	TI–Raleigh–Creda	s.t.
8	Rudy Pevenage (BEL)	IJsboerke–Warncke Eis–Koga Miyata	s.t.
9	Mariano Martínez (FRA)	La Redoute–Motobécane	s.t.
10	Ludwig Wijnants (BEL)	IJsboerke–Warncke Eis–Koga Miyata	s.t.

General classification after stage 14

Rank	Rider	Team	Time
1	Joop Zoetemelk (NED)	TI–Raleigh–Creda	69h 56' 29"
2	Hennie Kuiper (NED)	Peugeot–Esso–Michelin	+ 1' 18"
3	Raymond Martin (FRA)	Miko–Mercier–Vivagel	+ 4' 55"
4	Johan De Muynck (BEL)	Splendor–Admiral–TV Ekspres	+ 7' 01"
5	Pierre Bazzo (FRA)	La Redoute–Motobécane	+ 7' 20"
6	Jean-René Bernaudeau (FRA)	Renault–Gitane–Campagnolo	+ 8' 05"
7	Henk Lubberding (NED)	TI–Raleigh–Creda	+ 8' 59"
8	Joaquim Agostinho (POR)	Puch–Sem–Campagnolo	+ 9' 52"
9	Christian Seznec (FRA)	Miko–Mercier–Vivagel	+ 10' 00"
10	Sven-Åke Nilsson (SWE)	Miko–Mercier–Vivagel	+ 10' 01"

== Stage 15 ==
12 July 1980 — Montpellier to Martigues, 158 km (98 mi)

Stage 15 result

Rank	Rider	Team	Time
1	Bernard Vallet (FRA)	La Redoute–Motobécane	3h 57' 43"
2	Bernard Thévenet (FRA)	Teka	+ 4"
3	Jean-Raymond Toso (FRA)	Puch–Sem–Campagnolo	+ 7"
4	Sean Kelly (IRL)	Splendor–Admiral–TV Ekspres	+ 9"
5	Klaus-Peter Thaler (FRG)	Teka	s.t.
6	Rudy Pevenage (BEL)	IJsboerke–Warncke Eis–Koga Miyata	s.t.
7	Christian Seznec (FRA)	Miko–Mercier–Vivagel	s.t.
8	Jean-René Bernaudeau (FRA)	Renault–Gitane–Campagnolo	s.t.
9	Joop Zoetemelk (NED)	TI–Raleigh–Creda	s.t.
10	Johan van der Velde (NED)	TI–Raleigh–Creda	s.t.

General classification after stage 15

Rank	Rider	Team	Time
1	Joop Zoetemelk (NED)	TI–Raleigh–Creda	73h 54' 21"
2	Hennie Kuiper (NED)	Peugeot–Esso–Michelin	+ 1' 18"
3	Raymond Martin (FRA)	Miko–Mercier–Vivagel	+ 4' 55"
4	Johan De Muynck (BEL)	Splendor–Admiral–TV Ekspres	+ 7' 01"
5	Pierre Bazzo (FRA)	La Redoute–Motobécane	+ 7' 20"
6	Jean-René Bernaudeau (FRA)	Renault–Gitane–Campagnolo	+ 8' 05"
7	Henk Lubberding (NED)	TI–Raleigh–Creda	+ 8' 59"
8	Joaquim Agostinho (POR)	Puch–Sem–Campagnolo	+ 9' 52"
9	Christian Seznec (FRA)	Miko–Mercier–Vivagel	+ 10' 00"
10	Sven-Åke Nilsson (SWE)	Miko–Mercier–Vivagel	+ 10' 01"

== Stage 16 ==
13 July 1980 — Trets to Pra-Loup, 207.5 km (128.9 mi)

Stage 16 result

Rank	Rider	Team	Time
1	Jos Deschoenmaecker (BEL)	Marc–IWC–VRD	6h 25' 31"
2	Alberto Fernández de la Puebla (ESP)	Teka	+ 2"
3	Christian Seznec (FRA)	Miko–Mercier–Vivagel	+ 1' 30"
4	Ludo Peeters (BEL)	IJsboerke–Warncke Eis–Koga Miyata	s.t.
5	Robert Alban (FRA)	La Redoute–Motobécane	s.t.
6	Ismael Lejarreta (ESP)	Teka	s.t.
7	Sven-Åke Nilsson (SWE)	Miko–Mercier–Vivagel	s.t.
8	Jean-René Bernaudeau (FRA)	Renault–Gitane–Campagnolo	s.t.
9	Joop Zoetemelk (NED)	TI–Raleigh–Creda	s.t.
10	Raymond Martin (FRA)	Miko–Mercier–Vivagel	s.t.

General classification after stage 16

Rank	Rider	Team	Time
1	Joop Zoetemelk (NED)	TI–Raleigh–Creda	80h 21' 22"
2	Hennie Kuiper (NED)	Peugeot–Esso–Michelin	+ 1' 34"
3	Raymond Martin (FRA)	Miko–Mercier–Vivagel	+ 4' 55"
4	Johan De Muynck (BEL)	Splendor–Admiral–TV Ekspres	+ 7' 01"
5	Jean-René Bernaudeau (FRA)	Renault–Gitane–Campagnolo	+ 8' 05"
6	Pierre Bazzo (FRA)	La Redoute–Motobécane	+ 9' 11"
7	Christian Seznec (FRA)	Miko–Mercier–Vivagel	+ 10' 00"
8	Sven-Åke Nilsson (SWE)	Miko–Mercier–Vivagel	+ 10' 01"
9	Joaquim Agostinho (POR)	Puch–Sem–Campagnolo	+ 10' 13"
10	Henk Lubberding (NED)	TI–Raleigh–Creda	+ 10' 46"

== Stage 17 ==
14 July 1980 — Serre Chevalier to Morzine, 244.5 km (151.9 mi)

Stage 17 result

Rank	Rider	Team	Time
1	Mariano Martínez (FRA)	La Redoute–Motobécane	7h 09' 07"
2	Christian Levavasseur (FRA)	Miko–Mercier–Vivagel	+ 2' 16"
3	Lucien Van Impe (BEL)	Marc–IWC–VRD	+ 2' 34"
4	Ludo Peeters (BEL)	IJsboerke–Warncke Eis–Koga Miyata	+ 2' 45"
5	Robert Alban (FRA)	La Redoute–Motobécane	+ 2' 48"
6	Vicente Belda (ESP)	Kelme	+ 2' 59"
7	Bernard Thévenet (FRA)	Teka	+ 3' 00"
8	Raymond Martin (FRA)	Miko–Mercier–Vivagel	s.t.
9	Sven-Åke Nilsson (SWE)	Miko–Mercier–Vivagel	+ 3' 15"
10	Jostein Wilmann (NOR)	Puch–Sem–Campagnolo	s.t.

General classification after stage 17

Rank	Rider	Team	Time
1	Joop Zoetemelk (NED)	TI–Raleigh–Creda	87h 33' 44"
2	Hennie Kuiper (NED)	Peugeot–Esso–Michelin	+ 3' 05"
3	Raymond Martin (FRA)	Miko–Mercier–Vivagel	+ 4' 40"
4	Johan De Muynck (BEL)	Splendor–Admiral–TV Ekspres	+ 7' 01"
5	Christian Seznec (FRA)	Miko–Mercier–Vivagel	+ 10' 00"
6	Sven-Åke Nilsson (SWE)	Miko–Mercier–Vivagel	+ 10' 01"
7	Jean-René Bernaudeau (FRA)	Renault–Gitane–Campagnolo	+ 10' 33"
8	Henk Lubberding (NED)	TI–Raleigh–Creda	+ 12' 17"
9	Pierre Bazzo (FRA)	La Redoute–Motobécane	+ 12' 47"
10	Joaquim Agostinho (POR)	Puch–Sem–Campagnolo	+ 14' 19"

== Stage 18 ==
16 July 1980 — Morzine to Prapoutel Les sept Laux, 196 km (122 mi)

Stage 18 result

Rank	Rider	Team	Time
1	Ludo Loos (BEL)	Marc–IWC–VRD	5h 52' 46"
2	Robert Alban (FRA)	La Redoute–Motobécane	+ 5' 19"
3	Joaquim Agostinho (POR)	Puch–Sem–Campagnolo	+ 5' 20"
4	Lucien Van Impe (BEL)	Marc–IWC–VRD	+ 5' 21"
5	Joop Zoetemelk (NED)	TI–Raleigh–Creda	s.t.
6	Jostein Wilmann (NOR)	Puch–Sem–Campagnolo	+ 5' 25"
7	Johan van der Velde (NED)	TI–Raleigh–Creda	+ 5' 36"
8	Raymond Martin (FRA)	Miko–Mercier–Vivagel	+ 6' 03"
9	Johan De Muynck (BEL)	Splendor–Admiral–TV Ekspres	+ 6' 47"
10	Ludo Peeters (BEL)	IJsboerke–Warncke Eis–Koga Miyata	s.t.

General classification after stage 18

Rank	Rider	Team	Time
1	Joop Zoetemelk (NED)	TI–Raleigh–Creda	93h 31' 51"
2	Raymond Martin (FRA)	Miko–Mercier–Vivagel	+ 5' 22"
3	Hennie Kuiper (NED)	Peugeot–Esso–Michelin	+ 5' 39"
4	Johan De Muynck (BEL)	Splendor–Admiral–TV Ekspres	+ 8' 27"
5	Sven-Åke Nilsson (SWE)	Miko–Mercier–Vivagel	+ 13' 15"
6	Christian Seznec (FRA)	Miko–Mercier–Vivagel	+ 13' 57"
7	Joaquim Agostinho (POR)	Puch–Sem–Campagnolo	+ 14' 18"
8	Pierre Bazzo (FRA)	La Redoute–Motobécane	+ 17' 57"
9	Henk Lubberding (NED)	TI–Raleigh–Creda	+ 18' 10"
10	Ludo Peeters (BEL)	IJsboerke–Warncke Eis–Koga Miyata	+ 18' 34"

== Stage 19 ==
17 July 1980 — Voreppe to Saint-Étienne, 136.5 km (84.8 mi)

Stage 19 result

Rank	Rider	Team	Time
1	Sean Kelly (IRL)	Splendor–Admiral–TV Ekspres	4h 00' 33"
2	Ismael Lejarreta (ESP)	Teka	s.t.
3	Jos Jacobs (BEL)	IJsboerke–Warncke Eis–Koga Miyata	+ 20"
4	Guido Van Calster (FRA)	Splendor–Admiral–TV Ekspres	s.t.
5	Leo van Vliet (NED)	TI–Raleigh–Creda	s.t.
6	Didier Vanoverschelde (FRA)	La Redoute–Motobécane	s.t.
7	Johan van der Velde (NED)	TI–Raleigh–Creda	s.t.
8	Régis Ovion (FRA)	Puch–Sem–Campagnolo	s.t.
9	Bert Oosterbosch (NED)	TI–Raleigh–Creda	s.t.
10	Christian Seznec (FRA)	Miko–Mercier–Vivagel	s.t.

General classification after stage 19

Rank	Rider	Team	Time
1	Joop Zoetemelk (NED)	TI–Raleigh–Creda	97h 32' 44"
2	Raymond Martin (FRA)	Miko–Mercier–Vivagel	+ 5' 22"
3	Hennie Kuiper (NED)	Peugeot–Esso–Michelin	+ 5' 35"
4	Johan De Muynck (BEL)	Splendor–Admiral–TV Ekspres	+ 8' 27"
5	Sven-Åke Nilsson (SWE)	Miko–Mercier–Vivagel	+ 13' 35"
6	Christian Seznec (FRA)	Miko–Mercier–Vivagel	+ 13' 57"
7	Joaquim Agostinho (POR)	Puch–Sem–Campagnolo	+ 14' 18"
8	Pierre Bazzo (FRA)	La Redoute–Motobécane	+ 17' 57"
9	Henk Lubberding (NED)	TI–Raleigh–Creda	+ 18' 10"
10	Ludo Peeters (BEL)	IJsboerke–Warncke Eis–Koga Miyata	+ 18' 34"

== Stage 20 ==
18 July 1980 — Saint-Étienne to Saint-Étienne, 34.5 km (21.4 mi) (individual time trial)

Stage 20 result

Rank	Rider	Team	Time
1	Joop Zoetemelk (NED)	TI–Raleigh–Creda	45' 38"
2	Gerrie Knetemann (NED)	TI–Raleigh–Creda	+ 46"
3	Joaquim Agostinho (POR)	Puch–Sem–Campagnolo	+ 1' 11"
4	Hennie Kuiper (NED)	Peugeot–Esso–Michelin	+ 1' 12"
5	Jean-Luc Vandenbroucke (BEL)	La Redoute–Motobécane	+ 1' 37"
6	Bert Oosterbosch (NED)	TI–Raleigh–Creda	s.t.
7	Bernard Thévenet (FRA)	Teka	+ 2' 03"
8	Christian Seznec (FRA)	Miko–Mercier–Vivagel	+ 2' 11"
9	Ludo Peeters (BEL)	IJsboerke–Warncke Eis–Koga Miyata	+ 2' 19"
10	Jo Maas (NED)	Daf Trucks–Lejeune–PZ	+ 2' 21"

General classification after stage 20

Rank	Rider	Team	Time
1	Joop Zoetemelk (NED)	TI–Raleigh–Creda	98h 18' 22"
2	Hennie Kuiper (NED)	Peugeot–Esso–Michelin	+ 6' 47"
3	Raymond Martin (FRA)	Miko–Mercier–Vivagel	+ 7' 48"
4	Johan De Muynck (BEL)	Splendor–Admiral–TV Ekspres	+ 12' 16"
5	Joaquim Agostinho (POR)	Puch–Sem–Campagnolo	+ 15' 29"
6	Christian Seznec (FRA)	Miko–Mercier–Vivagel	+ 16' 08"
7	Sven-Åke Nilsson (SWE)	Miko–Mercier–Vivagel	+ 16' 25"
8	Ludo Peeters (BEL)	IJsboerke–Warncke Eis–Koga Miyata	+ 20' 53"
9	Pierre Bazzo (FRA)	La Redoute–Motobécane	+ 20' 59"
10	Henk Lubberding (NED)	TI–Raleigh–Creda	+ 21' 02"

== Stage 21 ==
19 July 1980 — Auxerre to Fontenay-sous-Bois, 207 km (129 mi)

Stage 21 result

Rank	Rider	Team	Time
1	Sean Kelly (IRL)	Splendor–Admiral–TV Ekspres	5h 48' 33"
2	Jos Jacobs (BEL)	IJsboerke–Warncke Eis–Koga Miyata	s.t.
3	Klaus-Peter Thaler (FRG)	Teka	s.t.
4	Leo van Vliet (NED)	TI–Raleigh–Creda	s.t.
5	Rudy Pevenage (BEL)	IJsboerke–Warncke Eis–Koga Miyata	s.t.
6	Patrick Bonnet (FRA)	Renault–Gitane–Campagnolo	s.t.
7	Ludo Peeters (BEL)	IJsboerke–Warncke Eis–Koga Miyata	s.t.
8	Johan van der Velde (NED)	TI–Raleigh–Creda	s.t.
9	Régis Ovion (FRA)	Puch–Sem–Campagnolo	s.t.
10	Didier Vanoverschelde (FRA)	La Redoute–Motobécane	s.t.

General classification after stage 21

Rank	Rider	Team	Time
1	Joop Zoetemelk (NED)	TI–Raleigh–Creda	104h 06' 47"
2	Hennie Kuiper (NED)	Peugeot–Esso–Michelin	+ 6' 55"
3	Raymond Martin (FRA)	Miko–Mercier–Vivagel	+ 7' 56"
4	Johan De Muynck (BEL)	Splendor–Admiral–TV Ekspres	+ 12' 24"
5	Joaquim Agostinho (POR)	Puch–Sem–Campagnolo	+ 15' 37"
6	Christian Seznec (FRA)	Miko–Mercier–Vivagel	+ 16' 16"
7	Sven-Åke Nilsson (SWE)	Miko–Mercier–Vivagel	+ 16' 33"
8	Ludo Peeters (BEL)	IJsboerke–Warncke Eis–Koga Miyata	+ 20' 41"
9	Pierre Bazzo (FRA)	La Redoute–Motobécane	+ 21' 03"
10	Henk Lubberding (NED)	TI–Raleigh–Creda	+ 21' 10"

== Stage 22 ==
20 July 1980 — Fontenay-sous-Bois to Paris Champs-Élysées, 183.3 km (113.9 mi)

Stage 22 result

Rank	Rider	Team	Time
1	Pol Verschuere (BEL)	IJsboerke–Warncke Eis–Koga Miyata	5h 12' 27"
2	Sean Kelly (IRL)	Splendor–Admiral–TV Ekspres	s.t.
3	Jos Jacobs (BEL)	IJsboerke–Warncke Eis–Koga Miyata	s.t.
4	Leo van Vliet (NED)	TI–Raleigh–Creda	s.t.
5	Johan van der Velde (NED)	TI–Raleigh–Creda	s.t.
6	Klaus-Peter Thaler (FRG)	Teka	s.t.
7	Rudy Pevenage (BEL)	IJsboerke–Warncke Eis–Koga Miyata	s.t.
8	Régis Ovion (FRA)	Puch–Sem–Campagnolo	s.t.
9	Jean-Luc Vandenbroucke (BEL)	La Redoute–Motobécane	s.t.
10	Gerhard Schönbacher (AUT)	Marc–IWC–VRD	s.t.

General classification after stage 22

Rank	Rider	Team	Time
1	Joop Zoetemelk (NED)	TI–Raleigh–Creda	109h 19' 14"
2	Hennie Kuiper (NED)	Peugeot–Esso–Michelin	+ 6' 55"
3	Raymond Martin (FRA)	Miko–Mercier–Vivagel	+ 7' 56"
4	Johan De Muynck (BEL)	Splendor–Admiral–TV Ekspres	+ 12' 24"
5	Joaquim Agostinho (POR)	Puch–Sem–Campagnolo	+ 15' 37"
6	Christian Seznec (FRA)	Miko–Mercier–Vivagel	+ 16' 16"
7	Sven-Åke Nilsson (SWE)	Miko–Mercier–Vivagel	+ 16' 33"
8	Ludo Peeters (BEL)	IJsboerke–Warncke Eis–Koga Miyata	+ 20' 45"
9	Pierre Bazzo (FRA)	La Redoute–Motobécane	+ 21' 03"
10	Henk Lubberding (NED)	TI–Raleigh–Creda	+ 21' 10"
