= Col de la Colombière =

Mountain pass in the French Alps

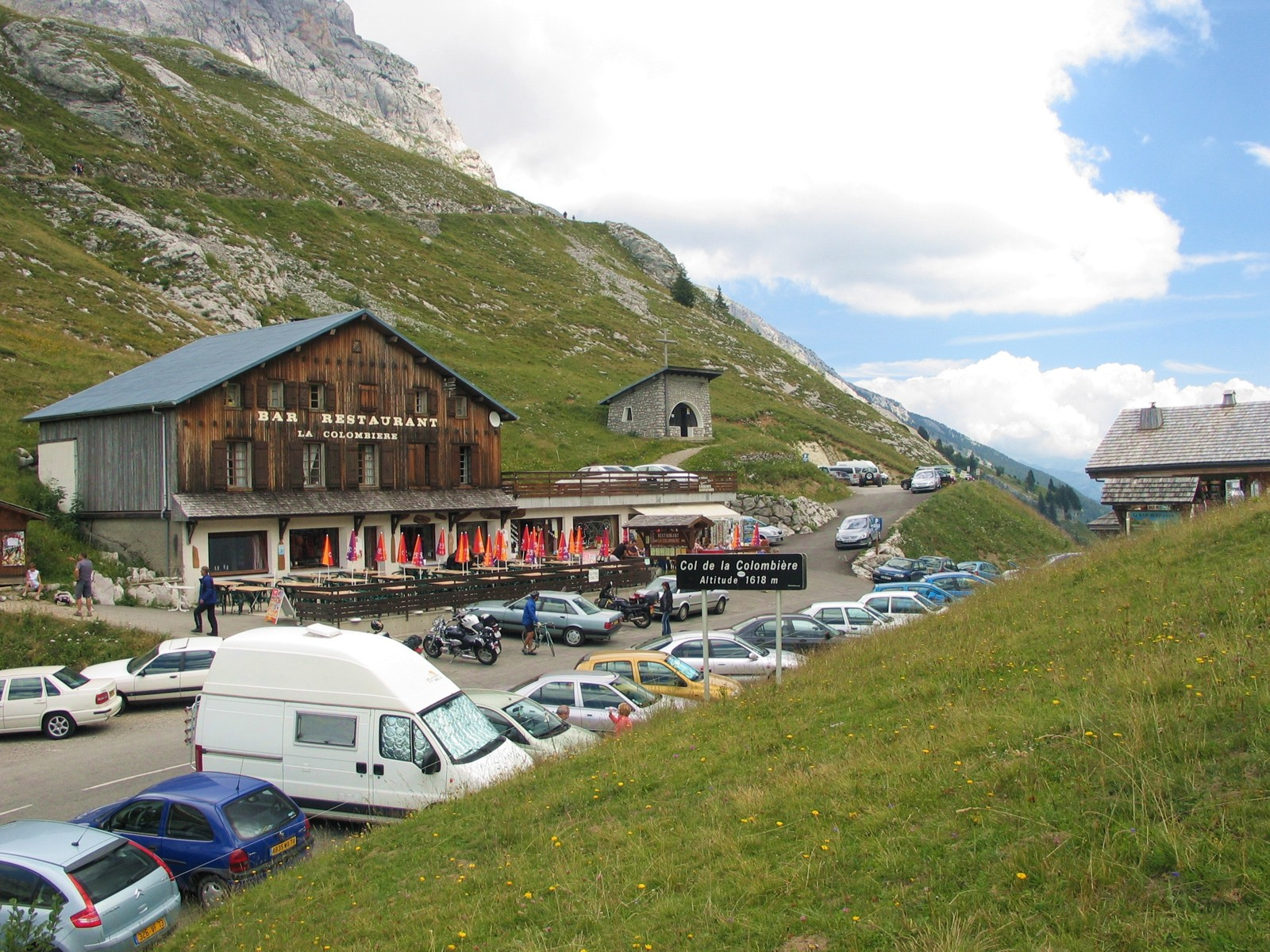
- Col de la Colombière

- Location within Alps
- Elevation: 1,613 m (5,292 ft)
- Traversed by: D4

Third Approach
- Location: Haute-Savoie, France
- Range: Alps
- Coordinates: 45°59′32″N 06°28′33″E

Col de la Colombière (French pronunciation: [kɔl də la kɔlɔ̃bjɛʁ]) (elevation 1613 m) is a mountain pass in the Alps in the department of Haute-Savoie in France.

It connects Cluses in the Arve valley with Le Grand-Bornand in the Bourne valley. The road then leads further to Annecy or over Col des Aravis to the Arly valley and is situated between the Massif des Bornes to the north-west and the Chaîne des Aravis to the south-east.

The pass is not an important traffic route because there are better roads that parallel it, particularly the A40 autoroute.

== Details of climb ==
Although the pass is not very high, it is technically difficult for cyclists.

Starting from Scionzier, the climb is 16.3 km long. Over this distance, the climb is 1108 m (an average percentage of 6.8%). The steepest section is 10.2% near the summit. From Le Grand-Bornand, the Col de la Colombière is 11.7 km long. Over this distance, the climb is 690 m (an average percentage of 5.9%).

On 31 May 2015, U.S. Secretary of State John Kerry broke his leg near the start of the climb in Scionzier.

== Appearances in Tour de France ==
The pass was first included in the Tour de France in 1960 and has since featured 23 times, most recently in 2021.

Year	Stage	Category	Start	Finish	Leader at the summit
2021	8	1	Oyonnax	Le Grand-Bornand	Dylan Teuns (BEL)
2018	10	1	Annecy	Le Grand-Bornand	Julian Alaphilippe (FRA)
2016	20	1	Megève	Morzine	Thomas De Gendt (BEL)
2010	9	1	Morzine-Avoriaz	Saint-Jean-de-Maurienne	Christophe Moreau (FRA)
2009	17	1	Bourg-Saint-Maurice	Le Grand-Bornand	Fränk Schleck (LUX)
2007	7	1	Bourg-en-Bresse	Le Grand-Bornand	Linus Gerdemann (GER)
2006	17	1	Saint-Jean-de-Maurienne	Morzine	~~Floyd Landis (USA)~~ (Note: Landis was disqualified from the 2006 Tour de France as a result of a urine sample on stage 17 that was positive for banned synthetic testosterone as well as a ratio of testosterone to epitestosterone nearly three times the limit allowed by World Anti-Doping Agency rules.)
2002	17	1	Aime	Cluses	Mario Aerts (BEL)
2000	16	1	Courchevel	Morzine	Marco Pantani (ITA)
1997	15	1	Courchevel	Morzine	Richard Virenque (FRA)
1994	18	1	Moûtiers	Cluses	Piotr Ugrumov (LAT)
1991	18	1	Bourg-d'Oisans	Morzine	Thierry Claveyrolat (FRA)
1990	10	1	Genève	Saint-Gervais Mont-Blanc	Thierry Claveyrolat (FRA)
1987	22	1	La Plagne	Morzine	Eduardo Chozas (ESP)
1985	12	1	Morzine	Lans-en-Vercors	Luis Herrera (COL)
1984	19	1	La Plagne	Morzine	Jérôme Simon (FRA)
1983	18	1	Alpe d'Huez	Morzine	Jacques Michaud (FRA)
1982	17	1	Alpe d'Huez	Morzine	Jean-René Bernaudeau (FRA)
1980	18	1	Morzine	Prapoutel Les sept Laux	Ludo Loos (BEL)
1978	17	1	Grenoble	Morzine	René Bittinger (FRA)
1975	17	2	Valloire	Morzine-Avoriaz	Vicente López Carril (ESP)
1968	19	2	Grenoble	Sallanches Cordon	Barry Hoban (GBR)
1960	18	2	Aix-les-bains	Thonon-les-Bains	Fernando Manzaneque (ESP)

== See also ==
- List of highest paved roads in Europe
- List of mountain passes
