= Col des Aravis =

Mountain pass in the French Alps

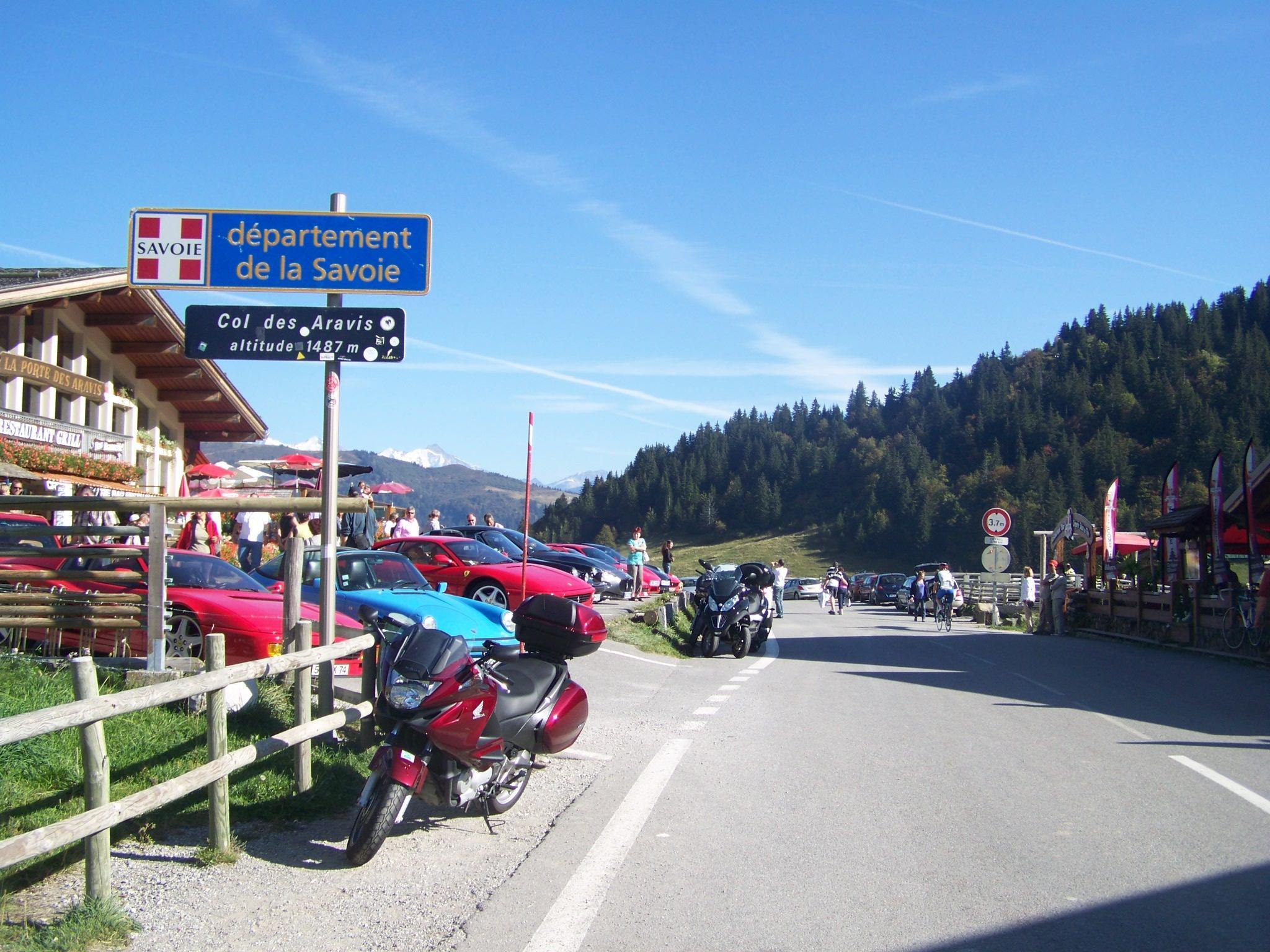

- Location within Alps
- Elevation: 1,487 m (4,879 ft)

Third Approach
- Location: Haute-Savoie/Savoie, France
- Range: Aravis Range
- Coordinates: 45°52′21″N 6°27′53″E

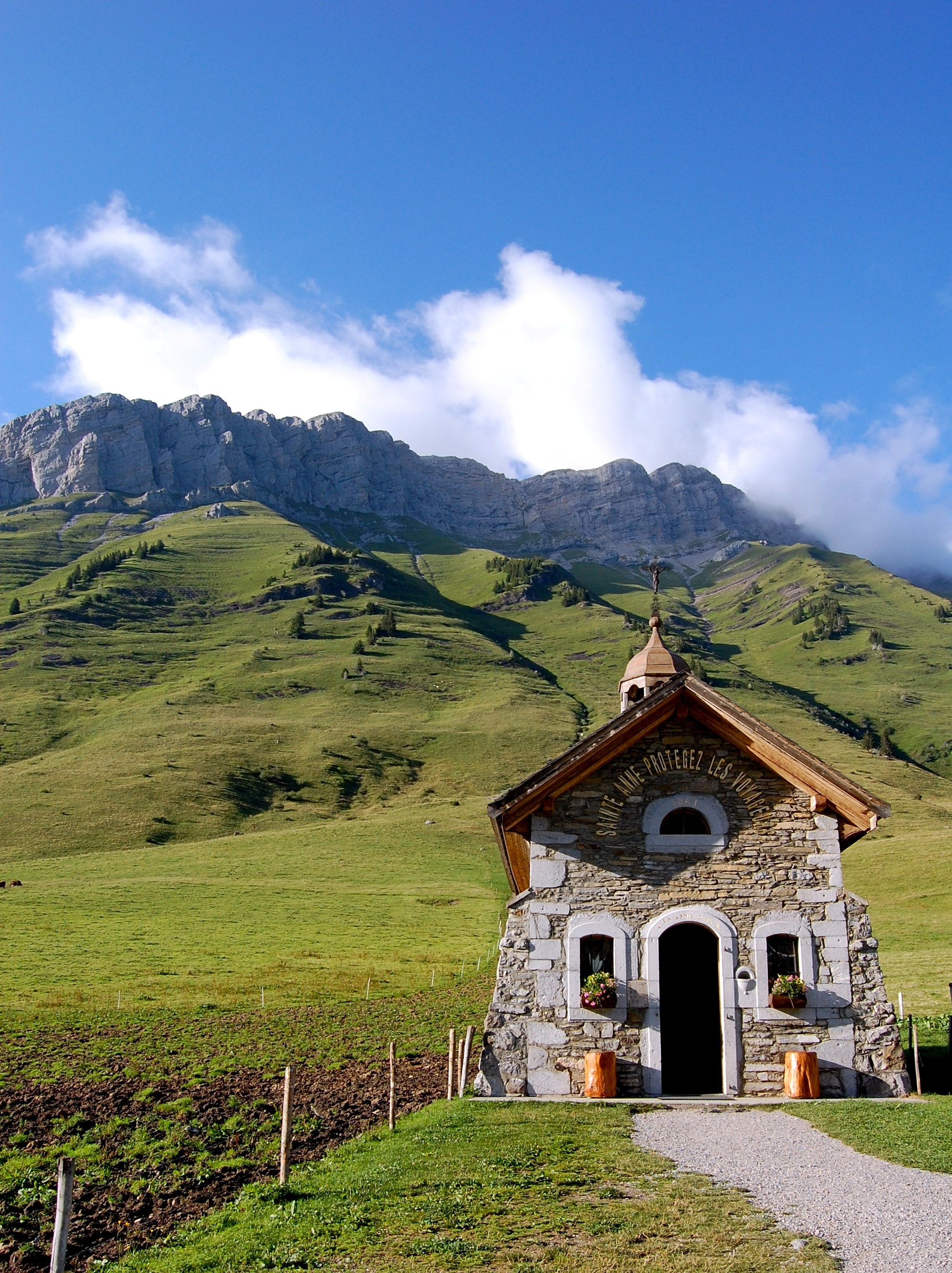
Col des Aravis

The Col des Aravis is a mountain pass in the French Alps that connects the towns of La Clusaz in Haute-Savoie with La Giettaz in Savoie. At 1487 m it is the lowest pass in the Aravis Range of mountains.

== Climb Details ==
Starting from Flumet, the climb is 11.7 km long with an average gradient of 4.9%.

Starting from Thones, the climb is 18.9 km long with an average gradient of 4.6%.

== Appearances in Tour de France (Since 1947) ==
The pass has been used 41 times in the Tour de France, most recently in 2020. In 1948 Gino Bartali was the first rider over the pass.

Year	Stage	Category	Start	Finish	Leader at the summit
2020	18	2	Méribel	La Roche-sur-Foron	Richard Carapaz (ECU)
2016	20	2	Megève	Morzine	Thomas De Gendt (BEL)
2010	9	2	Morzine-Avoriaz	Saint-Jean-de-Maurienne	Jérôme Pineau (FRA)
2006	17	2	Saint-Jean-de-Maurienne	Morzine	Patrice Halgand (FRA)
2002	17	2	Aime	Cluses	Mario Aerts (BEL)
2000	16	2	Courchevel	Morzine	Marco Pantani (ITA)
1991	18	1	Bourg-d'Oisans	Morzine	Thierry Claveyrolat (FRA)
1990	10	2	Genève	Saint-Gervais Mont Blanc	Thierry Claveyrolat (FRA)
1987	22	2	La Plagne	Morzine	Eduardo Chozas (ESP)
1984	19	2	La Plagne	Morzine	Robert Millar (GBR)
1983	18	2	Bourg-d'Oisans	Morzine	Jacques Michaud (FRA)
1982	17	2	Bourg-d'Oisans	Morzine	Marino Lejarreta (ESP)
1980	18	2	Morzine	Prapoutel Les sept Laux	Ludo Loos (BEL)
1975	17	3	Valloire	Morzine-Avoriaz	Lucien van Impe (BEL)
1968	19	2	Grenoble	Sallanches Cordon	Barry Hoban (GBR)
1960	18	2	Aix-les-Bains	Thonon-les-Bains	Fernando Manzanèque (ESP)
1955	8	2	Thonon-les-Bains	Briançon	Charly Gaul (LUX)
1948	15	2	Aix-les-Bains	Lausanne	Gino Bartali (ITA)

== See also ==
- List of highest paved roads in Europe
- List of mountain passes
- Souvenir Henri Desgrange
