= Jesús Guzmán =

Jesús Guzmán may refer to:

- Jesús Guzmán (actor) (1926–2023), Spanish actor
- Jesús Guzmán (baseball) (born 1984), Venezuelan baseball player
- Jesús Guzmán Delgado (born 1957), Spanish cyclist
