= Paul De Keyser =

Belgian cyclist

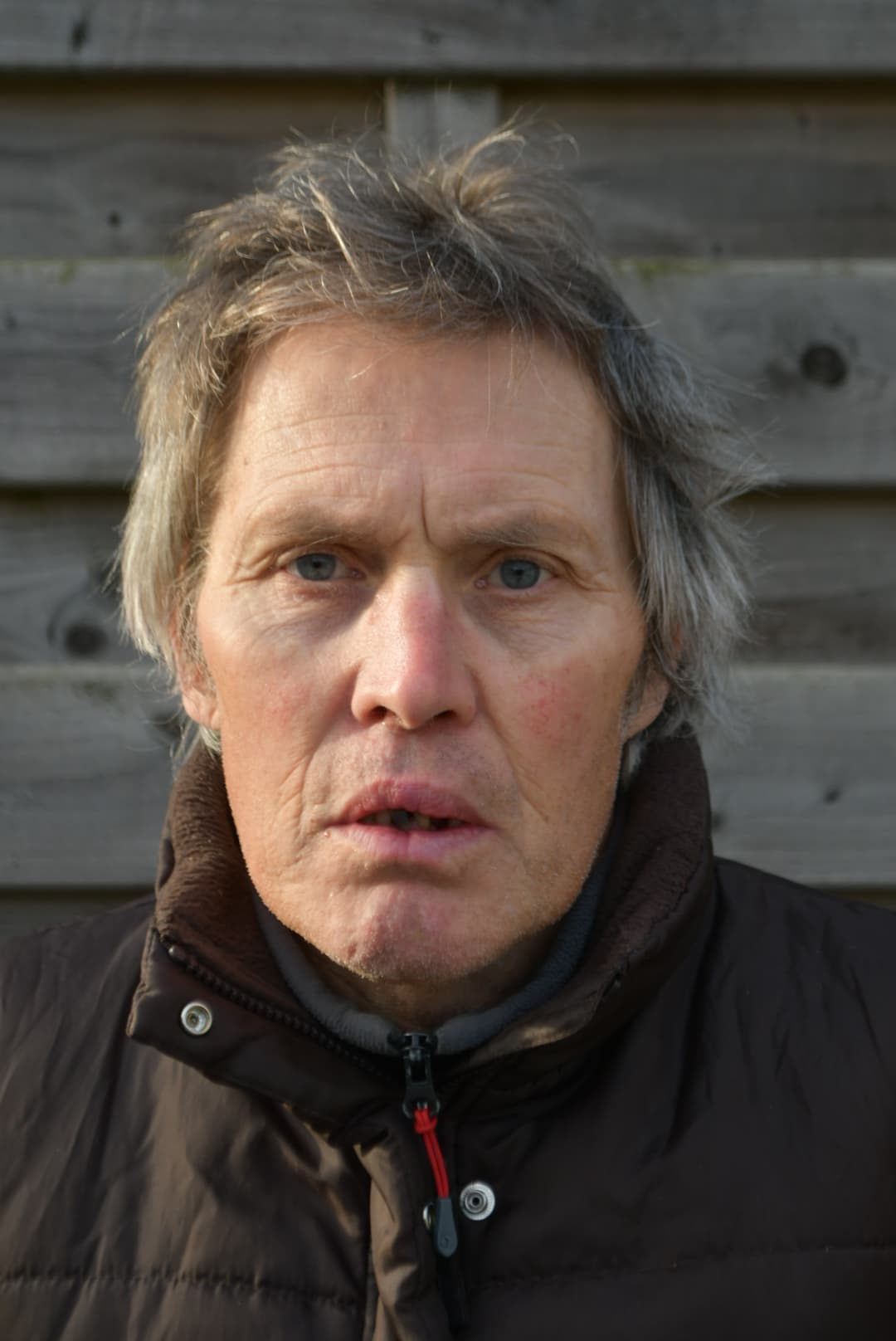

Personal information
- Full name: Paul De Keyser
- Born: 7 February 1957 (age 69) Aarschot, Belgium

Cycling career
- Sport: Cycling
- Role: Rider

Professional teams
- 1979: Mini Flat
- 1980-1981: Boston Mavic

Major wins
- 1976 tour of flanders with the amateurs (u23)

Paul De Keyser (born 7 February 1957) is a former Belgian racing cyclist. He rode in the 1980 Tour de France.
