= 1980 Tour du Haut Var =

Race details
- Dates: 24 February 1980
- Stages: 1
- Distance: 185 km (115.0 mi)
- Winning time: 5h 07' 25"

Results
| | Winner | Pascal Simon (FRA) |
| | Second | Sean Kelly (IRL) |
| | Third | Guy Sibille (FRA) |

The 1980 Tour du Haut Var was the 12th edition of the Tour du Haut Var cycle race and was held on 24 February 1980. The race started in Nice and finished in Seillans. The race was won by Pascal Simon.

== General classification ==
Final general classification

| Rank | Rider | Time |
|---|---|---|
| 1 | Pascal Simon (FRA) | 5h 07' 25" |
| 2 | Sean Kelly (IRL) | + 1' 35" |
| 3 | Guy Sibille (FRA) | + 1' 35" |
| 4 | Charly Bérard (FRA) | + 1' 35" |
| 5 | René Bittinger (FRA) | + 1' 35" |
| 6 | Jean-Luc Vandenbroucke (BEL) | + 1' 35" |
| 7 | Dominique Sanders (FRA) | + 1' 35" |
| 8 | Patrice Thévenard (FRA) | + 1' 35" |
| 9 | Daniel Willems (BEL) | + 1' 35" |
| 10 | Patrick Perret (FRA) | + 1' 35" |
