= Jean-Marie Michel =

French cyclist

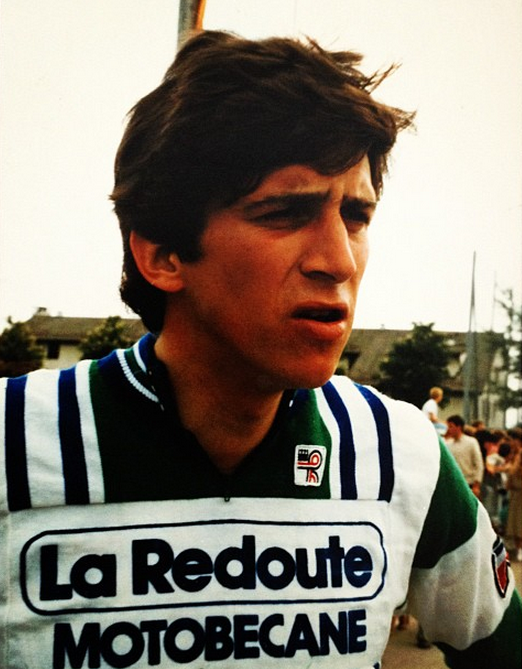
- Jean-Marie Michel at the 1979 Tour de France

Personal information
- Born: 28 April 1955 (age 71) Talence, France

Cycling career
- Sport: Cycling
- Role: Rider

Jean-Marie Michel (born 28 April 1955) is a former French racing cyclist. He rode in the 1979 and 1980 Tour de France.
