= Benjamin Vermeulen =

Belgian cyclist

Personal information
- Born: 15 July 1957 (age 69) Sint-Niklaas, Belgium

Cycling career
- Sport: Cycling
- Role: Rider

Benjamin Vermeulen (born 15 July 1957) is a former Belgian racing cyclist. He rode in the 1980 and 1981 Tour de France.
