= Charles Jochums =

Belgian cyclist

Personal information
- Born: 1 May 1957 (age 69) Antwerp, Belgium

Cycling career
- Sport: Cycling
- Role: Rider

Charles Jochums (born 1 May 1957) is a former Belgian racing cyclist. He rode in the 1980 Tour de France.
