= 1985 Vuelta a Murcia =

Race details
- Dates: 26 February–3 March 1985
- Stages: 5 + Prologue
- Distance: 778.5 km (483.7 mi)
- Winning time: 19h 45' 12"

Results
	Winner	José Recio (ESP)
	Second	Jesus Blanco Villar (ESP)
	Third	Pedro Delgado (ESP)

The 1985 Vuelta a Murcia was the first professional edition of the Vuelta a Murcia cycle race and was held on 26 February to 3 March 1985. The race started and finished in Murcia. The race was won by José Recio.

== General classification ==
Final general classification

Rank	Rider	Time
1	José Recio (ESP)	19h 45' 12"
2	Jesús Blanco Villar (ESP)	+ 17"
3	Pedro Delgado (ESP)	+ 20"
4	Ángel Camarillo (ESP)	+ 21"
5	Ludo Loos (BEL)	+ 1' 01"
6	Jaime Salva Lull (ESP)	+ 1' 13"
7	Francisco Rodríguez Maldonado (COL)	+ 1' 13"
8	Francisco Espinosa (ESP)	+ 1' 43"
9	Bernardo Alfonsel (ESP)	+ 1' 49"
10	Mariano Sánchez Martinez (ESP)	+ 2' 46"
