= Jean-Louis Gauthier =

French cyclist

Personal information
- Born: 22 December 1955 Angoulême, France
- Died: 11 July 2014 (aged 58)

Cycling career
- Sport: Cycling
- Discipline: Road
- Role: Rider

Professional teams
- 1978: Lejeune–BP
- 1979–1981: Miko–Mercier
- 1982–1983: Coop–Mercier
- 1984: Coop–Hoonved
- 1985: La Redoute
- 1986: RMO–Meral–Mavic
- 1987: Z–Peugeot

Major wins
- One stage 1980 Tour de France

Jean-Louis Gauthier (22 December 1955 – 11 July 2014) was a French professional road bicycle racer. He was professional from 1977 to 1987 and won 2 victories. He won a stage in the 1980 Tour de France and wore the yellow jersey as leader of the general classification for one day in the 1983 Tour de France.

== Career achievements ==
=== Major results ===
1980
Vailly-sur-Sauldre
Tour de France:

Winner stage 6

1983
Tour de France:

Wearing yellow jersey for one day

1987
Breuillet

=== Grand Tour general classification results timeline ===
Grand Tour	1978	1979	1980	1981	1982	1983	1984	1985	1986	1987
Giro d'Italia	—	—	—	—	—	—	—	—	—	—
Tour de France	69	50	50	58	104	76	97	69	DNF	134
Vuelta a España	—	52	—	—	—	—	—	—	—	—
