= Patrick Pevenage =

Belgian cyclist

Personal information
- Born: 8 November 1956 (age 69) Geraardsbergen, Belgium

Cycling career
- Sport: Cycling
- Role: Rider

Professional teams
- 1979: DAF Trucks–Aida
- 1980: DAF Trucks–Lejeune
- 1981: DAF Trucks–Côte d'Or
- 1982: Europ Decor

Patrick Pevenage (born 8 November 1956) is a former Belgian racing cyclist. He rode in the 1980 Tour de France.
