= Philippe Tesnière =

French cyclist

Personal information
- Full name: Philippe Tesnière
- Born: 1 February 1955 Ernée, France
- Died: 8 December 1987 (aged 32) Ernée, France

Cycling career
- Sport: Cycling
- Role: Rider

Professional teams
- 1978–1979: Fiat
- 1980–1981: Boston

Philippe Tesnière was a professional cyclist between 1978 and 1981, finishing in last place in the 1978 Tour de France.

== Biography ==
Tesnière became a professional cyclist in 1978 for the Fiat team, and started in the 1978 Tour de France. He finished in last place, and this gave him enough publicity to be invited for several post-Tour criteriums after the Tour.

In 1979, Tesnière rode the Tour de France, and after the 20th stage he occupied the last place in the general classification. Tesnière was also leading the intermediate sprints classification, and wanted to profit from the publicity of winning the intermediate sprints classification while finishing last in the general classification. However, he was worried that Gerhard Schönbacher, second-to-last in the general classification, would take over the last place. The 21st stage was run as an individual time trial, and Tesnière rode extra slow to secure his last place. The winner of the time trial, Bernard Hinault, took 1 hour, 8 minutes and 53 seconds to cover the 48.8 km, while Tesniere rode it in 1 hour, 23 minutes and 32 seconds; slower than all other cyclists. Tesnière's time was more than 20% slower than Hinault's, which meant that he had missed the time cut, and was taken out of the race.

The Fiat team folded at the end of 1979, and Tesnière started 1980 without a contract, but he was given the chance to ride the Tour de France for the team "les amis du Tour", a team especially made for cyclists without a sponsor. For the Tour, this team was combined with the Boston team, and the team leader from Boston told Tesnière that he could sign a contract if he would show something special in the Tour. Tesnière escaped in the first stage, and although he did not stay away until the finish, he collected enough points for the mountains classification to become the leader for two stages, which gave his team publicity. Tesnière collided in the third stage with a spectator and had to leave the race, but still he was given a contract for Boston.

In 1981, Tesnière rode the Tour de France for Boston. He finished the race in the penultimate 120th position. At the end of the season, the team folded, and Tesnière's professional career ended. Tesnière rode for four more years as an amateur, until 1985.

Tesnière was diagnosed with cancer in 1987, and died six months later.

== Major results ==
1981
Tour d'Indre et Loire: Stage 2
1983
Tour de la Manche
1985
Prix Gilbert Bousquet
