= Daniel Plummer =

Belgian cyclist

Personal information
- Born: 2 January 1957 (age 69) Bastogne, Belgium

Cycling career
- Sport: Cycling
- Role: Rider

Daniel Plummer (born 2 January 1957) is a former Belgian racing cyclist. He rode the 1980 Tour de France.
