= Raymond Martin (cyclist) =

French cyclist (born 1949)

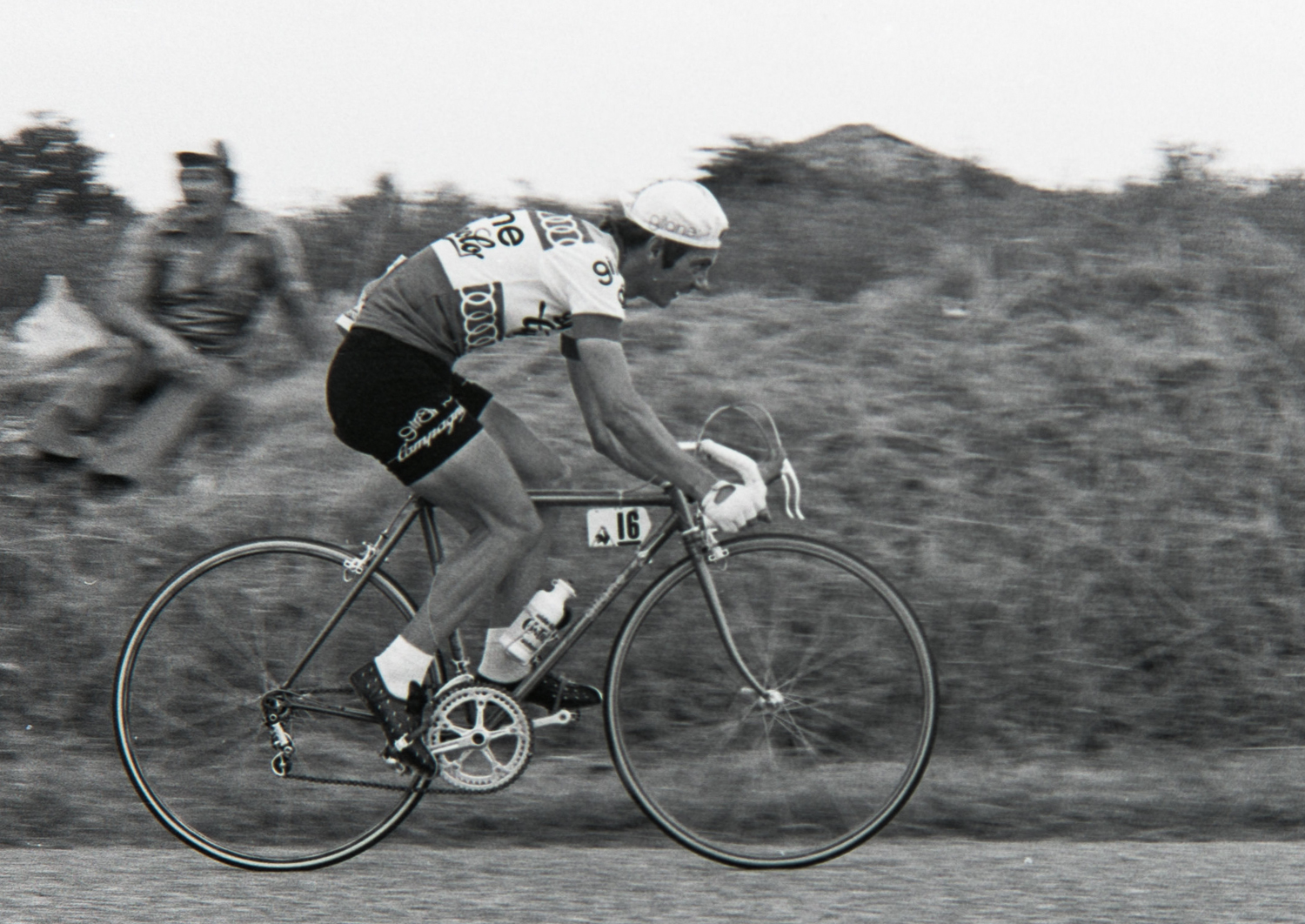
- Martin at the 1976 Tour de France

Personal information
- Full name: Raymond Martin
- Born: 22 May 1949 (age 77) Saint-Pierre-du-Regard, France

Cycling career
- Sport: Cycling
- Current team: Retired
- Discipline: Road
- Role: Rider

Professional teams
- 1973: Gitane–Frigécrème
- 1974–1976: Sonolor–Gitane
- 1977–1983: Miko–Mercier–Hutchinson

Major wins
- Grand Tours Tour de France Mountains classification (1980) 1 individual stage (1980)

Raymond Martin (born 22 May 1949) is a former French road bicycle racer. In the 1980 Tour de France he finished third overall and won the mountains classification. He also competed in the individual road race at the 1972 Summer Olympics.

== Major results ==
1972
1st Stage 5a Grand Prix Guillaume Tell
6th Overall Trophée Peugeot de l'Avenir

1st Stage 3

1973
6th Overall Grand Prix du Midi Libre
1974
1st GP Ouest-France
10th Circuit de l'Aulne
1975
1st Paris–Camembert
8th Overall Grand Prix du Midi Libre
1976
3rd Critérium National de la Route
7th Overall Tour de l'Aude
1977
5th GP Ouest-France
1978
1st Grand Prix de Plumelec
1st Stage 3 Circuit de la Sarthe-Pays de la Loire
4th Overall Critérium National de la Route

1st Stage 1

10th Overall Tour de l'Aude
1979
1st Paris–Camembert
5th Overall Tour du Vaucluse
7th Overall Critérium National de la Route
9th Road race, National Road Championships
1980
1st Trophée des Grimpeurs
2nd Overall Critérium du Dauphiné Libéré

1st Stages 1b (TTT) & 7

3rd Road race, National Road Championships
3rd Overall Tour de France

1st Mountains classification
1st Stage 13

3rd Polynormande
7th Tour de Romandie
10th Overall Grand Prix du Midi Libre
10th Overall Escalada a Montjuïc

1st Stage 1a (ITT)

10th Tour du Haut Var
1981
2nd Polynormande
3rd GP Ouest-France
8th Overall Grand Prix du Midi Libre
1982
3rd Trophée des Grimpeurs
8th Overall Tour de France
1983
3rd Paris–Camembert
3rd Tour de Vendée

=== Grand Tour general classification results timeline ===
Grand Tour	1973	1974	1975	1976	1977	1978	1979	1980	1981	1982	1983
Vuelta a España	—	—	—	—	—	—	13	—	—	—	—
Giro d'Italia	Did not contest during career										
Tour de France	35	—	30	15	11	12	24	3	17	8	43

Legend
—	Did not compete
DNF	Did not finish
