= Patrick Busolini =

French cyclist

Personal information
- Born: 14 November 1954 (age 71) Chaumont, France

Cycling career
- Sport: Cycling
- Role: Rider

Patrick Busolini (born 14 November 1954) is a former French racing cyclist. He rode in the 1979 and 1980 Tour de France.
