= Jan Jonkers =

Dutch cyclist

Personal information
- Born: 29 August 1955 (age 71) Oud Gastel, Netherlands

Cycling career
- Sport: Cycling
- Role: Rider

Jan Jonkers (born 29 August 1955) is a former Dutch racing cyclist. He rode in the 1980 and 1981 Tour de France.
