= Jesús Guzmán Delgado =

Spanish cyclist

Personal information
- Born: 30 May 1957 (age 69)

Cycling career
- Sport: Cycling
- Role: Rider

Jesús Guzmán Delgado (born 30 May 1957) is a Spanish racing cyclist. He rode in the 1980 Tour de France.
