= Hans-Peter Jakst =

German cyclist

Personal information
- Born: 23 July 1954 (age 72) Osnabrück, West Germany

Cycling career
- Sport: Cycling
- Role: Rider

Hans-Peter Jakst (born 23 July 1954) is a German former racing cyclist. He won the German National Road Race in 1979. He also competed at the 1976 Summer Olympics.
