= Jean-Raymond Toso =

French cyclist

Personal information
- Born: 17 December 1952 (age 73) Aulnay-sous-Bois, France

Cycling career
- Sport: Cycling
- Role: Rider

Jean-Raymond Toso (born 17 December 1952) is a former French racing cyclist. He rode in the 1980 Tour de France.
