= Christian Seznec =

French cyclist

Personal information
- Full name: Christian Seznec
- Born: 19 November 1952 (age 73) Brest, France

Cycling career
- Sport: Cycling
- Discipline: Road
- Role: Rider

Major wins
- 2 stages Tour de France

Christian Seznec (born 19 November 1952, in Brest) was a French professional road bicycle racer.

== Major results ==
1975
Le Quillo
1978
Concarneau
Tour de France:

Winner stage 17
5th place overall classification

1979
Tour de France:

Winner stage 12

1980
Tour de France:

6th place overall classification
