= Cordon, Haute-Savoie =

Cordon Kordon (Savoyard)
- Commune
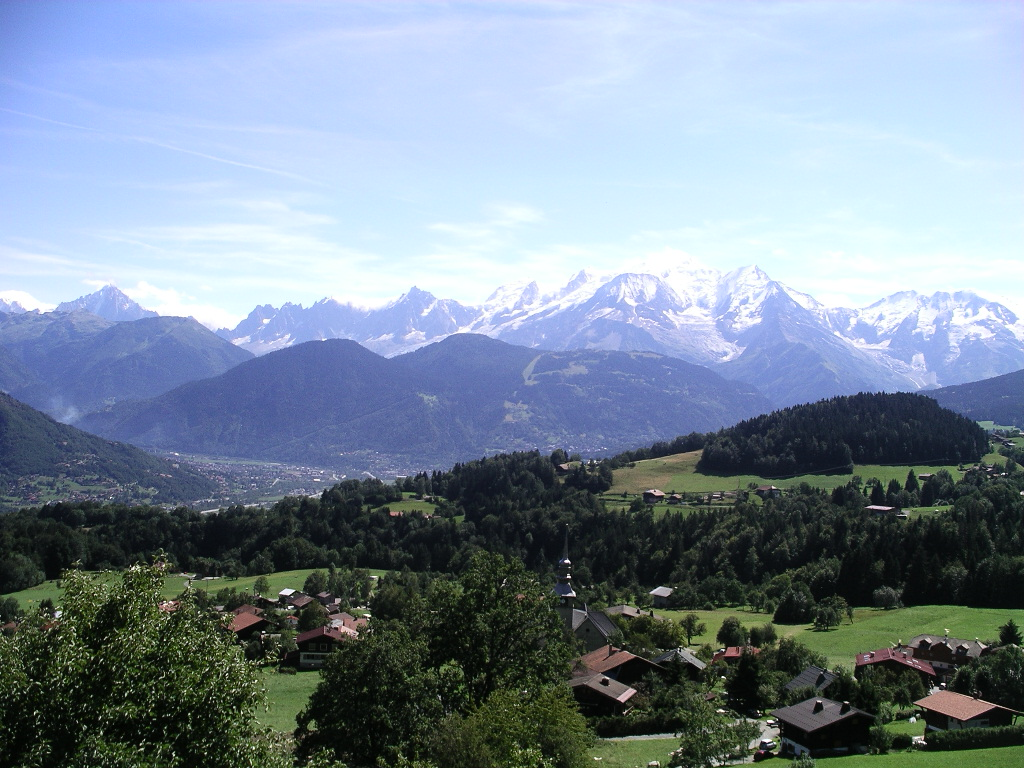
- Cordon with the Mont-Blanc mountains in the background
- Location of Cordon
- Location within France Location within Auvergne-Rhône-Alpes
- Coordinates: 45°55′26″N 6°36′46″E
- Country: France
- Region: Auvergne-Rhône-Alpes
- Department: Haute-Savoie
- Arrondissement: Bonneville
- Canton: Sallanches
- Intercommunality: Pays du Mont-Blanc

Government
  - Mayor (2023–2026): François Paris
- Area^{1}: 22.35 km^{2} (8.63 sq mi)
- Highest elevation: 2,520 m (8,270 ft)
- Lowest elevation: 580 m (1,900 ft)
- Population (2023): 998
  - Density: 44.7/km^{2} (116/sq mi)
- Time zone: UTC+01:00 (CET)
  - Summer (DST): UTC+02:00 (CEST)
- INSEE/Postal code: 74089 /74700
- ^{1} French Land Register data, which excludes lakes, ponds, glaciers > 1 km^{2} (0.386 sq mi or 247 acres) and river estuaries.

Cordon (French pronunciation: [kɔʁdɔ̃]; Savoyard: Kordon) is a commune in the Haute-Savoie department in the Auvergne-Rhône-Alpes region in south-eastern France. It is part of the urban area of Sallanches.

== See also ==
- Communes of the Haute-Savoie department
