= Pol Verschuere =

Belgian cyclist

Personal information
- Full name: Pol Verschuere
- Born: 18 January 1955 (age 71) Kortrijk, Belgium

Cycling career
- Sport: Cycling
- Current team: Retired
- Discipline: Road
- Role: Rider

Major wins
- 3 Tour de France stages

Pol Verschuere (Kortrijk, 18 January 1955) was a Belgian professional road bicycle racer. Verschuere won a stage in the 1980, 1982 and the 1986 Tour de France.

== Major results ==
1975
Belgium National Amateur Road Race Championship
1978
Izegem
Kortrijk
Trèfle à Quatre Feuilles
1979
Grote Prijs Stad Zottegem
1980
Soignies
Tour de France:

Winner stage 22

1981
Le Samyn
1982
Ninove
Tour de France:

Winner stage 7

Beernem
1983
Dentergem
1986
De Haan
Tour de France:

Winner stage 1

1987
Beernem
