= Dirk Wayenberg =

Belgian cyclist

Personal information
- Full name: Dirk Wayenberg
- Born: 14 September 1955 Geraardsbergen, Belgium
- Died: 15 March 2007 (aged 51) Temse, Belgium

Cycling career
- Sport: Cycling
- Role: Rider

Dirk Wayenberg (14 September 1955 – 15 March 2007) was a Belgian racing cyclist. He finished in last place in the 1988 Tour de France.
