= Gerhard Schönbacher =

Austrian cyclist

Personal information
- Full name: Gerhard Schönbacher
- Born: 25 January 1954 (age 72) Graz, Austria

Cycling career
- Sport: Cycling
- Current team: Retired
- Role: Rider

Professional teams
- 1977: Carlos
- 1978: Mini Flat
- 1979: Daf Trucks
- 1980: Marc
- 1981–1985: Puch
- 1987: Atomic
- 1991: Varta

Managerial team
- 1991–1994: Varta

Gerhard Schönbacher (born 25 January 1954) is a former professional cyclist. Schönbacher was a professional cyclist for nine seasons, and rode the UCI World Championships seven times, but is mainly known for finishing last in the Tour de France in two consecutive years.

== Biography ==
Schönbacher was born in Graz, Austria on 25 January 1954. In 1977, he became a professional cyclist.

=== 1979 Tour de France ===
In the 1979 Tour de France, Schönbacher rode for the DAF team. Schönbacher lost a lot of time in the mountains, and after the 20th stage, he only had Philippe Tesnière behind him in the general classification. Tesnière had already finished last in the 1978 Tour de France, so he was aware of the publicity associated with being the lanterne rouge. In the 21st stage, Tesnière therefore rode extra slow. The winner of the time trial, Bernard Hinault, took 1 hour, 8 minutes and 53 seconds to cover the 48.8 km, Schönbacher used 1 hour, 21 minutes and 52 seconds, while Tesniere rode it in 1 hour, 23 minutes and 32 seconds; both were slower than all other cyclists. Tesnière's time was more than 20% slower than Hinault's, which meant that he had missed the time cut, and was taken out of the race.

In the final stage, the riders traditionally keep a slow pace, because the winner is already known, but in 1979 this was not the case, and Bernard Hinault and Joop Zoetemelk were still battling for the overall victory. A large group, including Schönbacher could not keep up with the pace, and finished seven minutes behind Hinault. When Schönbacher was near the finish, he stopped and kissed the road, before he crossed the finishline.

=== 1980 Tour de France ===
The Tour de France organisers did not like the attention that last-placed finishers got, so for the 1980 Tour de France they added the rule that after some stages the last-placed cyclist in the general classification would be removed from the race. Still, Schönbacher managed to finish last.

Before the Tour, Schönbacher was promised by his sponsor that he would receive extra money if he finished in last place. After the last stage of the Tour, his team leader Patrick Lefevere told Schönbacher that he would not get the money, and after a heated discussion Schönbacher was fired.

=== Later career ===
Schönbacher found a new team, Puch, and rode the 1981 Tour de France, finishing 112th out of 121 cyclists. During the race, when it became clear he would not finish in last place, he jokingly said that had not expected that there would be a worse cyclist than him. In 1985, Schönbacher was hit by a car in Australia, and had to end his professional career. He had a brief comeback in 1987, when he rode the 1987 UCI Road World Championships for a private sponsor.

Schönbacher was a team leader of the Varta team from 1990 to 1994. In the second half of 1991, Schönbacher had a licence to ride as a professional, but he did not compete any races.

Later, Schönbacher became a race organizer, and organizes the mountainbike stage race Crocodile Trophy in Australia.

After Schönbacher went 220 km/h, standing on skis on top of a car, this record was included in the Guinness Book of Records.
