= Patrick Bonnet =

French cyclist

Personal information
- Born: 6 September 1957 (age 69) Montpellier, France

Cycling career
- Sport: Cycling
- Current team: Retired
- Discipline: Road
- Role: Rider

Professional teams
- 1979: Flandria–Ça va seul
- 1980–1982: Renault–Gitane
- 1983–1984: Wolber–Spidel
- 1985: André Trioulier–ELM Leblanc
- 1986: Miko–Carlos

Patrick Bonnet (born 6 September 1957) is a former French racing cyclist. He rode in five editions of the Tour de France between 1979 and 1984.

== Major results ==
1979
1st Prologue Tour de Corse
4th Overall Grand Prix du Midi Libre
4th GP Ouest-France
1980
1st Overall Tour de l'Oise

1st Prologue

1st Stage 4 Tour du Limousin
2nd Overall Route du Sud
8th GP Ouest-France
1981
Tour de l'Avenir

1st Stages 5 & 6
1st Points classification

1st Stages 1 & 3a Tour d'Armorique
2nd Overall Tour de l'Oise
6th Paris–Tours
6th Paris–Bruxelles
10th Overall Critérium International
1982
1st Stage 1 1982 Giro d'Italia (TTT)
2nd Overall Tour de l'Aude
3rd Overall Étoile de Bessèges
1983
1st Prologue Tour du Vaucluse
3rd Overall Grand Prix du Midi Libre
1984
2nd Grand Prix de Plumelec-Morbihan
7th Overall Grand Prix du Midi Libre

1st Prologue
