= Patrice Thévenard =

French cyclist

Personal information
- Born: 25 October 1954 (age 71) Carnetin, France

Cycling career
- Sport: Cycling
- Role: Rider

Patrice Thévenard (born 25 October 1954) is a former French racing cyclist. His sporting career began with ACBB Paris. He rode in three editions of the Tour de France between 1979 and 1984.
