= 1980 Tour de France =

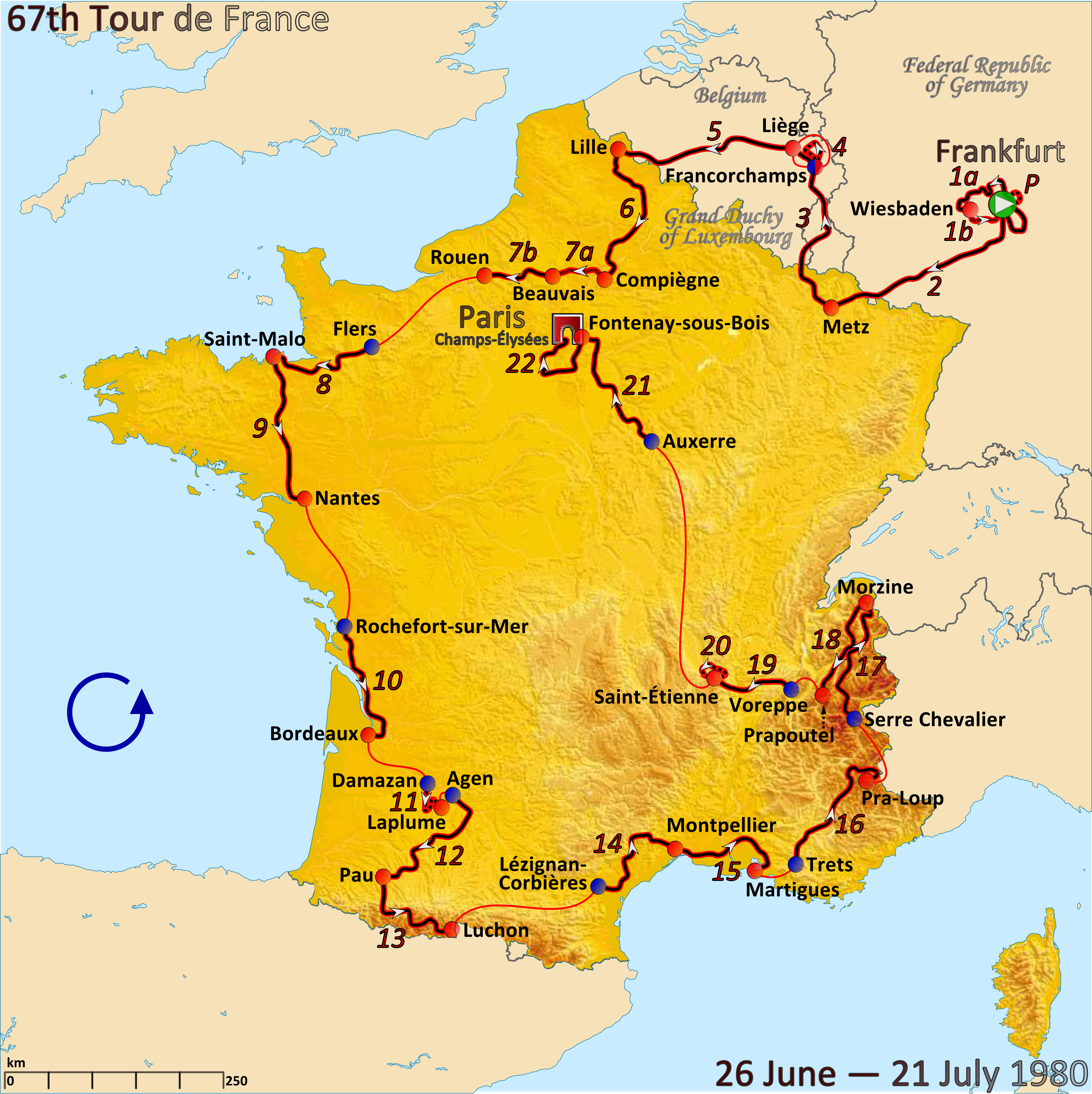
- Route of the 1980 Tour de France

Race details
- Dates: 26 June – 20 July 1980
- Stages: 22 + Prologue, including two split stages
- Distance: 3,842 km (2,387 mi)
- Winning time: 109h 19' 14"

Results
Jersey awarded to the overall winner	Winner	Joop Zoetemelk (NED)	(TI–Raleigh–Creda)
	Second	Hennie Kuiper (NED)	(Peugeot–Esso–Michelin)
	Third	Raymond Martin (FRA)	(Miko–Mercier–Vivagel)
Jersey awarded to the points classification winner	Points	Rudy Pevenage (BEL)	(IJsboerke–Warncke Eis)
Jersey awarded to the mountains classification winner	Mountains	Raymond Martin (FRA)	(Miko–Mercier–Vivagel)
Jersey awarded to the young rider classification winner	Young rider	Johan van der Velde (NED)	(TI–Raleigh–Creda)
	Combination	Ludo Peeters (BEL)	(IJsboerke–Warncke Eis)
	Sprints	Rudy Pevenage (BEL)	(IJsboerke–Warncke Eis)
	Combativity	Christian Levavasseur (FRA)	(Miko–Mercier–Vivagel)
	Team	Miko–Mercier–Vivagel	
	Team points	TI–Raleigh–Creda	

The 1980 Tour de France was the 67th edition of the Tour de France. The total distance was 3,842 km (2,387 mi) over 22 stages. In the first half of the race, Bernard Hinault started out strong by winning the prologue and two stages. However, knee problems forced Hinault to abandon the race while still in the lead. Joop Zoetemelk became the new leader, and defended that position successfully. Just as in 1979, when Hinault and Zoetemelk finished nearly a half hour ahead of the rest of the field, the 1980 edition was a battle between these two riders until Hinault abandoned. At the time Hinault was just 21 seconds ahead of Zoetemelk and the race was about to enter the Pyrenees. Zoetemelk did not wear the yellow jersey during stage 13 though he did in every stage thereafter finishing the race with nearly a seven-minute advantage over second place Hennie Kuiper. It was his first Tour victory in his tenth attempt, after already having finished second in five editions.

The points classification was won by Rudy Pevenage, who also won the intermediate sprints classification. The mountains classification was won by Raymond Martin, and Johan van der Velde won the young rider classification.

== Teams ==
Two weeks before the Tour would start, there were only twelve teams interested in starting the Tour. The teams with Italian and Spanish sponsors were focussed on the Giro d'Italia and the Vuelta a España, and thought their cyclists were not able to compete in two grand tours in one year. This prevented Giovanni Battaglin of the Spanish-based Inoxpran, the winner of the mountains classification of 1979, from defending his title. Francesco Moser, who had left the 1980 Giro d'Italia injured, was the only Italian cyclist on the initial starting list, but he was not able to start, so the 1980 Tour was without Italian cyclists. One more team was added to the starting list, so the Tour 1980 started with thirteen teams, each with ten cyclists. The Boston–Mavic–Amis du Tour team was a combination of the Belgian Boston–Mavic team and French cyclists without a contract, combined into the "Amis du Tour" team.

The teams entering the race were:

- Renault–Gitane
- TI–Raleigh–Creda
- Puch–Sem–Campagnolo
- Peugeot–Esso–Michelin
- DAF Trucks–Lejeune
- Splendor–Admiral
- Marc–IWC–V.R.D.
- Miko–Mercier–Vivagel
- La Redoute–Motobécane
- IJsboerke–Warncke Eis
- Boston–Mavic–Amis du Tour
- Teka
- Kelme–Gios

== Pre-race favourites ==
The three most important favourites for the victory were Bernard Hinault, Joop Zoetemelk and Hennie Kuiper. Hinault was the winner of the two last editions, and had earlier that year won the 1980 Giro d'Italia. Zoetemelk, the runner-up of the last two editions, had switched teams to the TI–Raleigh team, which was considered one of the strongest teams. Kuiper had left the TI–Raleigh team and moved to the Peugeot team. The manager of that team, Maurice De Muer, had already managed Bernard Thévenet to a Tour win, and this made Kuiper confident.

== Route and stages ==
The 1980 Tour de France started on 26 June, and had two rest days, in Saint-Malo and Morzine. The highest point of elevation in the race was 2,642 m (8,668 ft) at the summit of the Col du Galibier mountain pass on stage 17.

Before the race, Hinault expressed dissatisfaction with the cobbled sections in stages five and six. In the 1979 Tour, Hinault had lost time in these sections, and he considered to organise a strike. Even though no strike was held, the route was still changed: after the fifth stage, tour organiser Félix Lévitan decided to change the first 20 kilometres (12 mi) of the stage, to avoid the worst cobbled sections.

The 25 stages were won by riders from only four countries. In this year's edition of the Tour, the last rider in the general classification after the consecutives mountain stages (16-19) was eliminated.

Stage characteristics and winners
Stage	Date	Course	Distance	Type	Winner
P	26 June	Frankfurt (West Germany)	8 km (5.0 mi)	Individual time trial	Bernard Hinault (FRA)
1a	27 June	Frankfurt (West Germany) to Wiesbaden (West Germany)	133 km (83 mi)	Plain stage	Jan Raas (NED)
1b	27 June	Wiesbaden (West Germany) to Frankfurt (West Germany)	46 km (29 mi)	Team time trial	(Netherlands) TI–Raleigh–Creda
2	28 June	Frankfurt (West Germany) to Metz	276 km (171 mi)	Plain stage	Rudy Pevenage (BEL)
3	29 June	Metz to Liège (Belgium)	282 km (175 mi)	Plain stage	Henk Lubberding (NED)
4	30 June	Spa (Belgium)	35 km (22 mi)	Individual time trial	Bernard Hinault (FRA)
5	1 July	Liège (Belgium) to Lille	249 km (155 mi)	Plain stage	Bernard Hinault (FRA)
6	2 July	Lille to Compiègne	216 km (134 mi)	Plain stage	Jean-Louis Gauthier (FRA)
7a	3 July	Compiègne to Beauvais	65 km (40 mi)	Team time trial	(Netherlands) TI–Raleigh–Creda
7b	3 July	Beauvais to Rouen	92 km (57 mi)	Plain stage	Jan Raas (NED)
8	4 July	Flers to Saint-Malo	164 km (102 mi)	Plain stage	Bert Oosterbosch (NED)
	5 July	Saint-Malo		Rest day	
9	6 July	Saint-Malo to Nantes	205 km (127 mi)	Plain stage	Jan Raas (NED)
10	7 July	Rochefort to Bordeaux	163 km (101 mi)	Plain stage	Cees Priem (NED)
11	8 July	Damazan to Laplume	52 km (32 mi)	Individual time trial	Joop Zoetemelk (NED)
12	9 July	Agen to Pau	194 km (121 mi)	Plain stage	Gerrie Knetemann (NED)
13	10 July	Pau to Bagnères-de-Luchon	200 km (120 mi)	Stage with mountain(s)	Raymond Martin (FRA)
14	11 July	Lézignan-Corbières to Montpellier	189 km (117 mi)	Plain stage	Ludo Peeters (BEL)
15	12 July	Montpellier to Martigues	160 km (99 mi)	Plain stage	Bernard Vallet (FRA)
16	13 July	Trets to Pra-Loup	209 km (130 mi)	Stage with mountain(s)	Jos De Schoenmaecker (BEL)
17	14 July	Serre Chevalier to Morzine	242 km (150 mi)	Stage with mountain(s)	Mariano Martínez (FRA)
	15 July	Morzine		Rest day	
18	16 July	Morzine to Prapoutel	199 km (124 mi)	Stage with mountain(s)	Ludo Loos (BEL)
19	17 July	Voreppe to Saint-Étienne	140 km (87 mi)	Hilly stage	Sean Kelly (IRE)
20	18 July	Saint-Étienne	34 km (21 mi)	Individual time trial	Joop Zoetemelk (NED)
21	19 July	Auxerre to Fontenay-sous-Bois	208 km (129 mi)	Plain stage	Sean Kelly (IRE)
22	20 July	Fontenay-sous-Bois to Paris (Champs-Élysées)	186 km (116 mi)	Plain stage	Pol Verschuere (BEL)
	Total		3,842 km (2,387 mi)		

== Race overview ==
The prologue was won by Hinault, who finished :05 ahead of Gerrie Knetemann and 0:23 ahead of the closest general classification rider Hennie Kuiper. Stage 1A was a sprint finish won by Jan Raas and Stage 1B was the first Team Time Trial in which TI–Raleigh claimed the victory ahead of Renault and Peugeot gaining enough in the time bonus for Knetemann to become the new leader. In Stage 2 Rudy Pevenage, Yvon Bertin and Pierre Bazzo escaped in a breakaway and were able to stay away the entire stage winning by nearly ten minutes over the rest of the field. Pevenage claimed the stage victory with Bazzo taking second and while Bertin took third he was the highest placed of the three and took over the lead in the general classification.

Stage 3 was won by Henk Lubberding and Bertin ended up falling off the back losing considerable time, which made Pevenage the new overall leader going into the second individual time trial (ITT) in Stage 4. Bernard Hinault was aiming to win his third straight Tour de France and in the ITT he looked to be well on his way dominating the rest of the field. Of the 122 riders remaining in the main field only six of them were able to come within 2:00 of Hinault and nobody was able to finish within a minute of the defending champ. Joop Zoetemelk was the closest to him taking second place at 1:16 back and in the overall situation overall Pevenage remained leader by about a minute over Bazzo with Hinault closing the gap to within six minutes.

Stage 5 was run in terrible weather, but the aggressive Hinault was looking to distance himself from the competition and went on the offensive together with Kuiper. Hinault won the stage, with Kuiper finishing right on his wheel, gaining more than two minutes on all of the other of the general classification Riders although following this stage many riders began experiencing tendinitis problems, including Hinault. Going into Stage 6 Hinault was within four minutes of Pevenage in the general classification and built a lead of more than 3:00 on Kuiper, nearly 4:00 on Zoetemelk and more than 5:00 on Raymond Martin and Joaquim Agostinho. The stage was won by Jean-Louis Gauthier by a full second over the rest of the field with no major changes in the overall classification.

Stage 7A would prove to be the beginning of a remarkable run by the TI–Raleigh team, who won the team time trial (TTT) beginning a stretch where a rider from this team would win seven stages in a row. During this TTT Hinault's knee problems were showing, as he could not do his part of the workload, although his Renault team still managed a respectable 4th place behind Raleigh, Peugeot and Ijsboerke. ‘Panzer Group Post’ as they were known because of their Directeur Sportif Peter Post, attacked relentlessly in an effort to win stages and contain any attacks made by Hinault to put Zoetemelk in a position where he could defeat Hinault in the upcoming high mountain stages. The plan was working as Stage 7B was won by Jan Raas, Stage 8 by Bert Oosterbosch, Raas would win again in Stage 9 and Stage 10 was won by Cees Priem. After stage 10 Pevenage was still in Yellow by 2:44 over Bazzo with a 4:20 advantage over Hinault, however The Badger was in the lead among the serious contenders although his lead over Zoetemelk had been cut to 2:00 with Kuiper 2:24 behind Hinault.

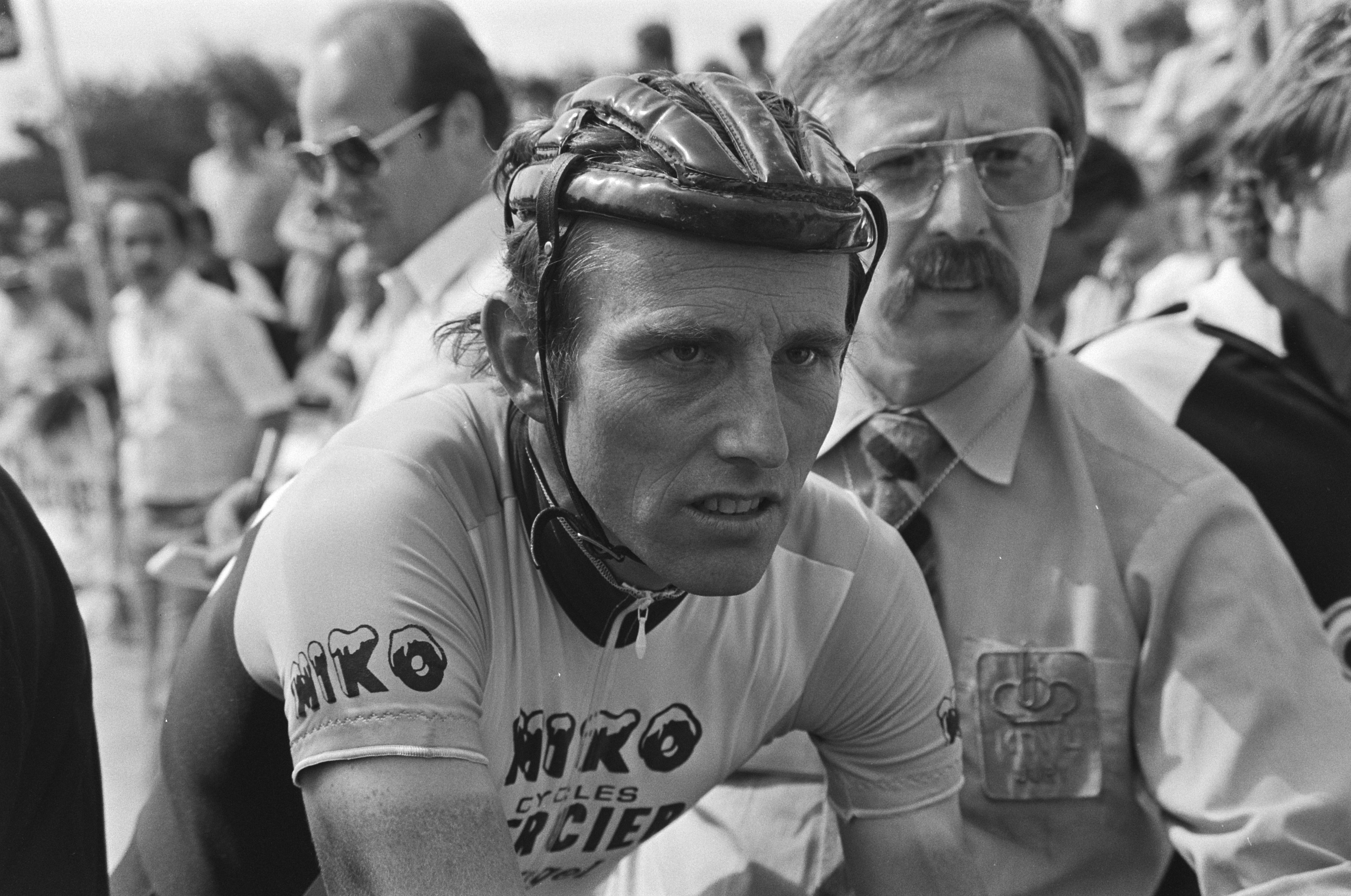
Joop Zoetemelk (pictured in 1979), winner of the general classification

Stage 11 was a time trial prior to going into the high mountains of the Pyrenees and if Hinault wanted to match the likes of Louison Bobet, Jacques Anquetil and Eddy Merckx by winning his third Tour de France in a row he would have to perform well. The day however, belonged to Zoetemelk as he took the Stage victory with only eight riders finishing within 2:00 of him. Finishing 0:46 behind was Hennie Kuiper with Agostinho coming in 3rd, Oosterbosch finishing 4th and Hinault in 5th 1:39 back. Hinault was back in the yellow jersey but his lead over Zoetemelk was a minuscule 0:21. Rudy Pevenage fell to 3rd place and Kuiper was 1:31 back with no other general classification (GC) contenders within 5:00. Normally, Hinault was the better time trialist, so Zoetemelk's stage victory made him confident that he had the chance to win the Tour.

In Stage 12, Gerrie Knetemann and Ludo Peeters escaped and managed to beat the Peloton by more than a minute with Knetemann beating Peeters at the finish line. Late that evening, with the first stage of the high mountains looming, Hinault decided to withdraw. Zoetemelk, until that moment second in the general classification, became the new leader, but refused to don the yellow jersey during the following stage following the example of Eddy Merckx who refused to wear it in the 1971 Tour de France after Luis Ocaña left the race as leader. In Stage 13, Zoetemelk rode in his notoriously conservative style, allowing Raymond Martin to escape, as he was a distant threat in the general classification, but he kept Kuiper close, who was now his main rival for the overall victory. Zoetemelk would not stray from who he was as a rider and maintained this defensive tactic for the rest of the race. Martin won the stage breaking the impressive streak of TI–Raleigh and climbing into 3rd place in the process. Not only this but during this stage he distinguished himself as the strongest rider on a very talented Miko–Mercier team, who also had Christian Seznec and Sven-Åke Nilsson as GC contenders and for the previous several years also had Zoetemelk, who remained the overall leader, with Kuiper in 2nd place at 1:10 behind him. In Stage 14 Ludo Peeters escaped again, this time finishing alone more than a minute ahead of the Peloton for the stage win and in Stage 15 Bernard Vallet gutted out an impressive win finishing just four seconds ahead of Jean-Raymond Toso and the 1975 Tour de France and 1977 Tour de France winner Bernard Thévenet who was nearing the end of his career.

Going into Stage 16 Zoetemelk was now 1:18 ahead of Kuiper and 5:03 ahead of his former teammate Martin. In the 16th stage, one of Zoetemelk's present teammates Johan van der Velde, who had been riding a very good Tour, nearly fell off his bike and cut off Zoetemelk with van der Velde's back tire hitting Zoetemelk's front causing him to viciously crash into the pavement. Zoetemelk quickly remounted and continued the race but was bleeding from his arm and thigh. Jos De Schoenmaecker won the stage with the group of favourites coming in over a minute later as Zoetemelk was not only able to get back to the elite group, but he also put another 0:16 into Kuiper .

The fall in the 16th stage did affect Zoetemelk's performance in stage 17, as Zoetemelk had to let others go on the first climb. Helped by the Panzer Group, he was able to stay close to his competitors and was in good position for the final climb. Mariano Martinez survived his breakaway attempt and won the stage as Zoetemelk was able to drop 2nd place Kuiper, who came partially unhinged losing almost 1:30. 3rd place Raymond Martin was able to leave Zoetemelk behind but it was near the end of the stage and by this point it was too little too late as he was only able to take 0:15 back. In Stage 18 Ludo Loos escaped and crossed all five cols first, finishing more than five minutes ahead of the Peloton in a remarkable solo stage win which turned out to be the only Tour stage victory of his career. Zoetemelk finished in the second group with Robert Alban and Lucien Van Impe nearly a minute ahead of Martin and 2:30 ahead of Kuiper who fell to 3rd place as Martin moved into 2nd. With the Alps now finished the last obstacle in the way of Zoetemelk winning his first Tour de France was the time trial in Stage 20.

Stage 19 was an Intermediate stage in which Sean Kelly and Ismael Lejarreta beat the Peloton to the line by 0:20 and Kelly earned his second career stage win by winning the sprint. The overall situation remained the same going into the time trial which was won in dominating fashion by Joop Zoetemelk with only one rider coming within a minute of him and that rider was his own teammate Gerrie Knetemann. With Kuiper and Joaquim Agostinho finishing in 3rd and 4th at plus 1:12 and 1:13 respectively, Zoetemelk was now virtually assured of the overall victory with his lead now built to about 7:00 over Kuiper, who moved back into 2nd having a considerably better ride than Martin.

Stage 21 was a flat stage which was once again won by Sean Kelly and while Kelly rode an impressive Tour competing for the points classification, he ended up finishing second in that classification to Rudy Pevenage. Between 1982 and 1989 Kelly would go on to win the points classification four times. On the final stage into Paris the blossoming star was in good position for the final sprint to go for another stage win, but he was beat to the line by Pol Verschuere, who won the first Tour stage of his career that afternoon on the Champs-Élysées. Zoetemelk crossed in the middle of the pack side by side with teammate Gerrie Knetemann, who hoisted Zoetemelk's arm into the air while crossing the finish line.

TI–Raleigh–Creda would win one of the Team Competitions and also claim an astonishing eleven stage wins, a feat which has not been repeated since. The other Team Competition was won by Miko–Mercier–Vivagel and on the final podiums Johan van der Velde claimed the white jersey as the best young rider, the green jersey for the points classification went to Pevenage, the mountains classification was won by Raymond Martin who also finished on the podium in 3rd place overall with Hennie Kuiper standing in 2nd and Joop Zoetemelk wearing the yellow jersey atop the podium as winner of the general classification in the 1980 Tour de France.

=== Doping ===
Shortly before the start of the Tour, it was announced that Dietrich Thurau had tested positive in his national championship. He was allowed to start the Tour while his B-sample was being tested. His B-sample gave a negative result, so he could continue the Tour.

On the day of the final time trial, when it was all but clear that Zoetemelk would be the winner, tour director Jacques Goddet wrote in the newspaper l'Équipe that the only thing that could keep Zoetemelk away from a Tour victory was the drug tests for anabolic products after the eighteenth stage. As the director, Goddet was well-informed about drug tests, and many journalists speculated that his comments meant that Zoetemelk's A-sample had returned positive. Zoetemelk had tested positive in 1977, and was not happy about the insinuations. Tour co-director Félix Lévitan apologised for Goddet's choice of words.

At the end of the Tour, it was announced that all doping tests had returned negative.

== Classification leadership and minor prizes ==
There were several classifications in the 1980 Tour de France, four of them awarding jerseys to their leaders. The most important was the general classification, calculated by adding each cyclist's finishing times on each stage. The cyclist with the least accumulated time was the race leader, identified by the yellow jersey; the winner of this classification is considered the winner of the Tour. In the 1979 Tour de France, Gerhard Schönbacher and Philippe Tesnière had both been trying to finish last, which had received attention from the press. The Tour organisation wanted to the press to focus on the winners, so they added the rule that after the 14th to 20th stage, the last-ranked cyclist in the general classification would be removed.

Additionally, there was a points classification, where cyclists got points for finishing among the best in a stage finish, or in intermediate sprints. The cyclist with the most points lead the classification, and was identified with a green jersey.

There was also a mountains classification. The organisation had categorised some climbs as either hors catégorie, first, second, third, or fourth-category; points for this classification were won by the first cyclists that reached the top of these climbs first, with more points available for the higher-categorised climbs. The cyclist with the most points lead the classification, and wore a white jersey with red polka dots.

Another classification was the young rider classification. This was decided the same way as the general classification, but only cyclists younger than 24 were eligible, and the leader wore a white jersey.

The fifth individual classification was the intermediate sprints classification. This classification had similar rules as the points classification, but only points were awarded on intermediate sprints. In 1980, this classification had no associated jersey.

A combination classification was also calculated; this was done by adding the points for the points classification, mountains classification, intermediate sprints classification and combativity award. A new competition was introduced in 1980, sponsored by the French television station TF1, therefore named "Grand Prix TF1". It was calculated from the results in the other classifications, and therefore seen as a successor of the combination classification that was calculated from 1968 to 1974. There was no jersey associated with the Grand Prix TF1. The Belgian Ludo Peeters won this classification.

For the team classification, the times of the best three cyclists per team on each stage were added; the leading team was the team with the lowest total time. The riders in the team that led this classification were identified by yellow caps. There was also a team points classification. Cyclists received points according to their finishing position on each stage, with the first rider receiving one point. The first three finishers of each team had their points combined, and the team with the fewest points led the classification. The riders of the team leading this classification wore green caps.

In addition, there was a combativity award given after each mass-start stage to the cyclist considered most combative. The split stages each had a combined winner. The decision was made by a jury composed of journalists who gave points. The cyclist with the most points from votes in all stages led the combativity classification. Christian Levavasseur won this classification, and was given overall the super-combativity award. The Souvenir Henri Desgrange was given in honour of Tour founder Henri Desgrange to the first rider to pass the summit of the Col du Galibier on stage 17. This prize was won by Johan De Muynck.

Classification leadership by stage
Stage	Stage winner	General classification	Points classification	Mountains classification	Young rider classification	Combination classification	Intermediate sprints classification	Team classifications		Combativity award
Stage	Stage winner	General classification	Points classification	Mountains classification	Young rider classification	Combination classification	Intermediate sprints classification	By time	By points	Combativity award
P	Bernard Hinault	Bernard Hinault	Bernard Hinault	no award	Bert Oosterbosch	no award	no award	TI–Raleigh–Creda	TI–Raleigh–Creda	not awarded
1a	Jan Raas	Bernard Hinault	Jan Raas	Philippe Tesnière	Bert Oosterbosch	Philippe Tesnière	Philippe Tesnière	TI–Raleigh–Creda	TI–Raleigh–Creda	Philippe Tesnière
1b	TI–Raleigh–Creda	Gerrie Knetemann	Jan Raas	Philippe Tesnière	Johan van der Velde	Philippe Tesnière	Philippe Tesnière	TI–Raleigh–Creda	TI–Raleigh–Creda	not awarded
2	Rudy Pevenage	Yvon Bertin	Pierre Bazzo	Philippe Tesnière	Johan van der Velde	Yvon Bertin	Yvon Bertin	Renault–Gitane	TI–Raleigh–Creda	Pierre Bazzo
3	Henk Lubberding	Rudy Pevenage	Pierre Bazzo	Jean-Luc Vandenbroucke	Ronny Claes	Pierre Bazzo	Yvon Bertin	Renault–Gitane	TI–Raleigh–Creda	Jean-Luc Vandenbroucke
4	Bernard Hinault	Rudy Pevenage	Pierre Bazzo	Jean-Luc Vandenbroucke	Ronny Claes	Pierre Bazzo	Yvon Bertin	Renault–Gitane	TI–Raleigh–Creda	not awarded
5	Bernard Hinault	Rudy Pevenage	Pierre Bazzo	Jean-Luc Vandenbroucke	Ronny Claes	Pierre Bazzo	Yvon Bertin	Renault–Gitane	TI–Raleigh–Creda	Hennie Kuiper
6	Jean-Louis Gauthier	Rudy Pevenage	Yvon Bertin	Jean-Luc Vandenbroucke	Ronny Claes	Pierre Bazzo	Yvon Bertin	Renault–Gitane	TI–Raleigh–Creda	Gery Verlinden
7a	TI–Raleigh–Creda	Rudy Pevenage	Yvon Bertin	Jean-Luc Vandenbroucke	Johan van der Velde	Pierre Bazzo	Yvon Bertin	Renault–Gitane	TI–Raleigh–Creda	—
7b	Jan Raas	Rudy Pevenage	Yvon Bertin	Jean-Luc Vandenbroucke	Johan van der Velde	Yvon Bertin	Yvon Bertin	Renault–Gitane	TI–Raleigh–Creda	Roger Legeay
8	Bert Oosterbosch	Rudy Pevenage	Yvon Bertin	Jean-Luc Vandenbroucke	Johan van der Velde	Yvon Bertin	Yvon Bertin	Renault–Gitane	TI–Raleigh–Creda	Christian Levavasseur
9	Jan Raas	Rudy Pevenage	Jan Raas	Jean-Luc Vandenbroucke	Johan van der Velde	Yvon Bertin	Yvon Bertin	Renault–Gitane	TI–Raleigh–Creda	Christian Levavasseur
10	Cees Priem	Rudy Pevenage	Jan Raas	Jean-Luc Vandenbroucke	Johan van der Velde	Jan Raas	Yvon Bertin	Renault–Gitane	TI–Raleigh–Creda	Gilbert Duclos-Lassalle
11	Joop Zoetemelk	Bernard Hinault	Jan Raas	Jean-Luc Vandenbroucke	Ronny Claes	Jan Raas	Yvon Bertin	TI–Raleigh–Creda	TI–Raleigh–Creda	not awarded
12	Gerrie Knetemann	Bernard Hinault	Jan Raas	Jean-Luc Vandenbroucke	Ronny Claes	Jan Raas	Yvon Bertin	TI–Raleigh–Creda	TI–Raleigh–Creda	Gerrie Knetemann
13	Raymond Martin	Joop Zoetemelk	Rudy Pevenage	Raymond Martin	Jean-René Bernaudeau	Pierre Bazzo	Rudy Pevenage	Peugeot–Esso–Michelin	TI–Raleigh–Creda	Raymond Martin
14	Ludo Peeters	Joop Zoetemelk	Rudy Pevenage	Raymond Martin	Jean-René Bernaudeau	Pierre Bazzo	Rudy Pevenage	Peugeot–Esso–Michelin	TI–Raleigh–Creda	Ludo Peeters
15	Bernard Vallet	Joop Zoetemelk	Rudy Pevenage	Raymond Martin	Jean-René Bernaudeau	Rudy Pevenage	Rudy Pevenage	Peugeot–Esso–Michelin	TI–Raleigh–Creda	Bernard Thévenet
16	Jos Deschoenmaecker	Joop Zoetemelk	Rudy Pevenage	Sven-Åke Nilsson	Jean-René Bernaudeau	Rudy Pevenage	Rudy Pevenage	Miko–Mercier–Vivagel	TI–Raleigh–Creda	Alberto Fernández de la Puebla
17	Mariano Martínez	Joop Zoetemelk	Rudy Pevenage	Raymond Martin	Jean-René Bernaudeau	Ludo Peeters	Rudy Pevenage	Miko–Mercier–Vivagel	TI–Raleigh–Creda	Paulino Martínez
18	Ludo Loos	Joop Zoetemelk	Rudy Pevenage	Raymond Martin	Johan van der Velde	Ludo Peeters	Rudy Pevenage	Miko–Mercier–Vivagel	TI–Raleigh–Creda	Ludo Loos
19	Sean Kelly	Joop Zoetemelk	Rudy Pevenage	Raymond Martin	Johan van der Velde	Ludo Peeters	Rudy Pevenage	Miko–Mercier–Vivagel	TI–Raleigh–Creda	Sean Kelly
20	Joop Zoetemelk	Joop Zoetemelk	Rudy Pevenage	Raymond Martin	Johan van der Velde	Ludo Peeters	Rudy Pevenage	Miko–Mercier–Vivagel	TI–Raleigh–Creda	not awarded
21	Sean Kelly	Joop Zoetemelk	Rudy Pevenage	Raymond Martin	Johan van der Velde	Ludo Peeters	Rudy Pevenage	Miko–Mercier–Vivagel	TI–Raleigh–Creda	
22	Pol Verschuere	Joop Zoetemelk	Rudy Pevenage	Raymond Martin	Johan van der Velde	Ludo Peeters	Rudy Pevenage	Miko–Mercier–Vivagel	TI–Raleigh–Creda	
Final		Joop Zoetemelk	Rudy Pevenage	Raymond Martin	Johan van der Velde	Ludo Peeters	Rudy Pevenage	Miko–Mercier–Vivagel	TI–Raleigh–Creda	Christian Levavasseur

== Final standings ==
Legend
A yellow jersey.	Denotes the winner of the general classification	A green jersey.	Denotes the winner of the points classification
A white jersey with red polka dots.	Denotes the winner of the mountains classification	A white jersey.	Denotes the winner of the young rider classification

=== General classification ===
Final general classification (1–10)
Rank	Rider	Team	Time
1	Joop Zoetemelk (NED)	TI–Raleigh–Creda	109h 19' 14"
2	Hennie Kuiper (NED)	Peugeot–Esso–Michelin	+ 6' 55"
3	Raymond Martin (FRA)	Miko–Mercier–Vivagel	+ 7' 56"
4	Johan De Muynck (BEL)	Splendor–Admiral	+ 12' 24"
5	Joaquim Agostinho (POR)	Puch–Sem–Campagnolo	+ 15' 37"
6	Christian Seznec (FRA)	Miko–Mercier–Vivagel	+ 16' 16"
7	Sven-Åke Nilsson (SWE)	Miko–Mercier–Vivagel	+ 16' 33"
8	Ludo Peeters (BEL)	IJsboerke–Warncke Eis	+ 20' 45"
9	Pierre Bazzo (FRA)	La Redoute–Motobécane	+ 21' 03"
10	Henk Lubberding (NED)	TI–Raleigh–Creda	+ 21' 10"

Final general classification (11–85)
Rank	Rider	Team	Time
11	Robert Alban (FRA)	La Redoute–Motobécane	+ 22' 41"
12	Johan van der Velde (NED)	TI–Raleigh–Creda	+ 25' 28"
13	Claude Criquielion (BEL)	Splendor–Admiral	+ 27' 43"
14	Jostein Wilmann (NOR)	Puch–Sem–Campagnolo	+ 28' 04"
15	Régis Ovion (FRA)	Puch–Sem–Campagnolo	+ 29' 48"
16	Lucien Van Impe (BEL)	Marc–IWC–V.R.D.	+ 32' 55"
17	Bernard Thévenet (FRA)	Teka	+ 32' 59"
18	Ludo Loos (BEL)	Marc–IWC–V.R.D.	+ 36' 36"
19	Jo Maas (NED)	DAF Trucks–Lejeune	+ 36' 44"
20	Vicente Belda (ESP)	Kelme–Gios	+ 42' 42"
21	Patrick Busolini (FRA)	Puch–Sem–Campagnolo	+ 45' 35"
22	Géry Verlinden (BEL)	IJsboerke–Warncke Eis	+ 52' 17"
23	Ferdinand Julien (FRA)	Boston–Mavic–Amis du Tour	+ 52' 37"
24	Ismael Lejarreta (ESP)	Teka	+ 54' 05"
25	Alberto Fernández (ESP)	Teka	+ 55' 17"
26	Eddy Schepers (BEL)	DAF Trucks–Lejeune	+ 55' 32"
27	Daniel Plummer (BEL)	Splendor–Admiral	+ 58' 46"
28	Pascal Simon (FRA)	Peugeot–Esso–Michelin	+ 58' 51"
29	Sean Kelly (IRE)	Splendor–Admiral	+ 58' 54"
30	René Martens (BEL)	DAF Trucks–Lejeune	+ 59' 06"
31	Bernard Vallet (FRA)	La Redoute–Motobécane	+ 59' 11"
32	Mariano Martínez (FRA)	La Redoute–Motobécane	+ 1h 01' 06"
33	Jean-Luc Vandenbroucke (BEL)	La Redoute–Motobécane	+ 1h 01' 30"
34	Patrick Bonnet (FRA)	Renault–Gitane	+ 1h 01' 38"
35	Pedro Torres (ESP)	Kelme–Gios	+ 1h 02' 25"
36	Bert Oosterbosch (NED)	TI–Raleigh–Creda	+ 1h 02' 59"
37	Klaus-Peter Thaler (FRG)	Teka	+ 1h 05' 03"
38	Gerrie Knetemann (NED)	TI–Raleigh–Creda	+ 1h 06' 23"
39	Guido Van Calster (BEL)	Splendor–Admiral	+ 1h 06' 46"
40	Bernard Bourreau (FRA)	Peugeot–Esso–Michelin	+ 1h 07' 11"
41	Marco Chagas (POR)	Puch–Sem–Campagnolo	+ 1h 07' 34"
42	Rudy Pevenage (BEL)	IJsboerke–Warncke Eis	+ 1h 08' 02"
43	Patrick Friou (FRA)	Miko–Mercier–Vivagel	+ 1h 09' 34"
44	Christian Levavasseur (FRA)	Miko–Mercier–Vivagel	+ 1h 11' 18"
45	Didier Vanoverschelde (FRA)	La Redoute–Motobécane	+ 1h 11' 32"
46	Hubert Linard (FRA)	Peugeot–Esso–Michelin	+ 1h 11' 52"
47	Ludo Delcroix (BEL)	IJsboerke–Warncke Eis	+ 1h 16' 14"
48	Jean-Raymond Toso (FRA)	Puch–Sem–Campagnolo	+ 1h 19' 20"
49	Graham Jones (GBR)	Peugeot–Esso–Michelin	+ 1h 20' 33"
50	Jean-Louis Gauthier (FRA)	Miko–Mercier–Vivagel	+ 1h 20' 58"
51	Leo van Vliet (NED)	TI–Raleigh–Creda	+ 1h 21' 38"
52	Joseph Borguet (BEL)	Splendor–Admiral	+ 1h 22' 02"
53	Ferdi Van Den Haute (BEL)	La Redoute–Motobécane	+ 1h 22' 25"
54	José Luis Mayoz (ESP)	Teka	+ 1h 22' 41"
55	Patrice Thevenard (FRA)	Boston–Mavic–Amis du Tour	+ 1h 23' 47"
56	Paul Wellens (BEL)	TI–Raleigh–Creda	+ 1h 23' 53"
57	Bernardo Alfonsel (ESP)	Teka	+ 1h 25' 10"
58	Alain Vigneron (FRA)	Boston–Mavic–Amis du Tour	+ 1h 25' 23"
59	Jacques Bossis (FRA)	Peugeot–Esso–Michelin	+ 1h 25' 30"
60	Jos Jacobs (BEL)	IJsboerke–Warncke Eis	+ 1h 25' 44"
61	Didier Lebaud (FRA)	Miko–Mercier–Vivagel	+ 1h 26' 44"
62	Hans-Peter Jakst (FRG)	Puch–Sem–Campagnolo	+ 1h 27' 59"
63	Hendrik Devos (BEL)	DAF Trucks–Lejeune	+ 1h 28' 49"
64	Marcel Laurens (BEL)	Marc–IWC–V.R.D.	+ 1h 29' 36"
65	Pol Verschuere (BEL)	IJsboerke–Warncke Eis	+ 1h 30' 05"
66	Jos De Schoenmaecker (BEL)	Marc–IWC–V.R.D.	+ 1h 31' 03"
67	Dirk Wayenberg (BEL)	IJsboerke–Warncke Eis	+ 1h 31' 07"
68	Ludwig Wijnants (BEL)	IJsboerke–Warncke Eis	+ 1h 31' 09"
69	Jan Jonkers (NED)	Boston–Mavic–Amis du Tour	+ 1h 32' 36"
70	Pierre-Raymond Villemiane (FRA)	Renault–Gitane	+ 1h 32' 59"
71	Patrick Perret (FRA)	Peugeot–Esso–Michelin	+ 1h 38' 11"
72	Jacques Michaud (FRA)	Puch–Sem–Campagnolo	+ 1h 41' 36"
73	Eric Van de Wiele (BEL)	IJsboerke–Warncke Eis	+ 1h 41' 38"
74	Jean Chassang (FRA)	Renault–Gitane	+ 1h 44' 34"
75	Frédéric Brun (FRA)	Peugeot–Esso–Michelin	+ 1h 44' 51"
76	Bernard Becaas (FRA)	Renault–Gitane	+ 1h 45' 09"
77	Joël Gallopin (FRA)	Miko–Mercier–Vivagel	+ 1h 46' 12"
78	Herman Beysens (BEL)	Splendor–Admiral	+ 1h 48' 19"
79	Patrick Pevenage (BEL)	DAF Trucks–Lejeune	+ 1h 49' 54"
80	Jordi (Jorge) Fortia (ESP)	Kelme–Gios	+ 1h 52' 22"
81	Maurice Le Guilloux (FRA)	Renault–Gitane	+ 1h 53' 09"
82	William Tackaert (BEL)	DAF Trucks–Lejeune	+ 1h 57' 08"
83	Jos 'Adri' Schipper (NED)	Marc–IWC–V.R.D.	+ 1h 59' 29"
84	Roger Legeay (FRA)	Peugeot–Esso–Michelin	+ 1h 59' 40"
85	Gerhard Schönbacher (AUT)	Marc–IWC–V.R.D.	+ 2h 10' 52"

=== Points classification ===
Final points classification (1–10)
Rank	Rider	Team	Points
1	Rudy Pevenage (BEL)	IJsboerke–Warncke Eis	194
2	Sean Kelly (IRE)	Splendor–Admiral	153
3	Ludo Peeters (BEL)	IJsboerke–Warncke Eis	148
4	Jos Jacobs (BEL)	IJsboerke–Warncke Eis	122
5	Leo van Vliet (NED)	TI–Raleigh–Creda	120
6	Pierre Bazzo (FRA)	La Redoute–Motobécane	111
7	Guido Van Calster (BEL)	Splendor–Admiral	89
8	Klaus-Peter Thaler (FRG)	Teka	86
9	William Tackaert (BEL)	DAF Trucks–Lejeune	81
10	Joop Zoetemelk (NED)	TI–Raleigh–Creda	80

=== Mountains classification ===
Final mountains classification (1–10)
Rank	Rider	Team	Points
1	Raymond Martin (FRA)	Miko–Mercier–Vivagel	223
2	Ludo Loos (BEL)	Marc–IWC–V.R.D.	162
3	Ludo Peeters (BEL)	IJsboerke–Warncke Eis	147
4	Sven-Åke Nilsson (SWE)	Miko–Mercier–Vivagel	145
5	Joop Zoetemelk (NED)	TI–Raleigh–Creda	137
6	Jostein Wilmann (NOR)	Puch–Sem–Campagnolo	116
7	Vicente Belda (ESP)	Kelme–Gios	99
8	Lucien Van Impe (BEL)	Marc–IWC–V.R.D.	97
9	Robert Alban (FRA)	La Redoute–Motobécane	86
10	Joaquim Agostinho (POR)	Puch–Sem–Campagnolo	81

=== Young rider classification ===
Final young rider classification (1–10)
Rank	Rider	Team	Time
1	Johan van der Velde (NED)	TI–Raleigh–Creda	109h 44' 42"
2	Claude Criquielion (BEL)	Splendor–Admiral	+2' 15"
3	Daniel Plummer (BEL)	Splendor–Admiral	+33' 18"
4	Pascal Simon (FRA)	Peugeot–Esso–Michelin	+ 33' 23"
5	Sean Kelly (IRE)	Splendor–Admiral	+ 33' 26"
6	Patrick Bonnet (FRA)	Renault–Gitane	+ 36' 10"
7	Bert Oosterbosch (NED)	TI–Raleigh–Creda	+ 37' 31"
8	Guido Van Calster (BEL)	Splendor–Admiral	+ 41' 18"
9	Marco Chagas (POR)	Puch–Sem–Campagnolo	+ 42' 06"
10	Christian Levavasseur (FRA)	Miko–Mercier–Vivagel	+ 45' 50"

=== Combination classification ===
Final combination classification (1–10)
Rank	Rider	Team	Points
1	Ludo Peeters (BEL)	IJsboerke–Warncke Eis	317
2	Raymond Martin (FRA)	Miko–Mercier–Vivagel	263
3	Joop Zoetemelk (NED)	TI–Raleigh–Creda	218
4	Rudy Pevenage (BEL)	IJsboerke–Warncke Eis	205
5	Sean Kelly (IRE)	Splendor–Admiral	173
6	Ludo Loos (BEL)	Marc–IWC–V.R.D.	169
7	Pierre Bazzo (FRA)	La Redoute–Motobécane	157
8	Sven-Åke Nilsson (SWE)	Miko–Mercier–Vivagel	149
9	Hennie Kuiper (NED)	Peugeot–Esso–Michelin	132
10	Christian Seznec (FRA)	Miko–Mercier–Vivagel	129

=== Intermediate sprints classification ===
Final intermediate sprints classification (1–10)
Rank	Rider	Team	Points
1	Rudy Pevenage (BEL)	IJsboerke–Warncke Eis	79
2	Jean-Louis Gauthier (FRA)	Miko–Mercier–Vivagel	45
3	Ludo Peeters (BEL)	IJsboerke–Warncke Eis	31
4	Pierre Bazzo (FRA)	La Redoute–Motobécane	28
5	Patrick Pevenage (BEL)	DAF Trucks–Lejeune	22
6	William Tackaert (BEL)	DAF Trucks–Lejeune	21
7	Ferdi Van Den Haute (BEL)	La Redoute–Motobécane	19
8	Sean Kelly (IRE)	Splendor–Admiral	15
9	Bert Oosterbosch (NED)	TI–Raleigh–Creda	15
10	Pierre-Raymond Villemiane (FRA)	Renault–Gitane	14

=== Team classification ===
Final team classification (1–10)
Rank	Team	Time
1	Miko–Mercier–Vivagel	450h 25' 36"
2	TI–Raleigh–Creda	+ 6' 02"
3	Puch–Sem–Campagnolo	+ 20' 35"
4	Splendor–Admiral	+ 50' 20"
5	La Redoute–Motobécane	+ 55' 37"
6	IJsboerke–Warncke Eis	+ 1h 08' 13"
7	Peugeot–Esso–Michelin	+1h 17' 14"
8	DAF Trucks–Lejeune	+2h 09' 39"
9	Teka	+2h 18' 49"
10	Renault–Gitane	+2h 25' 29"

=== Team points classification ===
Final team points classification (1–10)
Rank	Team	Points
1	TI–Raleigh–Creda	1020
2	IJsboerke–Warncke Eis	1133
3	La Redoute–Motobécane	1291
4	Miko–Mercier–Vivagel	1624
5	Peugeot–Esso–Michelin	1680
6	Splendor–Admiral	1753
7	Renault–Gitane	1917
8	DAF Trucks–Lejeune	2022
9	Puch–Sem–Campagnolo	2315
10	Boston–Mavic–Amis du Tour	2772

== Aftermath ==
After it was said that Zoetemelk only won because Hinault abandoned, Zoetemelk replied "Surely winning the Tour is a question of health and robustness? If Hinault does not have that health and robustness and I have, that makes me a valid winner." Hinault agreed to that, saying that it was the absent rider (Hinault) who is at fault, not the one who replaces him.

In the individual time trial prior to the start of the mountain stages Zoetemelk dominated Hinault to come within 21 seconds of the overall lead. While Hinault was rarely beaten in any individual time trial, it was common knowledge that Zoetemelk was probably the best mountain climber in the world and with the mountain stages about to begin it is unlikely Hinault's lead of 21 seconds would have held.

Hinault's knee problems were solved before the 1980 UCI Road World Championships, which he won.

== Bibliography ==
- Augendre, Jacques (2016). Guide historique [Historical guide] (PDF) (in French). Paris: Amaury Sport Organisation. Archived (PDF) from the original on 17 August 2016.
- Martin, Pierre; Penazzo, Sergio (1980). Tour 80: The Stories of the 1980 Tour of Italy and Tour de France. Keighley, UK: Kennedy Brothers Publishing.
- McGann, Bill; McGann, Carol (2008). The Story of the Tour de France: 1965–2007. Vol. 2. Indianapolis: Dog Ear Publishing. ISBN 978-1-59858-608-4.
- Nauright, John; Parrish, Charles (2012). Sports Around the World: History, Culture, and Practice. Vol. 2. Santa Barbara, California: ABC-CLIO. ISBN 978-1-59884-300-2.
- van den Akker, Pieter (2018). Tour de France Rules and Statistics: 1903–2018. Self-published. ISBN 978-1-79398-080-9.
