= Ludo Loos =

Belgian cyclist (1955–2019)

- Loos during the 1980 Tour de France

Personal information
- Full name: Ludo Loos
- Born: 13 January 1955 Essen, Belgium
- Died: 1 March 2019 (aged 64) Brasschaat, Belgium

Cycling career
- Sport: Cycling
- Discipline: Road
- Role: Rider

Professional teams
- 1976–1977: EBO
- 1978: C&A
- 1979: Splendor–Eurosoap
- 1980: Marc–IWC–V.R.D.
- 1981: Kotter
- 1982: Fangio–Assos–OM Trucks–Iveco
- 1983: Perlav
- 1984–1986: Dormillon

Major wins
- Tour de France 1 individual stage (1980)

Ludo Loos (13 January 1955 – 1 March 2019) was a Belgian professional road bicycle racer.

== Career ==
During the 1980 Tour de France Loos was able to escape in a solo breakaway during Stage 18, which was a major mountain stage. He was the first rider over all five climbs and won the stage finishing 5:19 ahead of the group of favorites which included his teammate Lucien Van Impe, Robert Alban, Joaquim Agostinho and eventual yellow jersey winner Joop Zoetemelk. Loos would finish eighteenth in that year's general classification and second in the mountains classification.

In the 1985 Vuelta a España, Loos collided with a dog in O Portádego (Culleredo, province of A Coruña), and broke a neck vertebra. This effectively ended his career as cyclist.

On 1 March 2019, Loos died following a long illness.

== Major results ==
1973
2nd Belgian Junior Pursuit Championship
1976
Vuelta a España

2nd Overall Mountains classification

6th Overall Volta a la Comunitat Valenciana
9th Omloop van Midden-Vlaanderen
1977
Vuelta a España

3rd Overall Mountains classification

9th Brabantse Pijl
1978
Grand Prix du Midi Libre

3rd Overall
1st Points classification

1980
Tour de France:

Winner stage 18

1984
9th Subida al Naranco
1985
5th Overall Vuelta a Murcia
