= List of teams and cyclists in the 1977 Tour de France =

List of cyclists

For the 1977 Tour de France, to ride the Tour, teams had to pay money. The other Grand Tours, the Giro and the Vuelta, paid the teams money to start. For financial reasons, some teams chose to avoid the Tour, and only 100 cyclists started the race, divided in ten teams of ten cyclists each. One of the notable absentees was Michel Pollentier. The ten teams that did start the Tour were:

- Lejeune–BP
- Miko–Mercier–Hutchinson
- Peugeot–Esso–Michelin
- Kas–Campagnolo
- Frisol–Gazelle–Thirion
- Gitane–Campagnolo
- Teka
- Fiat
- Raleigh
- Bianchi–Campagnolo

Bernard Thévenet, the winner of 1975, was considered the main favourite, because the course of the race was considered suited to his talents. In March 1977, Thévenet had been penalized for a positive doping test in Paris–Nice.

The winner of the 1976 edition, Lucien Van Impe, was specialized in climbing, so his chances in the 1977 edition with less mountains were slimmer. Two other contenders were teammates Raymond Delisle and Joop Zoetemelk, fourth and second in the 1976 edition. Hennie Kuiper, the reigning world champion, was also a favourite.

Five-time winner Eddy Merckx was also competing, and was still considered an outsider for the victory, but he was no longer as dominant as before.

== Start list ==
=== By team ===
Lejeune–BP
No.	Rider	Pos.
1	Lucien Van Impe (BEL)	3
2	Pierre Bazzo (FRA)	DNF
3	Ferdinand Bracke (BEL)	DNF
4	René Dillen (BEL)	DNF
5	Antoine Gutierrez (FRA)	DNF
6	Ferdinand Julien (FRA)	21
7	Michel Le Denmat (FRA)	43
8	Roger Legeay (FRA)	37
9	Eugène Plet (FRA)	36
10	Roy Schuiten (NED)	DNF

Miko–Mercier–Hutchinson
No.	Rider	Pos.
11	Joop Zoetemelk (NED)	8
12	Yvon Bertin (FRA)	DNF
13	Raymond Delisle (FRA)	9
14	Barry Hoban (GBR)	41
15	Maurice Le Guilloux (FRA)	DNF
16	Raymond Martin (FRA)	11
17	Patrick Perret (FRA)	DNF
18	Charles Rouxel (FRA)	DNF
19	Christian Seznec (FRA)	22
20	Bernard Vallet (FRA)	20

Peugeot–Esso–Michelin
No.	Rider	Pos.
21	Bernard Thévenet (FRA)	1
22	Patrick Béon (FRA)	DNF
23	Bernard Bourreau (FRA)	34
24	Jean-Pierre Danguillaume (FRA)	35
25	Régis Delépine (FRA)	DNF
26	Jacques Esclassan (FRA)	27
27	Michel Laurent (FRA)	7
28	Régis Ovion (FRA)	24
29	Guy Sibille (FRA)	40
30	Georges Talbourdet (FRA)	DNF

Kas–Campagnolo
No.	Rider	Pos.
31	Francisco Galdós (ESP)	4
32	Julián Andiano (ESP)	DNF
33	José Enrique Cima (ESP)	33
34	Vicente López Carril (ESP)	23
35	Enrique Martínez Heredia (ESP)	18
36	José Martins (POR)	16
37	Antonio Menéndez (ESP)	45
38	José Nazabal (ESP)	DNF
39	José Pesarrodona (ESP)	DNF
40	Sebastián Pozo (ESP)	DNF

Frisol–Gazelle–Thirion
No.	Rider	Pos.
41	Luis Ocaña (ESP)	25
42	Fedor den Hertog (NED)	DNF
43	Roger Loysch (BEL)	52
44	Jan Raas (NED)	DNF
45	André Romero (FRA)	DNF
46	Roger Rosiers (BEL)	DNF
47	Benny Schepmans (BEL)	DNF
48	Theo Smit (NED)	DNF
49	Paul Wellens (BEL)	30
50	Wilfried Wesemael (BEL)	DNF

Gitane–Campagnolo
No.	Rider	Pos.
51	Alain Meslet (FRA)	10
52	Jacques Bossis (FRA)	DNF
53	Roland Berland (FRA)	32
54	André Chalmel (FRA)	42
55	Jean Chassang (FRA)	DNF
56	Robert Mintkiewicz (FRA)	DNF
57	Gérard Moneyron (FRA)	DNF
58	Bernard Quilfen (FRA)	DNF
59	Willy Teirlinck (BEL)	DNF
60	Pierre-Raymond Villemiane (FRA)	15

Teka
No.	Rider	Pos.
61	Pedro Torres (ESP)	19
62	Gonzalo Aja (ESP)	14
63	Joaquim Agostinho (POR)	13
64	Bernardo Alfonsel (ESP)	DNF
65	Luis Balagué (ESP)	50
66	Manuel Esparza (ESP)	DNF
67	Andrés Gandarias (ESP)	44
68	Carlos Melero (ESP)	DNF
69	Fernando Mendes (POR)	28
70	Klaus-Peter Thaler (FRG)	DNF

Fiat
No.	Rider	Pos.
71	Eddy Merckx (BEL)	6
72	Cees Bal (NED)	51
73	Robert Bouloux (FRA)	49
74	Joseph Bruyère (BEL)	DNF
75	Ludo Delcroix (BEL)	DNF
76	Jos Deschoenmaecker (BEL)	29
77	Jos Huysmans (BEL)	47
78	Edward Janssens (BEL)	17
79	Jean-Luc Molinéris (FRA)	DNF
80	Patrick Sercu (BEL)	DNF

Raleigh
No.	Rider	Pos.
81	Hennie Kuiper (NED)	2
82	José De Cauwer (BEL)	46
83	Gerben Karstens (NED)	53
84	Gerrie Knetemann (NED)	31
85	Henk Lubberding (NED)	26
86	Bill Nickson (GBR)	DNF
87	Bert Pronk (NED)	12
88	Dietrich Thurau (FRG)	5
89	Aad van den Hoek (NED)	DNF
90	Piet van Katwijk (NED)	DNF

Bianchi–Campagnolo
No.	Rider	Pos.
91	Rik Van Linden (BEL)	DNF
92	Luigi Castelletti (ITA)	DNF
93	Giovanni Cavalcanti (ITA)	38
94	Willy In 't Ven (BEL)	DNF
95	Sergio Parsani (ITA)	DNF
96	Jullio Rossi (ITA)	DNF
97	Giacinto Santambrogio (ITA)	39
98	Glauco Santoni (ITA)	DNF
99	Willy Singer (FRG)	48
100	Alex Van Linden (BEL)	DNF

=== By rider ===
Legend
No.	Starting number worn by the rider during the Tour
Pos.	Position in the general classification
DNF	Denotes a rider who did not finish

No.	Name	Nationality	Team	Pos.	Ref
1	Lucien Van Impe	Belgium	Lejeune–BP	3	
2	Pierre Bazzo	France	Lejeune–BP	DNF	
3	Ferdinand Bracke	Belgium	Lejeune–BP	DNF	
4	René Dillen	Belgium	Lejeune–BP	DNF	
5	Antoine Gutierrez	France	Lejeune–BP	DNF	
6	Ferdinand Julien	France	Lejeune–BP	21	
7	Michel Le Denmat	France	Lejeune–BP	43	
8	Roger Legeay	France	Lejeune–BP	37	
9	Eugène Plet	France	Lejeune–BP	36	
10	Roy Schuiten	Netherlands	Lejeune–BP	DNF	
11	Joop Zoetemelk	Netherlands	Miko–Mercier–Hutchinson	8	
12	Yvon Bertin	France	Miko–Mercier–Hutchinson	DNF	
13	Raymond Delisle	France	Miko–Mercier–Hutchinson	9	
14	Barry Hoban	Great Britain	Miko–Mercier–Hutchinson	41	
15	Maurice Le Guilloux	France	Miko–Mercier–Hutchinson	DNF	
16	Raymond Martin	France	Miko–Mercier–Hutchinson	11	
17	Patrick Perret	France	Miko–Mercier–Hutchinson	DNF	
18	Charles Rouxel	France	Miko–Mercier–Hutchinson	DNF	
19	Christian Seznec	France	Miko–Mercier–Hutchinson	22	
20	Bernard Vallet	France	Miko–Mercier–Hutchinson	20	
21	Bernard Thévenet	France	Peugeot–Esso–Michelin	1	
22	Patrick Béon	France	Peugeot–Esso–Michelin	DNF	
23	Bernard Bourreau	France	Peugeot–Esso–Michelin	34	
24	Jean-Pierre Danguillaume	France	Peugeot–Esso–Michelin	35	
25	Régis Delépine	France	Peugeot–Esso–Michelin	DNF	
26	Jacques Esclassan	France	Peugeot–Esso–Michelin	27	
27	Michel Laurent	France	Peugeot–Esso–Michelin	7	
28	Régis Ovion	France	Peugeot–Esso–Michelin	24	
29	Guy Sibille	France	Peugeot–Esso–Michelin	40	
30	Georges Talbourdet	France	Peugeot–Esso–Michelin	DNF	
31	Francisco Galdós	Spain	Kas–Campagnolo	4	
32	Julián Andiano	Spain	Kas–Campagnolo	DNF	
33	José Enrique Cima	Spain	Kas–Campagnolo	33	
34	Vicente López Carril	Spain	Kas–Campagnolo	23	
35	Enrique Martínez Heredia	Spain	Kas–Campagnolo	18	
36	José Martins	Portugal	Kas–Campagnolo	16	
37	Antonio Menéndez	Spain	Kas–Campagnolo	45	
38	José Nazabal	Spain	Kas–Campagnolo	DNF	
39	José Pesarrodona	Spain	Kas–Campagnolo	DNF	
40	Sebastián Pozo	Spain	Kas–Campagnolo	DNF	
41	Luis Ocaña	Spain	Frisol–Gazelle–Thirion	25	
42	Fedor den Hertog	Netherlands	Frisol–Gazelle–Thirion	DNF	
43	Roger Loysch	Belgium	Frisol–Gazelle–Thirion	52	
44	Jan Raas	Netherlands	Frisol–Gazelle–Thirion	DNF	
45	André Romero	France	Frisol–Gazelle–Thirion	DNF	
46	Roger Rosiers	Belgium	Frisol–Gazelle–Thirion	DNF	
47	Benny Schepmans	Belgium	Frisol–Gazelle–Thirion	DNF	
48	Theo Smit	Netherlands	Frisol–Gazelle–Thirion	DNF	
49	Paul Wellens	Belgium	Frisol–Gazelle–Thirion	30	
50	Wilfried Wesemael	Belgium	Frisol–Gazelle–Thirion	DNF	
51	Alain Meslet	France	Gitane–Campagnolo	10	
52	Jacques Bossis	France	Gitane–Campagnolo	DNF	
53	Roland Berland	France	Gitane–Campagnolo	32	
54	André Chalmel	France	Gitane–Campagnolo	42	
55	Jean Chassang	France	Gitane–Campagnolo	DNF	
56	Robert Mintkiewicz	France	Gitane–Campagnolo	DNF	
57	Gérard Moneyron	France	Gitane–Campagnolo	DNF	
58	Bernard Quilfen	France	Gitane–Campagnolo	DNF	
59	Willy Teirlinck	Belgium	Gitane–Campagnolo	DNF	
60	Pierre-Raymond Villemiane	France	Gitane–Campagnolo	15	
61	Pedro Torres	Spain	Teka	19	
62	Gonzalo Aja	Spain	Teka	14	
63	Joaquim Agostinho	Portugal	Teka	13	
64	Bernardo Alfonsel	Spain	Teka	DNF	
65	Luis Balagué	Spain	Teka	50	
66	Manuel Esparza	Spain	Teka	DNF	
67	Andrés Gandarias	Spain	Teka	44	
68	Carlos Melero	Spain	Teka	DNF	
69	Fernando Mendes	Portugal	Teka	28	
70	Klaus-Peter Thaler	West Germany	Teka	DNF	
71	Eddy Merckx	Belgium	Fiat	6	
72	Cees Bal	Netherlands	Fiat	51	
73	Robert Bouloux	France	Fiat	49	
74	Joseph Bruyère	Belgium	Fiat	DNF	
75	Ludo Delcroix	Belgium	Fiat	DNF	
76	Jos Deschoenmaecker	Belgium	Fiat	29	
77	Jos Huysmans	Belgium	Fiat	47	
78	Edward Janssens	Belgium	Fiat	17	
79	Jean-Luc Molinéris	France	Fiat	DNF	
80	Patrick Sercu	Belgium	Fiat	DNF	
81	Hennie Kuiper	Netherlands	Raleigh	2	
82	José De Cauwer	Belgium	Raleigh	46	
83	Gerben Karstens	Netherlands	Raleigh	53	
84	Gerrie Knetemann	Netherlands	Raleigh	31	
85	Henk Lubberding	Netherlands	Raleigh	26	
86	Bill Nickson	Great Britain	Raleigh	DNF	
87	Bert Pronk	Netherlands	Raleigh	12	
88	Dietrich Thurau	West Germany	Raleigh	5	
89	Aad van den Hoek	Netherlands	Raleigh	DNF	
90	Piet van Katwijk	Netherlands	Raleigh	DNF	
91	Rik Van Linden	Belgium	Bianchi–Campagnolo	DNF	
92	Luigi Castelletti	Italy	Bianchi–Campagnolo	DNF	
93	Giovanni Cavalcanti	Italy	Bianchi–Campagnolo	38	
94	Willy In 't Ven	Belgium	Bianchi–Campagnolo	DNF	
95	Sergio Parsani	Italy	Bianchi–Campagnolo	DNF	
96	Jullio Rossi	Italy	Bianchi–Campagnolo	DNF	
97	Giacinto Santambrogio	Italy	Bianchi–Campagnolo	39	
98	Glauco Santoni	Italy	Bianchi–Campagnolo	DNF	
99	Willy Singer	West Germany	Bianchi–Campagnolo	48	
100	Alex Van Linden	Belgium	Bianchi–Campagnolo	DNF	
