= 1977 Tour de France, Prologue to Stage 11 =

Cycling race stages

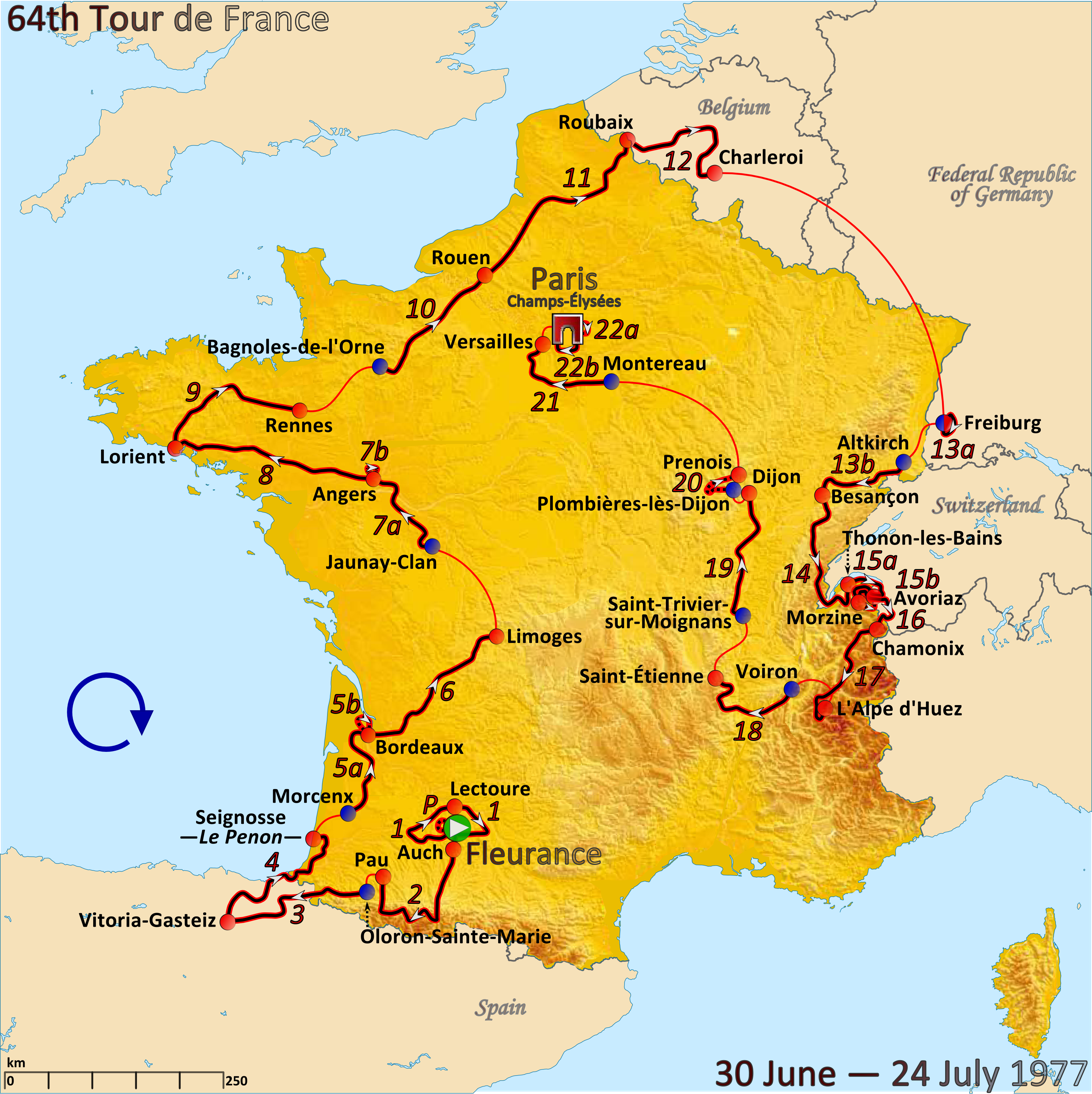
Route of the 1977 Tour de France

The 1977 Tour de France was the 64th edition of the Tour de France, one of cycling's Grand Tours. The Tour began in Fleurance with a prologue individual time trial on 30 June, and Stage 11 occurred on 12 July with a flat stage to Roubaix. The race finished in Paris on 24 July.

== Prologue ==
30 June 1977 – Fleurance to Fleurance, 5 km (3.1 mi) (ITT)

Prologue result and general classification after prologue

Rank	Rider	Team	Time
1	Dietrich Thurau (FRG)	Raleigh	6' 16"
2	Gerrie Knetemann (NED)	Raleigh	+ 4"
3	Eddy Merckx (BEL)	Fiat	+ 8"
4	Joaquim Agostinho (POR)	Teka	+ 11"
5	Joseph Bruyère (BEL)	Fiat	s.t.
6	Klaus-Peter Thaler (FRG)	Teka	+ 12"
7	Ferdinand Bracke (BEL)	Lejeune–BP	s.t.
8	Michel Laurent (FRA)	Peugeot–Esso–Michelin	+ 13"
9	Wilfried Wesemael (BEL)	Frisol–Gazelle–Thirion	s.t.
10	Lucien Van Impe (BEL)	Lejeune–BP	+ 14"

== Stage 1 ==
1 July 1977 – Fleurance to Auch, 237 km (147 mi)

Stage 1 result

Rank	Rider	Team	Time
1	Pierre-Raymond Villemiane (FRA)	Gitane–Campagnolo	7h 09' 01"
2	Jacques Esclassan (FRA)	Peugeot–Esso–Michelin	s.t.
3	Wilfried Wesemael (BEL)	Frisol–Gazelle–Thirion	s.t.
4	Rik Van Linden (BEL)	Bianchi–Campagnolo	s.t.
5	Klaus-Peter Thaler (FRG)	Teka	s.t.
6	Dietrich Thurau (FRG)	Raleigh	s.t.
7	André Chalmel (FRA)	Gitane–Campagnolo	s.t.
8	Eddy Merckx (BEL)	Fiat	s.t.
9	Régis Delépine (FRA)	Peugeot–Esso–Michelin	s.t.
10	Lucien Van Impe (BEL)	Lejeune–BP	s.t.

General classification after stage 1

Rank	Rider	Team	Time
1	Dietrich Thurau (FRG)	Raleigh	7h 15' 17"
2	Gerrie Knetemann (NED)	Raleigh	+ 4"
3	Eddy Merckx (BEL)	Fiat	+ 8"
4	Joseph Bruyère (BEL)	Fiat	+ 11"
5	Joaquim Agostinho (POR)	Teka	s.t.
6	Klaus-Peter Thaler (FRG)	Teka	+ 12"
7	Wilfried Wesemael (BEL)	Frisol–Gazelle–Thirion	+ 13"
8	Michel Laurent (FRA)	Peugeot–Esso–Michelin	s.t.
9	Lucien Van Impe (BEL)	Lejeune–BP	+ 14"
10	Charles Rouxel (FRA)	Miko–Mercier–Hutchinson	+ 16"

== Stage 2 ==
2 July 1977 – Auch to Pau, 253 km (157 mi)

Stage 2 result

Rank	Rider	Team	Time
1	Dietrich Thurau (FRG)	Raleigh	8h 11' 08"
2	Pierre-Raymond Villemiane (FRA)	Gitane–Campagnolo	s.t.
3	Eddy Merckx (BEL)	Fiat	s.t.
4	Charles Rouxel (FRA)	Miko–Mercier–Hutchinson	s.t.
5	Bernard Thévenet (FRA)	Peugeot–Esso–Michelin	s.t.
6	Lucien Van Impe (BEL)	Lejeune–BP	s.t.
7	Julián Andiano (ESP)	Kas–Campagnolo	s.t.
8	Gonzalo Aja (BEL)	Teka	s.t.
9	Francisco Galdós (ESP)	Kas–Campagnolo	s.t.
10	Hennie Kuiper (NED)	Raleigh	s.t.

General classification after stage 2

Rank	Rider	Team	Time
1	Dietrich Thurau (FRG)	Raleigh	15h 26' 25"
2	Eddy Merckx (BEL)	Fiat	+ 8"
3	Michel Laurent (FRA)	Peugeot–Esso–Michelin	+ 13"
4	Lucien Van Impe (BEL)	Lejeune–BP	+ 14"
5	Charles Rouxel (FRA)	Miko–Mercier–Hutchinson	+ 16"
6	Joop Zoetemelk (NED)	Miko–Mercier–Hutchinson	+ 18"
7	Bernard Thévenet (FRA)	Peugeot–Esso–Michelin	+ 19"
8	Pierre-Raymond Villemiane (FRA)	Gitane–Campagnolo	+ 31"
9	Hennie Kuiper (NED)	Raleigh	+ 32"
10	Alain Meslet (FRA)	Gitane–Campagnolo	s.t.

== Stage 3 ==
3 July 1977 – Oloron-Sainte-Marie to Vitoria-Gasteiz, 248 km (154 mi)

Stage 3 result

Rank	Rider	Team	Time
1	José Nazabal (ESP)	Kas–Campagnolo	7h 35' 30"
2	Rik Van Linden (BEL)	Bianchi–Campagnolo	+ 5' 15"
3	Patrick Sercu (BEL)	Fiat	s.t.
4	Jacques Esclassan (FRA)	Peugeot–Esso–Michelin	s.t.
5	Theo Smit (NED)	Frisol–Gazelle–Thirion	s.t.
6	Charles Rouxel (FRA)	Miko–Mercier–Hutchinson	s.t.
7	Klaus-Peter Thaler (FRG)	Teka	s.t.
8	Jan Raas (NED)	Frisol–Gazelle–Thirion	s.t.
9	Dietrich Thurau (FRG)	Raleigh	s.t.
10	Régis Delépine (FRA)	Peugeot–Esso–Michelin	s.t.

General classification after stage 3

Rank	Rider	Team	Time
1	Dietrich Thurau (FRG)	Raleigh	23h 07' 10"
2	Eddy Merckx (BEL)	Fiat	+ 8"
3	Michel Laurent (FRA)	Peugeot–Esso–Michelin	+ 13"
4	Lucien Van Impe (BEL)	Lejeune–BP	+ 14"
5	Joop Zoetemelk (NED)	Miko–Mercier–Hutchinson	+ 18"
6	Bernard Thévenet (FRA)	Peugeot–Esso–Michelin	+ 19"
7	Charles Rouxel (FRA)	Miko–Mercier–Hutchinson	+ 26"
8	Pierre-Raymond Villemiane (FRA)	Gitane–Campagnolo	+ 31"
9	Hennie Kuiper (NED)	Raleigh	+ 32"
10	Alain Meslet (FRA)	Gitane–Campagnolo	s.t.

== Stage 4 ==
4 July 1977 – Vitoria-Gasteiz to Seignosse le Penon, 256 km (159 mi)

Stage 4 result

Rank	Rider	Team	Time
1	Régis Delépine (FRA)	Peugeot–Esso–Michelin	7h 35' 49"
2	José De Cauwer (BEL)	Raleigh	s.t.
3	Luigi Castelletti (ITA)	Bianchi–Campagnolo	s.t.
4	Roland Berland (FRA)	Gitane–Campagnolo	s.t.
5	Roger Legeay (FRA)	Lejeune–BP	s.t.
6	Fernando Mendes (POR)	Teka	s.t.
7	Edward Janssens (BEL)	Fiat	+ 5"
8	Patrick Perret (FRA)	Miko–Mercier–Hutchinson	+ 2' 20"
9	Jacques Esclassan (FRA)	Peugeot–Esso–Michelin	+ 3' 52"
10	Rik Van Linden (BEL)	Bianchi–Campagnolo	s.t.

General classification after stage 4

Rank	Rider	Team	Time
1	Dietrich Thurau (FRG)	Raleigh	30h 46' 51"
2	Eddy Merckx (BEL)	Fiat	+ 8"
3	Michel Laurent (FRA)	Peugeot–Esso–Michelin	+ 13"
4	Lucien Van Impe (BEL)	Lejeune–BP	+ 14"
5	Joop Zoetemelk (NED)	Miko–Mercier–Hutchinson	+ 18"
6	Bernard Thévenet (FRA)	Peugeot–Esso–Michelin	+ 19"
7	Charles Rouxel (FRA)	Miko–Mercier–Hutchinson	+ 26"
8	Pierre-Raymond Villemiane (FRA)	Gitane–Campagnolo	+ 31"
9	Hennie Kuiper (NED)	Raleigh	+ 32"
10	Alain Meslet (FRA)	Gitane–Campagnolo	s.t.

== Stage 5a ==
5 July 1977 – Morcenx to Bordeaux, 139 km (86 mi)

Stage 5a result

Rank	Rider	Team	Time
1	Jacques Esclassan (FRA)	Peugeot–Esso–Michelin	3h 38' 05"
2	Gerben Karstens (NED)	Raleigh	s.t.
3	Patrick Sercu (BEL)	Fiat	s.t.
4	Rik Van Linden (BEL)	Bianchi–Campagnolo	s.t.
5	Barry Hoban (GBR)	Miko–Mercier–Hutchinson	s.t.
6	Klaus-Peter Thaler (FRG)	Teka	s.t.
7	Theo Smit (NED)	Frisol–Gazelle–Thirion	s.t.
8	Piet van Katwijk (NED)	Raleigh	s.t.
9	Charles Rouxel (FRA)	Miko–Mercier–Hutchinson	s.t.
10	Willy Teirlinck (BEL)	Gitane–Campagnolo	s.t.

General classification after stage 5a

Rank	Rider	Team	Time
1	Dietrich Thurau (FRG)	Raleigh	34h 24' 56"
2	Eddy Merckx (BEL)	Fiat	+ 8"
3	Michel Laurent (FRA)	Peugeot–Esso–Michelin	+ 13"
4	Lucien Van Impe (BEL)	Lejeune–BP	+ 14"
5	Joop Zoetemelk (NED)	Miko–Mercier–Hutchinson	+ 18"
6	Bernard Thévenet (FRA)	Peugeot–Esso–Michelin	+ 19"
7	Charles Rouxel (FRA)	Miko–Mercier–Hutchinson	+ 26"
8	Pierre-Raymond Villemiane (FRA)	Gitane–Campagnolo	+ 28"
9	Hennie Kuiper (NED)	Raleigh	+ 32"
10	Alain Meslet (FRA)	Gitane–Campagnolo	s.t.

== Stage 5b ==
5 July 1977 – Bordeaux to Bordeaux, 30 km (19 mi) (ITT)

Stage 5b result

Rank	Rider	Team	Time
1	Dietrich Thurau (FRG)	Raleigh	39' 24"
2	Eddy Merckx (BEL)	Fiat	+ 50"
3	Gerrie Knetemann (NED)	Raleigh	+ 1' 05"
4	Bernard Thévenet (FRA)	Peugeot–Esso–Michelin	+ 1' 06"
5	Joseph Bruyère (BEL)	Fiat	+ 1' 09"
6	Hennie Kuiper (NED)	Raleigh	+ 1' 17"
7	Michel Laurent (FRA)	Peugeot–Esso–Michelin	+ 1' 21"
8	Fedor den Hertog (NED)	Frisol–Gazelle–Thirion	+ 1' 26"
9	Roy Schuiten (NED)	Lejeune–BP	+ 1' 30"
10	Alain Meslet (FRA)	Gitane–Campagnolo	+ 1' 34"

General classification after stage 5b

Rank	Rider	Team	Time
1	Dietrich Thurau (FRG)	Raleigh	35h 04' 20"
2	Eddy Merckx (BEL)	Fiat	+ 58"
3	Bernard Thévenet (FRA)	Peugeot–Esso–Michelin	+ 1' 25"
4	Michel Laurent (FRA)	Peugeot–Esso–Michelin	+ 1' 34"
5	Hennie Kuiper (NED)	Raleigh	+ 1' 49"
6	Alain Meslet (FRA)	Gitane–Campagnolo	+ 2' 06"
7	Joop Zoetemelk (NED)	Miko–Mercier–Hutchinson	+ 2' 07"
8	Lucien Van Impe (BEL)	Lejeune–BP	+ 2' 12"
9	Raymond Delisle (FRA)	Miko–Mercier–Hutchinson	+ 2' 32"
10	Pierre-Raymond Villemiane (FRA)	Gitane–Campagnolo	+ 2' 47"

== Rest day 1 ==
6 July 1977 – Bordeaux

== Stage 6 ==
7 July 1977 – Bordeaux to Limoges, 225 km (140 mi)

Stage 6 result

Rank	Rider	Team	Time
1	Jan Raas (NED)	Frisol–Gazelle–Thirion	6h 00' 40"
2	Klaus-Peter Thaler (FRG)	Teka	+ 10"
3	Giacinto Santambrogio (ITA)	Bianchi–Campagnolo	s.t.
4	Hennie Kuiper (NED)	Raleigh	s.t.
5	Jacques Bossis (FRA)	Gitane–Campagnolo	s.t.
6	Joaquim Agostinho (POR)	Teka	s.t.
7	Régis Ovion (FRA)	Peugeot–Esso–Michelin	s.t.
8	Wilfried Wesemael (BEL)	Frisol–Gazelle–Thirion	s.t.
9	Francisco Galdós (ESP)	Kas–Campagnolo	s.t.
10	Bernard Vallet (FRA)	Miko–Mercier–Hutchinson	s.t.

General classification after stage 6

Rank	Rider	Team	Time
1	Dietrich Thurau (FRG)	Raleigh	41h 05' 19"
2	Eddy Merckx (BEL)	Fiat	+ 58"
3	Michel Laurent (FRA)	Peugeot–Esso–Michelin	+ 1' 25"
4	Bernard Thévenet (FRA)	Peugeot–Esso–Michelin	s.t.
5	Hennie Kuiper (NED)	Raleigh	+ 1' 40"
6	Alain Meslet (FRA)	Gitane–Campagnolo	+ 2' 06"
7	Joop Zoetemelk (NED)	Miko–Mercier–Hutchinson	+ 2' 07"
8	Lucien Van Impe (BEL)	Lejeune–BP	+ 2' 12"
9	Raymond Delisle (FRA)	Miko–Mercier–Hutchinson	+ 2' 32"
10	Pierre-Raymond Villemiane (FRA)	Gitane–Campagnolo	+ 2' 47"

== Stage 7a ==
8 July 1977 – Jaunay-Clan to Angers, 140 km (87 mi)

Stage 7a result

Rank	Rider	Team	Time
1	Patrick Sercu (BEL)	Fiat	3h 45' 24"
2	Theo Smit (NED)	Frisol–Gazelle–Thirion	s.t.
3	Klaus-Peter Thaler (FRG)	Teka	s.t.
4	Gerben Karstens (NED)	Raleigh	s.t.
5	Barry Hoban (GBR)	Miko–Mercier–Hutchinson	s.t.
6	Wilfried Wesemael (BEL)	Frisol–Gazelle–Thirion	s.t.
7	Rik Van Linden (BEL)	Bianchi–Campagnolo	s.t.
8	Benny Schepmans (BEL)	Frisol–Gazelle–Thirion	s.t.
9	Bernard Bourreau (FRA)	Peugeot–Esso–Michelin	s.t.
10	Jacques Esclassan (FRA)	Peugeot–Esso–Michelin	s.t.

General classification after stage 7a

Rank	Rider	Team	Time
1	Dietrich Thurau (FRG)	Raleigh	44h 50' 43"
2	Eddy Merckx (BEL)	Fiat	+ 58"
3	Michel Laurent (FRA)	Peugeot–Esso–Michelin	+ 1' 25"
4	Bernard Thévenet (FRA)	Peugeot–Esso–Michelin	s.t.
5	Hennie Kuiper (NED)	Raleigh	+ 1' 40"
6	Alain Meslet (FRA)	Gitane–Campagnolo	+ 2' 06"
7	Joop Zoetemelk (NED)	Miko–Mercier–Hutchinson	+ 2' 07"
8	Lucien Van Impe (BEL)	Lejeune–BP	+ 2' 12"
9	Raymond Delisle (FRA)	Miko–Mercier–Hutchinson	+ 2' 32"
10	Pierre-Raymond Villemiane (FRA)	Gitane–Campagnolo	+ 2' 47"

== Stage 7b ==
8 July 1977 – Angers to Angers, 4 km (2.5 mi) (TTT)

Stage 7b result

Rank	Team	Time
1	Fiat	4' 49"
2	Peugeot–Esso–Michelin	+ 11"
3	Raleigh	+ 28"
4	Frisol–Gazelle–Thirion	s.t.
5	Gitane–Campagnolo	s.t.
6	Miko–Mercier–Hutchinson	+ 37"
7	Lejeune–BP	+ 44"
8	Bianchi–Campagnolo	+ 49"
9	Kas–Campagnolo	+ 52"
10	Teka	+ 1' 30"

General classification after stage 7b

Rank	Rider	Team	Time
1	Dietrich Thurau (FRG)	Raleigh	44h 50' 40"
2	Eddy Merckx (BEL)	Fiat	+ 51"
3	Michel Laurent (FRA)	Peugeot–Esso–Michelin	+ 1' 22"
4	Bernard Thévenet (FRA)	Peugeot–Esso–Michelin	s.t.
5	Hennie Kuiper (NED)	Raleigh	+ 1' 40"
6	Alain Meslet (FRA)	Gitane–Campagnolo	+ 2' 09"
7	Joop Zoetemelk (NED)	Miko–Mercier–Hutchinson	+ 2' 10"
8	Lucien Van Impe (BEL)	Lejeune–BP	+ 2' 15"
9	Raymond Delisle (FRA)	Miko–Mercier–Hutchinson	+ 2' 35"
10	Pierre-Raymond Villemiane (FRA)	Gitane–Campagnolo	+ 2' 50"

The times did not count for the general classification, but riders from the three fastest teams on the stage were awarded bonification seconds.

== Stage 8 ==
9 July 1977 – Angers to Lorient, 247 km (153 mi)

Stage 8 result

Rank	Rider	Team	Time
1	Giacinto Santambrogio (ITA)	Bianchi–Campagnolo	6h 32' 41"
2	Bernard Bourreau (FRA)	Peugeot–Esso–Michelin	s.t.
3	Joseph Bruyère (BEL)	Fiat	s.t.
4	Jacques Bossis (FRA)	Gitane–Campagnolo	s.t.
5	Henk Lubberding (NED)	Raleigh	s.t.
6	Maurice Le Guilloux (FRA)	Miko–Mercier–Hutchinson	s.t.
7	Antoine Gutierrez (FRA)	Lejeune–BP	s.t.
8	Bernard Quilfen (FRA)	Gitane–Campagnolo	s.t.
9	Jullio Rossi (ITA)	Bianchi–Campagnolo	s.t.
10	Eugène Plet (FRA)	Lejeune–BP	+ 3"

General classification after stage 8

Rank	Rider	Team	Time
1	Dietrich Thurau (FRG)	Raleigh	51h 23' 32"
2	Eddy Merckx (BEL)	Fiat	+ 51"
3	Michel Laurent (FRA)	Peugeot–Esso–Michelin	+ 1' 22"
4	Bernard Thévenet (FRA)	Peugeot–Esso–Michelin	s.t.
5	Hennie Kuiper (NED)	Raleigh	+ 1' 40"
6	Alain Meslet (FRA)	Gitane–Campagnolo	+ 2' 09"
7	Joop Zoetemelk (NED)	Miko–Mercier–Hutchinson	+ 2' 10"
8	Lucien Van Impe (BEL)	Lejeune–BP	+ 2' 15"
9	Raymond Delisle (FRA)	Miko–Mercier–Hutchinson	+ 2' 35"
10	Pierre-Raymond Villemiane (FRA)	Gitane–Campagnolo	+ 2' 50"

== Stage 9 ==
10 July 1977 – Lorient to Rennes, 187 km (116 mi)

Stage 9 result

Rank	Rider	Team	Time
1	Klaus-Peter Thaler (FRG)	Teka	5h 07' 36"
2	Giacinto Santambrogio (ITA)	Bianchi–Campagnolo	s.t.
3	Willy Teirlinck (BEL)	Gitane–Campagnolo	s.t.
4	Pierre-Raymond Villemiane (FRA)	Gitane–Campagnolo	s.t.
5	Patrick Béon (FRA)	Peugeot–Esso–Michelin	s.t.
6	Patrick Sercu (BEL)	Fiat	s.t.
7	Gerben Karstens (NED)	Raleigh	s.t.
8	Rik Van Linden (BEL)	Bianchi–Campagnolo	s.t.
9	Jacques Esclassan (FRA)	Peugeot–Esso–Michelin	s.t.
10	Theo Smit (NED)	Frisol–Gazelle–Thirion	s.t.

General classification after stage 9

Rank	Rider	Team	Time
1	Dietrich Thurau (FRG)	Raleigh	56h 31' 08"
2	Eddy Merckx (BEL)	Fiat	+ 51"
3	Bernard Thévenet (FRA)	Peugeot–Esso–Michelin	+ 1' 22"
4	Hennie Kuiper (NED)	Raleigh	+ 1' 40"
5	Alain Meslet (FRA)	Gitane–Campagnolo	+ 2' 09"
6	Lucien Van Impe (BEL)	Lejeune–BP	+ 2' 15"
7	Pierre-Raymond Villemiane (FRA)	Gitane–Campagnolo	+ 2' 50"
8	Michel Laurent (FRA)	Peugeot–Esso–Michelin	+ 2' 52"
9	Francisco Galdós (ESP)	Kas–Campagnolo	+ 3' 02"
10	Joop Zoetemelk (NED)	Miko–Mercier–Hutchinson	+ 3' 40"

== Stage 10 ==
11 July 1977 – Bagnoles-de-l'Orne to Rouen, 174 km (108 mi)

Stage 10 result

Rank	Rider	Team	Time
1	Fedor den Hertog (NED)	Frisol–Gazelle–Thirion	4h 49' 38"
2	Jean-Pierre Danguillaume (FRA)	Peugeot–Esso–Michelin	+ 20"
3	Jean Chassang (FRA)	Gitane–Campagnolo	s.t.
4	Rik Van Linden (BEL)	Bianchi–Campagnolo	s.t.
5	Jacques Esclassan (FRA)	Peugeot–Esso–Michelin	s.t.
6	Gerben Karstens (NED)	Raleigh	s.t.
7	Edward Janssens (BEL)	Fiat	s.t.
8	Piet van Katwijk (NED)	Raleigh	s.t.
9	Willy Teirlinck (BEL)	Gitane–Campagnolo	s.t.
10	Régis Delépine (FRA)	Peugeot–Esso–Michelin	s.t.

General classification after stage 10

Rank	Rider	Team	Time
1	Dietrich Thurau (FRG)	Raleigh	61h 21' 06"
2	Eddy Merckx (BEL)	Fiat	+ 51"
3	Bernard Thévenet (FRA)	Peugeot–Esso–Michelin	+ 1' 22"
4	Hennie Kuiper (NED)	Raleigh	+ 1' 40"
5	Alain Meslet (FRA)	Gitane–Campagnolo	+ 2' 09"
6	Lucien Van Impe (BEL)	Lejeune–BP	+ 2' 15"
7	Pierre-Raymond Villemiane (FRA)	Gitane–Campagnolo	+ 2' 50"
8	Michel Laurent (FRA)	Peugeot–Esso–Michelin	+ 2' 52"
9	Francisco Galdós (ESP)	Kas–Campagnolo	+ 3' 02"
10	Joop Zoetemelk (NED)	Miko–Mercier–Hutchinson	+ 3' 40"

== Stage 11 ==
12 July 1977 – Rouen to Roubaix, 242 km (150 mi)

Stage 11 result

Rank	Rider	Team	Time
1	Jean-Pierre Danguillaume (FRA)	Peugeot–Esso–Michelin	7h 07' 03"
2	Roy Schuiten (NED)	Lejeune–BP	+ 7"
3	Patrick Sercu (BEL)	Fiat	s.t.
4	Gerben Karstens (NED)	Raleigh	s.t.
5	Rik Van Linden (BEL)	Bianchi–Campagnolo	s.t.
6	Jacques Esclassan (FRA)	Peugeot–Esso–Michelin	s.t.
7	Piet van Katwijk (NED)	Raleigh	s.t.
8	Jacques Bossis (FRA)	Gitane–Campagnolo	s.t.
9	Dietrich Thurau (FRG)	Raleigh	s.t.
10	Charles Rouxel (FRA)	Miko–Mercier–Hutchinson	s.t.

General classification after stage 11

Rank	Rider	Team	Time
1	Dietrich Thurau (FRG)	Raleigh	68h 28' 16"
2	Eddy Merckx (BEL)	Fiat	+ 51"
3	Bernard Thévenet (FRA)	Peugeot–Esso–Michelin	+ 1' 22"
4	Hennie Kuiper (NED)	Raleigh	+ 1' 40"
5	Alain Meslet (FRA)	Gitane–Campagnolo	+ 2' 09"
6	Lucien Van Impe (BEL)	Lejeune–BP	+ 2' 15"
7	Pierre-Raymond Villemiane (FRA)	Gitane–Campagnolo	+ 2' 50"
8	Michel Laurent (FRA)	Peugeot–Esso–Michelin	+ 2' 52"
9	Francisco Galdós (ESP)	Kas–Campagnolo	+ 3' 02"
10	Joop Zoetemelk (NED)	Miko–Mercier–Hutchinson	+ 3' 40"
