= 1977 Tour de France, Stage 12 to Stage 22b =

Cycling race stages

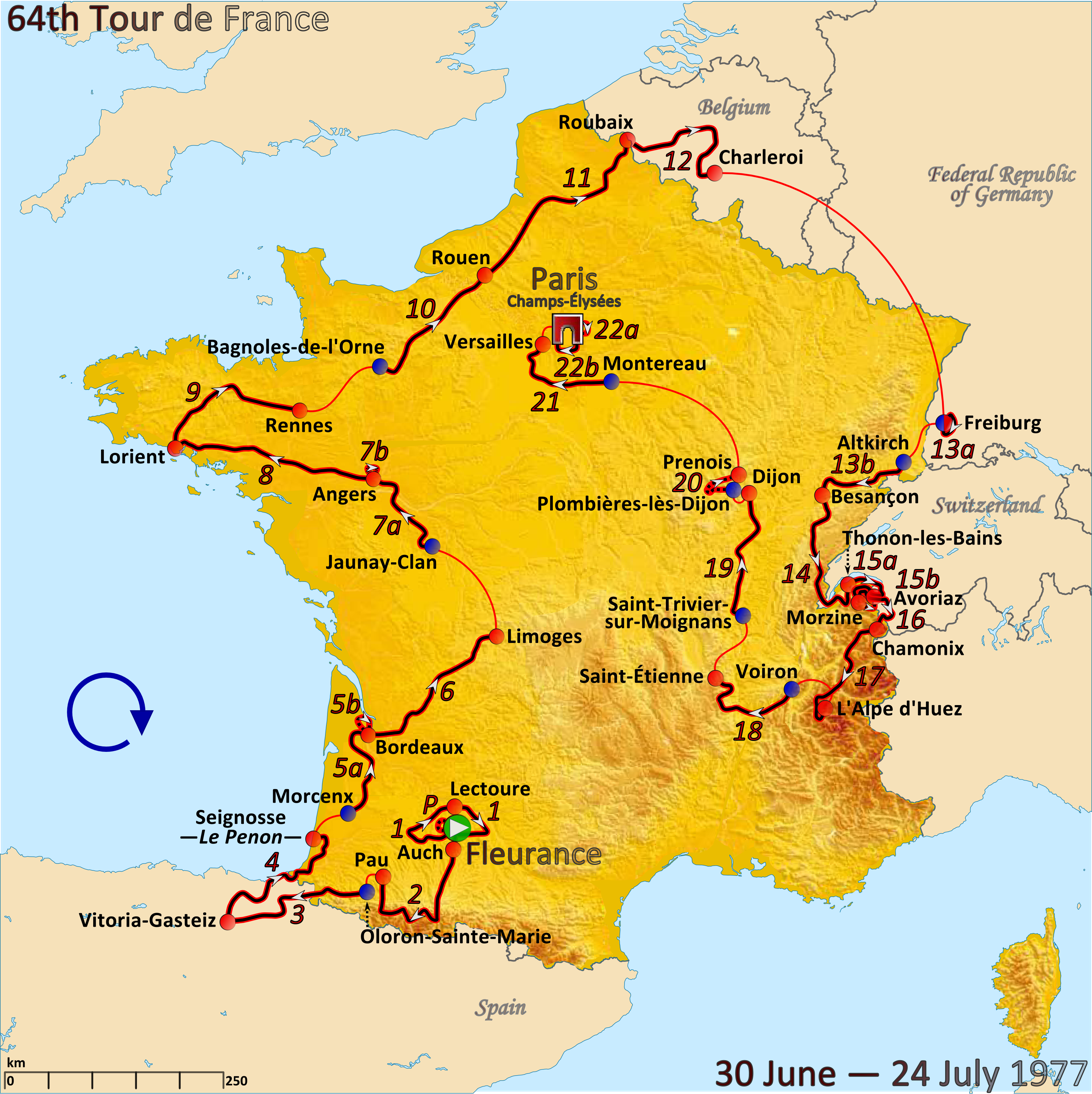
Route of the 1977 Tour de France

The 1977 Tour de France was the 64th edition of the Tour de France, one of cycling's Grand Tours. The Tour began in Fleurance with a prologue individual time trial on 30 June, and Stage 12 occurred on 13 July with a mountainous stage from Roubaix. The race finished in Paris on 24 July.

== Stage 12 ==
13 July 1977 – Roubaix to Charleroi, 193 km (120 mi)

Stage 12 result

Rank	Rider	Team	Time
1	Patrick Sercu (BEL)	Fiat	4h 32' 38"
2	Jacques Esclassan (FRA)	Peugeot–Esso–Michelin	+ 6' 23"
3	Rik Van Linden (BEL)	Bianchi–Campagnolo	s.t.
4	Theo Smit (NED)	Frisol–Gazelle–Thirion	s.t.
5	Klaus-Peter Thaler (FRG)	Teka	s.t.
6	Piet van Katwijk (NED)	Raleigh	s.t.
7	Wilfried Wesemael (BEL)	Frisol–Gazelle–Thirion	s.t.
8	Régis Ovion (FRA)	Peugeot–Esso–Michelin	s.t.
9	Charles Rouxel (FRA)	Miko–Mercier–Hutchinson	s.t.
10	Willy Teirlinck (BEL)	Gitane–Campagnolo	s.t.

General classification after stage 12

Rank	Rider	Team	Time
1	Dietrich Thurau (FRG)	Raleigh	73h 07' 17"
2	Eddy Merckx (BEL)	Fiat	+ 51"
3	Bernard Thévenet (FRA)	Peugeot–Esso–Michelin	+ 1' 22"
4	Hennie Kuiper (NED)	Raleigh	+ 1' 40"
5	Alain Meslet (FRA)	Gitane–Campagnolo	+ 2' 09"
6	Lucien Van Impe (BEL)	Lejeune–BP	+ 2' 15"
7	Pierre-Raymond Villemiane (FRA)	Gitane–Campagnolo	+ 2' 50"
8	Michel Laurent (FRA)	Peugeot–Esso–Michelin	+ 2' 52"
9	Francisco Galdós (ESP)	Kas–Campagnolo	+ 3' 02"
10	Joop Zoetemelk (NED)	Miko–Mercier–Hutchinson	+ 3' 40"

== Stage 13a ==
14 July 1977 – Freiburg to Freiburg, 46 km (29 mi)

Stage 13a result

Rank	Rider	Team	Time
1	Patrick Sercu (BEL)	Fiat	56' 42"
2	Rik Van Linden (BEL)	Bianchi–Campagnolo	s.t.
3	Dietrich Thurau (FRG)	Raleigh	s.t.
4	Jacques Esclassan (FRA)	Peugeot–Esso–Michelin	s.t.
5	Piet van Katwijk (NED)	Raleigh	s.t.
6	Gerben Karstens (NED)	Raleigh	s.t.
7	Guy Sibille (FRA)	Peugeot–Esso–Michelin	s.t.
8	Theo Smit (NED)	Frisol–Gazelle–Thirion	s.t.
9	André Chalmel (FRA)	Gitane–Campagnolo	s.t.
10	Barry Hoban (GBR)	Miko–Mercier–Hutchinson	s.t.

General classification after stage 13a

Rank	Rider	Team	Time
1	Dietrich Thurau (FRG)	Raleigh	74h 03' 59"
2	Eddy Merckx (BEL)	Fiat	+ 51"
3	Bernard Thévenet (FRA)	Peugeot–Esso–Michelin	+ 1' 22"
4	Hennie Kuiper (NED)	Raleigh	+ 1' 40"
5	Alain Meslet (FRA)	Gitane–Campagnolo	+ 2' 09"
6	Lucien Van Impe (BEL)	Lejeune–BP	+ 2' 15"
7	Pierre-Raymond Villemiane (FRA)	Gitane–Campagnolo	+ 2' 50"
8	Michel Laurent (FRA)	Peugeot–Esso–Michelin	+ 2' 52"
9	Francisco Galdós (ESP)	Kas–Campagnolo	+ 3' 02"
10	Joop Zoetemelk (NED)	Miko–Mercier–Hutchinson	+ 3' 40"

== Stage 13b ==
14 July 1977 – Altkirch to Besançon, 160 km (99 mi)

Stage 13b result

Rank	Rider	Team	Time
1	Jean-Pierre Danguillaume (FRA)	Peugeot–Esso–Michelin	4h 06' 00"
2	Bert Pronk (NED)	Raleigh	s.t.
3	Vicente López Carril (ESP)	Kas–Campagnolo	s.t.
4	Klaus-Peter Thaler (FRG)	Teka	+ 1' 21"
5	Piet van Katwijk (NED)	Raleigh	s.t.
6	Rik Van Linden (BEL)	Bianchi–Campagnolo	s.t.
7	Barry Hoban (GBR)	Miko–Mercier–Hutchinson	s.t.
8	Gerben Karstens (NED)	Raleigh	s.t.
9	Jacques Esclassan (FRA)	Peugeot–Esso–Michelin	s.t.
10	Wilfried Wesemael (BEL)	Frisol–Gazelle–Thirion	s.t.

General classification after stage 13b

Rank	Rider	Team	Time
1	Dietrich Thurau (FRG)	Raleigh	78h 11' 20"
2	Eddy Merckx (BEL)	Fiat	+ 51"
3	Bernard Thévenet (FRA)	Peugeot–Esso–Michelin	+ 1' 22"
4	Hennie Kuiper (NED)	Raleigh	+ 1' 40"
5	Alain Meslet (FRA)	Gitane–Campagnolo	+ 2' 09"
6	Lucien Van Impe (BEL)	Lejeune–BP	+ 2' 15"
7	Pierre-Raymond Villemiane (FRA)	Gitane–Campagnolo	+ 2' 50"
8	Michel Laurent (FRA)	Peugeot–Esso–Michelin	+ 2' 52"
9	Francisco Galdós (ESP)	Kas–Campagnolo	+ 3' 02"
10	Joop Zoetemelk (NED)	Miko–Mercier–Hutchinson	+ 3' 40"

== Rest day 2 ==
15 July 1977 – Freiburg

== Stage 14 ==
16 July 1977 – Besançon to Thonon-les-Bains, 230 km (140 mi)

Stage 14 result

Rank	Rider	Team	Time
1	Bernard Quilfen (FRA)	Gitane–Campagnolo	6h 15' 46"
2	Jacques Esclassan (FRA)	Peugeot–Esso–Michelin	+ 3' 14"
3	Dietrich Thurau (FRG)	Raleigh	s.t.
4	José De Cauwer (BEL)	Raleigh	s.t.
5	Giacinto Santambrogio (ITA)	Bianchi–Campagnolo	s.t.
6	Klaus-Peter Thaler (FRG)	Teka	s.t.
7	Eddy Merckx (BEL)	Fiat	s.t.
8	Régis Ovion (FRA)	Peugeot–Esso–Michelin	s.t.
9	Hennie Kuiper (NED)	Raleigh	s.t.
10	Jacques Bossis (FRA)	Gitane–Campagnolo	s.t.

General classification after stage 14

Rank	Rider	Team	Time
1	Dietrich Thurau (FRG)	Raleigh	84h 30' 20"
2	Eddy Merckx (BEL)	Fiat	+ 51"
3	Bernard Thévenet (FRA)	Peugeot–Esso–Michelin	+ 1' 22"
4	Hennie Kuiper (NED)	Raleigh	+ 1' 40"
5	Alain Meslet (FRA)	Gitane–Campagnolo	+ 2' 09"
6	Lucien Van Impe (BEL)	Lejeune–BP	+ 2' 15"
7	Pierre-Raymond Villemiane (FRA)	Gitane–Campagnolo	+ 2' 50"
8	Michel Laurent (FRA)	Peugeot–Esso–Michelin	+ 2' 52"
9	Francisco Galdós (ESP)	Kas–Campagnolo	+ 3' 02"
10	Joop Zoetemelk (NED)	Miko–Mercier–Hutchinson	+ 3' 40"

== Stage 15a ==
17 July 1977 – Thonon-les-Bains to Morzine, 105 km (65 mi)

Stage 15a result

Rank	Rider	Team	Time
1	Paul Wellens (BEL)	Frisol–Gazelle–Thirion	2h 55' 59"
2	Glauco Santoni (ITA)	Bianchi–Campagnolo	+ 3' 01"
3	Giacinto Santambrogio (ITA)	Bianchi–Campagnolo	+ 3' 06"
4	Klaus-Peter Thaler (FRG)	Teka	+ 3' 08"
5	Jacques Esclassan (FRA)	Peugeot–Esso–Michelin	s.t.
6	Pierre-Raymond Villemiane (FRA)	Gitane–Campagnolo	s.t.
7	Christian Seznec (FRA)	Miko–Mercier–Hutchinson	s.t.
8	André Chalmel (FRA)	Gitane–Campagnolo	s.t.
9	Eddy Merckx (BEL)	Fiat	s.t.
10	Antonio Menéndez (POR)	Kas–Campagnolo	s.t.

General classification after stage 15a

Rank	Rider	Team	Time
1	Dietrich Thurau (FRG)	Raleigh	87h 29' 27"
2	Eddy Merckx (BEL)	Fiat	+ 51"
3	Bernard Thévenet (FRA)	Peugeot–Esso–Michelin	+ 1' 22"
4	Hennie Kuiper (NED)	Raleigh	+ 1' 40"
5	Alain Meslet (FRA)	Gitane–Campagnolo	+ 2' 09"
6	Lucien Van Impe (BEL)	Lejeune–BP	+ 2' 15"
7	Pierre-Raymond Villemiane (FRA)	Gitane–Campagnolo	+ 2' 50"
8	Michel Laurent (FRA)	Peugeot–Esso–Michelin	+ 2' 52"
9	Francisco Galdós (ESP)	Kas–Campagnolo	+ 3' 02"
10	Joop Zoetemelk (NED)	Miko–Mercier–Hutchinson	+ 3' 40"

== Stage 15b ==
17 July 1977 – Morzine to Avoriaz, 14 km (8.7 mi) (ITT)

Stage 15b result

Rank	Rider	Team	Time
~~1~~	~~Joop Zoetemelk (NED)~~	~~Miko–Mercier–Hutchinson~~	~~33' 04"~~ (Note: After stage 15, Zoetemelk was declassified and penalised ten minutes for failing a dope test.)
1	Lucien Van Impe (BEL)	Lejeune–BP	33' 49"
2	Bernard Thévenet (FRA)	Peugeot–Esso–Michelin	+ 20"
4	Michel Laurent (FRA)	Peugeot–Esso–Michelin	+ 22"
5	Gerrie Knetemann (NED)	Raleigh	+ 23"
6	Francisco Galdós (ESP)	Kas–Campagnolo	+ 36"
7	Raymond Martin (FRA)	Miko–Mercier–Hutchinson	+ 49"
8	Hennie Kuiper (NED)	Raleigh	+ 51"
9	Bert Pronk (NED)	Raleigh	+ 1' 06"
10	Eddy Merckx (BEL)	Fiat	+ 1' 16"

General classification after stage 15b

Rank	Rider	Team	Time
1	Bernard Thévenet (FRA)	Peugeot–Esso–Michelin	88h 04' 58"
2	Dietrich Thurau (FRG)	Raleigh	+ 11"
3	Eddy Merckx (BEL)	Fiat	+ 25"
4	Lucien Van Impe (BEL)	Lejeune–BP	+ 33"
5	Hennie Kuiper (NED)	Raleigh	+ 49"
6	Joop Zoetemelk (NED)	Miko–Mercier–Hutchinson	+ 1' 13"
7	Michel Laurent (FRA)	Peugeot–Esso–Michelin	+ 1' 32"
8	Francisco Galdós (ESP)	Kas–Campagnolo	+ 1' 56"
9	Raymond Delisle (FRA)	Miko–Mercier–Hutchinson	+ 3' 45"
10	Pierre-Raymond Villemiane (FRA)	Gitane–Campagnolo	+ 3' 49"

== Stage 16 ==
18 July 1977 – Morzine to Chamonix, 121 km (75 mi)

Stage 16 result

Rank	Rider	Team	Time
1	Dietrich Thurau (FRG)	Raleigh	3h 29' 52"
2	Sebastián Pozo (ESP)	Kas–Campagnolo	s.t.
3	Joop Zoetemelk (NED)	Miko–Mercier–Hutchinson	s.t.
4	Bernard Thévenet (FRA)	Peugeot–Esso–Michelin	s.t.
5	Lucien Van Impe (BEL)	Lejeune–BP	s.t.
6	Bernard Vallet (FRA)	Miko–Mercier–Hutchinson	s.t.
7	José Martíns (POR)	Kas–Campagnolo	s.t.
8	Joaquim Agostinho (POR)	Teka	s.t.
9	Hennie Kuiper (NED)	Raleigh	s.t.
10	Francisco Galdós (ESP)	Kas–Campagnolo	s.t.

General classification after stage 16

Rank	Rider	Team	Time
1	Bernard Thévenet (FRA)	Peugeot–Esso–Michelin	91h 34' 50"
2	Dietrich Thurau (FRG)	Raleigh	+ 11"
3	Lucien Van Impe (BEL)	Lejeune–BP	+ 33"
4	Hennie Kuiper (NED)	Raleigh	+ 49"
5	Joop Zoetemelk (NED)	Miko–Mercier–Hutchinson	+ 1' 13"
6	Francisco Galdós (ESP)	Kas–Campagnolo	+ 1' 56"
7	Eddy Merckx (BEL)	Fiat	+ 3' 02"
8	Raymond Delisle (FRA)	Miko–Mercier–Hutchinson	+ 3' 45"
9	Michel Laurent (FRA)	Peugeot–Esso–Michelin	+ 4' 09"
10	Pierre-Raymond Villemiane (FRA)	Gitane–Campagnolo	+ 11' 16"

== Stage 17 ==
19 July 1977 – Chamonix to Alpe d'Huez, 185 km (115 mi)

Stage 17 result

Rank	Rider	Team	Time
1	Hennie Kuiper (NED)	Raleigh	6h 00' 20"
2	Bernard Thévenet (FRA)	Peugeot–Esso–Michelin	+ 41"
3	Lucien Van Impe (BEL)	Lejeune–BP	+ 2' 06"
4	Francisco Galdós (ESP)	Kas–Campagnolo	+ 2' 59"
5	Joop Zoetemelk (NED)	Miko–Mercier–Hutchinson	+ 4' 40"
6	Raymond Martin (FRA)	Miko–Mercier–Hutchinson	+ 8' 15"
7	Sebastián Pozo (ESP)	Kas–Campagnolo	+ 8' 39"
8	Joaquim Agostinho (POR)	Teka	+ 8' 44"
9	Michel Laurent (FRA)	Peugeot–Esso–Michelin	+ 9' 29"
10	Pedro Torres (ESP)	Teka	+ 10' 49"

General classification after stage 17

Rank	Rider	Team	Time
1	Bernard Thévenet (FRA)	Peugeot–Esso–Michelin	97h 35' 51"
2	Hennie Kuiper (NED)	Raleigh	+ 8"
3	Lucien Van Impe (BEL)	Lejeune–BP	+ 1' 58"
4	Francisco Galdós (ESP)	Kas–Campagnolo	+ 4' 14"
5	Joop Zoetemelk (NED)	Miko–Mercier–Hutchinson	+ 5' 12"
6	Dietrich Thurau (FRG)	Raleigh	+ 12' 02"
7	Michel Laurent (FRA)	Peugeot–Esso–Michelin	+ 12' 57"
8	Raymond Delisle (FRA)	Miko–Mercier–Hutchinson	+ 14' 54"
9	Eddy Merckx (BEL)	Fiat	+ 16' 12"
10	Raymond Martin (FRA)	Miko–Mercier–Hutchinson	+ 22' 59"

== Stage 18 ==
20 July 1977 – Rossignol Voiron to Saint-Étienne, 199 km (124 mi)

Stage 18 result

Rank	Rider	Team	Time
~~1~~	~~Joaquim Agostinho (POR)~~	~~Teka~~	~~5h 56' 05"~~ (Note: After stage 18, Agostinho and Menéndez were declassified for failing a doping test. There was no winner declared for the stage.)
~~2~~	~~Antonio Menéndez (ESP)~~	~~Kas–Campagnolo~~	~~+ 3' 17"~~
3	Eddy Merckx (BEL)	Fiat	+ 3' 30"
4	Régis Ovion (FRA)	Peugeot–Esso–Michelin	+ 7' 59"
5	Giacinto Santambrogio (ITA)	Bianchi–Campagnolo	s.t.
6	Pierre-Raymond Villemiane (FRA)	Gitane–Campagnolo	s.t.
7	Jacques Esclassan (FRA)	Peugeot–Esso–Michelin	s.t.
8	Christian Seznec (FRA)	Miko–Mercier–Hutchinson	s.t.
9	Bernard Vallet (FRA)	Miko–Mercier–Hutchinson	s.t.
10	Giovanni Cavalcanti (ITA)	Bianchi–Campagnolo	s.t.

General classification after stage 18

Rank	Rider	Team	Time
1	Bernard Thévenet (FRA)	Peugeot–Esso–Michelin	103h 39' 55"
2	Hennie Kuiper (NED)	Raleigh	+ 8"
3	Lucien Van Impe (BEL)	Lejeune–BP	+ 1' 58"
4	Francisco Galdós (ESP)	Kas–Campagnolo	+ 4' 14"
5	Joop Zoetemelk (NED)	Miko–Mercier–Hutchinson	+ 5' 12"
6	Eddy Merckx (BEL)	Fiat	+ 11' 33"
7	Dietrich Thurau (FRG)	Raleigh	+ 12' 07"
8	Michel Laurent (FRA)	Peugeot–Esso–Michelin	+ 12' 57"
9	Raymond Delisle (FRA)	Miko–Mercier–Hutchinson	+ 14' 59"
10	Joaquim Agostinho (POR)	Teka	+ 21' 33"

== Stage 19 ==
21 July 1977 – Saint-Trivier-sur-Moignans to Dijon, 172 km (107 mi)

Stage 19 result

Rank	Rider	Team	Time
1	Gerrie Knetemann (NED)	Raleigh	4h 29' 17"
2	Cees Bal (NED)	Fiat	+ 1"
3	Gerben Karstens (NED)	Raleigh	+ 56"
4	Giacinto Santambrogio (ITA)	Bianchi–Campagnolo	s.t.
5	Jos Huysmans (BEL)	Fiat	s.t.
6	Barry Hoban (GBR)	Miko–Mercier–Hutchinson	s.t.
7	José De Cauwer (BEL)	Raleigh	s.t.
8	Hennie Kuiper (NED)	Raleigh	s.t.
9	André Chalmel (FRA)	Gitane–Campagnolo	s.t.
10	Régis Ovion (FRA)	Peugeot–Esso–Michelin	s.t.

General classification after stage 19

Rank	Rider	Team	Time
1	Bernard Thévenet (FRA)	Peugeot–Esso–Michelin	108h 10' 08"
2	Hennie Kuiper (NED)	Raleigh	+ 8"
3	Lucien Van Impe (BEL)	Lejeune–BP	+ 1' 58"
4	Francisco Galdós (ESP)	Kas–Campagnolo	+ 4' 14"
5	Joop Zoetemelk (NED)	Miko–Mercier–Hutchinson	+ 5' 12"
6	Eddy Merckx (BEL)	Fiat	+ 11' 33"
7	Dietrich Thurau (FRG)	Raleigh	+ 12' 07"
8	Michel Laurent (FRA)	Peugeot–Esso–Michelin	+ 12' 57"
9	Raymond Delisle (FRA)	Miko–Mercier–Hutchinson	+ 14' 59"
10	Joaquim Agostinho (POR)	Teka	+ 21' 33"

== Stage 20 ==
22 July 1977 – Dijon to Dijon, 50 km (31 mi) (ITT)

Stage 20 result

Rank	Rider	Team	Time
1	Bernard Thévenet (FRA)	Peugeot–Esso–Michelin	1h 10' 45"
2	Dietrich Thurau (FRG)	Raleigh	+ 23"
3	Hennie Kuiper (NED)	Raleigh	+ 28"
4	Gerrie Knetemann (NED)	Raleigh	+ 43"
5	Joseph Bruyère (BEL)	Fiat	+ 47"
6	Eddy Merckx (BEL)	Fiat	+ 1' 02"
7	Joaquim Agostinho (POR)	Teka	+ 1' 19"
8	Lucien Van Impe (BEL)	Lejeune–BP	+ 1' 24"
9	Francisco Galdós (ESP)	Kas–Campagnolo	+ 3' 04"
10	Bernard Vallet (FRA)	Miko–Mercier–Hutchinson	+ 3' 59"

General classification after stage 20

Rank	Rider	Team	Time
1	Bernard Thévenet (FRA)	Peugeot–Esso–Michelin	109h 20' 53"
2	Hennie Kuiper (NED)	Raleigh	+ 36"
3	Lucien Van Impe (BEL)	Lejeune–BP	+ 3' 22"
4	Francisco Galdós (ESP)	Kas–Campagnolo	+ 7' 18"
5	Joop Zoetemelk (NED)	Miko–Mercier–Hutchinson	+ 9' 36"
6	Dietrich Thurau (FRG)	Raleigh	+ 12' 30"
7	Eddy Merckx (BEL)	Fiat	+ 12' 35"
8	Michel Laurent (FRA)	Peugeot–Esso–Michelin	+ 17' 37"
9	Raymond Delisle (FRA)	Miko–Mercier–Hutchinson	+ 20' 44"
10	Joaquim Agostinho (POR)	Teka	+ 22' 52"

== Stage 21 ==
23 July 1977 – Montereau-Fault-Yonne to Versailles, 142 km (88 mi)

Stage 21 result

Rank	Rider	Team	Time
1	Gerrie Knetemann (NED)	Raleigh	3h 59' 22"
2	Joop Zoetemelk (NED)	Miko–Mercier–Hutchinson	s.t.
3	Michel Laurent (FRA)	Peugeot–Esso–Michelin	s.t.
4	Guy Sibille (FRA)	Peugeot–Esso–Michelin	+ 19"
5	Barry Hoban (GBR)	Miko–Mercier–Hutchinson	s.t.
6	Jos Huysmans (BEL)	Fiat	s.t.
7	Pierre-Raymond Villemiane (FRA)	Gitane–Campagnolo	s.t.
8	Jacques Esclassan (FRA)	Peugeot–Esso–Michelin	s.t.
9	Giacinto Santambrogio (ITA)	Bianchi–Campagnolo	s.t.
10	Christian Seznec (FRA)	Miko–Mercier–Hutchinson	s.t.

General classification after stage 21

Rank	Rider	Team	Time
1	Bernard Thévenet (FRA)	Peugeot–Esso–Michelin	113h 20' 34"
2	Hennie Kuiper (NED)	Raleigh	+ 36"
3	Lucien Van Impe (BEL)	Lejeune–BP	+ 3' 22"
4	Francisco Galdós (ESP)	Kas–Campagnolo	+ 7' 18"
5	Joop Zoetemelk (NED)	Miko–Mercier–Hutchinson	+ 9' 17"
6	Dietrich Thurau (FRG)	Raleigh	+ 12' 30"
7	Eddy Merckx (BEL)	Fiat	+ 12' 35"
8	Michel Laurent (FRA)	Peugeot–Esso–Michelin	+ 17' 18"
9	Raymond Delisle (FRA)	Miko–Mercier–Hutchinson	+ 20' 44"
10	Joaquim Agostinho (POR)	Teka	+ 22' 52"

== Stage 22a ==
24 July 1977 – Paris to Paris, 6 km (3.7 mi) (ITT)

Stage 22a result

Rank	Rider	Team	Time
1	Dietrich Thurau (FRG)	Raleigh	7' 52"
2	Gerrie Knetemann (NED)	Raleigh	+ 3"
3	Bernard Thévenet (FRA)	Peugeot–Esso–Michelin	+ 6"
4	Eddy Merckx (BEL)	Fiat	+ 9"
5	Joseph Bruyère (BEL)	Fiat	+ 11"
6	Joop Zoetemelk (NED)	Miko–Mercier–Hutchinson	s.t.
7	Lucien Van Impe (BEL)	Lejeune–BP	+ 16"
8	Hennie Kuiper (NED)	Raleigh	+ 18"
9	José Enrique Cima (ESP)	Kas–Campagnolo	s.t.
10	Bert Pronk (NED)	Raleigh	+ 19"

General classification after stage 22a

Rank	Rider	Team	Time
1	Bernard Thévenet (FRA)	Peugeot–Esso–Michelin	113h 28' 32"
2	Hennie Kuiper (NED)	Raleigh	+ 48"
3	Lucien Van Impe (BEL)	Lejeune–BP	+ 3' 32"
4	Francisco Galdós (ESP)	Kas–Campagnolo	+ 7' 45"
5	Joop Zoetemelk (NED)	Miko–Mercier–Hutchinson	+ 9' 22"
6	Dietrich Thurau (FRG)	Raleigh	+ 12' 24"
7	Eddy Merckx (BEL)	Fiat	+ 12' 38"
8	Michel Laurent (FRA)	Peugeot–Esso–Michelin	+ 17' 42"
9	Raymond Delisle (FRA)	Miko–Mercier–Hutchinson	+ 21' 32"
10	Joaquim Agostinho (POR)	Teka	+ 23' 13"

== Stage 22b ==
24 July 1977 – Paris to Paris Champs-Élysées, 91 km (57 mi)

Stage 22b result

Rank	Rider	Team	Time
1	Alain Meslet (FRA)	Gitane–Campagnolo	2h 09' 04"
2	Gerben Karstens (NED)	Raleigh	+ 49"
3	Barry Hoban (GBR)	Miko–Mercier–Hutchinson	+ 54"
4	Guy Sibille (FRA)	Peugeot–Esso–Michelin	s.t.
5	Eddy Merckx (BEL)	Fiat	s.t.
6	Jacques Esclassan (FRA)	Peugeot–Esso–Michelin	s.t.
7	Christian Seznec (FRA)	Miko–Mercier–Hutchinson	s.t.
8	Michel Le Denmat (FRA)	Lejeune–BP	s.t.
9	Pierre-Raymond Villemiane (FRA)	Gitane–Campagnolo	s.t.
10	Hennie Kuiper (NED)	Raleigh	s.t.

General classification after stage 22b

Rank	Rider	Team	Time
1	Bernard Thévenet (FRA)	Peugeot–Esso–Michelin	115h 38' 30"
2	Hennie Kuiper (NED)	Raleigh	+ 48"
3	Lucien Van Impe (BEL)	Lejeune–BP	+ 3' 32"
4	Francisco Galdós (ESP)	Kas–Campagnolo	+ 7' 45"
5	Dietrich Thurau (FRG)	Raleigh	+ 12' 24"
6	Eddy Merckx (BEL)	Fiat	+ 12' 38"
7	Michel Laurent (FRA)	Peugeot–Esso–Michelin	+ 17' 42"
8	Joop Zoetemelk (NED)	Miko–Mercier–Hutchinson	+ 19' 22"
9	Raymond Delisle (FRA)	Miko–Mercier–Hutchinson	+ 21' 32"
10	Alain Meslet (FRA)	Gitane–Campagnolo	+ 27' 31"
