= 1977 Tour de France =

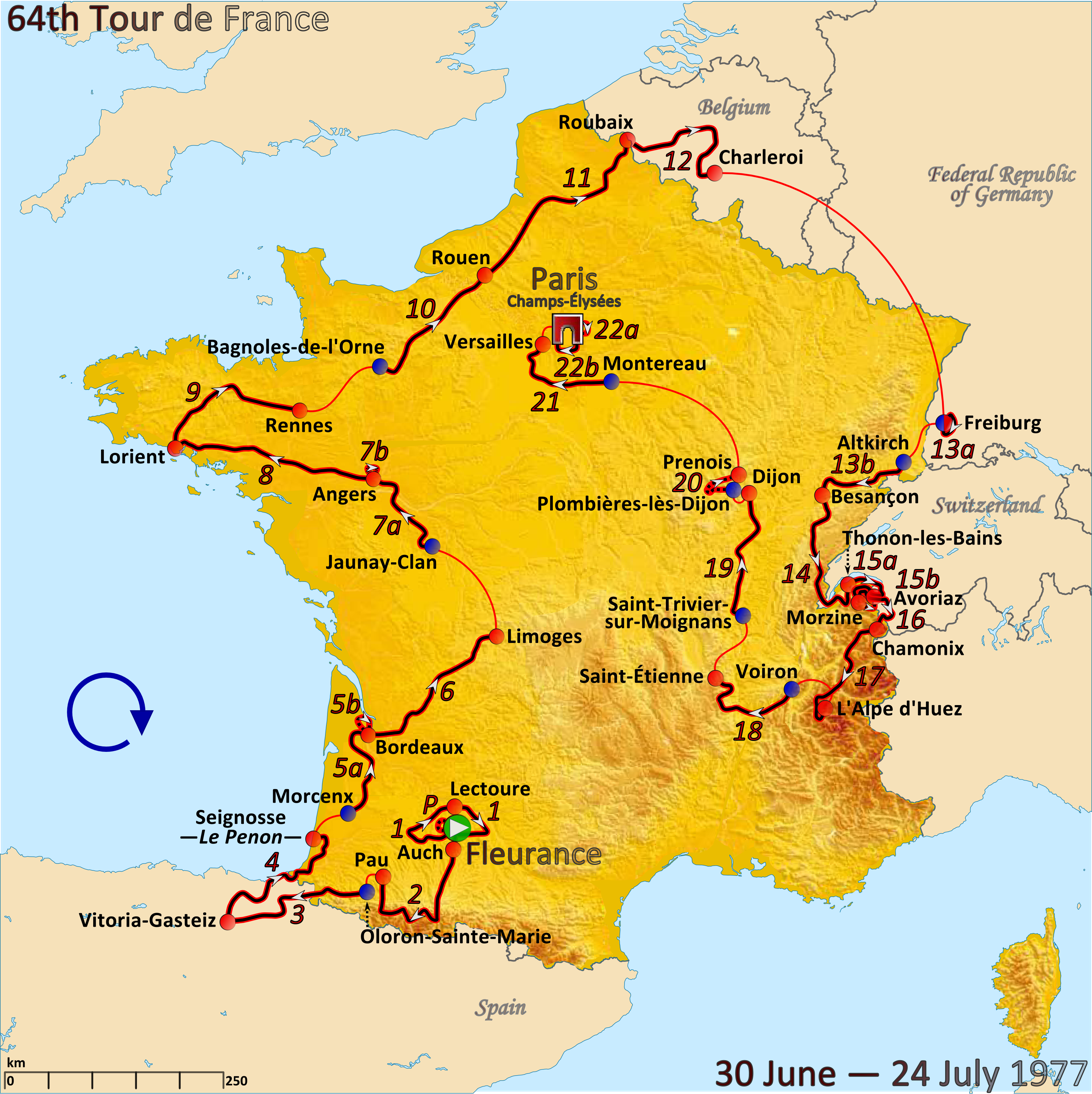
- Route of the 1977 Tour de France

Race details
- Dates: 30 June – 24 July 1977
- Stages: 22 + Prologue, including five split stages
- Distance: 4,096 km (2,545 mi)
- Winning time: 115h 38' 30"

Results
Jersey awarded to the overall winner	Winner	Bernard Thévenet (FRA)	(Peugeot–Esso–Michelin)
	Second	Hennie Kuiper (NED)	(TI–Raleigh)
	Third	Lucien Van Impe (BEL)	(Lejeune–BP)
Jersey awarded to the points classification winner	Points	Jacques Esclassan (FRA)	(Peugeot–Esso–Michelin)
Jersey awarded to the mountains classification winner	Mountains	Lucien Van Impe (BEL)	(Lejeune–BP)
Jersey awarded to the young rider classification winner	Young rider	Dietrich Thurau (FRG)	(TI–Raleigh)
	Sprints	Pierre-Raymond Villemiane (FRA)	(Gitane–Campagnolo)
	Combativity	Gerrie Knetemann (NED)	(TI–Raleigh)
	Team	TI–Raleigh	
	Team points	Peugeot–Esso–Michelin	

The 1977 Tour de France was the 64th edition of the Tour de France, taking place between 30 June and 24 July. The total race distance was 22 stages over 4,096 km (2,545 mi).

Lucien Van Impe, the winner of the previous year, wanted to repeat his victory and going into stage 16 Van Impe along with Eddy Merckx and Joop Zoetemelk were all within about 1:00 of Bernard Thévenet who had just taken the maillot jaune from Dietrich Thurau. Merckx fell off the back near the end of the tour, Zoetemelk was penalized ten minutes and Van Impe had his bike damaged when he was hit by a motorist on Alpe d'Huez where Kuiper won the stage but was unable to break Thévenet, who won the Tour with the smallest margin since the 1968 Tour de France.

== Teams ==
To ride the Tour, teams had to pay money. The other Grand Tours, the Giro d'Italia and the Vuelta a España, paid the teams money to start. For financial reasons, some teams chose to avoid the Tour, and only 100 cyclists started the race, divided in ten teams of ten cyclists each. One of the notable absentees was Michel Pollentier.

The teams entering the race were:

- Lejeune–BP
- Miko–Mercier–Vivagel
- Peugeot–Esso–Michelin
- Kas–Campagnolo
- Frisol–Thirion–Gazelle
- Gitane–Campagnolo
- Teka
- Fiat France
- TI–Raleigh
- Bianchi–Campagnolo

== Pre-race favourites ==
Bernard Thévenet, the winner of 1975, was considered the main favourite, because the course of the race was considered suited to his talents. In March 1977, Thévenet had been penalised for a positive doping test in Paris–Nice.

The winner of the 1976 edition, Lucien Van Impe, was specialized in climbing, so his chances in the 1977 edition with less mountains were slimmer. Two other contenders were teammates Raymond Delisle and Joop Zoetemelk, fourth and second in the 1976 edition. Hennie Kuiper, the reigning world champion, was also a favourite.

Five-time winner Eddy Merckx was also competing, and was still considered an outsider for the victory, but he was no longer as dominant as before.

== Route and stages ==
The 1977 Tour de France started on 30 June, and had two rest days, in Bordeaux and Freiburg. The 1976 Tour had been focused around the mountains, with five hilltop finishes. In 1977, the climbing was de-emphasized, with only two hilltop finishes, and more emphasis on the time trials. The highest point of elevation in the race was 2,115 m (6,939 ft) at the summit of the Col du Tourmalet mountain pass on stage 2.

The first stage from Fleurance to Auch was split in two parts: 140 km from Fleurance to Lectoure, directly followed by 97 km from Lectoure to Auch. It was the first time a "flying stage" was used. The stage was split in two parts, but there was no stop in between. After the riders reached the finish line of the first part, they immediately continued for the next part; if a group was ahead of the rest, they kept this advantage. The first riders to reach the finish of the flying stage were given prizes and points for the points classification as if it was a normal stage; the general classification was not changed.

Stage characteristics and winners
Stage	Date	Course	Distance	Type	Winner
P	30 June	Fleurance	5 km (3.1 mi)	Individual time trial	Dietrich Thurau (FRG)
1	1 July	Fleurance to Auch	237 km (147 mi)	Plain stage	Pierre-Raymond Villemiane (FRA)
2	2 July	Auch to Pau	253 km (157 mi)	Stage with mountain(s)	Dietrich Thurau (FRG)
3	3 July	Oloron-Sainte-Marie to Vitoria-Gasteiz (Spain)	248 km (154 mi)	Stage with mountain(s)	José Nazabal (ESP)
4	4 July	Vitoria-Gasteiz (Spain) to Seignosse le Penon	256 km (159 mi)	Stage with mountain(s)	Régis Delépine (FRA)
5a	5 July	Morcenx to Bordeaux	139 km (86 mi)	Plain stage	Jacques Esclassan (FRA)
5b	5 July	Bordeaux	30 km (19 mi)	Individual time trial	Dietrich Thurau (FRG)
	6 July	Bordeaux		Rest day	
6	7 July	Bordeaux to Limoges	225 km (140 mi)	Plain stage	Jan Raas (NED)
7a	8 July	Jaunay-Clan to Angers	140 km (87 mi)	Plain stage	Patrick Sercu (BEL)
7b	8 July	Angers	4 km (2.5 mi)	Team time trial	(Belgium) Fiat France
8	9 July	Angers to Lorient	247 km (153 mi)	Plain stage	Giacinto Santambrogio (ITA)
9	10 July	Lorient to Rennes	187 km (116 mi)	Stage with mountain(s)	Klaus-Peter Thaler (FRG)
10	11 July	Bagnoles-de-l'Orne to Rouen	174 km (108 mi)	Plain stage	Fedor den Hertog (NED)
11	12 July	Rouen to Roubaix	242 km (150 mi)	Plain stage	Jean-Pierre Danguillaume (FRA)
12	13 July	Roubaix to Charleroi (Belgium)	193 km (120 mi)	Stage with mountain(s)	Patrick Sercu (BEL)
	14 July	Freiburg		Rest day	
13a	15 July	Freiburg (West Germany)	46 km (29 mi)	Plain stage	Patrick Sercu (BEL)
13b	15 July	Altkirch to Besançon	160 km (99 mi)	Plain stage	Jean-Pierre Danguillaume (FRA)
14	16 July	Besançon to Thonon-les-Bains	230 km (140 mi)	Stage with mountain(s)	Bernard Quilfen (FRA)
15a	17 July	Thonon-les-Bains to Morzine	105 km (65 mi)	Stage with mountain(s)	Paul Wellens (BEL)
15b	17 July	Morzine to Avoriaz	14 km (8.7 mi)	Individual time trial	Lucien Van Impe (BEL) (Note: Stage 15b was initially won by Joop Zoetemelk, but he failed the doping test. The stage victory was then given to Van Impe, who initially was second in that stage.)
16	18 July	Morzine to Chamonix	121 km (75 mi)	Stage with mountain(s)	Dietrich Thurau (FRG)
17	19 July	Chamonix to Alpe d'Huez	185 km (115 mi)	Stage with mountain(s)	Hennie Kuiper (NED)
18	20 July	Rossignol Voiron to Saint-Étienne	199 km (124 mi)	Stage with mountain(s)	no winner (Note: Stage 18 was initially won by Joaquim Agostinho, but he failed the doping test, along with Antonio Menéndez who finished second. Since Eddy Merckx, who finished third, was not tested after the stage, he was not given the victory.)
19	21 July	Saint-Trivier-sur-Moignans to Dijon	172 km (107 mi)	Plain stage	Gerrie Knetemann (NED)
20	22 July	Dijon	50 km (31 mi)	Individual time trial	Bernard Thévenet (FRA)
21	23 July	Montereau-Fault-Yonne to Versailles	142 km (88 mi)	Plain stage	Gerrie Knetemann (NED)
22a	24 July	Paris	6 km (3.7 mi)	Individual time trial	Dietrich Thurau (FRG)
22b	24 July	Paris (Champs-Élysées)	91 km (57 mi)	Plain stage	Alain Meslet (FRA)
	Total		4,096 km (2,545 mi)		

== Race overview ==
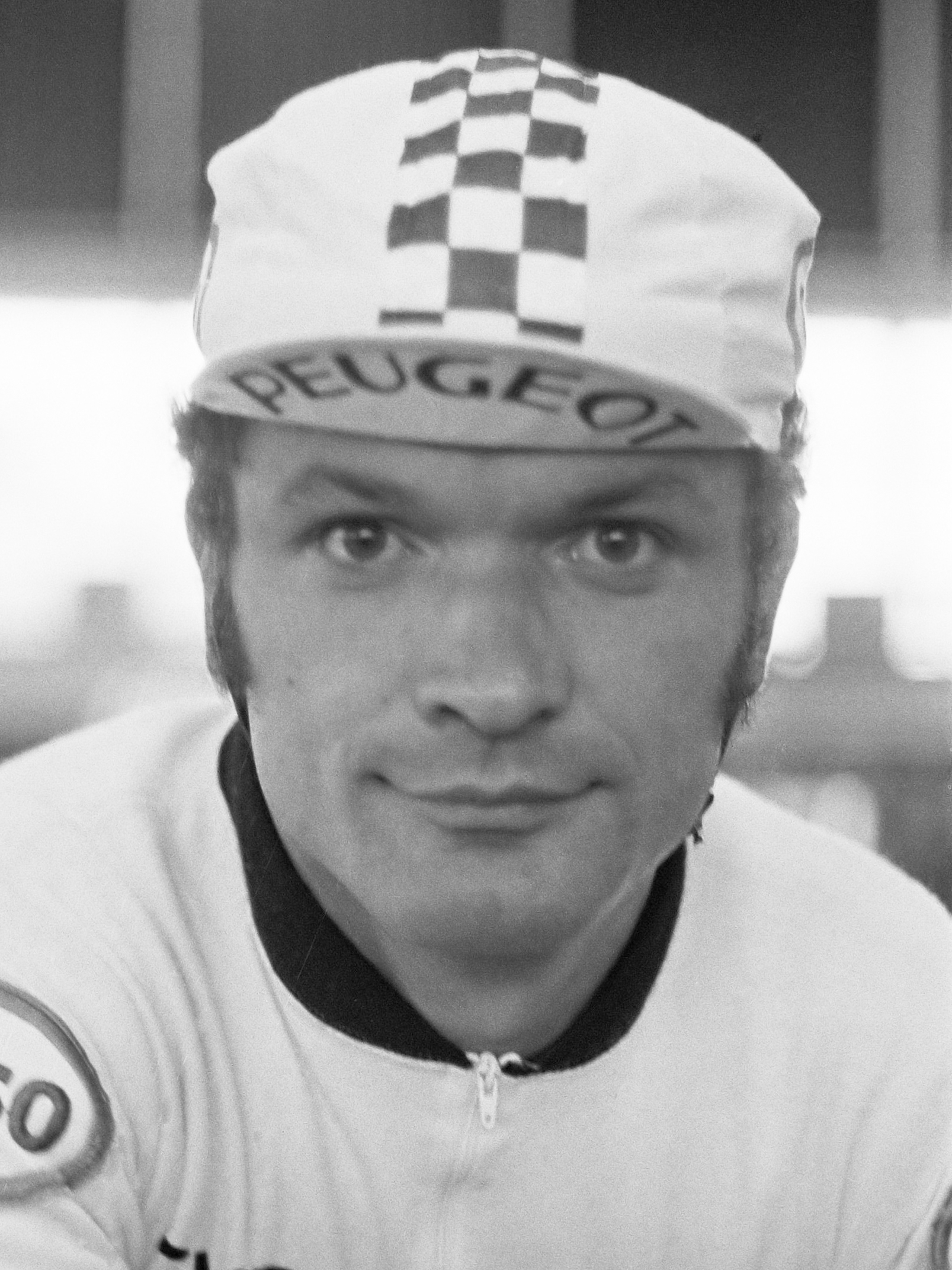
Bernard Thévenet (pictured in 1978), winner of the general classification

The prologue was won by Dietrich Thurau, who made his debut in the Tour. Thurau wanted to be the leader when the Tour would enter his native Germany in stage 13. In the second stage, big mountains were scheduled, unusually early in the race, and Thurau saw this as the biggest threat to this goal. When Van Impe, Thévenet and Kuiper were away leaving Thurau behind, Thurau worked together with Merckx, and they were able to reach the leaders, and Thurau was able to win the sprint. The second part of the fifth stage was a time trial. Eddy Merckx, at that moment only 8 seconds behind Thurau, was expected to win enough time on Thurau to become the new leader, but surprisingly Thurau won the time trial, and extended his lead.

Thurau was able to keep control of the race for the next stages, and when the Tour entered Germany, he was still leading the race, 51 seconds ahead of Merckx.

Prior to the start of the second part of stage 15, an individual climbing time trial, Thurau was 0:51 ahead of Merckx with Thévenet in third place at 1:22, Kuiper in fourth at 1:40, in fifth was Alain Meslet, Van Impe was in sixth at 2:31 and Zoetemelk clinging to the Top 10 at 3:40. This hill climb up the Avoriaz would separate the handful of riders with a legitimate chance winning the general classification from the rest of the field as the Tour entered its third and final week.

The stage was won by Zoetemelk, with Van Impe being placed second as Thévenet claimed third twenty seconds behind Van Impe. Merckx finished nearly two minutes behind Zoetemelk in tenth place and while Thurau finished outside the Top 10, he, perhaps surprisingly, did not fall out of contention as he now was in second place in the general classification, 0:11 behind the new leader Bernard Thévenet.

With a hilly stage, there were two major mountain stages over the next three days, which would decide the 1977 Tour de France, Merckx at 0:25 back, Van Impe at 0:33, Kuiper at 0:49 and Zoetemelk moved from 10th to 6th place just over one minute behind Thévenet. With four of the riders and the two outsiders of Kuiper and Thurau within about a minute, it was clear the Tour was not decided yet and the upcoming mountains were going to be exciting.

In stage 16, these attacks blew apart the entire Peloton as the elite contenders separated themselves from everybody else in the field. Initially Didi Thurau was dropped with the domestiques, breakaway hopefuls and sprinters but he was able to fight his way back to the point where he could see the group of elite riders at the base of the final climb. From there he would rejoin the group on the descent, maneuver his way to the front and actually beat everybody in the sprint to gut out an impressive stage win all while keeping himself in contention for the overall lead. Anyone not in this front group of elite riders pretty much lost their chance at winning the Tour, with the exception of Eddy Merckx, as he was dropped, but was still within about three minutes of Thévenet in seventh place overall and while for most any other rider a gap of more than three minutes this late in the race would be all but impossible to overcome with six riders ahead of him, for Merckx nothing was impossible and nobody would have been surprised if he somehow found a way to win this Tour. The new sixth place rider Francisco Galdós was able to stay with the other main contenders and moved ahead of Merckx.

The overall situation between Thévenet, Thurau, Van Impe, Kuiper and Zoetemelk remained the same headed into stage 17, which included a grueling finish atop Alpe d'Huez. Well into stage 17 Lucien Van Impe saw an opportunity to attack and took it separating himself from the general classification contenders building more than a minute gap to the point that he was virtually leading the general classification by the time he reached the bottom of the climb on Alpe d'Huez. This put Thévenet in the position where he now had to give chase or lose the lead.

Raymond Martin, Merckx, Thurau, Raymond Delisle, Michel Laurent, Sebastian Pozo and Joaquim Agostinho were among the elite group of riders when the counterattack against Van Impe came. While these riders finished considerably ahead of the rest of the field it was only Kuiper, Galdos and Zoetemelk who were able to go with Thévenet as he rode away from everyone else in pursuit of Van Impe. These riders made Thévenet defend his first position in the general classification, and do all of the work while riding in his slipstream, at no time coming to the front to take a pull of the heavy climbing work.

Thévenet was determined to win his second Tour de France, just as Van Impe showed his determination to repeat as champion when he launched his early attack, although for Van Impe it was out of the ordinary, being as ordinarily he would be racing for the mountains classification points. Fortunately for Thévenet his hard work was paying off as the gap between Van Impe and the first chase group began to close, but as he was reeling in one opponent he was also bringing two other opponents along with him and not just bringing them along but putting them in position to attack his position in the general classification as he was the one doing all the work. Naturally Kuiper and Zoetemelk were both determined to earn their first ever Tour victory so they didn't think twice about forcing Thévenet to lead the way in chasing down Lucien Van Impe.

Before long the gap had become small enough that the television and official cars riding behind Van Impe had to move out of the way as it was beginning to look as though this hard charging chase group would catch the leader before the finish line. One of these cars ended up hitting Van Impe severely damaging his bike in the process and while he tried to continue riding it just wasn't possible. As a result, he was stuck waiting and watching for the team car to appear around the corner to repair his wheel or get him a new bike but unfortunately two of the riders closest to him in the standings appeared before his team car did and raced right on by. By the end of the stage Zoetemelk and Francisco Galdós had been dropped when Hennie Kuiper launched an attack as Thévenet was digging deeper and pushing harder than he ever had in his whole life, not so much to take advantage of Van Impe's misfortune, although this certainly worked to his benefit, but to chase down Hennie Kuiper who was up the road by himself headed for the finish line so close to him in the standings that he could take over the yellow jersey as leader of the general classification.

Thévenet was enraged with Kuiper for making him to do all the work chasing down Van Impe and then attacking in an attempt to take the first place in the general classification and had to push himself to his absolute breaking point in order to cross the finish line second place to Kuiper 0:41 behind.

Despite being hit by a motorist, Van Impe ended up 2:06 behind Kuiper while still finishing ahead of everybody else in the race. Galdos crossed at 2:59, Zoetemelk crossed more than four minutes later as the second level of the top tier riders including Laurent, Pozo, Martin and Pedro Torres started filtering across the line more than eight minutes behind Kuiper.

By the end of the day the devastation wrought on the peloton was complete as 30 riders were thrown out of the race for finishing outside the time limit set by Thévenet, Zoetemelk, Kuiper, Galdos and especially Van Impe for forcing the pace. At this point these five riders were the only ones with a realistic chance at victory as Thévenet kept his lead by a minuscule 0:08 over Hennie Kuiper while Lucien Van Impe was still in contention in third place 1:59 behind as Galdos and Zoetemelk were about four and five minutes behind respectively.

While all the main contenders passed the doping controls following stage 17 it was later learned that Zoetemelk had tested positive following his time trial victory in the second part of stage 15. Doping was appearing to be a bit more commonplace than officials or fans realised, which contributed to a more relaxed rider culture on the subject. After he retired Thévenet would admit that he doped when he won the 1975 Tour de France as well as in other editions just as numerous other riders had.

In stage 18, Joaquim Agostinho initially won the day after launching a breakaway that finished about eight minutes ahead of everyone else in the field except for Antonio Menéndez, who finished 3:17 behind him, and Eddy Merckx who finished 3:20 back. Agostinho and Menendez both failed doping controls while Merckx was not tested (the testing protocol tested the stage winner, runner up, race leader and two other randomly selected cyclists). Agostinho's penalty would cost him in the end as he would finish outside the top 10 because of it. There were no major changes at the top of the general classification as all attacks and counterattacks were answered by the group and they all finished with the same time.

Typically after the final mountain stage there is one last chance to gain time in the overall classification with an individual time trial, but in this year's edition there were two ITT's to decide the final winner of the general classification. One typical incredibly challenging 50 km course around Dijon in stage 20 and one similar to an initial prologue during the split stage 22A which was around the Champs-Élysées prior to the circuit finish in 22B.

During the stage 20 time trial only seven riders of the decimated main field were able to finish within three minutes of eventual stage winner Bernard Thévenet. Of these seven only fourth-place finisher Gerrie Knetemann and fifth place Joseph Bruyere were not in the top 10 of the general classification. Didi Thurau came in second 0:23 behind and while Hennie Kuiper put in an incredibly strong ride he was not able to outperform Thévenet as he was 0:28 slower in third place, but still firmly in command of second place in the general classification, now 0:36 back. While Agostinho, Merckx and Van Impe each put in a strong time trial by this point in the race Van Impe was in third at 3:22 back so realistically, with only one short time trial and one and a half flat stages remaining, only Kuiper had even the slightest chance of overtaking Thévenet and this didn't seem likely as Thévenet had just defeated Kuiper.

Stage 21 was a flat stage where three riders managed to either survive a breakaway, or launch a late break to stay away from the peloton and finish 0:19 ahead of the main field. Being as Jacques Esclassan had a commanding lead in the points classification over Giacinto Santambrogio, Didi Thurau and sixth place sprinter Barry Hoban the escape made by Joop Zoetemelk, Michel Laurent and stage winner Gerrie Knetemann did nothing to change any of the classifications although it was another strong performance by Knetemann who would win ten Tour stages in his career and also be instrumental in helping Zoetemelk win the 1980 Tour de France along with ten time stage winner Jan Raas.

Stage 22A was the final opportunity to change the overall classification although in a time trial this short making up gaps of even over 0:20 was all but impossible, let alone the 0:37 Kuiper would need to overtake Thévenet. In the end Thévenet would add twelve seconds to his lead officially securing his overall victory in the 1977 Tour de France. Impressively in Stage 22B, Alain Meslet would survive a breakaway and finish nearly a minute ahead of the main field to win on the Champs-Élysées.

The podium ended up with Bernard Thévenet winning his 2nd Tour de France, followed by Hennie Kuiper in 2nd and Lucien Van Impe, who also won another mountains classification.

=== Doping ===
Every day, five cyclists were tested for doping: the leader in the general classification, the winner of the stage, the runner-up of the stage, and two randomly selected cyclists, for a total of 110 tests. Six cyclists tested positive for Pemoline: Joop Zoetemelk (15th stage), Sebastien Pozo (16th stage), Antonio Menéndez (17th and 18th stage), Joaquim Agostinho (18th stage), Fernando Mendes (18th stage) and Luis Ocaña (18th stage). Pozo was unable to provide urine within two hours for the doping control after the prologue, which is treated as a positive result. All were fined with 1000 Swiss Francs, received one month of provisional suspension, were set back to the last place in the stage and penalised with 10 minutes in the general classification.

Directly after the Tour, there were rumours about Thévenet and Kuiper having used doping. The Tour officials came together, and made a statement that Thévenet was officially the winner of the Tour. Some months later, when Thévenet was in hospital, he admitted having used cortisone. His popularity plunged after that, and Thévenet was never again able to compete for the general classification. Though he was able to stay near the second tier general classification riders approaching the end of his career as he finished in the top 20 of both the 1980 Tour de France and Vuelta.

== Classification leadership and minor prizes ==
There were several classifications in the 1977 Tour de France, four of them awarding jerseys to their leaders. The most important was the general classification, calculated by adding each cyclist's finishing times on each stage. The cyclist with the least accumulated time was the race leader, identified by the yellow jersey; the winner of this classification is considered the winner of the Tour.

Additionally, there was a points classification, where cyclists got points for finishing among the best in a stage finish, or in intermediate sprints. The cyclist with the most points lead the classification, and was identified with a green jersey.

There was also a mountains classification. The organisation had categorised some climbs as either first, second, third, or fourth-category; points for this classification were won by the first cyclists that reached the top of these climbs first, with more points available for the higher-categorised climbs. The cyclist with the most points lead the classification, and wore a white jersey with red polka dots.

Another classification was the young rider classification. This was decided the same way as the general classification, but only neo-professionals were eligible, and the leader wore a white jersey.

The fifth individual classification was the intermediate sprints classification. This classification had similar rules as the points classification, but only points were awarded on intermediate sprints. In 1977, this classification had no associated jersey.

For the team classification, the times of the best three cyclists per team on each stage were added; the leading team was the team with the lowest total time. The riders in the team that led this classification were identified by yellow caps. There was also a team points classification. Cyclists received points according to their finishing position on each stage, with the first rider receiving one point. The first three finishers of each team had their points combined, and the team with the fewest points led the classification. The riders of the team leading this classification wore green caps.

In addition, there was a combativity award, in which a jury composed of journalists gave points after certain stages to the cyclist they considered most combative. The split stages each had a combined winner. At the conclusion of the Tour, Gerrie Knetemann won the overall super-combativity award, also decided by journalists. The Souvenir Henri Desgrange was given in honour of Tour founder Henri Desgrange to the first rider to pass the summit of the Col du Tourmalet on stage 2. This prize was won by Lucien Van Impe.

Classification leadership by stage
Stage	Stage winner	General classification	Points classification	Mountains classification	Young rider classification	Intermediate sprints classification	Team classifications		Combativity award
Stage	Stage winner	General classification	Points classification	Mountains classification	Young rider classification	Intermediate sprints classification	By time	By points	Combativity award
P	Dietrich Thurau	Dietrich Thurau	Dietrich Thurau	no award	Dietrich Thurau	no award	TI–Raleigh	TI–Raleigh	no award
1	Pierre-Raymond Villemiane	Dietrich Thurau	Jacques Esclassan	Jullio Rossi	Dietrich Thurau	Pierre-Raymond Villemiane	TI–Raleigh	TI–Raleigh	André Romero
2	Dietrich Thurau	Dietrich Thurau	Dietrich Thurau	Hennie Kuiper	Dietrich Thurau	Pierre-Raymond Villemiane	Miko–Mercier–Vivagel	TI–Raleigh	Charles Rouxel
3	José Nazabal	Dietrich Thurau	Dietrich Thurau	Lucien Van Impe	Dietrich Thurau	Pierre-Raymond Villemiane	Miko–Mercier–Vivagel	TI–Raleigh	José Nazabal
4	Régis Delépine	Dietrich Thurau	Jacques Esclassan	Lucien Van Impe	Dietrich Thurau	Pierre-Raymond Villemiane	Miko–Mercier–Vivagel	TI–Raleigh	Régis Delépine
5a	Jacques Esclassan	Dietrich Thurau	Jacques Esclassan	Lucien Van Impe	Dietrich Thurau	Rik Van Linden	Miko–Mercier–Vivagel	TI–Raleigh	Jean Chassang
5b	Dietrich Thurau	Dietrich Thurau	Jacques Esclassan	Lucien Van Impe	Dietrich Thurau	Rik Van Linden	Miko–Mercier–Vivagel	TI–Raleigh	Jean Chassang
6	Jan Raas	Dietrich Thurau	Jacques Esclassan	Lucien Van Impe	Dietrich Thurau	Rik Van Linden	Miko–Mercier–Vivagel	Peugeot–Esso–Michelin	
7a	Patrick Sercu	Dietrich Thurau	Jacques Esclassan	Lucien Van Impe	Dietrich Thurau	Rik Van Linden	Miko–Mercier–Vivagel	TI–Raleigh	no award
7b	Fiat France	Dietrich Thurau	Jacques Esclassan	Lucien Van Impe	Dietrich Thurau	Rik Van Linden	Miko–Mercier–Vivagel	TI–Raleigh	no award
8	Giacinto Santambrogio	Dietrich Thurau	Rik Van Linden	Lucien Van Impe	Dietrich Thurau	Rik Van Linden	Miko–Mercier–Vivagel	Peugeot–Esso–Michelin	Maurice Le Guilloux
9	Klaus-Peter Thaler	Dietrich Thurau	Rik Van Linden	Lucien Van Impe	Dietrich Thurau	Rik Van Linden	TI–Raleigh	Peugeot–Esso–Michelin	Eddy Merckx
10	Fedor den Hertog	Dietrich Thurau	Rik Van Linden	Lucien Van Impe	Dietrich Thurau	Rik Van Linden	TI–Raleigh	Peugeot–Esso–Michelin	Dietrich Thurau
11	Jean-Pierre Danguillaume	Dietrich Thurau	Rik Van Linden	Lucien Van Impe	Dietrich Thurau	Rik Van Linden	TI–Raleigh	Peugeot–Esso–Michelin	Joseph Bruyère
12	Patrick Sercu	Dietrich Thurau	Rik Van Linden	Lucien Van Impe	Dietrich Thurau	Rik Van Linden	TI–Raleigh	Peugeot–Esso–Michelin	Patrick Sercu
13a	Patrick Sercu	Dietrich Thurau	Rik Van Linden	Lucien Van Impe	Dietrich Thurau	Rik Van Linden	TI–Raleigh	Peugeot–Esso–Michelin	Jean-Pierre Danguillaume
13b	Jean-Pierre Danguillaume	Dietrich Thurau	Rik Van Linden	Lucien Van Impe	Dietrich Thurau	Rik Van Linden	TI–Raleigh	Peugeot–Esso–Michelin	Jean-Pierre Danguillaume
14	Bernard Quilfen	Dietrich Thurau	Jacques Esclassan	Lucien Van Impe	Dietrich Thurau	Rik Van Linden	TI–Raleigh	Peugeot–Esso–Michelin	Bernard Vallet
15a	Paul Wellens	Dietrich Thurau	Jacques Esclassan	Lucien Van Impe	Dietrich Thurau	Pierre-Raymond Villemiane	TI–Raleigh	Peugeot–Esso–Michelin	Paul Wellens
15b	Lucien Van Impe	Bernard Thévenet	Jacques Esclassan	Lucien Van Impe	Dietrich Thurau	Pierre-Raymond Villemiane	TI–Raleigh	Peugeot–Esso–Michelin	Paul Wellens
16	Dietrich Thurau	Bernard Thévenet	Jacques Esclassan	Lucien Van Impe	Dietrich Thurau	Pierre-Raymond Villemiane	TI–Raleigh	Peugeot–Esso–Michelin	Dietrich Thurau
17	Hennie Kuiper	Bernard Thévenet	Jacques Esclassan	Lucien Van Impe	Dietrich Thurau	Pierre-Raymond Villemiane	TI–Raleigh	Peugeot–Esso–Michelin	Jacques Esclassan
18	no winner	Bernard Thévenet	Jacques Esclassan	Lucien Van Impe	Dietrich Thurau	Pierre-Raymond Villemiane	Kas–Campagnolo	Peugeot–Esso–Michelin	Eddy Merckx
19	Gerrie Knetemann	Bernard Thévenet	Jacques Esclassan	Lucien Van Impe	Dietrich Thurau	Pierre-Raymond Villemiane	Miko–Mercier–Vivagel	Peugeot–Esso–Michelin	Gerrie Knetemann
20	Bernard Thévenet	Bernard Thévenet	Jacques Esclassan	Lucien Van Impe	Dietrich Thurau	Pierre-Raymond Villemiane	TI–Raleigh	Peugeot–Esso–Michelin	no award
21	Gerrie Knetemann	Bernard Thévenet	Jacques Esclassan	Lucien Van Impe	Dietrich Thurau	Pierre-Raymond Villemiane	TI–Raleigh	Peugeot–Esso–Michelin	
22a	Dietrich Thurau	Bernard Thévenet	Jacques Esclassan	Lucien Van Impe	Dietrich Thurau	Pierre-Raymond Villemiane	TI–Raleigh	Peugeot–Esso–Michelin	
22b	Alain Meslet	Bernard Thévenet	Jacques Esclassan	Lucien Van Impe	Dietrich Thurau	Pierre-Raymond Villemiane	TI–Raleigh	Peugeot–Esso–Michelin	
Final		Bernard Thévenet	Jacques Esclassan	Lucien Van Impe	Dietrich Thurau	Pierre-Raymond Villemiane	TI–Raleigh–McGregor	Peugeot–Esso–Michelin	Gerrie Knetemann

== Final standings ==
Legend
A yellow jersey.	Denotes the winner of the general classification	A green jersey.	Denotes the winner of the points classification
A white jersey with red polka dots.	Denotes the winner of the mountains classification	A white jersey.	Denotes the winner of the young rider classification

=== General classification ===
Final general classification (1–10)
Rank	Rider	Team	Time
1	Bernard Thévenet (FRA)	Peugeot–Esso–Michelin	115h 38' 30"
2	Hennie Kuiper (NED)	TI–Raleigh	+ 0' 48"
3	Lucien Van Impe (BEL)	Lejeune–BP	+ 3' 32"
4	Francisco Galdós (ESP)	Kas–Campagnolo	+ 7' 45"
5	Dietrich Thurau (FRG)	TI–Raleigh	+ 12' 24"
6	Eddy Merckx (BEL)	Fiat France	+ 12' 38"
7	Michel Laurent (FRA)	Peugeot–Esso–Michelin	+ 17' 42"
8	Joop Zoetemelk (NED)	Miko–Mercier–Vivagel	+ 19' 22"
9	Raymond Delisle (FRA)	Miko–Mercier–Vivagel	+ 21' 32"
10	Alain Meslet (FRA)	Gitane–Campagnolo	+ 27' 31"

Final general classification (11–53)
Rank	Rider	Team	Time
11	Raymond Martin (FRA)	Miko–Mercier–Vivagel	+ 28' 35"
12	Bert Pronk (NED)	TI–Raleigh	+ 30' 06"
13	Joaquim Agostinho (POR)	Teka	+ 33' 13"
14	Gonzalo Aja (ESP)	Teka	+ 36' 11"
15	Pierre-Raymond Villemiane (FRA)	Gitane–Campagnolo	+ 36' 42"
16	José Martins (POR)	Kas–Campagnolo	+ 38' 53"
17	Edouard Janssens (BEL)	Fiat France	+ 46' 13"
18	Enrique Martinez (ESP)	Kas–Campagnolo	+ 47' 30"
19	Pedro Torres (ESP)	Teka	+ 47' 39"
20	Bernard Vallet (FRA)	Miko–Mercier–Vivagel	+ 48' 41"
21	Ferdinand Julien (FRA)	Lejeune–BP	+ 49' 32"
22	Christian Seznec (FRA)	Miko–Mercier–Vivagel	+ 51' 39"
23	Vicente López Carril (ESP)	Kas–Campagnolo	+ 52' 46"
24	Régis Ovion (FRA)	Peugeot–Esso–Michelin	+ 54' 55"
25	Luis Ocaña (ESP)	Frisol–Thirion–Gazelle	+ 1h 02' 09"
26	Henk Lubberding (NED)	TI–Raleigh	+ 1h 02' 13"
27	Fernando Mendes (POR)	Teka	+ 1h 02' 36"
28	Jacques Esclassan (FRA)	Peugeot–Esso–Michelin	+ 1h 02' 54"
29	Jos De Schoenmaecker (BEL)	Fiat France	+ 1h 08' 11"
30	Paul Wellens (BEL)	Frisol–Thirion–Gazelle	+ 1h 08' 12"
31	Gerrie Knetemann (NED)	TI–Raleigh	+ 1h 11' 23"
32	José Enrique Cima (ESP)	Kas–Campagnolo	+ 1h 15' 30"
33	Roland Berland (FRA)	Gitane–Campagnolo	+ 1h 15' 41"
34	Bernard Bourreau (FRA)	Peugeot–Esso–Michelin	+ 1h 23' 07"
35	Jean-Pierre Danguillaume (FRA)	Peugeot–Esso–Michelin	+ 1h 25' 37"
36	Eugène Plet (FRA)	Lejeune–BP	+ 1h 25' 50"
37	Roger Legeay (FRA)	Lejeune–BP	+ 1h 33' 11"
38	Giovanni Cavalcanti (ITA)	Bianchi–Campagnolo	+ 1h 33' 57"
39	Giacinto Santambrogio (ITA)	Bianchi–Campagnolo	+ 1h 35' 24"
40	Guy Sibille (FRA)	Peugeot–Esso–Michelin	+ 1h 36' 43"
41	Barry Hoban (GBR)	Miko–Mercier–Vivagel	+ 1h 39' 30"
42	André Chalmel (FRA)	Gitane–Campagnolo	+ 1h 44' 06"
43	Michel Le Denmat (FRA)	Lejeune–BP	+ 1h 44' 46"
44	Andrès Gandarias (ESP)	Teka	+ 1h 49' 48"
45	Antonio Menéndez (ESP)	Kas–Campagnolo	+ 1h 50' 38"
46	José De Cauwer (BEL)	TI–Raleigh	+ 1h 56' 01"
47	Luis Balagué (ESP)	Teka	+ 2h 01' 58"
48	Jos Huysmans (BEL)	Fiat France	+ 2h 06' 49"
49	Willy Singer (FRG)	Bianchi–Campagnolo	+ 2h 08' 06"
50	Robert Bouloux (FRA)	Fiat France	+ 2h 12' 55"
51	Cees Bal (NED)	Fiat France	+ 2h 22' 18"
52	Gerben Karstens (NED)	TI–Raleigh	+ 2h 23' 47"
53	Roger Loysch (BEL)	Frisol–Thirion–Gazelle	+ 2h 24' 08"

=== Points classification ===
Final points classification (1–10)
Rank	Rider	Team	Points
1	Jacques Esclassan (FRA)	Peugeot–Esso–Michelin	236
2	Giacinto Santambrogio (ITA)	Bianchi–Campagnolo	140
3	Dietrich Thurau (FRG)	TI–Raleigh	137
4	Pierre-Raymond Villemiane (FRA)	Gitane–Campagnolo	128
5	Eddy Merckx (BEL)	Fiat France	93
6	Barry Hoban (GBR)	Miko–Mercier–Vivagel	91
7	Hennie Kuiper (NED)	TI–Raleigh	76
8	Bernard Thévenet (FRA)	Peugeot–Esso–Michelin	65
9	Jean-Pierre Danguillaume (FRA)	Peugeot–Esso–Michelin	61
10	Lucien Van Impe (BEL)	Lejeune–BP	60

=== Mountains classification ===
Final mountains classification (1–10)
Rank	Rider	Team	Points
1	Lucien Van Impe (BEL)	Lejeune–BP	244
2	Hennie Kuiper (NED)	TI–Raleigh	174
3	Pedro Torres (ESP)	Teka	143
4	Bernard Thévenet (FRA)	Peugeot–Esso–Michelin	114
5	Joop Zoetemelk (NED)	Miko–Mercier–Vivagel	80
6	Francisco Galdós (ESP)	Kas–Campagnolo	53
7	Antonio Menéndez (ESP)	Kas–Campagnolo	52
8	Joaquim Agostinho (POR)	Teka	42
9	Dietrich Thurau (FRG)	TI–Raleigh	42
10	Raymond Delisle (FRA)	Miko–Mercier–Vivagel	42

=== Young rider classification ===
Final young rider classification (1–10)
Rank	Rider	Team	Time
1	Dietrich Thurau (FRG)	TI–Raleigh	115h 50' 54"
2	Alain Meslet (FRA)	Gitane–Campagnolo	+ 15' 07"
3	Pierre-Raymond Villemiane (FRA)	Gitane–Campagnolo	+ 24' 18"
4	Enrique Martínez Heredia (ESP)	Kas–Campagnolo	+ 35' 06"
5	Henk Lubberding (NED)	TI–Raleigh	+ 49' 49"
6	Paul Wellens (BEL)	Frisol–Thirion–Gazelle	+ 55' 48"
7	José Enrique Cima (ESP)	Kas–Campagnolo	+ 1h 04' 06"
8	Eugène Plet (FRA)	Lejeune–BP	+ 1h 13' 26"
9	Michel Le Denmat (FRA)	Lejeune–BP	+ 1h 32' 22"
10	Willy Singer (FRG)	Bianchi–Campagnolo	+ 1h 55' 54"

=== Intermediate sprints classification ===
Final intermediate sprints classification (1–10)
Rank	Rider	Team	Points
1	Pierre-Raymond Villemiane (FRA)	Gitane–Campagnolo	73
2	Giacinto Santambrogio (ITA)	Bianchi–Campagnolo	49
3	Jacques Esclassan (FRA)	Peugeot–Esso–Michelin	32
4	Jean-Pierre Danguillaume (FRA)	Peugeot–Esso–Michelin	16
5	Roland Berland (FRA)	Gitane–Campagnolo	9
6	Gerrie Knetemann (NED)	TI–Raleigh	9
7	Joop Zoetemelk (NED)	Miko–Mercier–Vivagel	8
8	Wilfried Wesemael (BEL)	Frisol–Thirion–Gazelle	7
9	José Martins (POR)	Kas–Campagnolo	8
10	Fernando Mendes (POR)	Teka	6

=== Team classification ===
Final team classification (1–10)
Rank	Team	Time
1	TI–Raleigh	347h 41' 19"
2	Miko–Mercier–Vivagel	+ 13' 29"
3	Kas–Campagnolo	+ 20' 45"
4	Peugeot–Esso–Michelin	+ 25' 02"
5	Teka	+ 56' 19"
6	Fiat France	+ 1h 08' 05"
7	Lejeune–BP	+ 1h 14' 06"
8	Gitane–Campagnolo	+ 1h 28' 30"
9	Frisol–Thirion–Gazelle	+ 3h 05' 34"
10	Bianchi–Campagnolo	+ 3h 54' 06"

=== Team points classification ===
Final team points classification (1–10)
Rank	Team	Points
1	Peugeot–Esso–Michelin	820
2	TI–Raleigh	966
3	Miko–Mercier–Vivagel	1326
4	Gitane–Campagnolo	1384
5	Teka	1559
6	Fiat France	1768
7	Kas–Campagnolo	2013
8	Frisol–Thirion–Gazelle	2141
9	Bianchi–Campagnolo	2182
10	Lejeune–BP	2227

== Aftermath ==
Due to the relentless pace set by the top tier riders only 53 riders were able to finish the 1977 Tour de France. Never since have so few riders finished a Tour de France and the previous time fewer riders finished was the 1950 Tour de France when 51 riders finished. In years before and after this Tour riders like Merckx, Hinault, Zoetemelk, Van Impe, Thévenet, Luis Ocaña and Laurent Fignon set such a high pace during mountain stages that as many as half the riders in the main field would have been expelled from the race, but exemptions were made and the time limit was altered to allow them to continue the Tour. No such exemptions were given in the 1977 edition.

Due to doping infractions by another rider Meslet would go from 11th to 10th place overall, Raymond Delisle finished 9th, Zoetemelk ended up in 8th overall because of the ten minute penalty, which impressively enough would be the worst he would ever finish until his 13th participation in 1983. Michel Laurent moved up into 7th place overall as Merckx would finish his final Grand Tour a career worst 6th, with it also being one of the few Grand Tours he entered that he did not win.

The immediate aftermath of this Tour was that it was the end of the Merckx era and the last time Thévenet and Van Impe would be in legitimate contention of winning the Tour de France while the 1978 Tour de France would be the beginning of three consecutive years where Joop Zoetemelk and Bernard Hinault would basically race against one another while everybody else fought for third place.

Like Meslet this would be the finest Tour Dietrich Thurau would ever race finishing in 5th place overall. While Klaus-Peter Thaler would wear the yellow jersey in 1978 the next German to wear the yellow jersey and be in contention of winning the Tour de France would not come for nearly two decades with Jan Ullrich.

Spaniard Francisco Galdós earned fourth place overall as he found a way to stay with the elite riders every single time it mattered. Due to a tough break Lucien Van Impe finished third and because he caught some breaks and wanted it more than anyone Hennie Kuiper made it a two-way race between himself and Thévenet by the end of the Tour.

Hennie Kuiper would never win the Tour and the 1977 Tour was the closest he ever came, although he did finish second one additional time in the 1980 Tour. After retiring in 1988 he would go on to complete many more Tours from a team car and would work in public relations. In the early 1990s he was worked for Team Motorola and would end up giving a young Lance Armstrong very excited instructions in his formative professional years. After leaving Motorola in 1996 he would be hired by Team Rabobank.

== Bibliography ==
- Augendre, Jacques (2016). "Guide historique" [Historical guide] (PDF). Tour de France (in French). Paris: Amaury Sport Organisation. Archived (PDF) from the original on 17 August 2016.
- Duniecq, Jacques (1977). Tour de France 1977. Keighley, UK: Kennedy Brothers Publishing. OCLC 921023761.
- McGann, Bill; McGann, Carol (2008). The Story of the Tour de France: 1965–2007. Vol. 2. Indianapolis: Dog Ear Publishing. ISBN 978-1-59858-608-4.
- Nauright, John; Parrish, Charles (2012). Sports Around the World: History, Culture, and Practice. Vol. 2. Santa Barbara, California: ABC-CLIO. ISBN 978-1-59884-300-2.
- van den Akker, Pieter (2018). Tour de France Rules and Statistics: 1903–2018. Self-published. ISBN 978-1-79398-080-9.
