= Sebastián Pozo =

Spanish cyclist

Personal information
- Born: 7 April 1951 (age 75)

Cycling career
- Sport: Cycling
- Role: Rider

Sebastián Pozo (born 7 April 1951) is a Spanish racing cyclist. He rode in the 1977 Tour de France.
