= Willy Singer =

German cyclist

Personal information
- Born: 23 February 1949 (age 77)

Cycling career
- Sport: Cycling
- Role: Rider

Willy Singer (born 23 February 1949) is a German racing cyclist. He rode in the 1977 Tour de France.
