= Fiat France (cycling team) =

Team information
- Registered: Belgium
- Founded: 1977
- Disbanded: 1977
- Discipline: Road
- Bicycles: Eddy Merckx Cycles

Key personnel
- General manager: Raphaël Géminiani; Robert Lelangue

Team name history
- 1977: Fiat France

Fiat France was a Belgian professional cycling team that existed in 1977. It was the successor to the Molteni team and the predecessor to the C&A team. It was sponsored by Fiat Automobiles.

== Team roster ==
The following is a list of riders on the Fiat France squad during the 1977 season, with age given for 1 January 1977.

Rider	Date of birth
Cees Bal (NED)	21 November 1951 (aged 25)
Robert Bouloux (FRA)	20 May 1947 (aged 29)
Joseph Bruyère (BEL)	5 October 1948 (aged 28)
Étienne De Beule (BEL)	20 November 1953 (aged 23)
Ludo Delcroix (BEL)	28 October 1950 (aged 26)
Jos Deschoenmaecker (BEL)	2 October 1947 (aged 29)
Bernard Draux (BEL)	11 May 1951 (aged 25)
Jean-Jacques Fussien (BEL)	21 January 1952 (aged 24)
Jos Huysmans (BEL)	18 December 1941 (aged 35)

Rider	Date of birth
Edward Janssens (BEL)	18 January 1946 (aged 30)
Jacques Martin (BEL)	16 April 1952 (aged 24)
Eddy Merckx (BEL)	17 June 1945 (aged 31)
Frans Mintjens (BEL)	23 November 1946 (aged 30)
Jean-Luc Bernard Molinéris (FRA)	25 August 1950 (aged 26)
Karel Rottiers (BEL)	7 April 1953 (aged 23)
Patrick Sercu (BEL)	27 June 1944 (aged 32)
Roger Swerts (BEL)	28 December 1942 (aged 34)
