= Eugène Plet =

French cyclist

Personal information
- Born: 7 February 1952 (age 74) Saint-Pierre-des-Landes, France

Cycling career
- Sport: Cycling
- Role: Rider

Eugène Plet (born 7 February 1952) is a French former professional racing cyclist. He rode in three editions of the Tour de France. His finished in tenth place on stage 8 of the 1977 Tour de France.
