= Antoine Gutierrez =

French cyclist

Personal information
- Born: 7 January 1953 (age 73) Morocco

Cycling career
- Sport: Cycling
- Role: Rider

Antoine Gutierrez (born 7 January 1953) is a French former professional racing cyclist. He rode in four editions of the Tour de France.
