= Gerrie Knetemann =

Dutch cyclist (1951–2004)

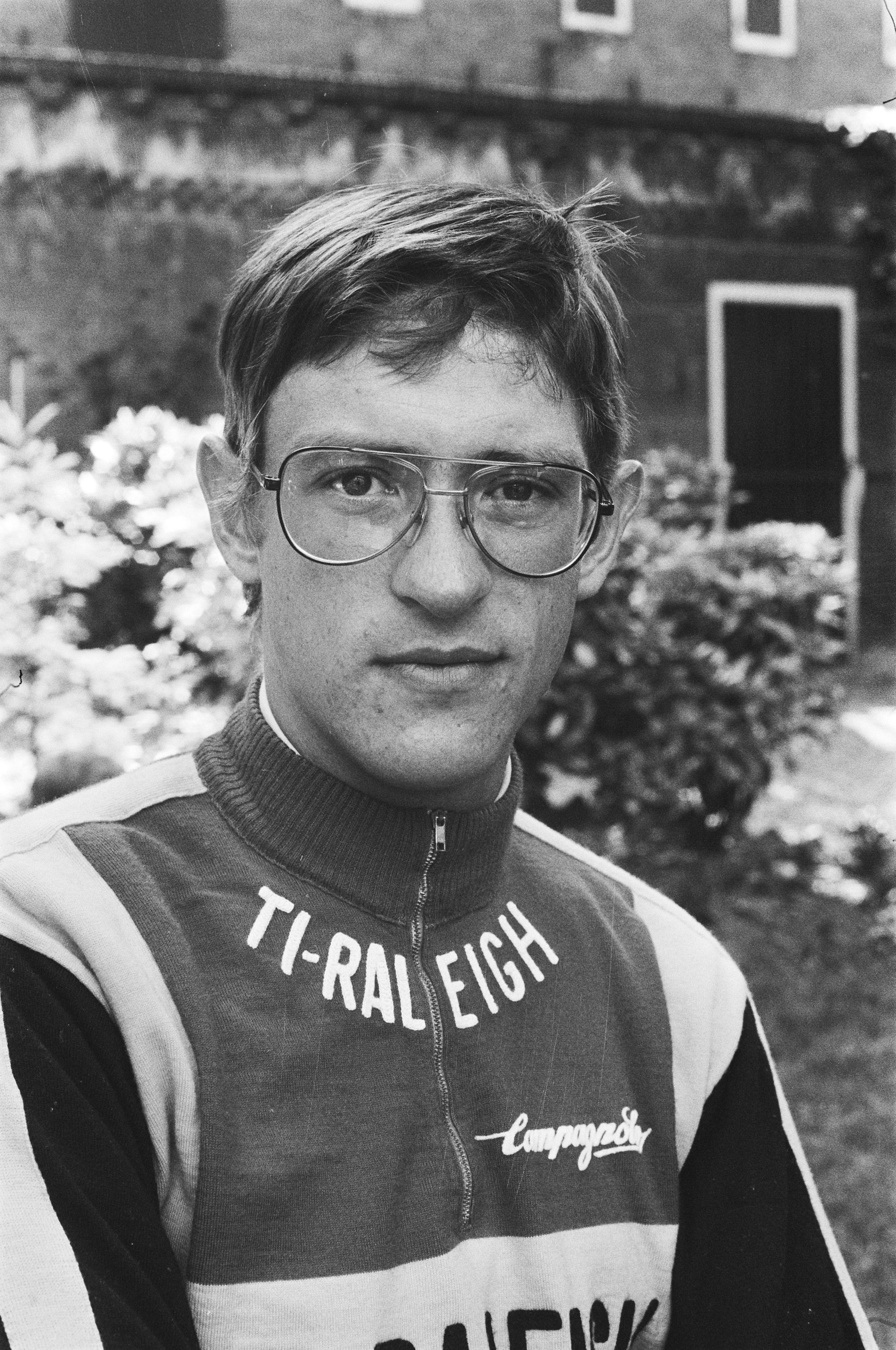
- Knetemann in 1977

Personal information
- Full name: Gerard Friedrich Knetemann
- Nickname: de Kneet
- Born: 6 March 1951 Amsterdam, Netherlands
- Died: 2 November 2004 (aged 53) Bergen, Netherlands

Cycling career
- Sport: Cycling
- Discipline: Road
- Role: Rider

Major wins
- Grand Tours Tour de France 10 individual stages (1975, 1977, 1978, 1979, 1980, 1982) Stage Races Paris–Nice (1978) Ronde van Nederland (1976, 1980, 1981, 1986) Tour Méditerranéen (1978, 1980, 1983) Vuelta a Andalucía (1976) Four Days of Dunkirk (1977) Three Days of De Panne (1982) Single-Day Races and Classics World Road Race Champion (1978) Amstel Gold Race (1974, 1985) Rund um den Henninger-Turm (1977)
Medal record
Men's road bicycle racing
Representing the Netherlands
World Championships
Gold medal – first place	1978 Nürburgring	Elite Men's Road Race

Gerard Friedrich Knetemann (6 March 1951 – 2 November 2004) was a Dutch road bicycle racer who won the 1978 World Championship. He wore the Yellow Jersey early in each Tour de France for four consecutive years between 1977 and 1980.

A four-time winner of the Ronde van Nederland, he also rode the Tour de France 11 times between 1974 and 1987, winning 10 stages, a Dutch record equalled only by Jan Raas and Joop Zoetemelk. Knetemann won 127 races as a professional.

Knetemann maintained an Amsterdam accent and a sharp sense of humour that made him a favourite with reporters and earned him television and radio appearances. His best year in the Tour de France was 1978, when he led from the sixth stage. Although he lost the leader's yellow jersey two days later, he won the stage into Lausanne and then the final stage on the Champs Elysées in Paris.

Together with Raas and his TI-Raleigh teammates Knetemann played a pivotal role in the victory of Zoetemelk in the 1980 Tour de France, one of the most dominating team performances in Tour de France history in which the team won twelve stages.

His career dwindled after a crash in Dwars door België in Belgium in March 1983.

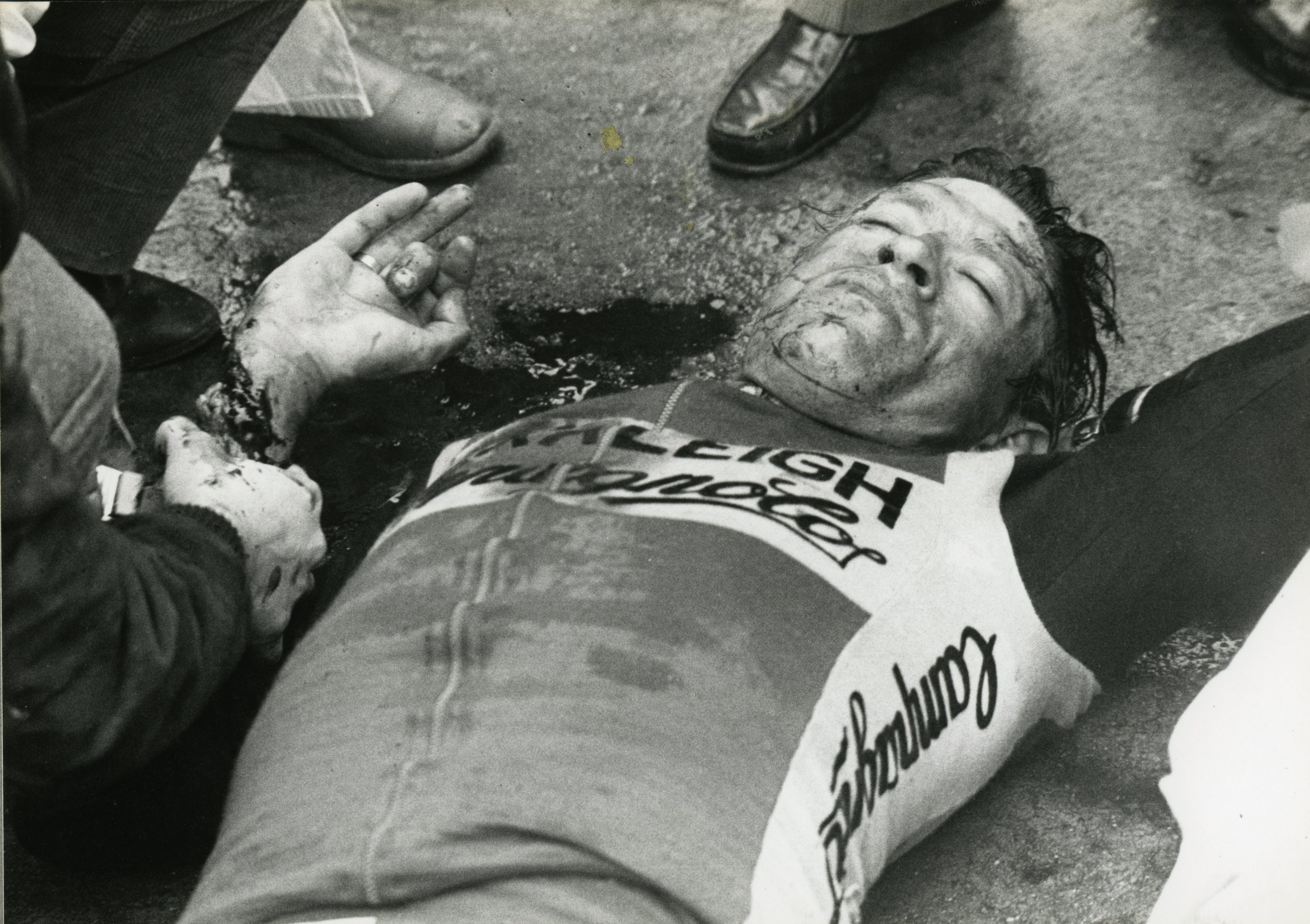
Knetemann after the crash at 1983 Dwars door België (collection KOERS Museum of Cycle Racing)

Recovery took months and, although he did again ride the Tour de France and win the Amstel Gold Race in 1985, he retired from racing in 1991 and became Dutch team selector.

Knetemann died in 2004 from a heart attack, while riding his bike with friends in De Schoorlse Duinen in Schoorl (gem. Bergen).

His wife, Gre Donker, was also a racing cyclist. They had a son and two daughters. Their daughter Roxane, born in 1987, was a professional cyclist as well.

== Teams ==
Knetemann raced for several different sponsored teams in his career, one of the most famous was the TI–Raleigh team, managed by Peter Post, with which he won the 1978 UCI Road World Championships.

== Career achievements ==
=== Major results ===
1971

- 1st Stage 3 Olympia's Tour

1974

- 1st Amstel Gold Race

1975

- 1st Stage 12 Tour de France
- 1st Stage 3 Tour de Romandie
- 2nd Overall Tour de Picardie
  - 1st Prologue

1976

- 1st Stage 5a (TTT) Tour de France
- 1st Overall Vuelta a Andalucía
  - 1st Stage 1a
  - 1st Stage 7a
- 1st Overall Ronde van Nederland
  - 1st Stage 4
- 1st Trofeo Zumaquero

1977

- 1st Stage 19 Tour de France
- 1st Stage 21 Tour de France
- 1st Overall Four Days of Dunkirk
- 1st Stage 3 Paris–Nice
- 1st Stage 6b Paris–Nice
- 1st Eschborn-Frankfurt City Loop

1978

- World Road Race Champion
- 1st Stage 4 (TTT) Tour de France
- 1st Stage 18 Tour de France
- 1st Stage 22 Tour de France
- 1st Overall Paris–Nice
  - 1st Stage 1
  - 1st Stage 2
  - 1st Stage 7b
- 1st Overall Tour Méditerranéen
  - 1st Stage 4b
- 1st Stage 5a Ronde van Nederland
- 1st Prologue Tour de Suisse
- 1st Grand Prix Pino Cerami
- 1st Ronde van Midden-Zeeland

1979

- 1st Prologue Tour de France
- 1st Stage 4 (TTT) Tour de France
- 1st Stage 8 (TTT) Tour de France
- 1st Stage 22 Tour de France
- 2nd Overall Ronde van Nederland
  - 1st Stage 1
- 3rd Overall Paris–Nice
  - 1st Prologue
- 1st Prologue Tour de Suisse
- 1st Stage 3a Tour de Suisse
- 1st Stage 6 Tour de Suisse
- 1st Stage 9b Tour de Suisse

1980

- 1st Stage 1b (TTT) Tour de France
- 1st Stage 7a (TTT) Tour de France
- 1st Stage 12 Tour de France
- 1st Overall Ronde van Nederland
- 1st Overall Tour Méditerranéen
  - 1st Prologue (victory shared with Jan Raas)
- 3rd Overall Paris–Nice
  - 1st Prologue
  - 1st Stage 7b
- 1st Overall Tour of Belgium
- 1st Ronde van Midden-Zeeland

1981

- 1st Stage 1b (TTT) Tour de France
- 1st Stage 4 (TTT) Tour de France
- 1st Overall Ronde van Nederland
  - 1st Stage 2b
- 1st Stage 5b Tour de Romandie
- 1st Nokere Koerse

1982

- 1st Stage 4 Tour de France
- 1st Stage 9a (TTT) Tour de France
- 1st Stage 11 Tour de France
- 2nd Overall Tirreno–Adriatico
  - 1st Prologue
  - 1st Stage 4
- 1st Overall Three Days of De Panne
  - 1st Stage 1b

1983

- 1st Overall Tour Méditerranéen
  - 1st Stage 4b
- GP de Costières du Gard

1984

- 1st Prologue Vuelta a Andalucía
- 1st Stage 5b Vuelta a Andalucía
- 1st Prologue Volta a la Comunitat Valenciana
- Grand Prix Pino Cerami

1985

- 1st Amstel Gold Race

1986

- 1st Overall Ronde van Nederland
  - 1st Stage 4b
- 1st Stage 2 Tour de Suisse

1987

- 1st Overall Tour of Sweden

== See also ==
- List of Dutch cyclists who have led the Tour de France general classification

Awards
Preceded by Hennie Kuiper	Dutch Sportsman of the Year; 1978	Succeeded by Jan Raas
