= Jean Chassang =

French cyclist

Personal information
- Born: 8 February 1951 (age 75) Désertines, Allier, France

Cycling career
- Sport: Cycling
- Role: Rider

Jean Chassang (born 8 February 1951) is a former French racing cyclist. His sporting career began with VC Sant Pourcain. He rode in six editions of the Tour de France between 1976 and 1982.
