= Pierre-Raymond Villemiane =

French cyclist

Personal information
- Full name: Pierre-Raymond Villemiane
- Born: 12 March 1951 (age 75) Pineuil, France

Cycling career
- Sport: Cycling
- Current team: Retired
- Discipline: Road
- Role: Rider

Major wins
- 3 stages Tour de France; French National Road Race Champion (1980)

Pierre-Raymond Villemiane (Pineuil, 12 March 1951) is a French former professional road bicycle racer. During his professional career, Villemiane won three stages in the Tour de France.

== Major results ==
1973
Lubersac
1975
Prueba Villafranca de Ordizia
1976
Pfäffikon - Feusiberg
1977
Oradour-sur-Glane
Tour de France:

Winner Intermediate sprints classification
Winner stage 1

1978
Bayon
Beaulac-Bernos
GP Ouest-France
Parizot
Tour du Tarn
1979
Josselin
Tour de France:

Winner stage 13

1980
GP des Herbiers
France National Road Race Champion
Paris–Camembert
Castillon-la-Bataille
1981
Camors
Chateauroux - Limoges
1982
Chanteloup
GP Monaco
Trophée des Grimpeurs
Vailly-sur-Sauldre
Tour de France:

Winner stage 10
