= Giacinto Santambrogio =

Italian cyclist

Personal information
- Full name: Giacinto Santambrogio
- Born: 25 April 1945 Seregno, Italy
- Died: 13 June 2012 (aged 67)

Cycling career
- Sport: Cycling
- Discipline: Road
- Role: Rider

Giacinto Santambrogio (25 April 1945, in Seregno – 13 June 2012) was an Italian professional road bicycle racer.

== Major results ==
1969
Coppa Bernocchi
1971
Giro d'Italia:

Winner stage 20A

1972
Tre Valli Varesine
1974
Gran Premio Città di Camaiore
Grand Prix of Aargau Canton
Larciano
1975
Tour de France:

Winner stage 20

1977
Cantu
Tour de France:

Winner stage 8
