= Bernard Quilfen =

French cyclist (1949–2022)

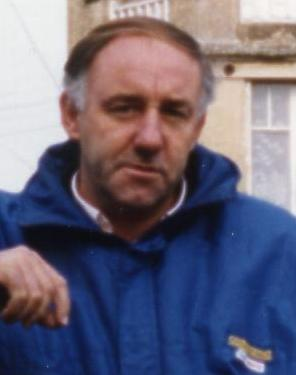

Personal information
- Full name: Bernard Quilfen
- Born: 20 April 1949 Argenteuil, France
- Died: 29 January 2022 (aged 72)

Cycling career
- Sport: Cycling
- Current team: Retired
- Discipline: Road
- Role: Rider

Major wins
- 1 stage 1977 Tour de France

Bernard Quilfen (20 April 1949 – 29 January 2022) was a French professional road bicycle racer, who won a stage in the 1977 Tour de France.

Quilfen was born in Argenteuil, Val-d'Oise. After his cycling career, Quilfen became a directeur sportif. He led the Cofidis team from the 1997 Tour de France.

Quilfen died on 29 January 2022, at the age of 72.

== Major results ==
1977
Pontoise (FRA)
Tour de France:

1st stage 14
