= Raymond Delisle =

French cyclist (1943–2013)

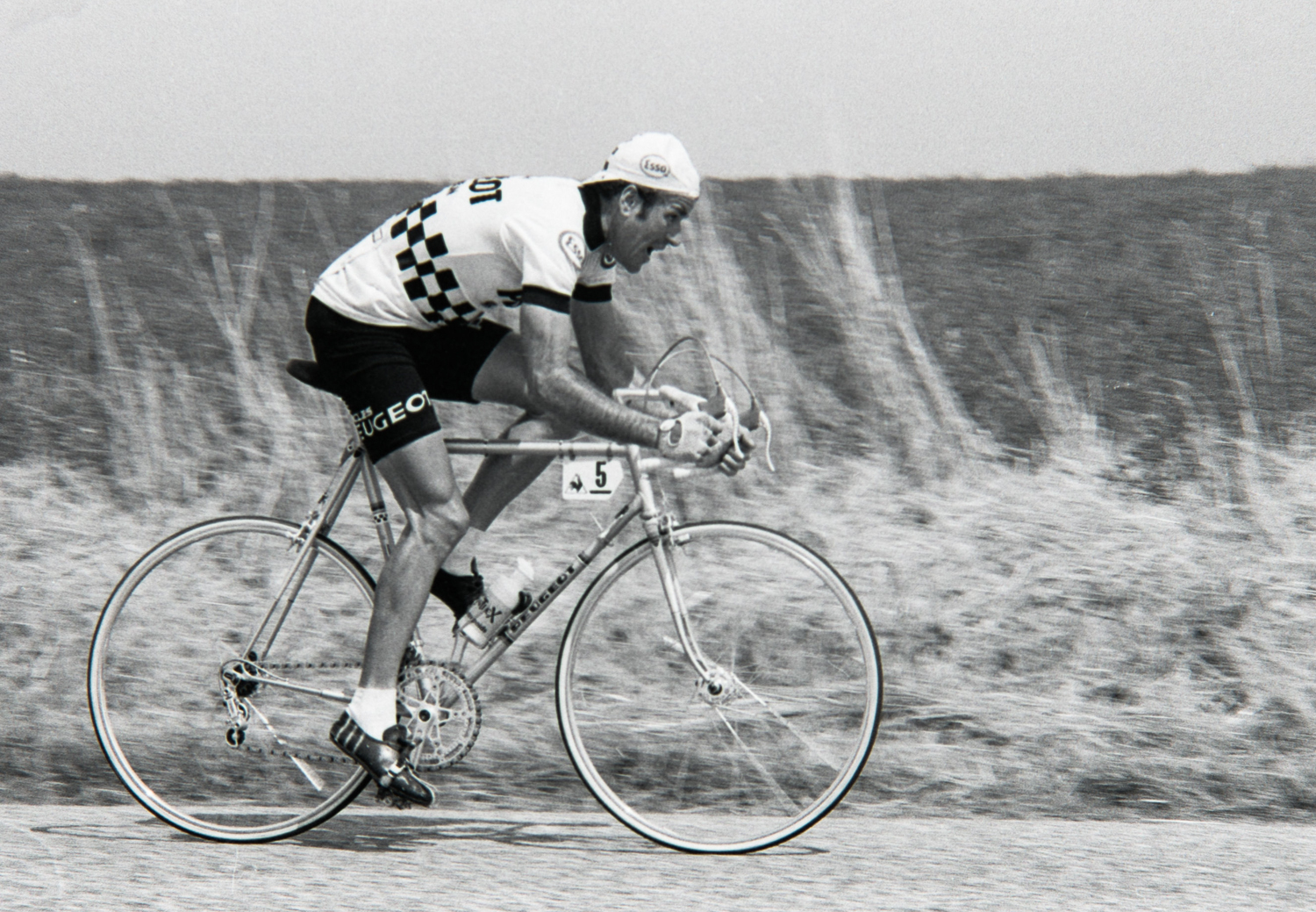
- Raymond Delisle at the 1976 Tour de France

Personal information
- Full name: Raymond Delisle
- Born: 11 March 1943 Ancteville, France
- Died: 11 August 2013 (aged 70)

Cycling career
- Sport: Cycling
- Discipline: Road
- Role: Rider
- Rider type: Puncher-climber

Amateur teams
- 1959–1964: Periers-Sports
- AC Boulogne-Billancourt

Professional teams
- 1965–1976: Peugeot
- 1977: Miko-Mercier

Major wins
- 2 stages in the Tour de France; French National Road Race Champion (1969)

Raymond Delisle (11 March 1943 – 11 August 2013) was a French professional road bicycle racer. His sporting career began with ACBB Paris. He is the only rider to have won a stage of the Tour de France on 14 July, France's national day, while wearing the jersey of national champion.

Born in Ancteville, Delisle started racing as an amateur in 1961 and won the Tour du Lac Leman classic in 1963 and the national team time-trial championship in 1964, with Jean Jourden. He turned professional in 1965. He rode 12 Tours de France between 1965 and 1977. He won two stages, one in 1969 and one in 1976. He wore the Maillot Jaune as leader of the general classification for two days after his stage win in 1976. His best placings were fourth in 1976 and ninth in 1977. He was national road champion in 1969. He retired in 1977 after 45 professional wins. He owned a hotel in Hébécrevon, Manche until his death officially recorded as suicide on 11 August 2013.

== Amateur career ==
Delisle was born on a farm near Coutances, in Normandy. He had three sisters and it was on a women's bike too large for him that he began riding in the area around the farm.

He studied to become a plumber but became an assistant-surveyor, a job which would let him ride to wherever he was working. He joined the local Periers-Sports club in 1959 and won his first race the following season. There were no races for young riders in Normandy and Delisle raced from the start against older and more experienced riders.

In 1961 he won the national team time-trial championship at Compiègne in a team that included Jean Jourden, who won that year's world road championship. Compulsory national service enrolled him at the barracks at Joinville to which many of France's top sportsmen were sent. He joined the AC Boulogne-Billancourt in the capital's north-western suburbs, a club which had supplied riders to the Peugeot professional team.

Delisle came third in the 1963 Route de France, one of the country's biggest and hardest stage races. His ride brought selection for the national team in the Tour de l'Avenir, a race for amateurs and semi-professionals which rode ahead of the Tour de France on its mountain stages. He finished third behind André Zimmerman and Rolf Maurer.

In 1965 he joined the Peugeot team, recommended by Désiré Letort, a colleague in the AC Boulogne-Billancourt.

== 14 July victory ==
Delisle won the national championship on a wind-blown circuit at Soissons in 1969 and on 28 June went to the start of the Tour de France in Roubaix. He wore not the white and black jersey of Peugeot-BP, his sponsor, but the blue, white and red of champion.

Peugeot's leader was another Frenchman, Roger Pingeon. Pingeon had won the Tour in 1967 but he was anxious about getting through the Pyrenees in a position to match Eddy Merckx, who had started dominating world cycling. Delisle said of 13 July, the eve of his victory: "Roger wanted me to stay at his side. I was willing to do that but not just as a domestique. I got away with Agostinho and Gandarias, and if you think that I didn't lift a finger to help them, you're right. But even so, Roger felt threatened and, when we were caught, he gave me a good talking-to (un bon gifle). That evening, I ate all alone, in a corner; you get the picture?"

Delisle felt the only way to save his honour was to win a stage, and next day — France's national day – he attacked from the start. A British rider, Barry Hoban, went with him but dropped off on the col de Mente. Both Merckx and the Dutch rider, Jan Janssen, set off in chase but Delisle still had 23 seconds over Janssen when the stage finished at Luchon after 199 km. Delisle said: "Accounts had been settled and, that evening, Roger congratulated me. We became good friends and we never mentioned the incident again."

At the finish, the television commentator, Léon Zitrone, asked Delisle: "How are you, Rouget?" Delisle laughed and answered: "Yes, I am in Rouget de Lisle's will and I get royalties every time they play the Marseillaise. Delisle had won as national champion on 14 July and Zitrone had punned by referring to him not as Raymond but Rouget, Rouget de Lisle being the composer of the Marseillaise, the national anthem.

== Style ==
The writer Jean-Luc Gatellier said of Delisle that "he was a creative, a puncher-climber, a Manchot who didn't lack the legs to push big gears, sitting on the nose of his upward-pointing saddle. And, in fact, a rider impossible to categorise, neither a leader nor a team rider, but a man of July who mattered to the Tour de France."

== Assessment ==
Arsène Maulave of the Belgian magazine, Coups de Pédale, wrote:

We expected a new head of French cycling in 1970, Anquetil having retired, but he [Delisle] wasn't cut out to give orders, not having the soul of a leader. He had, of course, shown his talent. He had won soundly and intelligently, but he remained above all an exemplary team-mate for Pingeon and then for Thévenet. Raymond belongs to the history of the famous team with the chequered band [a reference to the Peugeot team's jersey], to which he often brought honour. Foreign teams solicited him, notably Italian ones, but he stayed loyal to Peugeot because he liked the atmosphere there.

== Retirement ==
Delisle won the Polymultipliée and a criterium at Lescouet-Jugon in his last season, 1977. He also came ninth in the Tour de France and fifth in the season-long Prestige Pernod, forerunner of the World Cup. He had ridden 47,654 km and 250 stages in the Tour. He retired at the end of that season and began selling bicycles under his own name.

He and his wife, Mireille, then bought a 16th-century manor house at Hébecrevon, which they ran as a hotel.

== Major results ==
1964
France national amateur team-trial championship (with Jean Jourden)
1965
Hénanbihen
1966
Brionne
Hyères
Lescouet-Jugon
1967
Munneville
1968
Poullalouen
Sizun
Saint-Brice-en-Coglès
Biot
1969
Antibes
Tour de l'Hérault
Saint-Brieuc
Polymultipliée
France national road championship
Tour de France:

Winner stage 16

Le Mesnilbus
Patay
1970
Circuit des genêts verts
Commentry
Maël-Pestivien
Trophée d'Europe de la Montagne
1971
Camors
1972
Camors
1973
Jurançon
Nice
1974
Vuelta a España

Winner stage 10A

1975
Draguignan – Seillans
Henon
Genoa–Nice
Tour du Haut Var
1976
Putanges
Saint-Pol-sur-Ternoise
Plessala
Tour de France:

Winner stage 12
Wearing yellow jersey for two days
4th overall
Winner combativity award

1977
Trophée des Grimpeurs
Tour de France:

9th overall
