= Fiat (cycling team) =

Team information
- Registered: France
- Founded: 1978
- Disbanded: 1979
- Discipline: Road

Key personnel
- General manager: Raphaël Géminiani (1978–1979); Gérard Morin (1978–1979)

Team name history
- 1978–1979: Fiat

Fiat was a French professional cycling team that existed in 1978 and 1979. It was sponsored by Fiat Automobiles.
