= Alain Meslet =

French cyclist

Personal information
- Full name: Alain Meslet
- Born: 8 February 1950 (age 76) Averton, France

Cycling career
- Sport: Cycling
- Discipline: Road
- Role: Rider

Major wins
- Grand Prix du Midi Libre (1976); 1 stage 1977 Tour de France

Alain Meslet (born 8 February 1950 in Averton, Mayenne) was a French professional road bicycle racer. His sporting career began with La Hutte-Gitane.

== Major results ==
1975
Boucles de la Mayenne
1976
Grand Prix du Midi Libre

Winner stage 1
1st place overall

1977
Tour de France:

Winner stage 22B
10th place overall classification

1979
stage 2b Tour Cycliste du Tarn
1980
stage 2 Circuit Cycliste Sarthe - Pays de la Loire
