= Michel Le Denmat =

French cyclist

Personal information
- Born: 11 September 1950 (age 76) Plérin, France

Cycling career
- Sport: Cycling
- Role: Rider

Michel Le Denmat (born 11 September 1950) is a French former professional racing cyclist. He rode in three editions of the Tour de France.
