= Charles Rouxel =

French cyclist

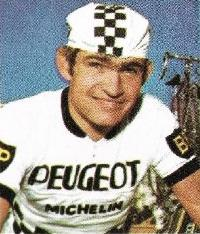
- Charles Rouxel in 1972

Personal information
- Born: 6 April 1948 (age 78) Bricquebec, France

Cycling career
- Sport: Cycling
- Role: Rider

Charles Rouxel (born 6 April 1948) is a French former professional racing cyclist. He rode in six editions of the Tour de France.
