= List of teams and cyclists in the 1981 Tour de France =

List of cyclists

For the 1981 Tour de France, in late 1980, there were plans to make the tour "open", which meant that amateur teams would also be allowed to join. This would make it possible for teams from Eastern Europe to join. The plan did not materialize, so only professional teams were invited. In January 1981, the organisation decided that there would be 15 teams with 10 cyclists, or 16 teams with 9 cyclists each. At that point, 16 teams had already submitted a request to join, and the organisation was in discussion with four additional Italian teams, and the American national team.

In the end, the American team did not apply, and the Italian teams decided to focus on the 1981 Giro d'Italia. The organisation selected 15 teams, who each selected 10 cyclists, for a total of 150 participants. The teams were:

- TI–Raleigh–Creda
- Peugeot–Esso–Michelin
- Miko–Mercier–Vivagel
- Wickes–Splendor–Europ Decor
- Sem–France Loire–Campagnolo
- La Redoute–Motobécane
- Capri Sonne–Koga Miyata
- Puch–Wolber–Campagnolo
- Boston–Mavic
- Teka
- DAF Trucks–Côte d'Or–Gazelle
- Kelme
- Sunair–Sport 80–Colnago
- Renault–Elf–Gitane
- Vermeer–Thijs–Gios

Bernard Hinault, the winner of the 1978 and 1979 Tour de France and reigning world champion, was the main favourite. His knee problems, that caused him to leave the 1980 Tour de France, were solved, and he was in form: Hinault had won important races in the spring, and he had skipped the 1981 Giro d'Italia to focus on the Tour. His main rivals were 1980 Tour de France winner Joop Zoetemelk, 1976 Tour de France winner Lucien Van Impe and Joaquim Agostinho, although they had never been able to beat Hinault when he was in form.

Freddy Maertens, the winner of the points classification in the Tour de France in 1976 and 1978, had won only three minor races in 1979 and 1980, but in 1981 he was selected again for the Tour.

== Start list ==
=== By team ===
TI–Raleigh–Creda
No.	Rider	Pos.
1	Joop Zoetemelk (NED)	4
2	Urs Freuler (SUI)	DNF
3	Frank Hoste (BEL)	95
4	Gerrie Knetemann (NED)	55
5	Henk Lubberding (NED)	54
6	Ludo Peeters (BEL)	59
7	Cees Priem (NED)	DNF
8	Aad van den Hoek (NED)	115
9	Johan van der Velde (NED)	12
10	Ad Wijnands (NED)	DNF

Peugeot–Esso–Michelin
No.	Rider	Pos.
11	Jean-René Bernaudeau (FRA)	6
12	Phil Anderson (AUS)	10
13	Jacques Bossis (FRA)	63
14	Bernard Bourreau (FRA)	72
15	Gilbert Duclos-Lassalle (FRA)	28
16	Graham Jones (GBR)	20
17	Michel Laurent (FRA)	18
18	Roger Legeay (FRA)	61
19	Hubert Linard (FRA)	46
20	Patrick Perret (FRA)	44

Miko–Mercier–Vivagel
No.	Rider	Pos.
21	Raymond Martin (FRA)	17
22	Kim Andersen (DEN)	DNF
23	Régis Clère (FRA)	51
24	Patrick Friou (FRA)	47
25	Joël Gallopin (FRA)	86
26	Jean-Louis Gauthier (FRA)	58
27	Didier Lebaud (FRA)	DNF
28	Christian Levavasseur (FRA)	77
29	Hubert Mathis (FRA)	73
30	Christian Seznec (FRA)	36

Wickes–Splendor–Europ Decor
No.	Rider	Pos.
31	Johan De Muynck (BEL)	7
32	Johnny Broers (NED)	113
33	Rudy Colman (BEL)	65
34	Claude Criquielion (BEL)	9
35	Sean Kelly (IRL)	48
36	Sven-Åke Nilsson (SWE)	8
37	Eddy Planckaert (BEL)	DNF
38	Walter Planckaert (BEL)	DNF
39	Eugène Urbany (LUX)	96
40	Guido Van Calster (BEL)	DNF

Sem–France Loire–Campagnolo
No.	Rider	Pos.
41	Joaquim Agostinho (POR)	DNF
42	Serge Beucherie (FRA)	33
43	Patrick Clerc (FRA)	DNF
44	Jean-Paul Hosotte (FRA)	98
45	Patrick Hosotte (FRA)	90
46	Fernando Mendes (POR)	DNF
47	Jacques Michaud (FRA)	23
48	Patrick Moerlen (SUI)	78
49	Albert Zweifel (SUI)	109
50	Marcel Tinazzi (FRA)	13

La Redoute–Motobécane
No.	Rider	Pos.
51	Robert Alban (FRA)	3
52	Pierre Bazzo (FRA)	31
53	Luc Durant (FRA)	92
54	Mariano Martínez (FRA)	15
55	Jean-François Pescheux (FRA)	88
56	Paul Sherwen (GBR)	DNF
57	Bernard Vallet (FRA)	45
58	Jean-Luc Vandenbroucke (BEL)	82
59	Ferdi Van Den Haute (BEL)	99
60	Didier Vanoverschelde (FRA)	26

Capri Sonne–Koga Miyata
No.	Rider	Pos.
61	Daniel Willems (BEL)	DNF
62	Ronny Claes (BEL)	40
63	Ludo Delcroix (BEL)	74
64	Theo de Rooij (NED)	39
65	Jos Jacobs (BEL)	84
66	Rudy Pevenage (BEL)	75
67	Eric Van De Wiele (BEL)	DNF
68	Dirk Wayenberg (BEL)	107
69	Jostein Wilmann (NOR)	34
70	Peter Winnen (NED)	5

Puch–Wolber–Campagnolo
No.	Rider	Pos.
71	Bernard Thévenet (FRA)	37
72	Dominique Arnaud (FRA)	24
73	Jean Chassang (FRA)	70
74	Alain De Carvalho (FRA)	53
75	Yves Hézard (FRA)	71
76	Jacques Osmont (FRA)	DNF
77	Régis Ovion (FRA)	29
78	Gerald Schönbacher (AUT)	112
79	Klaus-Peter Thaler (FRG)	49
80	Claude Vincendeau (FRA)	DNF

Boston–Mavic
No.	Rider	Pos.
81	Lucien Van Impe (BEL)	2
82	Roger De Cnijf (BEL)	87
83	Luc De Grauwe (BEL)	114
84	Marc Goossens (BEL)	DNF
85	Jan Jonkers (NED)	116
86	Alain Meslet (FRA)	41
87	Jan Nevens (BEL)	DNF
88	Philippe Tesnière (FRA)	120
89	Willy Teirlinck (BEL)	111
90	Benjamin Vermeulen (BEL)	DNF

Teka
No.	Rider	Pos.
91	Marino Lejarreta (ESP)	35
92	Bernardo Alfonsel (ESP)	69
93	Faustino Cueli (ESP)	121
94	Noël Dejonckheere (BEL)	DNF
95	Alberto Fernández (ESP)	21
96	Eulalio García Pereda (ESP)	101
97	Ismael Lejarreta (ESP)	64
98	Paulino Martínez (ESP)	91
99	José Luis Mayoz (ESP)	DNF
100	Jorge Ruiz Cabestany (ESP)	118

DAF Trucks–Côte d'Or–Gazelle
No.	Rider	Pos.
101	Hennie Kuiper (NED)	30
102	Luc Colijn (BEL)	DNF
103	Marc Dierickx (BEL)	106
104	Hendrik Devos (BEL)	57
105	Marcel Laurens (BEL)	110
106	René Martens (BEL)	83
107	Guy Nulens (BEL)	52
108	Eddy Schepers (BEL)	16
109	Hennie Stamsnijder (NED)	80
110	William Tackaert (BEL)	93

Kelme
No.	Rider	Pos.
111	Juan Fernández Martín (ESP)	50
112	Francisco Albelda (ESP)	103
113	Vicente Belda (ESP)	38
114	Jorge Fortiá (ESP)	42
115	Jesús Guzmán (ESP)	97
116	Rafael Ladrón de Guevara (ESP)	DNF
117	Imanol Murga (ESP)	104
118	Avelino Perea (ESP)	DNF
119	Jesús Suárez Cueva (ESP)	105
120	Jaime Vilamajó (ESP)	100

Sunair–Sport 80–Colnago
No.	Rider	Pos.
121	Gery Verlinden (BEL)	25
122	Alain De Roo (BEL)	119
123	Ronald De Witte (BEL)	62
124	Freddy Maertens (BEL)	66
125	Frits Pirard (NED)	94
126	Eric Vandeperre (BEL)	DNF
127	Jan van Houwelingen (NED)	DNF
128	Paul Wellens (BEL)	14
129	Leo Wellens (BEL)	102
130	Johan Wellens (BEL)	117

Renault–Elf–Gitane
No.	Rider	Pos.
131	Bernard Hinault (FRA)	1
132	Hubert Arbès (FRA)	60
133	Bernard Becaas (FRA)	68
134	Charly Bérard (FRA)	27
135	Yvon Bertin (FRA)	85
136	Jonathan Boyer (USA)	32
137	Lucien Didier (LUX)	22
138	Maurice Le Guilloux (FRA)	56
139	Jean-François Rodriguez (FRA)	19
140	Alain Vigneron (FRA)	43

Vermeer–Thijs–Gios
No.	Rider	Pos.
141	Fons De Wolf (BEL)	11
142	Herman Beysens (BEL)	79
143	Jan Bogaert (BEL)	DNF
144	Franky De Gendt (BEL)	89
145	Jos Deschoenmaecker (BEL)	67
146	Roland Liboton (BEL)	DNF
147	Louis Luyten (BEL)	76
148	Michel Pollentier (BEL)	DNF
149	Adri van Houwelingen (NED)	81
150	Eddy Verstraeten (BEL)	108

=== By rider ===
Legend
No.	Starting number worn by the rider during the Tour
Pos.	Position in the general classification
DNF	Denotes a rider who did not finish

No.	Name	Nationality	Team	Pos.	Time	Ref
1	Joop Zoetemelk	Netherlands	TI–Raleigh–Creda	4	+ 18' 21"	
2	Urs Freuler	Switzerland	TI–Raleigh–Creda	DNF	—	
3	Frank Hoste	Belgium	TI–Raleigh–Creda	95	+ 2h 23' 56"	
4	Gerrie Knetemann	Netherlands	TI–Raleigh–Creda	55	+ 1h 39' 54"	
5	Henk Lubberding	Netherlands	TI–Raleigh–Creda	54	+ 1h 37' 43"	
6	Ludo Peeters	Belgium	TI–Raleigh–Creda	59	+ 1h 43' 05"	
7	Cees Priem	Netherlands	TI–Raleigh–Creda	DNF	—	
8	Aad van den Hoek	Netherlands	TI–Raleigh–Creda	115	+ 3h 11' 29"	
9	Johan van der Velde	Netherlands	TI–Raleigh–Creda	12	+ 29' 46"	
10	Ad Wijnands	Netherlands	TI–Raleigh–Creda	DNF	—	
11	Jean-René Bernaudeau	France	Peugeot–Esso–Michelin	6	+ 23' 02"	
12	Phil Anderson	Australia	Peugeot–Esso–Michelin	10	+ 27' 00"	
13	Jacques Bossis	France	Peugeot–Esso–Michelin	63	+ 1h 44' 39"	
14	Bernard Bourreau	France	Peugeot–Esso–Michelin	72	+ 1h 56' 32"	
15	Gilbert Duclos-Lassalle	France	Peugeot–Esso–Michelin	28	+ 56' 37"	
16	Graham Jones	Great Britain	Peugeot–Esso–Michelin	20	+ 41' 06"	
17	Michel Laurent	France	Peugeot–Esso–Michelin	18	+ 34' 41"	
18	Roger Legeay	France	Peugeot–Esso–Michelin	61	+ 1h 43' 56"	
19	Hubert Linard	France	Peugeot–Esso–Michelin	46	+ 1h 26' 12"	
20	Patrick Perret	France	Peugeot–Esso–Michelin	44	+ 1h 25' 55"	
21	Raymond Martin	France	Miko–Mercier–Vivagel	17	+ 33' 41"	
22	Kim Andersen	Denmark	Miko–Mercier–Vivagel	DNF	—	
23	Régis Clère	France	Miko–Mercier–Vivagel	51	+ 1h 31' 01"	
24	Patrick Friou	France	Miko–Mercier–Vivagel	47	+ 1h 27' 20"	
25	Joël Gallopin	France	Miko–Mercier–Vivagel	86	+ 2h 10' 22"	
26	Jean-Louis Gauthier	France	Miko–Mercier–Vivagel	58	+ 1h 42' 12"	
27	Didier Lebaud	France	Miko–Mercier–Vivagel	DNF	—	
28	Christian Levavasseur	France	Miko–Mercier–Vivagel	77	+ 2h 02' 36"	
29	Hubert Mathis	France	Miko–Mercier–Vivagel	73	+ 1h 58' 29"	
30	Christian Seznec	France	Miko–Mercier–Vivagel	36	+ 1h 12' 43"	
31	Johan De Muynck	Belgium	Wickes–Splendor–Europ Decor	7	+ 24' 25"	
32	Johnny Broers	Netherlands	Wickes–Splendor–Europ Decor	113	+ 3h 01' 58"	
33	Rudy Colman	Belgium	Wickes–Splendor–Europ Decor	65	+ 1h 46' 53"	
34	Claude Criquielion	Belgium	Wickes–Splendor–Europ Decor	9	+ 26' 18"	
35	Sean Kelly	Ireland	Wickes–Splendor–Europ Decor	48	+ 1h 28' 24"	
36	Sven-Åke Nilsson	Sweden	Wickes–Splendor–Europ Decor	8	+ 24' 37"	
37	Eddy Planckaert	Belgium	Wickes–Splendor–Europ Decor	DNF	—	
38	Walter Planckaert	Belgium	Wickes–Splendor–Europ Decor	DNF	—	
39	Eugène Urbany	Luxembourg	Wickes–Splendor–Europ Decor	96	+ 2h 25' 01"	
40	Guido Van Calster	Belgium	Wickes–Splendor–Europ Decor	DNF	—	
41	Joaquim Agostinho	Portugal	Sem–France Loire–Campagnolo	DNF	—	
42	Serge Beucherie	France	Sem–France Loire–Campagnolo	33	+ 1h 01' 40"	
43	Patrick Clerc	France	Sem–France Loire–Campagnolo	DNF	—	
44	Jean-Paul Hosotte	France	Sem–France Loire–Campagnolo	98	+ 2h 28' 09"	
45	Patrick Hosotte	France	Sem–France Loire–Campagnolo	90	+ 2h 12' 49"	
46	Fernando Mendes	Portugal	Sem–France Loire–Campagnolo	DNF	—	
47	Jacques Michaud	France	Sem–France Loire–Campagnolo	23	+ 50' 23"	
48	Patrick Moerlen	Switzerland	Sem–France Loire–Campagnolo	78	+ 2h 03' 20"	
49	Albert Zweifel	Switzerland	Sem–France Loire–Campagnolo	109	+ 2h 44' 24"	
50	Marcel Tinazzi	France	Sem–France Loire–Campagnolo	13	+ 30' 03"	
51	Robert Alban	France	La Redoute–Motobécane	3	+ 17' 04"	
52	Pierre Bazzo	France	La Redoute–Motobécane	31	+ 58' 00"	
53	Luc Durant	France	La Redoute–Motobécane	92	+ 2h 13' 51"	
54	Mariano Martínez	France	La Redoute–Motobécane	15	+ 32' 16"	
55	Jean-François Pescheux	France	La Redoute–Motobécane	88	+ 2h 12' 04"	
56	Paul Sherwen	Great Britain	La Redoute–Motobécane	DNF	—	
57	Bernard Vallet	France	La Redoute–Motobécane	45	+ 1h 26' 10"	
58	Jean-Luc Vandenbroucke	Belgium	La Redoute–Motobécane	82	+ 2h 07' 14"	
59	Ferdi Van Den Haute	Belgium	La Redoute–Motobécane	99	+ 2h 28' 11"	
60	Didier Vanoverschelde	France	La Redoute–Motobécane	26	+ 53' 13"	
61	Daniel Willems	Belgium	Capri Sonne–Koga Miyata	DNF	—	
62	Ronny Claes	Belgium	Capri Sonne–Koga Miyata	40	+ 1h 17' 08"	
63	Ludo Delcroix	Belgium	Capri Sonne–Koga Miyata	74	+ 1h 59' 59"	
64	Theo de Rooij	Netherlands	Capri Sonne–Koga Miyata	39	+ 1h 16' 02"	
65	Jos Jacobs	Belgium	Capri Sonne–Koga Miyata	84	+ 2h 08' 21"	
66	Rudy Pevenage	Belgium	Capri Sonne–Koga Miyata	75	+ 2h 00' 34"	
67	Eric Van De Wiele	Belgium	Capri Sonne–Koga Miyata	DNF	—	
68	Dirk Wayenberg	Belgium	Capri Sonne–Koga Miyata	107	+ 2h 40' 27"	
69	Jostein Wilmann	Norway	Capri Sonne–Koga Miyata	34	+ 1h 02' 46"	
70	Peter Winnen	Netherlands	Capri Sonne–Koga Miyata	5	+ 20' 26"	
71	Bernard Thévenet	France	Puch–Wolber–Campagnolo	37	+ 1h 12' 48"	
72	Dominique Arnaud	France	Puch–Wolber–Campagnolo	24	+ 52' 15"	
73	Jean Chassang	France	Puch–Wolber–Campagnolo	70	+ 1h 50' 34"	
74	Alain De Carvalho	France	Puch–Wolber–Campagnolo	53	+ 1h 35' 25"	
75	Yves Hézard	France	Puch–Wolber–Campagnolo	71	+ 1h 52' 15"	
76	Jacques Osmont	France	Puch–Wolber–Campagnolo	DNF	—	
77	Régis Ovion	France	Puch–Wolber–Campagnolo	29	+ 56' 43"	
78	Gerhard Schönbacher	Austria	Puch–Wolber–Campagnolo	112	+ 2h 51' 30"	
79	Klaus-Peter Thaler	West Germany	Puch–Wolber–Campagnolo	49	+ 1h 28' 51"	
80	Claude Vincendeau	France	Puch–Wolber–Campagnolo	DNF	—	
81	Lucien Van Impe	Belgium	Boston–Mavic	2	+ 14' 34"	
82	Roger De Cnijf	Belgium	Boston–Mavic	87	+ 2h 10' 47"	
83	Luc De Grauwe	Belgium	Boston–Mavic	114	+ 3h 05' 51"	
84	Marc Goossens	Belgium	Boston–Mavic	DNF	—	
85	Jan Jonkers	Netherlands	Boston–Mavic	116	+ 3h 15' 21"	
86	Alain Meslet	France	Boston–Mavic	41	+ 1h 18' 38"	
87	Jan Nevens	Belgium	Boston–Mavic	DNF	—	
88	Philippe Tesnière	France	Boston–Mavic	120	+ 4h 14' 59"	
89	Willy Teirlinck	Belgium	Boston–Mavic	111	+ 2h 46' 44"	
90	Benjamin Vermeulen	Belgium	Boston–Mavic	DNF	—	
91	Marino Lejarreta	Spain	Teka	35	+ 1h 10' 37"	
92	Bernardo Alfonsel	Spain	Teka	69	+ 1h 49' 11"	
93	Faustino Cueli	Spain	Teka	121	+ 4h 29' 54"	
94	Noël Dejonckheere	Belgium	Teka	DNF	—	
95	Alberto Fernández	Spain	Teka	21	+ 42' 27"	
96	Eulalio García Pereda	Spain	Teka	101	+ 2h 30' 43"	
97	Ismael Lejarreta	Spain	Teka	64	+ 1h 44' 49"	
98	Paulino Martínez	Spain	Teka	91	+ 2h 13' 12"	
99	José Luis Mayoz	Spain	Teka	DNF	—	
100	Jorge Ruiz Cabestany	Spain	Teka	118	+ 3h 16' 13"	
101	Hennie Kuiper	Netherlands	DAF Trucks–Côte d'Or–Gazelle	30	+ 57' 21"	
102	Luc Colijn	Belgium	DAF Trucks–Côte d'Or–Gazelle	DNF	—	
103	Marc Dierickx	Belgium	DAF Trucks–Côte d'Or–Gazelle	106	+ 2h 38' 10"	
104	Hendrik Devos	Belgium	DAF Trucks–Côte d'Or–Gazelle	57	+ 1h 42' 05"	
105	Marcel Laurens	Belgium	DAF Trucks–Côte d'Or–Gazelle	110	+ 2h 45' 21"	
106	René Martens	Belgium	DAF Trucks–Côte d'Or–Gazelle	83	+ 2h 07' 41"	
107	Guy Nulens	Belgium	DAF Trucks–Côte d'Or–Gazelle	52	+ 1h 33' 39"	
108	Eddy Schepers	Belgium	DAF Trucks–Côte d'Or–Gazelle	16	+ 33' 27"	
109	Hennie Stamsnijder	Netherlands	DAF Trucks–Côte d'Or–Gazelle	80	+ 2h 05' 31"	
110	William Tackaert	Belgium	DAF Trucks–Côte d'Or–Gazelle	93	+ 2h 21' 50"	
111	Juan Fernández Martín	Spain	Kelme	50	+ 1h 30' 46"	
112	Francisco Albelda	Spain	Kelme	103	+ 2h 33' 54"	
113	Vicente Belda	Spain	Kelme	38	+ 1h 14' 23"	
114	Jorge Fortiá	Spain	Kelme	42	+ 1h 23' 28"	
115	Jesús Guzmán	Spain	Kelme	97	+ 2h 25' 38"	
116	Rafael Ladrón de Guevara	Spain	Kelme	DNF	—	
117	Imanol Murga	Spain	Kelme	104	+ 2h 35' 45"	
118	Avelino Perea	Spain	Kelme	DNF	—	
119	Jesús Suárez Cueva	Spain	Kelme	105	+ 2h 37' 36"	
120	Jaime Vilamajó	Spain	Kelme	100	+ 2h 29' 41"	
121	Gery Verlinden	Belgium	Sunair–Sport 80–Colnago	25	+ 52' 48"	
122	Alain De Roo	Belgium	Sunair–Sport 80–Colnago	119	+ 3h 19' 07"	
123	Ronald De Witte	Belgium	Sunair–Sport 80–Colnago	62	+ 1h 44' 07"	
124	Freddy Maertens	Belgium	Sunair–Sport 80–Colnago	66	+ 1h 47' 34"	
125	Frits Pirard	Netherlands	Sunair–Sport 80–Colnago	94	+ 2h 23' 40"	
126	Eric Vandeperre	Belgium	Sunair–Sport 80–Colnago	DNF	—	
127	Jan van Houwelingen	Netherlands	Sunair–Sport 80–Colnago	DNF	—	
128	Paul Wellens	Belgium	Sunair–Sport 80–Colnago	14	+ 32' 09"	
129	Leo Wellens	Belgium	Sunair–Sport 80–Colnago	102	+ 2h 30' 46"	
130	Johan Wellens	Belgium	Sunair–Sport 80–Colnago	117	+ 3h 16' 02"	
131	Bernard Hinault	France	Renault–Elf–Gitane	1	96h 19' 38"	
132	Hubert Arbès	France	Renault–Elf–Gitane	60	+ 1h 43' 45"	
133	Bernard Becaas	France	Renault–Elf–Gitane	68	+ 1h 48' 05"	
134	Charly Bérard	France	Renault–Elf–Gitane	27	+ 56' 06"	
135	Yvon Bertin	France	Renault–Elf–Gitane	85	+ 2h 10' 08"	
136	Jonathan Boyer	United States	Renault–Elf–Gitane	32	+ 59' 21"	
137	Lucien Didier	Luxembourg	Renault–Elf–Gitane	22	+ 49' 26"	
138	Maurice Le Guilloux	France	Renault–Elf–Gitane	56	+ 1h 41' 25"	
139	Jean-François Rodriguez	France	Renault–Elf–Gitane	19	+ 38' 32"	
140	Alain Vigneron	France	Renault–Elf–Gitane	43	+ 1h 24' 52"	
141	Fons De Wolf	Belgium	Vermeer–Thijs–Gios	11	+ 28' 53"	
142	Herman Beysens	Belgium	Vermeer–Thijs–Gios	79	+ 2h 03' 25"	
143	Jan Bogaert	Belgium	Vermeer–Thijs–Gios	DNF	—	
144	Franky De Gendt	Belgium	Vermeer–Thijs–Gios	89	+ 2h 12' 42"	
145	Jos Deschoenmaecker	Belgium	Vermeer–Thijs–Gios	67	+ 1h 47' 54"	
146	Roland Liboton	Belgium	Vermeer–Thijs–Gios	DNF	—	
147	Louis Luyten	Belgium	Vermeer–Thijs–Gios	76	+ 2h 02' 01"	
148	Michel Pollentier	Belgium	Vermeer–Thijs–Gios	DNF	—	
149	Adri van Houwelingen	Netherlands	Vermeer–Thijs–Gios	81	+ 2h 06' 20"	
150	Eddy Verstraeten	Belgium	Vermeer–Thijs–Gios	108	+ 2h 44' 22"	
