= List of teams and cyclists in the 1979 Vuelta a España =

For the 1979 Vuelta a España, the field consisted of 90 riders; 73 finished the race.

== By rider ==
Legend
| No. | Starting number worn by the rider during the Vuelta |
| Pos. | Position in the general classification |
| Time | Deficit to the winner of the general classification |
| DNF | Denotes a rider who did not finish |

| No. | Name | Nationality | Team | Pos. | Time | Ref |
|---|---|---|---|---|---|---|
| 1 | Lucien Van Impe | Belgium | Kas | 6 | + 6' 49" | |
| 2 | Francisco Galdós | Spain | Kas | 2 | + 2' 43" | |
| 3 | Enrique Martínez Heredia | Spain | Kas | 35 | + 38' 42" | |
| 4 | Etienne Van der Helst | Belgium | Kas | 69 | + 2h 05' 55" | |
| 5 | Rafael Ladrón | Spain | Kas | 34 | + 37' 37" | |
| 6 | Jesús Suárez Cueva | Spain | Kas | 24 | + 28' 19" | |
| 7 | Bernardo Alfonsel | Spain | Kas | 23 | + 25' 52" | |
| 8 | Marc Renier | Belgium | Kas | DNF | — | |
| 9 | René Dillen | Belgium | Kas | 37 | + 46' 00" | |
| 10 | José Nazabal | Spain | Kas | 46 | + 54' 26" | |
| 11 | Salvador Jarque Borràs | Spain | Transmallorca-Flavia | DNF | — | |
| 12 | Vicente Belda | Spain | Transmallorca-Flavia | 17 | + 16' 19" | |
| 13 | José Enrique Cima | Spain | Transmallorca-Flavia | DNF | — | |
| 14 | Pedro Torres | Spain | Transmallorca-Flavia | 7 | + 7' 41" | |
| 15 | Juan Pujol Pagés | Spain | Transmallorca-Flavia | 20 | + 22' 29" | |
| 16 | Sebastián Pozo | Spain | Transmallorca-Flavia | 59 | + 1h 31' 28" | |
| 17 | José Manuel García Rodríguez | Spain | Transmallorca-Flavia | 56 | + 1h 23' 35" | |
| 18 | Antonio González Rodríguez | Spain | Transmallorca-Flavia | 36 | + 39' 11" | |
| 19 | Ramón Vila Tamarit | Spain | Transmallorca-Flavia | DNF | — | |
| 20 | Francisco Albelda | Spain | Transmallorca-Flavia | 57 | + 1h 28' 06" | |
| 21 | Michel Pollentier | Belgium | Splendor | 3 | + 3' 21" | |
| 22 | Erich Jagsch | Austria | Splendor | 65 | + 1h 48' 06" | |
| 23 | Roger Verschaeve | Belgium | Splendor | 66 | + 1h 52' 38" | |
| 24 | Wim Myngheer | Belgium | Splendor | 44 | + 52' 43" | |
| 25 | Ronny Vanmarcke | Belgium | Splendor | DNF | — | |
| 26 | Lieven Malfait | Belgium | Splendor | DNF | — | |
| 27 | Ludo Loos | Belgium | Splendor | 38 | + 46' 30" | |
| 28 | Herman Beysens | Belgium | Splendor | 16 | + 12' 51" | |
| 29 | Alain Desaever | Belgium | Splendor | 67 | + 1h 54' 42" | |
| 30 | Sean Kelly | Ireland | Splendor | DNF | — | |
| 31 | Manuel Esparza | Spain | Teka | 4 | + 3' 22" | |
| 32 | José Antonio González | Spain | Teka | 33 | + 37' 35" | |
| 33 | José Pesarrodona | Spain | Teka | 18 | + 19' 11" | |
| 34 | José Viejo | Spain | Teka | DNF | — | |
| 35 | Eulalio García | Spain | Teka | 32 | + 37' 19" | |
| 36 | Noël Dejonckheere | Belgium | Teka | 63 | + 1h 35' 08" | |
| 37 | Vicente López Carril | Spain | Teka | 13 | + 11' 22" | |
| 38 | Domingo Perurena | Spain | Teka | DNF | — | |
| 39 | Miguel Gutiérrez Mayor | Spain | Teka | 62 | + 1h 34' 56" | |
| 40 | Daniele Tinchella | Italy | Teka | 70 | + 2h 06' 11" | |
| 41 | Ángel Arroyo | Spain | Moliner–Vereco | 19 | + 20' 20" | |
| 42 | Miguel María Lasa | Spain | Moliner–Vereco | 12 | + 11' 22" | |
| 43 | Paulino Martínez | Spain | Moliner–Vereco | DNF | — | |
| 44 | Julián Andiano | Spain | Moliner–Vereco | 11 | + 10' 55" | |
| 45 | Faustino Rupérez | Spain | Moliner–Vereco | 5 | + 5' 51" | |
| 46 | José Luis López Cerrón | Spain | Moliner–Vereco | 68 | + 1h 56' 36" | |
| 47 | Alberto Fernández | Spain | Moliner–Vereco | 15 | + 12' 05" | |
| 48 | Carlos Melero | Spain | Moliner–Vereco | 22 | + 24' 19" | |
| 49 | Antonio Menéndez | Spain | Moliner–Vereco | 40 | + 48' 23" | |
| 50 | Manuel Martin Conde | Spain | Moliner–Vereco | 64 | + 1h 44' 18" | |
| 51 | Alfons De Wolf | Belgium | Lano–Boule d'Or | 10 | + 10' 42" | |
| 52 | Jan van Houwelingen | Netherlands | Lano–Boule d'Or | 55 | + 1h 23' 22" | |
| 53 | Roger De Cnijf | Belgium | Lano–Boule d'Or | 39 | + 48' 14" | |
| 54 | Johnny De Nul | Belgium | Lano–Boule d'Or | 72 | + 2h 09' 13" | |
| 55 | Adri van Houwelingen | Netherlands | Lano–Boule d'Or | 48 | + 59' 42" | |
| 56 | Frans Van Vlierberghe | Belgium | Lano–Boule d'Or | 73 | + 2h 10' 36" | |
| 57 | Patrick Verstraete | Belgium | Lano–Boule d'Or | 61 | + 1h 34' 38" | |
| 58 | Eddy Vanhaerens | Belgium | Lano–Boule d'Or | DNF | — | |
| 59 | Benny Van Der Auwera | Belgium | Lano–Boule d'Or | 47 | + 54' 29" | |
| 60 | Cees Bal | Netherlands | Lano–Boule d'Or | 45 | + 54' 23" | |
| 61 | Joop Zoetemelk | Netherlands | Miko–Mercier | 1 | 94h 57' 05" | |
| 62 | Christian Seznec | France | Miko–Mercier | 9 | + 10' 01" | |
| 63 | Raymond Martin | France | Miko–Mercier | 14 | + 11' 51" | |
| 64 | Frits Pirard | Netherlands | Miko–Mercier | 54 | + 1h 12' 06" | |
| 65 | Joël Gallopin | France | Miko–Mercier | 58 | + 1h 28' 51" | |
| 66 | Jean-Louis Gauthier | France | Miko–Mercier | 52 | + 1h 06' 32" | |
| 67 | Patrick Friou | France | Miko–Mercier | 41 | + 48' 29" | |
| 68 | Christian Levavasseur | France | Miko–Mercier | DNF | — | |
| 69 | Hubert Mathis | France | Miko–Mercier | 43 | + 49' 33" | |
| 70 | André Mollet | France | Miko–Mercier | 27 | + 35' 34" | |
| 71 | Jesús Manzaneque | Spain | Colchón CR | 29 | + 36' 06" | |
| 72 | Antonio Abad Collado | Spain | Colchón CR | DNF | — | |
| 73 | Carlos Ocaña Crespo | Spain | Colchón CR | 26 | + 33' 26" | |
| 74 | Ricardo Zúñiga Carrasco | Spain | Colchón CR | 28 | + 36' 01" | |
| 75 | Ángel López del Álamo | Spain | Colchón CR | 31 | + 36' 33" | |
| 76 | Isidro Juárez del Moral | Spain | Colchón CR | 49 | + 1h 01' 17" | |
| 77 | Juan Argudo | Spain | Colchón CR | 53 | + 1h 12' 03" | |
| 78 | Jesús López Carril | Spain | Colchón CR | 60 | + 1h 31' 55" | |
| 79 | Feliciano Sobradillo | Spain | Colchón CR | DNF | — | |
| 80 | Jesus Hiniesto | Spain | Colchón CR | DNF | — | |
| 81 | Francisco Elorriaga | Spain | Novostil-Helios | 51 | + 1h 06' 10" | |
| 82 | Felipe Yáñez | Spain | Novostil-Helios | 8 | + 8' 03" | |
| 83 | Ismael Lejarreta | Spain | Novostil-Helios | 21 | + 22' 40" | |
| 84 | José Luis Mayoz Aizpurua | Spain | Novostil-Helios | 42 | + 48' 37" | |
| 85 | Gonzalo Aja | Spain | Novostil-Helios | 25 | + 32' 21" | |
| 86 | Roque Moya | Spain | Novostil-Helios | 71 | + 2h 08' 38" | |
| 87 | Fernando Cabrero Martínez | Spain | Novostil-Helios | 50 | + 1h 02' 21" | |
| 88 | Custódio Mazuela Castillo | Spain | Novostil-Helios | DNF | — | |
| 89 | Marino Lejarreta | Spain | Novostil-Helios | 30 | + 36' 24" | |
| 90 | José María Yurrebaso | Spain | Novostil-Helios | DNF | — | |
