= 1979 Vuelta a España, Prologue to Stage 10 =

Cycling race stages

The 1979 Vuelta a España was the 34th edition of the Vuelta a España, one of cycling's Grand Tours. The Vuelta began in Jerez de la Frontera, with a prologue individual time trial on 24 April, and Stage 10 occurred on 4 May with a stage to Zaragoza. The race finished in Madrid on 13 May.

== Prologue ==
24 April 1979 — Jerez de la Frontera to Jerez de la Frontera, 6.3 km (3.9 mi) (ITT)

Prologue result and general classification after Prologue

| Rank | Rider | Team | Time |
|---|---|---|---|
| 1 | Joop Zoetemelk (NED) | Miko–Mercier–Vivagel | 8' 16" |
| 2 | Alfons De Wolf (BEL) | Lano–Boule d'Or | + 14" |
| 3 | Michel Pollentier (BEL) | Splendor–Euro Soap | + 18" |
| 4 | Jan van Houwelingen (NED) | Lano–Boule d'Or | s.t. |
| 5 | Lucien Van Impe (BEL) | Kas–Campagnolo | s.t. |
| 6 | Roger De Cnijf (BEL) | Lano–Boule d'Or | + 25" |
| 7 | Johnny De Nul (BEL) | Lano–Boule d'Or | + 29" |
| 8 | Joël Gallopin (FRA) | Miko–Mercier–Vivagel | + 32" |
| 9 | Jesús Manzaneque (ESP) | Colchón CR | + 33" |
| 10 | José Antonio González (ESP) | Teka | s.t. |

== Stage 1 ==
25 April 1979 — Jerez de la Frontera to Seville, 156 km (97 mi)

Stage 1 result

| Rank | Rider | Team | Time |
|---|---|---|---|
| 1 | Sean Kelly (IRL) | Splendor–Euro Soap | 4h 37' 32" |
| 2 | Eddy Vanhaerens (BEL) | Lano–Boule d'Or | s.t. |
| 3 | Lieven Malfait (BEL) | Splendor–Euro Soap | s.t. |
| 4 | Patrick Friou (FRA) | Miko–Mercier–Vivagel | s.t. |
| 5 | Miguel María Lasa (ESP) | Moliner–Vereco | s.t. |
| 6 | Noël Dejonckheere (BEL) | Teka | s.t. |
| 7 | Eulalio García (ESP) | Teka | s.t. |
| 8 | Jean-Louis Gauthier (FRA) | Miko–Mercier–Vivagel | s.t. |
| 9 | Marc Renier (BEL) | Kas–Campagnolo | s.t. |
| 10 | Wim Myngheer (BEL) | Splendor–Euro Soap | s.t. |

General classification after Stage 1

| Rank | Rider | Team | Time |
|---|---|---|---|
| 1 | Joop Zoetemelk (NED) | Miko–Mercier–Vivagel | 4h 45' 48" |
| 2 | Alfons De Wolf (BEL) | Lano–Boule d'Or | + 14" |
| 3 | Jan van Houwelingen (NED) | Lano–Boule d'Or | + 18" |
| 4 | Michel Pollentier (BEL) | Splendor–Euro Soap | s.t. |
| 5 | Lucien Van Impe (BEL) | Kas–Campagnolo | + 19" |
| 6 | Roger De Cnijf (BEL) | Lano–Boule d'Or | + 25" |
| 7 | Johnny De Nul (BEL) | Lano–Boule d'Or | + 27" |
| 8 | Joël Gallopin (FRA) | Miko–Mercier–Vivagel | + 32" |
| 9 | Jesús Manzaneque (ESP) | Colchón CR | + 33" |
| 10 | José Antonio González (ESP) | Teka | s.t. |

== Stage 2 ==
26 April 1979 — Seville to Córdoba, 188 km (117 mi)

Stage 2 result

| Rank | Rider | Team | Time |
|---|---|---|---|
| 1 | Alfons De Wolf (BEL) | Lano–Boule d'Or | 5h 19' 54" |
| 2 | Etienne Van der Helst (BEL) | Kas–Campagnolo | s.t. |
| 3 | Noël Dejonckheere (BEL) | Teka | s.t. |
| 4 | Francisco Elorriaga (ESP) | Novostil-Helios | s.t. |
| 5 | Joël Gallopin (FRA) | Miko–Mercier–Vivagel | s.t. |
| 6 | Marc Renier (BEL) | Kas–Campagnolo | s.t. |
| 7 | Roger De Cnijf (BEL) | Lano–Boule d'Or | s.t. |
| 8 | André Mollet (FRA) | Miko–Mercier–Vivagel | s.t. |
| 9 | Joop Zoetemelk (NED) | Miko–Mercier–Vivagel | s.t. |
| 10 | Pedro Torres (ESP) | Transmallorca-Flavia | s.t. |

General classification after Stage 2

| Rank | Rider | Team | Time |
|---|---|---|---|
| 1 | Joop Zoetemelk (NED) | Miko–Mercier–Vivagel | 10h 05' 42" |
| 2 | Alfons De Wolf (BEL) | Lano–Boule d'Or | + 14" |
| 3 | Jan van Houwelingen (NED) | Lano–Boule d'Or | + 18" |
| 4 | Michel Pollentier (BEL) | Splendor–Euro Soap | s.t. |
| 5 | Lucien Van Impe (BEL) | Kas–Campagnolo | + 19" |
| 6 | Roger De Cnijf (BEL) | Lano–Boule d'Or | + 25" |
| 7 | Johnny De Nul (BEL) | Lano–Boule d'Or | + 27" |
| 8 | Joël Gallopin (FRA) | Miko–Mercier–Vivagel | + 32" |
| 9 | Jesús Manzaneque (ESP) | Colchón CR | s.t. |
| 10 | José Antonio González (ESP) | Teka | s.t. |

== Stage 3 ==
27 April 1979 — Córdoba to Sierra Nevada, 190 km (120 mi)

Stage 3 result

| Rank | Rider | Team | Time |
|---|---|---|---|
| 1 | Felipe Yáñez (ESP) | Novostil-Helios | 6h 04' 23" |
| 2 | Joop Zoetemelk (NED) | Miko–Mercier–Vivagel | + 11" |
| 3 | Manuel Esparza (ESP) | Teka | + 29" |
| 4 | Pedro Torres (ESP) | Transmallorca-Flavia | + 1' 00" |
| 5 | Faustino Rupérez (ESP) | Moliner–Vereco | + 1' 01" |
| 6 | Francisco Galdós (ESP) | Kas–Campagnolo | s.t. |
| 7 | Ismael Lejarreta (ESP) | Novostil-Helios | s.t. |
| 8 | Julián Andiano (ESP) | Moliner–Vereco | s.t. |
| 9 | Miguel María Lasa (ESP) | Moliner–Vereco | s.t. |
| 10 | Raymond Martin (FRA) | Miko–Mercier–Vivagel | s.t. |

General classification after Stage 3

| Rank | Rider | Team | Time |
|---|---|---|---|
| 1 | Joop Zoetemelk (NED) | Miko–Mercier–Vivagel | 16h 10' 16" |
| 2 | Felipe Yáñez (ESP) | Novostil-Helios | + 40" |
| 3 | Manuel Esparza (ESP) | Teka | + 1' 10" |
| 4 | Francisco Galdós (ESP) | Kas–Campagnolo | + 1' 25" |
| 5 | Miguel María Lasa (ESP) | Moliner–Vereco | + 1' 30" |
| 6 | Raymond Martin (FRA) | Miko–Mercier–Vivagel | + 1' 39" |
| 7 | Faustino Rupérez (ESP) | Moliner–Vereco | + 1' 41" |
| 8 | Pedro Torres (ESP) | Transmallorca-Flavia | + 1' 47" |
| 9 | Julián Andiano (ESP) | Moliner–Vereco | + 1' 53" |
| 10 | Lucien Van Impe (BEL) | Kas–Campagnolo | + 1' 57" |

== Stage 4 ==
28 April 1979 — Granada to Puerto Lumbreras, 222 km (138 mi)

Stage 4 result

| Rank | Rider | Team | Time |
|---|---|---|---|
| 1 | Roger De Cnijf (BEL) | Lano–Boule d'Or | 6h 04' 05" |
| 2 | Etienne Van der Helst (BEL) | Kas–Campagnolo | + 7" |
| 3 | Pedro Torres (ESP) | Transmallorca-Flavia | s.t. |
| 4 | Jean-Louis Gauthier (FRA) | Miko–Mercier–Vivagel | s.t. |
| 5 | Ludo Loos (BEL) | Splendor–Euro Soap | + 10" |
| 6 | Noël Dejonckheere (BEL) | Teka | + 15" |
| 7 | Jesús Suárez Cueva (ESP) | Kas–Campagnolo | s.t. |
| 8 | Alfons De Wolf (BEL) | Lano–Boule d'Or | s.t. |
| 9 | Patrick Verstraete (BEL) | Lano–Boule d'Or | s.t. |
| 10 | Sean Kelly (IRL) | Splendor–Euro Soap | s.t. |

General classification after Stage 4

| Rank | Rider | Team | Time |
|---|---|---|---|
| 1 | Joop Zoetemelk (NED) | Miko–Mercier–Vivagel | 22h 14' 36" |
| 2 | Felipe Yáñez (ESP) | Novostil-Helios | + 41" |
| 3 | Manuel Esparza (ESP) | Teka | + 1' 12" |
| 4 | Francisco Galdós (ESP) | Kas–Campagnolo | + 1' 27" |
| 5 | Miguel María Lasa (ESP) | Moliner–Vereco | + 1' 32" |
| 6 | Pedro Torres (ESP) | Transmallorca-Flavia | + 1' 41" |
| 7 | Raymond Martin (FRA) | Miko–Mercier–Vivagel | + 1' 43" |
| 8 | Julián Andiano (ESP) | Moliner–Vereco | + 1' 55" |
| 9 | Lucien Van Impe (BEL) | Kas–Campagnolo | + 1' 59" |
| 10 | Christian Seznec (FRA) | Miko–Mercier–Vivagel | + 2' 06" |

== Stage 5 ==
29 April 1979 — Puerto Lumbreras to Murcia, 139 km (86 mi)

Stage 5 result

| Rank | Rider | Team | Time |
|---|---|---|---|
| 1 | Juan Argudo (ESP) | Colchón CR | 3h 36' 59" |
| 2 | Sean Kelly (IRL) | Splendor–Euro Soap | + 8' 27" |
| 3 | Noël Dejonckheere (BEL) | Teka | s.t. |
| 4 | Alfons De Wolf (BEL) | Lano–Boule d'Or | s.t. |
| 5 | Jesús Suárez Cueva (ESP) | Kas–Campagnolo | s.t. |
| 6 | Miguel María Lasa (ESP) | Moliner–Vereco | s.t. |
| 7 | | Splendor–Euro Soap | s.t. |
| 8 | René Dillen (BEL) | Kas–Campagnolo | s.t. |
| 9 | Patrick Friou (FRA) | Miko–Mercier–Vivagel | s.t. |
| 10 | Herman Beysens (BEL) | Splendor–Euro Soap | s.t. |

General classification after Stage 5

| Rank | Rider | Team | Time |
|---|---|---|---|
| 1 | Joop Zoetemelk (NED) | Miko–Mercier–Vivagel | 26h 00' 02" |
| 2 | Felipe Yáñez (ESP) | Novostil-Helios | + 39" |
| 3 | Manuel Esparza (ESP) | Teka | + 1' 10" |
| 4 | Francisco Galdós (ESP) | Kas–Campagnolo | + 1' 25" |
| 5 | Miguel María Lasa (ESP) | Moliner–Vereco | + 1' 30" |
| 6 | Pedro Torres (ESP) | Transmallorca-Flavia | + 1' 39" |
| 7 | Raymond Martin (FRA) | Miko–Mercier–Vivagel | + 1' 01" |
| 8 | Julián Andiano (ESP) | Moliner–Vereco | + 1' 53" |
| 9 | Lucien Van Impe (BEL) | Kas–Campagnolo | + 1' 57" |
| 10 | Christian Seznec (FRA) | Miko–Mercier–Vivagel | + 2' 01" |

== Stage 6 ==
30 April 1979 — Murcia to Alcoy, 171 km (106 mi)

Stage 6 result

| Rank | Rider | Team | Time |
|---|---|---|---|
| 1 | Christian Levavasseur (FRA) | Miko–Mercier–Vivagel | 4h 43' 27" |
| 2 | Rafael Ladrón (ESP) | Kas–Campagnolo | s.t. |
| 3 | Ángel Arroyo (ESP) | Moliner–Vereco | + 4' 29" |
| 4 | Ramón Vila Tamarit (ESP) | Transmallorca-Flavia | + 7' 20" |
| 5 | Noël Dejonckheere (BEL) | Teka | + 7' 27" |
| 6 | Miguel María Lasa (ESP) | Moliner–Vereco | s.t. |
| 7 | Michel Pollentier (BEL) | Splendor–Euro Soap | s.t. |
| 8 | Alfons De Wolf (BEL) | Lano–Boule d'Or | s.t. |
| 9 | Pedro Torres (ESP) | Transmallorca-Flavia | s.t. |
| 10 | Lucien Van Impe (BEL) | Kas–Campagnolo | s.t. |

General classification after Stage 6

| Rank | Rider | Team | Time |
|---|---|---|---|
| 1 | Christian Levavasseur (FRA) | Miko–Mercier–Vivagel | |
| 2 | Joop Zoetemelk (NED) | Miko–Mercier–Vivagel | + 50" |
| 3 | Felipe Yáñez (ESP) | Novostil-Helios | + 1' 29" |

== Stage 7 ==
1 May 1979 — Alcoy to Sedaví, 173 km (107 mi)

Stage 7 result

| Rank | Rider | Team | Time |
|---|---|---|---|
| 1 | Alfons De Wolf (BEL) | Lano–Boule d'Or | 4h 28' 42" |
| 2 | Frits Pirard (NED) | Miko–Mercier–Vivagel | s.t. |
| 3 | Eulalio García (ESP) | Teka | s.t. |
| 4 | Enrique Martínez Heredia (ESP) | Kas–Campagnolo | s.t. |
| 5 | Ronny Vanmarcke (BEL) | Splendor–Euro Soap | s.t. |
| 6 | Alberto Fernández (ESP) | Moliner–Vereco | s.t. |
| 7 | Jan van Houwelingen (NED) | Lano–Boule d'Or | s.t. |
| 8 | Sean Kelly (IRL) | Splendor–Euro Soap | + 36" |
| 9 | Miguel María Lasa (ESP) | Moliner–Vereco | s.t. |
| 10 | Jesús Suárez Cueva (ESP) | Kas–Campagnolo | s.t. |

General classification after Stage 7

| Rank | Rider | Team | Time |
|---|---|---|---|
| 1 | Christian Levavasseur (FRA) | Miko–Mercier–Vivagel | 35h 16' 23" |
| 2 | Joop Zoetemelk (NED) | Miko–Mercier–Vivagel | + 50" |
| 3 | Felipe Yáñez (ESP) | Novostil-Helios | + 1' 29" |
| 4 | Manuel Esparza (ESP) | Teka | + 2' 00" |
| 5 | Francisco Galdós (ESP) | Kas–Campagnolo | + 2' 17" |
| 6 | Miguel María Lasa (ESP) | Moliner–Vereco | + 2' 20" |
| 7 | Alfons De Wolf (BEL) | Lano–Boule d'Or | + 2' 27" |
| 8 | Pedro Torres (ESP) | Transmallorca-Flavia | + 2' 29" |
| 9 | Raymond Martin (FRA) | Miko–Mercier–Vivagel | + 2' 33" |
| 10 | Julián Andiano (ESP) | Moliner–Vereco | + 2' 45" |

== Stage 8a ==
2 May 1979 — Sedaví to Benicàssim, 145 km (90 mi)

Stage 8a result

| Rank | Rider | Team | Time |
|---|---|---|---|
| 1 | Sean Kelly (IRL) | Splendor–Euro Soap | 4h 27' 39" |
| 2 | Alfons De Wolf (BEL) | Lano–Boule d'Or | s.t. |
| 3 | Miguel María Lasa (ESP) | Moliner–Vereco | s.t. |
| 4 | Christian Levavasseur (FRA) | Miko–Mercier–Vivagel | s.t. |
| 5 | Eulalio García (ESP) | Teka | s.t. |
| 6 | Joop Zoetemelk (NED) | Miko–Mercier–Vivagel | s.t. |
| 7 | | | |
| 8 | Lucien Van Impe (BEL) | Kas–Campagnolo | s.t. |
| 9 | Pedro Torres (ESP) | Transmallorca-Flavia | s.t. |
| 10 | Christian Seznec (FRA) | Miko–Mercier–Vivagel | s.t. |

General classification after Stage 8a

| Rank | Rider | Team | Time |
|---|---|---|---|
| 1 | Christian Levavasseur (FRA) | Miko–Mercier–Vivagel | |
| 2 | Joop Zoetemelk (NED) | Miko–Mercier–Vivagel | + 50" |
| 3 | Felipe Yáñez (ESP) | Novostil-Helios | + 1' 29" |

== Stage 8b ==
2 May 1979 — Benicàssim to Benicàssim, 11.3 km (7.0 mi) (ITT)

Stage 8b result

| Rank | Rider | Team | Time |
|---|---|---|---|
| 1 | Joop Zoetemelk (NED) | Miko–Mercier–Vivagel | 15' 06" |
| 2 | Michel Pollentier (BEL) | Splendor–Euro Soap | + 24" |
| 3 | Alfons De Wolf (BEL) | Lano–Boule d'Or | + 26" |
| 4 | Lucien Van Impe (BEL) | Kas–Campagnolo | + 28" |
| 5 | Francisco Galdós (ESP) | Kas–Campagnolo | + 33" |
| 6 | Eulalio García (ESP) | Teka | + 38" |
| 7 | Roger De Cnijf (BEL) | Lano–Boule d'Or | + 41" |
| 8 | Pedro Torres (ESP) | Transmallorca-Flavia | + 42" |
| 9 | Jesús Manzaneque (ESP) | Colchón CR | s.t. |
| 10 | Jan van Houwelingen (NED) | Lano–Boule d'Or | s.t. |

General classification after Stage 8b

| Rank | Rider | Team | Time |
|---|---|---|---|
| 1 | Christian Levavasseur (FRA) | Miko–Mercier–Vivagel | 39h 59' 56" |
| 2 | Joop Zoetemelk (NED) | Miko–Mercier–Vivagel | + 2" |
| 3 | Felipe Yáñez (ESP) | Novostil-Helios | + 1' 39" |
| 4 | Francisco Galdós (ESP) | Kas–Campagnolo | + 2' 02" |
| 5 | Alfons De Wolf (BEL) | Lano–Boule d'Or | + 2' 05" |
| 6 | Manuel Esparza (ESP) | Teka | + 2' 21" |
| 7 | Pedro Torres (ESP) | Transmallorca-Flavia | + 2' 23" |
| 8 | Lucien Van Impe (BEL) | Kas–Campagnolo | + 2' 27" |
| 9 | Miguel María Lasa (ESP) | Moliner–Vereco | + 2' 30" |
| 10 | Michel Pollentier (BEL) | Splendor–Euro Soap | + 2' 31" |

== Stage 9 ==
3 May 1979 — Benicàssim to Reus, 193 km (120 mi)

Stage 9 result

| Rank | Rider | Team | Time |
|---|---|---|---|
| 1 | Alfons De Wolf (BEL) | Lano–Boule d'Or | 5h 15' 07" |
| 2 | Noël Dejonckheere (BEL) | Teka | s.t. |
| 3 | Herman Beysens (BEL) | Splendor–Euro Soap | s.t. |
| 4 | Erich Jagsch (AUT) | Splendor–Euro Soap | s.t. |
| 5 | Jesús Suárez Cueva (ESP) | Kas–Campagnolo | s.t. |
| 6 | Adri van Houwelingen (NED) | Lano–Boule d'Or | s.t. |
| 7 | Jean-Louis Gauthier (FRA) | Miko–Mercier–Vivagel | s.t. |
| 8 | Frits Pirard (NED) | Miko–Mercier–Vivagel | s.t. |
| 9 | Francisco Elorriaga (ESP) | Novostil-Helios | s.t. |
| 10 | Joël Gallopin (FRA) | Miko–Mercier–Vivagel | s.t. |

General classification after Stage 9

| Rank | Rider | Team | Time |
|---|---|---|---|
| 1 | Christian Levavasseur (FRA) | Miko–Mercier–Vivagel | 45h 15' 03" |
| 2 | Joop Zoetemelk (NED) | Miko–Mercier–Vivagel | + 2" |
| 3 | Felipe Yáñez (ESP) | Novostil-Helios | + 1' 39" |
| 4 | Francisco Galdós (ESP) | Kas–Campagnolo | + 2' 02" |
| 5 | Alfons De Wolf (BEL) | Lano–Boule d'Or | + 2' 05" |
| 6 | Manuel Esparza (ESP) | Teka | + 2' 21" |
| 7 | Pedro Torres (ESP) | Transmallorca-Flavia | + 2' 23" |
| 8 | Lucien Van Impe (BEL) | Kas–Campagnolo | + 2' 27" |
| 9 | Miguel María Lasa (ESP) | Moliner–Vereco | + 2' 30" |
| 10 | Michel Pollentier (BEL) | Splendor–Euro Soap | + 2' 31" |

== Stage 10 ==
4 May 1979 — Reus to Zaragoza, 230 km (140 mi)

Stage 10 result

| Rank | Rider | Team | Time |
|---|---|---|---|
| 1 | Noël Dejonckheere (BEL) | Teka | 6h 47' 07" |
| 2 | Jesús Suárez Cueva (ESP) | Kas–Campagnolo | s.t. |
| 3 | René Dillen (BEL) | Kas–Campagnolo | s.t. |
| 4 | Alfons De Wolf (BEL) | Lano–Boule d'Or | s.t. |
| 5 | Frits Pirard (NED) | Miko–Mercier–Vivagel | s.t. |
| 6 | Daniele Tinchella (ITA) | Teka | s.t. |
| 7 | Adri van Houwelingen (NED) | Lano–Boule d'Or | s.t. |
| 8 | André Mollet (FRA) | Miko–Mercier–Vivagel | s.t. |
| 9 | Francisco Elorriaga (ESP) | Novostil-Helios | s.t. |
| 10 | Enrique Martínez Heredia (ESP) | Kas–Campagnolo | s.t. |

General classification after Stage 10

| Rank | Rider | Team | Time |
|---|---|---|---|
| 1 | Christian Levavasseur (FRA) | Miko–Mercier–Vivagel | 52h 02' 10" |
| 2 | Joop Zoetemelk (NED) | Miko–Mercier–Vivagel | + 2" |
| 3 | Felipe Yáñez (ESP) | Novostil-Helios | + 1' 39" |
| 4 | Francisco Galdós (ESP) | Kas–Campagnolo | + 2' 02" |
| 5 | Alfons De Wolf (BEL) | Lano–Boule d'Or | + 2' 06" |
| 6 | Manuel Esparza (ESP) | Teka | + 2' 21" |
| 7 | Pedro Torres (ESP) | Transmallorca-Flavia | + 2' 23" |
| 8 | Lucien Van Impe (BEL) | Kas–Campagnolo | + 2' 27" |
| 9 | Miguel María Lasa (ESP) | Moliner–Vereco | + 2' 30" |
| 10 | Michel Pollentier (BEL) | Splendor–Euro Soap | + 2' 31" |
