= 1979 Vuelta a España, Stage 11 to Stage 19 =

Cycling race stages

The 1979 Vuelta a España was the 34th edition of the Vuelta a España, one of cycling's Grand Tours. The Vuelta began in Jerez de la Frontera, with a prologue individual time trial on 24 April, and Stage 11 occurred on 5 May with a stage from Zaragoza. The race finished in Madrid on 13 May.

== Stage 11 ==
5 May 1979 — Zaragoza to Pamplona, 183 km (114 mi)

Stage 11 result

Rank	Rider	Team	Time
1	Noël Dejonckheere (BEL)	Teka	5h 29' 35"
2	Sean Kelly (IRL)	Splendor–Euro Soap	s.t.
3	Francisco Elorriaga (ESP)	Novostil-Helios	s.t.
4	Michel Pollentier (BEL)	Splendor–Euro Soap	s.t.
5	Erich Jagsch (AUT)	Splendor–Euro Soap	s.t.
6	Alfons De Wolf (BEL)	Lano–Boule d'Or	s.t.
7	Daniele Tinchella (ITA)	Teka	s.t.
8	Jesús Suárez Cueva (ESP)	Kas–Campagnolo	s.t.
9	Enrique Martínez Heredia (ESP)	Kas–Campagnolo	s.t.
10	Jean-Louis Gauthier (FRA)	Miko–Mercier–Vivagel	s.t.

General classification after Stage 11

Rank	Rider	Team	Time
1	Christian Levavasseur (FRA)	Miko–Mercier–Vivagel	57h 31' 45"
2	Joop Zoetemelk (NED)	Miko–Mercier–Vivagel	+ 2"
3	Felipe Yáñez (ESP)	Novostil-Helios	+ 1' 39"
4	Francisco Galdós (ESP)	Kas–Campagnolo	+ 2' 02"
5	Alfons De Wolf (BEL)	Lano–Boule d'Or	+ 2' 05"
6	Manuel Esparza (ESP)	Teka	+ 2' 21"
7	Pedro Torres (ESP)	Transmallorca-Flavia	+ 2' 23"
8	Lucien Van Impe (BEL)	Kas–Campagnolo	+ 2' 27"
9	Miguel María Lasa (ESP)	Moliner–Vereco	+ 2' 30"
10	Michel Pollentier (BEL)	Splendor–Euro Soap	+ 2' 31"

== Stage 12 ==
6 May 1979 — Pamplona to Logroño, 149 km (93 mi)

Stage 12 result

Rank	Rider	Team	Time
1	Frans Van Vlierberghe (BEL)	Lano–Boule d'Or	3h 49' 19"
2	Antonio Menéndez (ESP)	Moliner–Vereco	s.t.
3	Alfons De Wolf (BEL)	Lano–Boule d'Or	+ 2' 12"
4	Noël Dejonckheere (BEL)	Teka	s.t.
5	Patrick Verstraete (BEL)	Lano–Boule d'Or	s.t.
6	Herman Beysens (BEL)	Splendor–Euro Soap	s.t.
7	Jesús Suárez Cueva (ESP)	Kas–Campagnolo	s.t.
8	Jean-Louis Gauthier (FRA)	Miko–Mercier–Vivagel	s.t.
9	Sean Kelly (IRL)	Splendor–Euro Soap	s.t.
10	Daniele Tinchella (ITA)	Teka	s.t.

General classification after Stage 12

Rank	Rider	Team	Time
1	Christian Levavasseur (FRA)	Miko–Mercier–Vivagel	61h 23' 16"
2	Joop Zoetemelk (NED)	Miko–Mercier–Vivagel	+ 2"
3	Felipe Yáñez (ESP)	Novostil-Helios	+ 1' 39"
4	Francisco Galdós (ESP)	Kas–Campagnolo	+ 2' 02"
5	Alfons De Wolf (BEL)	Lano–Boule d'Or	+ 2' 05"
6	Manuel Esparza (ESP)	Teka	+ 2' 21"
7	Pedro Torres (ESP)	Transmallorca-Flavia	+ 2' 23"
8	Lucien Van Impe (BEL)	Kas–Campagnolo	+ 2' 27"
9	Miguel María Lasa (ESP)	Moliner–Vereco	+ 2' 30"
10	Michel Pollentier (BEL)	Splendor–Euro Soap	+ 2' 31"

== Stage 13 ==
7 May 1979 — Haro to Peña Cabarga, 180 km (110 mi)

Stage 13 result

Rank	Rider	Team	Time
1	Ángel López del Álamo (ESP)	Colchón CR	5h 18' 04"
2	Lucien Van Impe (BEL)	Kas–Campagnolo	+ 2' 33"
3	Manuel Esparza (ESP)	Teka	s.t.
4	Joop Zoetemelk (NED)	Miko–Mercier–Vivagel	s.t.
5	Francisco Galdós (ESP)	Kas–Campagnolo	+ 2' 36"
6	Felipe Yáñez (ESP)	Novostil-Helios	s.t.
7	Pedro Torres (ESP)	Transmallorca-Flavia	+ 2' 54"
8	Raymond Martin (FRA)	Miko–Mercier–Vivagel	+ 2' 59"
9	Christian Seznec (FRA)	Miko–Mercier–Vivagel	+ 3' 06"
10	Michel Pollentier (BEL)	Splendor–Euro Soap	+ 3' 11"

General classification after Stage 13

Rank	Rider	Team	Time
1	Joop Zoetemelk (NED)	Miko–Mercier–Vivagel	66h 41' 20"
2	Felipe Yáñez (ESP)	Novostil-Helios	+ 1' 40"
3	Francisco Galdós (ESP)	Kas–Campagnolo	+ 2' 03"
4	Manuel Esparza (ESP)	Teka	+ 2' 13"
5	Pedro Torres (ESP)	Transmallorca-Flavia	+ 2' 42"
6	Michel Pollentier (BEL)	Splendor–Euro Soap	+ 3' 07"
7	Christian Levavasseur (FRA)	Miko–Mercier–Vivagel	+ 3' 56"
8	Faustino Rupérez (ESP)	Moliner–Vereco	+ 3' 58"
9	Lucien Van Impe (BEL)	Kas–Campagnolo	+ 4' 05"
10	Vicente López Carril (ESP)	Teka	+ 4' 09"

== Stage 14 ==
8 May 1979 — Torrelavega to Gijón, 178 km (111 mi)

Stage 14 result

Rank	Rider	Team	Time
1	Bernardo Alfonsel (ESP)	Kas–Campagnolo	4h 48' 28"
2	Joop Zoetemelk (NED)	Miko–Mercier–Vivagel	+ 5' 21"
3	José Enrique Cima (ESP)	Transmallorca-Flavia	s.t.
4	Ludo Loos (BEL)	Splendor–Euro Soap	s.t.
5	Herman Beysens (BEL)	Splendor–Euro Soap	s.t.
6	Felipe Yáñez (ESP)	Novostil-Helios	s.t.
7	Faustino Rupérez (ESP)	Moliner–Vereco	s.t.
8	Francisco Galdós (ESP)	Kas–Campagnolo	s.t.
9	Pedro Torres (ESP)	Transmallorca-Flavia	s.t.
10	José Luis Mayoz Aizpurua (ESP)	Novostil-Helios	s.t.

General classification after Stage 14

Rank	Rider	Team	Time
1	Joop Zoetemelk (NED)	Miko–Mercier–Vivagel	71h 37' 42"
2	Felipe Yáñez (ESP)	Novostil-Helios	+ 1' 40"
3	Francisco Galdós (ESP)	Kas–Campagnolo	+ 2' 03"
4	Manuel Esparza (ESP)	Teka	+ 2' 13"
5	Pedro Torres (ESP)	Transmallorca-Flavia	+ 2' 42"
6	Michel Pollentier (BEL)	Splendor–Euro Soap	+ 3' 07"
7	Christian Levavasseur (FRA)	Miko–Mercier–Vivagel	+ 3' 56"
8	Faustino Rupérez (ESP)	Moliner–Vereco	+ 3' 58"
9	Lucien Van Impe (BEL)	Kas–Campagnolo	+ 4' 05"
10	Vicente López Carril (ESP)	Teka	+ 4' 09"

== Stage 15 ==
9 May 1979 — Gijón to León, 156 km (97 mi)

Stage 15 result

Rank	Rider	Team	Time
1	Lucien Van Impe (BEL)	Kas–Campagnolo	3h 50' 01"
2	Enrique Martínez Heredia (ESP)	Kas–Campagnolo	+ 6"
3	Michel Pollentier (BEL)	Splendor–Euro Soap	s.t.
4	Christian Seznec (FRA)	Miko–Mercier–Vivagel	s.t.
5	Antonio Menéndez (ESP)	Moliner–Vereco	s.t.
6	Faustino Rupérez (ESP)	Moliner–Vereco	s.t.
7	Joop Zoetemelk (NED)	Miko–Mercier–Vivagel	s.t.
8	Manuel Esparza (ESP)	Teka	s.t.
9	Francisco Galdós (ESP)	Kas–Campagnolo	s.t.
10	José Pesarrodona (ESP)	Teka	s.t.

General classification after Stage 15

Rank	Rider	Team	Time
1	Joop Zoetemelk (NED)	Miko–Mercier–Vivagel	75h 27' 49"
2	Francisco Galdós (ESP)	Kas–Campagnolo	+ 2' 03"
3	Manuel Esparza (ESP)	Teka	+ 2' 19"
4	Michel Pollentier (BEL)	Splendor–Euro Soap	+ 3' 07"
5	Faustino Rupérez (ESP)	Moliner–Vereco	+ 3' 58"
6	Felipe Yáñez (ESP)	Novostil-Helios	+ 4' 41"
7	Lucien Van Impe (BEL)	Kas–Campagnolo	+ 4' 59"
8	Pedro Torres (ESP)	Transmallorca-Flavia	+ 5' 43"
9	Christian Seznec (FRA)	Miko–Mercier–Vivagel	+ 6' 45"
10	Vicente López Carril (ESP)	Teka	+ 8' 10"

== Stage 16a ==
10 May 1979 — León to Valladolid, 134 km (83 mi)

Stage 16a result

Rank	Rider	Team	Time
1	Adri van Houwelingen (NED)	Lano–Boule d'Or	3h 11' 10"
2	Manuel Martin Conde (ESP)	Moliner–Vereco	s.t.
3	Herman Beysens (BEL)	Splendor–Euro Soap	s.t.
4	Eulalio García (ESP)	Teka	+ 21"
5	Frits Pirard (NED)	Miko–Mercier–Vivagel	+ 37"
6	José María Yurrebaso (ESP)	Novostil-Helios	s.t.
7	José Nazabal (ESP)	Kas–Campagnolo	s.t.
8	Juan Pujol Pagés (ESP)	Transmallorca-Flavia	s.t.
9	Custódio Mazuela Castillo (ESP)	Novostil-Helios	+ 42"
10	Noël Dejonckheere (BEL)	Teka	+ 1' 11"

General classification after Stage 16a

Rank	Rider	Team	Time
1	Joop Zoetemelk (NED)	Miko–Mercier–Vivagel	
2	Francisco Galdós (ESP)	Kas–Campagnolo	+ 2' 03"
3	Manuel Esparza (ESP)	Teka	+ 2' 19"

== Stage 16b ==
10 May 1979 — Valladolid to Valladolid, 22 km (14 mi) (ITT)

Stage 16b result

Rank	Rider	Team	Time
1	Alfons De Wolf (BEL)	Lano–Boule d'Or	27' 36"
2	Joop Zoetemelk (NED)	Miko–Mercier–Vivagel	+ 21"
3	Michel Pollentier (BEL)	Splendor–Euro Soap	+ 35"
4	Jan van Houwelingen (NED)	Lano–Boule d'Or	+ 54"
5	Roger De Cnijf (BEL)	Lano–Boule d'Or	+ 58"
6	Francisco Galdós (ESP)	Kas–Campagnolo	+ 1' 01"
7	Manuel Esparza (ESP)	Teka	+ 1' 24"
8	Enrique Martínez Heredia (ESP)	Kas–Campagnolo	+ 1' 25"
9	Pedro Torres (ESP)	Transmallorca-Flavia	+ 1' 27"
10	José Pesarrodona (ESP)	Teka	+ 1' 35"

General classification after Stage 16b

Rank	Rider	Team	Time
1	Joop Zoetemelk (NED)	Miko–Mercier–Vivagel	79h 08' 06"
2	Francisco Galdós (ESP)	Kas–Campagnolo	+ 2' 43"
3	Michel Pollentier (BEL)	Splendor–Euro Soap	+ 3' 21"
4	Manuel Esparza (ESP)	Teka	+ 3' 22"
5	Faustino Rupérez (ESP)	Moliner–Vereco	+ 5' 51"
6	Lucien Van Impe (BEL)	Kas–Campagnolo	+ 6' 30"
7	Pedro Torres (ESP)	Transmallorca-Flavia	+ 6' 49"
8	Felipe Yáñez (ESP)	Novostil-Helios	+ 7' 41"
9	Christian Seznec (FRA)	Miko–Mercier–Vivagel	+ 8' 08"
10	Alfons De Wolf (BEL)	Lano–Boule d'Or	+ 9' 51"

== Stage 17 ==
11 May 1979 — Valladolid to Ávila, 204 km (127 mi)

Stage 17 result

Rank	Rider	Team	Time
1	Francisco Albelda (ESP)	Transmallorca-Flavia	6h 18' 49"
2	Alfons De Wolf (BEL)	Lano–Boule d'Or	+ 1' 17"
3	Jesús Suárez Cueva (ESP)	Kas–Campagnolo	s.t.
4	Michel Pollentier (BEL)	Splendor–Euro Soap	s.t.
5	René Dillen (BEL)	Kas–Campagnolo	s.t.
6	Herman Beysens (BEL)	Splendor–Euro Soap	s.t.
7	Christian Seznec (FRA)	Miko–Mercier–Vivagel	s.t.
8	Pedro Torres (ESP)	Transmallorca-Flavia	s.t.
9	Joop Zoetemelk (NED)	Miko–Mercier–Vivagel	s.t.
10	Adri van Houwelingen (NED)	Lano–Boule d'Or	s.t.

General classification after Stage 17

Rank	Rider	Team	Time
1	Joop Zoetemelk (NED)	Miko–Mercier–Vivagel	85h 28' 12"
2	Francisco Galdós (ESP)	Kas–Campagnolo	+ 2' 38"
3	Michel Pollentier (BEL)	Splendor–Euro Soap	+ 3' 21"
4	Manuel Esparza (ESP)	Teka	+ 3' 22"
5	Faustino Rupérez (ESP)	Moliner–Vereco	+ 5' 51"
6	Lucien Van Impe (BEL)	Kas–Campagnolo	+ 6' 30"
7	Pedro Torres (ESP)	Transmallorca-Flavia	+ 6' 49"
8	Felipe Yáñez (ESP)	Novostil-Helios	+ 7' 41"
9	Christian Seznec (FRA)	Miko–Mercier–Vivagel	+ 8' 08"
10	Alfons De Wolf (BEL)	Lano–Boule d'Or	+ 9' 51"

== Stage 18a ==
12 May 1979 — Ávila to Colmenar Viejo, 155 km (96 mi)

Stage 18a result

Rank	Rider	Team	Time
1	Miguel María Lasa (ESP)	Moliner–Vereco	4h 43' 25"
2	Christian Seznec (FRA)	Miko–Mercier–Vivagel	+ 1' 22"
3	Vicente Belda (ESP)	Transmallorca-Flavia	s.t.
4	Jesús Suárez Cueva (ESP)	Kas–Campagnolo	+ 1' 25"
5	Ludo Loos (BEL)	Splendor–Euro Soap	+ 1' 27"
6	Francisco Elorriaga (ESP)	Novostil-Helios	s.t.
7	Pedro Torres (ESP)	Transmallorca-Flavia	s.t.
8	Joop Zoetemelk (NED)	Miko–Mercier–Vivagel	s.t.
9	Lucien Van Impe (BEL)	Kas–Campagnolo	s.t.
10	Michel Pollentier (BEL)	Splendor–Euro Soap	s.t.

General classification after Stage 18a

Rank	Rider	Team	Time
1	Joop Zoetemelk (NED)	Miko–Mercier–Vivagel	
2	Francisco Galdós (ESP)	Kas–Campagnolo	+ 2' 43"
3	Michel Pollentier (BEL)	Splendor–Euro Soap	+ 3' 21"

== Stage 18b ==
12 May 1979 — Colmenar Viejo to Azuqueca de Henares, 104 km (65 mi)

Stage 18b result

Rank	Rider	Team	Time
1	Cees Bal (NED)	Lano–Boule d'Or	2h 43' 55"
2	José Antonio González (ESP)	Teka	s.t.
3	Enrique Martínez Heredia (ESP)	Kas–Campagnolo	+ 2' 35"
4	Daniele Tinchella (ITA)	Teka	s.t.
5	Frits Pirard (NED)	Miko–Mercier–Vivagel	s.t.
6	Miguel Gutiérrez Mayor (ESP)	Teka	s.t.
7	Rafael Ladrón (ESP)	Kas–Campagnolo	s.t.
8	Raymond Martin (FRA)	Miko–Mercier–Vivagel	s.t.
9	Jan van Houwelingen (NED)	Lano–Boule d'Or	s.t.
10	Ismael Lejarreta (ESP)	Novostil-Helios	s.t.

General classification after Stage 18b

Rank	Rider	Team	Time
1	Joop Zoetemelk (NED)	Miko–Mercier–Vivagel	92h 59' 34"
2	Francisco Galdós (ESP)	Kas–Campagnolo	+ 2' 41"
3	Michel Pollentier (BEL)	Splendor–Euro Soap	+ 3' 21"
4	Manuel Esparza (ESP)	Teka	+ 3' 22"
5	Faustino Rupérez (ESP)	Moliner–Vereco	+ 5' 51"
6	Lucien Van Impe (BEL)	Kas–Campagnolo	+ 6' 30"
7	Pedro Torres (ESP)	Transmallorca-Flavia	+ 6' 49"
8	Felipe Yáñez (ESP)	Novostil-Helios	+ 7' 41"
9	Christian Seznec (FRA)	Miko–Mercier–Vivagel	+ 8' 03"
10	Alfons De Wolf (BEL)	Lano–Boule d'Or	+ 10' 01"

== Stage 19 ==
13 May 1979 — Madrid to Madrid, 84 km (52 mi)

Stage 19 result

Rank	Rider	Team	Time
1	Alfons De Wolf (BEL)	Lano–Boule d'Or	1h 57' 31"
2	Adri van Houwelingen (NED)	Lano–Boule d'Or	s.t.
3	Christian Seznec (FRA)	Miko–Mercier–Vivagel	s.t.
4	Noël Dejonckheere (BEL)	Teka	s.t.
5	Francisco Elorriaga (ESP)	Novostil-Helios	s.t.
6	Patrick Friou (FRA)	Miko–Mercier–Vivagel	s.t.
7	Jesús Suárez Cueva (ESP)	Kas–Campagnolo	s.t.
8	Miguel María Lasa (ESP)	Moliner–Vereco	s.t.
9	Frits Pirard (NED)	Miko–Mercier–Vivagel	s.t.
10	Erich Jagsch (AUT)	Splendor–Euro Soap	s.t.

General classification after Stage 19

Rank	Rider	Team	Time
1	Joop Zoetemelk (NED)	Miko–Mercier–Vivagel	94h 57' 03"
2	Francisco Galdós (ESP)	Kas–Campagnolo	+ 2' 41"
3	Michel Pollentier (BEL)	Splendor–Euro Soap	+ 3' 21"
4	Manuel Esparza (ESP)	Teka	+ 3' 22"
5	Faustino Rupérez (ESP)	Moliner–Vereco	+ 5' 51"
6	Lucien Van Impe (BEL)	Kas–Campagnolo	+ 6' 30"
7	Pedro Torres (ESP)	Transmallorca-Flavia	+ 6' 49"
8	Felipe Yáñez (ESP)	Novostil-Helios	+ 7' 41"
9	Christian Seznec (FRA)	Miko–Mercier–Vivagel	+ 8' 03"
10	Alfons De Wolf (BEL)	Lano–Boule d'Or	+ 10' 01"
