= 1979 Vuelta a España =

Race details
- Dates: 24 April – 13 May
- Stages: 19 stages + Prologue, including 3 split stages
- Distance: 3,373 km (2,096 mi)
- Winning time: 94h 57' 03"

Results
Jersey awarded to the overall winner	Winner	Joop Zoetemelk (NED)	(Miko–Mercier)
	Second	Francisco Galdós (ESP)	(Kas)
	Third	Michel Pollentier (BEL)	(Splendor)
Jersey awarded to the points classification winner	Points	Alfons De Wolf (BEL)	(Boule d'Or–Lano)
Jersey awarded to the mountains classification winner	Mountains	Felipe Yáñez (ESP)	(Novostil–Helios)
	Sprints	Roger De Cnijf (BEL)	(Boule d'Or–Lano)
	Team	Kas	

The 34th Edition Vuelta a España (Tour of Spain), a long-distance bicycle stage race and one of the three grand tours, was held from 24 April to 13 May 1979. It consisted of 19 stages covering a total of 3,373 km (2,096 mi), and was won by Joop Zoetemelk of the Miko–Mercier cycling team. Zoetemelk won two of the three ITT's and Fons De Wolf won the other. De Wolf also won the points classification as well as five stages, but Zoetemelk won the race with a comfortable lead ahead of Spanish climbing specialist Francisco Galdós and Michel Pollentier. Felipe Yáñez won the mountains classification.

== Route ==
List of stages
Stage	Date	Course	Distance	Type	Winner
P	24 April	Jerez de la Frontera to Jerez de la Frontera	6.3 km (4 mi)	Individual time trial	Joop Zoetemelk (NED)
1	25 April	Jerez de la Frontera to Seville	156 km (97 mi)		Sean Kelly (IRL)
2	26 April	Seville to Córdoba	188 km (117 mi)		Alfons De Wolf (BEL)
3	27 April	Córdoba to Sierra Nevada	190 km (118 mi)		Felipe Yáñez (ESP)
4	28 April	Granada to Puerto Lumbreras	222 km (138 mi)		Roger De Cnijf (BEL)
5	29 April	Puerto Lumbreras to Murcia	139 km (86 mi)		Juan Argudo (ESP)
6	30 April	Murcia to Alcoy	171 km (106 mi)		Christian Levavasseur (FRA)
7	1 May	Alcoy to Sedaví	173 km (107 mi)		Alfons De Wolf (BEL)
8a	2 May	Sedaví to Benicàssim	145 km (90 mi)		Sean Kelly (IRL)
8b	2 May	Benicàssim to Benicàssim	11.3 km (7 mi)	Individual time trial	Joop Zoetemelk (NED)
9	3 May	Benicàssim to Reus	193 km (120 mi)		Alfons De Wolf (BEL)
10	4 May	Reus to Zaragoza	230 km (143 mi)		Noël Dejonckheere (BEL)
11	5 May	Zaragoza to Pamplona	183 km (114 mi)		Noël Dejonckheere (BEL)
12	6 May	Pamplona to Logroño	149 km (93 mi)		Frans Van Vlierberghe (BEL)
13	7 May	Haro to Peña Cabarga	180 km (112 mi)		Ángel López del Álamo (ESP)
14	8 May	Torrelavega to Gijón	178 km (111 mi)		Bernardo Alfonsel (ESP)
15	9 May	Gijón to León	156 km (97 mi)		Lucien Van Impe (BEL)
16a	10 May	León to Valladolid	134 km (83 mi)		Adri van Houwelingen (NED)
16b	10 May	Valladolid to Valladolid	22 km (14 mi)	Individual time trial	Alfons De Wolf (BEL)
17	11 May	Valladolid to Ávila	204 km (127 mi)		Francisco Albelda (ESP)
18a	12 May	Ávila to Colmenar Viejo	155 km (96 mi)		Miguel María Lasa (ESP)
18b	12 May	Colmenar Viejo to Azuqueca de Henares	104 km (65 mi)		Cees Bal (NED)
19	13 May	Madrid to Madrid	84 km (52 mi)		Alfons De Wolf (BEL)
	Total		3,373 km (2,096 mi)		

== Results ==
=== Final General Classification ===
Rank	Rider	Team	Time
1	(Netherlands) Joop Zoetemelk	Miko–Mercier	94h 57' 03"
2	(Spain) Francisco Galdós	Kas–Campagnolo	+ 2' 43"
3	(Belgium) Michel Pollentier	Splendor–Euro Soap	+ 3' 21"
4	(Spain) Faustino Rupérez	Moliner–Vereco	+ 5' 51"
5	(Belgium) Lucien Van Impe	Kas–Campagnolo	+ 6' 30"
6	(Spain) Pedro Torres	Transmallorca–Flavia	+ 6' 49"
7	(Spain) Felipe Yáñez	Novostil–Helios	+ 7' 41"
8	(France) Christian Seznec	Miko–Mercier	+ 8' 03"
9	(Belgium) Fons De Wolf	Boule d'Or–Lano	+ 10' 01"
10	(Spain) Julián Andiano	Moliner–Vereco	+ 10' 52"
11	(Spain) Miguel María Lasa	Moliner–Vereco	
12	(Spain) Vicente López Carril	Teka	
13	(France) Raymond Martin	Miko–Mercier	
14	(Spain) Alberto Fernández	Moliner–Vereco	
15	(Belgium) Herman Beysens	Splendor–Euro Soap	
16	(Spain) Manuel Esparza Sanz	Teka	
17	(Spain) Vicente Belda	Transmallorca–Flavia	
18	(Spain) José Pesarrodona	Teka	
19	(Spain) Ángel Arroyo	Moliner–Vereco	
20	(Spain) Juan Pujol Pages	Transmallorca–Flavia	
21	(Spain) Ismael Lejarreta	Novostil–Helios	
22	(Spain) Carlos Melero	Moliner–Vereco	
23	(Spain) Bernardo Alfonsel	Kas–Campagnolo	
24	(Spain) Jesús Suárez	Kas–Campagnolo	
25	(Spain) Gonzalo Aja Barguin	Novostil–Helios	
