= 1976 Grote Prijs Jef Scherens =

Race details
- Dates: 19 September 1976
- Stages: 1
- Distance: 214 km (133.0 mi)
- Winning time: 5h 03' 00"

Results
	Winner	Frans Verbeeck (BEL)
	Second	Etienne Van Der Helst (BEL)
	Third	Walter Naegels (BEL)

The 1976 Grote Prijs Jef Scherens was the 12th edition of the Grote Prijs Jef Scherens cycle race and was held on 19 September 1976. The race started and finished in Leuven. The race was won by Frans Verbeeck.

== General classification ==
Final general classification

Rank	Rider	Time
1	Frans Verbeeck (BEL)	5h 03' 00"
2	Etienne Van Der Helst (BEL)	+ 0"
3	Walter Naegels (BEL)	+ 23"
4	Franky De Gendt (BEL)	+ 23"
5	Jos Deschoenmaecker (BEL)	+ 23"
6	Aad van den Hoek (NED)	+ 23"
7	Marcel Laurens (BEL)	+ 23"
8	Jan Raas (NED)	+ 23"
9	Eric Leman (BEL)	+ 23"
10	Lieven Malfait (BEL)	+ 23"
