= Kelme (cycling team) =

Spanish cycling team (1980–2006)

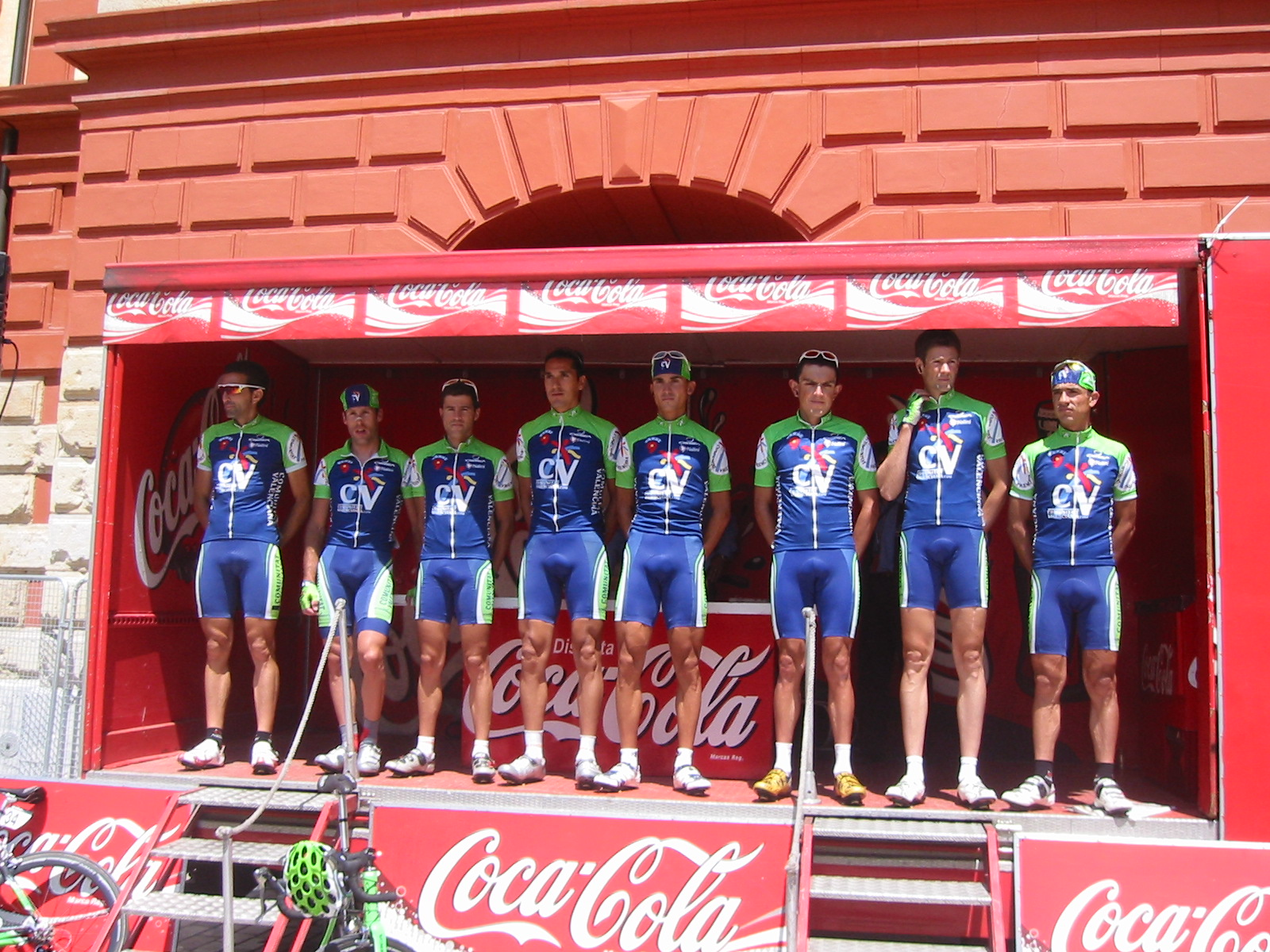
- The team in Comunidad Valenciana jerseys during their penultimate season in 2005

Team information
- UCI code: KEL
- Registered: Spain
- Founded: 1980
- Disbanded: 2006
- Discipline: Road

Team name history
- 1980–1981 1982 1983–1984 1985 1986–1989 1990–1991 1992 1993 1994 1995 1996 1997 1998–2003 2004 2005 2006: Kelme–Gios; Kelme–Merckx; Kelme; Kelme–Merckx; Kelme; Kelme–Ibexpress; Kelme–Don Cafe; Kelme–Xacobeo; Kelme–Avianca–Gios; Kelme–Sureña; Kelme–Artiach; Kelme–Costa Blanca–Eurosport; Kelme–Costa Blanca; Comunidad Valenciana–Kelme; Comunidad Valenciana–Elche; Comunidad Valenciana

Kelme was a professional cycling team based in Spain.

== History ==
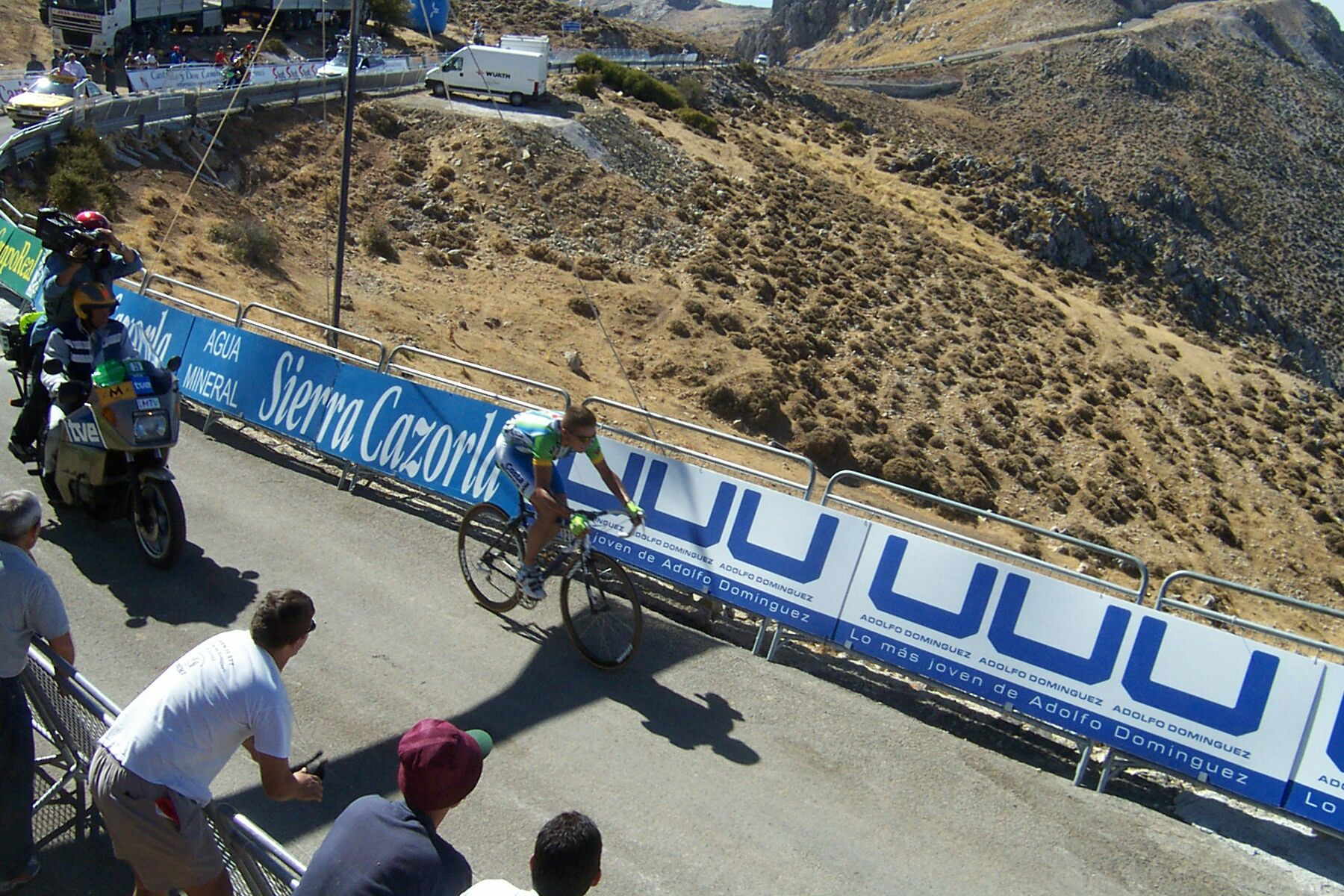
Óscar Sevilla riding for Kelme in 2002

In 1979, Kelme sponsored the mountains classification in the Vuelta a España. The owners of Kelme were not satisfied with the publicity that this produced, so they decided to sponsor a cycling team instead.

The Kelme team was formed from another Spanish cycling team, Transmallorca, in 1980. From the 2004 cycling season, the Valencian government took the main sponsorship, Kelme becoming co-sponsor, finally dropping from the team at the end of the year. Despite this, the team kept on running, but its days were numbered when on 20 August 2006, because of doping allegations on Operación Puerto, the Valencian government dropped its sponsorship. This was to become the last year for the oldest team in the peloton. The last couple of years, it was managed by Vicente Belda, a former cyclist who rode for the team from 1980 to 1988. Famous former riders included Alejandro Valverde, Roberto Heras, Aitor González, Óscar Sevilla, Ángel Casero, and Fernando Escartín. The team's major results include two wins in the Vuelta a España: by Roberto Heras in 2000 and Aitor González in 2002.

== Doping controversy ==
In March 2004, in an interview with the Spanish newspaper AS, the former Kelme cyclist Jesús Manzano exposed the systematic doping in the team. During the interview he detailed blood doping as well as the various performance-enhancing drugs he used while on the team. Immediately the Kelme team denied the allegations, and Jean-Marie Leblanc, the director of the Tour de France, was also sceptical about the allegations. After more detailed revelations, the Kelme team who had been invited to the 2004 Tour de France had their invitation withdrawn.

The subsequent investigation into Manzano's doping activities and the allegations he made led to the questioning of several members of the Kelme team in April 2004. These included Eufemiano Fuentes, who was at that time the Kelme team doctor; Walter Virú, the previous team doctor; and Alfredo Córdova, who was working for Liberty Seguros but had been involved with Kelme in 2003.

An investigation began into the practises of Fuentes in early 2006 by Central Operating Unit, the anti-drug trafficking arm of the Spanish Guardia Civil. In May 2006, several arrests were made. Manzano's statements had led directly to the development of this investigation. In June 2007 Manzano claimed that Alejandro Valverde doped with testosterone during the 2002 Vuelta a España.

== Major wins ==
1980
Circuito de Getxo, Felipe Yáñez de la Torre
GP Llodio, Felipe Yáñez de la Torre
Stage 6, Vuelta a Cantabria, Francisco Ramon Albelda
1981
Stage 11 Vuelta a España, Jesús Suárez
Memorial Manuel Galera, Juan Fernández
Memoria Santi Andia, Jesús Suárez
2 stages Vuelta a Aragón
Stage 2, Vuelta Asturias, Jesús Suárez
Stage 5, Vuelta a Cantabria, Jesús Suárez
Stage 1, Deutschland Tour, Juan Fernández
1982
Stage 7, Vuelta a España, Enrique Martinez
Memorial Manuel Galera, Jesús Delgado
Clásica a los Puertos de Guadarrama, Vicente Belda
Overall and 1 stage, Vuelta Asturias
Overall and prologue, Costa del Azahar
Madrid six days
Stage 4, Tour of the Basque Country
1983
Memorial Manuel Galera, Jesús Delgado
Subida al Naranco, Vicente Belda
Alqueiras, Francisco Ramon Albelda
Prueba Villafranca de Ordizia, José Recio
Stage 3, Vuelta a La Rioja, Miguel Guerrero
1984
Subida a Urkiola, Vicente Belda
Subida al Naranco, Vicente Belda
Stage 6b, Vuelta Asturias, Miguel Angel Guerrero
1985
Overall, Vuelta a Murcia, José Recio
Subida al Naranco, José-Alirio Chizabas
Circuito de Getxo, Antonio Esparza
Bages, Miguel Angel Guerrero
Segovia, Miguel Angel Guerrero
1986
Subida a Urkiola, Oscar J. Vargas
1987
Memorial Manuel Galera, Juan Martinéz
1988
Stage 4, Setmana Catalana de Ciclisme, Jaime Vilamajo
1989
Stage 3, Vuelta a Murcia, Juan Martinéz
1990
Mountains classification, 1990 Vuelta a España
1991
Stage 2, Vuelta a los valles Mineros
1992
Memorial Manuel Galera, Francisco Cabello
GP Llodio, Ángel Edo
Clásica a los Puertos de Guadarrama, Oswaldo Mora
Russia Road Race championship
Stage 6, Criterium du Critérium du Dauphiné Libéré
1993
Spain Road Race championship
Trofeo Mallorca, Asiat Saitov
1994
Overall, Challenge Mallorca, Francisco Cabello
Trofeo Masferrer, Ángel Edo
Trofeo Soller, Ángel Edo
GP Llodio, Asiat Saitov
Stage 1, Vuelta a Andalucía Vuelta a Andalucía, Ángel Edo
Stage 4, Route du Sud, Asiat Saitov
1995
Memorial Manuel Galera, Ignacio Garcia Camacho
Overall and 3 stages, Vuelta a Colombia
Stage 3, Vuelta an Andalucía, Ruta del Sol, Francisco Cabello
1996
Overall, Challenge Mallorca, Francisco Cabello
Trofeo Soller, Francisco Cabello
Clásica a los Puertos de Guadarrama, Fernando Escartín
Stage 13, Vuelta a Colombia, Julio Cabrera
Stage 3, Vuelta a Castilla y León, Mariano Moreda
Stage 2, Vuelta Asturias, Mariano Moreda
1997
Stage 12, Vuelta a España, Roberto Heras
Overall and 1 stage, Setmana Catalana de Ciclisme
Overall, Volta a la Comunitat Valenciana, Juan Carlos Domínguez
Overall and 2 stages, Vuelta a Murcia
Overall and 1 stage, Volta a Catalunya
Subida al Naranco, Roberto Heras
Stage 2, Vuelta Asturias, Fernando Escartín
1998
Klasika Primavera, Roberto Heras
Subida al Naranco, José-Luis Rubiera
Clásica a los Puertos de Guadarrama, Marcos Serrano
Stage 8, Volta a Catalunya, Fernando Escartín
Stage 1, Vuelta a Aragón, Fernando Escartín
1999
Overall and 1 stage, Vuelta an Andalucía, Ruta del Sol
Klasika Primavera, Roberto Heras
Trofeo Calvià, Francisco Cabello
Castillon-la-Bataille, Fernando Escartín
Stage 5, Paris–Nice, Santiago Botero
Stage 4, Tour de Romandie, Óscar Sevilla
2 stages Euskal Bizikleta
2 stages, Vuelta a Murcia
2 stages, Vuelta Asturias
Stage 4, Vuelta a Aragón, Eduardo Hernandez
Stage 6, Volta a Catalunya, Roberto Heras
2000
Overall and 2 stages, 2000 Vuelta a España
2 stages and Mountains Classification 2000 Tour de France
Stage 13, Giro d'Italia, José-Luis Rubiera
Overall, Challenge Mallorca, Francisco Cabello
Trofeo Antratx, Francisco Cabello
Clásica de Almería, Isaac Gálvez
Six Jours de Grenoble, Isaac Gálvez
Critérium Foral de Navarra, Roberto Heras
Prueba Villafranca de Ordizia, Javier Otxoa
Subida al Naranco, José-Luis Rubiera
Memorial Manuel Galera, Óscar Sevilla
Trofeo Luis Ocaña, Óscar Sevilla
Stage 2, Vuelta a Murcia, Francisco Cabello
Stage 3, Tour du Limousin, Aitor González
Stage 4, Tour du Limousin, Félix Cárdenas
Stage 2, Volta ao Algarve, Aitor González
2 stages, Vuelta a la Communidad Valenciana
2001
1 stage and Young rider classification Tour de France
Overall and 2 stages Vuelta Ciclista a Murcia
Clásica a los Puertos de Guadarrama, Santiago Botero Echeverry
Clásica de Sabiñánigo, Angel Vicioso Arcos
GP Miguel Induráin, Angel Vicioso Arcos
GP Llodio, Juan José de los Ángeles Segui
2 stages Tour de l'Avenir
Stage 2 GP Mosqueteiros – Rota do Marquês, Marina Grande, Isaac Gálvez Lopez
Stage 2 Volta ao Alentejo, Grandola, Isaac Gálvez Lopez
Stage 4 Volta ao Alentejo, Alandroal, Angel Vicioso Arcos
Stage 1b Vuelta a Castilla y León, El Espinar, Javier Pascual Llorente
Stage 5 Vuelta a Castilla y León, Alto del Redondal, Javier Pascual Llorente
Stage 1 Volta a Portugal, Odivelas, Constantino Zaballa Gutierrez
Stage 6 Circuito Montañés, Torrelavega, Eligio Requeio Dominguez
2002
2 stages 2002 Tour de France, Santiago Botero
2 stages Giro d'Italia
1st overall 2002 Vuelta a España, Aitor González Jimenez
World Time Trial championships, Botero
1st overall Challenge Mallorca, Francisco Cabello
Trofeo Mallorca, Isaac Gálvez Lopez
Valencia, Óscar Sevilla Ribera
GP Miguel Induráin, Angel Vicioso Arcos
Klasika Primavera, Angel Vicioso Arcos
Stage 3 Critérium du Dauphiné Libéré, Pierrelatte, Santiago Botero Echeverry
Stage 7 Critérium du Dauphiné Libéré, Genève, José Enrique Gutiérrez Cataluña
Trofeo de Palma, Palma, Isaac Gálvez Lopez
Classique des Alpes, Santiago Botero Echeverry
Profronde van Pijnacker, Santiago Botero Echeverry
Profronde van Surhuisterveen, Santiago Botero Echeverry
Stage 7 Volta a Portugal, Alcobaça, David Muñoz Bañón
Stage 8 Volta a Portugal, Castelo Branco, Alexis Rodriguez Hernandez
2003
1st 2 stages, Combination classification 2003 Vuelta a España
1st overall Challenge Mallorca, Alejandro Valverde Belmonte
Trofeo Mallorca, Palma, Isaac Gálvez Lopez
1st overall and 2 stages Vuelta Ciclista a Murcia, Javier Pascual Llorente
Criterium Valencia, Alejandro Valverde Belmonte
Prueba Villafranca de Ordizia, Alejandro Valverde Belmonte
Circuito de Getxo, Roberto Lozano Montero
Trofeo Alcudia, Porto Cristo, Isaac Gálvez Lopez
Stage 4a Troféu Joaquim Agostinho, Ribemar, Alejandro Valverde Belmonte
Stage 5a Troféu Joaquim Agostinho, Ribemar, Alejandro Valverde Belmonte
Stage 3 Vuelta an Andalucía, Ruta del Sol, Altro Ntra. Sra.de Araceli, Lucena, Javier Pascual Llorente
Stage 4 Volta a Catalunya, Llívia, Jesus Maria Manzano Ruano
Stage 3 Vuelta Ciclista an Aragón, Illueca, Alejandro Valverde Belmonte
Stage 3 Tour of the Basque Country, Vitoria, Alejandro Valverde Belmonte
2004
4 stages 2004 Vuelta a España
1st overall and 2 stages, Vuelta Ciclista a la Communidad Valenciana
1st overall Vuelta Ciclista a Murcia
1st overall and 3 stages Vuelta Ciclista a Burgos
1st overall and 2 stages GP Estremadura – RTP
Trofeo Manacor
Klasika Primavera
2 stages Tour of the Basque Country
3 stages Vuelta a Castilla y León
Stage 5 Troféu Joaquim Agostinho
Stage 4a Vuelta de la Paz
Stage 4 Clásica de Fusagasugá, Circuit Fusagasuga, Iván Ramiro Parra Pinto
2 stages Volta a Portugal
2005
3 stages 2005 Vuelta a España
1st overall and 1 stage Vuelta a Andalucía
1st overall Vuelta a Asturias
Prueba Villafranca de Ordizia
1st overall and 2 stages Vuelta a Castilla y León
1st overall and 1 stage Vuelta Ciclista a la Rioja
1st overall and 1 stage Euskal Bizikleta
Mountains classification Tour of the Basque Country
GP Miguel Induráin
1st overall and 1 stage GP Internacional Costa Azul
1st overall and 1 stage Vuelta a Aragón
Stage 8 Volta a Portugal
Stage 2 Vuelta Ciclista a Murcia
2006
1st overall Challenge Mallorca
1st overall and 2 stages, Volta a Portugal
Clásica a los Puertos de Guadarrama
2 stages Troféu Joaquim Agostinho
Stage 2 Vuelta a Andalucía
Stage 3 Giro del Trentino
Stage 5 Vuelta a Asturias
Trofeo Pollença
