= 1979 Grote Prijs Jef Scherens =

Race details
- Dates: 16 September 1979
- Stages: 1
- Distance: 214 km (133.0 mi)
- Winning time: 5h 15' 00"

Results
	Winner	Marcel Laurens (BEL)
	Second	Willy Teirlinck (BEL)
	Third	Frans Van Vlierberghe (BEL)

The 1979 Grote Prijs Jef Scherens was the 15th edition of the Grote Prijs Jef Scherens cycle race and was held on 16 September 1979. The race started and finished in Leuven. The race was won by Marcel Laurens.

== General classification ==
Final general classification

Rank	Rider	Time
1	Marcel Laurens (BEL)	5h 15' 00"
2	Willy Teirlinck (BEL)	+ 0"
3	Frans Van Vlierberghe (BEL)	+ 0"
4	Ludo Peeters (BEL)	+ 0"
5	Charles Jochums (BEL)	+ 0"
6	Gustaaf Van Roosbroeck (BEL)	+ 0"
7	Frank Hoste (BEL)	+ 0"
8	Benny Schepmans (BEL)	+ 0"
9	Léo Van Thielen (BEL)	+ 0"
10	Paul De Keyser (BEL)	+ 0"
