= Patrick Hosotte =

French cyclist (born 1957)

Personal information
- Born: 25 July 1957 (age 69)

Cycling career
- Sport: Cycling
- Role: Rider

Patrick Hosotte (born 25 July 1957) is a French racing cyclist. He rode in the 1981 Tour de France.
