= Patrick Moerlen =

Swiss cyclist

Personal information
- Born: 15 February 1955 (age 71) Fleurier, Switzerland

Cycling career
- Sport: Cycling
- Role: Rider

Patrick Moerlen (born 15 February 1955) is a Swiss former professional racing cyclist. He rode in three editions of the Tour de France.
