= Eric Vandeperre =

Belgian cyclist

Personal information
- Born: 25 March 1957
- Died: 30 March 2010 (aged 53)

Cycling career
- Sport: Cycling
- Role: Rider

Eric Vandeperre (25 March 1957 – 30 March 2010) was a Belgian racing cyclist. He rode in the 1981 Tour de France.
