= Claude Vincendeau =

French cyclist

Personal information
- Born: 21 December 1954 (age 71) Les Herbiers, France

Cycling career
- Sport: Cycling
- Role: Rider

Claude Vincendeau (born 21 December 1954) is a French former professional racing cyclist. He rode in four editions of the Tour de France, two editions of the Giro d'Italia and one edition of the Vuelta a España.
