= Avelino Perea =

Spanish cyclist (born 1957)

Personal information
- Born: 18 July 1957 (age 69)

Cycling career
- Sport: Cycling
- Role: Rider

Avelino Perea (born 18 July 1957) is a Spanish racing cyclist. He rode in the 1981 Tour de France.
