= Jacques Osmont =

French cyclist

Personal information
- Born: 20 March 1954 (age 72) L'Aigle, France

Cycling career
- Sport: Cycling
- Role: Rider

Amateur teams
- 1974-1976: VC Bernay
- 1977-1978: VC Roubaisien

Professional teams
- 1978-1979: Carlos
- 1980 (Jan to May): Les Amis du Tour
- 1980 (Jun to Dec): Boston–Mavic
- 1981: Wolber–Spidel

Jacques Osmont (born 20 March 1954) is a former French racing cyclist. He rode in the 1980 and 1981 Tour de France.
