= Jean-Paul Hosotte =

French cyclist

Personal information
- Born: 11 March 1955 (age 71)

Cycling career
- Sport: Cycling
- Role: Rider

Jean-Paul Hosotte (born 11 March 1955) is a French racing cyclist. He rode in the 1981 Tour de France.
