= Louis Luyten =

Belgian cyclist

Personal information
- Born: 19 May 1955 (age 71) Bree, Belgium

Cycling career
- Sport: Cycling
- Role: Rider

Louis Luyten (born 19 May 1955) is a Belgian former professional racing cyclist. He rode in four editions of the Tour de France.
