= Luc De Grauwe =

Belgian cyclist

Personal information
- Born: 22 December 1956 (age 69)

Cycling career
- Sport: Cycling
- Role: Rider

Luc De Grauwe (born 22 December 1956) is a Belgian racing cyclist. He rode in the 1981 Tour de France.
