= Marcel Laurens =

Belgian cyclist

Personal information
- Full name: Marcel Laurens
- Born: 21 June 1952 (age 74) Mechelen, Belgium

Cycling career
- Sport: Cycling
- Discipline: Road
- Role: Rider

Professional teams
- 1974–1977: IJsboerke–Colner
- 1978: C&A
- 1979–1980: Marc Zeep Savon–Superia
- 1981–1983: DAF Trucks–Côte d'Or
- 1984–1985: Euro-Soap–Crack

Marcel Laurens (born 21 June 1952) is a Belgian former racing cyclist. He finished in last place in the 1983 Tour de France.

== Major results ==
1973
3rd Kattekoers
1974
3rd Schaal Sels
1976
1st Heist-op-den-Berg
7th Grote Prijs Jef Scherens
1977
1st Ronde van Limburg
2nd Heist-op-den-Berg
1978
1st Brabantse Pijl
3rd Road race, National Road Championships
7th Kuurne-Brussels-Kuurne
1979
1st Grote Prijs Jef Scherens
2nd Heist-op-den-Berg
3rd Schaal Sels
6th Bordeaux-Paris
10th Brabantse Pijl
1980
1st Stage 3 Volta a Catalunya
1st Heist-op-den-Berg
1st GP du Tournaisis
1982
1st Heist-op-den-Berg
1983
8th GP de Fourmies
