= Wim Myngheer =

Belgian cyclist

Personal information
- Born: 23 March 1955 (age 71)

Cycling career
- Sport: Cycling
- Role: Rider

Wim Myngheer (born 23 March 1955) is a Belgian racing cyclist. He rode in the 1979 Tour de France.
