= Frans Van Vlierberghe =

Belgian cyclist (1954–2026)

- Van Vlierberghe in 1981

Personal information
- Born: 28 March 1954 Belsele, Belgium
- Died: 13 February 2026 (aged 71)

Cycling career
- Sport: Cycling
- Discipline: Road
- Role: Rider

Professional teams
- 1975: Miko–de Gribaldy
- 1976–1977: Flandria–Velda–West Vlaams Vleesbedrijf
- 1978: Carlos–Galli–Alan
- 1979–1983: Lano–Boule d'Or
- 1984: Verandalux–Dries
- 1985: Masta
- 1986–1987: Robland–La Claire Fontaine

Major wins
- Grand Tours Vuelta a España 1 individual stage (1979) One-day races and Classics Flèche Hesbignonne (1978)

Frans Van Vlierberghe (28 March 1954 – 13 February 2026) was a Belgian professional racing cyclist. He rode in two editions of the Tour de France. He also won a stage of the 1979 Vuelta a España.

Van Vlierberghe died on 13 February 2026, at the age of 71.

== Major results ==
1975
4th Grand Prix du Brabant
5th Kessel–Lier
1976
1st Stage 2a Four Days of Dunkirk
2nd Nationale Sluitingprijs
3rd GP Victor Standaert
4th De Kustpijl
9th Tour du Condroz
1977
1st Grand Prix du Brabant
1st Omloop van Midden-Brabant
3rd Le Samyn
3rd Grand Prix de Denain
3rd Flèche Halloise
10th De Kustpijl
1978
1st Flèche Hesbignonne
1979
1st Stage 12 Vuelta a España
3rd Grote Prijs Jef Scherens
4th GP de Hannut
1981
7th Omloop van de Grensstreek
1982
1st Puivelde Koerse
7th De Kustpijl
1983
1st Omloop Schelde-Durme
10th Ronde van Limburg
1984
1st GP Dr. Eugeen Roggeman
2nd Omloop Schelde-Durme
1985
1st Grote Prijs Stad Sint-Niklaas
