= Marc Renier =

Belgian cyclist

Personal information
- Born: 28 March 1953 (age 73) Roeselare, Belgium

Cycling career
- Sport: Cycling
- Role: Rider

Marc Renier (born 28 March 1953) is a former Belgian racing cyclist. He rode in the 1980 Tour de France.
