= Miguel Gutiérrez (cyclist) =

Spanish cyclist

Personal information
- Born: 3 September 1954 (age 72)

Cycling career
- Sport: Cycling
- Role: Rider

Miguel Gutiérrez (born 3 September 1954) is a Spanish racing cyclist. He rode in the 1979 Tour de France.
