= Heesselt =

- Village
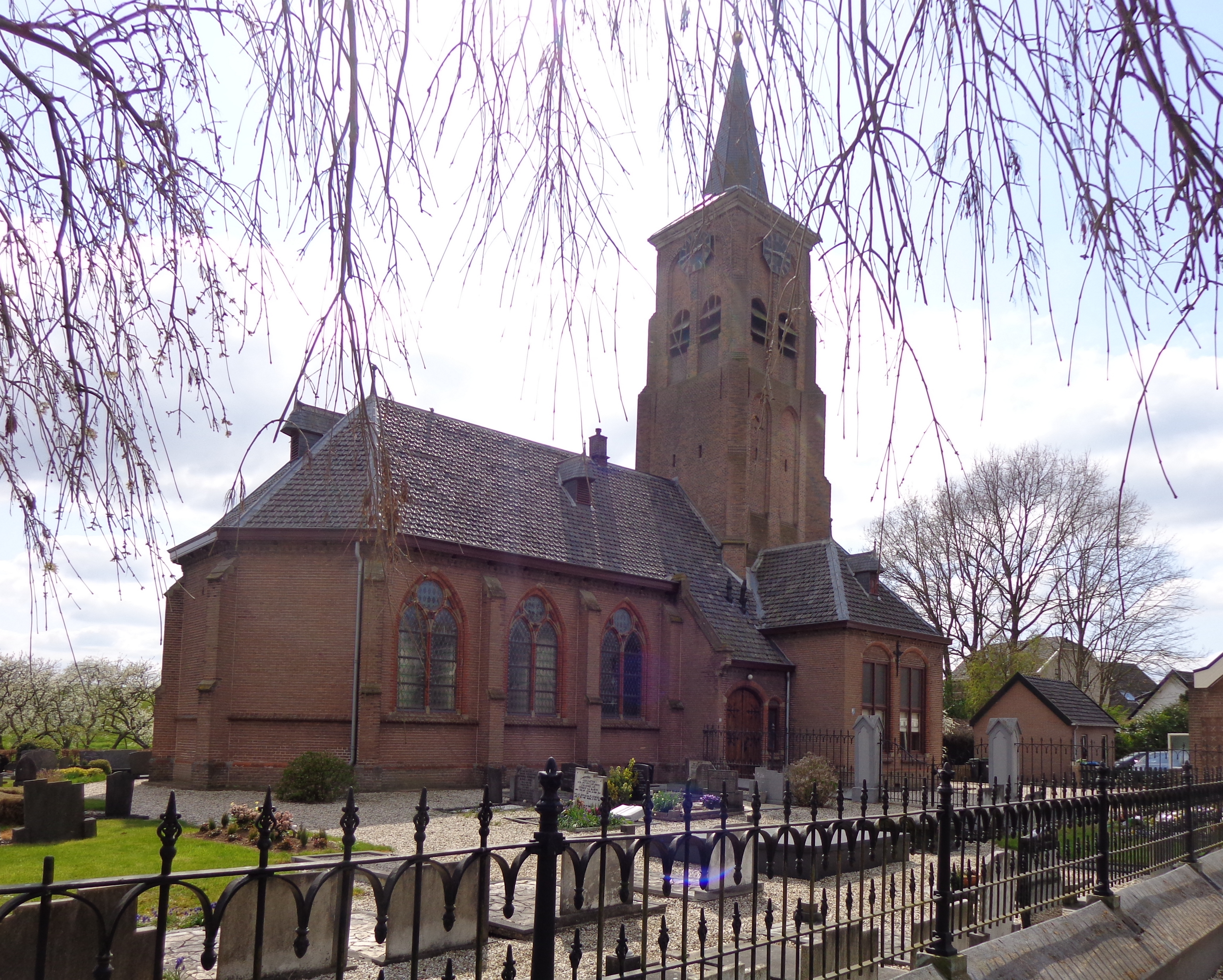
- Church of Hesselt

- Location in the Netherlands Heesselt (Netherlands)
- Coordinates: 51°48′47″N 5°20′48″E
- Country: Netherlands
- Province: Gelderland
- Municipality: West Betuwe

Area
  - Total: 6.01 km^{2} (2.32 sq mi)
- Elevation: 9 m (30 ft)

Population (2021)
  - Total: 430
  - Density: 72/km^{2} (190/sq mi)
- Time zone: UTC+1 (CET)
  - Summer (DST): UTC+2 (CEST)
- Postal code: 4063
- Dialing code: 0344

Heesselt is a village in the Dutch province of Gelderland. It is a part of the municipality of West Betuwe, and lies about 10 km southwest of Tiel.

It was first mentioned in 850 as Hesola, and probably means "forest with shrubbery". In 1840, it was home 258 people. The Dutch Reformed Church dates from 1887, but has a 15th-century tower.

== Gallery ==
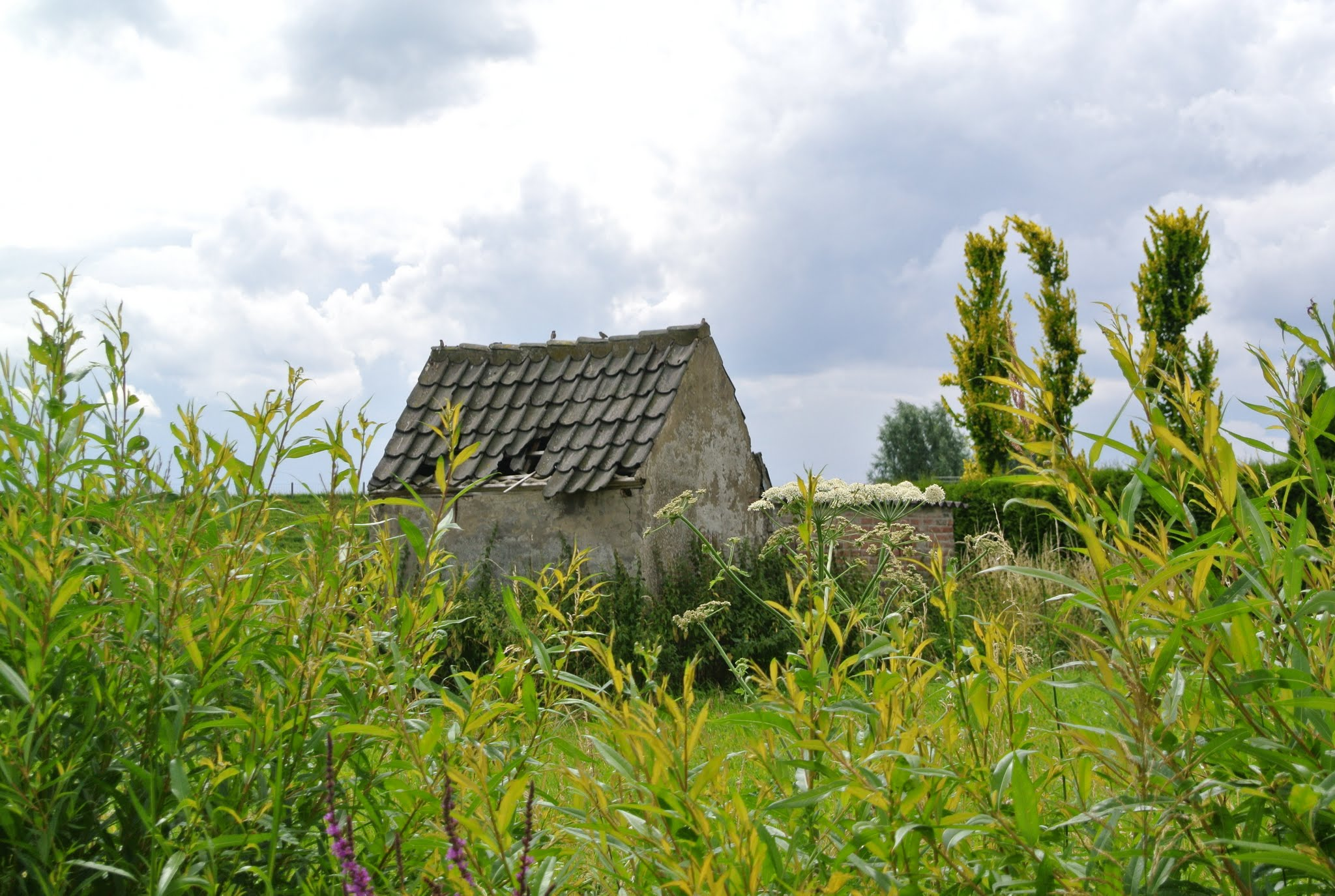
Little shed in the fields

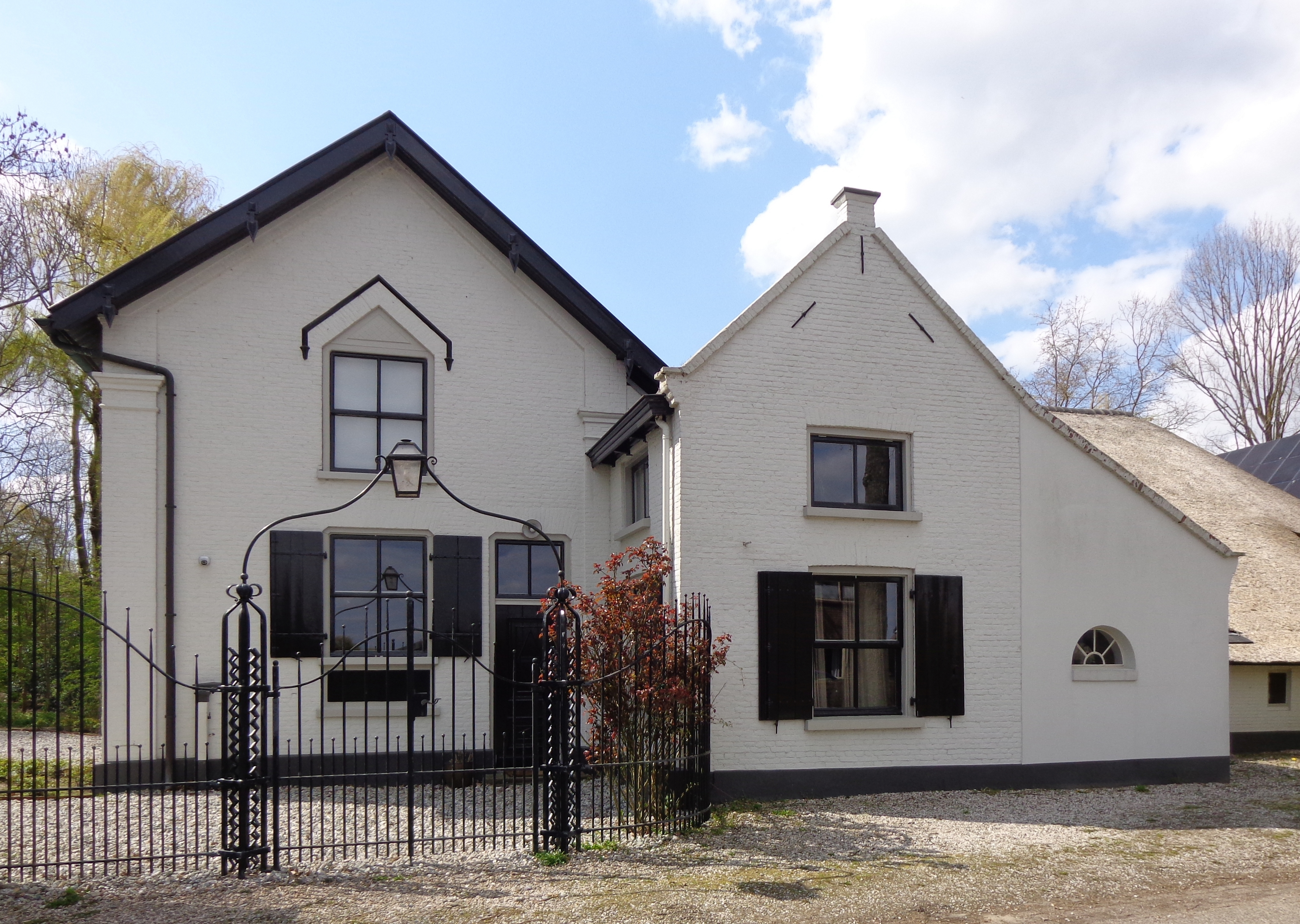
House in Heesselt

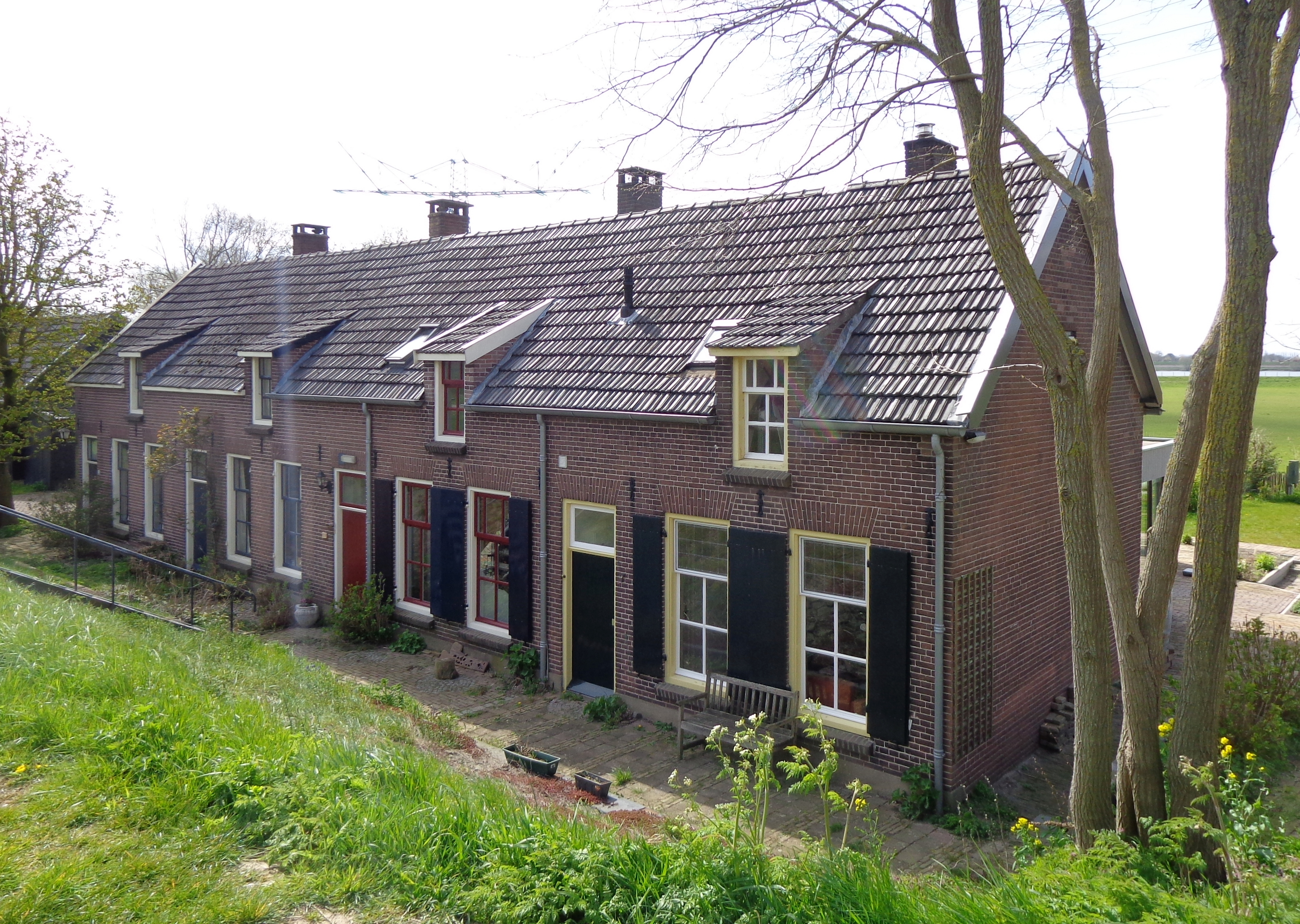
Little street in Heesselt

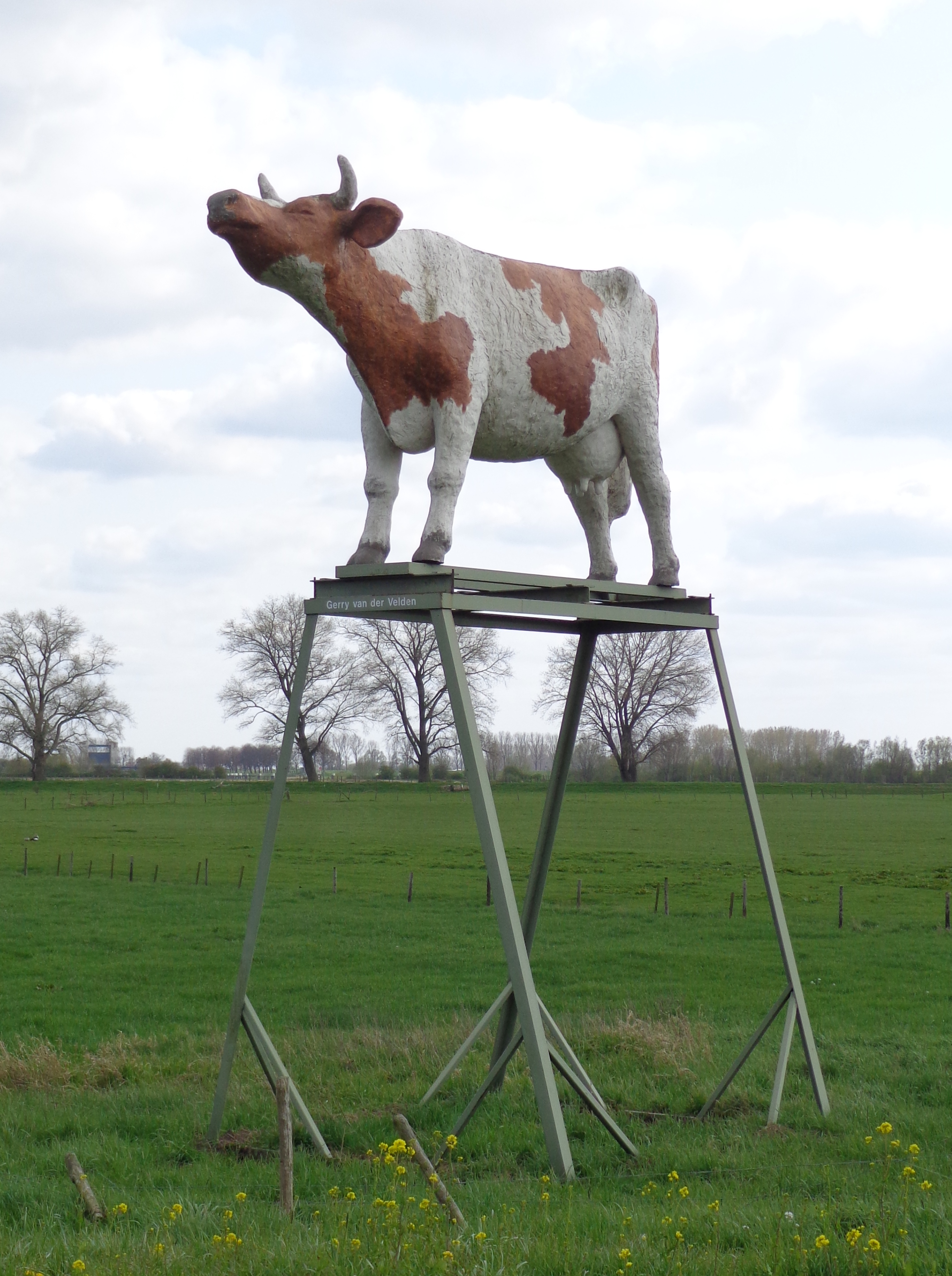
Cow statue
