= Felipe Yáñez (cyclist) =

Spanish cyclist

Personal information
- Born: 25 January 1953 (age 73) Cózar, Spain

Cycling career
- Sport: Cycling
- Discipline: Road
- Role: Rider

Professional teams
- 1977–1978: Kas–Campagnolo
- 1979: Novostil–Helios
- 1980: Kelme–Gios
- 1981–1983: Teka–Campagnolo
- 1984–1985: Orbea–Danena
- 1986: Zahor Chocolates
- 1987: Lucas–Mullers–Orbea
- 1988: Helios–Colchón CR

Major wins
- Grand Tours Vuelta a España Mountains Classification (1979, 1984) 2 individual stages (1979, 1986)

Felipe Yáñez (born 25 January 1953) is a Spanish former professional racing cyclist. He rode in two editions of the Tour de France and nine editions of the Vuelta a España.

== Major results ==
1973
1st Memorial Valenciaga
1977
1st Stage 3 Vuelta a Aragón
7th GP Villafranca de Ordizia
1978
2nd GP Llodio
3rd Overall Vuelta a Aragón

1st Stage 3

1979
1st Stage 4b Vuelta a Cantabria
3rd Overall Setmana Catalana de Ciclisme
7th Overall Vuelta a España

1st Mountains classification
1st Stage 3

7th Overall Tour of the Basque Country
1980
1st Circuito de Getxo
1st Stage 4 Tour of the Basque Country
1st Stage 2b Vuelta a Cantabria
7th Overall Volta a la Comunitat Valenciana
1981
1st Stage 5 Vuelta a Asturias
8th Clásica de San Sebastián
1982
3rd Circuito de Getxo
4th Trofeo Masferrer
1983
1st Overall Vuelta a los Valles Mineros
2nd Overall Vuelta a Burgos

1st Stage 2

5th Overall Tour of the Basque Country
1984
1st Mountains classification, Vuelta a España
3rd Klasika Primavera
9th Overall Setmana Catalana de Ciclisme

1st Stage 2

1985
1st Stage 4a Vuelta a Murcia
1st Stage 7 Vuelta a Castilla y León
9th Subida al Naranco
10th Clásica de San Sebastián
1986
1st Overall Setmana Catalana de Ciclisme

1st Stage 2

1st Stage 17 Vuelta a España
3rd Overall Vuelta a los Valles Mineros
1987
~~1st Stage 9 Vuelta a España~~
1988
1st Subida a Txitxarro
