= Jan van Houwelingen (cyclist) =

Dutch cyclist (born 1955)

Jan van Houwelingen (born 12 January 1955 in Heesselt, Gelderland) is a retired road bicycle racer from the Netherlands, who was a professional rider from 1979 to 1987. His older brother Adri (born 1953) was also a professional cyclist in the 1980s. In 1978, Van Houwelingen was a member of the team that won the team time trial at the 1978 UCI Road World Championships.

== Teams ==
- 1979: Lano - Boule d'Or (Belgium)
- 1980: Boule d'Or (Belgium)
- 1981: Boule d'Or (Belgium)
- 1982: Vermeer Thijs (Belgium)
- 1983: Boule d'Or (Belgium)
- 1984: Kwantum Hallen - Yoko (Netherlands)
- 1985: Verandalux - Dries (Belgium)
- 1986: Skala - Skil (Netherlands)
- 1987: Transvemij - Van Schilt (Netherlands)

== Tour de France ==
- 1981 – 99th
- 1983 – 80th
- 1985 – 104th
