= Julián Andiano =

Spanish cyclist

Personal information
- Born: 28 November 1951 (age 74) Rentería, Spain

Cycling career
- Sport: Cycling
- Role: Rider

Julián Andiano (born 28 November 1951) is a Spanish racing cyclist. He participated in the 1975 Tour de France.
