= Joël Gallopin =

French cyclist

Personal information
- Born: 29 January 1953 (age 73) Rambouillet, France

Cycling career
- Sport: Cycling
- Current team: Retired
- Discipline: Road
- Role: Rider

Professional teams
- 1978: Lejeune–BP
- 1979–1982: Miko–Mercier–Vivagel

Joël Gallopin (born 29 January 1953) is a French former racing cyclist. He rode in four editions of the Tour de France between 1978 and 1981.

== Major results ==
1978
10th Overall Circuit Cycliste Sarthe
1979
8th Bordeaux–Paris
1980
1st Stage 4 Tour de Corse
7th Overall Étoile de Bessèges
1981
7th GP de la Ville de Rennes
