= Christian Levavasseur =

French cyclist

Personal information
- Full name: Christian Levavasseur
- Born: 6 March 1956 (age 70) Dinan, France

Cycling career
- Sport: Cycling
- Discipline: Road
- Role: Rider

Professional teams
- 1978–1982: Miko–Mercier–Vivagel
- 1983: La Redoute–Motobécane
- 1985: UNCP

Major wins
- Combativity award 1980 Tour de France

Christian Levavasseur (born 6 March 1956 in Dinan) is a retired French cyclist, who won the combativity award in the 1980 Tour de France.

== Biography ==
Levavasseur became cadet champion of Brittany in 1973, and was professional from 1978 to 1985. After his professional career, he returned to amateur cycling in Brittany.

== Career achievements ==
=== Major results ===
1977
1st Stage 11 Tour de l'Avenir
1979
1st Stage 6 Vuelta a España
1980
1st Route Nivernaise
5th GP de la Ville de Rennes
10th Grand Prix de Mauléon-Moulins
1981
1st Grand Prix de la Cote Normande
2nd Grand Prix de Plumelec-Morbihan
2nd Overall Grand Prix du Midi Libre
1983
2nd GP de la Ville de Rennes
1984
2nd Overall Tour d'Armorique
5th GP Ouest France-Plouay
5th GP de la Ville de Rennes
1985
10th Bordeaux–Paris

=== Grand tour results ===
==== Tour de France ====
Levavasseur rode the Tour de France five times, of which he finished four times.

- 1979 : 51
- 1980 : 44 (winner of the combativity award)
- 1981 : 77
- 1982 : Did not finish (DNF)
- 1984 : 110

==== Vuelta a España ====
- 1979 : DNF
  - winner one stage (held golden jersey for 1 week)
