= Manuel Esparza =

Spanish cyclist

Personal information
- Born: 3 December 1951 (age 74) Sabadell, Spain

Cycling career
- Sport: Cycling
- Role: Rider

Manuel Esparza (born 3 December 1951) is a Spanish former racing cyclist. He competed in eleven Grand Tours races between 1974 and 1980.
