= Roger De Cnijf =

Belgian cyclist

Personal information
- Born: 14 April 1956 (age 70) Leuven, Belgium

Cycling career
- Sport: Cycling
- Current team: Retired
- Discipline: Road
- Role: Rider

Professional teams
- 1979–1980: Lano–Boule d'Or
- 1981: Boston–Mavic
- 1982: Vermeer Thijs
- 1983: Boule d'Or–Colnago
- 1984: Kwantum–Decosol–Yoko
- 1985: Lotto
- 1986: Transvemij–Van Schilt

Roger De Cnijf (born 14 April 1956) is a Belgian former professional racing cyclist. He rode in three editions of the Tour de France and one edition of the Vuelta a España. His most notable win was stage 4 of the 1979 Vuelta a España.

== Major results ==
1979
1st Stage 4 Vuelta a España
9th Overall Ronde van Nederland
1980
1st Stage 3 Deutschland Tour
1st Stage 2 Vuelta a Mallorca
8th Grote Prijs Jef Scherens
1981
2nd Druivenkoers-Overijse
8th GP Stad Zottegem
10th Amstel Gold Race
1982
4th Grote Prijs Jef Scherens
1983
8th Brabantse Pijl
