= Frits Pirard =

Dutch cyclist

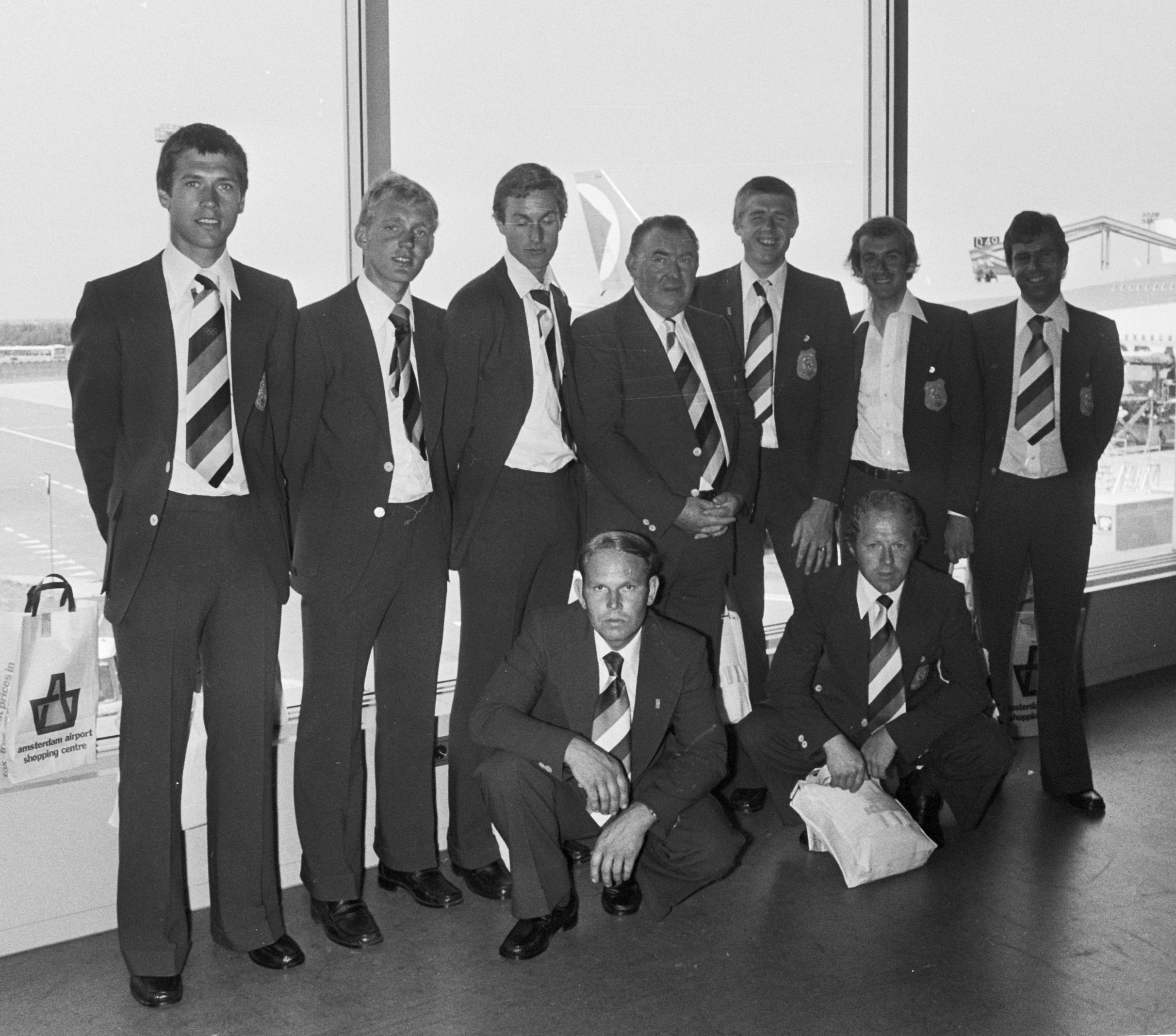

Personal information
- Full name: Frits Pirard
- Born: 8 December 1954 (age 71) Breda, the Netherlands

Cycling career
- Sport: Cycling
- Current team: Retired
- Discipline: Road
- Role: Rider

Major wins
- 1 stage 1983 Tour de France

Frits Pirard (Breda, 8 December 1954) was a Dutch professional road bicycle racer. Pirard won stage 1 of the 1983 Tour de France. He also competed in the team time trial event at the 1976 Summer Olympics.

== Major results ==
1975
Ster van Zwolle
1978
Ronde van Midden-Nederland
1979
GP Ouest-France
Netherlands National 50 km Track Championship
1982
Ulvenhout
Heusden
1983
Draai van de Kaai
Zwijndrecht
Tour de France:

Winner stage 1

Huijbergen
1985
Dongen
1986
Netherlands National Track Points Race Championship
1987
GP UC Bessèges

== See also ==
- List of Dutch Olympic cyclists
