= Patrick Friou =

French cyclist

Personal information
- Born: 8 January 1955 (age 71) Saintes, Charente-Maritime, France

Cycling career
- Sport: Cycling
- Role: Rider

Patrick Friou (born 8 January 1955) is a former French racing cyclist. He rode in four editions of the Tour de France between 1978 and 1981.
