= Adri van Houwelingen =

Dutch cyclist (born 1953)

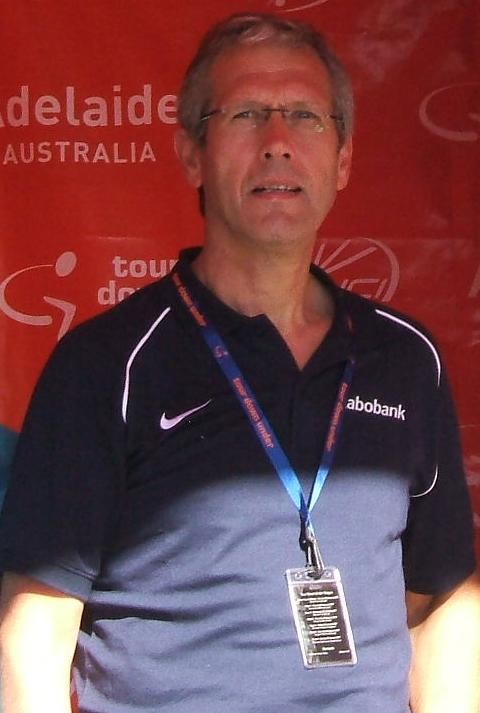

Personal information
- Full name: Adriaan van Houwelingen
- Born: 27 October 1953 (age 72) Heesselt, the Netherlands

Cycling career
- Sport: Cycling
- Discipline: Road
- Role: Rider

Professional teams
- 1978: Jet Star Jeans
- 1979: Lano - Boule d'Or
- 1980: Boule d'Or
- 1981–1982: Vermeer Thijs
- 1983: TI–Raleigh
- 1984: Kwantum Hallen - Yoko
- 1985: Verandalux - Dries
- 1986: Skala - Skil
- 1987: Roland - Skala

Major wins
- 1 stage 1982 Tour de France

Adriaan ("Adri") van Houwelingen (born 27 October 1953 in Heesselt, Gelderland) is a retired road bicycle racer from the Netherlands, who was a professional rider from 1978 to 1987. He won the 18th stage at the 1982 Tour de France and the 1983 Ronde van Nederland. He also competed in the team time trial event at the 1976 Summer Olympics.

His younger brother Jan was also a professional cyclist. He is now a directeur sportif with Team Rabobank.

== See also ==
- List of Dutch Olympic cyclists
