= Herman Beysens =

Belgian cyclist

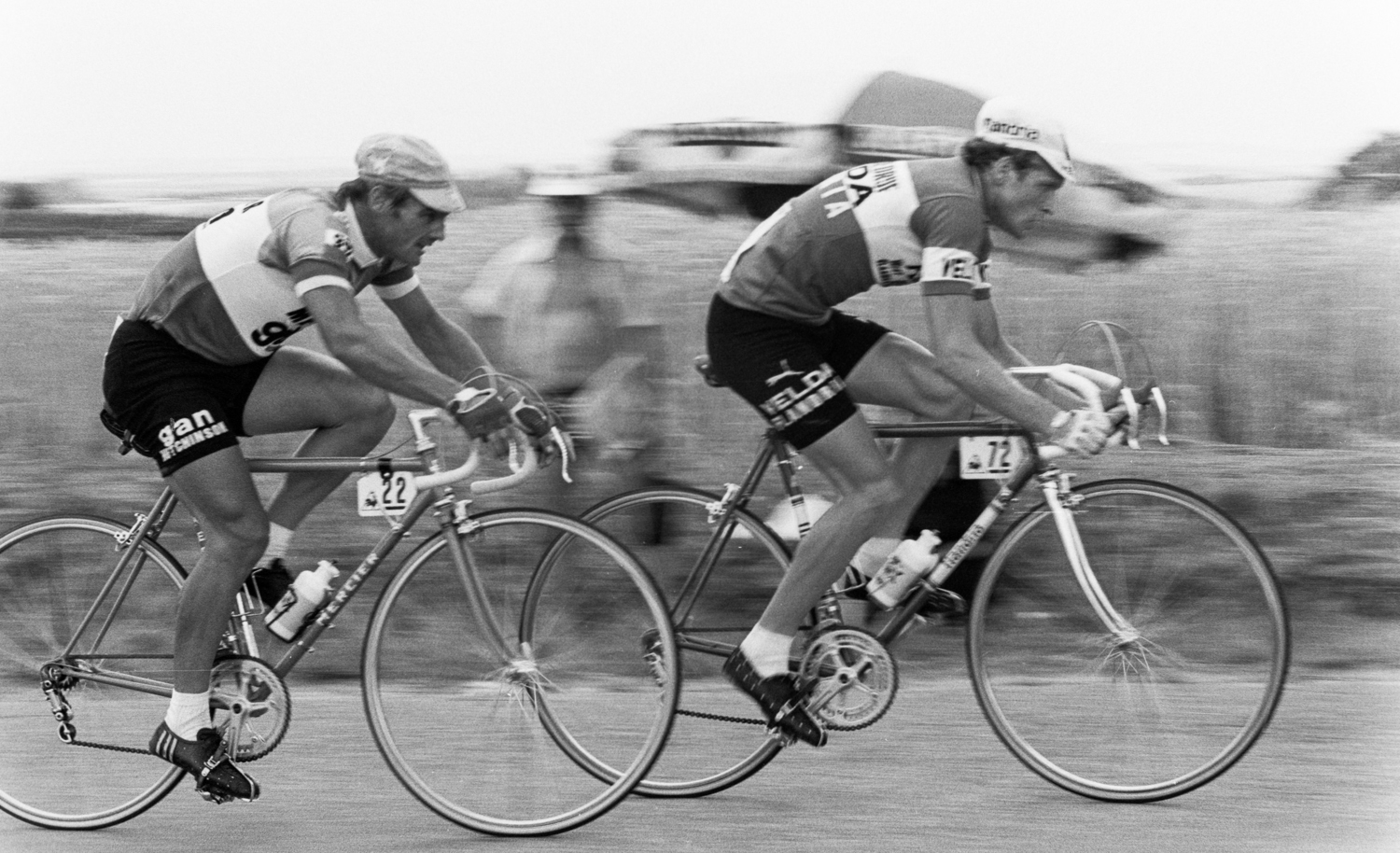
- Régis Delépine and Herman Beysens (1976)

Personal information
- Born: 27 May 1950 (age 76) Antwerp, Belgium

Cycling career
- Sport: Cycling
- Role: Rider

Herman Beysens (born 27 May 1950) is a former Belgian racing cyclist. He rode in seven editions of the Tour de France between 1972 and 1981.
