= Francisco Albelda =

Spanish cyclist

Personal information
- Full name: Francisco Ramon Albelda Tormo
- Born: 11 November 1955 (age 70) Valenciana, Spain

Cycling career
- Sport: Cycling
- Role: Rider

Francisco Ramon Albelda Tormo (born 11 October 1955) is a Spanish former professional racing cyclist. He rode in three editions of the Tour de France and one edition of the Vuelta a España.
