= 1975 Critérium du Dauphiné Libéré =

Race details
- Dates: 2–9 June 1975
- Stages: 7 + Prologue
- Distance: 1,367 km (849 mi)
- Winning time: 35h 39' 36"

Results
Jersey awarded to the overall winner	Winner	Bernard Thévenet (FRA)	(Peugeot–BP–Michelin)
	Second	Francesco Moser (ITA)	(Filotex)
	Third	Joop Zoetemelk (NED)	(Gan–Mercier–Hutchinson)
Jersey awarded to the points classification winner	Points	Freddy Maertens (BEL)	(Carpenter–Confortluxe–Flandria)
Jersey awarded to the mountains classification winner	Mountains	Lucien Van Impe (BEL)	(Gitane–Campagnolo)
	Team	Peugeot–BP–Michelin	

The 1975 Critérium du Dauphiné Libéré was the 27th edition of the cycle race and was held from 2 June to 9 June 1975. The race started in Annecy and finished in Avignon. The race was won by Bernard Thévenet of the Peugeot team.

== Teams ==
Ten teams, containing a total of 100 riders, participated in the race:

- Carpenter–Confortluxe–Flandria
- Filotex
- Gan–Mercier–Hutchinson
- Gitane–Campagnolo
- Jobo–Wolber–Sablière
- Maes Pils–Watney
- Molteni–RYC
- Peugeot–BP–Michelin
- Sporting–Sottomayor
- Super Ser

== Route ==
Stage characteristics and winners
Stage	Date	Course	Distance	Type	Winner
P	2 June	Annecy	8 km (5.0 mi)	Team time trial	Filotex
1	3 June	Annecy to Mâcon	213 km (132 mi)		Freddy Maertens (BEL)
2a	3 June	Mâcon to Le Creusot	93 km (58 mi)		Freddy Maertens (BEL)
2b	4 June	Le Creusot to Montceau-les-Mines	113 km (70 mi)		Freddy Maertens (BEL)
3	5 June	Montceau-les-Mines to Saint-Étienne	207 km (129 mi)		Freddy Maertens (BEL)
4	6 June	Saint-Étienne to Valence	149 km (93 mi)		Freddy Maertens (BEL)
5	7 June	Romans to Grenoble	216 km (134 mi)		Bernard Thévenet (FRA)
6	8 June	Grenoble to Briançon	185 km (115 mi)		Michel Pollentier (BEL)
7a	9 June	Veynes to Avignon	153 km (95 mi)		Sigfrido Fontanelli (ITA)
7b	9 June	Avignon	30 km (19 mi)	Individual time trial	Freddy Maertens (BEL)

== General classification ==
Final general classification

Rank	Rider	Team	Time
1	Bernard Thévenet (FRA)	Peugeot–BP–Michelin	35h 39' 36"
2	Francesco Moser (ITA)	Filotex	+ 4' 57"
3	Joop Zoetemelk (NED)	Gan–Mercier–Hutchinson	+ 4' 57"
4	Raymond Poulidor (FRA)	Gan–Mercier–Hutchinson	+ 5' 07"
5	Lucien Van Impe (BEL)	Gitane–Campagnolo	+ 5' 34"
6	Jean-Pierre Danguillaume (FRA)	Peugeot–BP–Michelin	+ 6' 41"
7	Raymond Delisle (FRA)	Peugeot–BP–Michelin	+ 7' 56"
8	Georges Talbourdet (FRA)	Gan–Mercier–Hutchinson	+ 10' 15"
9	André Romero (FRA)	Jobo–Wolber–Sablière	+ 10' 44"
10	Eddy Merckx (BEL)	Molteni–RYC	+ 10' 44"
