= Challenge Yellow =

Sporting competition

The Challenge Yellow, also known as Challenge Sedis, was a prize given yearly by the chain company Sedis to the best cyclists in the French races from 1931 to 1982. The winner was unofficially seen as the best cyclist in the French cycling season.

As a reaction, the Super Prestige Pernod was founded in 1958.

== List of winners ==
Year	Country	Rider	Team
1931	France	André Leducq	
1932	France	Julien Moineau	
1933	No race		
1934	France	Antonin Magne	
1935	France	René Le Grevès	
1936	France	Antonin Magne	
1937	France	Georges Speicher	
1938	France	Paul Maye	
1939–1946	No race		
1947	France	Émile Idée	
1948	France	Émile Idée	
1949	France	Jacques Moujica	
1950	France	Antonin Rolland	
1951	France	Louison Bobet	
1952	France	Louison Bobet	
1953	France	Louison Bobet	
1954	France	Louison Bobet	
1955	France	Louison Bobet	
1956	France	Bernard Gauthier	
1957	France	Jacques Anquetil	
1958	France	Raphaël Géminiani	
1959	France	Henry Anglade	
1960	France	Raymond Mastrotto	
1961	France	Raymond Poulidor	
1962	France	Joseph Groussard	
1963	France	Raymond Poulidor	
1964	France	Raymond Poulidor	
1965	France	Jacques Anquetil	
1966	France	Raymond Poulidor	
1967	France	Bernard Guyot	
1968	France	Jean Jourden	
1969	France	Raymond Poulidor	
1970	France	Lucien Aimar	
1971	France	Cyrille Guimard	
1972	France	Raymond Poulidor	
1973	France	Raymond Poulidor	
1974	France	Jean-Pierre Danguillaume	
1975	France	Bernard Thévenet	
1976	Belgium	Lucien Van Impe	
1977	Netherlands	Joop Zoetemelk	
1978	France	Bernard Hinault	
1979	France	Bernard Hinault	
1980	France	Bernard Hinault	
1981	France	Bernard Hinault	
1982	France	Bernard Hinault	
