= 1977 Critérium du Dauphiné Libéré =

Race details
- Dates: 30 May – 6 June 1977
- Stages: 7 + Prologue
- Distance: 1,402.5 km (871.5 mi)
- Winning time: 38h 31' 17"

Results
	Winner	Bernard Hinault (FRA)	(Gitane–Campagnolo)
	Second	Bernard Thévenet (FRA)	(Peugeot–Esso–Michelin)
	Third	Lucien Van Impe (BEL)	(Lejeune–BP)
	Points	Patrick Sercu (BEL)	(Fiat France)
	Mountains	Lucien Van Impe (BEL)	(Lejeune–BP)
	Team	Peugeot–Esso–Michelin	

The 1977 Critérium du Dauphiné Libéré was the 29th edition of the cycle race and was held from 30 May to 6 June 1977. The race started in Avignon and finished at Thonon-les-Bains. The race was won by Bernard Hinault of the Gitane–Campagnolo team. An all time highlight from this race was on the stage to Grenoble when Hinault miscalculated a high speed turn and went into a ravine. He left his totaled bike at the bottom, climbed back up, got on a new bike and went on to win the stage and the race by nine seconds over Bernard Thévenet. This race included five eventual Tour de France winners, all of whom finished in the top 10 including previous winners Merckx, Van Impe and Thevenet as well as future winners Hinault and Zoetemelk.

== Teams ==
Nine teams, containing a total of 89 riders, participated in the race:

- Fiat France
- Flandria–Velda–Latina Assicurazioni
- Gitane–Campagnolo
- Kas–Campagnolo
- Lejeune–BP
- Maes Pils–Mini-Flat
- Miko–Mercier–Vivagel
- Peugeot–Esso–Michelin
- Teka

== Route ==
Stage characteristics and winners
Stage	Date	Course	Distance	Type	Winner
P	30 May	Avignon	5 km (3.1 mi)	Individual time trial	Jean-Luc Vandenbroucke (BEL)
1	31 May	Orange to Saint-Étienne	228 km (142 mi)		Bernard Hinault (FRA)
2	1 June	Saint-Étienne to Montceau-les-Mines	204 km (127 mi)		Jean-Pierre Danguillaume (FRA)
3	2 June	Montceau-les-Mines to Mâcon	186 km (116 mi)		Patrick Sercu (BEL)
4a	3 June	Mâcon to Vienne	119 km (74 mi)		Patrick Sercu (BEL)
4b	3 June	Vienne to Valence	129 km (80 mi)		Patrick Sercu (BEL)
5	4 June	Romans-sur-Isère to Grenoble	214 km (133 mi)		Bernard Hinault (FRA)
6	5 June	Grenoble to Annecy	192 km (119 mi)		Lucien Van Impe (BEL)
7a	6 June	Annecy to Thonon-les-Bains	89 km (55 mi)		Patrick Sercu (BEL)
7b	6 June	Thonon-les-Bains	36.5 km (22.7 mi)	Individual time trial	Bernard Thévenet (FRA)

== General classification ==
Final general classification

Rank	Rider	Team	Time
1	Bernard Hinault (FRA)	Gitane–Campagnolo	38h 31' 17"
2	Bernard Thévenet (FRA)	Peugeot–Esso–Michelin	+ 9"
3	Lucien Van Impe (BEL)	Lejeune–BP	+ 2' 02"
4	Joaquim Agostinho (POR)	Teka	+ 3' 21"
5	Jean-Pierre Danguillaume (FRA)	Peugeot–Esso–Michelin	+ 5' 32"
6	José Nazabal (ESP)	Kas–Campagnolo	+ 6' 40"
7	Joop Zoetemelk (NED)	Miko–Mercier–Vivagel	+ 6' 51"
8	Eddy Merckx (BEL)	Fiat France	+ 8' 23"
9	Ismael Lejarreta (ESP)	Kas–Campagnolo	+ 8' 29"
10	Pedro Torres (ESP)	Teka	+ 8' 46"
