= Franco Bitossi =

Italian cyclist (born 1940)

Personal information
- Full name: Franco Bitossi
- Nickname: Cuore matto (Crazy heart)
- Born: 1 September 1940 (age 86) Camaioni di Carmignano, Italy

Cycling career
- Sport: Cycling
- Discipline: Road
- Role: Rider

Professional teams
- 1961–1962: Philco
- 1963–1972: Springoil–Fuchs
- 1973: Sammontana
- 1974–1975: Scic
- 1976: Zonca–Santini
- 1977: Vibor
- 1978: Gis Gelati

Major wins
- Grand Tours Tour de France Points classification (1968) Combination classification (1968) 4 individual stages (1966, 1968) Giro d'Italia Points classification (1969, 1970) Mountains classification (1964, 1965, 1966) 21 individual stages (1964–1971, 1974, 1975) Stage races Tour de Suisse (1965) Tirreno–Adriatico (1967) Volta a Catalunya (1970) One-day races and Classics Giro di Lombardia (1967, 1970) Milano-Torino (1968) Züri-Metzgete (1965, 1968)
Medal record
Representing Italy
Men's road bicycle racing
World Championships
Silver medal – second place	1972 Gap	Elite Men's Road Race
Bronze medal – third place	1977 San Christóbal	Elite Men's Road Race

Franco Bitossi (born 1 September 1940) is an Italian former professional cyclist. He was born in Camaioni di Carmignano.

== Career ==
Bitossi cycled for three years as an amateur and became a professional in October 1961, after he had reached the required age of 21. As a professional cyclist, from 1961 until 1978, he won a total of 171 races.

In 1965, he won the Tour de Suisse and the Züri-Metzgete, which he won again in 1968. In 1967 he won the Tirreno–Adriatico, Giro di Lombardia and Coppa Agostoni, while the following year he became the first Italian to win the points classification in the Tour de France.

In 1970, he won the Italian championship.

In 1972 he became famous for his near victory at the World Championship in Gap, France, where he was beaten by only a few meters by his teammate Marino Basso.

Four years later, in 1978, he won the Italian Championship again.

Bitossi was nicknamed Cuore matto ("Crazy heart") due to a cardiac arrhythmia which often compelled him to stop midway in a stage.

== Major results ==
1964
2nd Giro di Romagna
3rd Coppa Sabatini
10th Overall Giro d'Italia

1st Mountains classification
1st Stages 3, 16, 17 & 20

1965
1st Overall Tour de Suisse

1st Stage 2 & 5

1st Giro del Lazio
1st Züri-Metzgete
3rd Giro dell'Emilia
3rd Giro della Provincia di Reggio Calabria
4th Giro di Lombardia
6th Coppa Sabatini
7th Giro di Toscana
7th Overall Giro d'Italia

1st Mountains classification
1st Stage 21

1966
1st Coppa Sabatini
Tour de France

1st Stages 5 & 17

Tour de Romandie

1st Stages 1a (ITT), 1b & 4

2nd Giro del Piemonte
2nd Milano–Vignola
3rd Coppa Ugo Agostoni
4th Giro della Romagna
5th Tre Valli Varesine
8th Overall Giro d'Italia

1st Mountains classification
1st Stages 14 & 16

10th Overall Tirreno–Adriatico
10th Giro di Toscana
1967
1st Overall Tirreno–Adriatico

1st Stage 1

1st Giro di Lombardia
1st Trofeo Laigueglia
1st Coppa Ugo Agostoni
1st Stage 7 Giro d'Italia
2nd Milano–Torino
2nd Coppa Sabatini
2nd Giro dell'Appennino
3rd Milan–San Remo
3rd Giro dell'Emilia
7th Milano–Vignola
10th Liège–Bastogne–Liège
1968
1st Milano–Torino
1st Coppa Bernocchi
1st Giro di Toscana
1st Coppa Sabatini
1st Züri-Metzgete
1st Stage 7 Giro di Sardegna
2nd Giro di Lombardia
2nd Giro di Campania
4th Overall Tirreno–Adriatico

1st Stage 4

4th Overall Paris–Luxembourg
4th Road race, National Road Championships
4th Road race, UCI Road World Championships
5th Giro dell'Emilia
7th Milano–Vignola
8th Overall Tour de France

1st Points classification
1st Combination classification
1st Stages 7 & 16

9th Overall Giro d'Italia

1st Stages 17 & 21

1969
1st Coppa Ugo Agostoni
2nd Volta a Catalunya

1st stages 7 & 8

2nd Giro dell'Emilia
3rd Overall À travers Lausanne
3rd Giro di Lombardia
3rd Milano–Torino
3rd Trofeo Laigueglia
4th Tour of Flanders
10th Overall Giro d'Italia

1st Points classification
1st Stages 11 & 14

10th Overall Giro di Sardegna
1970
1st Road race, National Road Championships
1st Overall Volta a Catalunya

1st Stage 1a

1st Giro di Lombardia
1st Giro dell'Emilia
1st Giro del Veneto
1st Giro di Campania
1st Stage 2 Tour de Romandie
2nd Trofeo Masferrer
2nd Boucles de l'Aulne
3rd Coppa Placci
4th Overall À travers Lausanne

1st Stage 1 (ITT)

5th Overall Tirreno–Adriatico
5th Critérium des As
7th Overall Giro d'Italia

1st Points classification
1st Stages 1, 3, 17 & 19

7th Overall Tour de Suisse

1st Stages 1 & 3

7th Coppa Sabatini
9th Giro della Romagna
9th Road race, UCI Road World Championships
1971
1st Road race, National Road Championships
1st Coppa Ugo Agostoni
1st Giro della Romagna
1st GP Industria & Artigianato di Larciano
1st Stage 15 Giro d'Italia
1st Stage 3 Paris–Nice
1st Stage 1b Tour de Romandie
2nd Giro di Lombardia
5th Tre Valli Varesine
8th Overall Volta a Catalunya
9th Coppa Placci
10th Milano–Vignola
1972
1st Giro di Puglia
1st Giro della Provincia di Reggio Calabria
1st Giro di Campania
2nd Road race, UCI Road World Championships
2nd Road race, National Road Championships
2nd Milano–Torino
2nd Giro dell'Appennino
4th Giro dell'Emilia
4th Tre Valli Varesine
6th Coppa Placci
7th Overall Tour de Romandie
8th Overall Giro di Sardegna
8th Züri-Metzgete
9th Giro di Lombardia
1973
1st Giro dell'Emilia
1st Giro del Veneto
1st Stage 6 Giro di Sardegna
2nd Overall Giro di Puglia
2nd Milano–Torino
3rd Coppa Sabatini
3rd Coppa Ugo Agostoni
4th Tre Valli Varesine
4th Milano–Vignola
6th Giro della Romagna
9th Giro di Lombardia
9th Trofeo Laigueglia
1974
1st Giro della Romagna
1st Trofeo Matteotti
2nd Giro del Lazio
2nd Coppa Ugo Agostoni
2nd Giro di Toscana
3rd Coppa Sabatini
4th Milan–San Remo
5th Giro di Campania
7th Overall Tour de Suisse

1st Stages 3a, 3b (ITT), 6 & 9a

8th Overall Tirreno–Adriatico

1st Stage 4

8th Giro di Lombardia
9th Overall Giro d'Italia

1st Stages 6, 8 & 18

10th Giro del Veneto
1975
1st Stage 15 Giro d'Italia
1st Stage 3 Paris–Nice
La Méditerranéenne

1st Stages 4 & 5

2nd Overall Giro di Puglia

1st Stage 1

2nd Giro di Toscana
2nd Coppa Placci
4th Trofeo Laigueglia
8th Gran Premio Città di Camaiore
1976
1st Road race, National Road Championships
1st Coppa Bernocchi
1st Giro del Friuli
1st Trofeo Laigueglia
1st Stage 2a La Méditerranéenne
2nd Milano–Torino
2nd Giro del Lazio
2nd Giro della Provincia di Reggio Calabria
4th Coppa Placci
4th Giro di Campania
5th Giro di Toscana
8th Giro di Lombardia
8th Trofeo Pantalica
9th Overall Tirreno–Adriatico
9th Overall Giro di Sardegna
1977
1st Gran Premio Città di Camaiore
3rd Road race, UCI Road World Championships
3rd Giro di Lombardia
4th Milano–Torino
4th Coppa Ugo Agostoni
6th Overall La Méditerranéenne
6th Tre Valli Varesine
6th Gran Premio Industria e Commercio di Prato
8th Giro dell'Emilia
9th Trofeo Matteotti
10th GP Industria & Artigianato di Larciano
1978
1st Stage 2 Tirreno–Adriatico
3rd Milano–Torino
3rd Coppa Sabatini
5th Trofeo Pantalica
9th Giro della Romagna
