= 1976 Critérium du Dauphiné Libéré =

Race details
- Dates: 24–31 May 1976
- Stages: 7 + Prologue
- Distance: 1,418.4 km (881.4 mi)
- Winning time: 39h 36' 28"

Results
Jersey awarded to the overall winner	Winner	Bernard Thévenet (FRA)	(Peugeot–Esso–Michelin)
	Second	Vicente López Carril (ESP)	(Kas–Campagnolo)
	Third	Raymond Delisle (FRA)	(Peugeot–Esso–Michelin)
Jersey awarded to the points classification winner	Points	Gerard Vianen (NED)	(Gan–Mercier–Hutchinson)
Jersey awarded to the mountains classification winner	Mountains	Lucien Van Impe (BEL)	(Gitane–Campagnolo)
	Team	Peugeot–Esso–Michelin	

The 1976 Critérium du Dauphiné Libéré was the 28th edition of the cycle race and was held from 24 May to 31 May 1976. The race started in Grenoble and finished in Montélimar. The race was won by Bernard Thévenet of the Peugeot team.

== Teams ==
Nine teams, containing a total of 89 riders, participated in the race:

- Gan–Mercier–Hutchinson
- Gitane–Campagnolo
- Jobo–Spidel–Wolber–La France
- Kas–Campagnolo
- Lejeune–BP
- Maes Pils–Rokado
- Miko–de Gribaldy–Superia
- Peugeot–Esso–Michelin
- Super Ser

== Route ==
Stage characteristics and winners
Stage	Date	Course	Distance	Type	Winner
P	24 May	Grenoble	6.4 km (4.0 mi)	Team time trial	Peugeot–Esso–Michelin
1a	25 May	Grenoble to Oullins	131 km (81 mi)		Willy Planckaert (BEL)
1b	25 May	Villefranche-sur-Saône to Digoin	117 km (73 mi)		Walter Planckaert (BEL)
2	26 May	Digoin to Bourg-en-Bresse	200 km (120 mi)		Walter Planckaert (BEL)
3	27 May	Bourg-en-Bresse to Annemasse	182 km (113 mi)		Joop Zoetemelk (NED)
4	28 May	Annemasse to Chambéry	205 km (127 mi)		Bernard Thévenet (FRA)
5	29 May	Chambéry to Romans	204 km (127 mi)		Bernard Thévenet (FRA)
6a	30 May	Romans to Carpentras	145 km (90 mi)		Rachel Dard (FRA)
6b	30 May	Carpentras	27 km (17 mi)	Individual time trial	Roy Schuiten (NED)
7	31 May	Carpentras to Montélimar	201 km (125 mi)		Gerard Vianen (NED)

== General classification ==
Final general classification

Rank	Rider	Team	Time
1	Bernard Thévenet (FRA)	Peugeot–Esso–Michelin	39h 36' 28"
2	Vicente López Carril (ESP)	Kas–Campagnolo	+ 1' 05"
3	Raymond Delisle (FRA)	Peugeot–Esso–Michelin	+ 2' 03"
4	Josef Fuchs (SUI)	Super Ser	+ 3' 09"
5	Lucien Van Impe (BEL)	Gitane–Campagnolo	+ 3' 19"
6	Jean-Pierre Danguillaume (FRA)	Peugeot–Esso–Michelin	+ 5' 09"
7	Bernard Vallet (FRA)	Gan–Mercier–Hutchinson	+ 5' 59"
8	Joop Zoetemelk (NED)	Gan–Mercier–Hutchinson	+ 6' 45"
9	Ferdinand Julien (FRA)	Lejeune–BP	+ 7' 55"
10	José Pesarrodona (ESP)	Kas–Campagnolo	+ 8' 04"
