= Combination classification in the Tour de France =

Combination jersey
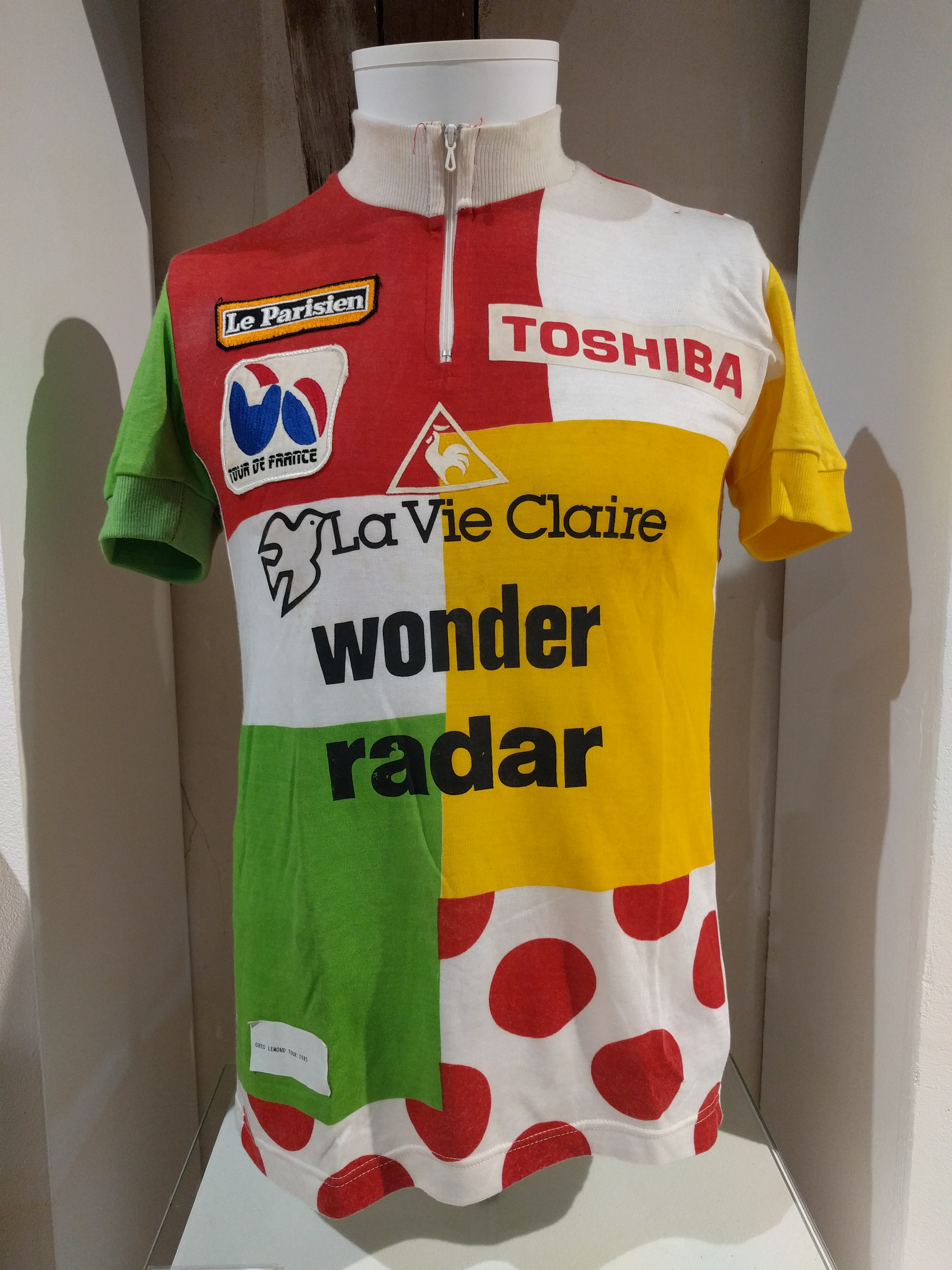
- The 1985 combination jersey, worn by Greg LeMond
- Sport: Road bicycle racing
- Competition: Tour de France
- Awarded for: Best combination leader
- Local name: Maillot du combiné (French)

History
- First award: 1968
- Editions: 15
- Final award: 1989
- First winner: Franco Bitossi (ITA)
- Most wins: Eddy Merckx (BEL) 5 times
- Most recent: Steven Rooks (NED)

The combination jersey (also known as the multi-coloured jersey or technicolour jersey) was the jersey in the Tour de France worn by the leader of the combination classification.

== History ==
In 1968 the combination classification was introduced in the Tour de France. From 1969 on, the leader was recognized by a white jersey. The jersey was awarded to the cyclists that did best in all other classifications: General, Points and Mountains. It was seen as the classification for the all-round cyclist. Only cyclists ranking in each of the three other classifications were ranked in the Combination classification. Ranking was established by adding the cyclists' ranks in the three other classifications: 1 point for rank 1, 2 points for rank 2 and so on. Cyclists being at level on ranks for one of the other classifications were added the average of the corresponding points (e.g. 2 cyclists being level at rank 3 where counting (3+4)/2 = 3.5 points). Finally, the lower the sum the better the combination classification ranking.

From 1975 on, the combination classification temporarily disappeared, and the white jersey was given to the leader of the young rider classification.

In 1980, the combination classification was reintroduced, sponsored by French television station TF1, therefore officially named "Grand Prix TF1". This lasted until 1984, when the combination classification disappeared again. In 1985, the combination classification was again reintroduced, and this time the multicoloured jersey was used. After the 1989 Tour, the combination classification was discontinued, as the new director Jean-Marie Leblanc wanted to modernise the Tour. Since then, the Tour has awarded only the yellow, green and polka dot jerseys, adding again the white jersey since 2000 edition.

== Combination classification results ==
Combination classification podiums by year
Year	First place		Second place		Third place		Ref
Year	Rider	Points	Rider	Points	Rider	Points	Ref
1968	Franco Bitossi (ITA)	11	Jan Janssen (NED)	18.5	Roger Pingeon (FRA)	20	
1969	Eddy Merckx (BEL)	3	Roger Pingeon (FRA)	8	Felice Gimondi (ITA)	15	
1970	Eddy Merckx (BEL)	4	Martin Van Den Bossche (BEL)	21.5	Marinus Wagtmans (NED)	23	
1971	Eddy Merckx (BEL)	5	Joop Zoetemelk (NED)	9	Lucien Van Impe (BEL)	13	
1972	Eddy Merckx (BEL)	4	Raymond Poulidor (FRA)	13	Joop Zoetemelk (NED)	13	
1973	Joop Zoetemelk (NED)	20	Lucien Van Impe (BEL)	26	Bernard Thévenet (FRA)	33	
1974	Eddy Merckx (BEL)	8	Michel Pollentier (BEL)	31	Raymond Poulidor (FRA)	36	
Competition not contested between 1975 and 1979
1980	Ludo Peeters (BEL)	317	Raymond Martin (FRA)	263	Joop Zoetemelk (NED)	218	
1981	Bernard Hinault (FRA)	6	Lucien Van Impe (BEL)	20	Jean-René Bernaudeau (FRA)	21	
1982	Bernard Hinault (FRA)	11	Sean Kelly (IRE)	5	Bernard Vallet (FRA)	5	
1983	Laurent Fignon (FRA)	8	Lucien Van Impe (BEL)	7	Sean Kelly (IRE)	5	
1984	Laurent Fignon (FRA)	No standings available					
1985	Greg LeMond (USA)	91	Sean Kelly (IRL)	85	Bernard Hinault (FRA)	76	
1986	Greg LeMond (USA)	87	Bernard Hinault (FRA)	87	Claude Criquielion (BEL)	68	
1987	Jean-François Bernard (FRA)	72	Laurent Fignon (FRA)	70	Stephen Roche (IRL)	69	
1988	Steven Rooks (NED)	84	Gert-Jan Theunisse (NED)	70	Pedro Delgado (ESP)	63	
1989	Steven Rooks (NED)	89	Laurent Fignon (FRA)	84	Sean Kelly (IRL)	82	
