= 1974 Paris–Nice =

Race details
- Dates: 9–16 March 1974
- Stages: 7 + Prologue
- Distance: 1,236.5 km (768.3 mi)
- Winning time: 33h 16' 55"

Results
Jersey awarded to the overall winner	Winner	Joop Zoetemelk (NED)	(Gan–Mercier–Hutchinson)
	Second	Alain Santy (FRA)	(Gan–Mercier–Hutchinson)
	Third	Eddy Merckx (BEL)	(Molteni)
Jersey awarded to the points classification winner	Points	Rik Van Linden (BEL)	(IJsboerke–Colner)

The 1974 Paris–Nice was the 32nd edition of the Paris–Nice cycle race and was held from 9 March to 16 March 1974. The race started in Paris and finished in Nice. The race was won by Joop Zoetemelk of the Gan team.

== General classification ==
Final general classification

Rank	Rider	Team	Time
1	Joop Zoetemelk (NED)	Gan–Mercier–Hutchinson	33h 16' 55"
2	Alain Santy (FRA)	Gan–Mercier–Hutchinson	+ 29"
3	Eddy Merckx (BEL)	Molteni	+ 1' 01"
4	Bernard Thévenet (FRA)	Peugeot–BP–Michelin	+ 1' 26"
5	Raymond Poulidor (FRA)	Gan–Mercier–Hutchinson	+ 1' 33"
6	Mariano Martinez (FRA)	Sonolor–Gitane	+ 2' 11"
7	Hennie Kuiper (NED)	Rokado	+ 2' 25"
8	Leif Mortensen (DEN)	Bic	+ 3' 08"
9	Miguel María Lasa (ESP)	Kas–Kaskol	+ 3' 29"
10	Rik Van Linden (BEL)	IJsboerke–Colner	+ 3' 34"
