= Joop Zoetemelk =

Dutch cyclist

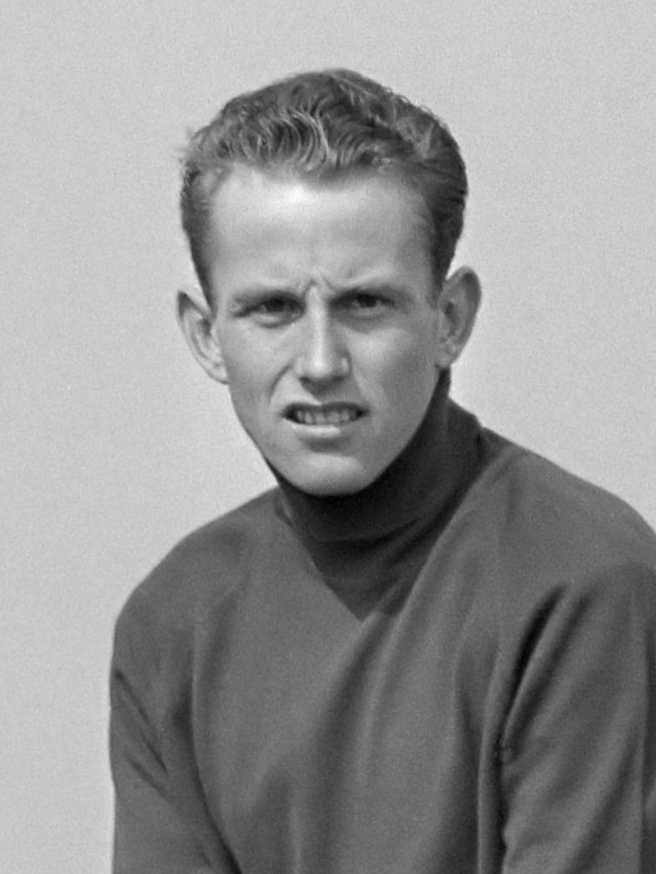
- Zoetemelk in 1971

Personal information
- Full name: Gerardus Joseph Zoetemelk
- Born: 3 December 1946 (age 79) The Hague, Netherlands
- Height: 1.73 m (5 ft 8 in)
- Weight: 68 kg (150 lb; 10 st 10 lb)

Cycling career
- Sport: Cycling
- Discipline: Road
- Role: Rider
- Rider type: All-round

Professional teams
- 1970–1972: Flandria–Mars
- 1973–1974: Gitane–Frigécrème
- 1975–1979: Gan–Mercier–Hutchinson
- 1980–1981: TI–Raleigh–Creda
- 1982–1983: COOP–Mercier–Mavic
- 1984–1987: Kwantum–Decosol–Yoko

Major wins
- Grand Tours Tour de France General classification (1980) Combination classification (1973) 10 individual stages (1973, 1975, 1976, 1978, 1979, 1980) 5 TTT stages (1980, 1981, 1983) Vuelta a España General classification (1979) Mountains classification (1971) 3 individual stages (1971, 1979) Stage Races Paris–Nice (1974, 1975, 1979) Tour de Romandie (1974) Critérium International (1979) Tirreno–Adriatico (1985) One-day races and Classics World Road Race Championships (1985) National Road Race Championships (1971, 1973) Amstel Gold Race (1987) La Flèche Wallonne (1976) Paris–Tours (1977, 1979)
Medal record
Representing Netherlands
Men's road bicycle racing
Olympic Games
Gold medal – first place	1968 Mexico City	Team time trial
World Championships
Gold medal – first place	1985 Giavera di Montello	Men's road race

Gerardus Joseph "Joop" Zoetemelk (pronounced [joːp ˈsutəmɛl(ə)k]; (Note: Zoetemelk in isolation: [ˈzutəmɛl(ə)k].) born 3 December 1946) is a Dutch former professional racing cyclist. He started and finished the Tour de France 16 times, which were both records when he retired. He also holds the distance record in Tour de France history with 62,885 km ridden. He won the 1979 Vuelta a España and the 1980 Tour de France.

Besides winning the Tour de France he also finished the Tour in 8th, 5th, 4th (three times) and 2nd (six times) place for a total of eleven top 5 finishes which is a record. He was the first rider to wear the Tour de France's polka dot jersey as the King of the Mountains and even though he never won this classification in the Tour de France, he did win it in the 1971 Vuelta a España and was considered one of the best climbers of his generation.

If not for a ten minute time penalty for a doping infraction in 1977, he would have finished in the top 5 in each of the first 12 Tours he entered.

He won the World Professional Road Championship in 1985 at the age of 38, with a late attack surprising the favorites of LeMond, Roche, Argentin and Millar. He completed a total of 16 World Championships which is notable considering more than half the field abandons nearly every World Championship and in addition to his win he has come in the top 10 seven other times. As of 2024, he is the oldest men's individual road race world champion.

His record number of starts in the Tour de France was surpassed when George Hincapie started for the 17th time, but Hincapie was disqualified from three tours in October 2012, for doping offenses, giving the number of starts record back to Zoetemelk. Nobody other than Zoetemelk achieved sixteen Tour de France finishes until Sylvain Chavanel did so in the 2018 Tour de France. Currently, three riders have had more than 16 starts in the Tour de France, but no one has yet exceeded the record of finishing the event 16 times. He retired from the sport to run a hotel at Meaux, France.

== Early life and career ==
Zoetemelk was raised in Rijpwetering, the son of Maria and Gerard Zoetemelk. He started working as a carpenter. He became a speed-skater and a regional champion before turning to cycling in 1964. He joined the Swift club in Leiden and made a fast impression, winning youth races in his first season. He rode particularly well as a senior in multi-day races. He won the Tour of Yugoslavia, the Circuit des Mines, three stages and the mountains prize in the Tour of Austria, and the 1969 Tour de l'Avenir. He also won a gold medal at the 1968 Summer Olympics in Mexico City in the 100 km team time-trial with Fedor den Hertog, Jan Krekels and René Pijnen.

== Professional career ==
Zoetemelk turned professional for Briek Schotte's Belgian Mars–Flandria team in 1970. Initially he was riding in support of team leader Roger De Vlaeminck, but the Belgian abandoned the race due to a crash near the end of the first week. Zoetemelk proved to be by far the strongest remaining rider on the team. Of his teammates who finished the race the highest placed was 69th, with the majority of others coming in the range of 80th to 100th place. While he admitted that Eddy Merckx was the strongest rider in the world in that year's Tour de France, and was not challenging him for victory, he managed to finish on the podium in 2nd place and was the only rider to finish within 15:00 of Merckx during his first two Tour victories in 1969 and 1970.

He wore the yellow jersey for the first time in the 1971 Tour de France, following a stage in which he, Luis Ocaña and Bernard Thévenet were able to drop Merckx for the first time. On stage 10 however, Ocaña stole the show in one of the most memorable attacks in Tour history taking the jersey from Zoetemelk and distancing all of the other favorites. On stage 14 Ocaña and Zoetemelk were involved in one of the most famous crashes in Tour history on the Col de Menté. Zoetemelk managed to survive the impact but Ocaña was seriously injured and had to be taken to the hospital. From that point on Merckx led the race, and Zoetemelk finished 2nd for the second consecutive year.

He wore the yellow jersey for the second time after winning the Prologue in the 1973 Tour de France, which took place in his home country of the Netherlands. He also picked up another stage win in that year's edition.

Zoetemelk won Paris–Nice, the Semana Catalana and the Tour de Romandie in 1974. He then had a near-death experience during a violent crash, once again involving Luis Ocaña, except this time Zoetemelk had to be taken to the hospital as he crashed heavily into a car left unattended at the finish of the Midi Libre in Valras-Plage, France. He cracked his skull and came close to dying.

He returned the next season to win Paris–Nice again, and then caught meningitis. He never fully recovered and the head injury reduced his sense of taste. Nevertheless, he won 20 races that season, including Paris–Nice, the Tour of Holland and the Dwars door Lausanne and a stage of the Tour de France. He also came fourth in the 1975 Tour de France. During that year's Tour he won stage 15 and finished strongly overall, placing behind only Thévenet, Merckx and Lucien Van Impe in a Tour where the next closest contenders were close to 20:00 or more behind the winner.

In the 1976 Tour de France he won stage 9 up Alpe d'Huez by :03 in a hard-fought climb where he and Van Impe dropped all other riders and were alone crossing the finish. In stage 10 Zoetemelk once again won the stage, this time beating Van Impe and Thévenet by just one second, in the process coming within just seven seconds of the Yellow Jersey. On stage 14 however, Van Impe attacked and for all intents and purposes won the tour. Zoetemelk won again on Stage 20 but he remained more than 4:00 behind Van Impe as every other rider was more than 12:00 back.

In the 1977 Tour de France he had the worst Tour placing of his career up to that point, which was partially because he was penalized ten minutes and had a stage win revoked. He still finished in the Top 10 overall.

During the 1978 Tour de France he won stage 14, and going into the stage on Alpe d'Huez Zoetemelk, Michel Pollentier and Tour debutant Bernard Hinault were separated from one another by only 0:18. At the end of the stage he led Hinault by +0:14 but was 2nd in the overall classification to Pollentier; however due to the Pollentier doping incident following the post-stage drug test, he took over the yellow jersey. He rode strongly and kept his narrow lead, which he held for several stages before losing it to Hinault on the final time trial.

In 1979 he rode the Vuelta a España for the second time in his career. He previously rode the 1971 edition where he placed 6th overall and won the King of the Mountains competition. He won the 1979 edition.

In the 1979 Tour de France he survived the "hell of the north" cobbles of Roubaix on Stage 9, which is a notorious stage where several riders can get multiple flat tires and there are always many crashes. Zoetemelk survived with four other riders in the winning group, won 3:45 over the next finishers and moved into the yellow jersey, which he held for 6 stages. Following the stage 11 time trial it was a two-way battle between him and Hinault and it was possible that he won the Vuelta-Tour Double.

Hinault steadily chipped away at Zoetemelk's lead and then steadily built his lead over Zoetemelk while all other GC contenders were distanced further and further. Zoetemelk was able to drop Hinault on Alpe d'Huez and claim the stage win. He was able to take back just under a minute, but he needed to win by +3:00.

In the end Hinault kept the lead and he and Zoetemelk finished nearly a half hour ahead of the rest of the field as Zoetemelk refused to give up and attacked on the final stage into Paris. It was not enough to break Hinault however as he took 2nd place on the podium for the 5th time.

The following year he was riding with a new team in TI–Raleigh, who was one of the strongest cycling teams in the world and they grew even stronger after signing Zoetemelk. At one point in this Tour TI–Raleigh won seven stages in a row, one of which was an ITT won by Zoetemelk where he gained 1:39 on Hinault and pulled within 0:21 of the overall lead prior to the first stages in the high mountains. Hinault withdrew and Zoetemelk remained the strongest rider in the Tour despite suffering a violent crash on Stage 16 which cut his arm and leg open. He also claimed another stage win during the final ITT winning the 1980 Tour de France by nearly 7:00 over Hennie Kuiper and Raymond Martin.

In 1981 he finished 4th overall, and he finished 2nd for the 6th and final time during the 1982 Tour de France. While he was in his late 30s during his final Tours between 1982 and 1986 and was no longer a pre-race favorite he still remained the strongest GC general classification rider on his team and always had a respectable placing in the overall standings. Including in his final Tour, which he rode wearing the rainbow jersey as reigning World Champion and late in his career he was still good enough to win major races including the 1985 World Championship, Tirreno–Adriatico and the Amstel Gold Race.

Going into the 1985 World Championship the primary favorites were thought to include Bernard Hinault, Greg LeMond and being as it was thought the course could produce a sprint finish riders like Sean Kelly or even defending world champion Claude Criquielion. There were several early breakaways, but none of them included any riders considered threats to stay away and never extended their gap much beyond two minutes. There were two major crashes, both of which Zoetemelk managed to avoid but the second crash on lap 12 (of 18) allowed a breakaway to form with five riders including Jens Veggerby, Dominique Arnaud and Johan van der Velde. This group built up a gap of over two minutes before the surviving peloton began reeling them back in. Hinault had an off day, suffered a flat tire and abandoned the race, as did several other strong riders including Hennie Kuiper, Dietrich Thurau and Urs Freuler. By lap 17 the race had come back together and riders such as Moreno Argentin, Australian Michael Wilson and Criquielion had launched attacks but before long they had been brought back. By the final lap Zoetemelk had been all but invisible within the pack no different than many other riders, but he was still in the race as riders like Stephen Roche of Ireland and Kim Andersen of Denmark launched attacks that were eventually brought back. Following the final climb there were less than 20 riders still in contention, but it was a very strong surviving group that was going to come down to a sprint finish with riders including former champs LeMond and Criquielion, as well as Andersen, Roche, Robert Millar, Marc Madiot, Italian riders Argentin and Claudio Corti, who finished 2nd the previous year, as well as three Dutch riders in Zoetemelk, Van der Velde and Gerard Veldscholten. Knowing he would not win a sprint against the youngest, strongest riders in the world he launched an attack with over a kilometer to go. Going into the second to last turn Zoetemelk got to the front of the group, moved all the way to the outside of the road then swept back along the inside charging forward into the straightaway. Perhaps, as he was by far the oldest rider in the group and considered long past his prime, his attack caught the surviving contenders by surprise and he quickly opened a gap of fifty meters. His teammates in Van der Velde and Veldscholten moved to the front of the group, but were not actually chasing Zoetemelk down and therefore slowed the chase group. As he went under the flamme rouge banner he had a gap of over 300 meters and was continuing to pull away from the best riders in the world. With 400 meters to go in the race he had a gap of 500 meters and Argentin was at the front of the pack trying to bring back Zoetemelk's attack but couldn't, so he actually put his arm in the air and waved for someone else to come forward and help. No one did, including LeMond who stated after the race that he just wasn't strong enough to bring back this final attack after chasing down the attacks of other riders all day long. As the finish line approached he looked over his shoulder one final time and began celebrating. He crossed the line with his hands in the air and as his teammates Van der Velde and Veldscholten crossed the line in 9th and 14th place, they too threw their hands in the air in celebration. As of 2020 Zoetemelk is still the oldest world champion in the history of this event and of the other top 10 finishers in the 1985 race all of them were between 24 and 28 years old.

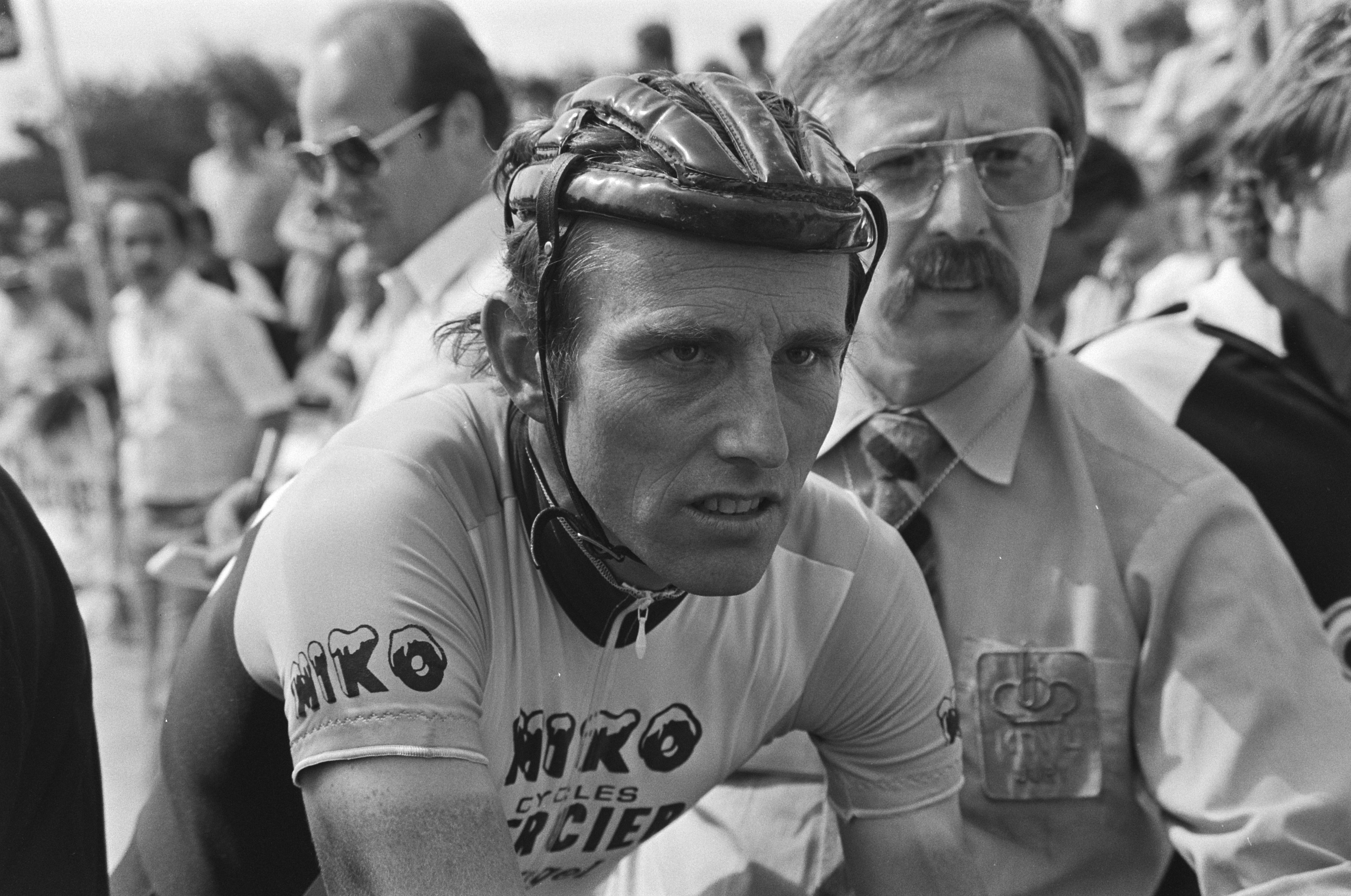
Zoetemelk in 1979

Regarding his victory in the 1980 Tour de France, Peter Post, directeur sportif of the TI–Raleigh team in the Netherlands, approached Zoetemelk through his wife, Françoise, after the world championship in 1979. Zoetemelk had long lived in France and ridden for French teams. His sponsor, the bicycle company Mercier, had ended its sponsorship and Zoetemelk was looking for a new team. The following year Zoetemelk won his – and TI–Raleigh's – only Tour de France. The pre-race favourite, Bernard Hinault had retired halfway due to knee-problems. Zoetemelk objected to claims that he had won only because Hinault had dropped out, saying: "Surely winning the Tour de France is a question of health and robustness. If Hinault doesn't have that health and robustness and I have, that makes me a valid winner."

Gerald O'Donovan, the TI–Raleigh director behind sponsorship of the team, said:

"We needed a winner and for 1980 signed Joop Zoetemelk, who had an outstanding record of places but had probably enjoyed less support than we could give him. We cleaned up the Tours of Belgium, Holland and Critérium du Dauphiné Libéré in preparation and waited for the big day. The big plan to control Bernard Hinault, who had won for the previous two years, came to fruition. The team attacked his every move; this was Panzer Group Post at its most formidable. About halfway through the race he abandoned the lead to Zoetemelk and pulled out of the race. We arrived in Paris with the overall lead, 12 stage wins and the team prize, to say nothing of a whole bundle of francs. We had pounded away winning the battles for the previous four years; at last we had won the war."

Of one-day races he won La Flèche Wallonne in 1976, and the Grand Prix d'Automne in 1977 and 1979. He came in fourth in the World Championships of 1976 & 1982, and placed in the top 10 in 1972, 1973, 1975, 1978 and 1984 before winning in 1985. Of the major week long stage races he won Tirreno–Adriatico, the Tour de Romandie and three editions of Paris–Nice. While he was never victorious in the Critérium du Dauphiné Libéré, he did place in the top 10 on eight occasions.

In 18 years as a professional (1969–1987), Zoetemelk had a remarkable record of consistency. In grand tours and major stage races he entered 57 races, completing 55 of them, or 96.5% of them. Of these 55 completed races he finished inside the top 10 thirty-eight times, made the podium twenty-one times and claimed seven victories. He only finished outside the top 25 on four occasions.

He entered the Tour de France sixteen times and finished the race sixteen times, the latter of which is a record that Sylvain Chavanel tied when he finished the 2018 Tour de France. He holds the record for total kilometers ridden, a record that will be very difficult to break as modern stages are considerably shorter than they were during Zoetemelk's era. Another record he held was for the most stages completed in TDF history with 365, a record that was not broken until 2018 by Chavanel.

== Doping ==
During the 1977 Tour de France he won the mountain time trial on stage 15B, several days later it was revealed he took a banned substance and had the stage win revoked and was penalized ten minutes.

In the 1979 Tour de France Zoetemelk tried attacking Hinault on the final stage of the race into Paris. Hinault and Zoetemelk stayed away for the entire stage and Zoetemelk was given a ten-minute doping penalty after the race was over.

During the 1983 Tour de France he was given a doping penalty. At his stage of his career, he was no longer a favorite for victory and was not taking substances for "performance enhancement", but just to "survive" the race. Much later it was revealed by riders from this era they would often take substances just to finish the race.

He was not implicated during his Tour win in 1980.

== Assessment ==
Zoetemelk is one of the most successful Tour riders of all time; he finished second a record six times and won once. His career coincided with the rise and fall of both Eddy Merckx and Bernard Hinault, riders considered by many to be the #1 and #2 in all of Tour de France history. While Merckx was rivaled by Luis Ocaña and Hinault by Laurent Fignon and Greg LeMond, by the end of most of their Tour victories it was Zoetemelk who proved to be the only rider in the entire field capable of keeping either one of them within striking distance. Specifically in Merckx's 1969 and 1970 Tour wins nobody was able to keep him within fifteen minutes in 1969 and in 1970 Zoetemelk was the only rider to do so. He also finished 2nd to Merckx in 1971 following Ocana's infamous crash on the Col de Menté, a crash in which Zoetemelk was involved but somehow managed to avoid injury. In fact, early in the 1971 Tour de France Zoetemelk wore the Yellow Jersey for the first time becoming the first GC contender to take the Yellow from Merckx. Then in the 1979 Hinault victory nearly the entire field finished a half hour or more behind him, but Zoetemelk was able to keep him within about three minutes to finish in second place, becoming the only rider in Tour history to challenge the yellow jersey on the final stage into Paris in the process. Zoetemelk finished second to Hinault in 1978 and 1979, before outlasting and defeating him in 1980, and again during his sixth and final second-place finish in 1982.

During his remarkable career Zoetemelk spent 22 days in the Yellow Jersey and won 10 individual stages in the Tour de France, was the overall winner of the Vuelta a España in 1979, the King of the Mountains in 1971, and won the 1985 UCI Road World Championships.

A fellow Tour rider, Rini Wagtmans, said: "Joop Zoetemelk is the best rider that the Netherlands has ever known. There has never been a better one. But he could not give instructions. He was treated and helped with respect. But when Zoetemelk won the Tour, the instructions had to come from Gerrie Knetemann and Jan Raas."

Peter Post said: "Joop would fit in any team. I've known only a few riders who were so easy. He followed the rules, he got on with people. That's the way he is. He never asked for domestiques. Joop never demanded anything."

== Personal life and retirement ==
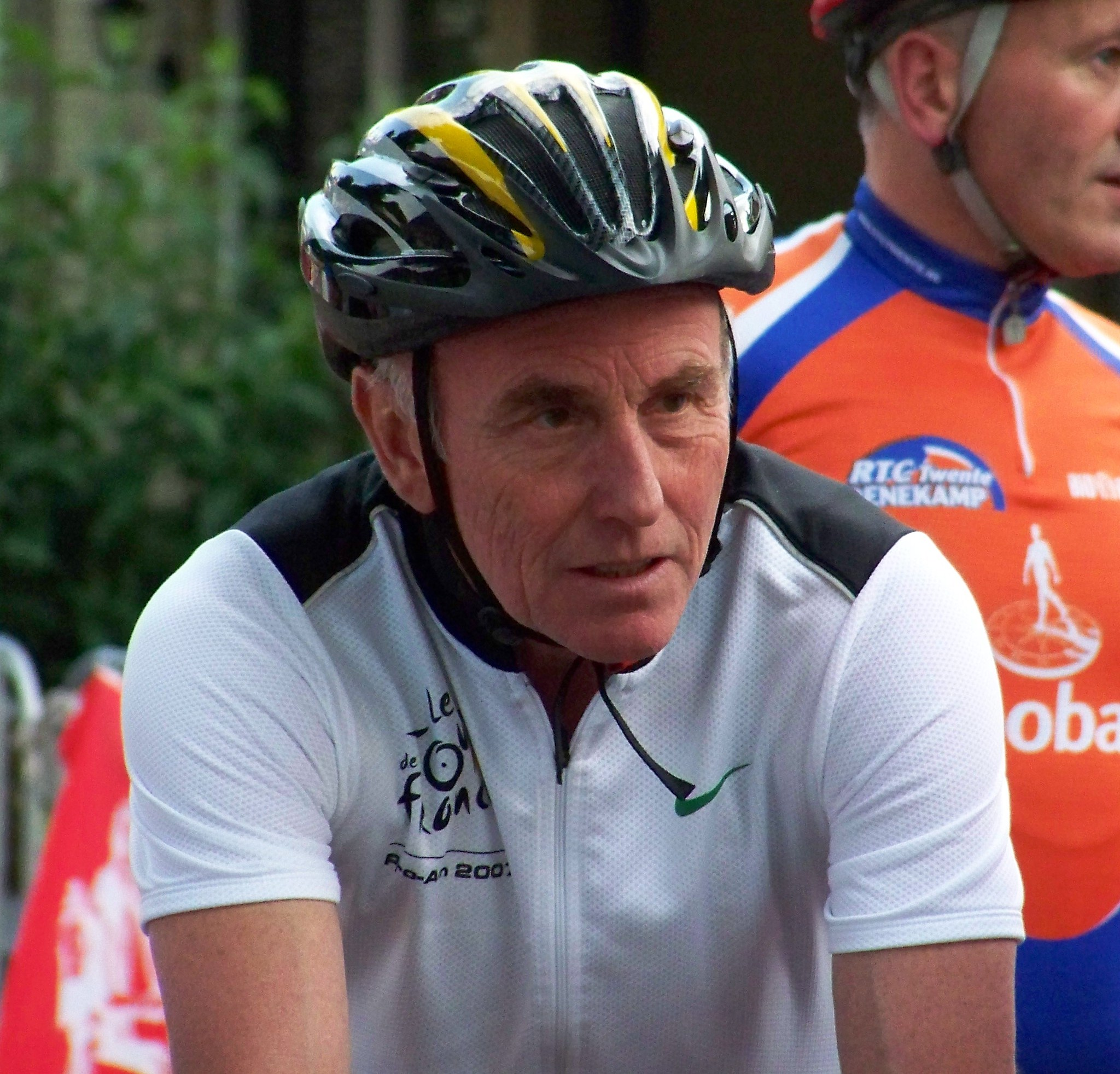
Zoetemelk in 2008

After retiring, Zoetemelk became a directeur sportif with Superconfex, which became Rabobank in 1996. Zoetemelk stayed with Rabobank for 10 years, retiring as a directeur sportif and from the sport after the 2006 Vuelta a España.

Zoetemelk married Françoise Duchaussoy, daughter of the Tour de France executive, Jacques Duchaussoy. They owned and ran the Richemont hotel in Meaux, near Paris. Their son, Karl, was a French mountain bike rider and champion.

== Recognition ==
Joop Zoetemelk was the second Dutch winner of the Tour de France after Jan Janssen. The Dutch cycling federation, the KNWU, named Zoetemelk the best Dutch rider of all time at a gala to mark its 75th anniversary. A statue of him at Rijpwetering, where he grew up, was unveiled on 31 May 2005. He was named sportsman of the year in the Netherlands in 1980 and 1985. Between 1972 and 1985, he won the Gerrit Schulte Trophy nine times as best rider of the year, more than anybody else in Dutch professional racing. The Joop Zoetemelk Classic, a cyclo-sportive over 45, 75 or 150 km, is held every March, organised by the Swift club of which Zoetemelk is a member. The course passes his statue.

== Career achievements ==
=== Major results ===
1968
1st Team time trial, Olympic Games
1st Overall Ronde van Midden-Zeeland

1st Stage 1

1969
1st Overall Circuit de Lorraine

1st Stage 1a

1st Overall Tour de l'Avenir
3rd Overall Tour of Austria

1st Stage 2b, 3 & 6

1970
1st Stage 2b Paris–Luxembourg
2nd Overall Tour de France
2nd Rund um den Henninger Turm
3rd Overall Tour de Romandie
4th Overall Tour de Luxembourg
5th Brabantse Pijl
7th Overall Critérium du Dauphiné Libéré
8th Overall Vuelta a Andalucía
1971
1st Road race, National Road Championships
2nd Overall Tour de France
2nd Overall Grand Prix du Midi Libre
2nd Grand Prix des Nations
4th Overall Tour de Luxembourg

1st Stage 4b

4th La Flèche Wallonne
6th Overall Vuelta a España

1st Mountains classification
1st Stage 16

9th Brabantse Pijl
1972
1st Trophée des Grimpeurs
2nd Road race, National Road Championships
2nd Overall Grand Prix du Midi Libre
2nd Grand Prix des Nations
3rd Overall Tour of Belgium
3rd Overall À travers Lausanne
3rd Amstel Gold Race
4th Overall Tour de la Nouvelle-France
5th Overall Tour de France
5th Road race, UCI Road World Championships
6th Giro di Lombardia
10th Overall Paris–Nice
1973
1st Road race, National Road Championships
1st Tour du Haut Var
1st Stage 1a Escalada a Montjuïc
2nd Overall Grand Prix du Midi Libre

1st Stage 1a & 2

2nd Overall Grand Prix de Fourmies
2nd Trophée des Grimpeurs
3rd Overall Critérium du Dauphiné Libéré

1st Stage 2b

3rd Overall Paris–Nice

1st Stage 7b (ITT)

3rd Overall Four Days of Dunkirk
3rd Grand Prix des Nations
4th Overall Tour de France

1st Combination classification
1st Prologue & Stage 4

4th Amstel Gold Race
5th Road race, UCI Road World Championships
5th Tour of Flanders
9th Liège–Bastogne–Liège
1974
1st Overall Paris–Nice

1st Stages 6a (ITT) & 7b (ITT)

1st Overall Tour de Romandie

1st Stage 4

1st Overall Setmana Catalana de Ciclisme

1st Stage 5

1st Stage 2 Étoile de Bessèges
9th Overall Tour Méditerranéen

1st Stage 2

1975
1st Overall Paris–Nice

1st Stages 6a (ITT) & 7b (ITT)

1st Overall Ronde van Nederland

1st Stage 4

1st Overall À travers Lausanne

1st Stage 1

1st Grand Prix d'Isbergues
2nd Overall Grand Prix du Midi Libre
2nd Overall Escalada a Montjuïc

1st Stage 1b

2nd Road race, National Road Championships
2nd Grand Prix des Nations
3rd Overall Critérium du Dauphiné Libéré
3rd Overall Setmana Catalana de Ciclisme
4th Overall Tour de France

1st Stage 11

5th Road race, UCI Road World Championships
6th Grand Prix of Aargau Canton
7th Critérium des As
8th La Flèche Wallonne
1976
1st Overall À travers Lausanne

1st Stages 1 & 2

1st La Flèche Wallonne
1st Grand Prix Le Télégramme
2nd Overall Tour de France

1st Stage 9, 10 & 20

2nd Overall Escalada a Montjuïc

1st Stage 1a

3rd Grand Prix des Nations
4th Overall Tour Méditerranéen
4th Road race, UCI Road World Championships
4th Road race, National Road Championships
4th Giro di Lombardia
6th Amstel Gold Race
8th Overall Critérium du Dauphiné Libéré

1st Stage 3

8th Overall Paris–Nice
9th Overall Grand Prix du Midi Libre
10th Liège–Bastogne–Liège
10th E3 Prijs Vlaanderen
10th Grand Prix de Wallonie
1977
1st Overall À travers Lausanne

1st Stages 1 & 2

1st Paris–Tours
1st Grand Prix d'Isbergues
1st Stage 2a Tour de l'Aude
2nd Overall Tour de Romandie
2nd Grand Prix des Nations
2nd Trofeo Baracchi (with Freddy Maertens)
3rd Overall Volta a Catalunya

1st Stage 4a (ITT)

3rd Overall Grand Prix du Midi Libre
7th Overall Critérium du Dauphiné Libéré
7th Giro di Lombardia
8th Overall Tour de France
1978
1st Overall À travers Lausanne

1st Stages 1 & 2 (ITT)

1st Paris–Camembert
1st Gran Premio di Lugano
2nd Overall Tour de France

1st Stage 14 (ITT)

2nd Tour du Haut Var
2nd GP Ouest-France
2nd Grand Prix de Monaco
2nd Trofeo Baracchi (with Hennie Kuiper)
3rd Overall Paris–Nice

1st Stage 1 (victory shared with Gerrie Knetemann)

3rd Amstel Gold Race
3rd Grand Prix Le Télégramme
4th Overall Critérium du Dauphiné Libéré
4th Overall Ronde van Nederland
4th Paris–Tours
4th Critérium des As
4th Grand Prix des Nations
6th Overall Critérium International

1st Stage 2

6th Overall Grand Prix du Midi Libre
6th Overall Four Days of Dunkirk
6th Road race, UCI Road World Championships
7th Giro di Lombardia
7th La Flèche Wallonne
1979
1st Overall Vuelta a España

1st Prologue & Stage 8b (ITT)

1st Overall Paris–Nice

1st Stage 7b (ITT)

1st Overall Critérium International

1st Stage 2

1st Overall À travers Lausanne

1st Stages 1 & 2 (ITT)

1st Tour du Haut Var
1st Paris–Tours
1st Critérium des As
1st Prologue Critérium du Dauphiné Libéré
1st Stage 5a Ronde van Nederland
1st Stage 3 Étoile de Bessèges
2nd Overall Tour de France

1st Stage 18

2nd Road race, National Road Championships
3rd Overall Escalada a Montjuïc
3rd Grand Prix des Nations
4th Paris–Roubaix
5th Amstel Gold Race
7th La Flèche Wallonne
10th Tour of Flanders
10th Paris–Brussels
1980
1st Overall Tour de France

1st Stage 1b (TTT), 7a (TTT), 11 (ITT) & 20 (ITT)

1st Critérium des As
1st Grand Prix Pino Cerami
1st Stage 5 Tour de Romandie
1st Stage 1a (ITT) Escalada a Montjuïc
3rd Overall Tour de Suisse
4th Druivenkoers Overijse
5th Overall Tour de Romandie

1st Stage 5

9th Overall Critérium du Dauphiné Libéré

1st Prologue

10th La Flèche Wallonne
1981
1st Overall Escalada a Montjuïc

1st Stages 1b & 1c

1st Grand Prix Pino Cerami
4th Overall Tour de France

1st Stage 1b (TTT) & 4 (TTT)

4th Overall Ronde van Nederland
1982
2nd Overall Tour de France
2nd Overall Étoile des Espoirs
2nd Overall Escalada a Montjuïc

1st Stage 1b (ITT)

3rd Road race, National Road Championships
4th Road race, UCI Road World Championships
6th Overall Tour Midi-Pyrénées
7th Overall Grand Prix du Midi Libre
10th Overall Tour de l'Aude
1983
1st Tour du Haut Var
1st Stage 2 (TTT) Tour de France
2nd Overall Grand Prix du Midi Libre
2nd Overall Tour Méditerranéen
3rd Overall Critérium International
4th Overall Paris–Nice
6th La Flèche Wallonne
1984
2nd Overall Tour de l'Aude
9th Overall Tirreno–Adriatico
9th Liège–Bastogne–Liège
9th Circuit des Frontières
10th Road race, UCI Road World Championships
1985
1st Road race, UCI Road World Championships
1st Overall Tirreno–Adriatico

1st Stage 5 (ITT)

1st Veenendaal–Veenendaal
2nd Grand Prix de Wallonie
3rd Overall Escalada a Montjuïc
4th Overall Tour de Romandie
4th Overall Tour de l'Aude
4th Critérium des As
5th Overall Tour Méditerranéen
7th Overall Critérium International
7th Grand Prix d'Isbergues
8th Grand Prix de Cannes
1986
2nd Amstel Gold Race
3rd Overall Critérium du Dauphiné Libéré
4th Overall Tour of Sweden
5th Overall Tour Méditerranéen
6th La Flèche Wallonne
8th Grand Prix d'Isbergues
1987
1st Amstel Gold Race
2nd Overall Escalada a Montjuïc
8th Critérium des As
10th Overall Four Days of Dunkirk

=== General classification results timeline ===
Grand Tour general classification results
Grand Tour	1970	1971	1972	1973	1974	1975	1976	1977	1978	1979	1980	1981	1982	1983	1984	1985	1986
Vuelta a España	—	6	—	—	—	—	—	—	—	1	—	—	—	—	—	—	—
Giro d'Italia	—	—	—	—	—	—	—	—	—	—	—	—	—	—	—	—	—
Tour de France	2	2	5	4	—	4	2	8	2	2	1	4	2	23	30	12	24
Major stage race general classification results
Major stage race	1970	1971	1972	1973	1974	1975	1976	1977	1978	1979	1980	1981	1982	1983	1984	1985	1986
Paris–Nice	18	DNF	10	2	1	1	8	—	3	1	—	—	DNF	4	—	—	—
Tirreno–Adriatico	—	—	—	—	—	—	—	—	—	—	—	—	—	—	9	1	12
Tour of the Basque Country	—	—	—	—	—	—	—	—	—	—	—	—	—	—	—	—	—
Tour de Romandie	3	—	—	—	1	17	—	2	—	—	5	—	11	12	—	4	11
Critérium du Dauphiné Libéré	7	—	20	3	—	3	8	7	4	13	9	46	33	11	—	—	3
Tour de Suisse	—	—	—	—	—	—	—	—	—	—	3	15	—	—	—	—	—
Volta a Catalunya	—	—	—	—	—	—	—	3	—	—	—	—	—	—	—	—	—

=== Major championships results timeline ===
	1970	1971	1972	1973	1974	1975	1976	1977	1978	1979	1980	1981	1982	1983	1984	1985	1986	1987
World Championships	52	21	5	5	—	5	4	26	6	16	DNF	21	4	38	10	1	52	51
National Championships	—	1	2	1	—	3	4	—	7	2	—	14	3	—	12	—	—	—

Legend
—	Did not compete
DNF	Did not finish

== See also ==
- List of Dutch cyclists who have led the Tour de France general classification
- List of Dutch Olympic cyclists

== Notes ==
Sporting positions
Preceded by Peter Kisner	Dutch National Road Race Champion; 1971	Succeeded by Tino Tabak
Preceded by Tino Tabak	Dutch National Road Race Champion; 1973	Succeeded by Cees Priem
Awards
Preceded by Jan Raas	Dutch Sportsman of the Year; 1980	Succeeded by Hennie Stamsnijder
Preceded by Stephan van den Berg	Dutch Sportsman of the Year; 1985	Succeeded by Hein Vergeer
