= 1975 UCI Road World Championships – Men's road race =

Men's Individual Road Race
1975 UCI Road World Championships
- Rainbow jersey

Race details
- Dates: 31 August 1975
- Stages: 1
- Distance: 266 km (165.3 mi)
- Winning time: 6h 39' 19"

Results
	Winner	Hennie Kuiper (NED)	(Netherlands)
	Second	Roger De Vlaeminck (BEL)	(Belgium)
	Third	Jean-Pierre Danguillaume (FRA)	(France)

The men's road race at the 1975 UCI Road World Championships was the 42nd edition of the event. The race took place on Sunday 31 August 1975 in Yvoir, Belgium. The race was won by Hennie Kuiper of the Netherlands.

== Final classification ==
General classification (1–10)

Rank	Rider	Time
1st place, gold medalist(s)	Hennie Kuiper (NED)	6h 39' 19"
2nd place, silver medalist(s)	Roger De Vlaeminck (BEL)	+ 17"
3rd place, bronze medalist(s)	Jean-Pierre Danguillaume (FRA)	+ 17"
4	Pedro Torres (ESP)	+ 17"
5	Joop Zoetemelk (NED)	+ 17"
6	Bernard Thévenet (FRA)	+ 17"
7	Régis Ovion (FRA)	+ 17"
8	Eddy Merckx (BEL)	+ 17"
9	Lucien Van Impe (BEL)	+ 17"
10	Gerrie Knetemann (NED)	+ 17"
