= 1976 La Flèche Wallonne =

Race details
- Dates: 15 April 1976
- Stages: 1
- Distance: 227 km (141.1 mi)
- Winning time: 5h 43' 58"

Results
	Winner	Joop Zoetemelk (NED)	(Gan–Mercier–Hutchinson)
	Second	Frans Verbeeck (BEL)	(IJsboerke–Colnago)
	Third	Freddy Maertens (BEL)	(Flandria–Velda–West Vlaams Vleesbedrijf)

The 1976 La Flèche Wallonne was the 40th edition of La Flèche Wallonne cycle race and was held on 15 April 1976. The race started and finished in Verviers. The race was won by Joop Zoetemelk of the Gan–Mercier team.

== General classification ==
Final general classification

Rank	Rider	Team	Time
1	Joop Zoetemelk (NED)	Gan–Mercier–Hutchinson	5h 43' 58"
2	Frans Verbeeck (BEL)	IJsboerke–Colnago	+ 57"
3	Freddy Maertens (BEL)	Flandria–Velda–West Vlaams Vleesbedrijf	+ 57"
4	Eddy Merckx (BEL)	Molteni–Campagnolo	+ 57"
5	Walter Godefroot (BEL)	IJsboerke–Colnago	+ 5' 57"
6	Herman Van Springel (BEL)	Flandria–Velda–West Vlaams Vleesbedrijf	+ 5' 57"
7	Dietrich Thurau (FRG)	TI–Raleigh–Campagnolo	+ 5' 57"
8	André Dierickx (BEL)	Maes Pils–Rokado	+ 5' 57"
9	Lucien Van Impe (BEL)	Gitane–Campagnolo	+ 5' 57"
10	Ludo Peeters (BEL)	IJsboerke–Colnago	+ 9' 57"
