= 1973 Critérium du Dauphiné Libéré =

1979 Cycling race in France

Race details
- Dates: 28 May – 4 June 1973
- Stages: 7 + Prologue
- Distance: 1,423 km (884 mi)
- Winning time: 39h 24' 42"

Results
	Winner	Luis Ocaña (ESP)	(Bic)
	Second	Bernard Thévenet (FRA)	(Peugeot–BP–Michelin)
	Third	Joop Zoetemelk (NED)	(Gitane–Frigécrème)
	Points	Cyrille Guimard (FRA)	(Gan–Mercier–Hutchinson)
	Mountains	Luis Ocaña (ESP)	(Bic)
	Team	Peugeot–BP–Michelin	

The 1973 Critérium du Dauphiné Libéré was the 25th edition of the cycle race and was held from 28 May to 4 June 1973. The race started in Thonon and finished at Saint-Étienne. The race was won by Luis Ocaña of the Bic team.

== Teams ==
Ten teams, containing a total of 100 riders, participated in the race:

- Bic
- Canada Dry–Gazelle
- Flandria–Carpenter–Shimano
- Gan–Mercier–Hutchinson
- Gitane–Frigécrème
- Kas–Kaskol
- La Casera
- Peugeot–BP–Michelin
- Sonolor
- Watney–Maes Pils

== Route ==
Stage characteristics and winners
Stage	Date	Course	Distance	Type	Winner
P	28 May	Thonon	9.5 km (5.9 mi)	Team time trial	Bic
1	29 May	Annecy to Bourg-en-Bresse	186 km (116 mi)		Frans Verbeeck (BEL)
2a	30 May	Bourg-en-Bresse to Belley	84 km (52 mi)		Cyrille Guimard (FRA)
2b	30 May	Belley to Grenoble	109 km (68 mi)		Joop Zoetemelk (NED)
3	31 May	Grenoble to Briançon	182 km (113 mi)		Bernard Thévenet (FRA)
4	1 June	Gap to Carpentras	207 km (129 mi)		Régis Ovion (FRA)
5	2 June	Orange to Lyon	248 km (154 mi)		Jean-Claude Genty (FRA)
6a	3 June	Lyon to Lyon	147 km (91 mi)		Wilfried David (BEL)
6b	3 June	Montceau-les-Mines to Le Creusot	31 km (19 mi)	Individual time trial	Luis Ocaña (ESP)
7	4 June	Montceau-les-Mines to Saint-Étienne	229 km (142 mi)		Cees Bal (NED)

== General classification ==
Final general classification

Rank	Rider	Team	Time
1	Luis Ocaña (ESP)	Bic	39h 24' 42"
2	Bernard Thévenet (FRA)	Peugeot–BP–Michelin	+ 1' 10"
3	Joop Zoetemelk (NED)	Gitane–Frigécrème	+ 10' 09"
4	Régis Ovion (FRA)	Peugeot–BP–Michelin	+ 10' 59"
5	Vicente López Carril (ESP)	Kas–Kaskol	+ 11' 55"
6	Antonio Martos (ESP)	Kas–Kaskol	+ 14' 40"
7	Raymond Poulidor (FRA)	Gan–Mercier–Hutchinson	+ 16' 58"
8	Frans Verbeeck (BEL)	Watney–Maes Pils	+ 18' 48"
9	Raymond Delisle (FRA)	Peugeot–BP–Michelin	+ 19' 45"
10	Willy Van Neste (BEL)	Sonolor	+ 20' 14"
