= 1979 Amstel Gold Race =

Dutch cycling race

The 1979 Amstel Gold Race was the 14th edition of the annual Amstel Gold Race road bicycle race, held on Saturday April 14, 1979, in the Dutch province of Limburg. The race stretched 237 kilometres, with the start in Heerlen and the finish in Meerssen. There were a total of 137 competitors, and 32 cyclists finished the race.

== Result ==
Final result (1–10)
Rank	Rider	Time
1	Jan Raas (NED)	5:59:56
2	Henk Lubberding (NED)	+ 0.39
3	Sven-Åke Nilsson (SWE)	+ 0
4	Willy Teirlinck (BEL)	+ 1.06
5	Joop Zoetemelk (NED)	+ 0
6	Michel Laurent (FRA)	+ 0
7	Frits Pirard (NED)	+ 1.13
8	Lucien Van Impe (BEL)	+ 1.40
9	Claude Criquielion (BEL)	+ 0
10	René Martens (BEL)	+ 0
