= Lucien Van Impe =

Belgian cyclist

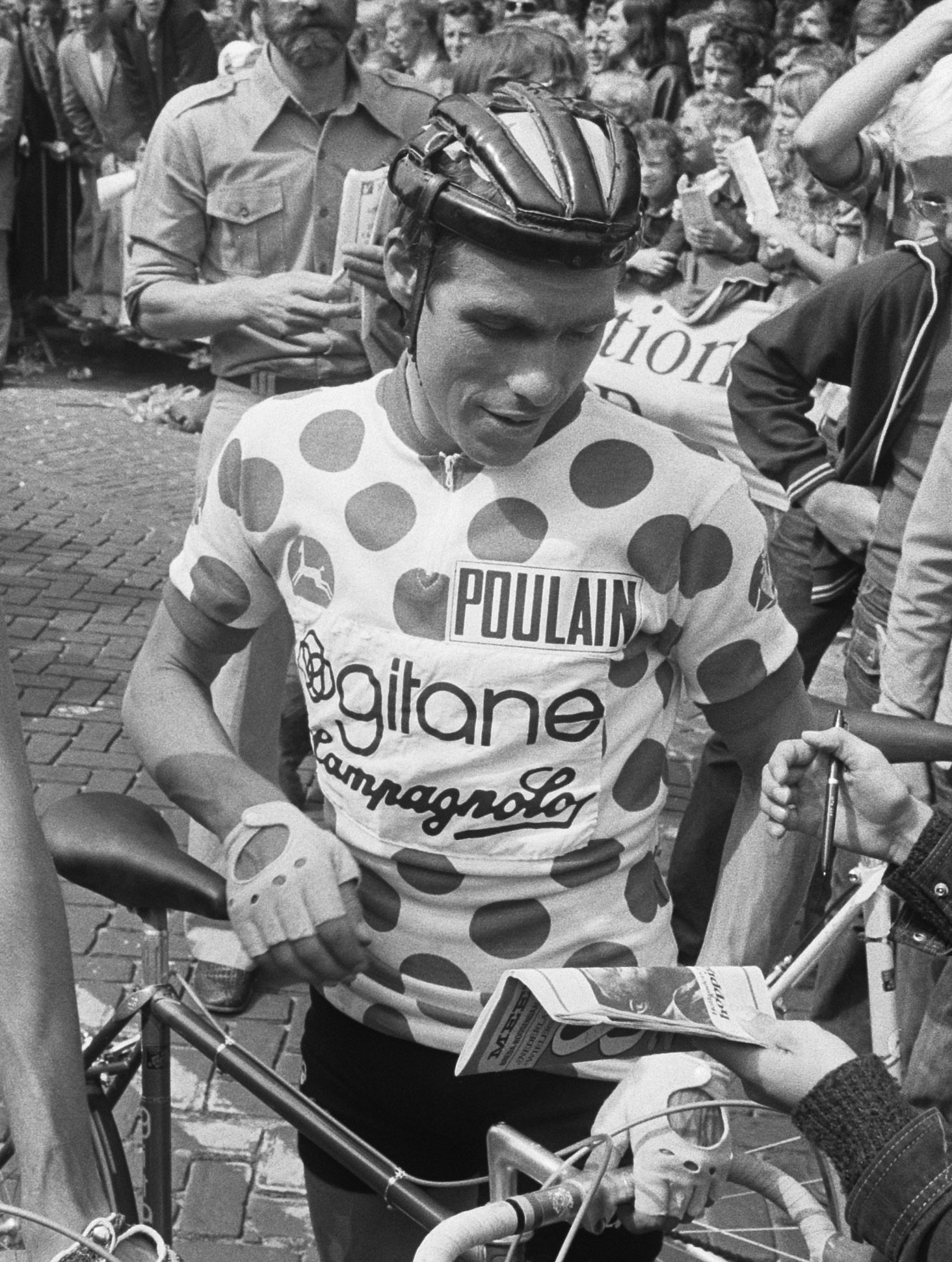
- Van Impe at the 1975 Acht van Chaam

Personal information
- Full name: Lucien Van Impe
- Nickname: de kleine van Mere
- Born: 20 October 1946 (age 79) Mere, Belgium
- Height: 1.67 m (5 ft 5 1/2 in)
- Weight: 59 kg (130 lb; 9 st 4 lb)

Cycling career
- Sport: Cycling
- Discipline: Road
- Role: Rider
- Rider type: Climber

Professional teams
- 1969–1974: Sonolor–Lejeune
- 1975–1976: Gitane–Campagnolo
- 1977: Lejeune–BP
- 1978: C&A
- 1979: Kas–Campagnolo
- 1980: Marc–Carlos–V.R.D.–Woningbouw
- 1981: Boston–Mavic
- 1982-1984: Metauro Mobil
- 1985: Santini–Krups
- 1986: Dormilón
- 1987: Sigma–Fina

Major wins
- Grand Tours Tour de France General classification (1976) Mountains classification (1971, 1972, 1975, 1977, 1981, 1983) 9 individual stages (1972, 1973, 1975, 1976, 1977, 1979, 1981, 1983) Giro d'Italia Mountains classification (1982, 1983) 1 individual stage (1983) Vuelta a España 1 individual stage (1979) One-day races and Classics National Road Race Championships (1983)

Lucien Van Impe (Flemish pronunciation: [lyˈɕɛ̃ː vɑn ˈɪmpə]; born 20 October 1946) is a former Belgian cyclist, who competed professionally between 1969 and 1987. He excelled mainly as a climber in multiple-day races such as the Tour de France. He was the winner of the 1976 Tour de France, and six times winner of the mountains classification in the Tour de France.

== Biography ==
Van Impe credits the start of his career to Spaniard Federico Bahamontes, a climber nicknamed the eagle of Toledo and a former Tour de France winner. In 1968 van Impe was King of the Mountains in the Tour de l'Avenir. Bahamontes used his influence to get van Impe a contract as a professional. In 1969, Van Impe started his professional career with a 12th place in the 1969 Tour de France. In 1971, Van Impe won his first mountains classification in the Tour de France. He would repeat that five more times, a record then shared with Bahamontes. When Richard Virenque broke the record with a seventh victory in 2004, Van Impe criticized Virenque for being opportunistic rather than the best climber; he said he had himself refrained from breaking Bahamontes' record himself out of reverence.

Van Impe's Sonolor team fused with Gitane to become Gitane-Campagnolo in 1975. Former French champion Cyrille Guimard, who retired in early 1976, became directeur sportif in 1976. He was considered to be among the pre-race favorites as this edition had eight high mountain stages and it was expected to be a battle between Van Impe, Joop Zoetemelk and defending champion Bernard Thevenet. Thevenet was no match for these two riders from the Low Countries in the 1976 edition, and despite a strong start from debutant Freddy Maertens, the race became a duel between Van Impe and Zoetemelk with the mountains of the 1976 Tour de France deciding who would become champ. Guimard claims it was his order to attack Zoetemelk that won Van Impe the Tour, shouting at Van Impe that he'd run him off the road with the car if he didn't attack. Van Impe has denied this. Despite Zoetemelk winning three high mountain stages Van Impe's attack gave him a lead of more than +3:00 on the Dutchman, and he then clinched his victory by finishing more than a minute ahead of Zoetemelk in the final individual time trial.

After 1976, Van Impe changed teams. In the 1977 Tour de France he started favorite but failed to take a lead in the mountains. He waited until the last mountain stage to attack, which finished atop Alpe d'Huez, and was in the lead late in the stage but forgot to eat, which caused his lead to slip away. He was still in the lead when he was hit by one of the TV cars. Due to his team car being so far behind he had to stand on the side of the road and wait several minutes for a new bike as Bernard Thévenet and Hennie Kuiper rode past; and the 1977 edition would be decided between the two of them as a result.

After three years where he wasn't among the GC favorites, Van Impe rode incredibly well in the 1981 Tour de France. He finished on the podium in 2nd place, although he was more than +10:00 behind Bernard Hinault, however he won the mountain classification yet again. All total Van Impe finished in the top 5 of the Tour de France eight times.

He also won the mountain classification in the Giro d'Italia twice.

Single-day races were not his specialty and it was a surprise that he won the national championship in 1983.

Van Impe started 15 Tours de France and reached the finish in Paris every time. This was a record when he finished his last, but he would be passed for most Tour finishes by Joop Zoetemelk in 1986, and eventually Sylvain Chavanel reached 16 finishes in 2018. He is currently tied for 2nd with Viatcheslav Ekimov who finished his 15th edition in 2006.

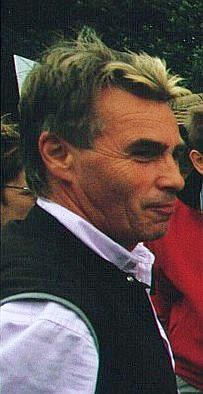
Van Impe in 2001

From 2007 to 2013, he was sporting director of a cycling team of professional riders, called Intermarché–Wanty.

Lucien Van Impe lives in Impe (his family name refers to that town) with his wife Rita, he has two grown up children, a son and a daughter. His house is called Alpe D'Huez, after the French mountain where he took the yellow jersey (the leader in the Tour de France) in 1976. When he came home that year, the bar where his supporters gathered every day to watch him win the Tour, was painted yellow entirely.

During and after his professional career, Van Impe has never tested positive, refused a doping test or confessed having used doping.

He has been commemorated with an abstract statue depicting him on his bike, installed on a stone plinth at a small roundabout in Belgium, approximately 180 km before the finish of the Tour of Flanders.

Van Impe suffered a cardiac arrest in 2017, but completely recovered from it.

== Major results ==
=== Road ===
1966
5th Flèche Ardennaise
1968
Tour de l'Avenir

1st Mountains classification
1st Stage 8

1969
1st Overall Vuelta a Navarra Amateurs
3rd Circuit des Frontières
1970
1st Mountains classification, Grand Prix du Midi Libre
2nd Manx Trophy
6th Overall Tour de France
7th Overall Tour de Romandie
9th Overall Setmana Catalana de Ciclisme
10th Liège–Bastogne–Liège
1971
1st Mountains classification, Tour de Romandie
3rd Overall Tour de France

1st Mountains classification

5th Overall GP du Midi Libre
7th Overall Critérium du Dauphiné Libéré
9th Overall Tour de Luxembourg

1st Mountains classification

9th Rund um den Henninger Turm
10th Overall Étoile des Espoirs
1972
2nd Overall Tour de Romandie

1st Points classification

3rd Overall Critérium du Dauphiné Libéré
4th Overall Tour de France

1st Mountains classification
1st Stage 12

5th Overall Grand Prix du Midi Libre
6th Overall À travers Lausanne
1973
1st Stage 3 Grand Prix du Midi Libre
2nd Overall Tour de Romandie

1st Stage 3

5th Overall Tour de France

1st Stage 12b
Held after Stages 7b & 8

7th Trophée des Grimpeurs
1974
1st Mountains classification, Tour de Romandie
7th GP du Tournaisis
9th Paris–Camembert
1975
1st Overall Tour de l'Aude

1st Stage 1 & 3

2nd Grand Prix d'Isbergues
3rd Overall Tour de France

1st Mountains classification
1st Stages 14 & 18 (ITT)

5th Overall Critérium du Dauphiné Libéré

1st Mountains classification

5th Overall Grand Prix du Midi Libre

1st Mountains classification

5th Overall Escalada a Montjuïc
6th Paris–Bourges
6th Trophée des Grimpeurs
7th Druivenkoers Overijse
9th Road race, UCI World Championships
1976
1st Overall Tour de France

1st Stage 14
Held after Stages 10–12, 14–18b & 20

1st Trophée des Grimpeurs
1st Stage 2b Tour de l'Aude
2nd Overall Grand Prix du Midi Libre

1st Stage 4b (ITT)

5th Overall Critérium du Dauphiné Libéré

1st Mountains classification

7th Overall Escalada a Montjuïc
7th Nokere Koerse
9th La Flèche Wallonne
9th Circuit de l'Aulne
1977
2nd Overall Tour de Suisse

1st Mountains classification
1st Combination classification
1st Stages 7 & 8

3rd Overall Tour de France

1st Mountains classification
1st Stage 15b (ITT)

3rd Overall Critérium du Dauphiné Libéré

1st Mountains classification
1st Stage 6

6th Road race, National Road Championships
6th Trophée des Grimpeurs
8th Overall Tour de Romandie
1978
9th Overall Tour de France
1979
1st Stage 16 Tour de France
5th Overall Vuelta a España

1st Stage 15

6th Overall Volta a Catalunya

1st Stage 7a (ITT)

6th Overall Tour of Belgium
6th Liège–Bastogne–Liège
7th Tour de Wallonie
8th Overall Volta a la Comunitat Valenciana
8th Amstel Gold Race
1980
4th Overall Tour de Suisse

1st Mountains classification

8th De Kustpijl
1981
1st Polynormande
2nd Overall Tour de France

1st Mountains classification
1st Stage 5

5th Omloop Mandel-Leie-Schelde
9th GP Stad Vilvoorde
1982
3rd Overall Tour of Sweden
4th Overall Giro d'Italia

1st Mountains classification

5th Gran Premio Industria e Commercio di Prato
6th Grand Prix Eddy Merckx
10th Druivenkoers Overijse
1983
1st Road race, National Road Championships
1st Heusden Koers
4th Overall Tour de France

1st Mountains classification
1st Stage 19 (ITT)

8th Giro dell'Appennino
9th Overall Giro d'Italia

1st Mountains classification
1st Stage 11

10th GP Montelupo
1984
6th Nationale Sluitingsprijs
7th Overall Giro d'Italia
1985
5th Grote 1-MeiPrijs
10th Giro dell'Appennino
1986
1st Overall Vuelta a los Valles Mineros

1st Stage 1

8th Overall Vuelta a Asturias

==== Grand Tour general classification results timeline ====
Grand Tour	1969	1970	1971	1972	1973	1974	1975	1976	1977	1978	1979	1980	1981	1982	1983	1984	1985	1986
Vuelta a España	—	—	—	—	—	—	—	—	—	—	5	—	—	—	—	—	—	11
Giro d'Italia	—	—	—	—	—	—	—	—	—	—	—	—	—	4	9	7	13	—
Tour de France	12	6	3	4	5	18	3	1	3	9	11	16	2	—	4	—	27	—

Legend
—	Did not compete
DNF	Did not finish

=== Criteriums ===
1973
1st Plogastel Saint-Germain
1974
1st Outer
1st Lalaing
1975
1st GP Erpe-Mere
1st Ottignies
1st Lannion
1st Lescoet-Jugon
1st Kitzbuehl
1976
1st Creusot
1st Plancoët
1st Brette-les-Pins
1977
1st Trophée des Cimes
1st Aalst
1st Dunières
1st Pleaux
1978
1st Lamaul-Guimileau
1st Geraardsbergen
1979
1st Assenede
1st Mende
1st Pampelune
1980
1st Tirlemont
1981
1st Moerbeke
1st Aalst
1st Saint-Martin de Landelles
1982
1st San Crocce sull'Arno
1st Kalmthout
1983
1st GP Erpe-Mere
1st Ronse
1984
1st Visp - Grächen
1st Buggenhout
1987
1st Mere

=== Honours and awards ===
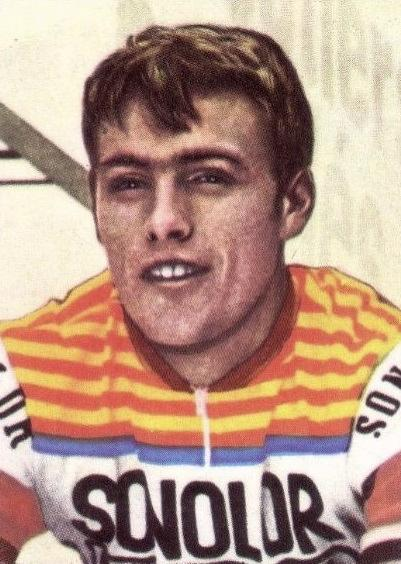
Van Impe in 1971

- Challenge Sedis: 1976
- Former record of most Mountains classification wins in the Tour de France: 6 from 1971 to 1983
- A race in Mere, GP Lucien Van Impe
- Best climber of all times by climbbybike.com: 2007
- A race in Serskamp, Lucien Van Impe Classic: From 2014
- Statue in Erpe-Mere: 2016
- Honorary citizen of Lede: 2018
