= 1980 Tour de Suisse =

Race details
- Dates: 11–20 June 1980
- Stages: 9 + Prologue
- Distance: 1,670 km (1,038 mi)
- Winning time: 43h 13' 57"

Results
	Winner	Mario Beccia (ITA)	(Hoonved–Bottecchia)
	Second	Josef Fuchs (SUI)	(Gis Gelati)
	Third	Joop Zoetemelk (NED)	(TI–Raleigh–Creda)
	Points	Daniel Willems (BEL)	(IJsboerke–Warncke Eis)
	Mountains	Lucien Van Impe (BEL)	(Marc–Carlos–V.R.D.–Woningbouw)
	Combination	Daniel Willems (BEL)	(IJsboerke–Warncke Eis)
	Team	Cilo–Aufina	

The 1980 Tour de Suisse was the 44th edition of the Tour de Suisse cycle race and was held from 11 June to 20 June 1980. The race started in Rheinfelden and finished in Zürich. The race was won by Mario Beccia of the Hoonved–Bottecchia team.

== General classification ==
Final general classification

Rank	Rider	Team	Time
1	Mario Beccia (ITA)	Hoonved–Bottecchia	43h 13' 57"
2	Josef Fuchs (SUI)	Gis Gelati	+ 2' 12"
3	Joop Zoetemelk (NED)	TI–Raleigh–Creda	+ 3' 15"
4	Lucien Van Impe (BEL)	Marc–Carlos–V.R.D.–Woningbouw	+ 4' 25"
5	Daniel Willems (BEL)	IJsboerke–Warncke Eis	+ 4' 27"
6	Luciano Loro (ITA)	Hoonved–Bottecchia	+ 5' 04"
7	Albert Zweifel (SUI)	Switzerland	+ 5' 50"
8	Gottfried Schmutz (SUI)	Cilo–Aufina	+ 6' 08"
9	Paul Wellens (BEL)	TI–Raleigh–Creda	+ 6' 28"
10	Theo de Rooij (NED)	IJsboerke–Warncke Eis	+ 6' 36"
