= 1980 Critérium du Dauphiné Libéré =

Race details
- Dates: 26 May – 2 June 1980
- Stages: 7 + Prologue
- Distance: 1,396 km (867 mi)
- Winning time: 37h 47' 45"

Results
Jersey awarded to the overall winner	Winner	Johan van der Velde (NED)	(TI–Raleigh–Creda)
	Second	Raymond Martin (FRA)	(Miko–Mercier–Vivagel)
	Third	Joaquim Agostinho (POR)	(Puch–Sem–Campagnolo)
Jersey awarded to the points classification winner	Points	Johan van der Velde (NED)	(TI–Raleigh–Creda)
Jersey awarded to the mountains classification winner	Mountains	Christian Seznec (FRA)	(Miko–Mercier–Vivagel)
	Team	TI–Raleigh–Creda	

The 1980 Critérium du Dauphiné Libéré was the 32nd edition of the cycle race and was held from 26 May to 2 June 1980. The race started in Évian-les-Bains and finished at Mont Revard. The race was won by Johan van der Velde of the TI–Raleigh team.

== Teams ==
Ten teams, containing a total of 100 riders, participated in the race:

- Marc–Carlos–V.R.D.–Woningbouw
- DAF Trucks–Lejeune
- IJsboerke–Warncke Eis
- La Redoute–Motobécane
- Miko–Mercier–Vivagel
- Peugeot–Esso–Michelin
- Puch–Sem
- Splendor–Admiral
- Teka
- TI–Raleigh–Creda

== Route ==
Stage characteristics and winners
Stage	Date	Course	Distance	Type	Winner
P	26 May	Évian-les-Bains	7 km (4.3 mi)	Individual time trial	Joop Zoetemelk (NED)
1a	27 May	Évian-les-Bains to Mâcon	202 km (126 mi)		Patrick Friou (FRA)
1b	27 May	Mâcon to Mâcon	15 km (9.3 mi)	Team time trial	Miko–Mercier–Vivagel
2	28 May	Mâcon to Saint-Étienne	253 km (157 mi)		Guido Van Calster (BEL)
3a	29 May	Saint-Étienne to Vienne	104 km (65 mi)		Sean Kelly (IRL)
3b	29 May	La Voulte-sur-Rhône to Lyon	33.25 km (20.66 mi)	Individual time trial	Claude Criquielion (BEL)
4	30 May	La Voulte-sur-Rhône to Orange	220 km (140 mi)		Jean-Marie Michel (FRA)
5	31 May	Orange to Orange	188 km (117 mi)		Charles Jochums (BEL)
6	1 June	Gap to Grenoble	166 km (103 mi)		Johan van der Velde (NED)
7	2 June	Veurey-Voroize to Mont Revard	208 km (129 mi)		Raymond Martin (FRA)

== General classification ==
Final general classification

Rank	Rider	Team	Time
1	Johan van der Velde (NED)	TI–Raleigh–Creda	37h 47' 45"
2	Raymond Martin (FRA)	Miko–Mercier–Vivagel	+ 2' 10"
3	Joaquim Agostinho (POR)	Puch–Sem–Campagnolo	+ 3' 19"
4	Hennie Kuiper (NED)	Peugeot–Esso–Michelin	+ 3' 47"
5	Marino Lejarreta (ESP)	Teka	+ 3' 59"
6	Sven-Åke Nilsson (SWE)	Miko–Mercier–Vivagel	+ 4' 26"
7	Paul Wellens (BEL)	TI–Raleigh–Creda	+ 4' 59"
8	Bernard Thévenet (FRA)	Teka	+ 5' 02"
9	Joop Zoetemelk (NED)	TI–Raleigh–Creda	+ 5' 08"
10	Claude Criquielion (BEL)	Splendor–Admiral	+ 5' 52"
