= 1972 Tour de Romandie =

Cycle race

Race details
- Dates: 10–14 May 1972
- Stages: 4 + Prologue
- Distance: 687.9 km (427.4 mi)
- Winning time: 18h 53' 34"

Results
	Winner	Bernard Thévenet (FRA)
	Second	Lucien Van Impe (BEL)
	Third	Raymond Delisle (FRA)

The 1972 Tour de Romandie was the 26th edition of the Tour de Romandie cycle race and was held from 10 May to 14 May 1972. The race started and finished in Geneva. The race was won by Bernard Thévenet.

== General classification ==
Final general classification
Rank	Rider	Time
1	Bernard Thévenet (FRA)	18h 53' 34"
2	Lucien Van Impe (BEL)	+ 22"
3	Raymond Delisle (FRA)	+ 41"
4	Mariano Martínez (FRA)	+ 49"
5	Roger Pingeon (FRA)	+ 2' 01"
6	Gösta Pettersson (SWE)	+ 2' 04"
7	Franco Bitossi (ITA)	+ 2' 27"
8	Gianni Motta (ITA)	+ 2' 41"
9	Pierre Martelozzo (ITA)	+ 2' 58"
10	Willy Van Neste (BEL)	+ 3' 14"
