= 1985 UCI Road World Championships – Men's road race =

Men's Individual Road Race
1985 UCI Road World Championships
- Rainbow jersey

Race details
- Dates: 1 September 1985
- Stages: 1
- Distance: 265.5 km (165.0 mi)
- Winning time: 6h 26' 38"

Results
	Winner	Joop Zoetemelk (NED)	(Netherlands)
	Second	Greg LeMond (USA)	(United States)
	Third	Moreno Argentin (ITA)	(Italy)

The men's road race at the 1985 UCI Road World Championships was the 52nd edition of the event. The race took place on Sunday 1 September 1985 in Italy. Bernard Hinault had won the Giro and the Tour and was attempting to become only the second rider to win the Triple Crown, but he abandoned the race long before the winning group formed. The race was won by Joop Zoetemelk of the Netherlands.

== Final classification ==
General classification (1–10)

Rank	Rider	Time
1st place, gold medalist(s)	Joop Zoetemelk (NED)	6h 26' 38"
2nd place, silver medalist(s)	Greg LeMond (USA)	+ 3"
3rd place, bronze medalist(s)	Moreno Argentin (ITA)	+ 3"
4	Marc Madiot (FRA)	+ 3"
5	Harald Maier (AUT)	+ 3"
6	Juan Fernández (ESP)	+ 3"
7	Stephen Roche (IRL)	+ 3"
8	Jörg Müller (SUI)	+ 3"
9	Johan van der Velde (NED)	+ 3"
10	Robert Millar (GBR)	+ 3"
