= 1979 Tour du Haut Var =

Race details
- Dates: 25 February 1979
- Stages: 1
- Distance: 176 km (109.4 mi)
- Winning time: 4h 42' 17"

Results
	Winner	Joop Zoetemelk (NED)
	Second	Jean Chassang (FRA)
	Third	Jean-René Bernaudeau (FRA)

The 1979 Tour du Haut Var was the 11th edition of the Tour du Haut Var cycle race and was held on 25 February 1979. The race started in Nice and finished in Seillans. The race was won by Joop Zoetemelk.

== General classification ==
Final general classification

Rank	Rider	Time
1	Joop Zoetemelk (NED)	4h 42' 17"
2	Jean Chassang (FRA)	+ 0"
3	Jean-René Bernaudeau (FRA)	+ 3"
4	Hennie Kuiper (NED)	+ 12"
5	Pascal Simon (FRA)	+ 40"
6	Herman Van Springel (BEL)	+ 40"
7	Régis Ovion (FRA)	+ 42"
8	André Chalmel (FRA)	+ 49"
9	Paul Sherwen (GBR)	+ 49"
10	Christian Levavasseur (FRA)	+ 49"
