= 1972 Critérium du Dauphiné Libéré =

Race details
- Dates: 30 May – 4 June 1972
- Stages: 5 + Prologue
- Distance: 997.7 km (619.9 mi)
- Winning time: 26h 20' 11"

Results
	Winner	Luis Ocaña (ESP)	(Bic)
	Second	Bernard Thévenet (FRA)	(Peugeot–BP–Michelin)
	Third	Lucien Van Impe (BEL)	(Sonolor–Lejeune)
	Points	Cyrille Guimard (FRA)	(Gan–Mercier–Hutchinson)
	Mountains	Luis Ocaña (ESP)	(Bic)
	Team	Peugeot–BP–Michelin	

The 1972 Critérium du Dauphiné Libéré was the 24th edition of the cycle race and was held from 30 May to 4 June 1972. The race started in Chalon-sur-Saône and finished at Avignon. The race was won by Luis Ocaña of the Bic team.

== Teams ==
Ten teams, containing a total of 100 riders, participated in the race:

- Beaulieu–Flandria
- Bic
- Gan–Mercier–Hutchinson
- Gitane
- La Casera–Peña Bahamontes
- Magniflex–de Gribaldy
- Peugeot–BP–Michelin
- Sonolor–Lejeune
- Watney–Avia
- Werner

== Route ==
Stage characteristics and winners
Stage	Date	Course	Distance	Type	Winner
P	30 May	Chalon-sur-Saône	7.2 km (4.5 mi)	Team time trial	Peugeot–BP–Michelin
1	31 May	Montceau-les-Mines to Saint-Étienne	244 km (152 mi)		Roger Pingeon (FRA)
2	1 June	Saint-Étienne to Bourg-en-Bresse	190 km (120 mi)		Frans Verbeeck (BEL)
3	2 June	Bourg-en-Bresse to Chambéry	205 km (127 mi)		Robert Bouloux (FRA)
4a	3 June	Chambéry to Grenoble	68 km (42 mi)		Luis Ocaña (ESP)
4b	3 June	Valence to Romans	95 km (59 mi)		Cyrille Guimard (FRA)
5a	4 June	Valence to Crest	31.5 km (19.6 mi)	Individual time trial	Luis Ocaña (ESP)
5b	4 June	Crest to Avignon	157 km (98 mi)		Régis Delépine (FRA)

== General classification ==
Final general classification

Rank	Rider	Team	Time
1	Luis Ocaña (ESP)	Bic	26h 20' 11"
2	Bernard Thévenet (FRA)	Peugeot–BP–Michelin	+ 3' 05"
3	Lucien Van Impe (BEL)	Sonolor–Lejeune	+ 5' 25"
4	Mariano Martínez (FRA)	Van Cauter–Magniflex–de Gribaldy	+ 7' 20"
5	Yves Hézard (FRA)	Sonolor–Lejeune	+ 7' 20"
6	Robert Bouloux (FRA)	Peugeot–BP–Michelin	+ 8' 28"
7	Raymond Poulidor (FRA)	Gan–Mercier–Hutchinson	+ 8' 35"
8	Ventura Díaz (ESP)	Werner	+ 9' 44"
9	Agustín Tamames (ESP)	Werner	+ 9' 53"
10	Gérard Moneyron (FRA)	Gan–Mercier–Hutchinson	+ 9' 53"
