= 1967 Tirreno–Adriatico =

Race details
- Dates: 8–12 March 1967
- Stages: 5
- Distance: 1,067.9 km (663.6 mi)
- Winning time: 27h 48' 05"

Results
	Winner	Franco Bitossi (ITA)
	Second	Carmine Preziosi (ITA)
	Third	Vito Taccone (ITA)

The 1967 Tirreno–Adriatico was the second edition of the Tirreno–Adriatico cycle race, held from 8 March to 12 March 1967. The race started in Santa Marinella and finished in San Benedetto del Tronto. It was won by Franco Bitossi.

== General classification ==
Final general classification

Rank	Rider	Time
1	Franco Bitossi (ITA)	27h 48' 05"
2	Carmine Preziosi (ITA)	+ 12"
3	Vito Taccone (ITA)	+ 12"
4	Roberto Poggiali (ITA)	+ 22"
5	Michele Dancelli (ITA)	+ 32"
6	Dino Zandegù (ITA)	+ 32"
7	Luciano Armani (ITA)	+ 42"
8	Vittorio Adorni (ITA)	+ 1' 22"
9	Ole Ritter (DEN)	+ 1' 22"
10	Giancarlo Polidori (ITA)	+ 1' 22"
