= Maël-Pestivien =

Maël-Pestivien Mael-Pestivien
- Commune
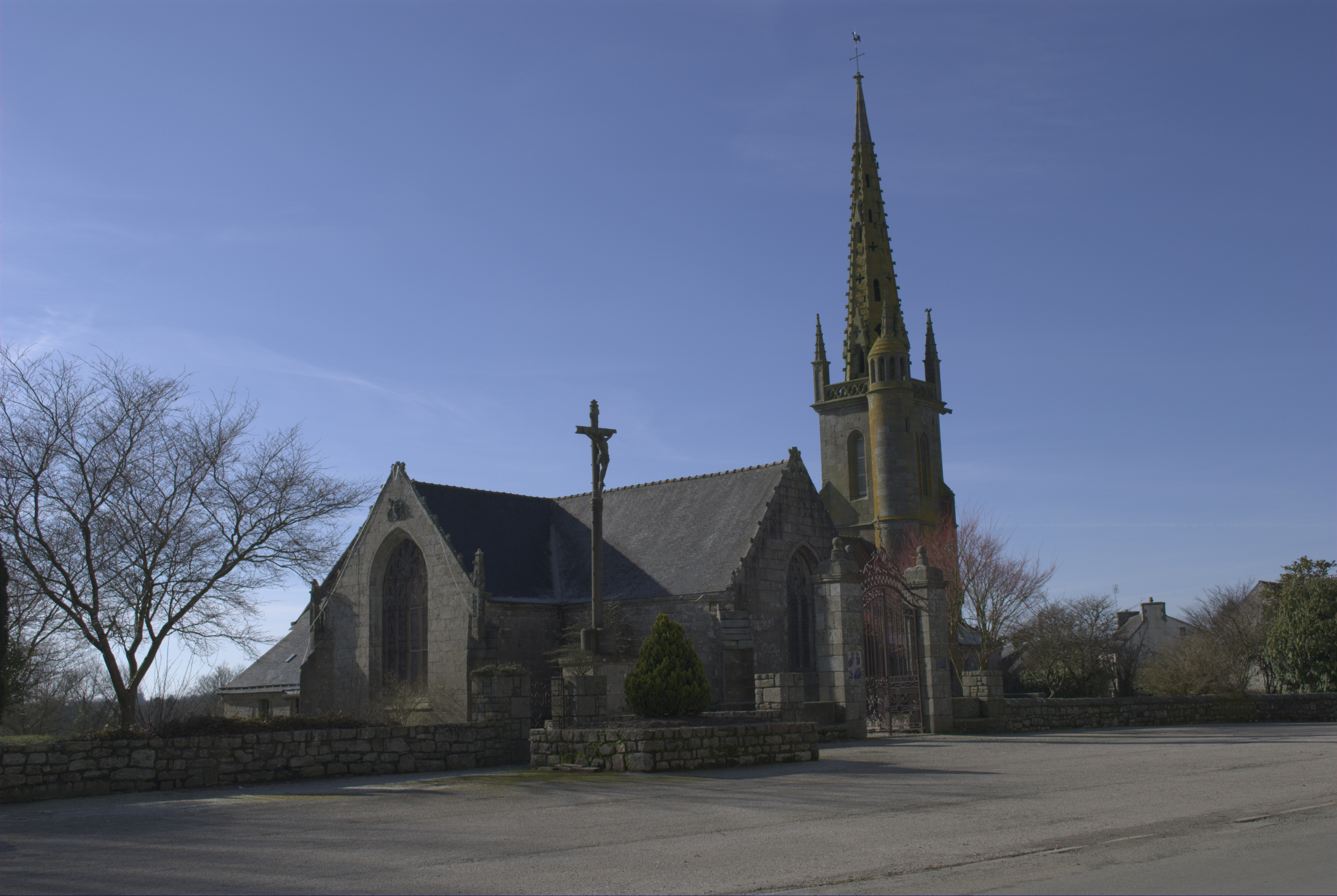
- The church of Saint-Laurent
- Location of Maël-Pestivien
- Location within France Location within Brittany
- Coordinates: 48°23′43″N 3°17′44″W
- Country: France
- Region: Brittany
- Department: Côtes-d'Armor
- Arrondissement: Guingamp
- Canton: Callac
- Intercommunality: Guingamp-Paimpol Agglomération

Government
  - Mayor (2020–2026): Joseph Bernard
- Area^{1}: 31.29 km^{2} (12.08 sq mi)
- Highest elevation: 302 m (991 ft)
- Lowest elevation: 223 m (732 ft)
- Population (2023): 362
  - Density: 11.6/km^{2} (30.0/sq mi)
- Time zone: UTC+01:00 (CET)
  - Summer (DST): UTC+02:00 (CEST)
- INSEE/Postal code: 22138 /22160
- ^{1} French Land Register data, which excludes lakes, ponds, glaciers > 1 km^{2} (0.386 sq mi or 247 acres) and river estuaries.

Maël-Pestivien (French pronunciation: [mɛl pɛstivjɛ̃]; Breton: Mael-Pestivien) is a commune in the Côtes-d'Armor department of Brittany in northwestern France.

== Population ==
Historical population
| Year | Pop. | ±% p.a. |
|---|---|---|
| 1968 | 800 | — |
| 1975 | 650 | −2.92% |
| 1982 | 567 | −1.93% |
| 1990 | 514 | −1.22% |
| 1999 | 449 | −1.49% |
| 2007 | 408 | −1.19% |
| 2012 | 402 | −0.30% |
| 2017 | 378 | −1.22% |
| 2023 | 362 | −0.72% |
Source: INSEE

== See also ==
- Communes of the Côtes-d'Armor department
