= À travers Lausanne =

Cycling race in Switzerland

Race details
- Region: Lausanne, Switzerland
- English name: Through Lausanne
- Discipline: Road
- Type: One-day race

History
- First edition: 1940
- Editions: 79
- Final edition: 2001
- First winner: Ferdi Kübler (SWI)
- Most wins: Joop Zoetemelk (NED) (5 wins)
- Final winner: Cadel Evans (AUS)

À travers Lausanne was a professional road cycling race held annually in Lausanne, Switzerland.

The race was originally a one-day hill climb, but in 1968, it was changed to consist of two stages: a time trial and a hill climb.

== Winners ==
| Year | Winner | Second | Third |
|---|---|---|---|
| 1940 | (Switzerland) Ferdi Kübler | (Switzerland) Emile Vaucher | (Switzerland) Robert Lang |
| 1941 | (Switzerland) Ferdi Kübler | (Switzerland) Ernest Kuhn | (Switzerland) Hans Knecht |
| 1942 | (Switzerland) Ferdi Kübler | (Switzerland) Kurt Zaugg | (Switzerland) Alfred Vock |
| 1943 | (Switzerland) Hans Knecht | (Switzerland) Alfred Vock | (Switzerland) Ernest Kuhn |
| 1944 | (Italy) Louis Garzoli | (Switzerland) Gottfried Weilenmann | (Switzerland) Alberto Boffa |
| 1945 | (Switzerland) Ferdi Kübler | (Switzerland) Gottfried Weilenmann | (Italy) Fermo Camellini |
| 1946 | (Italy) Fermo Camellini | (France) Paul Giacomini | (France) Jean de Gribaldy |
| 1947 | (Italy) Fausto Coppi | (Italy) Fermo Camellini | (Switzerland) Fritz Schär |
| 1948 | (France) Jean Robic | (France) Paul Giacomini | (France) Jean de Gribaldy |
| 1949 | (Switzerland) Fritz Schär | (France) Jean de Gribaldy | (France) Lucien Lazaridès |
| 1950–1966 | No race | | |
| 1967 | (France) Raymond Poulidor | (Belgium) Eddy Merckx | (Spain) Julio Jiménez |
| 1968 | (Belgium) Eddy Merckx | (Italy) Felice Gimondi | (France) Raymond Poulidor |
| 1969 | (Belgium) Herman Van Springel | (Belgium) Martin Vandenbossche | (Italy) Franco Bitossi |
| 1970 | (Belgium) Eddy Merckx | (France) Raymond Poulidor | (Italy) Gianni Motta |
| 1971 | (Spain) Luis Ocaña | (Belgium) Eddy Merckx | (Portugal) Joaquim Agostinho |
| 1972 | (Belgium) Eddy Merckx | (France) Bernard Thévenet | (Netherlands) Joop Zoetemelk |
| 1973 | (Belgium) Eddy Merckx | (Italy) Felice Gimondi | (France) Raymond Poulidor |
| 1974 | (Italy) Giuseppe Perletto | (Italy) Felice Gimondi | (Italy) Wladimiro Panizza |
| 1975 | (Netherlands) Joop Zoetemelk | (Belgium) Eddy Merckx | (Italy) Giuseppe Perletto |
| 1976 | (Netherlands) Joop Zoetemelk | (France) Bernard Thévenet | (Switzerland) Willi Lienhard |
| 1977 | (Netherlands) Joop Zoetemelk | (Belgium) Johan De Muynck | (France) Bernard Thévenet |
| 1978 | (Netherlands) Joop Zoetemelk | (France) Bernard Hinault | (Italy) Giuseppe Perletto |
| 1979 | (Netherlands) Joop Zoetemelk | (Switzerland) Gottfried Schmutz | (France) Bernard Hinault |
| 1980 | (Switzerland) Gottfried Schmutz | (Switzerland) Stefan Mutter | (France) Gilbert Duclos-Lassalle |
| 1981–1995 | No race | | |
| 1996 | (Switzerland) Tony Rominger | (Switzerland) Oscar Camenzind | (Switzerland) Laurent Dufaux |
| 1997 | (Switzerland) Laurent Dufaux | (Italy) Marco Pantani | (Switzerland) Beat Zberg |
| 1998 | (Italy) Marco Pantani | (United States) Bobby Julich | (France) Pascal Richard |
| 1999 | (Switzerland) Alex Zülle | (Switzerland) Laurent Dufaux | (Italy) Stefano Garzelli |
| 2000 | (Switzerland) Daniel Schnider | (Switzerland) Oscar Camenzind | (Switzerland) Laurent Dufaux |
| 2001 | (Australia) Cadel Evans | (Spain) José Luis Rubiera | (Switzerland) Laurent Dufaux |
