= 1975 Paris–Nice =

Race details
- Dates: 9–16 March 1975
- Stages: 7 + Prologue
- Distance: 1,318.5 km (819.3 mi)
- Winning time: 34h 32' 27"

Results
Jersey awarded to the overall winner	Winner	Joop Zoetemelk (NED)	(Gan–Mercier–Hutchinson)
	Second	Eddy Merckx (BEL)	(Molteni–RYC)
	Third	Gerrie Knetemann (NED)	(Gan–Mercier–Hutchinson)

The 1975 Paris–Nice was the 33rd edition of the Paris–Nice cycle race and was held from 8 March to 16 March 1975. The race started in Paris and finished in Nice. The race was won by Joop Zoetemelk of the Gan team.

== General classification ==
Final general classification

Rank	Rider	Team	Time
1	Joop Zoetemelk (NED)	Gan–Mercier–Hutchinson	34h 32' 27"
2	Eddy Merckx (BEL)	Molteni–RYC	+ 1' 33"
3	Gerrie Knetemann (NED)	Gan–Mercier–Hutchinson	+ 1' 44"
4	Gianbattista Baronchelli (ITA)	Scic	+ 1' 48"
5	Freddy Maertens (BEL)	Carpenter–Confortluxe–Flandria	+ 2' 07"
6	Dietrich Thurau (FRG)	TI–Raleigh	+ 3' 17"
7	Bernard Hinault (FRA)	Gitane–Campagnolo	+ 4' 08"
8	Joseph Bruyère (BEL)	Molteni–RYC	+ 4' 16"
9	Luis Ocaña (ESP)	Super Ser	+ 4' 30"
10	Sylvain Vasseur (FRA)	Super Ser	+ 4' 58"
