= 1974 Tour de Romandie =

Race details
- Dates: 7–12 May 1974
- Stages: 5 + Prologue
- Distance: 887.6 km (551.5 mi)
- Winning time: 23h 54' 16"

Results
	Winner	Joop Zoetemelk (NED)
	Second	Wladimiro Panizza (ITA)
	Third	Fedor den Hertog (NED)

The 1974 Tour de Romandie was the 28th edition of the Tour de Romandie cycle race and was held from 7 May to 12 May 1974. The race started in Geneva and finished in Grand-Lancy. The race was won by Joop Zoetemelk.

== General classification ==
Final general classification
Rank	Rider	Time
1	Joop Zoetemelk (NED)	23h 54' 16"
2	Wladimiro Panizza (ITA)	+ 5' 03"
3	Fedor den Hertog (NED)	+ 7' 20"
4	Giovanni Battaglin (ITA)	+ 7' 59"
5	Raymond Poulidor (FRA)	+ 8' 41"
6	Gustaaf Van Roosbroeck (BEL)	+ 9' 05"
7	Louis Pfenninger (SUI)	+ 9' 39"
8	Antonio Martos (ESP)	+ 10' 13"
9	Knut Knudsen (NOR)	+ 11' 44"
10	Fausto Bertoglio (ITA)	+ 13' 43"
