= 1970 Tour de Romandie =

Race details
- Dates: 6–10 May 1970
- Stages: 4 + Prologue
- Distance: 697.3 km (433.3 mi)
- Winning time: 18h 48' 31"

Results
	Winner	Gösta Pettersson (SWE)
	Second	Davide Boifava (ITA)
	Third	Joop Zoetemelk (NED)

The 1970 Tour de Romandie was the 24th edition of the Tour de Romandie cycle race and was held from 6 May to 10 May 1970. The race started in Geneva and finished in Lausanne. The race was won by Gösta Pettersson.

== General classification ==
Final general classification
Rank	Rider	Time
1	Gösta Pettersson (SWE)	18h 48' 31"
2	Davide Boifava (ITA)	+ 14"
3	Joop Zoetemelk (NED)	+ 1' 40"
4	Rudi Altig (FRG)	+ 2' 27"
5	Mauro Simonetti (ITA)	+ 2' 40"
6	Roberto Poggiali (ITA)	+ 3' 05"
7	Lucien Van Impe (BEL)	+ 3' 16"
8	Ugo Colombo (ITA)	+ 3' 16"
9	Wladimiro Panizza (ITA)	+ 3' 23"
10	Martin Van Den Bossche (BEL)	+ 3' 39"
