= Bernard Thévenet =

French cyclist

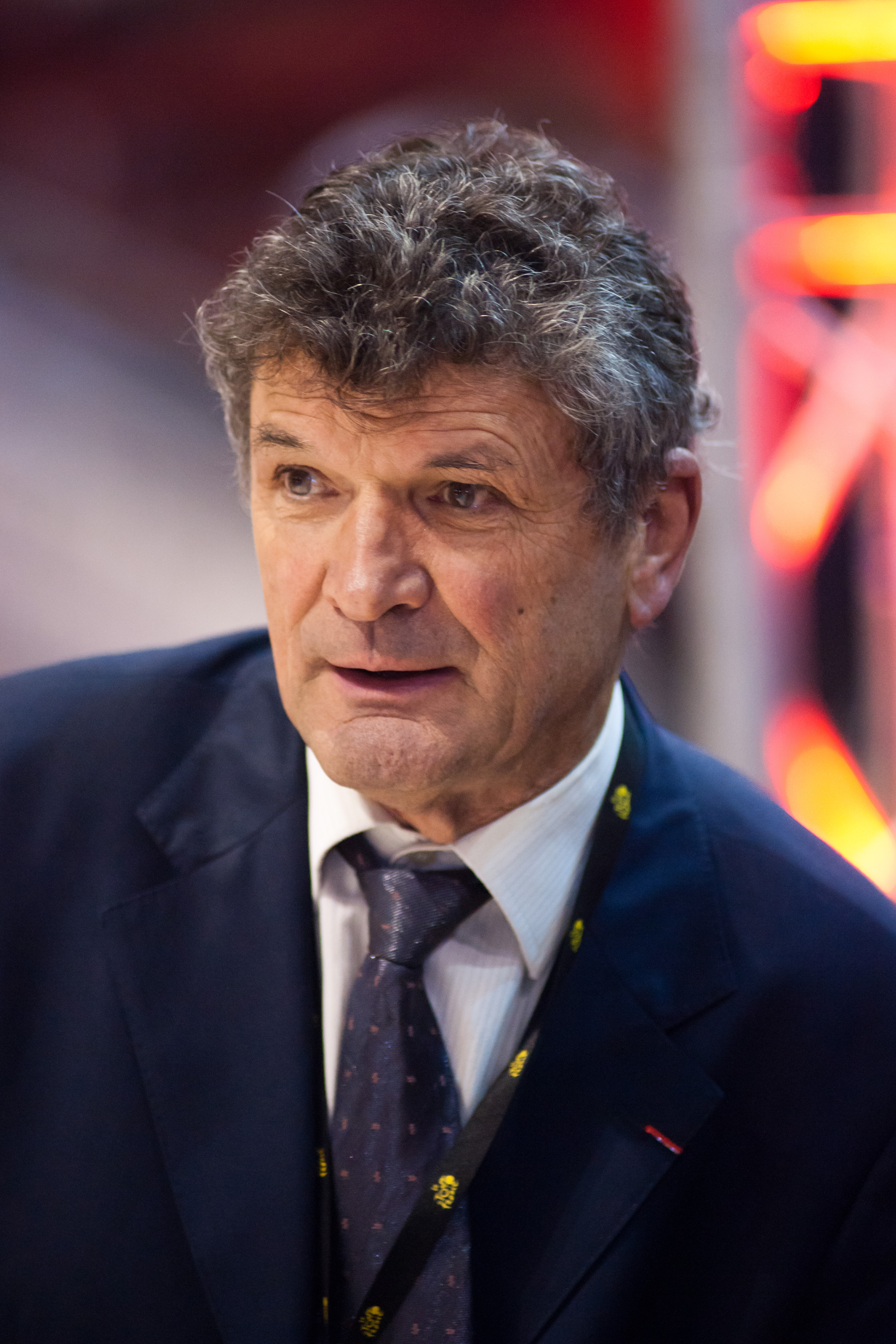
- Thévenet at the 2011 Six Days of Grenoble

Personal information
- Full name: Bernard Thévenet
- Nickname: Nanard
- Born: 10 January 1948 (age 78) Saint-Julien-de-Civry, France

Cycling career
- Sport: Cycling
- Discipline: Road
- Role: Rider
- Rider type: All-rounder

Professional teams
- 1970–1979: Peugeot–BP–Michelin
- 1980: Teka
- 1981: Puch–Wolber–Campagnolo

Major wins
- Grand Tours Tour de France General classification (1975, 1977) 9 individual stages (1970–1973, 1975, 1977) Vuelta a España 1 individual stage (1973) Stage races Tour de Romandie (1972) Volta a Catalunya (1974) Critérium du Dauphiné Libéré (1975, 1976) One-day races and Classics National Road Race Championships (1973)

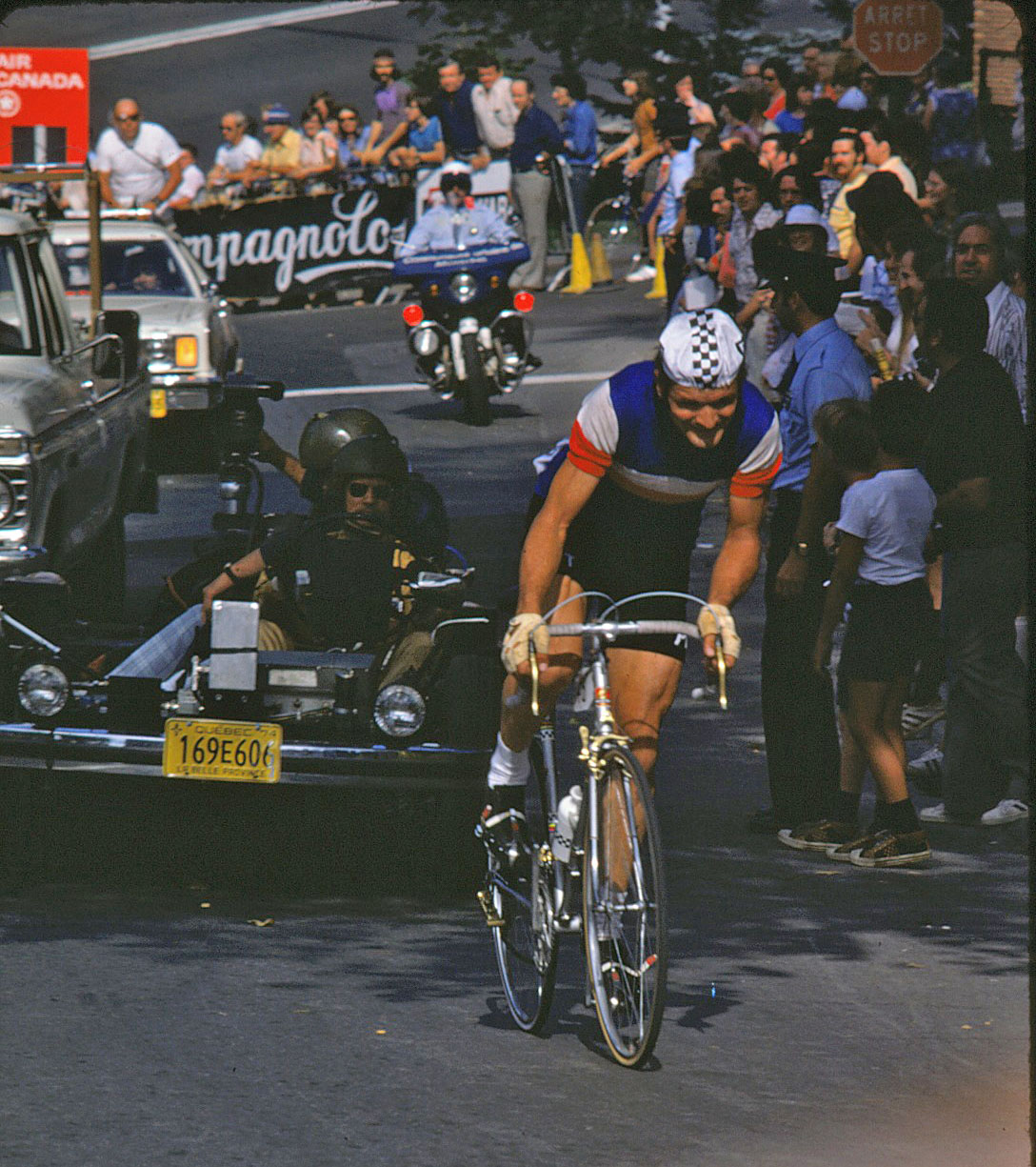
Thévenet in Montreal in 1974

Bernard Thévenet (French pronunciation: [bɛʁ.naʁ te.və.nɛ]; born 10 January 1948) is a retired professional cyclist. His sporting career began with ACBB Paris. He is a two-time winner of the Tour de France and known for ending the reign of five-time Tour champion Eddy Merckx, though both feats are tarnished by Thévenet's later admission of steroids use during his career. He also won the Dauphiné Libéré in 1975 and 1976.

== Origins ==
Thévenet was born to a farming family in Saône-et-Loire in Burgundy and lived in a hamlet called Le Guidon (The Handlebar). It was there in 1961 that he saw the Tour de France for the first time, on a 123 km stage from Nevers to Lyon. At the time Thévenet was a choirboy in the village church. He said: "The priest brought forward the time for Mass so that we could watch the riders go by. The sun was shining on their toe-clips and the chrome on their forks. They were modern-day knights. I had already been dreaming of becoming a racing cyclist and that magical sight convinced me definitively. It was never that magical when I was actually in the peloton of the Tour!"

From the age of six he went to school on the rack of his sister's bike. He got his own bike a year later and pedalled the 10 km round journey himself. His first adult bike, not a racing machine but a sporty cross between a racer and a touring bike, came as a present for passing school examinations at 14. His parents needed him on the farm too much to be keen on his racing, but they knew their son's ambitions. Thévenet rode his first race and his parents found out only when they read the local paper. There was a row and the club president intervened by inviting the parents to see their son's next race. Thévenet won it.

He was champion of Burgundy in 1965 and 1966 and French junior champion in 1968. In 1967 the manager of the ACBB club in Boulogne-Billancourt Mickey Weigant, drove to his house to enrol him. The ACBB was an accepted development team for professionalism, particularly for the Peugeot team. During 1968, he rode for the amateur team of Jean de Gribaldy, Cafés Ravis-Wolhauser-de Gribaldy, which won the amateur Route de France. After that Thévenet did his military service in 1969.

== Professional career ==
He turned professional with Peugeot-BP-Michelin in 1970. He rode the Tour de France for the first time in 1970, as a last-minute stand-in. He said: "I wasn't even a reserve in 1970 but, because two riders in the team had fallen ill at Peugeot, the directeur sportif picked me two days before the start." Gaston Plaud had to call a neighbour in the village because neither Thévenet's nor many other families had telephones. Thévenet had left to train with a friend, Michel Rameau, and his mother got a message to him at Rameau's house.

Thévenet asked the advice of Victor Ferrari, a friend who rode the Tour in 1929. Thévenet said: "He was probably afraid that I'd hesitate and he said: 'You're not going to say No, are you crazy? Go on, go...'" Thévenet remembered:

I can remember perfectly getting to Limoges [for the start]. I was anxious and scared at the same time, but full of pride. I was given a new suitcase, seven jerseys, six pairs of shorts, overclothes, sweaters, shirts and so on and so on. Everyone else had a brand new bike, but not me, because I wasn't on the team's entry list.

Thévenet won a mountain stage ending at the ski resort of La Mongie, most of the way up the Tourmalet in the Pyrenees. He said: "That evening, it was all clear [j'ai compris bien des choses]. That I'd saved my season and, because of that, my job, because the obligatory two-year contracts for new professionals didn't exist then."

In the 1972 Tour he crashed badly on a descent and was temporarily amnesic. As he began to regain his memory, he looked down at his own Peugeot jersey and wondered whether he might be a cyclist. On recognizing the team car, he exclaimed: "I'm riding the Tour de France!"

He refused to abandon the race and four days later won a stage over Mont Ventoux. In the 1973 Tour, he finished second, behind Luis Ocaña, but in 1974 he was forced to abandon the Tour on Stage 11 due to illness.

In the 1975 Tour, Thévenet attacked Eddy Merckx on the col d'Izoard on 14 July, France's national day. Merckx, who was suffering stomach pain from a punch by a spectator, fought back but lost the lead and never regained it. Pierre Chany wrote:

Those who were there will be slow to forget Bernard Thévenet's six successive attacks in the never-ending climb of the col des Champs, Eddy Merckx's immediate and superb response, the alarming chase by the Frenchman after a puncture delayed him on the descent of the col, the Belgian's attack on the way to the summit of the Allos, his breath-taking plunge towards the Pra-Loup valley, his sudden weakening four kilometres from the top and, to finish, Thévenet's furious push. The end of the race was frenetic. Has Eddy Merckx's long reign in the Tour de France come to an end on the Pra-Loup. Some think so; others believe that it will happen tomorrow.

A British writer, Graeme Fife, wrote:

Thévenet caught Merckx, by now almost delirious, 3km from the finish and rode by. The pictures show Merckx's face torn with anguish, eyes hollow, body slumped, arms locked shut on the bars, shoulders a clenched ridge of exertion and distress. Thévenet, mouth gaping to gulp more oxygen, looks pretty well at the limit, too, but his effort is gaining; he's out of the saddle, eyes fixed on the road. He said he could see that one side of the road had turned to liquid tar in the baking heat and Merckx was tyre-deep in it.

Beside the road, a woman in a bikini waved a sign that said: "Merckx is beaten. The Bastille has fallen." Thévenet - who had taken the climb on the larger chainring - went on to win the Tour, which that year finished on the Champs-Élysées for the first time. Merckx finished second, three minutes behind.

Thévenet won his second and last Tour in 1977. That winter he was hospitalized with a liver ailment he attributed to long-term use of steroids. Several months later Thévenet lined up for the 1978 Tour de France but had to abandon the second mountain stage in an ambulance. He left the Peugeot cycling team after 1979 and signed for the Spanish team Teka, where he won two races and a six days race with the Australian rider Danny Clark.

He returned to a French team in his final year, 1981, where he won a stage in the Circuit de la Sarthe.

== Doping ==
Thévenet said "I have never taken drugs; they wouldn't be any use." However, he was caught taking drugs, in the 1977 Paris–Nice.

His 1978 season was a shadow of his years of winning the Tour de France. He had trouble finishing even minor races. When a journalist at the radio station France Inter wondered aloud if Thévenet's repeated poor performances might be due to doping, Thévenet and his team-mates refused to talk to the station.

Thévenet went to hospital, where tests showed serious trouble with his adrenal glands. He admitted taking steroids and called for an end to drugs in the sport. "I was doped by cortisone for three years and there were many like me," he told Pierre Chany in Vélo-France. The steroids had been prescribed to him by François Bellocq, the Peugeot doctor, who had qualified only in 1976. Thévenet told Chany:

We were all convinced we were doing the right thing [être dans le vrai] and we were certain we were a step ahead of the rest so far as what we were doing to prepare for competition. The young doctor with our team had taken the time to explain to us how the body reacted to effort, which nobody had done before him. His words convinced us of his competence, and maybe we were overconfident, but I had the feeling that he was taking us out of the continual experimentation [l'empirisme habituel] to get us on a more methodical and scientific road. From then on, everything that was said around us seemed to come from ignorance, jealousy or malveillance. I was at ease with myself, satisfied deep down that I was doing my job seriously. That was how it was from 1975 until just recently.

== Retirement ==
Thévenet became directeur sportif in 1984 of the La Redoute team of Stephen Roche, then of RMO in 1986 and 1987. He became a television commentator and opened a company selling cycling clothes bearing his name. He was asked whether it was hard being a racing cyclist; his reply was that being a French farmer was harder.

Thévenet became race director of the Critérium du Dauphiné in 2010 after the organisation of the race was taken over by the Amaury Sport Organisation.

== Honour ==
Thévenet was made a Chevalier de la Légion d'honneur on 14 July 2001.

== Major results ==
1968
7th Overall Tour de l'Avenir
1969
1st Stage 8 Tour de l'Avenir
1970
1st Mont Faron Hill Climb
1st Stage 18 Tour de France
9th Overall À travers Lausanne
1971
2nd Overall Étoile des Espoirs

1st Stage 2 (ITT)

3rd Overall Critérium du Dauphiné Libéré
3rd Trofeo Baracchi (with Roger Pingeon)
4th Overall Tour de France

1st Stage 10

6th Overall À travers Lausanne
6th Critérium National de la Route
1972
1st Overall Tour de Romandie

1st Prologue & Stage 3b (ITT)

1st Overall Tour d'Indre-et-Loire

1st Stage 1

2nd Overall Critérium du Dauphiné Libéré

1st Prologue (TTT)

2nd Overall À travers Lausanne
2nd Critérium des As
5th Grand Prix des Nations
6th Trofeo Baracchi (with Jean-Pierre Danguillaume)
7th Critérium National de la Route
8th Overall Grand Prix du Midi Libre

1st Stage 3

8th Overall Escalada a Montjuïc
9th Overall Tour de France

1st Stages 11 & 17

1973
1st Road race, National Road Championships
2nd Overall Tour de France

1st Stages 7b & 20b

2nd Overall Critérium du Dauphiné Libéré

1st Stage 3

2nd Circuit de l'Aulne
3rd Overall Vuelta a España

1st Stage 11

3rd Overall Tour de l'Aude

1st Stage 1

4th Grand Prix des Nations
5th Overall À travers Lausanne
6th Liège–Bastogne–Liège
7th Overall Escalada a Montjuïc
9th Overall Grand Prix du Midi Libre

1st Stage 4

1974
1st Overall Volta a Catalunya

1st Stage 4 & 7b (ITT)

1st Critérium National de la Route
4th Overall Paris–Nice

1st Stage 2

5th Road race, UCI Road World Championships
6th Giro di Lombardia
6th Grand Prix des Nations
7th Gran Premio di Lugano
9th Circuit de l'Aulne
Vuelta a España

Held after Stages 2 & 3

1975
1st Overall Tour de France

1st Stage 15 & 16

1st Overall Critérium du Dauphiné Libéré

1st Stage 5

1st Stage 4a (ITT) Paris–Nice
1st Stage 2 (ITT) À travers Lausanne
2nd Liège–Bastogne–Liège
3rd Overall Four Days of Dunkirk
3rd Paris–Camembert
3rd Grand Prix des Nations
4th Overall Escalada a Montjuïc
4th Bruxelles–Meulebeke
5th Critérium des As
6th Road race, UCI Road World Championships
1976
1st Overall Critérium du Dauphiné Libéré

1st Stages 4 & 5

1st Stage 5a Four Days of Dunkirk
1st Stage 2 Tour du Limousin
2nd Overall Étoile des Espoirs
2nd Overall À travers Lausanne
2nd Giro di Lombardia
2nd Circuit de l'Aulne
4th Tour du Haut Var
5th Overall Grand Prix du Midi Libre
5th Overall Escalada a Montjuïc
5th Grand Prix des Nations
5th Trofeo Baracchi (with Jean-Luc Vandenbroucke)
6th Grand Prix de Monaco
1977
1st Overall Tour de France

1st Stage 20 (ITT)

1st Overall Escalada a Montjuïc

1st Stages Stages 1b & 1c (ITT)

1st Tour du Haut Var
1st Circuit du Cher
1st Maël-Pestivien
2nd Overall Critérium du Dauphiné Libéré

1st Stage 7b (ITT)

2nd Overall Grand Prix du Midi Libre
3rd Overall À travers Lausanne
5th Critérium des As
9th Grand Prix des Nations
1980
1st La Poly Normande
8th Overall Critérium du Dauphiné Libéré
8th Overall Vuelta a Andalucía
10th Tour du Haut Var
1981
1st Critérium Professionnel de Châteauroux
1st Stage 4a (ITT) Circuit de la Sarthe-Pays de la Loire
2nd Overall Tour du Vaucluse

1st Stage 1

=== Grand Tours general classification results timeline ===
| Grand Tour | 1970 | 1971 | 1972 | 1973 | 1974 | 1975 | 1976 | 1977 | 1978 | 1979 | 1980 | 1981 |
|---|---|---|---|---|---|---|---|---|---|---|---|---|
| Vuelta a España | — | 44 | — | 3 | DNF | — | — | — | — | — | 14 | — |
| Giro d'Italia | — | — | — | — | — | — | — | — | — | 31 | — | — |
| Tour de France | 35 | 4 | 9 | 2 | DNF | 1 | DNF | 1 | DNF | — | 17 | 37 |

Legend
| — | Did not compete |
| DNF | Did not finish |

== See also ==
- List of doping cases in cycling
