= Jean-Pierre Danguillaume =

French cyclist

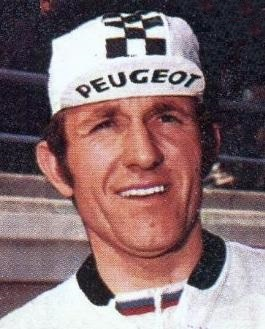

Personal information
- Full name: Jean-Pierre Danguillaume
- Born: 25 May 1946 (age 80) Joué-lès-Tours, France

Cycling career
- Sport: Cycling
- Discipline: Road
- Role: Rider

Professional team
- 1970–1978: Peugeot–BP–Michelin

Major wins
- 7 stages Tour de France
Medal record
Men's road bicycle racing
Representing France
UCI Road World Championships
Bronze medal – third place	1975 Yvoirl	Elite Men's Road Race

Jean-Pierre Danguillaume (born 25 May 1946) is a retired French professional road bicycle racer. He is the nephew of fellow racing cyclist Camille Danguillaume. His sporting career began with U.C. Joue. As an amateur, he competed in the team time trial at the 1968 Summer Olympics and won the 1969 edition of the Peace Race. In 1970 he turned professional with the Peugeot team, where he spent his entire professional career. Between 1970 and 1978, Danguillaume won 7 stages in the Tour de France. His other notable wins included the Grand Prix de Plouay in 1971, the Critérium International in 1973, the Grand Prix du Midi Libre in 1974 and Paris–Bourges in 1975. In the latter year he also took the bronze medal in the road race at the World Championships in Yvoir, Belgium. During his career he took a total of 350 wins, including 68 as a professional. After his retirement at the end of 1978, he became a directeur sportif, managing the Mercier team from 1979 to 1984. After the team was disbanded, he joined Coca-Cola Enterprises as an executive, managing the company's presence at the Tour de France as a sponsor: he remained in this role for 19 years, retiring at the end of 2003. He continued to work at the Tour in a hospitality role.

== Major results ==
1969
Peace Race
1970
Tour de France:

Winner stage 22

1971
GP Ouest-France
Tour de France:

Winner stage 18

1972
Auzances
Beaulac-Bernos
Meymac
Ploërdut
Roquebrune
Trophée des Grimpeurs
1973
Boulogne-sur-Mer
Circuit de Boulogne
Critérium International
Plancoët
Route Nivernaise
Tour de France:

Winner stage 6

Vailly-sur-Sauldre
1974
Bagneux
La Ferté-Bernard
Lannion
Montceau-les-Mines
Oradour-sur-Glane
Grand Prix du Midi Libre
Tour de France:

Winner stages 17 and 18

Ussel
Pogny
1975
GP de Cannes
Landivisiau
Paris–Bourges
Plaintel
Rochecorbon
Villers-Cotterets
1976
Châteauroux – Classic de l'Indre
Ergué-Gabéric
Quilan
Vendôme
1977
Beaulac-Bernos
Tour de France:

Winner stages 11 and 13B

Saint-Macaire en Mauges
Tour de l'Aude
1978
Ile-sur-Tet
Nogent-sur-Oise
