= Gitane–Campagnolo =

French cycling team

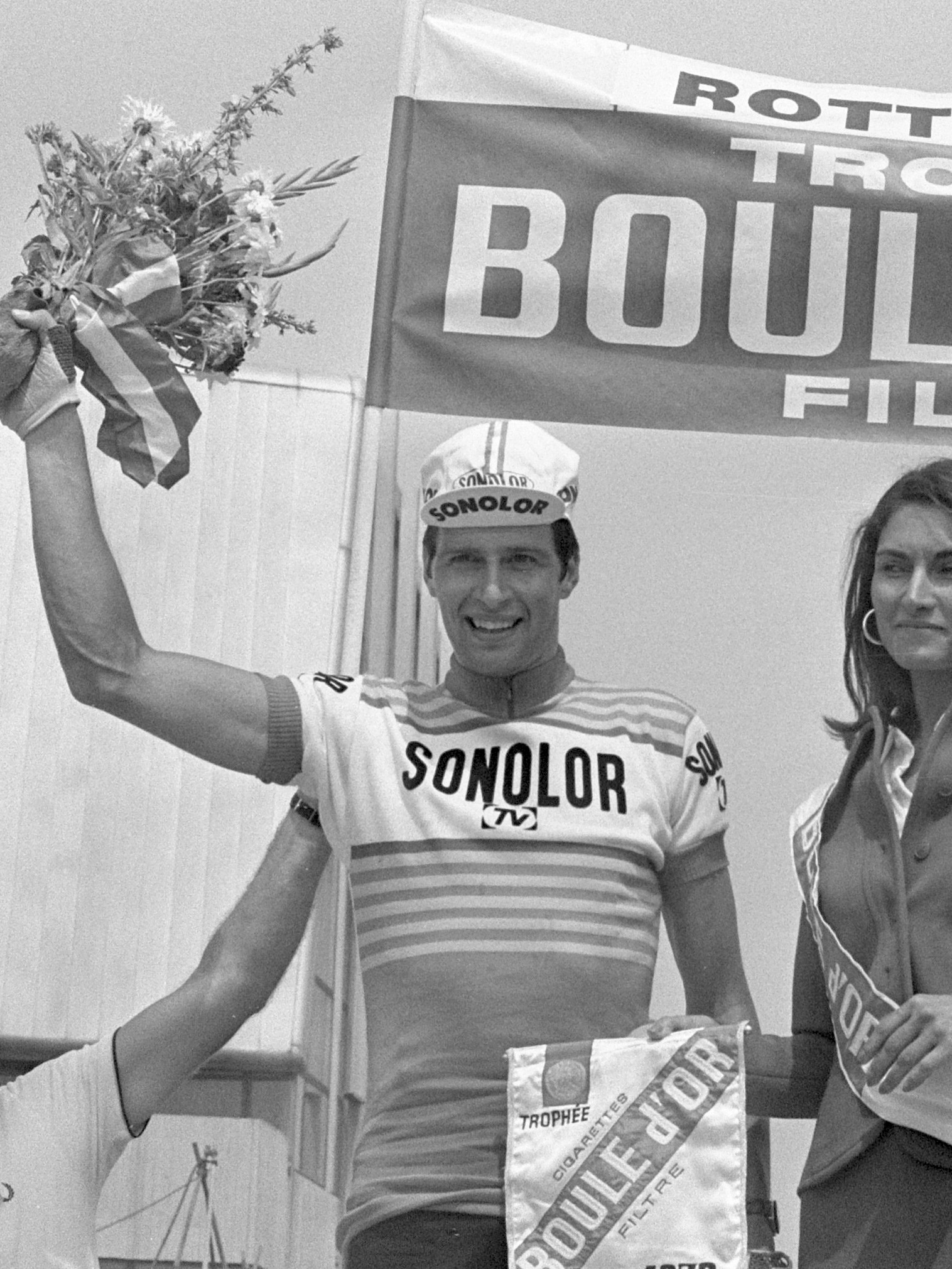
- Willy Teirlinck in 1973

Team information
- Registered: France
- Founded: 1969
- Disbanded: 1977
- Disciplines: Road; Cyclo-cross

Team name history
- 1969–1972 1973 1974 1975–1977: Sonolor–Lejeune; Sonolor; Sonolor–Gitane; Gitane–Campagnolo

Gitane–Campagnolo was a French professional cycling team that existed from 1969 to 1977. Its main sponsor was the French bicycle manufacturer Gitane.

== History ==
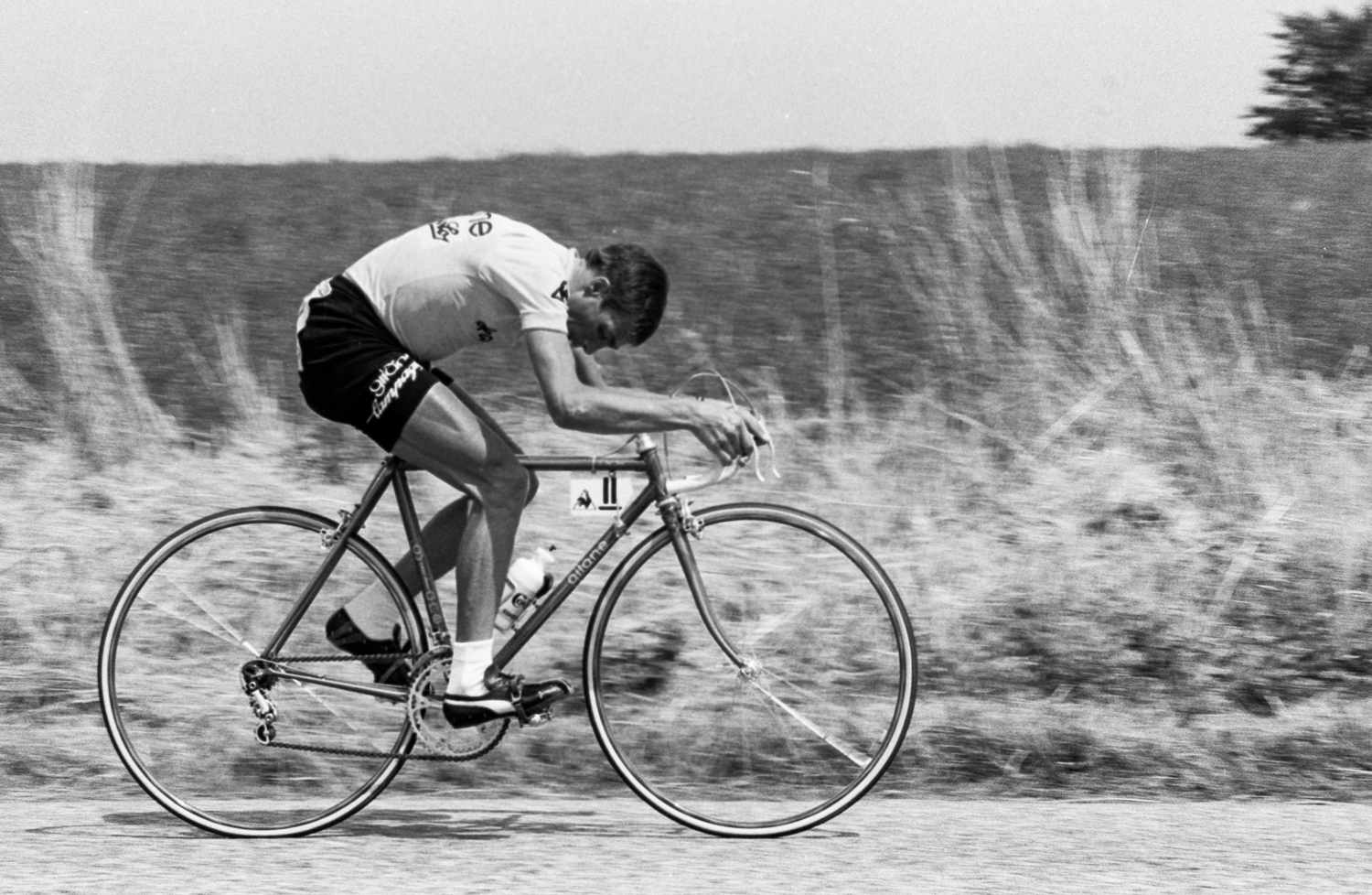
Lucien Van Impe won the overall yellow jersey of the 1976 Tour de France

The Sonolor team was created for the 1969 season after the Pelforth–Sauvage–Lejeune team ended in 1968. In 1974, the Gitane–Frigécrème team of directeur sportif Andre Desvrages was merged into the team creating Sonolor–Gitane. The team was called Gitane–Campagnolo from 1975–1977 and in 1975 signed 1971 French amateur champion Bernard Hinault. During this time the team was directed by Stablinski, but Cyrille Guimard was becoming involved as well as Maurice Champion.

Guimard took over as main directeur sportif in 1976 and directed Van Impe to success in the 1976 Tour de France. Van Impe left at the end of 1976 and Hinault was designated captain for stage races. Even though Hinault won the Critérium du Dauphiné Libéré in 1977 in front of Bernard Thévenet and Lucien Van Impe, he did not start the Tour de France.

After Renault auto group purchased Gitane, Renault became the main sponsor of the team making the Renault–Elf–Gitane team.

== Major wins ==
- Tour de France General classification 1976
- Australian National Road Race Championships 1976
- Belgian National Road Race Championships 1975
- French National Cyclo Cross Championships 1976
- Dutch National Road Race Championships 1973
- Liège–Bastogne–Liège 1977
- Gent–Wevelgem 1977
- GP Ouest-France 1973, 1974, 1976, 1977
- Critérium du Dauphiné Libéré General classification 1977
- Circuit Cycliste de la Sarthe 1975
- Paris–Camembert 1975, 1976
- Grand Prix de Denain 1974, 1977
- Grand Prix de Fourmies 1974
- Critérium International 1977
