= Jacques Boyer =

American cyclist (born 1955)

Personal information
- Full name: Jonathan Boyer
- Born: 8 October 1955 (age 71) Moab, Utah, United States

Cycling career
- Sport: Cycling
- Discipline: Road
- Role: Rider

Professional teams
- 1977–1978: Lejeune–BP
- 1979: Grab On
- 1980: Puch–Sem–Campagnolo
- 1981: Renault–Elf
- 1982–1983: Sem–France Loire
- 1984: Supermercati Brianzoli–Chateau d'Ax
- 1984: Skil–Sem–Mavic–Reydel
- 1985–1987: 7-Eleven

Major wins
- Tour de Suisse 1 stage (1984)

Jonathan Boyer (born October 8, 1955), nicknamed "Jock" and "Jacques", is an American former professional cyclist who, in 1981, became the first American to participate in the Tour de France. In November 2002, Boyer pled guilty to seven counts of child molestation and three counts of genital penetration of an underage girl. After his release from jail, Boyer resumed competitive racing and worked with charitable organizations in Africa.

== Early life and racing career ==
Boyer grew up in Monterey, California and was a member of the Velo Club Monterey there. He raced as an amateur in Europe from 1973, after joining the ACBB club in the Parisian suburb of Boulogne-Billancourt. The club frequently provided riders for the Peugeot professional team, which had had English-speaking riders since the Briton, Tom Simpson, led it in the 1960s. Boyer, however, turned professional in 1977 for the smaller Lejeune–BP team, sponsored by a Parisian cycle company and an international oil giant. He first competed in the Tour in 1981, when the organiser, Félix Lévitan, encouraged him to wear not his team jersey but a Stars and Stripes design which suggested that he was the American national champion. Many have said that Lévitan, who looked after the financial aspects of the race while his colleague Jacques Goddet managed the sporting side, saw Boyer as a way to attract further American interest and money.

Boyer rode the Tour de France five times and finished 12th in 1983. He was unusual in refusing to eat meat and became well known for the large quantities of nuts and fruit that he brought to the race. The French team manager, Cyrille Guimard, described Boyer as "un marginal", a description hard to translate but which suggests an outsider, almost a hippie.

The British journalist Dennis Donovan, working for the London magazine Cycling remarked on Boyer's intense religious beliefs. In the 1981 Tour, he said, English-speaking journalists felt sorry for him as a colleague in a French-speaking world and offered him a collection of girlie magazines. Boyer, said Donovan, declined politely and said he preferred to read his Bible.

Boyer also competed in and won the 1980 Coors Classic in the US, and the 1985 Race Across America completing the 3,120 miles in nine days, two hours, and six minutes. His career included 87 amateur victories and 49 professional ones.

Boyer was inducted into the United States Cycling Hall of Fame in 1998. He was expelled from the Hall in 2016 for "ethical issues".

== Criminal conviction ==
In November 2002, Boyer pled guilty to seven counts of child molestation and three counts of genital penetration, which began when the victim was eleven and continued for at least three years. He was sentenced to a 20-year prison term, which was suspended by the judge pending the successful completion of one year in jail and five years probation.

== Post-conviction life ==
In 2006, Boyer participated in the Race Across America again, this time in the new "Solo Enduro" category which requires all participants to use 40 hours of rest (stopping) during the race at official stations along the course. Early in the race Boyer showed he was using a different strategy from other favorites. While the two ahead of him were using minimal rests (30 minutes and 2½ hours after the first 36 hours of racing), Boyer had already used 5½ hour of off-bike time. In the end, all Enduro contenders used their required 40 hours' off-bike time well before the finish, where Boyer prevailed in the Enduro division.

Since 2007 Boyer has lived much of the year in Rwanda where he runs Team Rwanda, a cycling team for Rwandan cyclists, and assists with Project Rwanda, a relief agency focused on providing bicycles and other aid to people in Rwanda.

In 2009 Boyer completed a motorcycle journey from South Africa to Rwanda on a BMW motorcycle.

In 2014, Team Rwanda moved to a new complex only a few kilometers from the Gorilla Park Headquarters in Kinigi, Rwanda. The center is called Africa Rising Cycling Center. The program has expanded to include BMX, Junior Road and MTB, Elite MTB and Women Road and MTB.

Boyer returned to Wyoming in 2017, but remained as an executive director of Team Africa Rising.

In late 2019, Boyer published an open letter listing alleged misconduct within the Rwandan cycling federation, which resulted in the resignation of the federation president and his entire executive team.

== Major results ==
1977
3rd Châteauroux Classic
4th GP du canton d'Argovie
8th GP Ouest–France
1979
2nd Overall Coors Classic
1980
1st Overall Coors Classic
5th Road race, UCI Road World Championships
1982
2nd Druivenkoers Overijse
1983
9th Overall Tour de l'Avenir

1st Stage 6a

5th La Flèche Wallonne
1984
1st Stage 6 Tour de Suisse
9th Trofeo Pantalica

== See also ==
- Jean de Gribaldy, directeur sportif
- Rising from Ashes
