= 1981 Critérium du Dauphiné Libéré =

Race details
- Dates: 26 May – 2 June 1981
- Stages: 7 + Prologue
- Distance: 1,287.5 km (800.0 mi)
- Winning time: 36h 22' 38"

Results
Jersey awarded to the overall winner	Winner	Bernard Hinault (FRA)	(Renault–Elf–Gitane)
	Second	Joaquim Agostinho (POR)	(Sem–France Loire–Campagnolo)
	Third	Greg LeMond (USA)	(Renault–Elf–Gitane)
Jersey awarded to the points classification winner	Points	Bernard Hinault (FRA)	(Renault–Elf–Gitane)
Jersey awarded to the mountains classification winner	Mountains	Bernard Hinault (FRA)	(Renault–Elf–Gitane)

The 1981 Critérium du Dauphiné Libéré was the 33rd edition of the cycle race and was held from 26 May to 2 June 1981. The race started in Grenoble and finished in Avignon. The race was won by Bernard Hinault of the Renault team.

== Teams ==
Ten teams, containing a total of 99 riders, participated in the race:

- TI–Raleigh–Creda
- Renault–Elf–Gitane
- Peugeot–Esso–Michelin
- DAF Trucks–Côte d'Or
- Puch–Wolber–Campagnolo
- Splendor–Wickes Bouwmarkt–Europ Decor
- Teka–Campagnolo
- Sem–France Loire–Campagnolo
- La Redoute–Motobécane
- Miko–Mercier–Vivagel

== Route ==
Stage characteristics and winners
Stage	Date	Course	Distance	Type	Winner
P	26 May	Grenoble	3 km (1.9 mi)	Individual time trial	Johan van der Velde (NED)
1	27 May	Grenoble to Saint-Étienne	207 km (129 mi)		Adri van der Poel (NED)
2	28 May	Saint-Étienne to Montceau-les-Mines	215.5 km (133.9 mi)		Sean Kelly (IRL)
3a	29 May	Montceau-les-Mines to Mâcon	102 km (63 mi)		William Tackaert (BEL)
3b	29 May	Mâcon to Bourg-en-Bresse	40 km (25 mi)	Individual time trial	Bert Oosterbosch (NED)
4	30 May	Lyon to Lyon	207.5 km (128.9 mi)		Bernard Hinault (FRA)
5	31 May	Lyon to Chambéry	180 km (110 mi)		Bernard Hinault (FRA)
6	1 June	Chambéry to Chambéry	134.5 km (83.6 mi)		Bernard Hinault (FRA)
7	2 June	Valence to Avignon	198 km (123 mi)		Bernard Hinault (FRA)

== General classification ==
Final general classification

Rank	Rider	Team	Time
1	Bernard Hinault (FRA)	Renault–Elf–Gitane	36h 22' 38"
2	Joaquim Agostinho (POR)	Sem–France Loire–Campagnolo	+ 12' 07"
3	Greg LeMond (USA)	Renault–Elf–Gitane	+ 13' 05"
4	Christian Seznec (FRA)	Miko–Mercier–Vivagel	+ 14' 17"
5	Eddy Schepers (BEL)	DAF Trucks–Côte d'Or	+ 14' 30"
6	Robert Millar (GBR)	Peugeot–Esso–Michelin	+ 14' 57"
7	Michel Laurent (FRA)	Peugeot–Esso–Michelin	+ 14' 58"
8	Philippe Martinez (FRA)	Peugeot–Esso–Michelin	+ 16' 30"
9	Manuel Esparza (ESP)	Teka–Campagnolo	+ 18' 35"
10	Robert Alban (FRA)	La Redoute–Motobécane	+ 18' 36"
