= Bernard Hinault =

French cyclist (born 1954)

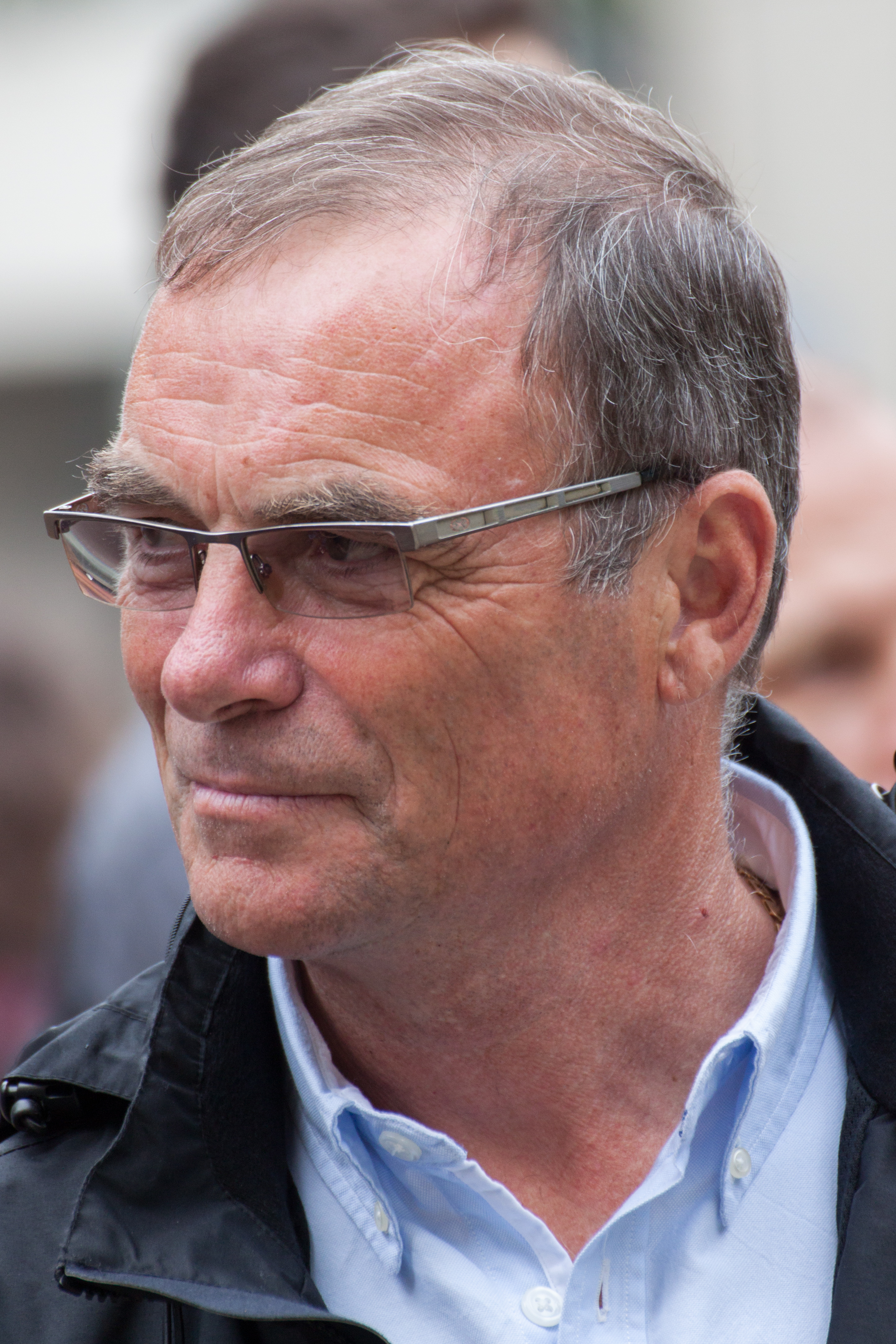
- Hinault at the 2012 Critérium du Dauphiné

Personal information
- Full name: Bernard Hinault
- Nicknames: Le Blaireau (The Badger); Le Patron (The Boss)
- Born: 14 November 1954 (age 72) Yffiniac, France
- Height: 1.74 m (5 ft 8 1/2 in)
- Weight: 62 kg (137 lb; 9 st 11 lb)

Cycling career
- Sport: Cycling
- Discipline: Road
- Role: Rider
- Rider type: All-rounder

Professional teams
- 1975–1977: Gitane–Campagnolo
- 1978–1983: Renault–Gitane–Campagnolo
- 1984–1986: La Vie Claire

Major wins
- Grand Tours Tour de France General classification (1978, 1979, 1981, 1982, 1985) Points classification (1979) Mountains classification (1986) Combination classification (1981, 1982) 28 individual stages (1978–1986) 1 TTT stage (1985) Combativity award (1981, 1984, 1986) Giro d'Italia General classification (1980, 1982, 1985) 6 individual stages (1980, 1982, 1985) 1 TTT stage (1982) Vuelta a España General classification (1978, 1983) 7 individual stages (1978, 1983) Stage races Critérium du Dauphiné Libéré (1977, 1979, 1981) Tour de Romandie (1980) One-day races and Classics World Road Race Championships (1980) National Road Race Championships (1978) Liège–Bastogne–Liège (1977, 1980) Giro di Lombardia (1979, 1984) Paris–Roubaix (1981) Gent–Wevelgem (1977) La Flèche Wallonne (1979, 1983) Amstel Gold Race (1981) Other Super Prestige Pernod International (1979–1982)
Medal record
Representing France
Men's road bicycle racing
World Championships
Gold medal – first place	1980 Sallanches	Road race
Bronze medal – third place	1981 Prague	Road race

Bernard Hinault (pronounced [bɛʁ.naʁ i.no]; born 14 November 1954) is a French former professional road cyclist. With 147 professional victories, including five times the Tour de France, he is often named among the greatest cyclists of all time. In his career, Hinault entered a total of thirteen Grand Tours. He abandoned one of them while in the lead, finished in 2nd place on two occasions and won the other ten, putting him one behind Merckx for the all-time record. No rider since Hinault has achieved more than seven.

Hinault started cycling as an amateur in his native Brittany. After a successful amateur career, he signed with the Gitane–Campagnolo team to turn professional in 1975. He took breakthrough victories at both the Liège–Bastogne–Liège classic and the Critérium du Dauphiné Libéré stage race in 1977. In 1978, he won his first two Grand Tours: the Vuelta a España and the Tour de France. In the following years, he was the most successful professional cyclist, adding another Tour victory in 1979 and a win at the 1980 Giro d'Italia. Although a knee injury forced him to quit the 1980 Tour de France while in the lead, he returned to win the World Championship road race later in the year. He added another Tour victory in 1981, before completing his first Giro-Tour double in 1982.

After winning the 1983 Vuelta a España, a return of his knee problems forced him to miss that year's Tour de France, won by his teammate Laurent Fignon. Conflict within the Renault team led to his leaving and joining La Vie Claire. With his new team, he raced the 1984 Tour de France, but lost to Fignon by over ten minutes. He recovered the following year, winning another Giro-Tour double with the help of teammate Greg LeMond. In the 1986 Tour de France, he engaged in an intra-team rivalry with LeMond, who won his first of three Tours. Hinault retired at the end of the season. As of 2025 he is the most recent French winner of the men’s Tour de France. After his cycling career, Hinault turned to farming, while fulfilling enforcement duties for the organisers of the Tour de France until 2016.

All through his career, Hinault was known by the nickname Le Blaireau ("The Badger"); he associated himself with the animal due to its aggressive nature, a trait he embodied on the bike. Within the peloton, Hinault assumed the role of patron, exercising authority over races he took part in.

== Early life and family ==
Hinault was born on 14 November 1954 in the Breton village of Yffiniac, the second oldest of four children to Joseph and Lucie Hinault. The family lived in a cottage named La Clôture, built shortly after Hinault was born. His parents were farmers, and the children often had to help out at harvest time. His father later worked as a platelayer for the national rail company SNCF. Hinault was described as a "hyperactive" child, with his mother nicknaming him "little hooligan". Hinault was not a good student, but visited the technical college in Saint-Brieuc for an engineering apprenticeship. He started athletics there, becoming a runner and finishing tenth in the French junior cross-country championship in 1971.

In December 1974, just before turning professional, Hinault married Martine, who he had met at a family wedding the year before. Their first son, Mickael, was born in 1975, with a second, Alexandre, in 1981. Hinault and his family lived in Quessoy, close to Yffiniac, while he was a professional cyclist. After his retirement, they moved to a farm 64 km (40 mi) away in Brittany. Hinault had bought the 48 ha (120 acres) property near Calorguen in 1983. Martine later served as mayor of Calorguen.

Although they share the same birthplace and surname, he is not related to the younger cyclist Sébastien Hinault.

== Amateur career ==
"It seemed natural to him that he had won."
Hinault's mother Lucie speaking about his reaction after his first race.

Hinault came to cycling through his cousin René, who rode weekend races. At first he had to use the shared family bike, which he rode devotedly. He received his own bike when he was 15 as a reward for passing his school examinations, and used it to travel to college. During the summer of 1971 he made training rides with René, who had problems keeping up with the sixteen-year-old Bernard, even though he was an experienced amateur rider. Hinault received his racing licence from Club Olympique Briochin in late April 1971 and entered his first race on 2 May in Planguenoual. Advised only to try to stay with the other riders, Hinault won the event. Hinault won his first five races, amassing twelve wins from twenty races by the end of the year. Also during the summer of 1971, Hinault was at odds with his father about his choice to pursue cycling as a career. Joseph Hinault relented only after his son ran away from home for three days to stay with his cousins, sleeping on straw in the barn.

For 1972, Hinault was allowed to race with the over-18s. At a race in Hillion, he and René escaped from the field and reached the finish alone. They crossed the line together to share the victory, to the dismay of the race organisers. The young Hinault was heavily influenced by his trainer at the Club Olympique Briochin, Robert Le Roux, who had earlier worked with 1965 World Champion Tom Simpson. Hinault won nineteen races in his second season as an amateur, including the national junior championship against opposition a year older than him, such as future professional Bernard Vallet. He was conscripted into the military at age 18, and did not race throughout 1973. He was unable to join the army's training centre for young athletes and instead served in Sissonne with the 21st Marine Infantry Regiment. Returning to competition overweight, Hinault managed to win his first race of 1974. This was his last season as an amateur and again was highly successful, including a victory in his home town of Yffiniac towards the end of the year, where an alliance formed by four other riders was unable to hold him back. He also competed in track cycling, winning the national pursuit championship. On the road, he took part in the Étoile des Espoirs, a race open to amateurs and young professionals. Hinault finished fifth overall, and second on the time trial stage behind reigning pursuit world champion Roy Schuiten. Towards the end of the season, Hinault turned down an offer to race with the prestigious Athletic Club de Boulogne-Billancourt, instead deciding to turn professional in 1975.

== Professional career ==
=== 1975–1977: Gitane ===
In January 1975, Bernard Hinault turned professional with the Gitane–Campagnolo team, run by former World Champion Jean Stablinski, on a lean wage of 2,500 francs per month. The decision to turn professional relatively early was in part taken as, had Hinault raced the 1975 season as an amateur, he would have likely been prevented by the French cycling federation from turning professional before the 1976 Summer Olympics to be part of the French team there. Early on, he showed no interest in adhering to the unwritten rules of the peloton, whereby younger riders were expected to show respect towards older ones. At a criterium race in August 1975 he went up against a coalition of senior riders, who had decided to divide the prize money between them. Hinault won all the intermediate cash prizes until five-time Tour de France winner Eddy Merckx declared that Hinault was included in the pact. His results in his first season were impressive, with a seventh place at Paris–Nice and a victory at the Circuit de la Sarthe, earning him the Promotion Pernod, the prize for the best new professional in France. However, Hinault showed little willingness to learn the basic trades of cycling from Stablinski, often escaping early in the race instead of learning how to ride inside the peloton. Together with Stablinski entering Hinault into too many races, this led to conflicts between them.

For 1976, Hinault stayed with Gitane, as former professional Cyrille Guimard, who had just retired from cycling, took over the team and became directeur sportif. Guimard and Hinault got along well, and the latter was kept out of the high-profile races for 1976, instead focussing on a steady improvement in lesser known races such as Paris–Camembert, which he won. That year, Guimard spurred Lucien Van Impe to his only win in the Tour de France. Hinault's progress was visible, with a second consecutive victory at the Circuit de la Sarthe, a third place at the Grand Prix du Midi Libre and a win at the Tour de l'Aude, ensuring him the Prestige Pernod, the award for the best French rider of the season. In total, Hinault won 15 races in 1976. At the end of the year, he came sixth at the World Championship Road Race, being beaten to the line for fifth by Eddy Merckx.

During the spring classics season of 1977, Hinault left the Tour of Flanders before it had even started, not wanting to risk his health in a rain- and cold-affected race on cobbled roads. This drew him a formal warning by Guimard for his conduct. Three weeks later, Hinault won Gent–Wevelgem in a solo effort after an attack 30 km (19 mi) from the finish. Five days later, at Liège–Bastogne–Liège, Hinault followed an attack by favourite André Dierickx, and beat him in the two-man sprint to take his first victory in one of cycling's "monuments". In accordance with Guimard's plan to build Hinault up slowly, he did not enter the Tour de France. He did however start the Critérium du Dauphiné Libéré, seen as the most important preparation event for the Tour. While in the leader's jersey on the penultimate stage to Grenoble, Hinault attacked up the Col de Porte, leading Van Impe and Bernard Thévenet by 1:30 minutes when crossing the summit. On the descent, he misjudged a hairpin corner and crashed down the mountainside. A tree saved him from falling far down, while his bike was lost. Hinault then climbed back onto the road, took a new bike and without showing any hesitation, continued on. Up the finishing climb in Grenoble, he briefly dismounted, still shocked from the near-death experience and pushed his bike for about 20 m (22 yd), before remounting and winning the stage eighty seconds ahead of Van Impe. This also secured him the overall victory ahead of eventual Tour winner Thévenet.

This incident was mentioned from a semi-pro rider's perspective in the Tim Krabbé book De Renner (The Rider) when the main character is about to descend a Col in the Tour de Mont Aigoual:

Curves. I'm afraid, and for good reason. Only three weeks ago, during the Dauphiné Libéré, the young up-and-coming Hinault flew out of a curve, into a ravine. Gone. At that moment the French TV audience had every reason to assume that he was lying down there with a broken back. Then he climbed up, was given another bike, rode on, won the stage and went on to win the Dauphiné Libéré. A star for ever. Hinault had gone into that ravine a rider, but came out a vedette, and the entire operation lasted no longer than fifteen seconds."

At the end of the season, Hinault won the Grand Prix des Nations, an individual time trial, with a substantial margin of 3:15 minutes ahead of favourite Joop Zoetemelk.

=== 1978–1983: Renault ===
==== 1978: Grand Tour breakthrough ====
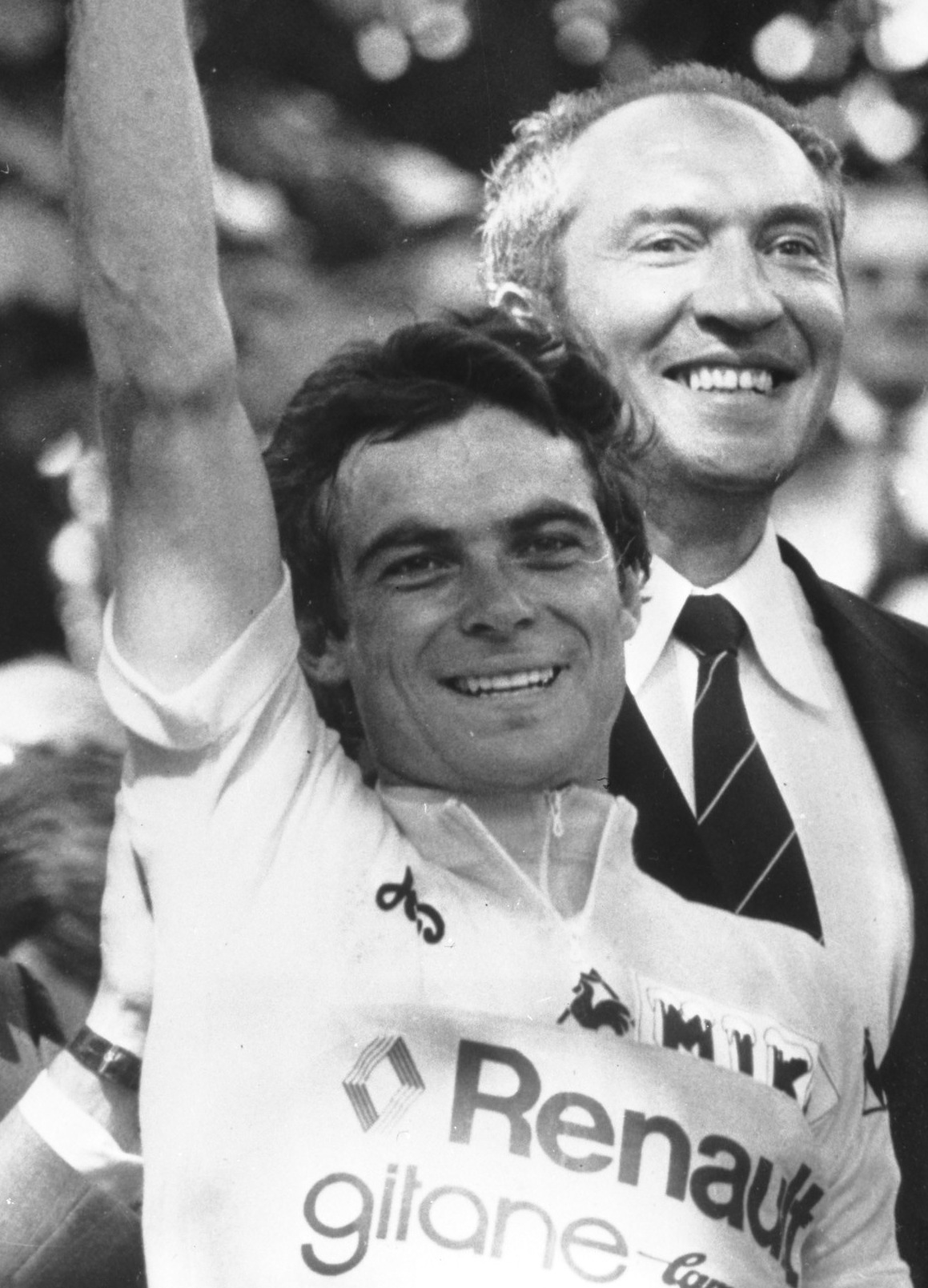
Hinault at the 1978 Tour de France

At the beginning of 1978, the Gitane team was taken over by its parent company, the state-owned car manufacturer Renault, becoming Renault–Gitane–Campagnolo. Hinault started the season with second place at Paris–Nice. He then competed in the Critérium National de la Route. Trailing Raymond Martin by more than two minutes before the final 22 km (14 mi) time trial, he made up his significant deficit and won the event.

Hinault then competed in his first three-week Grand Tour, at the Vuelta a España, then held at the end of April. (Note: Since 1995, the Vuelta a España is held in late August–early September.) He won the opening prologue time trial in Gijón, but then let the leadership switch to Ferdi Van Den Haute. He won stage 11b, a mountain time trial in Barcelona, and regained the race lead the next day, when he won the stage to La Tossa de Montbui after an escape with teammate Jean-René Bernaudeau. He ensured his overall victory by winning stage 18 to Amurrio. On that stage, he bridged over to escapee Andrés Gandarias, who had earlier asked for Hinault's permission to attack. Hinault claimed to have been annoyed into attacking by one of Gandarias's teammates and offered to carry him to the finish. However, the Spaniard was unable to follow his wheel, saying: "This guy has made me suffer like a dog, he's tougher than Eddy Merckx!" In all, Hinault won five stages of the Vuelta. A sixth win was prevented on the final day of the Grand Tour, on which a short time trial was raced in the afternoon, held at San Sebastián in the Basque Country. The stage was marred by protests and obstructions by supporters of the Basque separatist group ETA. Hinault himself had sand thrown into his eyes, but won the stage nonetheless, only to find that the results would not count due to the surrounding circumstances.

Ahead of his first Tour de France, Hinault raced in the Tour de Suisse, where he did not feature prominently. He then travelled to the French Road Race Championship, held at Sarrebourg. He launched an escape, on which he rode 55 km (34 mi) solo, leading the rest of his competitors by more than six minutes by the start of the last lap. However, he had forgotten to eat enough and suffered from hypoglycemia during the last part of the race, crossing the finish line to take the title severely weakened. His victory allowed him to wear the French tricolore jersey for the following year.

"He marched forward like Napoleon. He took all the responsibility, stood in the front line, was spat at by the crowd."
Fellow rider Paul Sherwen describing Hinault's role in the riders' strike at Valence-d'Agen during the 1978 Tour de France.

In the Tour de France, Hinault fell behind early to challenger Zoetemelk when Renault lost two minutes to Mercier during the team time trial. On stage 8, the first longer individual time trial, Hinault gained back 59 seconds on Zoetemelk, while the previous two Tour winners, Van Impe and Thévenet, lost so much time that they were now counted out from chances of an overall win. Hinault rode conservatively in the Pyrenees to stay within striking distance of Zoetemelk. On stage 12a, from Tarbes to Valence-d'Agen, he firmly imprinted his authority on the race, although not by riding. The riders had been complaining about split stages, where more than one would be held on one day, as was the case on 12 July. When they reached the finishing town, they dismounted their bikes and walked to the finish line in protest. Hinault was chosen by his fellow competitors to be the spokesperson of the strike. Journalist Felix Magowan wrote: "Before today's strike, people were asking if the Tour had a boss. Today that was answered. His name is Hinault." Following the strike, Hinault had trouble sleeping and was caught out the next day, a stage in the Massif Central, forcing his team into a long chase. Thus weakened and slowed by spectator interference at a bike change, he lost 1:40 minutes to Zoetemelk on the following day's uphill time trial. Hinault countered the next day en route to Saint-Étienne during stage 15, breaking away with Hennie Kuiper. By the finish, the two had been reeled back, but Hinault contested the finishing sprint, winning the stage. The following day, stage 16 to Alpe d'Huez, ended with Zoetemelk, Hinault and the temporary leader of the general classification and thus yellow jersey wearer Michel Pollentier separated by only 18 seconds. However, Pollentier was disqualified for trying to cheat his doping test, leaving Hinault and Zoetemelk to fight out the overall victory. On the final mountain stage, Hinault put his rival under pressure, but was unable to make up any time. He then clinched the yellow jersey in the final time trial, gaining more than four minutes to win his first Tour de France with an advantage of 3:56 minutes. Following his Tour win, he finished fifth at the World Championships, before once more winning the Grand Prix des Nations, this time ahead of Francesco Moser.

==== 1979: Second Tour victory and Classics success ====
The 1979 season started slowly for an off-form Bernard Hinault. He bounced back at the La Flèche Wallonne classic in April, when he caught up to a breakaway by Giuseppe Saronni and Bernt Johansson, outsprinting the former to win the race. He then beat Zoetemelk to victory at the Dauphiné Libéré, winning four stages. He won the race by over ten minutes, also taking the points and mountain classifications. In the coming weeks ahead of the Tour, he proved his willingness to assist his teammates to ensure their loyalty, helping Lucien Didier win the Tour de Luxembourg and finishing second behind Roland Berland in the National Championship race.

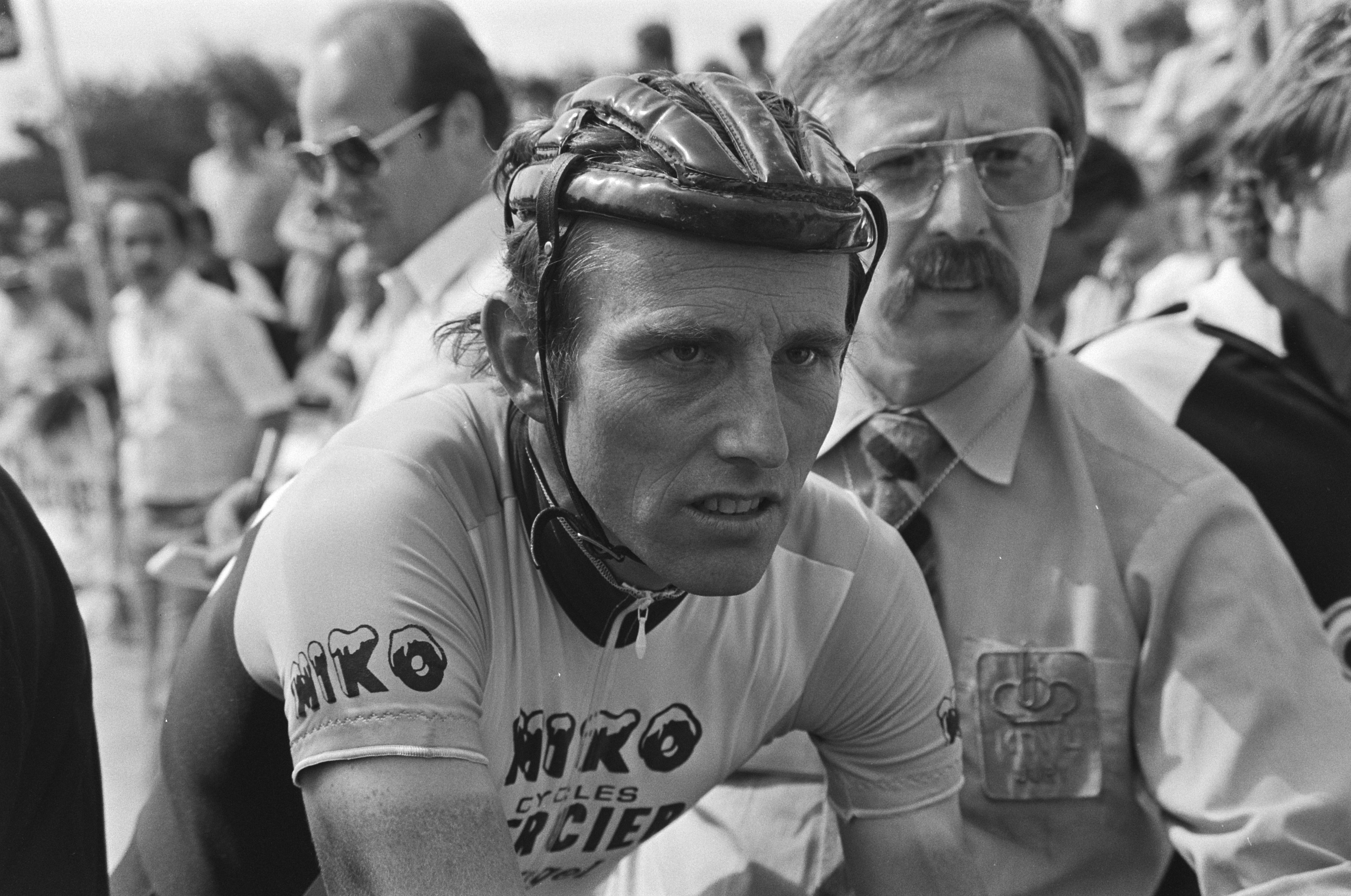
Joop Zoetemelk (pictured in 1979) was Hinault's strongest competitor during his first Tour de France victories.

The Tour de France was again a two-way battle between Hinault and Zoetemelk. In the prologue, Hinault was fourth, on the same time as the Dutchman. The mountain stages started immediately thereafter, with Hinault winning the mountain time trial on stage 2, taking over the yellow jersey. He also won the next stage into Pau. The team time trial on stage 4 again went Zoetemelk's way, as his Mercier team took back 41 seconds on Hinault's Renault squad. Zoetemelk now was only 12 seconds behind Hinault. On stage 8, in another team time trial, Renault fared much better, and Hinault extended his advantage to 1:18 minutes. The next day however, on a stage containing cobbled sections, Hinault suffered two punctures, losing almost four minutes and the race lead to Zoetemelk. He took back 36 seconds on the time trial in Brussels on stage 11 before regaining the race lead after another time trial, uphill to Avoriaz on stage 15. At this stage, he led Zoetemelk by 1:48 minutes, with third-placed Kuiper already more than 12 minutes behind. Hinault gained another minute on stage 16, before Zoetemelk regained 47 seconds up Alpe d'Huez three days later. The final time trial of the Tour went Hinault's way once again, extending his advantage by a further 69 seconds. He also took the next stage in a slightly uphill sprint finish. On the final stage towards the Champs-Élysées in Paris, traditionally a ceremonious affair without attacks, Zoetemelk and Hinault broke away, with both gapping the field and Hinault taking another stage victory. Zoetemelk finished 3:07 minutes behind Hinault, but then had ten minutes added to his time for failing a doping test. The next finisher, Joaquim Agostinho, was almost half an hour behind the winner.

Towards the end of the season, Hinault won his second cycling monument, the Giro di Lombardia. He had escaped from the field 150 km (93 mi) from the finish, but was later joined by some other riders. Only Silvano Contini finished with him, with the next group more than three minutes behind. The victory also secured that Hinault won his first of four consecutive Super Prestige Pernod International competitions, the award handed to the best rider of the season.

==== 1980: Attempt at the Triple Crown ====
As was often the case, Hinault started the season slowly in 1980, withdrawing from Paris–Nice. He then entered Paris–Roubaix, partly to prepare for the cobbled sections in the upcoming Tour de France, and finished fourth. A week later, he scored one of his most memorable wins at Liège–Bastogne–Liège. As soon as the riders left Liège, snow began to fall, soon turning into a blizzard. Hinault wanted to abandon, as had many others, including all but one of his teammates. He was convinced to carry on until the feeding station at Bastogne, where the snow had turned into rain. Only 21 riders were left by this point. Hinault removed his rain cape and attacked, catching up to the leaders and carried on by himself, winning with a margin of almost ten minutes ahead of Kuiper. The victory came at a price, as his right index and middle fingers took weeks to recover from frostbite, and caused him pain for several years.

Hinault and Guimard then turned their attention to the only Grand Tour he had not won yet: the Giro d'Italia. They hoped that Hinault would be able to reproduce a feat Eddy Merckx had achieved in 1974, winning the Giro, the Tour and the World Championship in the same year. This is commonly referred to as the Triple Crown of Cycling. (Note: Since Merckx, only Stephen Roche (1987) and Tadej Pogačar (2024) managed to repeat the Triple Crown.)

Hinault started the Giro d'Italia as odds-on favourite, pitted against local riders Francesco Moser and Giuseppe Saronni, who had the home crowd on their side. Following a fourth place at the prologue in Genoa, Hinault made a spontaneous visit to Fausto Coppi's home of Castellania, paying respect to the first rider ever to have won Giro and Tour in the same year. On stage 5, a time trial to Pisa, Hinault took over the race leader's pink jersey. He then relinquished his lead to Roberto Visentini, who was not considered to be a contender for the final victory. On stage 14, he attacked when the peloton relaxed after an intermediate sprint, winning the stage ahead of Wladimiro Panizza, who took the race lead. Hinault then made the decisive move of the race on stage 20, when he attacked on the tough climb of the Stelvio Pass. He caught up with his teammate Bernaudeau, and both carried on for the remaining 80 km (50 mi) of the stage together. Hinault gifted the stage victory to his teammate, while he clinched the overall victory almost six minutes ahead of Panizza.

In the Tour de France, Hinault was once again set to duel with Joop Zoetemelk, who had moved to the dominant TI–Raleigh–Creda squad. Hinault won the prologue in Frankfurt, Germany, five seconds ahead of Gerrie Knetemann. On stage 5 from Liège to Lille, which contained cobbled sections used in Paris–Roubaix, conditions were poor with rain and heavy winds. Hinault called for the field to take a slow tempo, but when Zoetemelk's teammate Jan Raas attacked, he went after him. He eventually found himself in a group with several other riders, while Zoetemelk was distanced. At 20 km (12 mi) from the finish, he followed another attack from Kuiper and won the sprint at the line. The next stage was set to contain more cobbled roads, but on Hinault's protest, most of the worst parts were taken out. Hinault had however suffered damage to his left knee on the stage to Lille. Hinault finished only fifth on stage 11's individual time trial, won by Zoetemelk. While he regained the yellow jersey, Zoetemelk was second, only 21 seconds behind. With his tendinitis worsening, he carried on until the end of stage 12, just before the race was headed for the first high mountains in the Pyrenees. That night, Hinault and Guimard told the race organisers, Jacques Goddet and Félix Lévitan, that he would abandon the race, while still in the lead. He left the race at night, not informing the press, which led to a fallout with the media that took years to recover. In Hinault's absence, Zoetemelk duly won his only Tour de France. Insinuations that Zoetemelk's victory had been a gift through Hinault's absence were countered by Hinault himself: "My problems were of my own making. It is always the absent rider who is at fault. I was absent and he took my place."

"Five laps from the finish it was obvious that no one was going to beat him. That was how he operated. It was just brutal. That was my introduction to the world of Bernard Hinault."
Robert Millar (Note: Millar later in life had a gender transition and is now known as Philippa York. For the purpose of this article, her name and gender from the 1980s are used.) describing his experience riding next to Hinault during the 1980 World Championship road race.

Hinault returned from the disappointment of the Tour to start at the World Championship road race, held on a very tough parcours in Sallanches, France, often named the hardest course in the history of the event. Hinault had broken away about 80 km (50 mi) from the finish with several riders. On the last lap, he dropped his last companion, Gianbattista Baronchelli, on the steepest part of a climb and soloed to victory. It had been a race of attrition with only 15 out of 107 riders reaching the finish.

==== 1981: Winning a third Tour de France ====
Hinault had never made his dislike for riding on cobbled roads a secret. The most prominent race of this character, Paris–Roubaix, was met with particular disdain, even though he never finished lower than thirteenth. After the 1980 edition, he had said to organiser Goddet: "You will never see me in this circus again." However, he returned for 1981, saying that he did so out of respect for his stature as World Champion. He suffered seven crashes and tyre punctures, but reached the finish at the velodrome with the lead group, where he outsprinted favourites Roger De Vlaeminck and Moser. One and a half weeks earlier, he had already added a victory at the Amstel Gold Race. Furthermore, he also won the Critérium International and again dominated the Dauphiné Libéré, winning by twelve minutes ahead of Agostinho.

At the Tour de France, Hinault took an early lead by winning the prologue, then relinquished the yellow jersey to Knetemann and later to Phil Anderson. On the time trial to Pau on stage 7, he regained the lead and never lost the jersey, beating Van Impe by almost a quarter of an hour. He won five stages, including all four individual time trials. Amidst media criticism that he was riding too defensively in the mountains, he also took victory in the Alps on a stage to Le Pleynet.

At the World Championship in Prague, Czechoslovakia, Hinault failed to defend his title. Having bridged a two-and-a-half-minute gap to a strong lead group on his own, he came third in the final sprint, behind Freddy Maertens and Saronni.

==== 1982: Achieving the Giro-Tour double ====
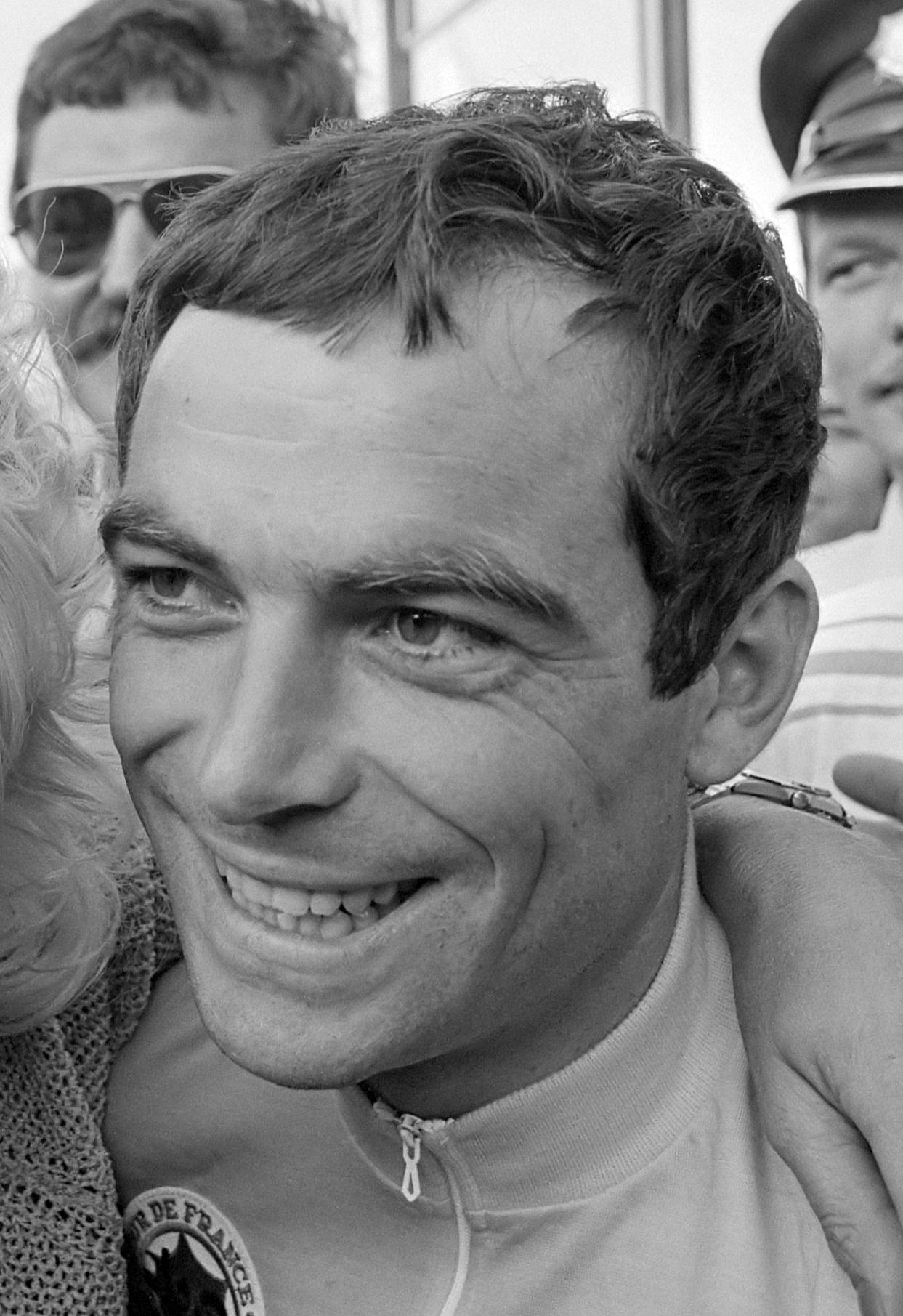
Hinault at the 1982 Tour de France

Hinault returned to the Giro in 1982. He looked set for victory after the first two weeks, having taken a significant lead after wins in the stage 3 time trial and stage 12 to Campitello Matese. However, on stage 17 to Boario Terme, Guimard and the Renault team misjudged the toughness of the climb and Hinault lost the lead to Silvano Contini. He hit back the next day, winning the stage to Montecampione, turning the race in his favour.

In "his most uneventful Tour", Hinault never looked in trouble on his way to completing the Giro-Tour double at the Tour de France. He won the prologue in Basel, Switzerland, before the lead briefly turned to Ludo Peeters and Phil Anderson. Hinault regained the yellow jersey after the first time trial and won the overall classification easily. He took four stages, including again the final one on the Champs-Élysées, this time from a bunch sprint. His participation in the final-stage sprint was seen as an answer to critics, who had once again lamented that Hinault had ridden the Tour without panache. Zoetemelk was again the runner-up, more than six minutes behind Hinault. Later in the season, Hinault added another victory at the Grand Prix des Nations.

==== 1983: Second Vuelta and the ascent of Fignon ====
Since 1981, Hinault had been joined at Renault by two young talents, Laurent Fignon and the American Greg LeMond. Both joined Hinault for the Vuelta a España, where he faced stiff competition from local riders like Marino Lejarreta, Julián Gorospe, and Alberto Fernández. Six days before the race started, he had won La Flèche Wallonne for a second time. On stage 4 of the Vuelta, Fignon attacked and won, but Lejarreta, the defending champion, had followed him and gained time on Hinault. Hinault came back and took the lead the following day on the mountain stage to Castellar de n'Hug. However, a day later, the Spanish teams jointly attacked and Lejarreta moved ahead of Hinault, who was 22 seconds down. At the uphill time trial at Balneario de Panticosa, he suffered and finished more than two minutes behind Lejarreta. Hinault joined forces with Kuiper and Saronni to attack on stage 10 to Soria, affected by crosswinds. He was in trouble again on stage 14, affected by returning pain in his knee; at one point he trailed his rivals by more than five minutes, but regained contact. In the time trial around Valladolid on stage 15b, Hinault won, now just ten seconds behind Gorospe, the new leader in the general classification. The following day brought the last mountain stage and Renault put pressure on Gorospe from early on. Hinault, joined by Lejarreta and Vicente Belda, escaped for 80 km (50 mi), distancing Gorospe by over twenty minutes with Hinault taking victory in Ávila, sealing his second Vuelta victory. Due to the tightly fought battle between Hinault and his Spanish competitors, the 1983 race is described on the Vuelta's website as "one of the most beautiful and spectacular" editions.

During the Vuelta, Hinault's tendinitis returned. After the race, he made two failed attempts to get back into racing, but eventually announced that he would miss the Tour de France. In his absence, teammate Fignon won the event on his first attempt. Hinault tried another comeback at a post-Tour criterium, (Note: In the weeks after the Tour de France, criterium races are held, mostly in France, Belgium, and the Netherlands, in which the competitors of the Tour appear and are allowed to wear the jerseys of the classifications they won during the event. In Hinault's days, these races provided appearance fees essential to the riders, since wages were low. The results of the race are usually agreed upon between the riders and the organisers beforehand.) but the pain returned and he did not race for the remainder of the season.

=== 1984–1986: La Vie Claire ===
==== 1984: Defeat at Fignon's hands ====
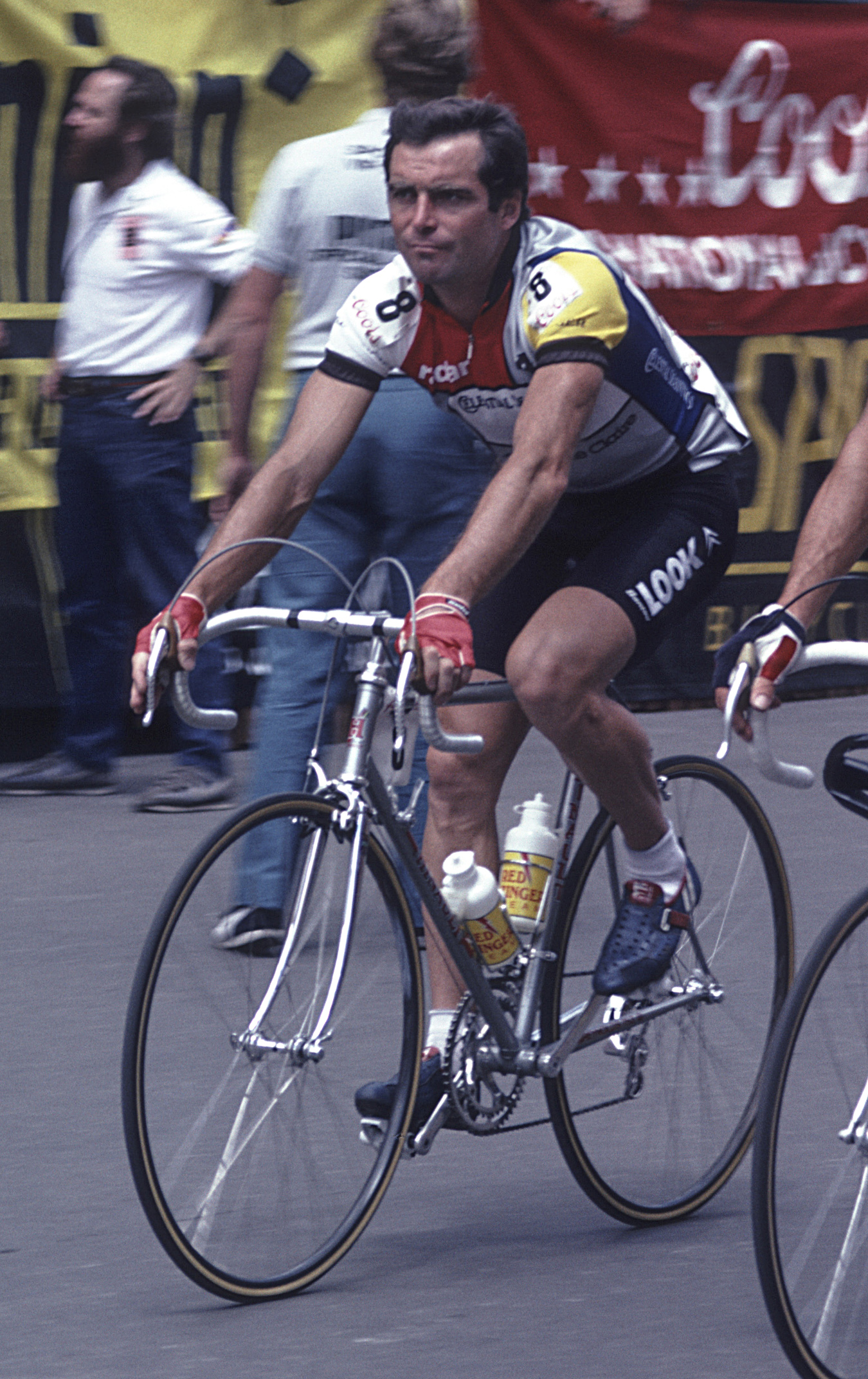
Bernard Hinault riding for La Vie Claire in 1985

By 1983, the relationship between Hinault and Guimard had deteriorated to a point where the former described their relationship as "war". Hinault forced a choice on the Renault team to either release him or oust Guimard. The team decided to stick with their directeur sportif, leading Hinault to search for a new team. He joined forces with businessman Bernard Tapie to form the new La Vie Claire squad. Their directeur sportif became Swiss coach Paul Köchli, who had made a name for himself with innovative and effective training methods, leaving Hinault a lot of freedom while at the same time scientifically measuring his progress. As part of his connection with Tapie, Hinault also contributed to the development of the clipless pedal, created by Look, another company owned by Tapie.

Hinault returned to racing at the Volta a la Comunitat Valenciana, where he won the final stage. He then took victory at the Four Days of Dunkirk. But his spring campaign lacked major successes. At the Dauphiné Libéré, he came second to Martín Ramírez, who later claimed that Hinault and his team had tried to intimidate him during the final stage of the race. A memorable episode occurred during the Paris–Nice, a race he finished third overall. During stage 5 to La Seyne-sur-Mer, Hinault was descending in a lead group with several other favourites. As they reached the valley, the road was blocked by protesters, unhappy with the announced closure of a dockyard at La Ciotat. While the other riders stopped, he drove into the group head-on, dismounted, and punched the protester closest to him. In the ensuing fist fight, Hinault sustained a broken rib.

The Tour de France was made out to be the big duel between Hinault and Fignon, who had just won the French National Championship. Hinault won the prologue, but Renault took the team time trial, 55 seconds ahead of La Vie Claire. He lost another 49 seconds to Fignon in the first long individual time trial, a discipline he had previously dominated. Following the second time trial, Hinault was only seventh on general classification, two minutes behind his adversary. The next stage led to Alpe d'Huez. Hinault attacked on the Rampe de Laffrey, but Fignon was able to respond. The two exchanged attacks on the way up the climb, but it was in the valley that Hinault was able to draw out a gap of about a minute. On Alpe d'Huez itself, he was first passed by eventual stage winner Luis Herrera. When he started to slow, Fignon caught up to him and eventually dropped Hinault, who lost a further three minutes. He ultimately finished the Tour in second place, a significant ten minutes behind Fignon.

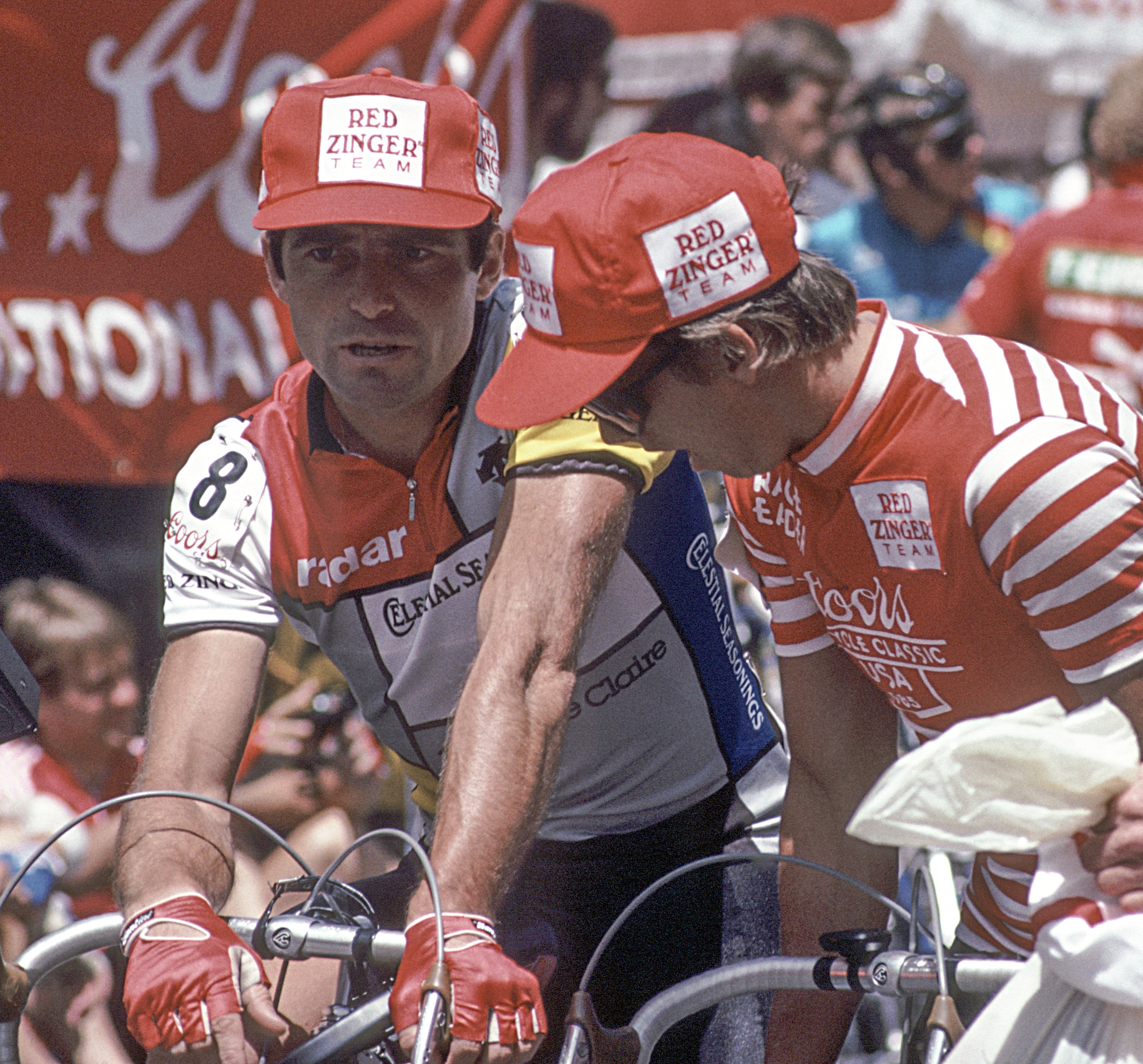
Hinault and Greg LeMond, at the 1985 Coors Classic

Hinault managed to bounce back from his Tour defeat in the fall. In late September, he took his fifth and final victory at the Grand Prix des Nations, riding the 90 km (56 mi) time trial at a then record speed of 44.19 km/h (27.46 mph). Fignon could only manage fourth, more than two minutes behind. Next, he won the Trofeo Baracchi, a two-man time trial, in which he competed with Moser. He then won the Giro di Lombardia for a second time, breaking away from the group of favourites 10 km (6.2 mi) from the finish.

==== 1985: The second Giro-Tour double ====
For 1985, Greg LeMond switched teams from Renault to join Hinault at La Vie Claire. Together, they entered the Giro d'Italia. During the race, Hinault was met with hostility from the home crowd, who supported local rider Francesco Moser. On the stage 12 time trial, Hinault took the pink jersey and opened the decisive gap to Moser, who would eventually finish second. During the stage however, Hinault was spat at by spectators and almost knocked over, even though his team car rode behind him with the door opened the entire time to ensure that bystanders would have a harder time impeding him. Hinault won his third Giro with a margin of just over a minute.

In the Tour de France, Fignon did not take part due to an Achilles heel injury. Hinault therefore entered the race as the favourite. He took victory in the prologue in his native Brittany. La Vie Claire won the stage 3 team time trial by over a minute. The next day, Hinault's teammate Kim Andersen took over the yellow jersey. Hinault supported him over the next days, even going so far as dropping back when Andersen punctured to lead him back into the peloton, showing his loyalty to riders who would later have to assist him. On stage 8, a time trial to Strasbourg, Hinault took back the race lead, winning the stage by more than two minutes ahead of Stephen Roche. While the race travelled through the Alps and in a second time trial, he consolidated his lead, building an advantage of five and a half minutes on LeMond, who was now second overall.

"I'll stir things up to help Greg win, and I'll have fun doing it. That's a promise."
Hinault pledging his support for Greg LeMond for the 1986 Tour de France in an interview at the 1985 race.

On stage 14 to Saint-Étienne, LeMond finished two minutes ahead of a group containing Hinault. Involved in a crash with other riders, Hinault crossed the finish line with a broken nose. Around the same time, he started to experience symptoms of bronchitis. On stage 17, he showed signs of weakness and was unable to stay with the other leaders on the Col du Tourmalet. LeMond meanwhile followed an attack by Roche, but was forbidden by the team to cooperate to distance Hinault. LeMond would later claim that the team had deceived him by telling him that Hinault was closer behind than he actually was. Hinault eventually finished the stage just over a minute behind LeMond. The time LeMond waited may have been enough so that the two teammates would have contested the Maillot Jaune in the penultimate time trial. In the penultimate day's time trial, LeMond won the stage, but only five seconds ahead of Hinault, not enough to surpass him. This secured Hinault a record-equalling fifth Tour victory, by just under two minutes over his younger teammate. After the finish, he publicly pledged that he would support LeMond's bid for a first Tour victory the following year.

==== 1986: The final season ====
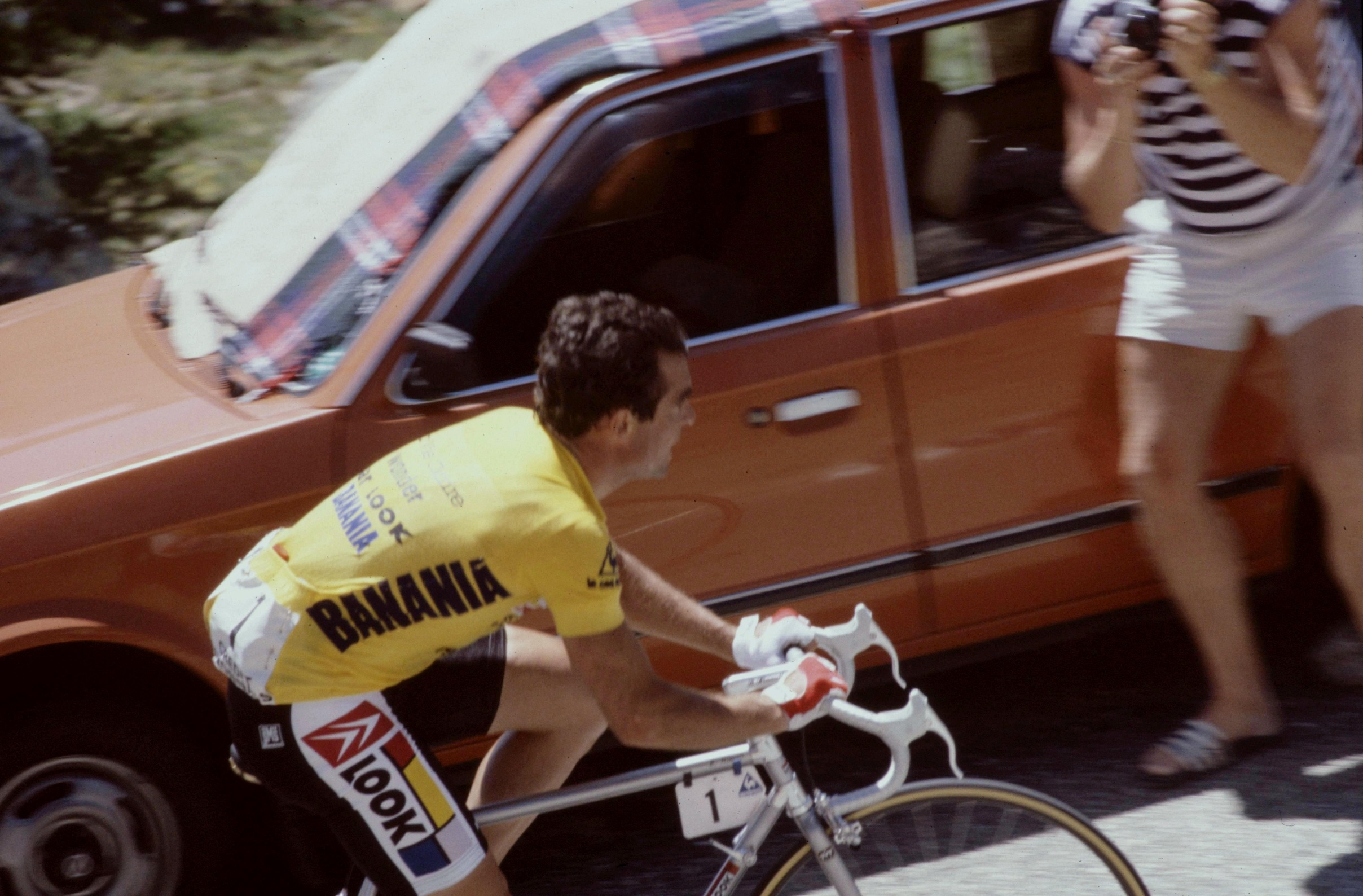
Hinault climbing the Col d'Izoard during the 1986 Tour de France. It was here that he lost significant time on rival Greg LeMond, losing the yellow jersey by the end of the stage.

On 21 January 1986, Hinault was appointed Knight of the Legion of Honour (Chevalier de la Légion d'honneur) by French president François Mitterrand. He had, in 1982, announced that he would retire from cycling on his 32nd birthday, in November 1986.

Even though Hinault had pledged support for LeMond for the Tour de France, a lot of public attention was given to the possibility of him winning a record sixth Tour. Their La Vie Claire team was seen as dominant, with Laurent Fignon as the most likely challenger. Hinault finished third in the prologue, two seconds ahead of LeMond and Fignon. In the team time trial on stage 2, Fignon and Système U gained almost two minutes on La Vie Claire, partly due to Hinault deciding that the squad would wait for two struggling riders, Niki Rüttimann and Guido Winterberg. Hinault then won the time trial on stage 9, gaining an additional 44 seconds on LeMond, who suffered a broken wheel and had to change his bike. Meanwhile, Fignon fell behind and later abandoned the race. On stage 12, from Bayonne to Pau, Hinault attacked with Pedro Delgado. The pair gained more than four and a half minutes on LeMond, with Delgado taking the stage win. Hinault was now in the lead of the general classification, 5:25 minutes ahead of LeMond. Even though his lead was significant, he attacked again the following day, on the descent of the Col du Tourmalet, the first climb of the day. By the top of the next climb, the Col d'Aspin, he led the rest of the field by two minutes. However, joint effort behind brought him back before the final ascent up to the ski station of Superbagnères. Hinault then cracked, coming in ninth, 4:39 minutes behind stage winner LeMond. He now led his teammate by only forty seconds in the general classification.

The race then moved over to the Alps. On stage 17, Hinault got left behind on the Col d'Izoard and lost the yellow jersey to LeMond, falling to third in the overall rankings, 2:47 minutes behind his teammate. Stage 18 featured three major climbs, the Col du Galibier, the Croix de Fer and the final ascent up to Alpe d'Huez. Hinault attacked repeatedly, but reached the bottom of Alpe d'Huez with LeMond. He led the way up the climb, lined by approximately 300,000 spectators and crossed the finish line hand in hand with LeMond, in an apparent display of comradery. Urs Zimmermann, who had been second overall at the start of the day, lost more than five minutes. Any signs of appeasement between the rivalling teammates was shattered by Hinault in a television interview shortly after the stage finish, when he declared that the race was not yet over, even though he trailed LeMond by 2:45 minutes.

Stage 20 saw the final time trial and the last chance for Hinault to overcome LeMond's advantage. Aided by a crash from LeMond, Hinault won the stage, but gained back only 25 seconds, conceding defeat after the stage. He lost an additional 52 seconds on stage 21. In his last Tour de France stage into Paris, he took part in the final sprint, taking fourth place. He ended his final Tour de France second overall, 3:10 minutes behind LeMond. He won the mountains classification and was also given the super-combativity award. Hinault's repeated attacks during the race and refusal to concede defeat irritated LeMond, who felt betrayed by Hinault's lack of loyalty.

After the Tour, Hinault won the Coors Classic race in the United States, ahead of LeMond. He rode the World Championships Road Race, held in Colorado Springs. He aimed to win, showing a lot of effort in his preparation. However, he finished the race in 59th place. On 19 September, he won his last competitive race, a criterium in Angers, France. Hinault's retirement from professional cycling on 14 November 1986 was celebrated in Quessoy with a symbolic race of 3,600 riders, a concert and fireworks. A total of 15,000 people attended the event.

== Retirement ==
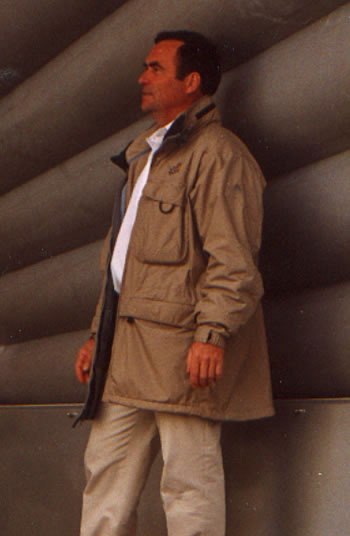
Hinault in his role as presenter at the Tour de France, in 2004

After his retirement from professional cycling, Bernard Hinault moved to his farm and bred dairy cows, assisted by his cousin René, who had become an agricultural engineer. Just two weeks after he ended his career, the Tour de France organisers, Amaury Sport Organisation (ASO), approached Hinault and invited him to join the race management team. He held several positions, including race regulator and route advisor. After Jean-Marie Leblanc took over the role as general director, Hinault was named the Tour's ambassador. Included in his duties was being present during podium ceremonies. During the podium for stage 3 of the 2008 Tour de France, a protester jumped on stage and disturbed proceedings. Hinault leapt forward and shoved him off. He stepped down from the role after the 2016 Tour de France. His role as ASO's brand ambassador was taken over by Stephen Roche, winner of the 1987 Tour de France.

Unlike many of his competitors, Hinault never became a directeur sportif (team manager) after his cycling career. Offers from Bouygues Télécom and a Chinese investor in the mid-2000s fell through. He was the selector of the France national team from 1988 to 1993.

On 13 July 2007, Hinault was promoted to an Officer of the Legion of Honour (Officier de la Légion d'honneur) by President Nicolas Sarkozy.

Hinault took a role as "patron" with the British Team Raleigh squad for the 2014 season. In June 2020, Hinault became part of a group of businessmen investing into saving the cycling equipment company Mavic, who are a long-time sponsor of the Tour de France. Mavic was put into receivership earlier in the year due to the economic consequences of the COVID-19 pandemic.

== Public image and riding style ==
=== Riding style and legacy ===
During his active career, Hinault was known as the patron of the field, meaning the rider with the highest authority. His biographer William Fotheringham has described him as "the last of the sport's patrons". In this role, Hinault would use his influence with race organisers, control the pace of the peloton, and allow or refuse other riders the chance to attack. The riders' strike at Valence d'Agen in the 1978 Tour is cited as the first instance in which Hinault assumed this role. His fellow riders stated that he, even though he did not talk much, was able to exert a high amount of certainty and therefore strength, which brought him respect and sometimes fear from his competitors. To signal his authority, Hinault often symbolically rode at the front of the field, instead of in the slipstream of his teammates. His riding style has been described as "fighting, full of aggression", and he stated that when he did not feel good in a race, his reaction would be to attack. Hinault described his own role as follows:

You are like a soldier, a general who dominates, who imposes his will on the others. I believe that you are born like that. Some are born to be workers, others to be in charge. I could have been a warlord. I would have waged war to win castles and land if I'd been born in the Middle Ages.

"Now, let's love him."
Headline of the sports newspaper L'Equipe on the day after Hinault lost the 1984 Tour de France to Laurent Fignon.

Hinault was however not always successful in his endeavours. During the 1980 Tour de France, he sought to remove the rule which excluded riders outside the time limit on each stage. He urged the riders to protest and ride slowly, but some did not follow his example, forcing Hinault to chase them down before he eventually left the race. His enigmatic exit from the 1980 Tour created tensions with the press that would persist during the rest of his active career. By 1982, debates about his personality started to appear more and more in the media. Particular interest was given to an alleged lack of panache during his Tour wins and his behaviour towards fans and officials, whom he treated with open disgust. Fotheringham suggests that Hinault only regained popularity with the French public after his knee problems and his Tour defeat in 1984. Fellow racer Robert Millar suggested that in 1986 in particular, Hinault attempted to win over the French public by riding aggressively.

Hinault was not known to particularly enjoy going on training rides, unless he was specifically preparing for an event. He would often greet his training partners in a night gown when they arrived on time for training or have an easy day of training that included stops at a bakery for cake. His distaste for training became even more evident in the winter, when he would gain a lot of weight. Laurent Fignon described the first training camps of the year as follows: "He looked as if he had been inflated. If you didn't know the Badger you would wonder how long it would take for him to get back to what he had been. You would be making a huge mistake." Hinault was capable of suffering through the training camp and returning to winning form within a month. Unlike a rider like Eddy Merckx, Hinault would not aim to win every race he entered. Millar described his approach as such: "Hinault either cared or he didn't. When he didn't care about winning he'd bumble round and hurt you now and again just to remind you he was there."

With a résumé of victories that includes all three Grand Tours (all of them more than once), the World Road Championships and a number of classics, Hinault has often been cited among the greatest cyclists of all time. The Historical Dictionary of Cycling describes him as "one of the best riders ever". Comparisons are often drawn with Eddy Merckx, against whom Hinault rode at the beginning of his career. Lucien Van Impe commented: "Merckx was the greatest, but Bernard [Hinault] was the most impressive." A study conducted in 2006, ranking Tour de France riders from 1953 to 2004 by different performance indicators, put Hinault as the top Tour rider of that period, ahead of Merckx and Lance Armstrong.

Prior to the start of the 2022 Tour de France, L'Equipe held a poll to vote on the greatest French cyclist of all time. The third and fourth places were Louison Bobet and Raymond Poulidor both of whom were a good distance behind Hinault and Jacques Anquetil in the voting. Hinault was a member of the jury and his vote turned out to be decisive as he narrowly defeated Anquetil. When asked about it, he made the argument that if Anquetil were in the same position he would likely vote for himself in a similar manner. He also explained, "It's difficult for me to analyze.... It has always been said that I was the second greatest behind Eddy Merckx at the world level, so it is logical to find myself first at the French level."

=== Nickname ===
Hinault was nicknamed le blaireau in French, a term that can be translated into English as either "the shaving brush" or "the badger". According to Fotheringham, the nickname originates from Hinault's early training partners, Maurice Le Guilloux and Georges Talbourdet, who would use the term to tease the young rider. Le Guilloux used it once in front of Pierre Chany, a writer for L'Équipe, and the name stuck. According to Hinault himself, the term in the first place was supposed to mean no more than "mate" or "buddy". However, Hinault later embraced the association with the wild animal. In 2003, he commented: "A badger is a beautiful thing. When it's hunted it goes into its sett and waits. When it comes out again, it attacks. That's the reason for my nickname. When I'm annoyed I go home, you don't see me for a month. When I come out again, I win." Hinault, as early as 1983, owned a stuffed badger to demonstrate his association with the animal.

=== Stance on doping ===
Hinault never tested positive for performance-enhancing drugs during his professional career and was never implicated in any doping practices. He did, however, lead a riders' protest during a criterium race in Callac in 1982 against the sudden introduction of doping controls. He was handed a one-month suspended ban and fined CHF 1,110, though the penalty was never enforced.

Bernard Hinault has been outspoken about several prominent doping cases in the past years. In 2013, he heavily criticised French senators for revealing the results of tests conducted in 2004 on samples from the 1998 Tour de France. He called the initiative "bullshit" and urged lawmakers "to stop bringing out the dead", claiming they "want to kill the Tour". In the same year, he reacted to comments made by Lance Armstrong, a rider stripped of seven Tour victories due to doping offences. Armstrong suggested that it would be impossible to win the Tour de France without performance-enhancing substances. To counter this claim, Hinault replied: "He must not know what it was like to ride without doping." Armstrong later clarified that he had spoken about the time when he was riding (1999–2005). In early 2018, Hinault also spoke out about the adverse analytical result for salbutamol of four-time Tour winner Chris Froome at the 2017 Vuelta a España. He criticised Froome for taking part in the 2018 Giro d'Italia while the investigation was still ongoing. In addition, he commented that Froome could not be "listed among the cycling greats". Froome would win the Giro and become the first rider since Hinault to hold all three Grand Tour Jerseys at once. Before the 2018 Tour de France, with Froome's case still ongoing, he urged the other riders to strike in protest if Froome competed. Froome was later cleared of the charges and started the Tour where he finished third behind teammate Geraint Thomas and Tom Dumoulin.

== Career achievements ==
=== Major results ===
1972
1st Road race, National Junior Road Championships
1974
5th Overall Étoile des Espoirs
1975
1st Overall Circuit de la Sarthe
2nd Paris–Bourges
3rd Grand Prix d'Isbergues
6th Overall Tour de l'Oise
6th Grand Prix des Nations
7th Overall Paris–Nice
1976
1st Overall Circuit de la Sarthe

1st Stage 3a (ITT)

1st Overall Tour du Limousin

1st Stage 1

1st Overall Tour de l'Aude

1st Stage 1

1st Overall Tour d'Indre-et-Loire

1st Stage 2b (ITT)

1st Paris–Camembert
1st Stage 2 Étoile des Espoirs
2nd Overall À travers Lausanne
3rd Overall Grand Prix du Midi Libre
4th Grand Prix Pino Cerami
6th Road race, UCI Road World Championships
6th Grand Prix des Nations
10th Overall Four Days of Dunkirk
1977
1st Overall Critérium du Dauphiné Libéré

1st Stages 1 & 5

1st Overall Tour du Limousin

1st Stage 1

1st Liège–Bastogne–Liège
1st Gent–Wevelgem
1st Grand Prix des Nations
1st Stage 2b (ITT) Étoile des Espoirs
2nd Overall Tour Cycliste du Tarn

1st Mountains classification

2nd Overall Tour d'Indre-et-Loire

1st Stage 2b

3rd Paris–Brussels
4th Overall Tour de l'Aude
5th Paris–Camembert
6th Overall Paris–Nice
6th GP Ouest–France
6th Tour du Haut Var
7th Overall Grand Prix du Midi Libre
7th Grand Prix de Plumelec
8th Road race, UCI Road World Championships
10th Grand Prix d'Isbergues
1978
1st Road race, National Road Championships
1st Overall Tour de France

1st Stages 8 (ITT), 15 & 20 (ITT)
Held after Stage 17

1st Overall Vuelta a España

1st Prologue, Stages 11b (ITT), 12, 14 & 18

1st Overall Critérium National de la Route

1st Stage 3 (ITT)

1st Grand Prix des Nations
1st Boucles de l'Aulne
2nd Overall Paris–Nice
2nd Overall À travers Lausanne
3rd Giro di Lombardia
4th Giro del Lazio
5th Road race, UCI Road World Championships
9th Overall Tour Cycliste du Tarn
1979
1st Overall Tour de France

1st Points classification
1st Stages 2 (ITT), 3, 11 (ITT), 15 (ITT), 21 (ITT), 23 & 24
Held after Stage 2

1st Overall Critérium du Dauphiné Libéré

1st Points classification
1st Mountains classification
1st Stages 3, 5b (ITT), 6 & 7b (ITT)

1st Overall Tour de l'Oise

1st Prologue

1st Overall Super Prestige Pernod International
1st Giro di Lombardia
1st La Flèche Wallonne
1st Boucles de l'Aulne
1st Grand Prix des Nations
2nd Road race, National Road Championships
2nd Overall Critérium National de la Route

1st Stage 3 (ITT)

2nd Overall Tour de Luxembourg

1st Stage 3

2nd Liège–Bastogne–Liège
3rd Overall Tour Cycliste du Tarn
3rd Overall À travers Lausanne
3rd Critérium des As
6th Overall Paris–Nice
6th Overall Étoile des Espoirs

1st Stages 3b (ITT) & 4

6th Paris–Tours
7th Milan–San Remo
8th Gent–Wevelgem
8th Grand Prix de Wallonie
1980
1st Road race, UCI Road World Championships
1st Overall Giro d'Italia

1st Stage 14

1st Overall Tour de Romandie
1st Overall Super Prestige Pernod International
1st Liège–Bastogne–Liège
Tour de France

1st Prologue, Stages 4 (ITT) & 5
Held after Prologue, Stages 1a & 11–12
Held after Prologue

Tour de l'Aude

1st Points classification
1st Prologue & Stage 3

1st Stage 1 Tour du Limousin
2nd Road race, National Road Championships
2nd Boucles de l'Aulne
3rd La Flèche Wallonne
4th Paris–Roubaix
5th Amstel Gold Race
5th Grand Prix de Monaco
7th Overall Critérium National de la Route

1st Stage 3 (ITT)

7th Overall Tour Cycliste du Tarn

1st Mountains classification
1st Stage 1b

1981
1st Overall Tour de France

1st Combination classification
1st Prologue, Stages 6 (ITT), 14 (ITT), 18 & 20 (ITT)
Held after Prologue
Held after Stages 2–15
Combativity award Overall

1st Overall Critérium du Dauphiné Libéré

1st Points classification
1st Mountains classification
1st Stages 4, 5, 6 & 7

1st Overall Critérium International

1st Stages 1, 2 & 3

1st Overall Super Prestige Pernod International
1st Paris–Roubaix
1st Amstel Gold Race
1st Boucles de l'Aulne
1st Grand Prix de la ville de Nogent-sur-Oise
3rd Road race, UCI Road World Championships
3rd Grand Prix Eddy Merckx
4th Overall Tour Méditerranéen

1st Stage 1

4th Grand Prix des Nations
10th Overall Tour de l'Aude
1982
1st Overall Tour de France

1st Combination classification
1st Prologue, Stages 14 (ITT), 19 (ITT) & 21
Held after Prologue

1st Overall Giro d'Italia

1st Prologue (TTT), Stages 3 (ITT), 12, 18, & 22 (ITT)

1st Overall Tour de Luxembourg

1st Stage 2

1st Overall Tour d'Armorique

1st Prologue

1st Overall Super Prestige Pernod International
1st Grand Prix d'Ouverture La Marseillaise
1st Polynormande
1st Critérium des As
1st Grand Prix des Nations
3rd Overall Tour de l'Aude
4th Overall Tour de Romandie

1st Stage 4b (ITT)

6th Overall Escalada a Montjuïc
8th Overall Critérium International
9th Paris–Roubaix
10th Paris–Brussels
1983
1st Overall Vuelta a España

1st Stages 15b (ITT) & 17

1st La Flèche Wallonne
1st Grand Prix Pino Cerami
5th Overall Tour Midi-Pyrénées

1st Stage 3

1984
1st Overall Four Days of Dunkirk
1st Giro di Lombardia
1st Grand Prix des Nations
1st Trofeo Baracchi (with Francesco Moser)
1st Stage 5 Volta a la Comunitat Valenciana
2nd Overall Tour de France

1st Prologue
Held & after Prologue
Combativity award Overall

2nd Overall Critérium du Dauphiné Libéré

1st Mountains classification

3rd Overall Paris–Nice
4th Züri-Metzgete
4th Critérium des As
5th Overall Tour d'Armorique
7th Overall Critérium International
7th Boucles de l'Aulne
8th Overall Grand Prix du Midi Libre
1985
1st Overall Tour de France

1st Prologue, Stages 3 (TTT) & 8 (ITT)
Held & after Prologue

1st Overall Giro d'Italia

1st Stage 12 (ITT)

1st Boucles de l'Aulne
8th Trofeo Baracchi (with Greg LeMond)
9th Overall Coors Classic

1st Stages 3 & 11b (ITT)

1986
1st Overall Coors Classic

1st Stages 7a (ITT) & 11a (ITT)

1st Overall Volta a la Comunitat Valenciana
1st Trofeo Luis Puig
1st Stage 7 Clásico RCN
1st Prologue Four Days of Dunkirk
2nd Overall Tour de France

1st Mountains classification
1st Stages 9 (ITT), 18 & 20 (ITT)
Held after Stages 12–16
Combativity award Overall

6th Overall Tour Midi-Pyrénées

1st Stage 2

==== General classification results timeline ====
Grand Tour general classification results
Grand Tour	1975	1976	1977	1978	1979	1980	1981	1982	1983	1984	1985	1986
Vuelta a España	—	—	—	1	—	—	—	—	1	—	—	—
Giro d'Italia	—	—	—	—	—	1	—	1	—	—	1	—
Tour de France	—	—	—	1	1	DNF	1	1	—	2	1	2
Major stage race general classification results
Major stage race	1975	1976	1977	1978	1979	1980	1981	1982	1983	1984	1985	1986
Paris–Nice	7	12	5	2	6	DNF	—	—	—	3	—	—
Tirreno–Adriatico	—	—	—	—	—	—	DNF	—	—	—	DNF	—
Tour of the Basque Country	Did not contest during his career											
Tour de Romandie	—	—	—	—	—	1	—	4	—	—	DNF	—
Critérium du Dauphiné	38	—	1	—	1	—	1	—	—	2	—	—
Tour de Suisse	—	—	—	11	—	—	—	—	—	—	—	29
Volta a Catalunya	Did not contest during his career											

==== Classics results timeline ====
Monument	1975	1976	1977	1978	1979	1980	1981	1982	1983	1984	1985	1986
Milan–San Remo	54	—	—	—	7	—	—	—	—	DNF	—	—
Tour of Flanders	—	—	DNS	11	—	—	—	—	—	—	—	—
Paris–Roubaix	—	—	—	13	11	4	1	9	DNF	—	—	—
Liège–Bastogne–Liège	—	—	1	—	2	1	18	—	32	19	18	—
Giro di Lombardia	—	17	—	3	1	—	—	—	—	1	—	—
Classic	1975	1976	1977	1978	1979	1980	1981	1982	1983	1984	1985	1986
Amstel Gold Race	—	—	—	—	—	5	1	—	—	—	—	—
Gent–Wevelgem	—	—	1	—	8	—	42	—	—	—	—	—
La Flèche Wallonne	—	—	35	—	1	3	42	15	1	19	23	16
Züri-Metzgete	—	—	—	—	—	29	—	—	—	4	58	—
Paris–Brussels	—	—	3	—	—	—	—	10	—	—	—	—
Paris–Tours	46	79	47	27	6	—	—	44	—	28	—	—

Legend
—	Did not compete
DNF	Did not finish
DNS	Did not start

== See also ==
- Giro d'Italia records and statistics
- List of cycling records
- List of French people
- List of Giro d'Italia general classification winners
- List of Grand Tour general classification winners
- List of Tour de France general classification winners
- List of Tour de France secondary classification winners
- List of Vuelta a España classification winners
- List of Vuelta a España general classification winners
- Yellow jersey statistics

== Bibliography ==
- Augendre, Jacques (2018). La Tour de France: Guide historique [Historical guide] (PDF) (in French). Paris: Amaury Sport Organisation. Archived (PDF) from the original on 26 July 2018.
- Fotheringham, William (2015). The Badger: Bernard Hinault and the Fall and Rise of French Cycling. London: Yellow Jersey Press. ISBN 978-0-224-09205-0.
- Laget, Françoise; Laget, Serge; Cazaban, Philippe; Montgermont, Gilles (2013). Tour de France: Official 100th Race Anniversary Edition. London: Quercus. ISBN 978-1-78206-414-5.
- McGann, Bill; McGann, Carol (2008). The Story of the Tour de France – How a Newspaper Promotion Became the Greatest Sporting Event in the World. Volume 2: 1965–2007. Indianapolis, IN: Dog Ear Publishing. ISBN 978-1-59858-608-4.
- Moore, Richard (2011). Slaying the Badger: LeMond, Hinault and the Greatest Ever Tour de France. London: Yellow Jersey Press. ISBN 978-0-224-09986-8.
- Moore, Richard (2014). Étape: The Untold Stories of the Tour de France's Defining Stages. London: HarperSport. ISBN 978-0-00-750010-9.
- Van Gucht, Ruben (2015). Hinault. London: Bloomsbury. ISBN 978-1-47-291296-1.
- Wheatcroft, Geoffrey (2013). Le Tour: A History of the Tour de France. London: Simon & Schuster. ISBN 978-1-4711-2894-3.
