= 1980 Paris–Roubaix =

Race details
- Dates: 13 April 1980
- Stages: 1
- Distance: 264 km (164.0 mi)
- Winning time: 6h 07' 28"

Results
	Winner	Francesco Moser (ITA)	(Sanson–Campagnolo)
	Second	Gilbert Duclos-Lassalle (FRA)	(Peugeot–Esso–Michelin)
	Third	Dietrich Thurau (FRG)	(Puch–Sem–Campagnolo)

The 1980 Paris–Roubaix was the 78th edition of the Paris–Roubaix cycle race and was held on 13 April 1980. The race started in Compiègne and finished in Roubaix. The race was won by Francesco Moser of the Sanson team.

== General classification ==
Final general classification

Rank	Rider	Team	Time
1	Francesco Moser (ITA)	Sanson–Campagnolo	6h 07' 28"
2	Gilbert Duclos-Lassalle (FRA)	Peugeot–Esso–Michelin	+ 1' 48"
3	Dietrich Thurau (FRG)	Puch–Sem–Campagnolo	+ 3' 30"
4	Bernard Hinault (FRA)	Renault–Gitane	+ 6' 05"
5	Marc Demeyer (BEL)	IJsboerke–Warncke Eis	+ 6' 05"
6	Alfons De Wolf (BEL)	Boule d'Or–Studio Casa	+ 6' 05"
7	Daniel Willems (BEL)	IJsboerke–Warncke Eis	+ 6' 05"
8	William Tackaert (BEL)	DAF Trucks–Lejeune	+ 8' 37"
9	Ludo Peeters (BEL)	IJsboerke–Warncke Eis	+ 9' 35"
10	Piet van Katwijk (NED)	TI–Raleigh–Creda	+ 10' 38"
