= 1983 La Flèche Wallonne =

Race details
- Dates: 14 April 1983
- Stages: 1
- Distance: 248 km (154.1 mi)
- Winning time: 6h 56' 00"

Results
	Winner	Bernard Hinault (FRA)	(Renault–Elf)
	Second	René Bittinger (FRA)	(Sem–France Loire–Reydel–Mavic)
	Third	Hubert Seiz (SUI)	(Cilo–Aufina)

The 1983 La Flèche Wallonne was the 47th edition of La Flèche Wallonne cycle race and was held on 14 April 1983. The race started in Charleroi and finished in Huy. The race was won by Bernard Hinault of the Renault team.

== General classification ==
Final general classification

Rank	Rider	Team	Time
1	Bernard Hinault (FRA)	Renault–Elf	6h 56' 00"
2	René Bittinger (FRA)	Sem–France Loire–Reydel–Mavic	+ 0"
3	Hubert Seiz (SUI)	Cilo–Aufina	+ 0"
4	Eddy Schepers (BEL)	Perlav–Eurosoap–Castelli–Gazelle	+ 0"
5	Jonathan Boyer (USA)	Sem–France Loire–Reydel–Mavic	+ 0"
6	Joop Zoetemelk (NED)	COOP–Mercier–Mavic	+ 0"
7	Michel Pollentier (BEL)	Safir–Van de Ven	+ 1' 12"
8	Guido Van Calster (BEL)	Del Tongo–Colnago	+ 1' 14"
9	Alfons De Wolf (BEL)	Bianchi–Piaggio	+ 1' 14"
10	Greg LeMond (USA)	Renault–Elf	+ 1' 14"
