= 1978 Paris–Nice =

Race details
- Dates: 5–11 March 1978
- Stages: 6 + Prologue
- Distance: 1,154.2 km (717.2 mi)
- Winning time: 30h 07' 07"

Results
Jersey awarded to the overall winner	Winner	Gerrie Knetemann (NED)	(TI–Raleigh–McGregor)
	Second	Bernard Hinault (FRA)	(Renault–Gitane–Campagnolo)
	Third	Joop Zoetemelk (NED)	(Miko–Mercier–Vivagel)
Jersey awarded to the points classification winner	Points	Gerrie Knetemann (NED)	(T.I. Raleigh)
Jersey awarded to the mountains classification winner	Mountains	Michel Laurent (FRA)	(Peugeot-Michelin)
Jersey awarded to the youth classification winner	Youth	Bernard Hinault (FRA)	(Gitane-Renault)

The 1978 Paris–Nice was the 36th edition of the Paris–Nice cycle race and was held from 5 March to 11 March 1978. The race started in Paris and finished in Nice. The race was won by Gerrie Knetemann of the TI–Raleigh team.

== General classification ==
Final general classification

Rank	Rider	Team	Time
1	Gerrie Knetemann (NED)	TI–Raleigh–McGregor	30h 07' 07"
2	Bernard Hinault (FRA)	Renault–Gitane–Campagnolo	+ 19"
3	Joop Zoetemelk (NED)	Miko–Mercier–Vivagel	+ 31"
4	Michel Laurent (FRA)	Peugeot–Esso–Michelin	+ 1' 22"
5	Yves Hézard (FRA)	Peugeot–Esso–Michelin	+ 1' 26"
6	Henk Lubberding (NED)	TI–Raleigh–McGregor	+ 1' 57"
7	Hennie Kuiper (NED)	TI–Raleigh–McGregor	+ 1' 57"
8	Gilbert Duclos-Lassalle (FRA)	Peugeot–Esso–Michelin	+ 3' 01"
9	André Mollet (FRA)	Miko–Mercier–Vivagel	+ 3' 02"
10	Sven-Åke Nilsson (SWE)	Miko–Mercier–Vivagel	+ 3' 10"
