= 1979 Giro di Lombardia =

Race details
- Dates: 13 October 1979
- Stages: 1
- Distance: 249 km (154.7 mi)
- Winning time: 6h 13' 25"

Results
	Winner	Bernard Hinault (FRA)	(Renault–Gitane)
	Second	Silvano Contini (ITA)	(Bianchi–Faema)
	Third	Giovanni Battaglin (ITA)	(Inoxpran)

The 1979 Giro di Lombardia was the 73rd edition of the Giro di Lombardia cycle race and was held on 13 October 1979. The race started in Milan and finished in Como. The race was won by Bernard Hinault of the Renault team.

== General classification ==
Final general classification

Rank	Rider	Team	Time
1	Bernard Hinault (FRA)	Renault–Gitane	6h 13' 25"
2	Silvano Contini (ITA)	Bianchi–Faema	+ 0"
3	Giovanni Battaglin (ITA)	Inoxpran	+ 3' 20"
4	Jean-Luc Vandenbroucke (BEL)	Peugeot–Esso–Michelin	+ 3' 20"
5	Ronald De Witte (BEL)	Sanson–Luxor TV–Campagnolo	+ 3' 20"
6	Ludo Peeters (BEL)	IJsboerke–Warncke Eis	+ 3' 20"
7	Alessandro Pozzi (ITA)	Bianchi–Faema	+ 3' 20"
8	Palmiro Masciarelli (ITA)	Sanson–Luxor TV–Campagnolo	+ 4' 22"
9	Alfio Vandi (ITA)	Magniflex–Famcucine	+ 4' 22"
10	Hennie Kuiper (NED)	Peugeot–Esso–Michelin	+ 4' 27"
