= 1980 Tour de Romandie =

Race details
- Dates: 6–11 May 1980
- Stages: 5 + Prologue
- Distance: 837.6 km (520.5 mi)
- Winning time: 22h 27' 37"

Results
	Winner	Bernard Hinault (FRA)	(Renault–Gitane)
	Second	Silvano Contini (ITA)	(Bianchi–Piaggio)
	Third	Giuseppe Saronni (ITA)	(Gis Gelati)

The 1980 Tour de Romandie was the 34th edition of the Tour de Romandie cycle race and was held from 6 May to 11 May 1980. The race started in Meyrin and finished in Fribourg. The race was won by Bernard Hinault of the Renault team.

== General classification ==
Final general classification
Rank	Rider	Team	Time
1	Bernard Hinault (FRA)	Renault–Gitane	22h 27' 37"
2	Silvano Contini (ITA)	Bianchi–Piaggio	+ 54"
3	Giuseppe Saronni (ITA)	Gis Gelati	+ 2' 02"
4	Johan van der Velde (NED)	TI–Raleigh–Creda	+ 2' 16"
5	Joop Zoetemelk (NED)	TI–Raleigh–Creda	+ 2' 16"
6	Knut Knudsen (NOR)	Bianchi–Piaggio	+ 3' 10"
7	Raymond Martin (FRA)	Miko–Mercier–Vivagel	+ 3' 28"
8	Robert Millar (GBR)	Peugeot–Esso–Michelin	+ 3' 48"
9	Daniel Willems (BEL)	IJsboerke–Warncke Eis	+ 4' 00"
10	Sven-Åke Nilsson (SWE)	Miko–Mercier–Vivagel	+ 4' 17"
