= 1979 Critérium du Dauphiné Libéré =

Race details
- Dates: 21–28 May 1979
- Stages: 7 + Prologue
- Distance: 1,395 km (867 mi)
- Winning time: 37h 06' 26"

Results
	Winner	Bernard Hinault (FRA)	(Renault–Gitane)
	Second	Henk Lubberding (NED)	(TI–Raleigh–McGregor)
	Third	Francisco Galdós (ESP)	(Kas–Campagnolo)
	Points	Bernard Hinault (FRA)	(Renault–Gitane)
	Mountains	Bernard Hinault (FRA)	(Renault–Gitane)
	Team	Renault–Gitane	

The 1979 Critérium du Dauphiné Libéré was the 31st edition of the cycle race and was held from 21 May to 28 May 1979. The race started in Mâcon and finished in Annecy. The race was won by Bernard Hinault of the Renault team.

== Teams ==
Ten teams, containing a total of 100 riders, participated in the race:

- DAF Trucks–Aida
- Fiat
- Flandria–Ça va seul
- Magniflex–Famcucine
- Kas–Campagnolo
- Miko–Mercier–Vivagel
- Peugeot–Esso–Michelin
- La Redoute–Motobécane
- Renault–Gitane
- TI–Raleigh–McGregor

== Route ==
Stage characteristics and winners
Stage	Date	Course	Distance	Type	Winner
P	21 June	Mâcon	3.6 km (2.2 mi)	Individual time trial	Joop Zoetemelk (NED)
1	22 June	Mâcon to Roanne	236 km (147 mi)		Klaus-Peter Thaler (FRG)
2	23 June	Roanne to Villeurbanne	209 km (130 mi)		Frits Pirard (NED)
3	24 June	Villeurbanne to Avignon	228 km (142 mi)		Bernard Hinault (FRA)
4	25 June	Avignon to Valence	217 km (135 mi)		Marc Demeyer (BEL)
5a	26 June	Valence to Grenoble	138 km (86 mi)		Leo van Vliet (NED)
5b	26 June	La Bastille	4 km (2.5 mi)	Individual time trial	Bernard Hinault (FRA)
6	27 June	Grenoble to Chambéry	199.5 km (124.0 mi)		Bernard Hinault (FRA)
7a	28 June	Chambéry to Annecy	122 km (76 mi)		Wilfried Wesemael (BEL)
7b	28 June	Annecy	37.85 km (23.52 mi)	Individual time trial	Bernard Hinault (FRA)

== General classification ==
Final general classification

Rank	Rider	Team	Time
1	Bernard Hinault (FRA)	Renault–Gitane	37h 06' 26"
2	Henk Lubberding (NED)	TI–Raleigh–McGregor	+ 10' 27"
3	Francisco Galdós (ESP)	Kas–Campagnolo	+ 11' 56"
4	Gianbattista Baronchelli (ITA)	Magniflex–Famcucine	+ 12' 43"
5	Jo Maas (NED)	DAF Trucks–Aida	+ 14' 01"
6	Joaquim Agostinho (POR)	Flandria–Ça va seul	+ 14' 05"
7	Jean-René Bernaudeau (FRA)	Renault–Gitane	+ 14' 44"
8	Stefan Mutter (SUI)	TI–Raleigh–McGregor	+ 16' 23"
9	Robert Alban (FRA)	Fiat	+ 16' 51"
10	Mariano Martínez (FRA)	La Redoute–Motobécane	+ 16' 52"
