= 1979 La Flèche Wallonne =

Race details
- Dates: 10 April 1979
- Stages: 1
- Distance: 248 km (154.1 mi)
- Winning time: 6h 14' 00"

Results
	Winner	Bernard Hinault (FRA)	(Renault–Gitane)
	Second	Giuseppe Saronni (ITA)	(Scic–Bottecchia)
	Third	Bernt Johansson (SWE)	(Magniflex–Famcucine)

The 1979 La Flèche Wallonne was the 43rd edition of La Flèche Wallonne cycle race and was held on 10 April 1979. The race started in Esneux and finished in Marcinelle. The race was won by Bernard Hinault of the Renault team.

== General classification ==
Final general classification

Rank	Rider	Team	Time
1	Bernard Hinault (FRA)	Renault–Gitane	6h 14' 00"
2	Giuseppe Saronni (ITA)	Scic–Bottecchia	+ 0"
3	Bernt Johansson (SWE)	Magniflex–Famcucine	+ 0"
4	Marc Demeyer (BEL)	Flandria–Ça va seul	+ 17"
5	Alfons De Wolf (BEL)	Lano–Boule d'Or	+ 17"
6	Marc Renier (BEL)	Kas–Campagnolo	+ 17"
7	Joop Zoetemelk (NED)	Miko–Mercier–Vivagel	+ 17"
8	René Bittinger (FRA)	Flandria–Ça va seul	+ 17"
9	Hennie Kuiper (NED)	Peugeot–Esso–Michelin	+ 17"
10	Willy Teirlinck (BEL)	Kas–Campagnolo	+ 17"
