= 1984 Critérium du Dauphiné Libéré =

Race details
- Dates: 28 May – 4 June 1984
- Stages: 7 + Prologue
- Distance: 1,266.8 km (787.2 mi)
- Winning time: 35h 23' 11"

Results
Jersey awarded to the overall winner	Winner	Martín Ramírez (COL)	(Colombia)
	Second	Bernard Hinault (FRA)	(La Vie Claire)
	Third	Greg LeMond (USA)	(Renault–Elf)
Jersey awarded to the points classification winner	Points	Stephen Roche (IRL)	(La Redoute)
Jersey awarded to the mountains classification winner	Mountains	Bernard Hinault (FRA)	(La Vie Claire)

The 1984 Critérium du Dauphiné Libéré was the 36th edition of the cycle race and was held from 28 May to 4 June 1984. The race started in Villeurbanne and finished in Vals-les-Bains. The race was won by Martín Ramírez of the Colombia team.

== Teams ==
Eleven teams, containing a total of 89 riders, participated in the race:

- COOP–Hoonved
- La Redoute
- La Vie Claire
- Panasonic–Raleigh
- Peugeot–Shell–Michelin
- Renault–Elf
- Skil–Reydel–Sem–Mavic
- Système U
- Teka
- Tönissteiner–Lotto–Mavic
- Colombia team

== Route ==
Stage characteristics and winners
Stage	Date	Course	Distance	Type	Stage winner
P	28 May 1984	Villeurbanne	3.3 km (2.1 mi)	Individual time trial	Allan Peiper (AUS)
1a	29 May 1984	Villeurbanne to Beaurepaire	102 km (63 mi)		Gerard Veldscholten (NED)
1b	29 May 1984	Beaurepaire to Saint-Étienne	83 km (52 mi)		Benny Van Brabant (BEL)
2	30 May 1984	Saint-Étienne to Charnay-lès-Mâcon	202 km (126 mi)		Guy Gallopin (FRA)
3	31 May 1984	Mâcon to Saint-Julien-en-Genevois	216 km (134 mi)		Francisco Rodríguez (COL)
4	1 June 1984	Saint-Julien-en-Genevois to Chambéry	192 km (119 mi)		Michel Laurent (FRA)
5	2 June 1984	Chambéry to Fontanil	154 km (96 mi)		Francisco Rodríguez (COL)
6	3 June 1984	Fontanil to Col de Rousset	178.5 km (110.9 mi)		Phil Anderson (AUS)
7a	4 June 1984	Saint-Paul-Trois-Châteaux to Privas	104 km (65 mi)		Guy Nulens (BEL)
7b	4 June 1984	Privas to Vals-les-Bains	32 km (20 mi)	Individual time trial	Greg LeMond (USA)

== General classification ==
Final general classification

Rank	Rider	Team	Time
1	Martín Ramírez (COL)	Colombia	35h 23' 11"
2	Bernard Hinault (FRA)	La Vie Claire	+ 27"
3	Greg LeMond (USA)	Renault–Elf	+ 5' 07"
4	Pascal Simon (FRA)	Peugeot–Shell–Michelin	+ 6' 33"
5	Niki Rüttimann (SUI)	La Vie Claire	+ 10' 41"
6	Stephen Roche (IRL)	La Redoute	+ 11' 59"
7	Phil Anderson (AUS)	Panasonic–Raleigh	+ 13' 49"
8	Michel Laurent (FRA)	COOP–Hoonved	+ 16' 36"
9	Gilles Mas (FRA)	Skil–Reydel–Sem–Mavic	+ 16' 59"
10	Dominique Garde (FRA)	Peugeot–Shell–Michelin	+ 18' 19"
