= 1980 UCI Road World Championships – Men's road race =

Men's Individual Road Race
1980 UCI Road World Championships
- Rainbow jersey

Race details
- Dates: 31 August 1980
- Stages: 1
- Distance: 268 km (166.5 mi)
- Winning time: 7h 32' 16"

Results
	Winner	Bernard Hinault (FRA)	(France)
	Second	Gianbattista Baronchelli (ITA)	(Italy)
	Third	Juan Fernández (ESP)	(Spain)

The men's road race at the 1980 UCI Road World Championships was the 47th edition of the event. The race took place on Sunday 31 August 1980 in Sallanches, France. The race was won by Bernard Hinault of France.

== Final classification ==
General classification (1–10)

Rank	Rider	Time
1st place, gold medalist(s)	Bernard Hinault (FRA)	7h 32' 16"
2nd place, silver medalist(s)	Gianbattista Baronchelli (ITA)	+ 1' 01"
3rd place, bronze medalist(s)	Juan Fernández (ESP)	+ 4' 25"
4	Wladimiro Panizza (ITA)	+ 4' 25"
5	Jonathan Boyer (USA)	+ 4' 25"
6	Bert Pronk (NED)	+ 4' 25"
7	Roger De Vlaeminck (BEL)	+ 4' 25"
8	Jørgen Marcussen (DEN)	+ 4' 25"
9	Sven-Åke Nilsson (SWE)	+ 4' 25"
10	Giovanni Battaglin (ITA)	+ 8' 34"
