= 1980 La Flèche Wallonne =

Race details
- Dates: 17 April 1980
- Stages: 1
- Distance: 248 km (154.1 mi)
- Winning time: 6h 29' 00"

Results
	Winner	Giuseppe Saronni (ITA)	(Gis Gelati)
	Second	Sven-Åke Nilsson (SWE)	(Miko–Mercier–Vivagel)
	Third	Bernard Hinault (FRA)	(Renault–Gitane)

The 1980 La Flèche Wallonne was the 44th edition of La Flèche Wallonne cycle race and was held on 17 April 1980. The race started in Mons and finished in Spa. The race was won by Giuseppe Saronni of the Gis Gelati team.

== General classification ==
Final general classification

Rank	Rider	Team	Time
1	Giuseppe Saronni (ITA)	Gis Gelati	6h 29' 00"
2	Sven-Åke Nilsson (SWE)	Miko–Mercier–Vivagel	+ 2"
3	Bernard Hinault (FRA)	Renault–Gitane	+ 1' 40"
4	Guido Van Calster (BEL)	Splendor–Admiral	+ 1' 40"
5	Jean-René Bernaudeau (FRA)	Renault–Gitane	+ 1' 40"
6	Henk Lubberding (NED)	TI–Raleigh–Creda	+ 1' 40"
7	Hennie Kuiper (NED)	Peugeot–Esso–Michelin	+ 1' 40"
8	Jo Maas (NED)	DAF Trucks–Lejeune	+ 1' 40"
9	Gianbattista Baronchelli (ITA)	Bianchi–Piaggio	+ 1' 40"
10	Joop Zoetemelk (NED)	TI–Raleigh–Creda	+ 1' 40"
