= 1977 Gent–Wevelgem =

Race details
- Dates: 19 April 1977
- Stages: 1
- Distance: 277 km (172 mi)
- Winning time: 6h 43' 00"

Results
	Winner	Bernard Hinault (FRA)	(Gitane–Campagnolo)
	Second	Vittorio Algeri (ITA)	(GBC)
	Third	Piet van Katwijk (NED)	(TI–Raleigh)

The 1977 Gent–Wevelgem was the 39th edition of the Belgian Gent–Wevelgem cycle race and was held on 19 April 1977. The race started in Ghent and finished in Wevelgem. The race was won by Bernard Hinault of the Gitane–Campagnolo team.

== General classification ==
Final general classification

Rank	Rider	Team	Time
1	Bernard Hinault (FRA)	Gitane–Campagnolo	6h 43' 00"
2	Vittorio Algeri (ITA)	GBC	+ 1' 24"
3	Piet van Katwijk (NED)	TI–Raleigh	+ 1' 58"
4	Walter Godefroot (BEL)	IJsboerke–Colnago	+ 1' 58"
5	Willy Teirlinck (BEL)	Gitane–Campagnolo	+ 1' 58"
6	André Dierickx (BEL)	Maes Pils–Mini-Flat	+ 1' 58"
7	Patrick Béon (FRA)	Peugeot–Esso–Michelin	+ 2' 00"
8	Ludo Peeters (BEL)	IJsboerke–Colnago	+ 3' 00"
9	Pierino Gavazzi (ITA)	Jollj Ceramica	+ 3' 50"
10	Jan Raas (NED)	Frisol–Thirion–Gazelle	+ 3' 50"
