= 1977 Liège–Bastogne–Liège =

Race details
- Dates: 24 April 1977
- Stages: 1
- Distance: 243.5 km (151.3 mi)
- Winning time: 6h 28'

Results
	Winner	Bernard Hinault (FRA)	(Gitane–Campagnolo)
	Second	André Dierickx (BEL)	(Maes–Mini Flat)
	Third	Dietrich Thurau (GER)	(TI–Raleigh)

The 63rd edition of the Liège–Bastogne–Liège road cycling race in Belgium was held on 24 April 1977. French rider Bernard Hinault won his first monument classic, after beating André Dierickx in a two-man sprint.

== Summary ==
Six riders – Eddy Merckx, Roger De Vlaeminck, Freddy Maertens, André Dierickx, Dietrich Thurau and Bernard Hinault – were in front of the race. While all eyes were on Eddy Merckx, André Dierickx launched an attack at 8 km from the finish. Frenchman Bernard Hinault was the only one to respond and beat Dierickx in the sprint. A faltering Merckx, in his final display in Liège, finished a disappointing sixth.

The race was run in bad weather, with cold and rain affecting riders. Only 24 of 143 riders finished the race.

== Results ==
#	Rider	Time
1	(France) Bernard Hinault	6 h 28 min 00 s
2	(Belgium) André Dierickx	s.t.
3	(Germany) Dietrich Thurau	+ 10 s
4	(Belgium) Roger De Vlaeminck	s.t.
5	(Belgium) Freddy Maertens	s.t.
6	(Belgium) Eddy Merckx	s.t.
7	(Belgium) Frans Verbeeck	+ 6 min 39 s
8	(Belgium) Michel Pollentier	s.t.
9	(Belgium) Ronald de Witte	s.t.
10	(Belgium) Joseph Bruyère	s.t.
