= Joaquim Agostinho =

Portuguese cyclist (1943–1984)

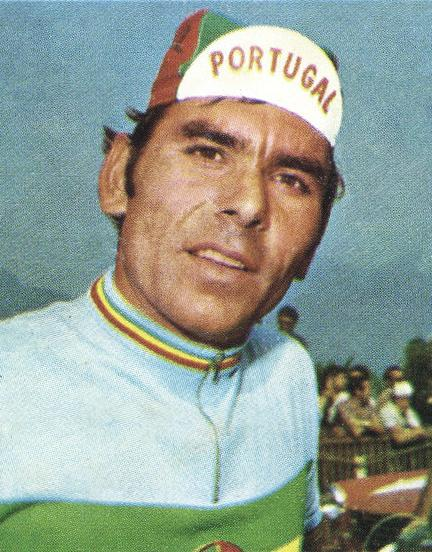
- Agostinho in 1972

Personal information
- Full name: Joaquim Francisco Fernandes Agostinho
- Nickname: Tinho
- Born: 7 April 1943 Torres Vedras, Portugal
- Died: 10 May 1984 (aged 41) Lisbon, Portugal

Cycling career
- Sport: Cycling
- Discipline: Road
- Role: Rider

Professional teams
- 1968: Sporting Clube de Portugal
- 1969–1970: Frimatic
- 1971: Hoover
- 1972: Magniflex
- 1973: Sporting Clube de Portugal, Bic
- 1974: Bic
- 1975: Sporting Clube de Portugal
- 1976–1977: Teka
- 1978–1979: Flandria
- 1980: Puch
- 1981–1983: Sem France Loire
- 1984: Sporting Clube de Portugal

Major wins
- Grand Tours Tour de France 4 individual stages (1969, 1973, 1979) Vuelta a España 3 individual stages (1974, 1976) Stage races Volta a Portugal General classification (1970, 1971, 1972) 24 individual stages (1970, 1971, 1972, 1973) One-day races and Classics Trofeo Baracchi (1969) National Road Race Championships (1968–1973) National Time Trial Championships (1968–1973)

Joaquim Francisco Fernandes Agostinho, OIH (7 April 1943 – 10 May 1984) was a Portuguese professional bicycle racer. He was champion of Portugal in six successive years. He rode the Tour de France 13 times and finished all but once, winning on Alpe d'Huez in 1979, and finishing third twice. All total he finished in the top 10 of a Grand Tour eleven times, made three podiums and won a total of seven stages between the Vuelta and Tour.

== Youth ==
Agostinho was born in a small village, near Torres Vedras. He lived for several years in Casalinhos de Alfaiata. Out for a ride as a youth, he encountered Sporting Clube de Portugal's cycling team on a road near Casalinhos de Alfaiata – Torres Vedras. He began an impromptu race; the team could not catch him, even though Agostinho was riding a standard steel bicycle.

Agostinho fought for three years with the Portuguese army in Angola and Mozambique during the Portuguese Colonial War of 1961–1974. Jean-Pierre Douçot, who became his mechanic as a professional, said:

"It was his captain during the war in Mozambique who discovered him. When he carried messages on a heavy bike, he took two hours to ride 50km when the others took five."

== Racing career ==
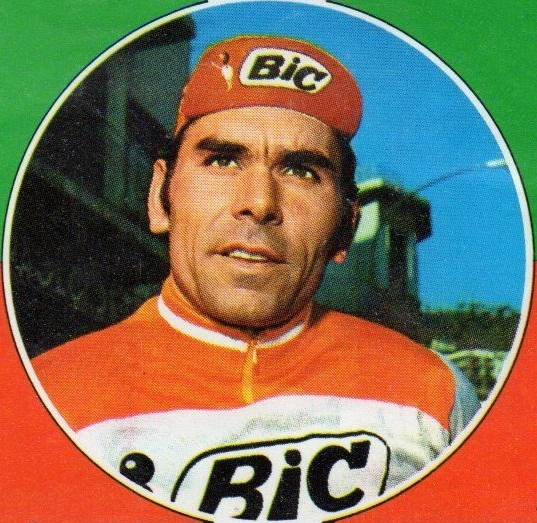
Agostinho in 1973

Joaquim Agostinho started racing as an amateur at the age of 25 years in some Portuguese races, wearing some borrowed cycling wear lent by João Roque. After winning some races, Agostinho signed a professional contract with Sporting Clube de Portugal. Then, when racing with the Sporting Clube de Portugal cycling team in São Paulo, Agostinho – a rider "of average height but with the build of a rhinoceros", according to the historian Pierre Chany – left Jean de Gribaldy, a team manager and former cyclist, in awe of him. They met in Brazil in 1968, when Agostinho won the Tour de São Paulo. De Gribaldy was managing an amateur team in the race. That year Agostinho rode the world professional road championship at Imola and came 16th after initiating the move which brought victory for the Italian, Vittorio Adorni. De Gribaldy and Agostinho became lifelong friends. De Gribaldy said in 1980:

"At the end of my life, if I had to recall a single place in the world, I wouldn't hesitate long. I would choose the little Brazilian hotel, insignificant, discreet, in São Paulo, where I had arranged to meet Joaquim. It was in 1968. I had noticed him two months earlier at Imola, at the world championship, but it was in São Paulo that I spoke to him for the first time. I asked him simply: 'Do you want to come and race in France?' He didn't know a word of French but in his smile I understood immediately what he was trying to answer. What a long way we went together afterwards. What memories we created together."

De Gribaldy asked him to join his Frimatic team in France, promising a ride in the 1969 Tour de France. Agostinho was already 26, a late age to turn professional, he won two stages that year. He also had one of the heavy falls that characterised his career, crashing on the cinder track at Divonne-les-Bains and being carried away with concussion, amnesia and cuts. He restarted next morning and rode as far as Paris, finishing the race eighth. He rode 13 Tours de France from 1969 to 1983, came third in 1978 and 1979 and won four stages. He finished 12 times.

Agostinho stayed with de Gribaldy as his teams were successively sponsored by Frimatic, Hoover, and Van Cauter Magniflex. In 1973 he left de Gribaldy to ride for Bic and then Teka before re-associating with de Gribaldy when he joined Flandria's French team in 1978.

Raphaël Géminiani said:

"Joaquim Agostinho didn't know his own strength. He was a ball of muscles of out-of-the-ordinary power. He was built like a cast-iron founder. Having come to cycling fairly late, he had trouble integrating with it. It's a shame he didn't want to dedicate himself 100 per cent to being a professional cyclist. Now and then he showed his very great physical powers, but no more often than that. He didn't want to do more. The peloton scared him, which is why he fell so often. More than that, Tinho was never aggressive enough to impose himself totally. He had a legendary kindness and his only ambition was to be good, gentle Tinho. If he'd been ambitious, he would easily have written his name into the records of the Tour de France."

Pierre Martin said in International Cycle Sport:

He was a man of strange contradictions. Built like a sprinter, he was no good at sprinting. He was one of the great climbers. Eddy Merckx said in 1969, the year when he and Agostinho made their debuts in the Tour de France, that Agostinho was the rival who worried him most, indeed the only rival who had worried him at all."

Agostinho was Portuguese champion in six successive years, from 1968 to 1973. He was a gifted climber and a consistent leader in both in the Vuelta a España and the Tour de France where he was a winner at Alpe d'Huez. Martin said:

"He loved the Tour de France. There were few other races which he took seriously, indeed he raced relatively little during an average season – enough to pay for and maintain life's dream, but no more. On the roads of the Tour, nobody ever knew when he would suddenly burst into action. He might be quiet for days on end, when suddenly the racing fever would grip him, not always in the mountains, and away he went. When he went, those with serious ambitions went with him, knowing that, otherwise, they would see him no more until the end of the stage. He didn't take cycling too seriously. It had brought him wealth and security, had allowed him to buy and stock a large farm about 20 miles from Lisbon. The farm and his family were his life; cycling was his hobby. When he was riding the Tour d'Indre-et-Loire once, news reached him that 20 cows had been stolen. Off he went, in mid-race, back to Portugal to organise a posse to hunt the cattle, chartering a light plane for himself to direct the search.

In 1982 he took a whole year off to look after his farm, demoralised by a fall in form the previous season.

== Doping ==
Joaquim Agostinho was caught three times in drugs checks: in the Tour of Portugal in 1969 and 1973, and the Tour de France of 1977.

== Death ==
Agostinho was leading the Tour of the Algarve at Quarteira in April 1984 when a dog ran into the road a few hundred metres before the finish. Agostinho hit it and fell to the ground, hitting his head. He remounted and crossed the line accompanied by other riders. He was dazed but seemed otherwise unhurt. He walked to an ambulance, holding his head. He then went to a hotel, where his head was dressed in ice. Two hours later he was taken to hospital in Faro, where an X-ray showed he had broken the parietal bone in his skull. He was conveyed by ambulance, four hours after the fall, 280 km to Lisbon, the nearest city that could treat him. He fell into a coma in the ambulance and subsequently died.

== Monuments & tributes ==
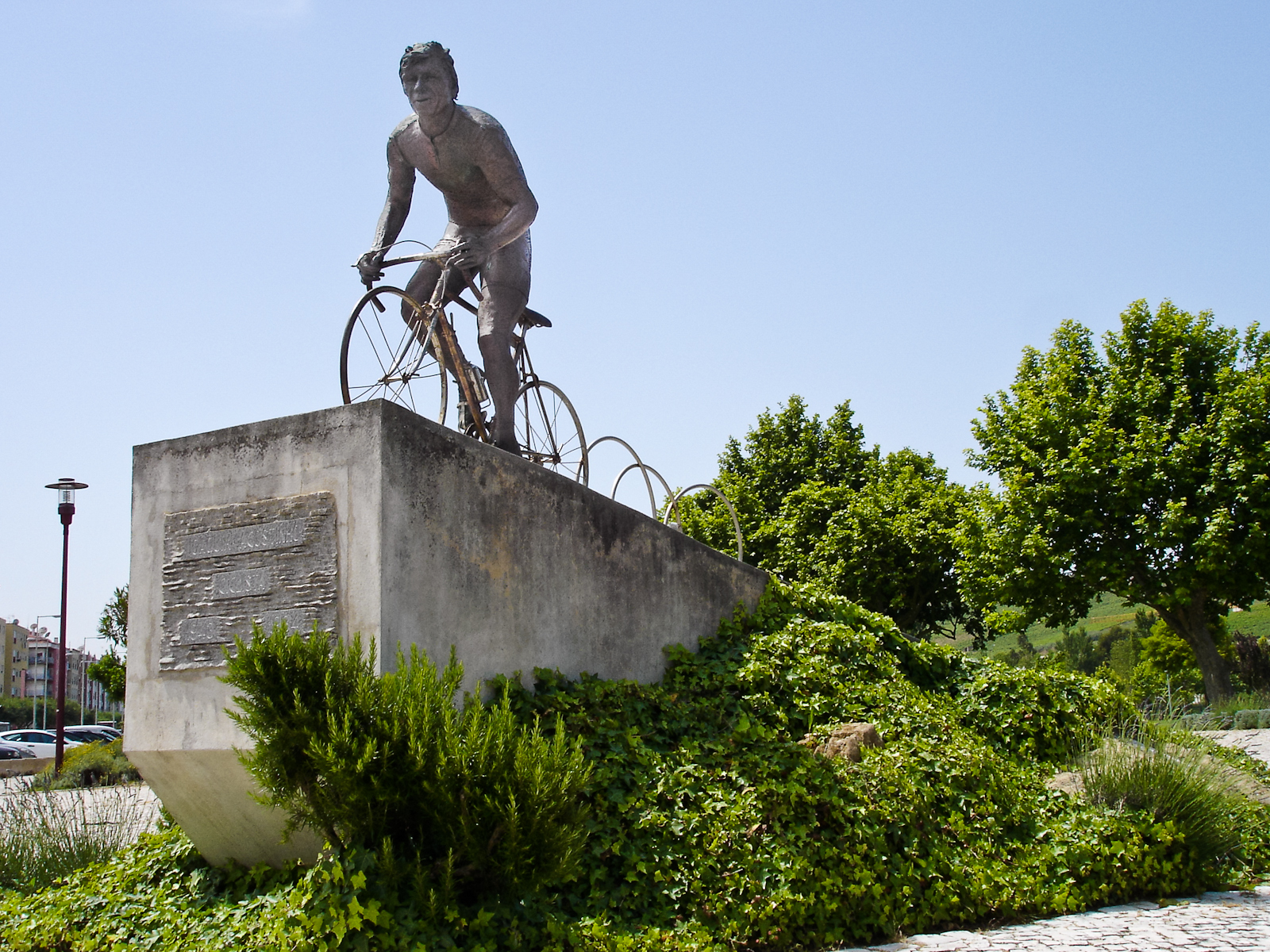
Monument of Joaquim Agostinho in Torres Vedras, Portugal

- In Torres Vedras, on top of the Parque Verde da Várzea, there is a monument built in honour of Joaquim Agostinho.
- In the gardens of Silveira a monument was inaugurated on 14 May 1989.
- The 'Avenida Joaquim Agostinho' (avenue) leads to the centre the Santa Cruz Beach.
- In France, on the 14th curve of the Alpe d'Huez, a bronze bust (1.70 m high, 70 cm wide and weighing 70 kg), mounted on a granite pedestal three feet high, commemorates his stage victory in 1979.
- In 2000 the journalists of A Bola selected Agostinho as the 4th most important Portuguese Sportsman of the 20th Century, behind Eusébio (1st), Carlos Lopes (2nd) and Rosa Mota (3rd).
- In 1984 Agostinho was made an Officer of the Order of Prince Henry the Navigator, by then President of Portugal Ramalho Eanes.

== Career achievements ==
=== Major results ===
1968
National Road Championships

1st Time trial
1st Road race

2nd Overall Volta a Portugal
1969
National Road Championships

1st Time trial
1st Road race

1st Trofeo Baracchi (with Herman Van Springel)
1st Stage 4b Tour de Luxembourg (ITT)
5th Overall À travers Lausanne
5th Grand Prix des Nations
7th Overall Volta a Portugal
8th Overall Tour de France

1st Stages 5 & 14

1970
National Road Championships

1st Time trial
1st Road race

1st Overall Volta a Portugal

1st Stages 8a, 14a, 14b (ITT) & 16b

1st Stage 1a Setmana Catalana de Ciclisme
3rd Overall Escalada a Montjuïc
3rd Overall Trophée d'Europe de la Montagne
6th Overall Vuelta a Mallorca
1971
National Road Championships

1st Time trial
1st Road race

1st Overall Volta a Portugal

1st Stages 1, 2a, 4b, 7b, 11a, 12, 13a, 16b (ITT)

1st Overall GP de Sintra

1st Stages 1a & 1b

3rd Overall À travers Lausanne
5th Overall Tour de France
6th Baden-Baden
1972
National Road Championships

1st Time trial
1st Road race

1st Overall Volta a Portugal

1st Stages 8, 10, 13, 17 & 24 (ITT)

1st Overall GP de Sintra

1st Stage 2

5th Overall Tour de Suisse

1st Stages 3 (ITT) & 8b (ITT)

8th Overall Tour de France
1973
National Road Championships

1st Time trial
1st Road race

Volta a Portugal

1st Prologue & Stages 3b, 5, 9a (ITT), 10, 11b, 15

5th Overall GP du Midi-Libre
5th Subida a Arrate
6th Overall Vuelta a España
8th Overall Tour de France

1st Stage 16b (ITT)

1974
2nd Overall Vuelta a España

1st Stages 14 & 19b (ITT)

3rd Overall Setmana Catalana de Ciclisme
6th Overall Tour de France
7th Overall GP du Midi-Libre
1975
3rd Overall Tour de l'Aude
1976
3rd Overall Tour of the Basque Country
3rd Overall Volta a la Comunitat Valenciana
3rd Overall Escalada a Montjuïc
6th Overall Setmana Catalana de Ciclisme
7th Overall Vuelta a España

1st Stage 6 (ITT)
Held after Stages 6-8 & 15-16

1977
~~1st Stage 18 Tour de France~~
Vuelta a los Valles Mineros

1st Stages 3a & 3b

4th Overall Critérium du Dauphiné Libéré
4th Overall Setmana Catalana de Ciclisme
7th Overall Volta a la Comunitat Valenciana
1978
3rd Overall Tour de France
3rd Overall Tour de Corse
1979
2nd Overall GP du Midi-Libre

1st Stage 2

3rd Overall Tour de France

1st Stage 17

6th Overall Critérium du Dauphiné Libéré
1980
2nd Overall GP du Midi-Libre
3rd Overall Critérium du Dauphiné Libéré
3rd Overall 4 Jours de Dunkerque
3rd Overall Escalada a Montjuïc
3rd Overall Tour de Corse
3rd Bordeaux–Paris
4th GP Eddy Merckx
5th Overall Tour de France
1981
2nd Overall Critérium du Dauphiné Libéré
5th Overall Tour de Romandie
1984
1st Stage 3 Volta ao Algarve

=== Grand Tour results ===
Grand Tour	1969	1970	1971	1972	1973	1974	1975	1976	1977	1978	1979	1980	1981	1982	1983
Vuelta a España	–	–	–	DNF	6	2	–	7	15	–	–	–	–	–	–
Giro d'Italia	–	–	–	–	–	–	–	DNF	–	–	–	–	–	–	–
Tour de France	8	14	5	8	8	6	15	–	13	3	3	5	DNF	–	11

== See also ==
- List of doping cases in cycling
