= 1981 Paris–Roubaix =

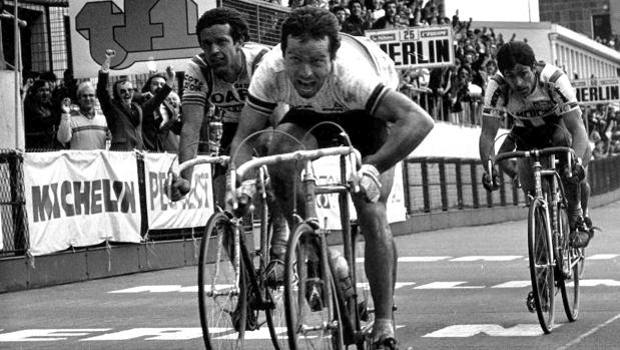
- Hinault finishing before De Vlaeminck and Moser

Race details
- Dates: April 12, 1981
- Stages: 1
- Distance: 263 km (163.4 mi)
- Winning time: 6h 26' 07"

Results
	Winner	Bernard Hinault (FRA)	(Renault)
	Second	Roger De Vlaeminck (BEL)	(DAF Trucks)
	Third	Francesco Moser (ITA)	(Famcucine)

The 1981 Paris–Roubaix was ultimately settled in a 6-man sprint on the velodrome in Roubaix with Bernard Hinault prevailing in front of former four times winner Roger De Vlaeminck and reigning three times winner Francesco Moser.

With about 8 kilometres to go, Bernard Hinault attempted to break away, but was hauled in by Hennie Kuiper acting for Roger De Vlaeminck. Bernard Hinault then crashed with few kilometres to go, but quickly got on his bike and re-joined the front group before the last kilometre.

In the velodrome, Hennie Kuiper took the lead to favour the sprint of De Vlaeminck. Hinault took charge with about a lap to go and initiated a long sprint. In the end, he was able to resist the charge from Roger De Vlaeminck, and became the first French winner of the Paris–Roubaix for 25 years.

== Results ==
	Cyclist	Team	Time
1	Bernard Hinault (FRA)	Renault–Elf–Gitane	6h 26'07"
2	Roger De Vlaeminck (BEL)	Daf–Côte d'Or–Gazelle	s.t.
3	Francesco Moser (ITA)	Famcucine–Moser	s.t.
4	Guido Van Calster (BEL)	Wickes–Splendor	s.t.
5	Marc Demeyer (BEL)	Capri Sonne–Koga Miyata	s.t.
6	Hennie Kuiper (NED)	Daf–Côte d'Or–Gazelle	s.t.
7	Ferdi Van Den Haute (BEL)	La Redoute	at 1'01
8	René Bittinger (FRA)	Miko–Mercier–Vivage	at 1'01
9	Jean Chassang (FRA)	Puch-Wolber	at 2'09
10	Fons De Wolf (BEL)	Vermeer–Thijs–Gios	at 2'35
