= Alessandro Pozzi =

Italian cyclist

Personal information
- Born: 24 December 1954 (age 71) Lombardy, Italy

Cycling career
- Sport: Cycling
- Discipline: Road
- Role: Rider

Professional teams
- 1979–1980: Bianchi–Faema
- 1981: Sammontana–Benotto
- 1982–1984: Bianchi–Piaggio
- 1985: Ariostea–Oece
- 1986: Gis Gelati
- 1987: Del Tongo
- 1988–1989: Chateau d'Ax

Alessandro Pozzi (born 24 December 1954) is an Italian former professional racing cyclist. He rode in four editions of the Tour de France.

== Major results ==
1978
2nd Overall Giro Ciclistico d'Italia
3rd GP Palio del Recioto
5th Overall Tour de l'Avenir
1979
7th Giro di Lombardia
8th Giro di Romagna
1981
5th Giro di Toscana
1982
6th Overall Tour of Sweden

1st Stage 5

7th Tre Valli Varesine
1998
1st Overall Herald Sun Tour
1999
2nd GP Citta di Rio Saliceto e Correggio
