= Martín Ramírez (cyclist) =

Colombian cyclist

Personal information
- Full name: Martín Alonso Ramírez Ramírez
- Nickname: El Negro
- Born: November 8, 1960 (age 65) Bogotá, Colombia

Cycling career
- Sport: Cycling
- Discipline: Road
- Role: Rider

Amateur team
- 1984: Varta

Professional teams
- 1984: Système U
- 1985: Varta
- 1986: Fagor
- 1987–1989: Café de Colombia–Varta
- 1990: Pony Malta–Avianca

Major wins
- Stage races Critérium du Dauphiné Libéré (1984)

Martín Alonso Ramírez Ramírez (born November 8, 1960) is a Colombian former road bicycle racer. He won the Critérium du Dauphiné Libéré in 1984. His mother was a homemaker while his father was a construction worker. Feeling the intense need and desire to earn an income, at age 16 he decided to work as a delivery man for a well known drug store in Bogotá, called the Ultramar. It was here that he picked up a passion for cycling.

== Major results ==
1982
1st Stage 6 Vuelta a Colombia
1st Stage 1 Coors Classic
1984
1st Overall Critérium du Dauphiné Libéré
4th Overall Clásico RCN

1st Prologue

1985
1st Overall Tour de l'Avenir

1st Stage 8

1987
9th Overall Setmana Catalana de Ciclisme
1990
1st Stage 5 Clásico RCN

=== Grand Tour general classification results timeline ===
Grand Tour	1984	1985	1986	1987	1988	1989	1990
Giro d'Italia	—	—	DNF	—	—	—	—
Tour de France	DNF	—	42	13	DNF	DNF	—
Vuelta a España	—	23	—	18	16	12	45
