= Tour d'Indre-et-Loire =

Bicycle race

Race details
- Date: April
- Region: Indre-et-Loire, France
- English name: Tour of Indre-et-Loire
- Discipline: Road
- Type: Stage race

History
- First edition: 1970
- Editions: 13
- Final edition: 1982
- First winner: Ercole Gualazzini (ITA)
- Final winner: Patrick Perret (FRA)

The Tour d'Indre-et-Loire was a multi-day road bicycle race held annually from 1970 to 1982 in the department of Indre-et-Loire, France.

== Winners ==
Year	Winner	Second	Third
1970	(Italy) Ercole Gualazzini	(Luxembourg) Johny Schleck	(France) Jacques Cadiou
1971	(France) Daniel Proust	(France) Christian Raymond	(Netherlands) Jan Krekels
1972	(France) Bernard Thévenet	(Belgium) Noël Van Clooster	(France) José Catieau
1973	(France) Yves Hézard	(France) Cyrille Guimard	(Germany) Jürgen Tschan
1974	(Netherlands) Hennie Kuiper	(France) Gérard Moneyron	(France) Christian Raymond
1975	(Netherlands) Roy Schuiten	(Germany) Dietrich Thurau	(Netherlands) Gerrie Knetemann
1976	(France) Bernard Hinault	(France) Yves Hézard	(Netherlands) Roy Schuiten
1977	(France) Jean-Pierre Danguillaume	(France) Bernard Hinault	(Luxembourg) Roger Gilson
1978	(Italy) Giuseppe Saronni	(Netherlands) Henk Lubberding	(Belgium) Jean-Luc Vandenbroucke
1979	(Germany) Gregor Braun	(Netherlands) Henk Lubberding	(Netherlands) Bert Oosterbosch
1980	(Belgium) Jean-Luc Vandenbroucke	(Netherlands) Hennie Kuiper	(France) Jean-Louis Gauthier
1981	(Republic of Ireland) Stephen Roche	(France) Patrick Friou	(Germany) Henry Rinklin
1982	(France) Patrick Perret	(Netherlands) Ferdi Van Den Haute	(Belgium) Dominique Naessens
