= 1981 Amstel Gold Race =

Dutch cycling race

The 1981 Amstel Gold Race was the 16th edition of the annual Amstel Gold Race road bicycle race, held on Sunday April 2, 1981, in the Dutch province of Limburg. The race stretched 237 kilometres, with the start in Heerlen and the finish in Meerssen. There were a total of 160 competitors, and 60 cyclists finished the race.

== Result ==
Final result (1–10)
Rank	Rider	Time
1	Bernard Hinault (FRA)	5:57:49
2	Roger de Vlaeminck (BEL)	+ 0
3	Fons De Wolf (BEL)	+ 0
4	Rudy Pevenage (BEL)	+ 0
5	Jan Raas (NED)	+ 0
6	Sean Kelly (IRL)	+ 0
7	Phil Anderson (AUS)	+ 0
8	Pierino Gavazzi (ITA)	+ 0
9	Stefan Mutter (SUI)	+ 0
10	Roger de Cnijf (BEL)	+ 0
