= Jean de Gribaldy =

French cyclist

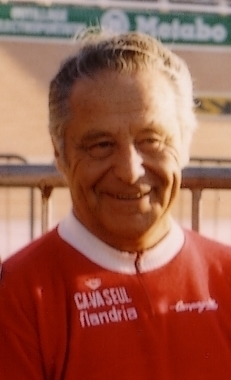
- Jean de Gribaldy, Besançon, September 1980

Personal information
- Full name: Jean de Gribaldy
- Nickname: Le Vicomte
- Born: 18 July 1922 Besançon, France
- Died: 2 January 1987 (aged 64) Voray-sur-l'Ognon, France

Cycling career
- Sport: Cycling
- Discipline: Road
- Role: Rider/Team leader
- Rider type: Climber

Professional teams
- 1945–1949: Peugeot–Dunlop
- 1950: Mervil
- 1951–1954: Terrot

Managerial teams
- 1964: Grammont–de Gribaldy
- 1965: Grammont–Motoconfort / Tigra–Meltina–de Gribaldy / Wolhauser Sirops Berger
- 1966: Tigra–Meltina–de Gribaldy
- 1967: Tigra–Grammont / Tigra–Enicar
- 1968: Frimatic–Viva–de Gribaldy/Tigra–Enicar
- 1969: Frimatic–Viva–de Gribaldy
- 1969: Frimatic–Viva–de Gribaldy–Wolber (Tour de France)
- 1970: Wolhauser–Ravis–de Gribaldy
- 1970: Frimatic–de Gribaldy
- 1971: Hoover–de Gribaldy
- 1972: Van Cauter–Magniflex–de Gribaldy
- 1975: Miko–de Gribaldy
- 1976: Miko–de Gribaldy–Superia
- 1977: Velda–Latina Assicurazioni–Flandria
- 1978: Velda–Lano–Flandria
- 1979: Flandria–Ça va seul
- 1980: Puch–Sem–Campagnolo
- 1981: Sem–France Loire–Campagnolo
- 1982: Sem–France Loire–Campagnolo
- 1983: Sem–France Loire–Mavic–Reydel
- 1984: Skil–Sem–Mavic–Reydel
- 1985: Skil–Reydel–Sem
- 1986: Kas–Mavic–Tag Heuer

Jean de Gribaldy (18 July 1922 – 2 January 1987) was a French road cyclist and directeur sportif. He rode in the Tour de France in 1947, 1948 and 1952.

== Biography ==
Born in Besançon, Doubs département, Gribaldi was a professional racing cyclist from 1945 to 1954. He began a successful career as a directeur sportif in the mid-1960s.

Nicknamed le Vicomte ("the Viscount") due to his aristocratic ancestry, he discovered Sean Kelly, Joaquim Agostinho, and Éric Caritoux. He gave a second chance to many riders dropped by other teams. Most saw their career take a new dimension under Jean de Gribaldy.

A street in Besançon, where he was a shopkeeper, has been named Montée Jean de Gribaldy since 1994. Each year, a Jean de Gribaldy cycling race is organized in Besançon.

On 26 June 2025, Grand Besançon Métropole unveiled 8 of these new trams, which will be in service from July 2025. They will be longer and have a capacity of 200 passengers, compared with 130 for the previous trams. One of them will bear the name of Jean de Gribaldy and will be decorated with his portrait and biography.

== Bibliography ==
- (in French) Pierre Diéterlé, Jean de Gribaldy, la légende du Vicomte, Editions du Sekoya, 2026 ISBN 978-2-84751-232-8
- (in French) Pierre Diéterlé, Jean de Gribaldy, la légende du Vicomte, Editions du Sekoya, 2014 ISBN 978-2-84751-137-6
