= 1980 UCI Road World Championships =

- Venue: Sallanches, France
- Date: 30–31 August 1980
- Coordinates: 45°56′14″N 6°37′58″E
- Events: 2

The 1980 UCI Road World Championships took place from 30–31 August 1980 in Sallanches, France. Only two races took place because of the Moscow Olympics. It was one of the toughest World Championship courses ever, featuring nearly 6000m of climbing over 20 laps of a 13 km course. The 2027 UCI Road World Championships will use a similar course.

In the same period, the 1980 UCI Track Cycling World Championships were organized in Besançon.

== Results ==
Race:	Gold:	Time	Silver:	Time	Bronze :	Time
Men
Men's road race	Bernard Hinault; France	7.32'16"	Gianbattista Baronchelli; Italy	1'01"	Juan Fernández Martín; Spain	4'25"
Women
Women's road race	Beth Heiden; United States	1.45'15"	Tuulikki Jahre; Sweden	same time	Mandy Jones; Great Britain	same time

== Medal table ==
Rank	Nation	Gold	Silver	Bronze	Total
1	France (FRA)	1	0	0	1
1	United States (USA)	1	0	0	1
3	Italy (ITA)	0	1	0	1
3	Sweden (SWE)	0	1	0	1
5	Great Britain (GBR)	0	0	1	1
5	Spain (ESP)	0	0	1	1
Totals (6 entries)		2	2	2	6
