= Sem–France Loire =

Team information
- UCI code: SEM
- Registered: France
- Founded: 1980
- Disbanded: 1984
- Disciplines: Road; Cyclo-cross

Key personnel
- General manager: Jean de Gribaldy

Team name history
- 1980 1981–1982 January–May 1983 May–December 1983: Puch–Sem–Campagnolo; Sem–France Loire–Campagnolo; Sem–France Loire–Mavic; Sem–Reydel–Mavic
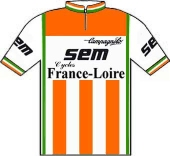
Sem–France Loire jersey
Jersey

The Sem–France Loire cycling team was a French professional cycling team that existed for four years from 1980 to 1983. Although a small team, directeur sportif Jean de Gribaldy directed the team to success in various classic races and in stage races such as Paris–Nice and the Tour de France as well as the French championships.

== History ==
The team formed under directeur sportif Jean de Gribaldy when he took the French section of the successful Belgian Flandria–Ça va seul team after Flandria withdrew sponsorship. De Gribaldy took Portuguese rider Joaquim Agostinho with him as team leader of his new team. With several sponsors, de Gribaldy formed a French team called Puch–Sem–Campagnolo. In the team's first year, Agostinho finished fifth in the 1980 Tour de France. The following year this team became known as Sem–France Loire when Sem took over as main sponsors. The highlight of the year for the team was when Serge Bucherie became road race champion of France. During the summer of 1981, Sean Kelly got in touch with his former directeur sportif about joining the team. De Gribaldy organised the necessary sponsorship and 1982 marked the return of Kelly to de Gribaldy which immediately translated into success. Kelly, who had been riding in a Belgian team with a Belgian leader in Eddy Planckaert, was now made the team leader. With this support behind him, Kelly went to the prestigious stage race Paris–Nice and won. Kelly continued that success by winning the points classification of the 1982 Tour de France. In 1983, he again won Paris–Nice and the points classification of the 1983 Tour de France, and, at the end of the season, triumphed in the Giro di Lombardia, one of the five monument races in cycling, his first. Sem was replaced as main sponsor in 1984 when the small power tool manufacturer Skil became the main sponsor making the Skil-Sem team.

== Major wins ==
- France Road Race Championship 1981
- Switzerland Cyclo Cross Championship 1981
- Paris–Camembert 1981
- Dagmersellen, Cyclocross 1981
- Paris–Nice 1982, 1983
- Giro di Lombardia 1983
- Liège–Bastogne–Liège 1983
- Nice–Alassio 1982, 1983
- Critérium International 1983
- Grand Prix d'Isbergues 1983
- Tour de Suisse 1983
