= Renault (cycling team) =

French cycling team (1978–1985)

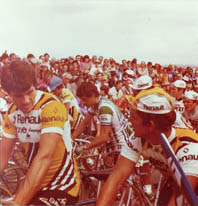
- Renault riders in 1978

Team information
- UCI code: REN
- Registered: France
- Founded: 1978
- Disbanded: 1985
- Disciplines: Road; Cyclo-cross

Key personnel
- General manager: Cyrille Guimard

Team name history
- 1978 1979–1980 1981–1982 1983–1985: Renault–Gitane–Campagnolo; Renault–Gitane; Renault–Elf–Gitane; Renault–Elf

Renault (UCI team code: REN) was a French professional cycling team that existed from 1978 to 1985. The team cycled on and promoted Gitane racing bikes.

== History ==
The team was created in 1978 after the Renault auto group purchased the Gitane bicycle manufacturer and became the main sponsor of the Gitane–Campagnolo cycling team that was directed by former French cycling champion Cyrille Guimard and featured the promising young cyclist Bernard Hinault.

From 1978 to 1980, the team was known as Renault–Gitane but, from 1981 to 1985, the team was Renault–Elf. Elf being an oil company that was owned by the Renault auto group.

During this time the team with Bernard Hinault dominated the sport from 1978 to 1983 with four wins in the Tour de France, two wins in the Vuelta a España and two wins in the Giro d'Italia. Hinault won several smaller stage races as well as one day races which included Liège–Bastogne–Liège, Paris–Roubaix, Giro di Lombardia, the Amstel Gold Race and the 1980 World Cycling Championships.

Guimard signed several American riders which included future Tour de France winner Greg LeMond. LeMond made an immediate impression with his third-place finish behind Hinault in the 1981 Critérium du Dauphiné Libéré. Hinault left the team at the end of 1983 after Renault–Elf teammate Laurent Fignon took over the designated team leader after winning the 1983 Tour de France.

Greg LeMond added to the team's laurels by winning the 1983 World Championship. The following year Fignon finished high in the Giro d'Italia, and then went on to become the 1984 French National Champion and winner of the 1984 Tour de France.

The dominance of the team began to wane in 1985, with Fignon suffering from persistent knee injury and rising star Greg LeMond leaving the team for Hinault's La Vie Claire team. The highlight of the 1985 season was Marc Madiot's win in the cobbled classic Paris–Roubaix.

After the 1985 season, the Renault auto group retired from sponsoring in the peloton and the French supermarket Système U became the main sponsor of Guimard's team. The team continued to ride on Gitane bicycle frames, who were co-sponsors for the Système U team.

== Major wins ==
1978
Overall Tour de France, Bernard Hinault

Stages 8, 15 & 20, Bernard Hinault

Overall Vuelta a España, Bernard Hinault
Grand Prix des Nations, Bernard Hinault

1979
Giro di Lombardia, Bernard Hinault
La Flèche Wallonne, Bernard Hinault
Overall Tour de France, Bernard Hinault

Stages 2 (ITT), 3, 11 (ITT), 15 (ITT), 21 (ITT) 23 & 24, Bernard Hinault
Stage 13, Pierre-Raymond Villemiane

Giro di Lombardia, Bernard Hinault
Overall Critérium du Dauphiné Libéré
Grand Prix des Nations, Bernard Hinault

1980
Paris–Camembert, Pierre-Raymond Villemiane
Liège–Bastogne–Liège, Bernard Hinault
Overall Giro d'Italia, Bernard Hinault

Stage 12, Yvon Bertin
Stage 14, Bernard Hinault
Stage 20, Jean-René Bernaudeau

Prologue & Stages 4 & 5 (ITT), Bernard Hinault

1981
Paris–Roubaix, Bernard Hinault
Amstel Gold Race, Bernard Hinault
Overall Tour de France, Bernard Hinault

Prologue & Stages 7 (ITT), 16, 20 & 22 (ITT), Bernard Hinault

Overall Critérium du Dauphiné Libéré, Bernard Hinault

1982
Grand Prix d'Ouverture La Marseillaise, Bernard Hinault
Overall Giro d'Italia, Bernard Hinault

Stage 11, Bernard Becaas

Stages 12, 18 & 22 (ITT), Bernard Hinault
Overall Tour de France, Bernard Hinault

Prologue & Stages 14, 19 (ITT) & 21, Bernard Hinault

Tour de l'Avenir, Greg LeMond
Grand Prix des Nations, Bernard Hinault

1983
La Flèche Wallonne, Bernard Hinault
Overall Tour de France, Laurent Fignon

Stage 5, Dominique Gaigne
Stage 9, Philippe Chevallier
Stage 21 (ITT), Laurent Fignon

Overall Vuelta a España, Bernard Hinault
Overall Critérium du Dauphiné Libéré, Greg LeMond

1984
Stage 10 Giro d'Italia, Martial Gayant
Stage 20 Giro d'Italia, Laurent Fignon
Overall Tour de France, Laurent Fignon

Stage 2, Marc Madiot
Stage 3a (TTT)
Stages 6 (ITT), 15 (ITT), 17, 19 & 21 (ITT), Laurent Fignon
Stage 7, Pascal Jules
Stage 11, Pascal Poisson
Stage 12, Pierre-Henri Menthéour

Tour de l'Avenir, Charly Mottet

1985
Grand Prix d'Ouverture La Marseillaise, Charly Mottet
Paris–Camembert, Martial Gayant
1985 Paris–Roubaix, Marc Madiot
Grand Prix des Nations, Charly Mottet

== National and world champions ==
1978
French National Road Race Championships, Bernard Hinault
French National Cyclo-cross Championships, Jean-Yves Plaisance

1979
French National Road Race Championships, Roland Berland
French National Cyclo-cross Championships, André Wilhelm

1980
World Road Race Championship, Bernard Hinault
French National Road Race Championships, Pierre-Raymond Villemiane
French National Cyclo-cross Championships, Alex Gerardin

1982
French National Cyclo-cross Championships, Marc Madiot

1983
World Road Race Championship, Greg LeMond
French National Cyclo-cross Championships, Martial Gayant

1984
French National Road Race Championships, Laurent Fignon
French National Cyclo-cross Championships, Yvon Madiot

1985
French National Cyclo-cross Championships, Yvon Madiot

== Notable riders ==
- Bernard Hinault
- Marc Madiot
- Laurent Fignon
- Greg LeMond
- Charly Mottet
- Vincent Barteau
- Éric Boyer
- Thierry Marie
- Hubert Arbès
