= Philippa York =

Scottish cyclist

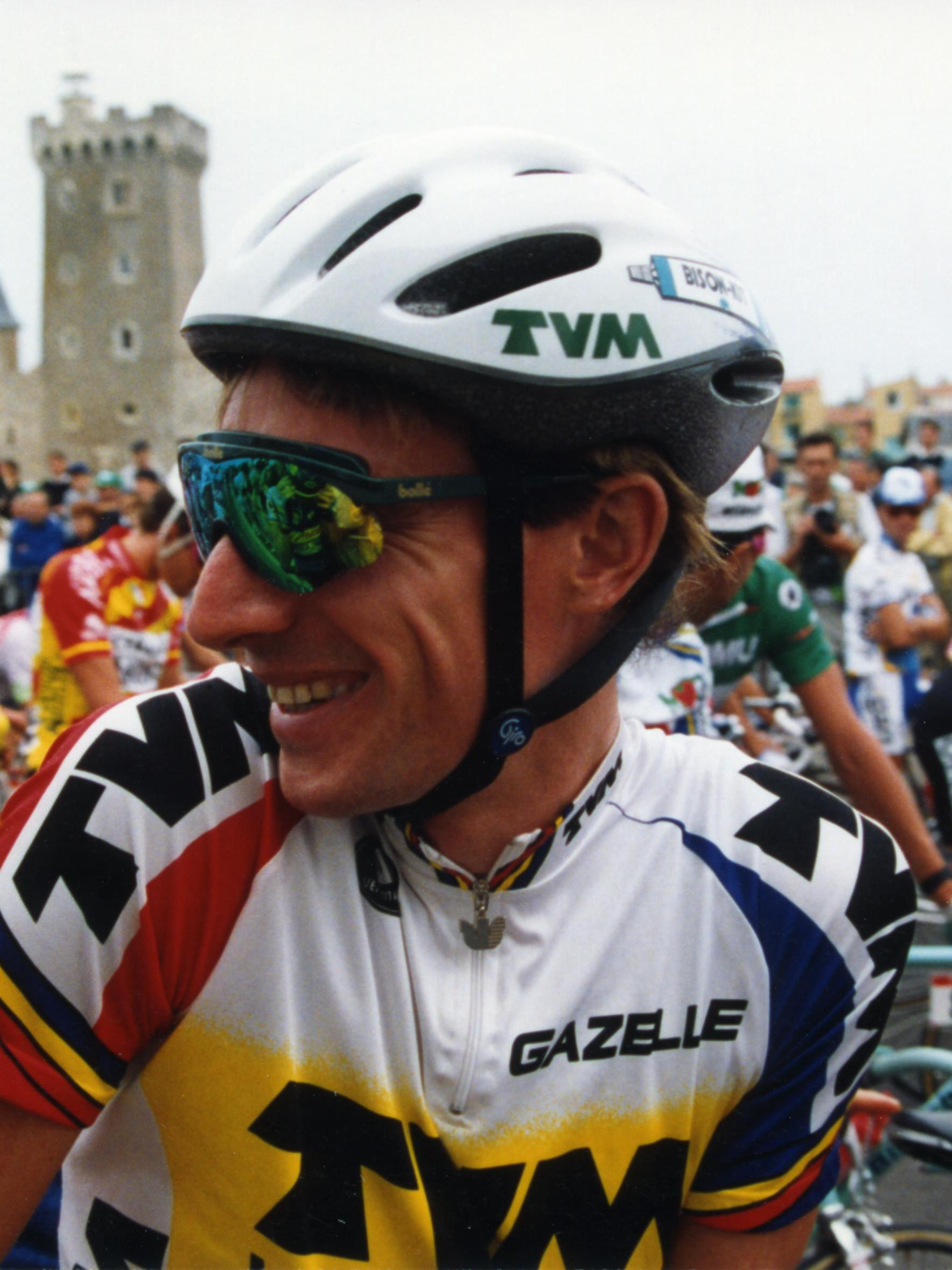
- York, as Robert Millar, at the 1993 Tour de France

Personal information
- Born: 13 September 1958 (age 68) Glasgow, Scotland

Cycling career
- Sport: Cycling
- Discipline: Road
- Role: Rider
- Rider type: Climbing specialist

Amateur teams
- Glenmarnock Wheelers
- Glasgow Wheelers
- ACBB

Professional teams
- 1980–1985: Peugeot–Esso–Michelin
- 1986–1987: Panasonic–Merckx–Agu
- 1988: Fagor–MBK
- 1989–1991: Z–Peugeot
- 1992–1994: TVM–Sanyo
- 1995: Le Groupement

Major wins
- Grand Tours Tour de France Mountains classification (1984) 3 individual stages (1983, 1984, 1989) Giro d'Italia Mountains classification (1987) 1 individual stage (1987) Vuelta a España Combination classification (1985) 1 individual stage (1986) Stage races Volta a Catalunya (1985) Tour of Britain (1989) Critérium du Dauphiné Libéré (1990) One-day races and Classics National Road Race Championships (1995)

Philippa York (born Robert Millar on 13 September 1958) is a Scottish journalist and former professional road racing cyclist.

York, who competed when known as Robert Millar, is one of Britain's most successful cyclists. York won the "King of the Mountains" competition in the 1984 Tour de France and finished fourth overall. This success was the first time a British rider won a major classification in the men's tour, (Note: This excludes Millie Robinson's victory in the first one-off Tour de France Féminin in 1955.) and was unsurpassed as the highest Tour finish for a Briton for over 20 years until Bradley Wiggins was retrospectively placed third in the 2009 Tour de France. York started the Tour de France eleven times, finishing eight times.

York finished second in the 1987 Giro d'Italia and also won the King of the Mountains classification. This was the highest finish by a Briton in the Giro d'Italia until Chris Froome won the 2018 race. As well as the Giro second-place finish, York finished second in two other Grand Tours: the 1985 and 1986 Vuelta a España. The second place at the 1985 Vuelta came after losing the leader's jersey on the penultimate stage, in what is widely thought to have been collusion by the Spanish-speaking teams. Further victories came at the 1985 Volta a Catalunya, the 1989 Tour of Britain and the 1990 Critérium du Dauphiné Libéré.

After retiring in 1995, York moved into journalism, as well as spending a year as a coach for British Cycling. She reduced her public commitments in 2000 following hostile stories regarding rumours of her gender transition, and after an appearance as Millar at the 2002 Commonwealth Games left public life altogether. In the 2010s, having transitioned to living as York, she returned to journalism, publishing under the name of Robert Millar, until a decision to reveal her transition publicly by appearing on television in 2017 in a commentary role.

== Early life and amateur career ==
York was born and raised in Glasgow, Scotland, as Robert Millar. At one time destined for a career as a factory engineer, York attended Shawlands Academy in the south of the city. In 2017, York revealed that she had first felt "different" aged five, but was unaware that this difference came from discomfort with having a male body.

She initially began riding for Glenmarnock Wheelers cycling club and quickly established herself as a leading amateur road racing rider. She was relatively small compared to her competitors, meaning she had comparatively less weight to carry uphill and she excelled as a specialist hill and mountain cyclist. She won the Scottish junior title in 1976 and was Scottish hill-climb champion the following year. In 1978, York established herself on the British scene. She was twenty-first in the Milk Race, and won the British amateur road race championship. She moved to France in 1979 to join the Athletic Club de Boulogne-Billancourt (A.C.B.B.), one of Europe's top amateur teams, and quickly began winning races such the Grand Prix de la Ville de Lillers.

In 1979, after retaining her British road title, taking fourth place in the world amateur road championship, claiming five wins in France and winning the French 'Best Amateur' Trophy, she turned professional for the Peugeot cycling team, and as a climbing specialist focused on single-day road races and stage races in hilly or mountainous terrain. York was happy to travel abroad and wasn't homesick. As Millar, she married a French woman and lived with her in France.

== Professional career ==
=== 1980–1982: early years ===
York's 1980 debut pro season included second in the Tour du Vaucluse to Michel Laurent and eighth in a race in which she would finish in the top ten overall in her career seven times, the Tour de Romandie. Returning home for the UK National Championship, she finished fifth. In 1981 she improved one place on the year before with her seventh place in the Tour de Romandie. 1981 was her first prominent finish in another race in which she would again consistently impress, the Critérium du Dauphiné Libéré. York finished seventh as per the Tour de Romandie and was the first of six occasions in which she would end the Dauphiné in the top ten in the General Classification.1982 saw York again finish seventh in the Tour de Romandie. In the second year of the under-23 Tour de l'Avenir being opened to professionals, York finished second to Greg LeMond.

=== 1983: Tour de France debut ===
In 1983 York came second in the Critérium du Dauphiné Libéré with LeMond again finishing a place above her. With her impressive June showing in the Dauphine, York was selected for the Tour de France for the first time. Any hopes of a high placing in the tour General Classification ended on stage three when she crashed losing seventeen minutes. 11 July was that year's tour first mountainous race crossing the Aubisque, Tourmalet, Aspin, and Peyresourde in the Pyrenees on stage ten. The only Pyrenean stage of that tour, York won the day six seconds ahead of Pedro Delgado. York finished fourteenth overall, twenty-three minutes behind the winner, Laurent Fignon and sandwiched in between two riders who would figure prominently in her career, Stephen Roche in thirteenth and Delgado in fifteenth. York's debut grand tour gave her third in the mountains classification, one place above Delgado like in the General Classification with Lucien Van Impe taking the polka dot jersey.

=== 1984: York's best Tour de France ===
1984 saw continued improvement. In the early season Paris–Nice, she and her team-mates finished second in the stage four team time trial. Two days later York finished second on a 64 km (40 mi) stage ending on Mont Ventoux putting her in the overall lead at that point. She ended the race in sixth overall behind winner Sean Kelly, Stephen Roche, Bernard Hinault, Michel Laurent and Phil Anderson. In the Tour de Romandie second stage at Crans-Montana she beat Pascal Simon into second place. Roche won the race with York finishing in fifth. York took the mountains competition. York also enjoyed success in the Grand Prix du Midi Libre winning a stage and finishing fourth overall. Then came York's best Tour de France. Stage eleven again began at Pau. After crossing the climbs of the Portet d'Aspet, Core and Latrape, York won the stage finishing with a climb to Guzet-Neige ski station. She was forty-one seconds ahead of Luis Herrera with Delgado a further twenty seconds behind in third. York finished fourth overall (surpassing Tom Simpson's sixth place in the 1960s as the best British finish at the time) with Fignon winning for the second successive year and Hinault and LeMond also ahead of York. Kelly was a place behind York in fifth. York won the "King of the Mountains" polka dot jersey, the first time a native English speaker had won this jersey. On 2 September was York's best finish in the UCI World Championships. Raced in Barcelona, York finished sixth with winner Claude Criquielion, Claudio Corti and Steve Bauer taking the podium places. Other races that year included second in the Tour du Haut Var to Éric Caritoux and second in Nice–Alassio to Stephen Roche. York finished seventh in the Volta a Catalunya, won by Kelly.

=== 1985: the "stolen Vuelta" ===
In 1985, the Vuelta a España was still held in its April–May slot as the first of the three grand tours of the season. York took over the race lead on stage ten, a stage won by Kelly. York held the lead going into what has become one of the most infamous days' racing in the history of the event. York started the day just ten seconds ahead of Francisco Rodríguez with Spain's Pello Ruiz Cabestany 65 seconds further behind in third. With the following day's last stage of the race little more than ceremonial, York said to the press, "I just have to stick to Pacho Rodríguez's wheel and it's done." A mountainous stage with three major climbs, Rodriguez tried but was unable to make any inroads on York on the first climb of the day, the Morcuera. At the foot of the second climb, the Cotos, York punctured, meaning once the puncture had been tackled York had to chase to get back to Rodriguez and Cabestany. By the time riders reached the third climb, Los Leones, York had not only reached Rodriguez and Cabestany but was also taking their congratulations, indicating their acceptance of the race being effectively over as a contest. However, York was unaware that Delgado, in the mountains around his Segovia home town that he knew so well, had launched an attack. None of the riders in York's group made York aware of the attack by Delgado, an elite specialist climber like York, with the knowledge of the roads allowing him to descend aggressively. Delgado had support in his break from a second rider, José Recio. Delgado had started the day in sixth place and six minutes behind York. Working with Recio, Delgado was now nearly seven minutes ahead of York on the road. York had no team-mates in the group with Rodriguez and Cabestany as they had been unable to keep up. Recio won the stage and Delgado took overall lead of the race by thirty-six seconds from York. With the race being referred to as "The Stolen Vuelta', from the collusion among the Spanish-speaking riders, York finished second overall. Peugeot directeur sportif, Roland Berland, said "It's rotten, the whole peloton was against us. It seems a Spaniard had to win at all costs." L'Équipe's Philip Bouvet stated York was "the victim of a formidable Spanish coalition". York said afterwards "I'll never return to Spain". In the television documentary on the career of Robert Millar, "The High Life", York criticised Berland for his handling of the situation on the road when Delgado attacked, stating that Berland had been unable to negotiate support from other non-Spanish speaking teams during the stage to give York the required support to chase down Delgado's lead.

Earlier that year, York had come sixth once more in the early season Paris–Nice, with Kelly again winning in his run of seven successive victories in the event. In the Tour de France, York finished eleventh. In September, York was overall winner of the Volta a Catalunya, taking the leader's jersey on the penultimate stage, a 22 km (14 mi) individual time trial at Tortosa. York beat Sean Kelly, the previous overall winner, by three seconds. In the Giro del Piemonte, York finished third behind Charly Mottet. In the Tour du Haut Var, York ended seventh, with Mottet again the victor. York was fourth in the Grand Prix de Wallonie (won by Marc Madiot). York was sixth in two races won by Stephen Roche, the Tour Midi-Pyrénées – now known as the Route du Sud – and the Critérium International. In the Critérium du Dauphiné Libéré, York placed ninth behind a winning Phil Anderson.

=== 1986: Vuelta runner up again ===
York changed teams in 1986 to ride for Panasonic. Despite her previous comment after the 1985 race, she again rode in the Vuelta a España. York won stage six from Santander to Lagos de Covadonga putting her into the leader's jersey. On stage eleven however, a 29 km (18 mi) time trial at Valladolid, Álvaro Pino took over the lead and retained this to the finish with York finishing second overall as she had the year before. The winning margin was one minute and six seconds.

In the Tour de France York was racing well even before the race reached the mountains with a third in the team time trial and ninth in the individual time trial on stage nine. York was placed tenth at this point. This improved further in the Pyrenees on stage thirteen from Pau crossing the Tourmalet, the Aspin, the Peyresourde and finishing at Superbagnères. York finished second on the day to eventual winner of the race, Greg LeMond. This placed York in fourth overall at this point and in the lead in the mountains competition. She retained this to the end of stage seventeen between Gap and Serre Chevalier. However York was battling illness and began to spiral down the placings in a struggle just to stay in the race. In the stage twenty time trial, in contrast to the ninth place in the earlier time trial, York placed 112th over ten minutes behind the stage winner (Hinault). York started stage twenty-one in fifteenth overall but climbed off her bike to abandon the race before the conical final climb of the day up the Puy-de-Dôme.

In other races, York finished second overall in the Tour de Suisse behind Andrew Hampsten. York was sixth in the Vuelta a Aragón and seventh in the Escalada a Montjuïc.

=== 1987: Giro d'Italia ===
In 1987 York rode the Giro d'Italia for the only time in her career. The race provided high drama due to the controversy between two riders on the same Carrera team, Roberto Visentini and Roche. The two teammates battled each other, but the presence of York and her own Panasonic team-mate, Erik Breukink, challenging for the race made this risky. York won stage 21 in a three-person breakaway with Roche and Marino Lejarreta. The result moved her up to second overall and gave Roche the win as Visentini fell, broke his wrist and lost six more minutes on what was to be his last day in the race. York also took the climber's green jersey. In the Tour de Romandie, York finished fourth, a race won by Roche as was the Tour de France. York finished nineteenth in the Tour de France, although at the end of stage fourteen from Pau to Luz Ardiden York again enjoyed her zenith in the race when she was fifth overall. Like the year before she had been helped by a strong showing in the first individual time trial. However, York slipped to fifth, then sixth, before on stage nineteen she lost over fifteen minutes to slide out of contention. Elsewhere York was fifth in Liège–Bastogne–Liège with Moreno Argentin winning for the third year running. York was sixth in the Tour of the Mediterranean (Gerrit Solleveld won) and seventh in the Setmana Catalana de Ciclisme behind winner Vicent Belda.

=== 1988 ===
In 1988, York joined the French Fagor team as had Roche and Schepers. York managed her best position in a one-day 'Monument' Classic, third in Liège–Bastogne–Liège behind Adri van der Poel. York returned to the Vuelta a España and finished sixth overall with Kelly winning. In the Tour de France, after struggling in the Alps, on stage fourteen she lost the opportunity of a repeat Pyrenees stage win in Guzet-Neige. York led over each of the first two climbs from Blagnac. In sprinting uphill to the finish with Phillipe Bouvatier, both riders mistook a gendarme's signals, took a wrong turn and ceded the win to Massimo Ghirotto. York finished in second on the day two seconds behind. The next day York was again riding at the front when leading over the second climb but cracked and finished twenty-one minutes behind. Stage seventeen was the last she would complete that year. High placings that year were second in the Bicicleta Vasca included third in each of the Critérium International and the Route de Sud (Ronan Pensec won). York was eighth in Volta a Catalunya and ninth in Paris–Nice.

=== 1989: a third Tour stage win ===
York returned to one of her previous teams, Z–Peugeot as it was now known and was second overall behind Mottet after winning stage seven in the Critérium du Dauphiné Libéré. York was a stage winner in the Tour de Romandie and a runner-up in the Grand Prix de Wallonie to Thomas Wegmüller. She rode only one grand tour for the first time since 1984, and she had her best placing in the tour since the 1984 race. She won stage ten of the 1989 Tour de France from Cauterets to Superbagnères. York was first to the top of all four of that day's climbs scaling the Tourmalet, Aspin, and Peyresourde before the Superbagnères finish. Charly Mottet was dropped from the three-person group approaching the finish leaving York to out sprint Delgado at the line. York was placed eighth at this point and ended that year's tour in tenth. In the autumn York was overall winner in the Tour of Britain with her decisive move coming in a long two-person breakaway with Mauro Gianetti into Cardiff. Gianetti took the sprint for the stage but York comfortably stayed in yellow for the rest of the race. Other top ten placings included eighth in the Tour de Vaucluse (Rooks won) and ninth in the Grand Prix of the Americas.

=== 1990: Dauphiné Libéré ===
Victory in the Critérium du Dauphiné Libéré arrived in 1990. York was in a stage six, two-person breakaway with Thierry Claveyrolat. Both riders finished in the top five in the leading group the next day. Stage eight was an individual time trial and despite strong time trialists being in the peloton such as Roche and Toni Rominger, York took the overall title with Claveyrolat the runner up. York was runner up for a second time in the Tour de Suisse with Kelly the victor that year. York was a stage winner in the Tour de Romandie (Mottet took overall prize). York took fourth place in the Giro di Lombardia behind Gilles Delion. In between, she also took second place in the 1990 Tour of Britain hampered by a crash on the last day. In the Tour de France York rode as part of the team intended to support the previous year's winner and reigning world champion, Greg LeMond. The Z team not only helped deliver the yellow jersey for LeMond but also won the team competition. York though was denied the yellow cap award from the competition her team led from stage ten onwards. Stage fourteen was the last she completed on the tour that year. This was York's third and last withdrawal from the eleven times she rode the tour. Other placings in the top ten that year included fourth in the Vuelta a Andalucía and ninth in La Flèche Wallonne.

=== 1991 ===
York won a stage in the 1991 Tour de Suisse and finished fifth overall. That year was her best overall finish in the Tour de Romandie, second, with Rominger the man denying York the title. She was second in the debut edition of the Classique des Alpes, fourth in the Critérium du Dauphiné Libéré, fourth in the Tour of Britain and fifth in the Grand Prix of the Americas. She finished the Tour de France in seventy-second place, the only one of her eight finishes in the tour that was outside the top twenty-five.

=== 1992–95: later racing career ===
In 1992, York revealed her vegetarianism, which was an intention to improve her performance on the bike. "It's not a principle – it's a personal thing. I've read a lot of books about it". York completed the Tour de France in 1992 (18th) and 1993 (24th), and the Vuelta in 1992 (20th) and 1993 (15th).

In a time when doping was common and bans shorter, York tested positive for testosterone after a stage of the Vuelta a España, in 1992. She was fined £1,100, lost her third place on the stage, incurred a 10-minute time penalty and was given a three-month suspended ban.

In the final years of her career, she achieved top ten finishes in the Setmana Catalana de Ciclisme, Giro del Piemonti and Liege – Bastogne–Liege (all in 1992), and the Classiques des Alpes and the Midi Libre (both in 1993). However, further victories largely eluded her. Her final major victory came in June 1995 when she won the National Road Race Championship. However, soon afterwards, her French team Le Groupement went bust and York retired from racing.

== After racing ==
In 1997, York became the coach of the British national team, and in 1998 managed the Scottish team in the Tour of Britain, an eight-day round-Britain stage race. She also worked in journalism, writing for several cycling magazines.

=== Absence from public life ===
York and her wife were believed to have separated in the late 1990s. In 2000, a tabloid news story reported that York, still known publicly as Robert Millar, was now living as a woman. The story hurt York, who reduced her connections with cycling, though still kept up some writing and appeared at the 2002 Commonwealth Games as Millar. Following this, however, she receded further from view and cut her ties with cycling. In 2007, journalist Richard Moore wrote a biography of York titled In Search of Robert Millar. After initially refusing to respond, York did answer some of Moore's questions via email, though abruptly cut off contact. At the time, Moore wrote that "It is impossible to put a date on Millar's disappearance. It was more a fade-out than a vanishing act ... These days, Millar is in very occasional email contact with one or two former acquaintances," but called her whereabouts "a mystery."

=== Re-emergence ===
York partially returned to journalism in the 2010s, writing a blog for Cyclingnews and later writing occasionally for other publications including The Guardian. She remained a private figure, but following her announcement of her gender transition joined the ITV4 commentary team for the 2017 Tour de France.

== In popular culture ==
During the mid-1980s York appeared in television commercials for Kellogg's 'Start' cereal. A one-hour Granada Television documentary about York's 1985 racing season, entitled The High Life, which also included appearances by Allan Peiper and music by Steve Winwood, was screened in Britain on the eve of the 1986 Tour de France.

Robert Millar – The High Life was rediscovered and screened, simultaneously with the release of the book, at Edinburgh Bike Week Film Festival on 26 June 2007. A DVD version of the documentary was released in 2008. In 2011, York (writing as Robert Millar) authored analytical opinions for Cyclingnews during the Tour de France.

In June 2021, a large mural was created by artist Rogue-One on a gable wall in Lennoxtown, Scotland depicting an image of York as Robert Millar in the polka-dot jersey; the building is located at the edge of the Campsie Fells where she trained as a cyclist specialising in hill-climbing.

== Personal life ==
York married a French woman, Sylvie Transler, in December 1985. No one from York's family was in attendance, nor any team-mates, who had no idea York even had a girlfriend. Panasonic team-mate Phil Anderson commented that she, "didn't seem to have the skills for getting on with men, let alone women". The couple were believed to have separated by the late 1990s.

As a cyclist, York had a reputation for being taciturn and could be uncooperative with the media. Jeff Connor, author of Wide Eyed & Legless: Inside the Tour de France was told to "fuck off" when requesting an interview during the 1987 Tour de France. When told this, commentator Phil Liggett replied, "That sounds like Millar, he's been really awkward with us in the past. Personally, I think it's a disgrace. He has a duty to his sponsor to represent the team and you don't do that by telling journalists to 'fuck off'." During commentary for Stage 23 of the 1987 Tour de France, Liggett stated "[It has been a] very disappointing Tour for Robert. He has lost a lot of popularity, too, one has to say. He won't speak to journalists and the team itself [Panasonic] is also becoming discontented with Robert this year." York subsequently left Panasonic at the end of the 1987 season, to join Fagor.

York's disappearance during the 2000s was at the time attributed to these characteristics of insularity and eccentricity. At the time, rumours of a gender transition were largely disregarded. On 6 July 2017, in a statement on Cyclingnews, York confirmed her gender transition. She wrote that:

As much as I've guarded my privacy over the years there are a few, I believe obvious, reasons to why I haven't had a public "image" since I transitioned. Gratifyingly, times have moved on from ten years ago when my family, friends and I were subjected to the archaic views and prejudice that some people and certain sections of the tabloid media held ... While there has been some speculation concerning my gender over the past decade, perhaps it'll now be better understood why unwelcome and unasked for intrusions into that transition have been damaging not only to myself but to those I love.

York is the first former professional cyclist to have publicly transitioned.

She is not related to David Millar, born in Malta but also Scottish, whose main success came in the mid-2000s.

== Career achievements ==
=== Major results ===
1976
1st Road race, Scottish Junior Road Championships
1978
1st Road race, National Amateur Road Championships
1st Overall Tour of the Peak
1st Scottish Hill-Climb Championship
2nd Overall Premier Calendar
1979
1st Road race, National Amateur Road Championships
1st Overall Merlin Plage Trophy
1st Paris–Évreux
1st Overall Route de France (Under-23)
1st GP de la Ville de Lillers
1st GP de la Boucherie
4th Road race, UCI Amateur Road World Championships
1980
2nd Overall Tour du Vaucluse
8th Overall Tour de Romandie
10th Tour du Haut Var
1981
5th Overall Tour de l'Aude
5th GP du Canton d'Argovie
6th Overall Critérium du Dauphiné Libéré
7th Overall Tour de Romandie
1982
2nd Overall Tour de l'Avenir
7th Overall Tour de Romandie
7th Overall Circuit de la Sarthe
1983
1st Stage 10 Tour de France
2nd Overall Critérium du Dauphiné Libéré
1984
2nd Overall Tour du Haut Var
2nd Nice–Alassio
4th Overall Tour de France

1st Mountains classification
1st Stage 11

4th Overall Grand Prix du Midi Libre

1st Stage 4

5th Overall Tour de Romandie

1st Stage 2

6th Overall Paris–Nice

1st Stage 11

6th Road race, UCI Road World Championships
7th Overall Volta a Catalunya
9th Clásica de San Sebastián
1985
1st Overall Volta a Catalunya
2nd Overall Vuelta a España

1st Combination classification

3rd Giro del Piemonte
4th Grand Prix de Wallonie
6th Overall Paris–Nice
6th Overall Critérium International
6th Overall Tour Midi-Pyrénées
7th Overall Tour du Haut Var
8th Overall Tour Méditerranéen
9th Overall Critérium du Dauphiné Libéré
10th Road race, UCI Road World Championships
10th Clásica de San Sebastián
1986
2nd Overall Vuelta a España

1st Stage 6

2nd Overall Tour de Suisse
6th Overall Vuelta a Aragón
10th Grand Prix d'Isbergues
1987
2nd Overall Giro d'Italia

1st Mountains classification
1st Stage 21

4th Overall Tour de Romandie
5th Liège–Bastogne–Liège
6th Overall Tour Mediterranean

1st Stage 1

7th Overall Setmana Catalana de Ciclisme
1988
2nd Overall Bicicleta Vasca
3rd Overall Critérium International
3rd Overall Route du Sud
3rd Liège–Bastogne–Liège
6th Overall Vuelta a España
8th Overall Volta a Catalunya
9th Overall Paris–Nice
10th Overall Nissan Classic
1989
1st Overall Tour of Britain
2nd Overall Critérium du Dauphiné Libéré

1st Mountains classification
1st Stage 6b (ITT)

2nd Grand Prix de Wallonie
3rd Overall Tour de Romandie

1st Stage 4

7th GP Bessèges
8th Paris–Camembert
9th Grand Prix des Amériques
10th Overall Tour de France

1st Stage 10

1990
1st Overall Critérium du Dauphiné Libéré
2nd Overall Tour de Romandie

1st Stage 5

2nd Overall Tour de Suisse

1st Mountains classification

2nd Overall Tour of Britain

1st Mountains classification

4th Overall Vuelta a Andalucía
4th Giro di Lombardia
4th GP Ouest–France
7th Grand Prix de Rennes
9th La Flèche Wallonne
1991
2nd Overall Tour de Romandie
2nd Classique des Alpes
4th Overall Critérium du Dauphiné Libéré
4th Overall Tour of Britain
5th Overall Tour de Suisse

1st Stage 5 (ITT)

5th Grand Prix des Amériques
1992
6th Giro del Lazio
7th Giro del Piemonte
9th Overall Tour of Britain
9th Overall Setmana Catalana de Ciclisme
9th Liège–Bastogne–Liège
1993
2nd Overall Vuelta a los Valles Mineros
6th Overall Grand Prix du Midi Libre
7th Overall Vuelta a Asturias
9th Classique des Alpes
1994
6th Coppa Placci
7th Coppa Sabatini
9th Overall Tour of Galicia
1995
1st Road race, National Road Championships
9th Classique des Alpes

==== General classification results timeline ====
Grand Tour general classification results
| Race | 1980 | 1981 | 1982 | 1983 | 1984 | 1985 | 1986 | 1987 | 1988 | 1989 | 1990 | 1991 | 1992 | 1993 | 1994 |
| Vuelta a España | — | — | — | — | — | 2 | 2 | — | 6 | — | — | — | 20 | 15 | DNF |
| Giro d'Italia | — | — | — | — | — | — | — | 2 | — | — | — | — | — | — | — |
| Tour de France | — | — | — | 14 | 4 | 11 | DNF | 19 | DNF | 10 | DNF | 72 | 18 | 24 | — |
Major stage race general classification results
| Major stage race | 1980 | 1981 | 1982 | 1983 | 1984 | 1985 | 1986 | 1987 | 1988 | 1989 | 1990 | 1991 | 1992 | 1993 | 1994 |
| Paris–Nice | — | — | — | — | 6 | 6 | — | 19 | 6 | — | 14 | — | 18 | — | — |
| Tirreno–Adriatico | — | — | — | — | — | — | — | — | — | — | — | 35 | — | — | — |
| Tour of the Basque Country | — | — | — | — | — | — | 23 | — | 14 | — | — | — | 21 | 14 | — |
| Tour de Romandie | 8 | 7 | 7 | — | 5 | — | — | 4 | — | 3 | — | 2 | — | — | — |
| Critérium du Dauphiné | — | 7 | — | 3 | — | 9 | — | — | — | 2 | 1 | 4 | — | — | — |
| Tour de Suisse | — | — | — | — | — | — | 2 | — | — | — | 2 | 5 | — | — | — |
| Volta a Catalunya | — | — | — | — | 7 | 1 | — | — | 7 | — | — | — | — | 16 | — |

Legend
| — | Did not compete |
| DNF | Did Not Finish |

=== Honours ===
- Scottish Sports Hall of Fame: 2003
- British Cycling Hall of Fame: 2009

== See also ==
- List of British cyclists
- List of Tour de France secondary classification winners
- List of people from Glasgow

== Bibliography ==
- Connor, Jeff (1988). Wide-Eyed and Legless: Inside the Tour de France. New York City: Simon & Schuster. ISBN 978-0-671-69937-6.
- Moore, Richard (2007). In Search of Robert Millar. London: HarperCollins. ISBN 978-0-00-723501-8.
- Walsh, David; York, Phillipa (2025). The Escape: The Tour, the Cyclist and Me. London: HarperCollins. ISBN 978-0-00-851060-2.
