= 1983 Critérium du Dauphiné Libéré =

Race details
- Dates: 30 May – 6 June 1983
- Stages: 7 + Prologue
- Distance: 1,261.5 km (783.9 mi)
- Winning time: 34h 12' 00"

Results
Jersey awarded to the overall winner	Winner	Greg LeMond (USA)	(Renault–Elf)
	Second	Robert Millar (GBR)	(Peugeot–Shell–Michelin)
	Third	Robert Alban (FRA)	(La Redoute–Motobécane)
Jersey awarded to the points classification winner	Points	Phil Anderson (AUS)	(Peugeot–Shell–Michelin)
Jersey awarded to the mountains classification winner	Mountains	Pascal Simon (FRA)	(Peugeot–Shell–Michelin)

The 1983 Critérium du Dauphiné Libéré was the 35th edition of the cycle race and was held from 30 May to 6 June 1983. The race started in Sallanches and finished in Pierrelatte. The race was won by Greg LeMond of the Renault-Elf team. Pascal Simon, the initial winner, tested positive for Micorene and was given a time penalty, which resulted in his demotion to fourth place.

== Teams ==
Eleven teams, containing a total of 99 riders, participated in the race:

- COOP–Mercier–Mavic
- Renault–Elf
- Peugeot–Shell–Michelin
- La Redoute–Motobécane
- Sem–Reydel–Mavic
- Saint-Etienne–Pélussin
- TI–Raleigh–Campagnolo
- Cilo–Aufina
- Teka
- Splendor–Euro Shop
- Poland amateur team

== Route ==
Stage characteristics and winners
Stage	Date	Course	Distance	Type	Stage winner
P	30 May 1983	Sallanches	4.5 km (2.8 mi)	Individual time trial	Phil Anderson (AUS)
1	31 May 1983	Sallanches to Oyonnax	186 km (116 mi)		Greg LeMond (USA)
2a	1 June 1983	Oyonnax to Bourg-en-Bresse	54 km (34 mi)		Patrick Clerc (FRA)
2b	1 June 1983	Bourg-en-Bresse to Le Creusot	75 km (47 mi)		Éric Dall'Armelina (FRA)
3	2 June 1983	Le Creusot to Firminy	228 km (142 mi)		Phil Anderson (AUS)
4	3 June 1983	Voreppe to Lyon	155 km (96 mi)		Christian Jourdan (FRA)
5	4 June 1983	Voreppe to Briançon	243 km (151 mi)		Greg LeMond (USA)
6	5 June 1983	Gap to Gap	190 km (120 mi)		Pascal Simon (FRA)
7a	6 June 1983	Carpentras to Montélimar	93 km (58 mi)		Gilbert Glaus (SUI)
7b	6 June 1983	Montélimar to Pierrelatte	33 km (21 mi)	Individual time trial	Greg LeMond (USA)

== Stages ==
=== Prologue ===
30 May 1983 — Sallanches, 4.5 km (2.8 mi) (ITT)

Prologue result

Rank	Rider	Team	Time
1	Phil Anderson (AUS)	Peugeot–Shell–Michelin	6' 05"
2	Éric Salomon (FRA)	Renault–Elf	+ 3"
3	Pascal Simon (FRA)	Peugeot–Shell–Michelin	s.t.
4	Joop Zoetemelk (NED)	COOP–Mercier–Mavic	+ 4"
5	Greg LeMond (USA)	Renault–Elf	+ 6"
6	Régis Clère (FRA)	COOP–Mercier–Mavic	s.t.
7	Michel Laurent (FRA)	COOP–Mercier–Mavic	s.t.
8	Jean-Marie Grezet (SUI)	Sem–Reydel–Mavic	s.t.
9	Bernard Vallet (FRA)	La Redoute–Motobécane	s.t.
10	Jacques Michaud (FRA)	COOP–Mercier–Mavic	s.t.

=== Stage 1 ===
31 May 1983 — Sallanches to Oyonnax, 186 km (115.6 mi)

Stage 1 result

Rank	Rider	Team	Time
1	Greg LeMond (USA)	Renault–Elf	5h 00' 43"
2	Sean Kelly (IRL)	Sem–Reydel–Mavic	+ 17"
3	Phil Anderson (AUS)	Peugeot–Shell–Michelin	s.t.

General classification after Stage 1

Rank	Rider	Team	Time
1	Greg LeMond (USA)	Renault–Elf	

=== Stage 2a ===
1 June 1983 — Oyonnax to Bourg-en-Bresse, 54 km (33.6 mi)

Stage 2a result

Rank	Rider	Team	Time
1	Patrick Clerc (FRA)	Sem–Reydel–Mavic	1h 13' 39"
2	Johan van der Velde (NED)	TI–Raleigh–Campagnolo	s.t.
3	Marc Madiot (FRA)	Renault–Elf	s.t.

General classification after Stage 2a

Rank	Rider	Team	Time
1	Jacques Michaud (FRA)	COOP–Mercier–Mavic	

=== Stage 2b ===
1 June 1983 — Bourg-en-Bresse to Le Creusot, 75 km (46.6 mi)

Stage 2b result

Rank	Rider	Team	Time
1	Éric Dall'Armelina (FRA)	Sem–Reydel–Mavic	1h 45' 01"
2	Benny Van Brabant (BEL)	Splendor–Euro Shop	+ 1' 35"
3	Phil Anderson (AUS)	Peugeot–Shell–Michelin	s.t.

General classification after Stage 2b

Rank	Rider	Team	Time
1	Jacques Michaud (FRA)	COOP–Mercier–Mavic	8h 27' 57"
2	Pascal Simon (FRA)	Peugeot–Shell–Michelin	+ 6"
3	Jean-Marie Grezet (SUI)	Sem–Reydel–Mavic	+ 10"

=== Stage 3 ===
2 June 1983 — Le Creusot to Firminy, 228 km (141.7 mi)

Stage 3 result

Rank	Rider	Team	Time
1	Phil Anderson (AUS)	Peugeot–Shell–Michelin	5h 40' 20"
2	Benny Van Brabant (BEL)	Splendor–Euro Shop	s.t.
3	Leo van Vliet (NED)	TI–Raleigh–Campagnolo	s.t.

General classification after Stage 3

Rank	Rider	Team	Time
1	Jacques Michaud (FRA)	COOP–Mercier–Mavic	14h 08' 18"
2	Pascal Simon (FRA)	Peugeot–Shell–Michelin	+ 9"
3	Johan van der Velde (NED)	TI–Raleigh–Campagnolo	s.t.

=== Stage 4 ===
3 June 1983 — Voreppe to Lyon, 155 km (96.3 mi)

Stage 4 result

Rank	Rider	Team	Time
1	Christian Jourdan (FRA)	La Redoute–Motobécane	4h 38' 57"
2	Jacques Hanegraaf (NED)	TI–Raleigh–Campagnolo	+ 16"
3	Johan van der Velde (NED)	TI–Raleigh–Campagnolo	+ 19"

General classification after Stage 4

Rank	Rider	Team	Time
1	Jacques Michaud (FRA)	COOP–Mercier–Mavic	18h 47' 34"
2	Johan van der Velde (NED)	TI–Raleigh–Campagnolo	+ 3"
3	Pascal Simon (FRA)	Peugeot–Shell–Michelin	+ 8"

=== Stage 5 ===
4 June 1983 — Voreppe to Briançon, 243 km (151.0 mi)

Stage 5 result

Rank	Rider	Team	Time
1	Greg LeMond (USA)	Renault–Elf	7h 03' 15"
2	Pascal Simon (FRA)	Peugeot–Shell–Michelin	s.t.
3	Robert Alban (FRA)	La Redoute–Motobécane	s.t.

General classification after Stage 5

Rank	Rider	Team	Time
1	Greg LeMond (USA)	Renault–Elf	25h 50' 45"
2	Pascal Simon (FRA)	Peugeot–Shell–Michelin	+ 2"
3	Éric Salomon (FRA)	Renault–Elf	+ 49"

=== Stage 6 ===
5 June 1983 — Gap to Gap, 190 km (118.1 mi)

Stage 6 result

Rank	Rider	Team	Time
1	Pascal Simon (FRA)	Peugeot–Shell–Michelin	5h 31' 21"
2	Thierry Claveyrolat (FRA)	Saint-Étienne–Pélussin	+ 2' 59"
3	Robert Millar (GBR)	Peugeot–Shell–Michelin	+ 3' 00"

General classification after Stage 6

Rank	Rider	Team	Time
1	Pascal Simon (FRA)	Peugeot–Shell–Michelin	31h 21' 53"
2	Greg LeMond (USA)	Renault–Elf	+ 3' 14"
3	Robert Millar (GBR)	Peugeot–Shell–Michelin	+ 4' 12"

=== Stage 7a ===
6 June 1983 — Carpentras to Montélimar, 93 km (57.8 mi)

Stage 7a result

Rank	Rider	Team	Time
1	Gilbert Glaus (SUI)	Cilo–Aufina	1h 59' 43"
2	Phil Anderson (AUS)	Peugeot–Shell–Michelin	s.t.
3	Johan van der Velde (NED)	TI–Raleigh–Campagnolo	s.t.

General classification after Stage 7a

Rank	Rider	Team	Time
1	Pascal Simon (FRA)	Peugeot–Shell–Michelin	

=== Stage 7b ===
6 June 1983 — Montélimar to Pierrelatte, 33 km (20.5 mi) (ITT)

Pascal Simon, the original winner of the race, was declassified to fourth place for doping.

Stage 7b result

Rank	Rider	Team	Time
1	Greg LeMond (USA)	Renault–Elf	47' 03"
2	Bernard Vallet (FRA)	La Redoute–Motobécane	+ 14"
3	Phil Anderson (AUS)	Peugeot–Shell–Michelin	+ 16"

General classification after Stage 7b

Rank	Rider	Team	Time
1	Greg LeMond (USA)	Renault–Elf	34h 12' 00"
2	Robert Millar (GBR)	Peugeot–Shell–Michelin	+ 2' 53"
3	Robert Alban (FRA)	La Redoute–Motobécane	+ 6' 12"

== General classification ==
Final general classification

Rank	Rider	Team	Time
1	Greg LeMond (USA)	Renault–Elf	34h 12' 00"
2	Robert Millar (GBR)	Peugeot–Shell–Michelin	+ 2' 53"
3	Robert Alban (FRA)	La Redoute–Motobécane	+ 6' 12"
4	Pascal Simon (FRA)	Peugeot–Shell–Michelin	+ 7' 48" (Note: Pascal Simon, the original winner, was declassified for doping.)
5	Éric Salomon (FRA)	Renault–Elf	+ 8' 23"
6	Phil Anderson (AUS)	Peugeot–Shell–Michelin	+ 10' 14"
7	Gerard Veldscholten (NED)	TI–Raleigh–Campagnolo	+ 11' 59"
8	Laurent Biondi (FRA)	La Redoute–Motobécane	+ 13' 49"
9	Gilles Mas (FRA)	Saint-Etienne–Pélussin	+ 15' 54"
10	Alain Vigneron (FRA)	Renault–Elf	+ 16' 39"
