= List of Tour de France secondary classification winners =

The Tour de France is a road cycling stage race held since 1903 over a current period of three weeks, although it was not staged from 1915 to 1918 and from 1940 to 1946, because of the First World War and Second World War respectively.

The winner of the Tour de France is determined by the general classification. In addition, there are some secondary classifications. The mountains classification, first calculated in 1933 and first associated with the polkadot jersey in 1975; To celebrate the 50th anniversary of the race in 1953, the points classification was reintroduced, having previously been the main classification from 1905 to 1912 inclusive. It rewarded the consistent finishers in individual stages by awarding points depending on the placing at the end of the stage and, from 1966 onwards, at any designated intermediate points along the route. From 1966 to 1989 inclusive, a separate classification was included solely for points awarded at these intermediate 'hot spots' or 'sprints' and from 1984 onward associated with the award of a red jersey. In 1975, the Tour organisers launched the young rider classification, replacing the 'combination' classification run since 1968 for 'overall best rider' based on points awarded from the general, mountain and points classification- although the combination classification was subsequently reintroduced from 1980 to 1989 inclusive. Eddy Merckx in 1969 is the only rider to win the King of the Mountains, the points and the overall title in the same year; had the combination or youth classification jerseys existed at the time, he would have won those too..

== By year ==
| Tour | Year | | Points | | Mountains | | Youth | Notes |
|---|---|---|---|---|---|---|---|---|
| 27 | 1933 | | | (Spain) | Vicente Trueba | | | |
| 28 | 1934 | | | (France) | René Vietto | | | |
| 29 | 1935 | | | (Belgium) | Félicien Vervaecke | | | |
| 30 | 1936 | | | (Spain) | Julián Berrendero | | | |
| 31 | 1937 | | | (Belgium) | Félicien Vervaecke (2) | | | |
| 32 | 1938 | | | (Italy) | Gino Bartali | | | |
| 33 | 1939 | | | (Belgium) | Sylvère Maes | | | |
| 34 | 1947 | | | (Italy) | Pierre Brambilla | | | |
| 35 | 1948 | | | (Italy) | Gino Bartali (2) | | | |
| 36 | 1949 | | | (Italy) | Fausto Coppi | | | |
| 37 | 1950 | | | (France) | Louison Bobet | | | |
| 38 | 1951 | | | (France) | Raphaël Géminiani | | | |
| 39 | 1952 | | | (Italy) | Fausto Coppi (2) | | | |
| 40 | 1953 | (Switzerland) | Fritz Schär | (Spain) | Jesús Loroño | | | |
| 41 | 1954 | (Switzerland) | Ferdinand Kübler | (Spain) | Federico Bahamontes | | | |
| 42 | 1955 | (Belgium) | Stan Ockers | (Luxembourg) | Charly Gaul | | | |
| 43 | 1956 | (Belgium) | Stan Ockers (2) | (Luxembourg) | Charly Gaul (2) | | | |
| 44 | 1957 | (France) | Jean Forestier | (Italy) | Gastone Nencini | | | |
| 45 | 1958 | (France) | Jean Graczyk | (Spain) | Federico Bahamontes (2) | | | |
| 46 | 1959 | (France) | André Darrigade | (Spain) | Federico Bahamontes (3) | | | |
| 47 | 1960 | (France) | Jean Graczyk (2) | (Italy) | Imerio Massignan | | | |
| 48 | 1961 | (France) | André Darrigade (2) | (Italy) | Imerio Massignan (2) | | | |
| 49 | 1962 | (West Germany) | Rudi Altig | (Spain) | Federico Bahamontes (4) | | | |
| 50 | 1963 | (Belgium) | Rik Van Looy | (Spain) | Federico Bahamontes (5) | | | |
| 51 | 1964 | (Netherlands) | Jan Janssen | (Spain) | Federico Bahamontes (6) | | | |
| 52 | 1965 | (Netherlands) | Jan Janssen (2) | (Spain) | Julio Jiménez | | | |
| 53 | 1966 | (Belgium) | Willy Planckaert | (Spain) | Julio Jiménez (2) | | | |
| 54 | 1967 | (Netherlands) | Jan Janssen (3) | (Spain) | Julio Jiménez (3) | | | |
| 55 | 1968 | (Italy) | Franco Bitossi | (Spain) | Aurelio González Puente | | | |
| 56 | 1969 | (Belgium) | Eddy Merckx | (Belgium) | Eddy Merckx | | | |
| 57 | 1970 | (Belgium) | Walter Godefroot | (Belgium) | Eddy Merckx (2) | | | |
| 58 | 1971 | (Belgium) | Eddy Merckx (2) | (Belgium) | Lucien Van Impe | | | |
| 59 | 1972 | (Belgium) | Eddy Merckx (3) | (Belgium) | Lucien Van Impe (2) | | | |
| 60 | 1973 | (Belgium) | Herman Van Springel | (Spain) | Pedro Torres | | | |
| 61 | 1974 | (Belgium) | Patrick Sercu | (Spain) | Domingo Perurena | | | |
| 62 | 1975 | (Belgium) | Rik Van Linden | (Belgium) | Lucien Van Impe (3) | (Italy) | Francesco Moser | |
| 63 | 1976 | (Belgium) | Freddy Maertens | (Italy) | Giancarlo Bellini | (Spain) | Enrique Martínez Heredia | |
| 64 | 1977 | (France) | Jacques Esclassan | (Belgium) | Lucien Van Impe (4) | (West Germany) | Dietrich Thurau | |
| 65 | 1978 | (Belgium) | Freddy Maertens (2) | (France) | Mariano Martínez | (Netherlands) | Henk Lubberding | |
| 66 | 1979 | (France) | Bernard Hinault | (Italy) | Giovanni Battaglin | (France) | Jean-René Bernaudeau | |
| 67 | 1980 | (Belgium) | Rudy Pevenage | (France) | Raymond Martin | (Netherlands) | Johan van der Velde | |
| 68 | 1981 | (Belgium) | Freddy Maertens (3) | (Belgium) | Lucien Van Impe (5) | (Netherlands) | Peter Winnen | |
| 69 | 1982 | (Republic of Ireland) | Sean Kelly | (France) | Bernard Vallet | (Australia) | Phil Anderson | |
| 70 | 1983 | (Republic of Ireland) | Sean Kelly (2) | (Belgium) | Lucien Van Impe (6) | (France) | Laurent Fignon | |
| 71 | 1984 | (Belgium) | Frank Hoste | (United Kingdom) | Robert Millar | (United States) | Greg LeMond | |
| 72 | 1985 | (Republic of Ireland) | Sean Kelly (3) | (Colombia) | Luis Herrera | (Colombia) | Fabio Parra | |
| 73 | 1986 | (Belgium) | Eric Vanderaerden | (France) | Bernard Hinault | (United States) | Andrew Hampsten | |
| 74 | 1987 | (Netherlands) | Jean-Paul van Poppel | (Colombia) | Luis Herrera (2) | (Mexico) | Raúl Alcalá | |
| 75 | 1988 | (Belgium) | Eddy Planckaert | (Netherlands) | Steven Rooks | (Netherlands) | Erik Breukink | |
| 76 | 1989 | (Republic of Ireland) | Sean Kelly (4) | (Netherlands) | Gert-Jan Theunisse | (France) | Fabrice Philipot | |
| 77 | 1990 | (East Germany) | Olaf Ludwig | (France) | Thierry Claveyrolat | (France) | Gilles Delion | |
| 78 | 1991 | (Soviet Union) | Djamolidine Abdoujaparov | (Italy) | Claudio Chiappucci | (Colombia) | Álvaro Mejía Castrillón | |
| 79 | 1992 | (France) | Laurent Jalabert | (Italy) | Claudio Chiappucci (2) | (Netherlands) | Eddy Bouwmans | |
| 80 | 1993 | (Uzbekistan) | Djamolidine Abdoujaparov (2) | (Switzerland) | Tony Rominger | (Spain) | Antonio Martín | |
| 81 | 1994 | (Uzbekistan) | Djamolidine Abdoujaparov (3) | (France) | Richard Virenque | (Italy) | Marco Pantani | |
| 82 | 1995 | (France) | Laurent Jalabert (2) | (France) | Richard Virenque (2) | (Italy) | Marco Pantani (2) | |
| 83 | 1996 | (Germany) | Erik Zabel | (France) | Richard Virenque (3) | (Germany) | Jan Ullrich | |
| 84 | 1997 | (Germany) | Erik Zabel (2) | (France) | Richard Virenque (4) | (Germany) | Jan Ullrich (2) | |
| 85 | 1998 | (Germany) | Erik Zabel (3) | (France) | Christophe Rinero | (Germany) | Jan Ullrich (3) | |
| 86 | 1999 | (Germany) | Erik Zabel (4) | (France) | Richard Virenque (5) | (France) | Benoît Salmon | |
| 87 | 2000 | (Germany) | Erik Zabel (5) | (Colombia) | Santiago Botero | (Spain) | Francisco Mancebo | |
| 88 | 2001 | (Germany) | Erik Zabel (6) | (France) | Laurent Jalabert | (Spain) | Óscar Sevilla | |
| 89 | 2002 | (Australia) | Robbie McEwen | (France) | Laurent Jalabert (2) | (Italy) | Ivan Basso | |
| 90 | 2003 | (Australia) | Baden Cooke | (France) | Richard Virenque (6) | (Russia) | Denis Menchov | |
| 91 | 2004 | (Australia) | Robbie McEwen (2) | (France) | Richard Virenque (7) | (Russia) | Vladimir Karpets | |
| 92 | 2005 | (Norway) | Thor Hushovd | (Denmark) | Michael Rasmussen | (Ukraine) | Yaroslav Popovych | |
| 93 | 2006 | (Australia) | Robbie McEwen (3) | (Denmark) | Michael Rasmussen (2) | (Italy) | Damiano Cunego | |
| 94 | 2007 | (Belgium) | Tom Boonen | (Colombia) | Mauricio Soler | (Spain) | Alberto Contador | |
| 95 | 2008 | (Spain) | Óscar Freire | (Spain) | Carlos Sastre | (Luxembourg) | Andy Schleck | |
| 96 | 2009 | (Norway) | Thor Hushovd (2) | (Spain) | Egoi Martínez | (Luxembourg) | Andy Schleck (2) | |
| 97 | 2010 | (Italy) | Alessandro Petacchi | (France) | Anthony Charteau | (Luxembourg) | Andy Schleck (3) | |
| 98 | 2011 | (United Kingdom) | Mark Cavendish | (Spain) | Samuel Sánchez | (France) | Pierre Rolland | |
| 99 | 2012 | (Slovakia) | Peter Sagan | (France) | Thomas Voeckler | (United States) | Tejay van Garderen | |
| 100 | 2013 | (Slovakia) | Peter Sagan (2) | (Colombia) | Nairo Quintana | (Colombia) | Nairo Quintana | |
| 101 | 2014 | (Slovakia) | Peter Sagan (3) | (Poland) | Rafał Majka | (France) | Thibaut Pinot | |
| 102 | 2015 | (Slovakia) | Peter Sagan (4) | (United Kingdom) | Chris Froome | (Colombia) | Nairo Quintana (2) | |
| 103 | 2016 | (Slovakia) | Peter Sagan (5) | (Poland) | Rafał Majka (2) | (United Kingdom) | Adam Yates | |
| 104 | 2017 | (Australia) | Michael Matthews | (France) | Warren Barguil | (United Kingdom) | Simon Yates | |
| 105 | 2018 | (Slovakia) | Peter Sagan (6) | (France) | Julian Alaphilippe | (France) | Pierre Latour | |
| 106 | 2019 | (Slovakia) | Peter Sagan (7) | (France) | Romain Bardet | (Colombia) | Egan Bernal | |
| 107 | 2020 | (Republic of Ireland) | Sam Bennett | (Slovenia) | Tadej Pogačar | (Slovenia) | Tadej Pogačar | |
| 108 | 2021 | (United Kingdom) | Mark Cavendish (2) | (Slovenia) | Tadej Pogačar (2) | (Slovenia) | Tadej Pogačar (2) | |
| 109 | 2022 | (Belgium) | Wout Van Aert | (Denmark) | Jonas Vingegaard | (Slovenia) | Tadej Pogačar (3) | |
| 110 | 2023 | (Belgium) | Jasper Philipsen | (Italy) | Giulio Ciccone | (Slovenia) | Tadej Pogačar (4) | |
| 111 | 2024 | (Eritrea) | Biniam Girmay | (Ecuador) | Richard Carapaz | (Belgium) | Remco Evenepoel | |
| 112 | 2025 | (Italy) | Jonathan Milan | (Slovenia) | Tadej Pogačar (3) | (Germany) | Florian Lipowitz | |
| 113 | 2026 | (Denmark) | Mads Pedersen | (Ecuador) | Richard Carapaz (2) | (Mexico) | Isaac del Toro | |

== By nationality ==
Tour de France secondary classification winners by country
| Country | Points classification in the Tour de France | Mountains classification in the Tour de France | Young rider classification in the Tour de France | Total |
|---|---|---|---|---|
| France | 9 | 23 | 8 | 40 |
| Belgium | 21 | 11 | 1 | 33 |
| Spain | 1 | 18 | 5 | 24 |
| Italy | 3 | 13 | 5 | 21 |
| Germany | 8 | 0 | 5 | 13 |
| Netherlands | 4 | 2 | 5 | 11 |
| Colombia | 0 | 5 | 5 | 10 |
| Slovakia | 7 | 0 | 0 | 7 |
| Slovenia | 0 | 3 | 4 | 7 |
| Australia | 5 | 0 | 1 | 6 |
| Great Britain | 2 | 2 | 2 | 6 |
| Ireland | 5 | 0 | 0 | 5 |
| Luxembourg | 0 | 2 | 3 | 5 |
| Switzerland | 2 | 1 | 0 | 3 |
| United States | 0 | 0 | 3 | 3 |
| Uzbekistan | 3 | 0 | 0 | 3 |
| Denmark | 1 | 3 | 0 | 4 |
| Norway | 2 | 0 | 0 | 2 |
| Poland | 0 | 2 | 0 | 2 |
| Russia | 0 | 0 | 2 | 2 |
| Eritrea | 1 | 0 | 0 | 1 |
| Ecuador | 0 | 2 | 0 | 2 |
| Mexico | 0 | 0 | 2 | 2 |
| Ukraine | 0 | 0 | 1 | 1 |
