= 1984 Tour du Haut Var =

Race details
- Dates: 26 February 1984
- Stages: 1
- Distance: 202 km (125.5 mi)
- Winning time: 5h 54' 58"

Results
	Winner	Éric Caritoux (FRA)
	Second	Robert Millar (GBR)
	Third	Pascal Simon (FRA)

The 1984 Tour du Haut Var was the 16th edition of the Tour du Haut Var cycle race and was held on 26 February 1984. The race started and finished in Seillans. The race was won by Éric Caritoux.

== General classification ==
Final general classification

Rank	Rider	Time
1	Éric Caritoux (FRA)	5h 54' 58"
2	Robert Millar (GBR)	+ 8"
3	Pascal Simon (FRA)	+ 12"
4	Stephen Roche (IRL)	+ 12"
5	Kim Andersen (DEN)	+ 16"
6	Jean-Marie Grezet (SUI)	+ 30"
7	Marc Madiot (FRA)	+ 37"
8	Ferdi Van Den Haute (BEL)	+ 39"
9	Francis Castaing (FRA)	+ 50"
10	Patrick Bonnet (FRA)	+ 1' 02"
