= René Koppert =

Dutch cyclist

Personal information
- Born: 8 October 1960 (age 66)

Cycling career
- Sport: Cycling
- Current team: Retired
- Discipline: Road
- Role: Rider
- Rider type: Time trialist

Professional teams
- 1982: TI–Raleigh–Campagnolo
- 1983–1984: Termolan

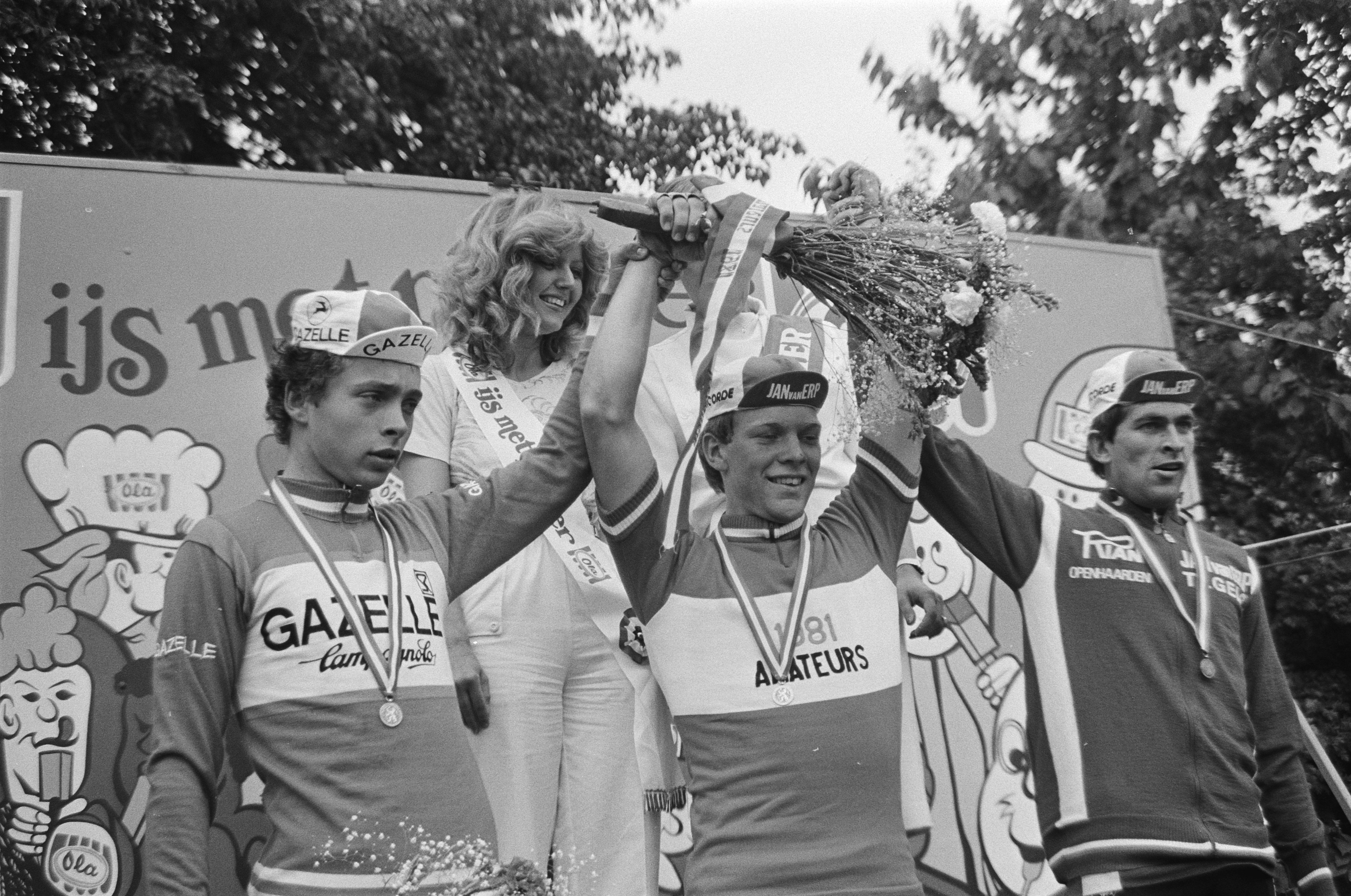
National Road Cycling Championships in Geulle (amateurs and women); Ad van de Poel (2nd), René Koppert (1st, new Dutch amateur champion), and Hans Boom, 1981

René Koppert (born 8 October 1960) is a Dutch former professional road racing cyclist.

== Major results ==
1980
1st Stage 3 Olympia's Tour
1st Prologue (TTT) Étoile des Espoirs
6th Ronde van Zuid-Holland
1981
1st Hel van het Mergelland
6th Overall Olympia's Tour

1st Stages 1a (TTT) & 7a

7th Gran Premio della Liberazione
1982
1st Prologue Tour de Romandie
1st Prologue Critérium du Dauphiné Libéré
Deutschland Tour

1st Prologue (TTT) & Stage 7a

1983
4th Maaslandse Pijl
6th Trofeo Laigueglia
10th Giro della Provincia di Reggio Calabria
1984
8th Milano–Torino

=== Grand Tour general classification results timeline ===
Grand Tour	1983	1984
Vuelta a España	—	—
Giro d'Italia	DNF	105
Tour de France	—	—

Legend
—	Did not compete
DNF	Did not finish
