= 1989 Tour of Britain =

Race details
- Dates: 29 August–3 September 1989
- Stages: 5 + Prologue
- Winning time: 20h 45' 10"

Results
| | Winner | Robert Millar (GBR) | (Z–Peugeot) |
| | Second | Mauro Gianetti (SUI) | (Helvetia–La Suisse) |
| | Third | Remig Stumpf (FRG) | (Toshiba) |
| | Points | Remig Stumpf (FRG) | (Toshiba) |
| | Mountains | Sean Kelly (IRL) | (PDM–Ultima–Concorde) |
| | Team | Helvetia–La Suisse | |

The 1989 Tour of Britain was the third edition of the Kellogg's Tour of Britain cycle race and was held from 29 August to 3 September 1989. The race started in Dundee and finished in London. The race was won by Robert Millar of the Z–Peugeot team.

== Route ==
Stage characteristics and winners
| Stage | Date | Course | Distance | Type | Winner |
|---|---|---|---|---|---|
| P | 29 August | Dundee | 2.7 km (1.7 mi) | Individual time trial | Malcolm Elliott (GBR) |
| 1 | 30 August | Dundee to Glasgow | 188 km (116.8 mi) | | Remig Stumpf (FRG) |
| 2 | 31 August | Manchester to Liverpool | 116 km (72.1 mi) | | Phil Anderson (AUS) |
| 3 | 1 September | Chester to Birmingham | 169 km (105.0 mi) | | Remig Stumpf (FRG) |
| 4 | 2 September | Birmingham to Cardiff | 227 km (141.1 mi) | | Mauro Gianetti (SUI) |
| 5 | 3 September | Westminster criterium | 100 km (62.1 mi) | Flat stage | Remig Stumpf (FRG) |

== General classification ==
Final general classification

| Rank | Rider | Team | Time |
|---|---|---|---|
| 1 | Robert Millar (GBR) | Z–Peugeot | 20h 45' 10" |
| 2 | Mauro Gianetti (SUI) | Helvetia–La Suisse | + 8" |
| 3 | Remig Stumpf (FRG) | Toshiba | + 4' 22" |
| 4 | Martin Earley (IRL) | PDM–Ultima–Concorde | + 4' 34" |
| 5 | Malcolm Elliott (GBR) | Teka | + 4' 45" |
| 6 | Paul Curran (GBR) | Percy Bilton | + 4' 57" |
| 7 | Phil Anderson (AUS) | TVM–Ragno | + 4' 59" |
| 8 | Guido Winterberg (SUI) | Helvetia–La Suisse | + 5' 04" |
| 9 | Sean Kelly (IRL) | PDM–Ultima–Concorde | + 5' 06" |
| 10 | Jaanus Kuum (NOR) | AD Renting–W-Cup–Bottecchia | + 5' 06" |
