= 1990 Critérium du Dauphiné Libéré =

Race details
- Dates: 28 May – 4 June 1990
- Stages: 8
- Distance: 1,297.2 km (806.0 mi)
- Winning time: 33h 42' 00"

Results
Jersey awarded to the overall winner	Winner	Robert Millar (GBR)	(Z–Tomasso)
	Second	Thierry Claveyrolat (FRA)	(RMO)
	Third	Álvaro Mejía (COL)	(Postobón–Manzana–Ryalcao)
Jersey awarded to the points classification winner	Points	Thierry Claveyrolat (FRA)	(RMO)
Jersey awarded to the mountains classification winner	Mountains	Thierry Claveyrolat (FRA)	(RMO)
Jersey awarded to the young rider classification winner	Young rider	Álvaro Mejía (COL)	(Postobón–Manzana–Ryalcao)
	Team	Z–Tomasso	

The 1990 Critérium du Dauphiné Libéré was the 42nd edition of the cycle race and was held from 28 May to 4 June 1990. The race started in Aix-les-Bains and finished in Annecy. The race was won by Robert Millar of the Z-Tomasso team.

== Teams ==
Sixteen teams, containing a total of 128 riders, participated in the race:

- RMO
- Z–Tomasso
- Toshiba
- Postobón–Manzana–Ryalcao
- Café de Colombia
- Castorama
- Helvetia–La Suisse
- Histor–Sigma
- Buckler–Colnago–Decca
- Lotto–Superclub
- Weinmann–SMM–Uster
- PDM–Concorde–Ultima
- 7-Eleven
- Chateau d'Ax–Salotti
- Kelme–Ibexpress
- Colombia amateur team

== Route ==
Stage characteristics and winners
Stage	Date	Course	Distance	Type	Stage winner
1	28 May	Aix-les-Bains to Aix-les-Bains	139 km (86 mi)	Flat stage	Rolf Gölz (FRG)
2	29 May	Aix-les-Bains to L'Isle-d'Abeau	183.9 km (114.3 mi)	Flat stage	Frédéric Moncassin (FRA)
3	30 May	Annonay to Aubenas	171 km (106 mi)	Medium mountain stage	Tony Rominger (SUI)
4	31 May	Vals-les-Bains to Avignon	183 km (114 mi)	Flat stage	Frédéric Moncassin (FRA)
5	1 June	Avignon to Gap	196 km (122 mi)	Hilly stage	Luc Leblanc (FRA)
6	2 June	Gap to Allevard-les-Bains	209 km (130 mi)	High mountain stage	Thierry Claveyrolat (FRA)
7	3 June	Allevard-les-Bains to Annecy	177.5 km (110.3 mi)	Medium mountain stage	Luc Roosen (BEL)
8	4 June	Annecy to Annecy	37.8 km (23.5 mi)	Individual time trial	Álvaro Mejía (COL)

== Stages ==
=== Stage 1 ===
28 May 1990 – Aix-les-Bains to Aix-les-Bains, 139 km (86.4 mi)

Stage 1 result

Rank	Rider	Team	Time
1	Rolf Gölz (FRG)	Buckler–Colnago–Decca	3h 41' 49"
2	Sammie Moreels (BEL)	Lotto–Superclub	s.t.
3	Atle Kvålsvoll (NOR)	Z–Tomasso	s.t.

General classification after Stage 1

Rank	Rider	Team	Time
1	Rolf Gölz (FRG)	Buckler–Colnago–Decca	3h 41' 49"
2	Sammie Moreels (BEL)	Lotto–Superclub	s.t.
3	Atle Kvålsvoll (NOR)	Z–Tomasso	s.t.

=== Stage 2 ===
29 May 1990 – Aix-les-Bains to L'Isle-d'Abeau, 183.9 km (114.3 mi)

Stage 2 result

Rank	Rider	Team	Time
1	Frédéric Moncassin (FRA)	Castorama	4h 47' 03"
2	John Vos (NED)	PDM–Concorde–Ultima	s.t.
3	Remig Stumpf (FRG)	Toshiba	s.t.

General classification after Stage 2

Rank	Rider	Team	Time
1	Rolf Gölz (FRG)	Buckler–Colnago–Decca	8h 28' 37"
2	Sammie Moreels (BEL)	Lotto–Superclub	+ 9"
3	Atle Kvålsvoll (NOR)	Z–Tomasso	+ 11"

=== Stage 3 ===
30 May 1990 – Annonay to Aubenas, 171 km (106.3 mi)

Stage 3 result

Rank	Rider	Team	Time
1	Tony Rominger (SUI)	Chateau d'Ax–Salotti	4h 25' 07"
2	Rolf Gölz (FRG)	Buckler–Colnago–Decca	s.t.
3	Álvaro Mejía (COL)	Postobón–Manzana–Ryalcao	+ 5"

General classification after Stage 3

Rank	Rider	Team	Time
1	Rolf Gölz (FRG)	Buckler–Colnago–Decca	12h 53' 38"
2	Tony Rominger (SUI)	Chateau d'Ax–Salotti	+ 11"
3	Álvaro Mejía (COL)	Postobón–Manzana–Ryalcao	+ 22"

=== Stage 4 ===
31 May 1990 – Vals-les-Bains to Avignon, 183 km (113.7 mi)

Stage 4 result

Rank	Rider	Team	Time
1	Frédéric Moncassin (FRA)	Castorama	4h 38' 05"
2	Eric Vanderaerden (BEL)	Buckler–Colnago–Decca	s.t.
3	Ron Kiefel (USA)	7-Eleven	s.t.

General classification after Stage 4

Rank	Rider	Team	Time
1	Tony Rominger (SUI)	Chateau d'Ax–Salotti	17h 31' 54"
2	Álvaro Mejía (COL)	Postobón–Manzana–Ryalcao	+ 11"
3	Fabio Parra (COL)	Kelme–Ibexpress	+ 20"

=== Stage 5 ===
1 June 1990 – Avignon to Gap, 196 km (121.8 mi)

Stage 5 result

Rank	Rider	Team	Time
1	Luc Leblanc (FRA)	Castorama	4h 54' 26"
2	Laurent Madouas (FRA)	Z–Tomasso	+ 1' 41"
3	Andreas Kappes (FRG)	Toshiba	+ 1' 42"

General classification after Stage 5

Rank	Rider	Team	Time
1	Luc Leblanc (FRA)	Castorama	22h 26' 45"
2	Tony Rominger (SUI)	Chateau d'Ax–Salotti	+ 1' 17"
3	Álvaro Mejía (COL)	Postobón–Manzana–Ryalcao	+ 1' 28"

=== Stage 6 ===
2 June 1990 – Gap to Allevard-les-Bains, 209 km (129.9 mi)

Stage 6 result

Rank	Rider	Team	Time
1	Thierry Claveyrolat (FRA)	RMO	5h 43' 19"
2	Robert Millar (GBR)	Z–Tomasso	+ 12"
3	Tony Rominger (SUI)	Chateau d'Ax–Salotti	+ 2' 43"

General classification after Stage 6

Rank	Rider	Team	Time
1	Thierry Claveyrolat (FRA)	RMO	28h 11' 44"
2	Robert Millar (GBR)	Z–Tomasso	+ 5"
3	Tony Rominger (SUI)	Chateau d'Ax–Salotti	+ 2' 16"

=== Stage 7 ===
3 June 1990 – Allevard-les-Bains to Annecy, 177.5 km (110.3 mi)

Stage 7 result

Rank	Rider	Team	Time
1	Luc Roosen (FRA)	Histor–Sigma	4h 41' 22"
2	Jean-François Bernard (FRA)	Z–Tomasso	s.t.
3	Thierry Claveyrolat (FRA)	RMO	s.t.

General classification after Stage 7

Rank	Rider	Team	Time
1	Thierry Claveyrolat (FRA)	Castorama	32h 53' 02"
2	Robert Millar (GBR)	Z–Tomasso	+ 9"
3	Tony Rominger (SUI)	Chateau d'Ax–Salotti	+ 3' 05"

=== Stage 8 ===
4 June 1990 – Annecy to Annecy, 37.8 km (23.5 mi)

Stage 8 result

Rank	Rider	Team	Time
1	Álvaro Mejía (COL)	Postobón–Manzana–Ryalcao	47' 04"
2	Johan Bruyneel (BEL)	Lotto–Superclub	+ 30"
3	Sean Yates (GBR)	7-Eleven	+ 1' 00"

General classification after Stage 8

Rank	Rider	Team	Time
1	Robert Millar (GBR)	Z–Tomasso	33h 42' 00"
2	Thierry Claveyrolat (FRA)	Castorama	+ 1' 35"
3	Álvaro Mejía (COL)	Postobón–Manzana–Ryalcao	+ 1' 56"

== General classification ==
Final general classification

Rank	Rider	Team	Time
1	Robert Millar (GBR)	Z–Tomasso	33h 42' 00"
2	Thierry Claveyrolat (FRA)	RMO	+ 1' 35"
3	Álvaro Mejía (COL)	Postobón–Manzana–Ryalcao	+ 1' 56"
4	Tony Rominger (SUI)	Chateau d'Ax–Salotti	+ 2' 35"
5	Fabio Parra (COL)	Kelme–Ibexpress	+ 5' 06"
6	Bruno Cornillet (FRA)	Z–Tomasso	+ 6' 05"
7	Stephen Roche (IRL)	Histor–Sigma	+ 6' 48"
8	Andrew Hampsten (USA)	7-Eleven	+ 6' 53"
9	Denis Roux (FRA)	Toshiba	+ 9' 39"
10	Oliverio Rincón (COL)	Postobón–Manzana–Ryalcao	+ 10' 42"
