= 1982 Critérium du Dauphiné Libéré =

Race details
- Dates: 31 May – 7 June 1982
- Stages: 7 + Prologue
- Distance: 1,301.9 km (809.0 mi)
- Winning time: 35h 25' 03"

Results
Jersey awarded to the overall winner	Winner	Michel Laurent (FRA)	(Peugeot–Shell–Michelin)
	Second	Jean-René Bernaudeau (FRA)	(Peugeot–Shell–Michelin)
	Third	Pascal Simon (FRA)	(Peugeot–Shell–Michelin)
Jersey awarded to the points classification winner	Points	Sean Kelly (IRL)	(Sem–France Loire–Campagnolo)
Jersey awarded to the mountains classification winner	Mountains	Jean-René Bernaudeau (FRA)	(Peugeot–Shell–Michelin)
	Team	Peugeot–Shell–Michelin	

The 1982 Critérium du Dauphiné Libéré was the 34th edition of the cycle race and was held from 31 May to 7 June 1982. The race started in Avignon and finished in Annecy. The race was won by Michel Laurent of the Peugeot-Shell-Michelin team.

== Teams ==
Eleven teams, containing a total of 99 riders, participated in the race:

- Renault–Elf–Gitane
- Peugeot–Shell–Michelin
- La Redoute–Motobécane
- Teka
- COOP–Mercier–Mavic
- Wolber–Spidel
- Sem–France Loire–Campagnolo
- TI–Raleigh–Campagnolo
- Splendor–Wickes Bouwmarkt
- Cilo–Aufina
- Fangio

== Route ==
Stage characteristics and winners
Stage	Date	Course	Distance	Type	Winner
P	31 May	Avignon	2.5 km (1.6 mi)	Individual time trial	René Koppert (NED)
1	1 June	Avignon to Tournon	215 km (134 mi)		Ad Wijnands (NED)
2	2 June	Tain-l'Hermitage to Saint-Chamond	197 km (122 mi)		Jacques Michaud (FRA)
3	3 June	Saint-Chamond to Digoin	195 km (121 mi)		Patrick Perret (FRA)
4a	4 June	Paray-le-Monial to Bourg-en-Bresse	112 km (70 mi)		Bernard Vallet (FRA)
4b	4 June	Bourg-en-Bresse to Lyon	90 km (56 mi)		Pascal Jules (FRA)
5	5 June	Bourgoin to Bastille	187.5 km (116.5 mi)		Robert Alban (FRA)
6	6 June	Grenoble to Grenoble	159 km (99 mi)		René Bittinger (FRA)
7a	7 June	Voiron to Annecy	106.5 km (66.2 mi)		Gilbert Glaus (SUI)
7b	7 June	Annecy	37.4 km (23.2 mi)	Individual time trial	Bernard Vallet (FRA)

== General classification ==
Final general classification

Rank	Rider	Team	Time
1	Michel Laurent (FRA)	Peugeot–Shell–Michelin	35h 25' 03"
2	Jean-René Bernaudeau (FRA)	Peugeot–Shell–Michelin	+ 28"
3	Pascal Simon (FRA)	Peugeot–Shell–Michelin	+ 45"
4	Pierre Bazzo (FRA)	La Redoute–Motobécane	+ 8' 36"
5	René Bittinger (FRA)	Sem–France Loire–Campagnolo	+ 9' 28"
6	Sven-Åke Nilsson (SWE)	Wolber–Spidel	+ 11' 01"
7	Phil Anderson (AUS)	Peugeot–Shell–Michelin	+ 11' 01"
8	Bernard Vallet (FRA)	La Redoute–Motobécane	+ 11' 24"
9	Ismael Lejarreta (ESP)	Teka	+ 11' 54"
10	Robert Alban (FRA)	La Redoute–Motobécane	+ 12' 55"
