= 1984 Tirreno–Adriatico =

Race details
- Dates: 8–14 March 1984
- Stages: 6 + Prologue
- Distance: 1,042.9 km (648.0 mi)
- Winning time: 28h 39' 41"

Results
	Winner	Tommy Prim (SWE)	(Bianchi–Piaggio)
	Second	Erich Maechler (SUI)	(Cilo–Aufina–Crans–Montana)
	Third	Roberto Visentini (ITA)	(Carrera–Inoxpran)

The 1984 Tirreno–Adriatico was the 19th edition of the Tirreno–Adriatico cycle race and was held from 8 March to 14 March 1984. The race started in Forio Ischia and finished in San Benedetto del Tronto. The race was won by Tommy Prim of the Bianchi team.

== General classification ==
Final general classification

Rank	Rider	Team	Time
1	Tommy Prim (SWE)	Bianchi–Piaggio	28h 39' 41"
2	Erich Maechler (SUI)	Cilo–Aufina–Crans–Montana	+ 2"
3	Roberto Visentini (ITA)	Carrera–Inoxpran	+ 5"
4	Adri van der Poel (NED)	Kwantum–Decosol–Yoko	+ 14"
5	Greg LeMond (USA)	Renault–Elf	+ 23"
6	Giuseppe Petito (ITA)	Alfa Lum–Olmo	+ 29"
7	Stefan Mutter (SUI)	Cilo–Aufina–Crans–Montana	+ 39"
8	Johan van der Velde (NED)	Metauro Mobili–Pinarello	+ 40"
9	Joop Zoetemelk (NED)	Kwantum–Decosol–Yoko	+ 42"
10	Alfredo Chinetti (ITA)	Supermercati Brianzoli	+ 43"
