= 1982 Tour de Suisse =

Race details
- Dates: 16–25 June 1982
- Stages: 9 + Prologue
- Distance: 1,673 km (1,040 mi)
- Winning time: 43h 16' 12"

Results
	Winner	Giuseppe Saronni (ITA)	(Del Tongo)
	Second	Theo de Rooij (NED)	(Capri Sonne–Campagnolo–Merckx)
	Third	Guido Van Calster (BEL)	(Del Tongo)

The 1982 Tour de Suisse was the 46th edition of the Tour de Suisse cycle race and was held from 16 June to 25 June 1982. The race started in Volketswil and finished in Zürich. The race was won by Giuseppe Saronni of the Del Tongo team.

== General classification ==
Final general classification

Rank	Rider	Team	Time
1	Giuseppe Saronni (ITA)	Del Tongo	43h 16' 12"
2	Theo de Rooij (NED)	Capri Sonne–Campagnolo–Merckx	+ 1' 22"
3	Guido Van Calster (BEL)	Del Tongo	+ 5' 34"
4	Beat Breu (SUI)	Cilo–Aufina	+ 6' 33"
5	Jostein Wilmann (NOR)	Capri Sonne–Campagnolo–Merckx	+ 7' 37"
6	Daniel Müller (SUI)	Royal-Wrangler	+ 9' 02"
7	Stefan Mutter (SUI)	Puch–Eorotex–Campagnolo	+ 9' 03"
8	Roberto Visentini (ITA)	Sammontana–Benotto	+ 9' 36"
9	Jean-Marie Grezet (SUI)	Cilo–Aufina	+ 9' 41"
10	Fridolin Keller (SUI)	Royal-Wrangler	+ 10' 10"
