= 1981 Paris–Nice =

Race details
- Dates: 11–18 March 1981
- Stages: 7 + Prologue
- Distance: 1,109 km (689.1 mi)
- Winning time: 30h 17' 50"

Results
Jersey awarded to the overall winner	Winner	Stephen Roche (IRL)	(Peugeot–Esso–Michelin)
	Second	Adri van der Poel (NED)	(DAF Trucks–Côte d'Or)
	Third	Alfons De Wolf (BEL)	(Vermeer Thijs)

The 1981 Paris–Nice was the 39th edition of the Paris–Nice cycle race and was held from 11 March to 18 March 1981. The race started in Meaux and finished at the Col d'Èze. The race was won by Stephen Roche of the Peugeot team.

== Route ==
Stage characteristics and winners
Stage	Date	Course	Distance	Type	Winner
P	11 March	Meaux	7.3 km (4.5 mi)	Individual time trial	Knut Knudsen (NOR)
1	12 March	Joigny to Château-Chinon	177 km (110 mi)		Silvano Contini (ITA)
2a	13 March	Château-Chinon to Bourbon-Lancy	101 km (63 mi)		Roger De Vlaeminck (BEL)
2b	13 March	Bourbon-Lancy	27 km (17 mi)	Team time trial	Peugeot–Esso–Michelin
3	14 March	Bourbon-Lancy to Saint-Étienne	217 km (135 mi)		Adri van der Poel (NED)
4	15 March	Bollène to Miramas	189 km (117 mi)		Roger De Vlaeminck (BEL)
5	16 March	Miramas to Le Castellet	175 km (109 mi)		Tommy Prim (SWE)
6	17 March	La Seyne-sur-Mer to Mandelieu-la-Napoule	175 km (109 mi)		Phil Anderson (AUS)
7a	18 March	Mandelieu to Nice	57.5 km (35.7 mi)		Jean-Luc Vandenbroucke (BEL)
7b	18 March	Col d'Èze	11 km (6.8 mi)	Individual time trial	Stephen Roche (IRL)

== General classification ==
Final general classification

Rank	Rider	Team	Time
1	Stephen Roche (IRL)	Peugeot–Esso–Michelin	30h 17' 50"
2	Adri van der Poel (NED)	DAF Trucks–Côte d'Or	+ 1' 19"
3	Alfons De Wolf (BEL)	Vermeer Thijs	+ 1' 55"
4	Pierre Bazzo (FRA)	La Redoute–Motobécane	+ 3' 22"
5	Peter Zijerveld (NED)	HB Alarmsystemen	+ 3' 24"
6	Serge Beucherie (FRA)	Sem–France Loire–Campagnolo	+ 4' 19"
7	Bernardo Alfonsel (ESP)	Teka–Campagnolo	+ 4' 39"
8	Jacques Bossis (FRA)	Peugeot–Esso–Michelin	+ 5' 11"
9	Jean-Luc Vandenbroucke (BEL)	La Redoute–Motobécane	+ 8' 15"
10	Régis Clère (FRA)	Miko–Mercier–Vivagel	+ 9' 44"
