= 1983 Tour de Romandie =

Race details
- Dates: 3–8 May 1983
- Stages: 5 + Prologue
- Distance: 826.7 km (513.7 mi)
- Winning time: 21h 10' 05"

Results
	Winner	Stephen Roche (IRL)	(Peugeot–Shell–Michelin)
	Second	Phil Anderson (AUS)	(Peugeot–Shell–Michelin)
	Third	Tommy Prim (SWE)	(Bianchi–Piaggio)

The 1983 Tour de Romandie was the 37th edition of the Tour de Romandie cycle race and was held from 3 May to 8 May 1983. The race started in Bulle and finished in Vernier. The race was won by Stephen Roche of the Peugeot team.

== General classification ==
Final general classification
Rank	Rider	Team	Time
1	Stephen Roche (IRL)	Peugeot–Shell–Michelin	21h 10' 05"
2	Phil Anderson (AUS)	Peugeot–Shell–Michelin	+ 55"
3	Tommy Prim (SWE)	Bianchi–Piaggio	+ 2' 10"
4	Dag Erik Pedersen (NOR)	Bianchi–Piaggio	+ 2' 21"
5	Gerard Veldscholten (NED)	TI–Raleigh–Campagnolo	+ 2' 23"
6	Pascal Simon (FRA)	Peugeot–Shell–Michelin	+ 2' 43"
7	Roberto Visentini (ITA)	Inoxpran	+ 2' 57"
8	Jérôme Simon (FRA)	La Redoute–Motobécane	+ 2' 57"
9	Gianbattista Baronchelli (ITA)	Sammontana	+ 3' 03"
10	Michel Laurent (FRA)	COOP–Mercier–Mavic	+ 3' 14"
