= Jostein Wilmann =

Norwegian cyclist

Personal information
- Born: 15 July 1953 (age 73) Viggja, Norway

Cycling career
- Sport: Cycling
- Current team: Retired
- Discipline: Road
- Role: Rider
- Rider type: All-rounder

Professional teams
- 1980: Puch–Sem–Campagnolo
- 1981–1982: Capri Sonne
- 1983: Eorotex–Magniflex

Major wins
- Stage races Tour of Austria (1978) Tour de Romandie (1982) Setmana Catalana de Ciclisme (1982)

Jostein Wilmann (born 15 July 1953) is a Norwegian former professional road racing cyclist. His best performance came in the Tour de France of 1980, where he finished 14th overall. This was the best result any Norwegian cyclist has achieved in the Tour de France general classification until 2025. He is also the only Norwegian cyclist to win the Tour de Romandie and the Setmana Catalana de Ciclisme, taking both victories in 1982. He is the father of racing cyclist Frederik Wilmann.

== Major results ==
1975
1st Stage 5a GP Tell
2nd Overall Rheinland-Pfalz-Rundfahrt
1976
3rd Overall Okolo Slovenska
1977
7th Overall GP Tell
1978
1st Overall Tour of Austria

1st Stage 4

1979
1st Overall Rheinland-Pfalz-Rundfahrt
3rd Team time trial, UCI Road World Championships
3rd Overall Tour de l'Avenir
1980
1st GP Union Dortmund
4th Overall Deutschland Tour
1981
3rd Druivenkoers-Overijse
5th Overall Tour of Belgium
10th Overall Deutschland Tour
10th Tour du Nord-Ouest
1982
1st Overall Tour de Romandie

1st Stage 2

1st Overall Setmana Catalana de Ciclisme
1st Stage 5a Deutschland Tour
2nd La Flèche Wallonne
2nd Rund um den Henninger Turm
5th Overall Tour de Suisse
6th Overall Super Prestige Pernod
6th Züri-Metzgete
9th Amstel Gold Race
1983
2nd Grand Prix Cerami
6th Overall Driedaagse van De Panne-Koksijde
7th Overall Tour de Suisse

=== Grand Tour general classification results timeline ===
Grand Tour	1980	1981	1982	1983
Giro d'Italia	—	—	—	13
Tour de France	14	34	DNF	—
Vuelta a España	—	—	—	—

=== Major stage race general classification results timeline ===
Major stage race general classification results timeline
Race	1980	1981	1982	1983
Tour de Suisse	21	22	5	7
Tour de Romandie	13	—	1	—

=== Monuments and Classics results timeline ===
Monuments results timeline
	1980	1981	1982	1983
Milan–San Remo	40	—	—	40
Tour of Flanders	—	—	35	—
Paris–Roubaix	23	—	—	—
Liège–Bastogne–Liège	21	—	—	29
Giro di Lombardia	—	—	—	—
Classics results timeline
	1980	1981	1982	1983
Amstel Gold Race	—	43	9	27
La Flèche Wallonne	—	66	2	32
Gent–Wevelgem	47	—	—	—
Paris–Tours	—	94	—	—

Legend
—	Did not compete
DNF	Did not finish
