= 1993 GP Ouest-France =

Race details
- Dates: 24 August 1993
- Stages: 1
- Distance: 209 km (129.9 mi)
- Winning time: 5h 09' 25"

Results
	Winner	Thierry Claveyrolat (FRA)	(GAN)
	Second	Jean-François Bernard (FRA)	(Banesto)
	Third	Thierry Laurent (FRA)	(Novemail–Histor–Laser Computer)

The 1993 GP Ouest-France was the 57th edition of the GP Ouest-France cycle race and was held on 24 August 1993. The race started and finished in Plouay. Thierry Claveyrolat of the Gan team won the race.

== General classification ==
Final general classification

Rank	Rider	Team	Time
1	Thierry Claveyrolat (FRA)	GAN	5h 09' 25"
2	Jean-François Bernard (FRA)	Banesto	+ 1"
3	Thierry Laurent (FRA)	Novemail–Histor–Laser Computer	+ 14"
4	Laurent Jalabert (FRA)	ONCE	+ 16"
5	Andrei Tchmil (MDA)	Motorola	+ 16"
6	Jean-Claude Colotti (FRA)	GAN	+ 16"
7	Mario De Clercq (BEL)	Lotto	+ 16"
8	Tristan Hoffman (NED)	TVM–Bison Kit	+ 16"
9	Willy Willems (BEL)	Collstrop–Assur Carpets	+ 16"
10	Bruno Cornillet (FRA)	Novemail–Histor–Laser Computer	+ 16"
