= Tommy Prim =

Swedish cyclist

Personal information
- Full name: Leif Tommy Prim
- Born: 29 July 1955 (age 71) Svenljunga, Sweden

Cycling career
- Sport: Cycling
- Current team: Retired
- Discipline: Road
- Role: Rider

Professional team
- 1980–1986: Bianchi–Piaggio

Major wins
- Grand Tours Giro d'Italia 1 individual stage (1980) Stage races Tour de Romandie (1981) Tirreno–Adriatico (1984) One-day races and Classics National Road Race Championships (1976) National Time Trial Championships (1979) Paris–Brussels (1983)

Tommy Prim (born 29 July 1955) is a retired Swedish professional cyclist who rode for the Italian Bianchi team between the years of 1980 and 1986. In 1983 he became the first Scandinavian rider to win a classic race when he was victorious in Paris–Brussels, his other career highlights include winning Tirreno–Adriatico and the Tour de Romandie as well as twice finishing runner up in the Giro d'Italia in 1981 and 1982.

== Biography ==
Prim rode for the local CK Wano cycling club in Varberg as a youngster and became Swedish Junior champion in 1972, as an amateur he was Swedish champion in 1976 and 1979 as well the Scandinavian amateur champion in 1975 and 1976. He took the under 22 classification of the Tour of Britain in 1976, in what was his first trip abroad with the Swedish national team. He competed in the team time trial event at the 1976 Summer Olympics.

In 1978 and 1979 Prim turned in top class performances in the highly rated Italian stage race Settimana Bergamasca, which has been won by some of the Worlds top riders before they turned professional. Prim's feats in the Bergamasca race caught the eye of the top professional teams and at the end of 1979 Prim turned professional with the Italian Bianchi–Piaggio squad, a decision which was made easier by the presence of fellow Scandinavians Knut Knudsen and Alf Segersäll in that team. His team manager would be master tactician Giancarlo Ferretti.

Prim's made an immediate impact as a professional in his debut season of 1980, he finished seventh in the early season Tour of Sardinia and was part of the Bianchi team that won the team time trial stage at Paris–Nice, this good form ensured him a ride in the Giro d'Italia where he took a stage into Teramo as well as finishing fourth overall and taking the young riders jersey. He was also disqualified after winning the stage into Sorrento when he rode Italian sprinter Giovanni Mantovani into the barriers. Later that season he won the Italian one day race the Coppa Ugo Agostoni.

Prim went to the 1981 Giro d'Italia in top form after winning the Tour de Romandie just prior to the Italian race, he ended up taking the runners up spot behind Giovanni Battaglin, many observers felt that Prim could have won the 1981 Giro if his Bianchi squad had backed him solely instead of having three team leaders (Italians Silvano Contini and Giambattista Baronchelli were the others). In 1982 Prim finished runner up once again in the Giro, beaten by the tactically astute Bernard Hinault. In 1983 he entered the Giro as sole team leader for Bianchi and everything started well when he took the leaders pink jersey after the first stage team time trial, however, his form in the mountains was uncharacteristically poor and he eventually finished a disappointing 15th overall. In September 1983 he won the Paris–Brussels, which at that time was still regarded as a "Classic" race, he went clear with an early break which stayed away for 280 kilometres, he dropped his breakaway companions on the Alsemberg climb just before the finish and remained clear until the finish to become the first Scandinavian rider to win a classic race.

1984 promised great things when Prim won the Tirreno–Adriatico stage race in Italy but his season was ruined when he crashed a few days before the Giro. 1985 saw the team renamed as Sammontana–Bianchi, with a new manager Wladimiro Bortolozzi, Moreno Argentin was brought in to be joint team leader with Tommy. Prim finished that year's Giro in fourth place behind three of the cycling world superstars, Bernard Hinault, Francesco Moser and Greg LeMond. 1986 saw Prim ride a disappointing Giro d'Italia when he finished 21st overall, this prompted his team to say they would not ride the Tour of Sweden which they had always done since its reintroduction in 1982. Tommy's reaction to this was to announce his retirement from cycling midway through the 1986 season at the young age of 31, he was feeling tired and felt he could no longer give it 100%.

After his retirement from cycle racing, Tommy opened a bike shop back in his native Sweden, he then moved to other employment working for a mail order firm, a saw mill and then a salmon smokery. In 2000, Tommy was offered the chance to become team manager at the small UCI registered Team Crescent, a Swedish pro squad which was to promote Swedish under 23 riders. He has had some success in bringing through talented riders as the team evolved from Team Crescent to Bianchi Scandinavia to Bianchi Nordic. The team folded at the end of the 2004 season.

== Major results ==
1972
1st Time trial, National Junior Road Championships
1976
1st Road race, National Road Championships
8th Overall Trophée Peugeot de l'Avenir

1st Stage 3

1978
2nd Overall Flèche du Sud
9th Overall Grand Prix Guillaume Tell
1979
1st Time trial, National Road Championships
Giro Ciclistico d'Italia

1st Stages 3 & 4

1980
1st Coppa Ugo Agostoni
2nd Overall Deutschland Tour
2nd Overall Giro del Trentino
4th Overall Giro d'Italia

1st Stage 15

4th Overall Paris–Nice

1st Stage 2

7th Overall Giro di Sardegna
9th Giro dell'Emilia
9th Gran Premio Città di Camaiore
1981
1st Overall Tour de Romandie
1st Trofeo Pantalica
1st Stage 5 Paris–Nice
2nd Overall Giro d'Italia
3rd Overall Deutschland Tour
5th Trofeo Laigueglia
6th Giro di Lombardia
6th Giro di Romagna
1982
1st Overall Tour of Sweden

1st Stage 7b (ITT)

2nd Overall Giro d'Italia
2nd Overall Tour de Romandie

1st Stage 1

2nd Gran Premio Industria e Commercio di Prato
3rd Overall Setmana Catalana de Ciclisme

1st Stage 1

3rd Züri-Metzgete
5th Liège–Bastogne–Liège
5th Milan–San Remo
1983
1st Overall Tour of Sweden

1st Stage 6b (ITT) & 8

1st Paris–Brussels
3rd Overall Tour de Romandie

1st Stage 5b (ITT)

3rd Trofeo Baracchi
8th Overall Giro di Sardegna
1984
1st Overall Tirreno–Adriatico
2nd Trofeo Baracchi
4th Giro di Lombardia
1985
1st Stage 3b Danmark Rundt
3rd Overall Tour de Romandie

1st Stage 5a (ITT)

4th Overall Giro d'Italia
8th Overall Tour of Sweden

1st Stage 6a (ITT)
