= 1989 Critérium du Dauphiné Libéré =

Race details
- Dates: 29 May – 5 June 1989
- Stages: 7 + Prologue
- Distance: 1,223.7 km (760.4 mi)
- Winning time: 33h 54' 03"

Results
Jersey awarded to the overall winner	Winner	Charly Mottet (FRA)	(RMO)
	Second	Robert Millar (GBR)	(Z–Peugeot)
	Third	Thierry Claveyrolat (FRA)	(RMO)
Jersey awarded to the points classification winner	Points	Thierry Claveyrolat (FRA)	(RMO)
Jersey awarded to the mountains classification winner	Mountains	Robert Millar (GBR)	(Z–Peugeot)
	Combination	Thierry Claveyrolat (FRA)	(RMO)

The 1989 Critérium du Dauphiné Libéré was the 41st edition of the cycle race and was held from 29 May to 5 June 1989. The race started in Divonne-les-Bains and finished in Aix-les-Bains. The race was won by Charly Mottet of the RMO team.

== Teams ==
Fifteen teams, containing a total of 119 riders, participated in the race:

- Café de Colombia
- Helvetia–La Suisse
- Super U–Raleigh–Fiat
- Toshiba
- Teka
- RMO
- Superconfex–Yoko–Opel–Colnago
- Z–Peugeot
- PDM–Ultima–Concorde
- Postobón–Manzana
- Lotto–Vlaanderen–Jong–Mbk–Merckx
- Histor–Sigma
- Domex–Weinmann
- Colombia amateur team
- USSR amateur team

== Route ==
Stage characteristics and winners
Stage	Date	Course	Distance	Type	Winner
P	29 May	Divonne-les-Bains	5 km (3.1 mi)	Individual time trial	Steve Bauer (CAN)
1	30 May	Aix-les-Bains to Lyon	186 km (116 mi)		Pascal Poisson (FRA)
2	31 May	Lyon to Saint-Étienne	186 km (116 mi)		Thomas Wegmüller (SUI)
3	1 June	Montélimar to Carpentras	183.5 km (114.0 mi)		Charly Mottet (FRA)
4	2 June	Carpentras to Valence	155.7 km (96.7 mi)		Sean Kelly (IRL)
5	3 June	Crest to Grenoble	230 km (140 mi)		Thierry Claveyrolat (FRA)
6a	4 June	Grenoble to Aix-les-Bains	84.5 km (52.5 mi)		Gérard Rué (FRA)
6b	4 June	Aix-les-Bains to Mont Revard	30 km (19 mi)	Individual time trial	Robert Millar (GBR)
7	5 June	Aix-les-Bains	163 km (101 mi)		Peter De Clercq (BEL)

== General classification ==
Final general classification

Rank	Rider	Team	Time
1	Charly Mottet (FRA)	RMO	33h 54' 03"
2	Robert Millar (GBR)	Z–Peugeot	+ 18"
3	Thierry Claveyrolat (FRA)	RMO	+ 1' 50"
4	Fabrice Philipot (FRA)	Toshiba	+ 2' 49"
5	Laurent Bezault (FRA)	Toshiba	+ 2' 56"
6	Martial Gayant (FRA)	Toshiba	+ 3' 58"
7	Éric Caritoux (FRA)	RMO	+ 4' 26"
8	Héctor Patarroyo (COL)	Postobón–Manzana	+ 5' 10"
9	Mariano Sánchez (ESP)	Teka	+ 6' 14"
10	Alberto Camargo (COL)	Café de Colombia	+ 7' 09"
