= 1982 La Flèche Wallonne =

Race details
- Dates: 15 April 1982
- Stages: 1
- Distance: 251 km (156.0 mi)
- Winning time: 6h 42' 00"

Results
	Winner	Mario Beccia (ITA)	(Hoonved–Bottecchia)
	Second	Jostein Wilmann (NOR)	(Capri Sonne–Campagnolo–Merckx)
	Third	Paul Haghedooren (BEL)	(Capri Sonne–Campagnolo–Merckx)

The 1982 La Flèche Wallonne was the 46th edition of La Flèche Wallonne cycle race and was held on 15 April 1982. The race started in Charleroi and finished in Spa. The race was won by Mario Beccia of the Hoonved–Bottecchia team.

== General classification ==
Final general classification

Rank	Rider	Team	Time
1	Mario Beccia (ITA)	Hoonved–Bottecchia	6h 42' 00"
2	Jostein Wilmann (NOR)	Capri Sonne–Campagnolo–Merckx	+ 1"
3	Paul Haghedooren (BEL)	Capri Sonne–Campagnolo–Merckx	+ 14"
4	Ad Wijnands (NED)	TI–Raleigh–Campagnolo	+ 14"
5	Hennie Kuiper (NED)	DAF Trucks–TeVe Blad	+ 14"
6	Hans Langerijs (NED)	B&S–Elro–Concorde	+ 20"
7	Giuseppe Saronni (ITA)	Del Tongo	+ 27"
8	Sean Kelly (IRL)	Sem–France Loire–Campagnolo	+ 27"
9	Phil Anderson (AUS)	Peugeot–Shell–Michelin	+ 27"
10	Alfons De Wolf (BEL)	Vermeer Thijs	+ 27"
