= 1978 La Flèche Wallonne =

Race details
- Dates: 20 April 1978
- Stages: 1
- Distance: 223 km (138.6 mi)
- Winning time: 5h 56' 22"

Results
	Winner	Michel Laurent (FRA)	(Peugeot–Esso–Michelin)
	Second	Gianbattista Baronchelli (ITA)	(Scic–Bottecchia)
	Third	Dietrich Thurau (FRG)	(IJsboerke–Gios)

The 1978 La Flèche Wallonne was the 42nd edition of La Flèche Wallonne cycle race and was held on 20 April 1978. The race started and finished in Verviers. The race was won by Michel Laurent of the Peugeot team.

== General classification ==
Final general classification

Rank	Rider	Team	Time
1	Michel Laurent (FRA)	Peugeot–Esso–Michelin	5h 56' 22"
2	Gianbattista Baronchelli (ITA)	Scic–Bottecchia	+ 0"
3	Dietrich Thurau (FRG)	IJsboerke–Gios	+ 0"
4	Gerrie Knetemann (NED)	TI–Raleigh–McGregor	+ 0"
5	Michel Pollentier (BEL)	Flandria–Velda–Lano	+ 0"
6	Hennie Kuiper (NED)	TI–Raleigh–McGregor	+ 0"
7	Joop Zoetemelk (NED)	Miko–Mercier–Vivagel	+ 0"
8	Henk Lubberding (NED)	TI–Raleigh–McGregor	+ 1' 15"
9	Sven-Åke Nilsson (SWE)	Miko–Mercier–Vivagel	+ 1' 15"
10	Joseph Bruyère (BEL)	C&A	+ 1' 50"
