= 1989 Tour of the Basque Country =

Race details
- Dates: 3–7 April 1989
- Stages: 5
- Distance: 676.1 km (420.1 mi)
- Winning time: 17h 14' 07"

Results
	Winner	Stephen Roche (IRL)	(Fagor–MBK)
	Second	Federico Echave (ESP)	(BH)
	Third	Jesús Blanco Villar (ESP)	(Seur)

The 1989 Tour of the Basque Country was the 29th edition of the Tour of the Basque Country cycle race and was held from 3 April to 7 April 1989. The race started in Lazkao and finished in Zumaia. The race was won by Stephen Roche of the Fagor team.

== General classification ==
Final general classification

Rank	Rider	Team	Time
1	Stephen Roche (IRL)	Fagor–MBK	17h 14' 07"
2	Federico Echave (ESP)	BH	+ 1"
3	Jesús Blanco Villar (ESP)	Seur	+ 3"
4	Pedro Muñoz (ESP)	ONCE	+ 5"
5	Álvaro Pino (ESP)	BH	+ 10"
6	Julián Gorospe (ESP)	Reynolds	+ 11"
7	Eric Van Lancker (BEL)	Panasonic–Isostar–Colnago–Agu	+ 15"
8	Marino Lejarreta (ESP)	Caja Rural	+ 19"
9	José Luis Laguía (ESP)	Reynolds	+ 24"
10	Roland Le Clerc (FRA)	Caja Rural	+ 25"
