= 1976 Paris–Nice =

Race details
- Dates: 7–14 March 1976
- Stages: 7 + Prologue
- Distance: 1,205 km (748.8 mi)
- Winning time: 31h 42' 20"

Results
Jersey awarded to the overall winner	Winner	Michel Laurent (FRA)	(Miko–de Gribaldy–Superia)
	Second	Hennie Kuiper (NED)	(TI–Raleigh–Campagnolo)
	Third	Luis Ocaña (ESP)	(Super Ser)

The 1976 Paris–Nice was the 34th edition of the Paris–Nice cycle race and was held from 7 March to 14 March 1976. The race started in Paris and finished in Nice. The race was won by Michel Laurent of the Miko–de Gribaldy team.

== General classification ==
Final general classification

Rank	Rider	Team	Time
1	Michel Laurent (FRA)	Miko–de Gribaldy–Superia	31h 42' 20"
2	Hennie Kuiper (NED)	TI–Raleigh–Campagnolo	+ 17"
3	Luis Ocaña (ESP)	Super Ser	+ 26"
4	Freddy Maertens (BEL)	Flandria–Velda–West Vlaams Vleesbedrijf	+ 55"
5	Enrique Martínez Heredia (ESP)	Kas–Campagnolo	+ 2' 30"
6	Bernard Vallet (FRA)	Gan–Mercier–Hutchinson	+ 2' 50"
7	Wilfried Wesemael (FRA)	Miko–de Gribaldy–Superia	+ 2' 53"
8	Joop Zoetemelk (NED)	Gan–Mercier–Hutchinson	+ 3' 19"
9	José Luis Uribezubia (ESP)	Super Ser	+ 3' 20"
10	Gerrie Knetemann (NED)	TI–Raleigh–Campagnolo	+ 3' 25"
