= 1991 Critérium du Dauphiné Libéré =

Race details
- Dates: 3–10 June 1991
- Stages: 8
- Distance: 1,101.5 km (684.4 mi)
- Winning time: 28h 38' 09"

Results
Jersey awarded to the overall winner	Winner	Luis Herrera (COL)	(Postobón–Manzana–Ryalcao)
	Second	Laudelino Cubino (ESP)	(Amaya Seguros)
	Third	Tony Rominger (SUI)	(Toshiba)
Jersey awarded to the points classification winner	Points	Viatcheslav Ekimov (RUS)	(Panasonic–Sportlife)
Jersey awarded to the mountains classification winner	Mountains	Thierry Claveyrolat (FRA)	(RMO)

The 1991 Critérium du Dauphiné Libéré was the 43rd edition of the cycle race and was held from 3 June to 10 June 1991. The race started in Chamonix and finished in Aix-les-Bains. The race was won by Luis Herrera of the Postobón team.

== Teams ==
Sixteen teams, containing a total of 128 riders, participated in the race:

- Z
- RMO
- Postobón–Manzana–Ryalcao
- Toshiba
- Kelme–Ibexpress
- Histor–Sigma
- Motorola
- Helvetia–La Suisse
- Lotto
- Buckler–Colnago–Decca
- Panasonic–Sportlife
- PDM–Concorde–Ultima
- Tonton Tapis–GB
- Castorama–Raleigh
- Amaya Seguros
- Mosoca–Chazal

== Route ==
Stage characteristics and winners
Stage	Date	Course	Distance	Type	Winner
1	3 June	Chamonix	10 km (6.2 mi)	Individual time trial	Thierry Marie (FRA)
2	4 June	Chamonix to Cluses	153 km (95 mi)		John Talen (NED)
3	5 June	Cluses to Vienne	222 km (138 mi)		Jean-Paul van Poppel (NED)
4	6 June	Annonay to Vals-les-Bains	184 km (114 mi)		Henri Abadie (FRA)
5	7 June	Privas to Orange	186.5 km (115.9 mi)		Sean Yates (GBR)
6	8 June	Crest to Villard-de-Lans	155 km (96 mi)		Luis Herrera (COL)
7	9 June	Villard-de-Lans to Aix-les-Bains	158 km (98 mi)		Laudelino Cubino (ESP)
8	10 June	Aix-les-Bains	33 km (21 mi)	Individual time trial	Tony Rominger (SUI)

== General classification ==
Final general classification

Rank	Rider	Team	Time
1	Luis Herrera (COL)	Postobón–Manzana–Ryalcao	28h 38' 09"
2	Laudelino Cubino (ESP)	Amaya Seguros	+ 46"
3	Tony Rominger (SUI)	Toshiba	+ 1' 18"
4	Robert Millar (GBR)	Z	+ 4' 20"
5	Oliverio Rincón (COL)	Kelme–Ibexpress	+ 4' 50"
6	Eddy Bouwmans (NED)	Panasonic–Sportlife	+ 5' 17"
7	Andrew Hampsten (USA)	Motorola	+ 5' 24"
8	Luc Leblanc (FRA)	Castorama–Raleigh	+ 5' 35"
9	José Martín Farfán (COL)	Kelme–Ibexpress	+ 6' 13"
10	Alvaro Mejia (COL)	Postobón–Manzana–Ryalcao	+ 7' 52"
