= 1983 Tour du Haut Var =

Race details
- Dates: 27 February 1983
- Stages: 1
- Distance: 185 km (115.0 mi)
- Winning time: 5h 21' 48"

Results
	Winner	Joop Zoetemelk (NED)
	Second	Stephen Roche (IRL)
	Third	Kim Andersen (DEN)

The 1983 Tour du Haut Var was the 15th edition of the Tour du Haut Var cycle race and was held on 27 February 1983. The race started in Nice and finished in Seillans. The race was won by Joop Zoetemelk.

== General classification ==
Final general classification

Rank	Rider	Time
1	Joop Zoetemelk (NED)	5h 21' 48"
2	Stephen Roche (IRL)	+ 12"
3	Kim Andersen (DEN)	+ 38"
4	Paul Haghedooren (BEL)	+ 44"
5	Jean-Paul Le Bris (FRA)	+ 55"
6	Michel Laurent (FRA)	+ 1' 10"
7	Bernard Bourreau (FRA)	+ 1' 30"
8	Claude Criquielion (BEL)	+ 1' 40"
9	Marc Durant (FRA)	+ 1' 41"
10	Patrick Bonnet (FRA)	+ 1' 52"
