= 1982 Tour de Romandie =

Race details
- Dates: 4–9 May 1982
- Stages: 5 + Prologue
- Distance: 820.8 km (510.0 mi)
- Winning time: 21h 34' 55"

Results
	Winner	Jostein Wilmann (NOR)	(Capri Sonne–Campagnolo–Merckx)
	Second	Tommy Prim (SWE)	(Bianchi–Piaggio)
	Third	Silvano Contini (ITA)	(Bianchi–Piaggio)

The 1982 Tour de Romandie was the 36th edition of the Tour de Romandie cycle race and was held from 4 May to 9 May 1982. The race started in Meyrin and finished in Neuchâtel. The race was won by Jostein Wilmann of the Capri Sonne team.

== General classification ==
Final general classification
Rank	Rider	Team	Time
1	Jostein Wilmann (NOR)	Capri Sonne–Campagnolo–Merckx	21h 34' 55"
2	Tommy Prim (SWE)	Bianchi–Piaggio	+ 1' 03"
3	Silvano Contini (ITA)	Bianchi–Piaggio	+ 1' 33"
4	Bernard Hinault (FRA)	Renault–Elf–Gitane	+ 1' 33"
5	Jean-Marie Grezet (SUI)	Cilo–Aufina	+ 1' 34"
6	Michel Laurent (FRA)	Peugeot–Shell–Michelin	+ 2' 34"
7	Robert Millar (GBR)	Peugeot–Shell–Michelin	+ 2' 50"
8	Jérôme Simon (FRA)	La Redoute–Motobécane	+ 2' 58"
9	Robert Alban (FRA)	La Redoute–Motobécane	+ 3' 31"
10	Daniel Müller (SUI)	Royal–Wrangler	+ 3' 46"
