= Stephen Roche =

Irish cyclist (born 1959)

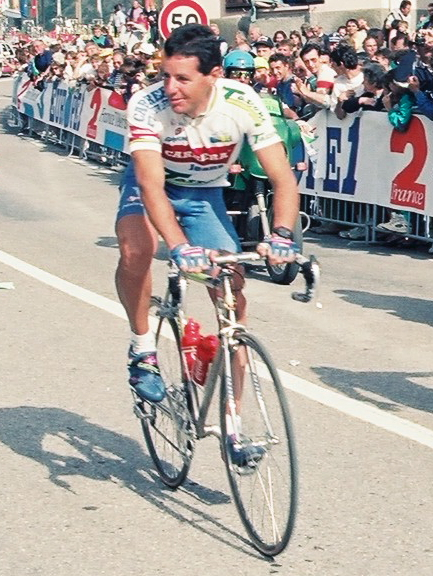
- Roche at the 1993 Tour de France

Personal information
- Full name: Stephen Roche
- Born: 28 November 1959 (age 66) Dundrum, County Dublin, Ireland
- Height: 1.75 m (5 ft 9 in)
- Weight: 74 kg (163 lb; 11 st 9 lb)

Cycling career
- Sport: Cycling
- Current team: Retired
- Discipline: Road
- Role: Rider
- Rider type: All-rounder

Amateur teams
- 1974–1979: Orwell Wheelers
- 1980: A.C.B.B.

Professional teams
- 1981–1983: Peugeot–Esso–Michelin
- 1984–1985: La Redoute
- 1986–1987: Carrera–Inoxpran
- 1988–1989: Fagor–MBK
- 1990: Histor–Sigma
- 1991: Tonton Tapis–GB
- 1992–1993: Carrera Jeans–Vagabond

Major wins
- Grand Tours Tour de France General classification (1987) 3 individual stages (1985, 1987, 1992) 1 TTT stage (1987) Giro d'Italia General classification (1987) Combination classification (1987) 2 individual stages (1987) 1 TTT stage (1987) Stage races Paris–Nice (1981) Tour de Romandie (1983, 1984, 1987) Tour of the Basque Country (1989) Critérium International (1985, 1991) One-day races and Classics World Road Race Championships (1987) Other Super Prestige Pernod International (1987)
Medal record
Representing Ireland
Men's road bicycle racing
World Championships
Gold medal – first place	1987 Villach	Elite Men's Road Race
Bronze medal – third place	1983 Altenrhein	Elite Men's Road Race

Stephen Roche (/ˈroʊtʃ/; born 28 November 1959) is an Irish former professional road racing cyclist. In a 13-year professional career, he peaked in 1987, becoming the second of only three male cyclists to win the Triple Crown of victories in the Tour de France and the Giro d'Italia general classification, plus the World road race championship, the others being Eddy Merckx and Tadej Pogačar. Roche's rise coincided with that of fellow Irishman Sean Kelly.

Although one of the finest cyclists of his generation and admired for his pedalling style, he struggled with knee injuries and never contended in the Grand Tours post-1987. He had 58 professional career wins.

== Early life and amateur career ==
On completion of his apprenticeship as a machinist in a Dublin dairy and following a successful amateur career in Ireland with the "Orwell Wheelers" club coached by Noel O'Neill of Dundrum (which included winning the Irish Junior Championship in 1977 and the Rás Tailteann in 1979), Roche joined the Athletic Club de Boulogne-Billancourt amateur team in Paris to prepare for the 1980 Olympic games in Moscow. Soon after his arrival Roche won the amateur Paris–Roubaix, escaping with Dirk Demol and sprinting to victory on the track at Roubaix. Roche was told by his directeur sportif that if he did not win he "would be sent home to Ireland that day".

He also finished on the podium at the early-season Paris–Ezy road race and finished 14th overall in the Sealink International stage race which was won by Bob Downs. However, a knee injury caused by a poorly fitted shoe plate led to a disappointing ride in Moscow, where he finished 45th. However, on return to France, August to October saw Roche win 19 races. That led to a contract with the Peugeot professional cycling team for 1981.

== Professional career ==
Roche scored his first professional victory by beating Bernard Hinault in the Tour of Corsica. Less than a month later he won Paris–Nice (where he became the first, and still the only, new pro to win Paris–Nice) despite illness following the descent from Mont Ventoux. He finished his debut season with victories in the Tour de Corse, Circuit d'Indre-et-Loire and Étoile des Espoirs races, with a second place behind Hinault in the Grand Prix des Nations. In total, his debut yielded 10 victories.

In 1982 his best performance was second in the Amstel Gold Race behind Jan Raas, but his rise continued in 1983 with victories in the Tour de Romandie, Grand Prix de Wallonie, Étoile des Espoirs and Paris–Bourges. In the 1983 Tour de France, Roche finished 13th and he finished the 1983 season with a bronze medal in the world cycling championship at Alterheim in Zurich.

In 1984, riding for La Redoute following contractual wrangles with Peugeot (the settlement of which led Roche to sport Peugeot shorts for two years before winning a court action against Vélo Club de Paris Peugeot) he repeated his Tour de Romandie win, won Nice-Alassio, Subida a Arrate and was second in Paris–Nice. He finished 25th in that year's Tour de France.

In 1985, Roche won the Critérium International, the Route du Sud and came second in Paris–Nice and third in Liège–Bastogne–Liège. In the 1985 Tour de France Roche won stage 18 to the Aubisque and finished on the podium in 3rd position, 4 minutes and 29 seconds behind the winner Bernard Hinault.

=== Chronic knee injury ===
In 1986 at a six-day event with UK professional Tony Doyle at Paris-Bercy, Roche crashed at speed and damaged his right knee. This destroyed his 1986 season at new team Carrera–Inoxpran with little to show other than second in a stage of the Giro. Roche finished the 1986 Tour de France 48th, 1h 32m behind Greg LeMond, a Tour that Roche described as like "entering a dark tunnel" of pain.

The injury and then associated back problems recurred throughout his career (for example in the 1989 Tour Roche abandoned after banging the problem knee on his handlebars) and a series of operations appeared to only address direct or consequential symptoms of the core injury. Later non-surgical intervention under Dr.Hans-Wilhelm Müller-Wohlfahrt in Munich made some difference but the injury required constant care.

By the end of his career Roche was unable to compete at his best because of a back problem which led to a loss of power in the left leg. In retirement, he described riding the 1993 Tour de France "just for fun". He finished 13th, riding for Claudio Chiappucci).

=== 1987 Triple Crown ===
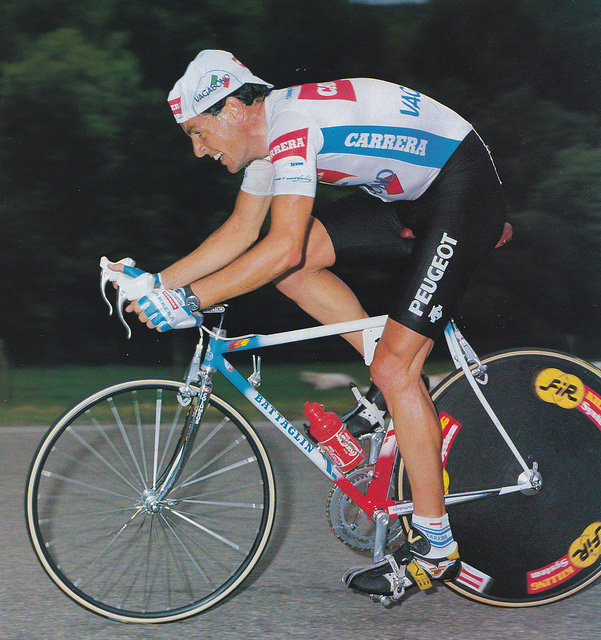
Roche riding in the final time trial at the 1987 Tour de France

In 1987, Roche had a tremendous season. In the spring, he won the Volta a la Comunitat Valenciana, taking a third victory in the Tour de Romandie and fourth place plus a stage win in Paris–Nice. He also finished second in Liège–Bastogne–Liège, the closest he got to winning a professional 'Monument' Classic. He blamed it on tactical naiveté and "riding like an amateur".

In the Giro d'Italia, Roche took three stage wins (including a team win with Carrera Jeans–Vagabond in the team time trial) en route to overall victory and became the first Giro victor from outside mainland Europe. Roche's stage wins that year in the Giro were stage 1b, the 8 km (5.0 mi) time trial downhill on the Poggio into San Remo and stage 22, a 32 km (20 mi) individual time trial into St. Vincent. Despite his stage wins, the race is remembered for the stage from Lido di Jesolo to Sappada, where Roche, contravening team orders, broke away alone early and despite being caught late in the race, had the strength to go with the counterattack and take the pink jersey from his teammate Roberto Visentini, who had been previously leading the classification. His behaviour in the stage gained him the tifosi's hatred. It was said the only member of his team that Roche could rely on not to ride against him was his domestique Eddy Schepers, although Roche recruited Panasonic riders and old ACBB teammates Robert Millar and Australian Phil Anderson to protect him with Schepers on the Marmolada climb (a day known as the "Marmolada Massacre").

Roche finished the Giro exhausted but favourite for the Tour de France. Following Bernard Hinault's retirement, Laurent Fignon's choppy form and with Greg LeMond injured following an accidental shooting while hunting, the 1987 Tour was open. It was also one of the most mountainous since the war, with 25 stages. Roche won the 87.5 km (54.4 mi) individual time trial stage 10 to Futuroscope and came second on stage 19.

On stage 21, crossing the Galibier and Madeleine and finishing at La Plagne, Roche attacked early, was away for several hours but was caught on the last climb. His nearest rival Pedro Delgado then attacked. Despite being almost one-and-a-half minutes in arrears midway up the last climb, Roche pulled the deficit back to 4 seconds. Roche collapsed and lost consciousness and was given oxygen. When asked when revived if he was okay, he replied "Oui, mais pas de femme toute de suite" ("yes, but I am not ready for a woman straight away").

The yellow jersey (worn by the leader of the general classification) changed hands several times with Charly Mottet, Roche, Jean François Bernard and Delgado all wearing it before Roche used the final 35 km (22 mi) time trial to overturn a half-minute gap and win the Tour by 40 seconds, which was at the time the second-narrowest margin (in 1968 Jan Janssen had beaten Herman Van Springel by 38 seconds; two years after Roche's victory, Greg LeMond beat Laurent Fignon by 8 seconds). Roche became only the fifth cyclist in history to win the Tour and the Giro in the same year. He was the second Irish person to win the Tour de France, following in the tyre tracks of Millie Robinson, who won the Tour de France Féminin in 1955, but remains the only Irishman to win the Tour de France. Irish Taoiseach Charles Haughey joined Roche on the podium on the Champs-Élysées.

Later that year, with victory at the World road race championship in Villach in Austria, Roche became only the second to win the Triple Crown of Cycling. Roche arrived with insufficient training although he worked during the 23-lap, 278 km (173 mi) undulating terrain for his teammate Sean Kelly and escaped in the race-winning break only while covering for his countryman. With Moreno Argentin in the following group, Kelly did not chase and as the break slowed and jostling for position began for a sprint, Roche attacked 500 m (1,600 ft) from the finish and crossed the line with metres to spare.

Victory in the season-long Super Prestige Pernod International competition was assured.

Roche was given the freedom of Dublin in late September 1987. Several days later the 1987 edition of the Nissan Classic began and Roche rode strongly to finish second behind Kelly.

=== Post-1987 career ===
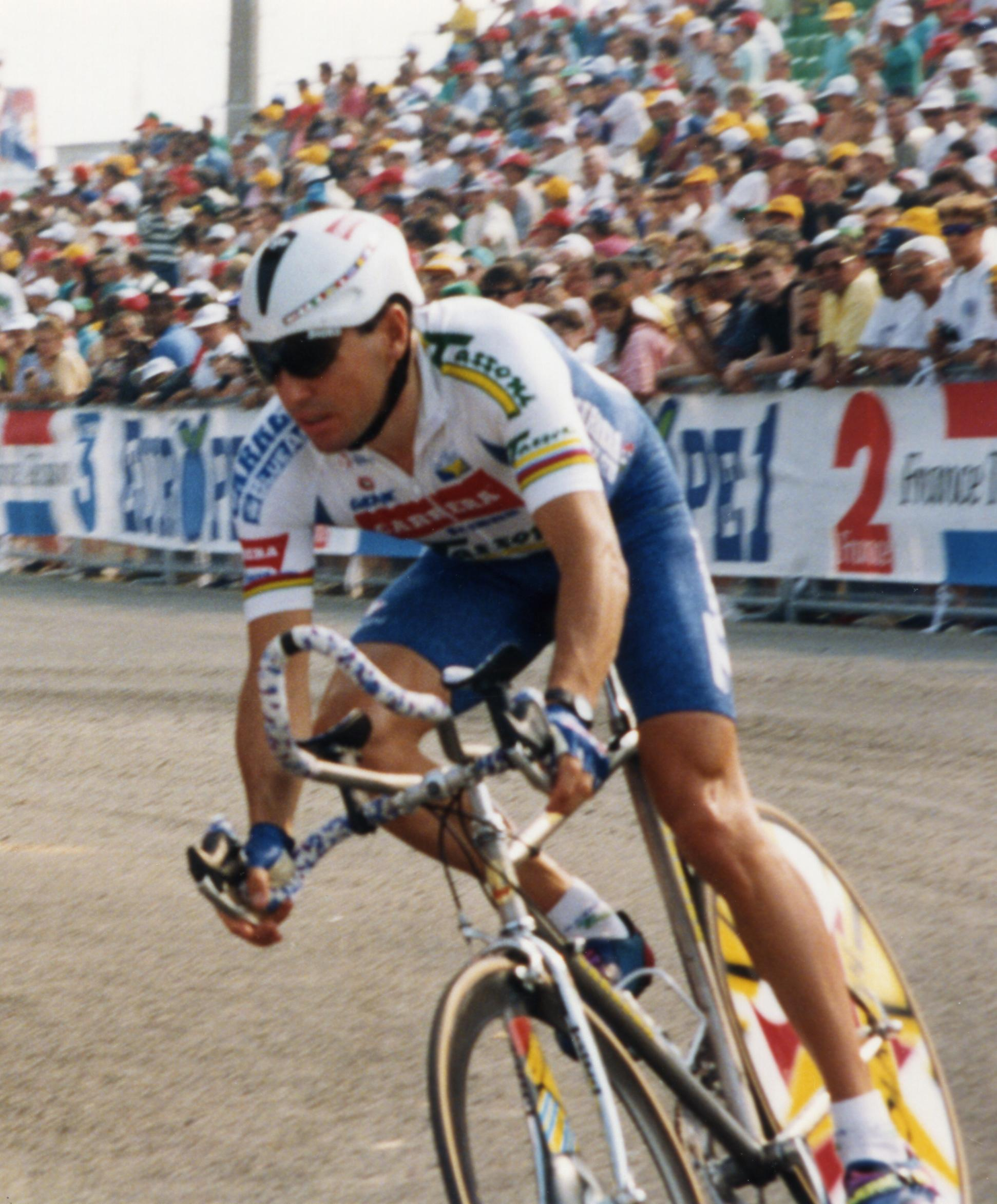
Roche riding an individual time trial at the 1993 Tour de France

At the close of 1987, Roche moved to Fagor MBK, bringing English riders Sean Yates and Malcolm Elliot, 1984 Tour de France King of the Mountains winner Robert Millar and domestique Eddy Schepers. The team was criticised for containing too many English speakers.

The 1988 season began badly with a recurrence of the knee injury and Roche began a gradual decline. In 1989 he again took second in Paris–Nice (making four second places) and the Setmana Catalana de Ciclisme. Roche finished the 1989 Giro d'Italia ninth behind Laurent Fignon. During the 1989 Tour de France, Roche withdrew due to his knee.

There were problems with his team and he changed again. In 1990, racing for Histor–Sigma, he won the Four Days of Dunkirk and in 1991 riding for Roger De Vlaeminck's Tonton Tapis–GB brought victories in the Setmana Catalana de Ciclisme and Critérium International. In the 1991 Tour de France, Roche missed the start for his team's Team time trial and was forced to withdraw due to controversially missing the time cut.

In the Grand Tours, he was ninth in the 1989 Giro, and won a stage of the 1992 Tour de France in appalling conditions into La Bourboule (again racing for Carrera Jeans–Vagabond but now in support of Claudio Chiappucci) and en route to a final ninth place. Riding the last edition of the Nissan Classic Tour of Ireland, Roche was in many breaks but finished fifth. A year later, he was again ninth in the 1993 Giro d'Italia and 13th in the 1993 Tour de France.

Roche retired at the end of an anonymous 1993 which yielded a single win, in the post-Tour de France criterium at Chateau Chinon.

== Doping ==
"I have never taken performance-enhancing drugs whether banned or unbanned, on or off the list, at any time. In fact, I underwent hundreds of tests during my career and all were negative."

— Stephen Roche

In May 1990, Paul Kimmage – a former professional and teammate of Roche at Fagor, as well as a fellow Dubliner – published an account of life in the peloton. His book Rough Ride exposed drug use apparently endemic in the peloton but spoke in fawning terms about Roche. Despite this, the publication resulted in a threat of litigation from Roche.

It was reported in the Rome newspaper, La Repubblica, in January 2000 that Francesco Conconi, a professor at the University of Ferrara involved with administering erythropoietin (EPO) to riders on the Carrera team with which Roche had some of his best years, had provided riders including Roche with EPO. Roche denied the allegations. This was further reported in The Irish Times several days later, Roche again denying EPO. In March 2000 the Italian judge Franca Oliva published a report detailing the investigation into sports doctors including Conconi. This official judicial investigation unequivocally found that Roche was administered EPO in 1993, his last year in the peloton. Files from part of the investigation allegedly detail a number of aliases for Roche including Rocchi, Rossi, Rocca, Roncati, Righi and Rossini. In 2004 Judge Oliva again alleged that Roche had taken EPO during 1993 but due to the statute of limitations, neither Roche nor his teammates at Carrera would be prosecuted.

== Personal life ==
Roche lives in Antibes on the Côte d'Azur. Roche remained involved in the sport by founding cycling camps in Mallorca, taking part in race organisations and working as a commentator on cycling events for Eurosport.

He has four children with his former wife Lydia; the couple divorced in 2004. One son, Nicolas Roche, was a professional until his retirement in 2021, and was the 2009 and 2016 Irish National Road Race Champion.

Stephen's brother Lawrence Roche was also a professional cyclist who completed his only Tour de France in 1991. They were teammates on the Tonton Tapis–GB team.

Roche's nephew Dan Martin was also a professional cyclist and was the 2008 Irish National Road Race Champion.

Roche completed the 2008 New York Marathon in a time of 4:21:09.

In April 2022 a Spanish court found Roche guilty of fraud and ordered him to repay €733,866 to creditors of his bankrupt cycling holiday company in Mallorca. The court determined he had funded his lifestyle with the company's assets instead of paying back creditors.

== Career achievements ==
=== Major results ===
1977
1st Road race, National Junior Road Championships
1979
1st National Cyclo-Cross Championships
1st Overall Rás Tailteann

1st Stages 2 & 9a

1980
1st Paris–Roubaix Espoirs
2nd Road race, National Amateur Road Championships
2nd Grand Prix des Nations Amateurs
1981
1st Overall Paris–Nice

1st Stage 7b (ITT)

1st Overall Étoile des Espoirs

1st Prologue & Stage 4b (ITT)

1st Overall Tour d'Indre-et-Loire

1st Stage 3

2nd Grand Prix des Nations
2nd Grand Prix de Monaco
3rd Critérium des As
3rd Grand Prix de Cannes
4th Overall Critérium International
4th Overall Four Days of Dunkirk
5th Overall Tour Méditerranéen
6th Overall Tour de l'Avenir

1st Stage 7 (ITT)

1982
2nd Amstel Gold Race
3rd Overall Four Days of Dunkirk
3rd Trofeo Baracchi (with Jacques Bossis)
4th Overall Tour Midi-Pyrénées
5th Overall Étoile des Espoirs
6th Overall Paris–Nice
9th Liège–Bastogne–Liège
9th Tour du Haut Var
1983
1st Overall Tour de Romandie
1st Overall Étoile des Espoirs
1st Paris–Bourges
1st Grand Prix de Wallonie
2nd Tour du Haut Var
3rd Road race, UCI Road World Championships
3rd Overall Tour Midi-Pyrénées
3rd GP Ouest–France
4th Overall Tour Méditerranéen
5th Overall Grand Prix du Midi Libre
5th Overall Critérium International
5th Grand Prix des Nations
7th Clásica de San Sebastián
7th Paris–Tours
1984
1st Overall Tour de Romandie
1st Subida a Arrate
1st Nice–Alassio
2nd Overall Paris–Nice

1st Stage 6

2nd Overall Tour Méditerranéen
2nd Overall Tour de l'Oise
3rd Overall Critérium International
3rd Grand Prix des Nations
5th Giro di Lombardia
6th Overall Critérium du Dauphiné Libéré

1st Points classification

6th Kuurne–Brussels–Kuurne
7th Critérium des As
1985
1st Overall Critérium International

1st Stage 3 (ITT)

1st Overall Tour Midi-Pyrénées

1st Stage 1a

Critérium du Dauphiné Libéré

1st Prologue & Stage 9 (ITT)

2nd Overall Paris–Nice

1st Stage 7b (ITT)

3rd Overall Tour de France

1st Stage 18a

3rd Overall Tour Méditerranéen
3rd Liège–Bastogne–Liège
4th Grand Prix de Cannes
5th Tour du Haut Var
5th Grand Prix Eddy Merckx
7th Road race, UCI Road World Championships
7th Overall Grand Prix du Midi Libre
10th Overall Tour of Ireland

1st Stages 3b & 4a

1986
7th Trofeo Baracchi (with Roberto Visentini)
1987
1st Road race, UCI Road World Championships
1st Overall Tour de France

1st Stages 2 (TTT) & 10 (ITT)
Held after Stages 22 & 24

1st Overall Giro d'Italia

1st Combination classification
1st Stages 1b (ITT), 3 (TTT) & 22 (ITT)
Held after Stages 4–6

1st Overall Tour de Romandie

1st Stages 5a & 5b (ITT)

1st Overall Volta a la Comunitat Valenciana

1st Stage 4 (ITT)

1st Overall Super Prestige Pernod International
2nd Overall Critérium International
2nd Overall Tour of Ireland
2nd Liège–Bastogne–Liège
4th Overall Paris–Nice

1st Stages 1 (TTT) & 7b (ITT)

4th La Flèche Wallonne
4th Rund um den Henninger-Turm
5th Trofeo Pantalica
1988
6th Overall Tour of Britain
8th Overall Tour of Ireland
1989
1st Overall Tour of the Basque Country

1st Stage 5b (ITT)

2nd Overall Paris–Nice

1st Stage 7b (ITT)

3rd Overall Four Days of Dunkirk

1st Stage 3a (ITT)

3rd Overall Critérium International
9th Overall Giro d'Italia
1990
1st Overall Four Days of Dunkirk
2nd Overall Paris–Nice
5th Overall Grand Prix du Midi Libre
6th Overall Tour of the Basque Country
6th Overall Critérium International
6th La Flèche Wallonne
7th Overall Critérium du Dauphiné Libéré
1991
1st Overall Critérium International
1st Overall Setmana Catalana de Ciclisme
4th Overall Paris–Nice
7th Overall Tour of the Basque Country
7th Grand Prix d'Isbergues
8th Liège–Bastogne–Liège
9th Subida a Urkiola
1992
2nd Gran Piemonte
5th Overall Tour of Ireland
6th Overall Tour of the Basque Country
7th Overall Critérium International
7th Overall Setmana Catalana de Ciclisme
8th Overall Tirreno–Adriatico
9th Overall Tour de France

1st Stage 16

1993
9th Overall Giro d'Italia
9th Giro di Toscana

==== General classification results timeline ====
Grand Tour general classification results
Grand Tour	1981	1982	1983	1984	1985	1986	1987	1988	1989	1990	1991	1992	1993
Vuelta a España	—	—	—	—	—	—	—	—	—	—	—	14	—
Giro d'Italia	—	—	—	—	—	DNF	1	—	9	—	—	—	9
Tour de France	—	—	13	25	3	48	1	—	DNF	44	DNF	9	13
Major stage race general classification results
Race	1981	1982	1983	1984	1985	1986	1987	1988	1989	1990	1991	1992	1993
Paris–Nice	1	6	—	2	2	—	4	—	2	2	4	—	—
Tirreno–Adriatico	—	—	—	—	—	—	—	—	—	—	—	8	21
Tour of the Basque Country	—	—	—	—	—	—	12	—	1	6	7	6	22
Tour de Romandie	—	—	1	1	—	—	1	—	—	—	—	—	13
Critérium du Dauphiné	26	—	—	6	—	—	—	—	—	7	—	—	—
Tour de Suisse	—	—	—	—	—	—	—	—	—	—	—	DNF	—
Volta a Catalunya	Did not contest during his career												

Legend
—	Did not compete
DNF	Did not finish
