= Michel Laurent =

French cyclist

Personal information
- Full name: Michel Laurent
- Born: 10 August 1953 (age 73) Bourbon-Lancy, France

Cycling career
- Sport: Cycling
- Current team: Retired
- Discipline: Road
- Role: Rider

Professional teams
- 1976: Miko-de Gribaldy-Superia
- 1977–1981: Peugeot-Esso-Michelin
- 1982: Peugeot-Esso-Michelin
- 1983: Peugeot-Shell-Michelin
- 1984: Coop-Mercier
- Coop-Hoonved

Major wins
- Grand Tours Tour de France 1 individual stages (1983) Stage races Paris–Nice (1976) Critérium du Dauphiné Libéré (1982) One-day races and Classics La Flèche Wallonne (1978)

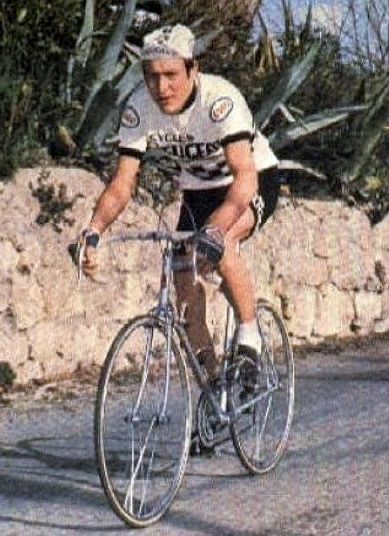
Laurent in 1977

Michel Laurent (born 10 August 1953) is a French former professional road racing cyclist.

== Major results ==
1975
1st Grand Prix de la Liberté Fribourg
1976
1st Overall Paris–Nice
Commentry
Promotion Pernod
Tour de Corse
Vernon
1977
Le Creusot
Chateau-Chinon
7th Overall Tour de France
1978
1st La Flèche Wallonne
1st Critérium des As
Niort
Orchies
Tour de Corse
1979
Vailly-sur-Sauldre
Tour Méditerranéen
GP Lugano
1980
1st Overall Critérium International
1981
Bain-de-Bretagne
4th Overall Tour de Romandie
7th Overall Critérium du Dauphiné Libéré
1982
1st Overall Critérium du Dauphiné Libéré
1st Overall Tour Méditerranéen
1st Maël-Pestivien
3rd Overall Tour Midi-Pyrénées
4th Overall Grand Prix du Midi Libre
4th Overall Tour de Corse
6th Overall Tour de Romandie
9th Overall Paris–Nice
1983
1st Stage 16 Tour de France
1st Stage 4 Grand Prix du Midi Libre
2nd Overall Tour du Sud-Est

1st Stage 1

5th Overall Paris–Nice
6th Overall Critérium International
6th Overall Tour Méditerranéen
6th Tour du Haut Var
7th Grand Prix de Plumelec
10th Overall Tour de Romandie
1984
2nd Overall Tour Midi-Pyrénées
4th Overall Paris–Nice
8th Overall Critérium du Dauphiné Libéré

1st Stage 4

9th Overall Grand Prix du Midi Libre
