= Remig Stumpf =

German cyclist

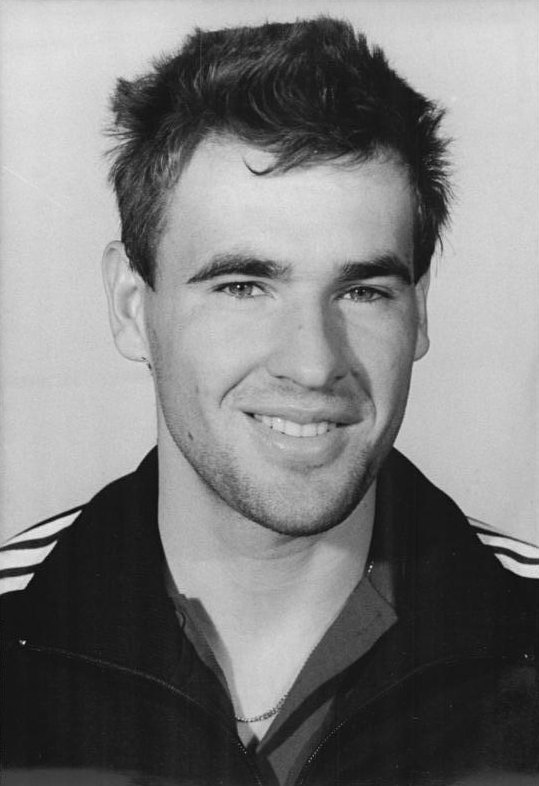
- Remig Stumpf in 1987

Personal information
- Born: 25 March 1966 Schweinfurt, West Germany
- Died: 14 May 2019 (aged 53) Bergrheinfeld, Germany
- Height: 1.93 m (6 ft 4 in)
- Weight: 88 kg (194 lb)

Sport
- Sport: Cycling
- Club: RSG Nürnberg

Remig Stumpf (25 March 1966 – 14 May 2019) was a German cyclist. He competed at the 1988 Summer Olympics in the 100 km team time trial and in the individual road race and finished in sixth and 14th place, respectively. He won the Tour of Berlin, Rund um Köln and Rund um Düren in 1986. In 1989 he finished third in the Kellogg's Tour of Britain. He won the six-day race of Cologne in 1992 and 1993.

Stumpf struggled to adjust to post-Olympic life. He killed his ex-wife Mirjam and committed suicide on 14 May 2019 in his home at Bergrheinfeld.
