= 1974 Tour de France, Stage 12 to Stage 22 =

Cycling race stages

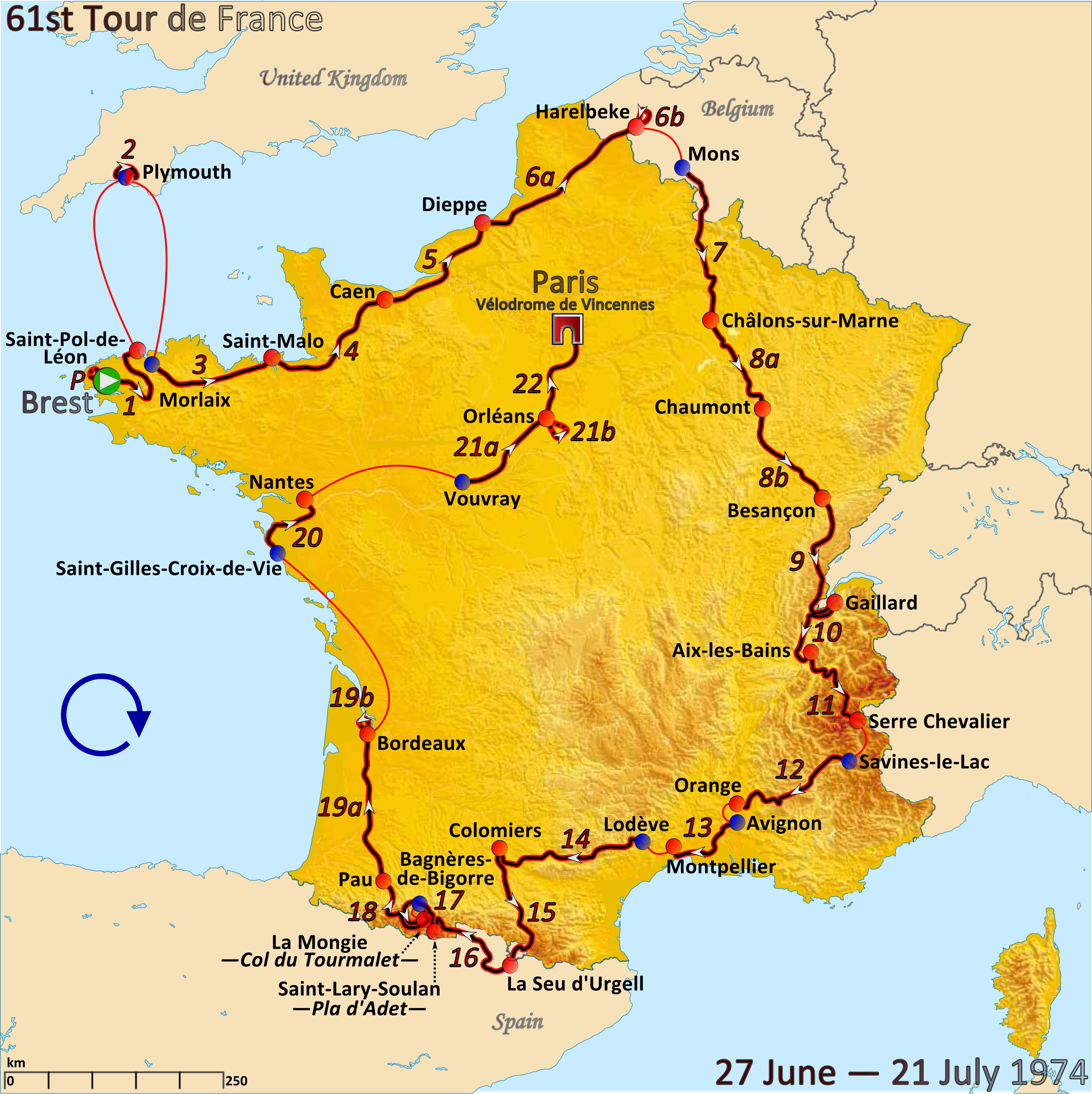
Route of the 1974 Tour de France

The 1974 Tour de France was the 61st edition of Tour de France, one of cycling's Grand Tours. The Tour began in Brest with a prologue individual time trial on 27 June and Stage 12 occurred on 10 July with a mountainous stage from Savines-le-Lac. The race finished in Paris on 21 July.

== Stage 12 ==
10 July 1974 - Savines-le-Lac to Orange, 231 km (143.5 mi)

Stage 12 result

Rank	Rider	Team	Time
1	Jozef Spruyt (BEL)	Molteni	7h 15' 12"
2	Fedor den Hertog (BEL)	Frisol–Flair Plastics	s.t.
3	Edward Janssens (BEL)	Molteni	s.t.
4	Raymond Riotte (FRA)	Peugeot–BP–Michelin	s.t.
5	Francisco Galdós (ESP)	Kas–Kaskol	s.t.
6	Jacques Esclassan (FRA)	Peugeot–BP–Michelin	+ 41"
7	Cyrille Guimard (FRA)	Flandria–Shimano–Merlin Plage	s.t.
8	Staf Van Roosbroeck (BEL)	MIC–Ludo–de Gribaldy	s.t.
9	Barry Hoban (GBR)	Gan–Mercier–Hutchinson	s.t.
10	Gerben Karstens (NED)	Bic	s.t.

General classification after stage 12

Rank	Rider	Team	Time
1	Eddy Merckx (BEL)	Molteni	67h 33' 04"
2	Gonzalo Aja (ESP)	Kas–Kaskol	+ 2' 01"
3	Vicente López Carril (ESP)	Kas–Kaskol	+ 3' 13"
4	Wladimiro Panizza (ITA)	Brooklyn	+ 5' 20"
5	Joaquim Agostinho (POR)	Bic	+ 5' 55"
6	Francisco Galdós (ESP)	Kas–Kaskol	+ 6' 57"
7	Raymond Poulidor (FRA)	Gan–Mercier–Hutchinson	+ 7' 30"
8	Alain Santy (FRA)	Gan–Mercier–Hutchinson	+ 8' 45"
9	Mariano Martínez (FRA)	Sonolor–Gitane	+ 11' 29"
10	Herman Van Springel (BEL)	MIC–Ludo–de Gribaldy	+ 11' 42"

== Stage 13 ==
11 July 1974 - Avignon to Montpellier, 126 km (78 mi)

Stage 13 result

Rank	Rider	Team	Time
1	Barry Hoban (GBR)	Gan–Mercier–Hutchinson	3h 15' 42"
2	Jacques Esclassan (FRA)	Peugeot–BP–Michelin	s.t.
3	Patrick Sercu (BEL)	Brooklyn	s.t.
4	Staf Van Roosbroeck (BEL)	MIC–Ludo–de Gribaldy	s.t.
5	Gerben Karstens (NED)	Bic	s.t.
6	Domingo Perurena (ESP)	Kas–Kaskol	s.t.
7	Piet van Katwijk (NED)	Frisol–Flair Plastics	s.t.
8	Robert Mintkiewicz (FRA)	Sonolor–Gitane	s.t.
9	Marc Demeyer (BEL)	Carpenter–Confortluxe–Flandria	s.t.
10	Jack Mourioux (FRA)	Gan–Mercier–Hutchinson	s.t.

General classification after stage 13

Rank	Rider	Team	Time
1	Eddy Merckx (BEL)	Molteni	70h 48' 46"
2	Gonzalo Aja (ESP)	Kas–Kaskol	+ 2' 01"
3	Vicente López Carril (ESP)	Kas–Kaskol	+ 3' 13"
4	Wladimiro Panizza (ITA)	Brooklyn	+ 5' 20"
5	Joaquim Agostinho (POR)	Bic	+ 5' 55"
6	Francisco Galdós (ESP)	Kas–Kaskol	+ 6'57"
7	Raymond Poulidor (FRA)	Gan–Mercier–Hutchinson	+ 7' 30"
8	Alain Santy (FRA)	Gan–Mercier–Hutchinson	+ 10' 07"
9	Mariano Martínez (FRA)	Sonolor–Gitane	+ 11' 29"
10	Herman Van Springel (BEL)	MIC–Ludo–de Gribaldy	+ 11' 42"

== Stage 14 ==
12 July 1974 - Lodève to Colomiers, 249 km (155 mi)

Stage 14 result

Rank	Rider	Team	Time
1	Jean-Pierre Genet (FRA)	Gan–Mercier–Hutchinson	7h 12' 50"
2	Ludo Delcroix (BEL)	Molteni	+ 20"
3	Gianni Di Lorenzo (ITA)	Brooklyn	s.t.
4	Antonio Martos (ESP)	Kas–Kaskol	s.t.
5	Marc Demeyer (BEL)	Carpenter–Confortluxe–Flandria	+ 26"
6	Dirk Baert (BEL)	MIC–Ludo–de Gribaldy	s.t.
7	André Dierickx (BEL)	Flandria–Shimano–Merlin Plage	s.t.
8	Jean-Luc Molinéris (FRA)	Bic	s.t.
9	Juan Zurano (ESP)	La Casera–Bahamontes	s.t.
10	Jacques Botherel (FRA)	Sonolor–Gitane	s.t.

General classification after stage 14

Rank	Rider	Team	Time
1	Eddy Merckx (BEL)	Molteni	78h 02' 43"
2	Gonzalo Aja (ESP)	Kas–Kaskol	+ 2' 05"
3	Vicente López Carril (ESP)	Kas–Kaskol	+ 3' 20"
4	Wladimiro Panizza (ITA)	Brooklyn	+ 5' 24"
5	Joaquim Agostinho (POR)	Bic	+ 5' 59"
6	Francisco Galdós (ESP)	Kas–Kaskol	+ 7' 01"
7	Raymond Poulidor (FRA)	Gan–Mercier–Hutchinson	+ 7' 37"
8	Alain Santy (FRA)	Gan–Mercier–Hutchinson	+ 10' 14"
9	Mariano Martínez (FRA)	Sonolor–Gitane	+ 11' 33"
10	Herman Van Springel (BEL)	MIC–Ludo–de Gribaldy	+ 11' 49"

== Rest Day 2 ==
13 July 1974 - Colomiers

== Stage 15 ==
14 July 1974 - Colomiers to La Seu d'Urgell, 225 km (140 mi)

Stage 15 result

Rank	Rider	Team	Time
1	Eddy Merckx (BEL)	Molteni	6h 42' 29"
2	Mariano Martínez (FRA)	Sonolor–Gitane	s.t.
3	Michel Pollentier (BEL)	Carpenter–Confortluxe–Flandria	s.t.
4	Wladimiro Panizza (ITA)	Brooklyn	s.t.
5	Vicente López Carril (ESP)	Kas–Kaskol	s.t.
6	Gonzalo Aja (ESP)	Kas–Kaskol	s.t.
7	Lucien Van Impe (BEL)	Sonolor–Gitane	s.t.
8	Valerio Lualdi (ITA)	Brooklyn	s.t.
9	Raymond Delisle (FRA)	Peugeot–BP–Michelin	s.t.
10	Joaquim Agostinho (POR)	Bic	s.t.

General classification after stage 15

Rank	Rider	Team	Time
1	Eddy Merckx (BEL)	Molteni	84h 45' 12"
2	Gonzalo Aja (ESP)	Kas–Kaskol	+ 2' 05"
3	Vicente López Carril (ESP)	Kas–Kaskol	+ 3' 20"
4	Wladimiro Panizza (ITA)	Brooklyn	+ 5' 24"
5	Joaquim Agostinho (POR)	Bic	+ 5' 59"
6	Francisco Galdós (ESP)	Kas–Kaskol	+ 7' 01"
7	Raymond Poulidor (FRA)	Gan–Mercier–Hutchinson	+ 7' 37"
8	Mariano Martínez (FRA)	Sonolor–Gitane	+ 11' 33"
9	Herman Van Springel (BEL)	MIC–Ludo–de Gribaldy	+ 11' 49"
10	Michel Pollentier (BEL)	Carpenter–Confortluxe–Flandria	+ 14' 32"

== Stage 16 ==
15 July 1974 - La Seu d'Urgell to Saint-Lary-Soulan Pla d'Adet, 209 km (130 mi)

Stage 16 result

Rank	Rider	Team	Time
1	Raymond Poulidor (FRA)	Gan–Mercier–Hutchinson	7h 53' 29"
2	Vicente López Carril (ESP)	Kas–Kaskol	+ 41"
3	Michel Pollentier (BEL)	Carpenter–Confortluxe–Flandria	+ 1' 02"
4	Alain Santy (FRA)	Gan–Mercier–Hutchinson	+ 1 17"
5	Eddy Merckx (BEL)	Molteni	+ 1' 49"
6	Wladimiro Panizza (ITA)	Brooklyn	+ 2 05"
7	Roger Pingeon (FRA)	Jobo–Lejeune	+ 2' 34"
8	André Romero (FRA)	Jobo–Lejeune	+ 3' 31"
9	Michel Périn (FRA)	Gan–Mercier–Hutchinson	+ 3' 45"
10	Willy Van Neste (BEL)	Sonolor–Gitane	+ 3' 48"

General classification after stage 16

Rank	Rider	Team	Time
1	Eddy Merckx (BEL)	Molteni	92h 40' 18"
2	Vicente López Carril (ESP)	Kas–Kaskol	+ 2' 24"
3	Gonzalo Aja (ESP)	Kas–Kaskol	+ 4' 20"
4	Wladimiro Panizza (ITA)	Brooklyn	+ 5' 58"
5	Raymond Poulidor (FRA)	Gan–Mercier–Hutchinson	+ 6' 00"
6	Joaquim Agostinho (POR)	Bic	+ 10' 54"
7	Michel Pollentier (BEL)	Carpenter–Confortluxe–Flandria	+ 13' 53"
8	Mariano Martínez (FRA)	Sonolor–Gitane	+ 14' 16"
9	Alain Santy (FRA)	Gan–Mercier–Hutchinson	+ 15' 07"
10	Herman Van Springel (BEL)	MIC–Ludo–de Gribaldy	+ 18' 08"

== Stage 17 ==
16 July 1974 - Saint-Lary-Soulan to La Mongie, 119 km (74 mi)

Stage 17 result

Rank	Rider	Team	Time
1	Jean-Pierre Danguillaume (FRA)	Peugeot–BP–Michelin	3h 58' 44"
2	Raymond Poulidor (FRA)	Gan–Mercier–Hutchinson	+ 2' 26"
3	Mariano Martínez (FRA)	Sonolor–Gitane	+ 2' 32"
4	Alain Santy (FRA)	Gan–Mercier–Hutchinson	+ 2' 33"
5	Wladimiro Panizza (ITA)	Brooklyn	+ 2' 49"
6	Lucien Van Impe (BEL)	Sonolor–Gitane	+ 2' 51"
7	Eddy Merckx (BEL)	Molteni	+ 3' 08"
8	Vicente López Carril (ESP)	Kas–Kaskol	+ 3' 09"
9	Raymond Delisle (FRA)	Peugeot–BP–Michelin	+ 3' 25"
10	Joaquim Agostinho (POR)	Bic	+ 3' 38"

General classification after stage 17

Rank	Rider	Team	Time
1	Eddy Merckx (BEL)	Molteni	96h 42' 10"
2	Vicente López Carril (ESP)	Kas–Kaskol	+ 2' 25"
3	Raymond Poulidor (FRA)	Gan–Mercier–Hutchinson	+ 5' 18"
4	Wladimiro Panizza (ITA)	Brooklyn	+ 5' 39"
5	Gonzalo Aja (ESP)	Kas–Kaskol	+ 6' 01"
6	Joaquim Agostinho (POR)	Bic	+ 11' 24"
7	Mariano Martínez (FRA)	Sonolor–Gitane	+ 13' 40"
8	Alain Santy (FRA)	Gan–Mercier–Hutchinson	+ 14' 32"
9	Michel Pollentier (BEL)	Carpenter–Confortluxe–Flandria	+ 14' 39"
10	Herman Van Springel (BEL)	MIC–Ludo–de Gribaldy	+ 18' 56"

== Stage 18 ==
17 July 1974 - Bagnères-de-Bigorre to Pau, 141 km (88 mi)

Stage 18 result

Rank	Rider	Team	Time
1	Jean-Pierre Danguillaume (FRA)	Peugeot–BP–Michelin	4h 19' 20"
2	Ronald De Witte (BEL)	Carpenter–Confortluxe–Flandria	s.t.
3	Andrés Oliva (ESP)	La Casera–Bahamontes	s.t.
4	Juan Zurano (ESP)	La Casera–Bahamontes	s.t.
5	Barry Hoban (GBR)	Gan–Mercier–Hutchinson	+ 3' 14"
6	Charles Rouxel (FRA)	Peugeot–BP–Michelin	s.t.
7	Herman Van Springel (BEL)	MIC–Ludo–de Gribaldy	s.t.
8	Willy Teirlinck (BEL)	Sonolor–Gitane	s.t.
9	Wilfried Wesemael (BEL)	MIC–Ludo–de Gribaldy	s.t.
10	Régis Ovion (FRA)	Peugeot–BP–Michelin	s.t.

General classification after stage 18

Rank	Rider	Team	Time
1	Eddy Merckx (BEL)	Molteni	101h 04' 44"
2	Vicente López Carril (ESP)	Kas–Kaskol	+ 2' 25"
3	Raymond Poulidor (FRA)	Gan–Mercier–Hutchinson	+ 5' 18"
4	Wladimiro Panizza (ITA)	Brooklyn	+ 5' 39"
5	Gonzalo Aja (ESP)	Kas–Kaskol	+ 6' 01"
6	Joaquim Agostinho (POR)	Bic	+ 11' 24"
7	Mariano Martínez (FRA)	Sonolor–Gitane	+ 13' 40"
8	Alain Santy (FRA)	Gan–Mercier–Hutchinson	+ 14' 32"
9	Michel Pollentier (BEL)	Carpenter–Confortluxe–Flandria	+ 14' 39"
10	Herman Van Springel (BEL)	MIC–Ludo–de Gribaldy	+ 18' 56"

== Stage 19a ==
18 July 1974 - Pau to Bordeaux, 196 km (122 mi)

Stage 19a result

Rank	Rider	Team	Time
1	Francis Campaner (FRA)	Jobo–Lejeune	4h 51' 56"
2	Patrick Sercu (BEL)	Brooklyn	s.t.
3	Barry Hoban (GBR)	Gan–Mercier–Hutchinson	s.t.
4	Cyrille Guimard (FRA)	Flandria–Shimano–Merlin Plage	s.t.
5	Gerben Karstens (NED)	Bic	s.t.
6	Piet van Katwijk (NED)	Frisol–Flair Plastics	s.t.
7	Eddy Merckx (BEL)	Molteni	s.t.
8	Charles Rouxel (FRA)	Peugeot–BP–Michelin	s.t.
9	Gerard Vianen (NED)	Gan–Mercier–Hutchinson	s.t.
10	Dirk Baert (BEL)	MIC–Ludo–de Gribaldy	s.t.

General classification after stage 19a

Rank	Rider	Team	Time
1	Eddy Merckx (BEL)	Molteni	106h 10' 37"
2	Vicente López Carril (ESP)	Kas–Kaskol	+ 2' 29"
3	Raymond Poulidor (FRA)	Gan–Mercier–Hutchinson	+ 5' 22"
4	Wladimiro Panizza (ITA)	Brooklyn	+ 5' 43"
5	Gonzalo Aja (ESP)	Kas–Kaskol	+ 6' 05"
6	Joaquim Agostinho (POR)	Bic	+ 11' 28"
7	Mariano Martínez (FRA)	Sonolor–Gitane	+ 13' 42"
8	Alain Santy (FRA)	Gan–Mercier–Hutchinson	+ 14' 36"
9	Michel Pollentier (BEL)	Carpenter–Confortluxe–Flandria	+ 14' 43"
10	Herman Van Springel (BEL)	MIC–Ludo–de Gribaldy	+ 19' 00"

== Stage 19b ==
18 July 1974 - Bordeaux, 12 km (7.5 mi) (ITT)

Stage 19b result

Rank	Rider	Team	Time
1	Eddy Merckx (BEL)	Molteni	16' 15"
2	Michel Pollentier (BEL)	Carpenter–Confortluxe–Flandria	+ 2"
3	Gerrie Knetemann (NED)	Gan–Mercier–Hutchinson	+ 13"
4	Gerard Vianen (NED)	Gan–Mercier–Hutchinson	+ 18"
5	Raymond Poulidor (FRA)	Gan–Mercier–Hutchinson	+ 20"
6	Joaquim Agostinho (POR)	Bic	+ 21"
7	Joseph Bruyère (BEL)	Molteni	+ 24"
8	José Pesarrodona (ESP)	Kas–Kaskol	+ 26"
9	Dirk Baert (BEL)	MIC–Ludo–de Gribaldy	s.t.
10	Wilfried Wesemael (BEL)	MIC–Ludo–de Gribaldy	+ 29"

General classification after stage 19b

Rank	Rider	Team	Time
1	Eddy Merckx (BEL)	Molteni	106h 26' 52"
2	Vicente López Carril (ESP)	Kas–Kaskol	+ 3' 26"
3	Raymond Poulidor (FRA)	Gan–Mercier–Hutchinson	+ 5' 42"
4	Wladimiro Panizza (ITA)	Brooklyn	+ 6' 40"
5	Gonzalo Aja (ESP)	Kas–Kaskol	+ 6' 57"
6	Joaquim Agostinho (POR)	Bic	+ 11' 49"
7	Mariano Martínez (FRA)	Sonolor–Gitane	+ 14' 32"
8	Michel Pollentier (BEL)	Carpenter–Confortluxe–Flandria	+ 14' 45"
9	Alain Santy (FRA)	Gan–Mercier–Hutchinson	+ 15' 51"
10	Herman Van Springel (BEL)	MIC–Ludo–de Gribaldy	+ 19' 59"

== Stage 20 ==
19 July 1974 - Saint-Gilles-Croix-de-Vie to Nantes, 120 km (75 mi)

Stage 20 result

Rank	Rider	Team	Time
1	Gerard Vianen (NED)	Gan–Mercier–Hutchinson	2h 53' 21"
2	Patrick Sercu (BEL)	Brooklyn	+ 20"
3	Marc Demeyer (BEL)	Carpenter–Confortluxe–Flandria	s.t.
4	Barry Hoban (GBR)	Gan–Mercier–Hutchinson	s.t.
5	Gerben Karstens (NED)	Bic	s.t.
6	Dirk Baert (BEL)	MIC–Ludo–de Gribaldy	s.t.
7	Eddy Merckx (BEL)	Molteni	s.t.
8	Herman Van Springel (BEL)	MIC–Ludo–de Gribaldy	s.t.
9	Piet van Katwijk (NED)	Frisol–Flair Plastics	s.t.
10	Robert Mintkiewicz (FRA)	Sonolor–Gitane	s.t.

General classification after stage 20

Rank	Rider	Team	Time
1	Eddy Merckx (BEL)	Molteni	109h 20' 31"
2	Vicente López Carril (ESP)	Kas–Kaskol	+ 3' 28"
3	Raymond Poulidor (FRA)	Gan–Mercier–Hutchinson	+ 5' 44"
4	Wladimiro Panizza (ITA)	Brooklyn	+ 6' 42"
5	Gonzalo Aja (ESP)	Kas–Kaskol	+ 6' 59"
6	Joaquim Agostinho (POR)	Bic	+ 11' 51"
7	Mariano Martínez (FRA)	Sonolor–Gitane	+ 14' 34"
8	Michel Pollentier (BEL)	Carpenter–Confortluxe–Flandria	+ 14' 45"
9	Alain Santy (FRA)	Gan–Mercier–Hutchinson	+ 15' 53"
10	Herman Van Springel (BEL)	MIC–Ludo–de Gribaldy	+ 20' 01"

== Stage 21a ==
20 July 1974 - Vouvray to Orléans, 113 km (70 mi)

Stage 21a result

Rank	Rider	Team	Time
1	Eddy Merckx (BEL)	Molteni	2h 19' 05"
2	Patrick Sercu (BEL)	Brooklyn	+ 1' 25"
3	Barry Hoban (GBR)	Gan–Mercier–Hutchinson	s.t.
4	Jacques Esclassan (FRA)	Peugeot–BP–Michelin	s.t.
5	Marc Demeyer (BEL)	Carpenter–Confortluxe–Flandria	s.t.
6	Dirk Baert (BEL)	MIC–Ludo–de Gribaldy	s.t.
7	Ferdinand Julien (FRA)	Sonolor–Gitane	s.t.
8	Donald Allan (AUS)	Frisol–Flair Plastics	s.t.
9	Régis Ovion (FRA)	Peugeot–BP–Michelin	s.t.
10	Herman Van Springel (BEL)	MIC–Ludo–de Gribaldy	s.t.

General classification after stage 21a

Rank	Rider	Team	Time
1	Eddy Merckx (BEL)	Molteni	111h 39' 16"
2	Vicente López Carril (ESP)	Kas–Kaskol	+ 5' 13"
3	Raymond Poulidor (FRA)	Gan–Mercier–Hutchinson	+ 7' 29"
4	Wladimiro Panizza (ITA)	Brooklyn	+ 8' 27"
5	Gonzalo Aja (ESP)	Kas–Kaskol	+ 8' 44"
6	Joaquim Agostinho (POR)	Bic	+ 13' 36"
7	Mariano Martínez (FRA)	Sonolor–Gitane	+ 16' 19"
8	Michel Pollentier (BEL)	Carpenter–Confortluxe–Flandria	+ 16' 24"
9	Alain Santy (FRA)	Gan–Mercier–Hutchinson	+ 17' 38"
10	Herman Van Springel (BEL)	MIC–Ludo–de Gribaldy	+ 21' 46"

== Stage 21b ==
20 July 1974 - Orléans, 37 km (23 mi) (ITT)

Stage 21b result

Rank	Rider	Team	Time
1	Michel Pollentier (BEL)	Carpenter–Confortluxe–Flandria	48' 23"
2	Eddy Merckx (BEL)	Molteni	+ 10"
3	Jesús Manzaneque (ESP)	La Casera–Bahamontes	+ 27"
4	Dirk Baert (BEL)	MIC–Ludo–de Gribaldy	s.t.
5	Raymond Poulidor (FRA)	Gan–Mercier–Hutchinson	+ 29"
6	Joaquim Agostinho (POR)	Bic	+ 38"
7	Joseph Bruyère (BEL)	Molteni	+ 41"
8	Jean-Pierre Danguillaume (FRA)	Peugeot–BP–Michelin	+ 1' 03"
9	Bernard Labourdette (FRA)	Bic	+ 1' 50"
10	Mariano Martínez (FRA)	Sonolor–Gitane	+ 2 04"

General classification after stage 21b

Rank	Rider	Team	Time
1	Eddy Merckx (BEL)	Molteni	112h 27' 49"
2	Raymond Poulidor (FRA)	Gan–Mercier–Hutchinson	+ 7' 48"
3	Vicente López Carril (ESP)	Kas–Kaskol	+ 7' 49"
4	Wladimiro Panizza (ITA)	Brooklyn	+ 10' 39"
5	Gonzalo Aja (ESP)	Kas–Kaskol	+ 11' 04"
6	Joaquim Agostinho (POR)	Bic	+ 14' 04"
7	Michel Pollentier (BEL)	Carpenter–Confortluxe–Flandria	+ 16' 14"
8	Mariano Martínez (FRA)	Sonolor–Gitane	+ 18' 13"
9	Alain Santy (FRA)	Gan–Mercier–Hutchinson	+ 19' 35"
10	Herman Van Springel (BEL)	MIC–Ludo–de Gribaldy	+ 23' 51"

== Stage 22 ==
21 July 1974 - Orléans to Paris, 146 km (91 mi)

Stage 22 result

Rank	Rider	Team	Time
1	Eddy Merckx (BEL)	Molteni	3h 49' 29"
2	Staf Van Roosbroeck (BEL)	MIC–Ludo–de Gribaldy	s.t.
3	Patrick Sercu (BEL)	Brooklyn	s.t.
4	Aldo Parecchini (ITA)	Brooklyn	s.t.
5	Jacques Esclassan (FRA)	Peugeot–BP–Michelin	s.t.
6	Régis Ovion (FRA)	Peugeot–BP–Michelin	s.t.
7	Herman Van Springel (BEL)	MIC–Ludo–de Gribaldy	s.t.
8	Barry Hoban (GBR)	Gan–Mercier–Hutchinson	s.t.
9	Gerrie Knetemann (NED)	Gan–Mercier–Hutchinson	s.t.
10	Marc Demeyer (BEL)	Carpenter–Confortluxe–Flandria	s.t.

General classification after stage 22

Rank	Rider	Team	Time
1	Eddy Merckx (BEL)	Molteni	116h 16' 58"
2	Raymond Poulidor (FRA)	Gan–Mercier–Hutchinson	+ 8' 04"
3	Vicente López Carril (ESP)	Kas–Kaskol	+ 8' 09"
4	Wladimiro Panizza (ITA)	Brooklyn	+ 10' 59"
5	Gonzalo Aja (ESP)	Kas–Kaskol	+ 11' 24"
6	Joaquim Agostinho (POR)	Bic	+ 14' 24"
7	Michel Pollentier (BEL)	Carpenter–Confortluxe–Flandria	+ 16' 34"
8	Mariano Martínez (FRA)	Sonolor–Gitane	+ 18' 33"
9	Alain Santy (FRA)	Gan–Mercier–Hutchinson	+ 19' 55"
10	Herman Van Springel (BEL)	MIC–Ludo–de Gribaldy	+ 24' 11"
