= 1974 Tour de France, Prologue to Stage 11 =

Cycling race stages

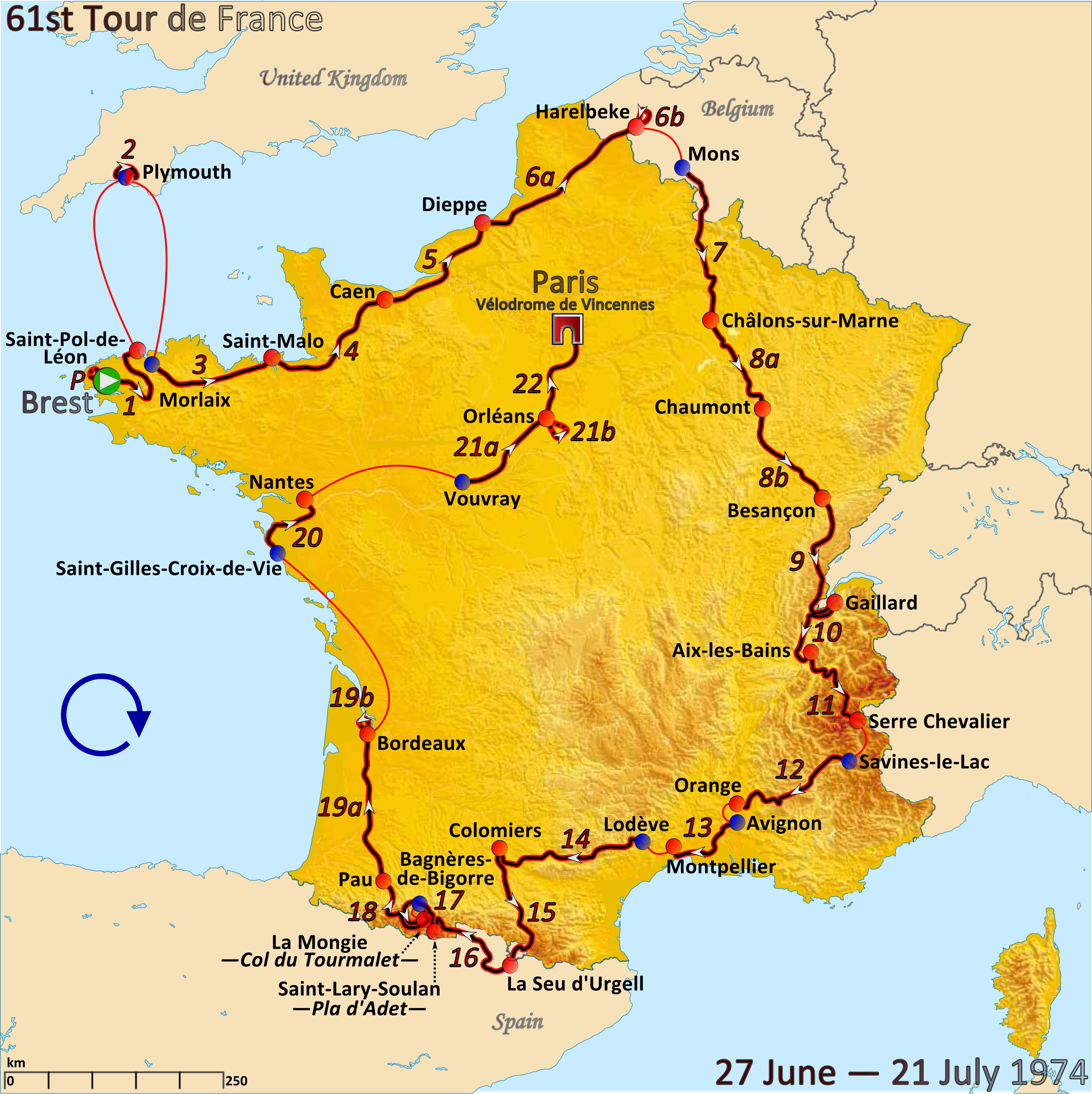
Route of the 1974 Tour de France

The 1974 Tour de France was the 61st edition of Tour de France, one of cycling's Grand Tours. The Tour began in Brest with a prologue individual time trial on 27 June and Stage 11 occurred on 8 July with a mountainous stage to Serre Chevalier. The race finished in Paris on 21 July.

== Prologue ==
27 June 1974 - Brest, 7 km (4.3 mi) (ITT)

Prologue result and General Classification after Prologue

	Rider	Team	Time
1	Eddy Merckx (BEL)	Molteni	8' 51.21"
2	Jesús Manzaneque (ESP)	La Casera–Bahamontes	+ 11"
3	Joseph Bruyère (BEL)	Molteni	+ 12"
4	Joaquim Agostinho (POR)	Bic	+ 13"
5	Dirk Baert (BEL)	MIC–Ludo–de Gribaldy	+ 15"
6	Gerben Karstens (NED)	Bic	s.t.
7	Jean-Pierre Danguillaume (FRA)	Peugeot–BP–Michelin	+ 17"
8	Bernard Thévenet (FRA)	Peugeot–BP–Michelin	+ 19"
9	Michel Pollentier (BEL)	Carpenter–Confortluxe–Flandria	+ 20"
10	Herman Van Springel (BEL)	MIC–Ludo–de Gribaldy	+ 21"

== Stage 1 ==
28 June 1974 - Brest to Saint-Pol-de-Léon, 144 km (89.5 mi)

Stage 1 result

Rank	Rider	Team	Time
1	Ercole Gualazzini (ITA)	Brooklyn	3h 25' 30"
2	Joseph Bruyère (BEL)	Molteni	+ 1"
3	Herman Van Springel (BEL)	MIC–Ludo–de Gribaldy	+ 4"
4	Gerben Karstens (NED)	Bic	+ 25"
5	Frans Van Looy (BEL)	Carpenter–Confortluxe–Flandria	s.t.
6	Eddy Merckx (BEL)	Molteni	s.t.
7	Patrick Sercu (BEL)	Brooklyn	s.t.
8	Piet van Katwijk (NED)	Frisol–Flair Plastics	s.t.
9	Barry Hoban (GBR)	Gan–Mercier–Hutchinson	s.t.
10	Cees Priem (NED)	Frisol–Flair Plastics	s.t.

General classification after stage 1

Rank	Rider	Team	Time
1	Joseph Bruyère (BEL)	Molteni	3h 34' 18"
2	Eddy Merckx (BEL)	Molteni	+ 16"
3	Herman Van Springel (BEL)	MIC–Ludo–de Gribaldy	+ 26"
4	Jesús Manzaneque (ESP)	La Casera–Bahamontes	+ 34"
5	Gerben Karstens (NED)	Bic	+ 37"
6	Ercole Gualazzini (ITA)	Brooklyn	+ 39"
7	Joaquim Agostinho (POR)	Bic	+ 41"
8	Dirk Baert (BEL)	MIC–Ludo–de Gribaldy	+ 45"
9	Jean-Pierre Danguillaume (FRA)	Peugeot–BP–Michelin	+ 48"
10	Bernard Thévenet (FRA)	Peugeot–BP–Michelin	+ 51"

== Stage 2 ==
29 June 1974 - Plymouth, 164 km (101.9 mi)

Stage 2 result

Rank	Rider	Team	Time
1	Henk Poppe (NED)	Frisol–Flair Plastics	3h 53' 44"
2	Jacques Esclassan (FRA)	Peugeot–BP–Michelin	s.t.
3	Patrick Sercu (BEL)	Brooklyn	s.t.
4	Gerben Karstens (NED)	Bic	s.t.
5	Herman Van Springel (BEL)	MIC–Ludo–de Gribaldy	s.t.
6	Piet van Katwijk (NED)	Frisol–Flair Plastics	s.t.
7	Cees Priem (NED)	Frisol–Flair Plastics	s.t.
8	Miguel María Lasa (ESP)	Kas–Kaskol	s.t.
9	Barry Hoban (GBR)	Gan–Mercier–Hutchinson	s.t.
10	Staf Van Roosbroeck (BEL)	MIC–Ludo–de Gribaldy	s.t.

General classification after stage 2

Rank	Rider	Team	Time
1	Joseph Bruyère (BEL)	Molteni	7h 28' 02"
2	Eddy Merckx (BEL)	Molteni	+ 10"
3	Gerben Karstens (NED)	Bic	+ 22"
4	Herman Van Springel (BEL)	MIC–Ludo–de Gribaldy	+ 24"
5	Jesús Manzaneque (ESP)	La Casera–Bahamontes	+ 34"
6	Ercole Gualazzini (ITA)	Brooklyn	+ 39"
7	Joaquim Agostinho (POR)	Bic	+ 41"
8	Dirk Baert (BEL)	MIC–Ludo–de Gribaldy	+ 45"
9	Barry Hoban (GBR)	Gan–Mercier–Hutchinson	+ 47"
10	Jean-Pierre Danguillaume (FRA)	Peugeot–BP–Michelin	+ 48"

== Stage 3 ==
30 June 1974 - Morlaix to Saint-Malo, 190 km (120 mi)

Stage 3 result

Rank	Rider	Team	Time
1	Patrick Sercu (BEL)	Brooklyn	4h 45' 57"
2	Régis Delépine (FRA)	Flandria–Shimano–Merlin Plage	s.t.
3	Piet van Katwijk (NED)	Frisol–Flair Plastics	s.t.
4	Gerben Karstens (NED)	Bic	s.t.
5	Staf Van Roosbroeck (BEL)	MIC–Ludo–de Gribaldy	s.t.
6	Jacques Esclassan (FRA)	Peugeot–BP–Michelin	s.t.
7	Jack Mourioux (FRA)	Gan–Mercier–Hutchinson	s.t.
8	Barry Hoban (GBR)	Gan–Mercier–Hutchinson	s.t.
9	Cees Priem (NED)	Frisol–Flair Plastics	s.t.
10	Robert Mintkiewicz (FRA)	Sonolor–Gitane	s.t.

General classification after stage 3

Rank	Rider	Team	Time
1	Joseph Bruyère (BEL)	Molteni	12h 13' 59"
2	Eddy Merckx (BEL)	Molteni	+ 2"
3	Gerben Karstens (NED)	Bic	+ 15"
4	Herman Van Springel (BEL)	MIC–Ludo–de Gribaldy	+ 20"
5	Ercole Gualazzini (ITA)	Brooklyn	+ 33"
6	Patrick Sercu (BEL)	Brooklyn	+ 34"
7	Jesús Manzaneque (ESP)	La Casera–Bahamontes	s.t.
8	Joaquim Agostinho (POR)	Bic	+ 41"
9	Barry Hoban (GBR)	Gan–Mercier–Hutchinson	+ 43"
10	Jean-Pierre Danguillaume (FRA)	Peugeot–BP–Michelin	+ 48"

== Stage 4 ==
1 July 1974 - Saint-Malo to Caen, 184 km (114 mi)

Stage 4 result

Rank	Rider	Team	Time
1	Patrick Sercu (BEL)	Brooklyn	4h 48' 54"
2	Gerben Karstens (NED)	Bic	s.t.
3	Ercole Gualazzini (ITA)	Brooklyn	s.t.
4	Cyrille Guimard (FRA)	Flandria–Shimano–Merlin Plage	s.t.
5	Piet van Katwijk (NED)	Frisol–Flair Plastics	s.t.
6	Miguel María Lasa (ESP)	Kas–Kaskol	s.t.
7	Staf Van Roosbroeck (BEL)	MIC–Ludo–de Gribaldy	s.t.
8	Jack Mourioux (FRA)	Gan–Mercier–Hutchinson	s.t.
9	Barry Hoban (GBR)	Gan–Mercier–Hutchinson	s.t.
10	Régis Ovion (FRA)	Peugeot–BP–Michelin	s.t.

General classification after stage 4

Rank	Rider	Team	Time
1	Eddy Merckx (BEL)	Molteni	17h 02' 49"
2	Joseph Bruyère (BEL)	Molteni	+ 4"
3	Patrick Sercu (BEL)	Brooklyn	+ 18"
4	Herman Van Springel (BEL)	MIC–Ludo–de Gribaldy	+ 22"
5	Ercole Gualazzini (ITA)	Brooklyn	+ 26"
6	Jesús Manzaneque (ESP)	La Casera–Bahamontes	+ 38"
7	Barry Hoban (GBR)	Gan–Mercier–Hutchinson	+ 43"
8	Joaquim Agostinho (POR)	Bic	+ 45"
9	Jean-Pierre Danguillaume (FRA)	Peugeot–BP–Michelin	+ 52"
10	Bernard Thévenet (FRA)	Peugeot–BP–Michelin	+ 55"

== Stage 5 ==
2 July 1974 - Caen to Dieppe, 165 km (103 mi)

Stage 5 result

Rank	Rider	Team	Time
1	Ronald De Witte (BEL)	Carpenter–Confortluxe–Flandria	4h 15' 34"
2	Patrick Sercu (BEL)	Brooklyn	s.t.
3	Cyrille Guimard (FRA)	Flandria–Shimano–Merlin Plage	s.t.
4	Ercole Gualazzini (ITA)	Brooklyn	s.t.
5	Barry Hoban (GBR)	Gan–Mercier–Hutchinson	s.t.
6	Jacques Esclassan (FRA)	Peugeot–BP–Michelin	s.t.
7	Miguel María Lasa (ESP)	Kas–Kaskol	s.t.
8	Marc Demeyer (BEL)	Carpenter–Confortluxe–Flandria	s.t.
9	Michel Pollentier (BEL)	Carpenter–Confortluxe–Flandria	s.t.
10	Wilfried Wesemael (BEL)	MIC–Ludo–de Gribaldy	s.t.

General classification after stage 5

Rank	Rider	Team	Time
1	Gerben Karstens (NED)	Bic	21h 18' 26"
2	Eddy Merckx (BEL)	Molteni	+ 2"
3	Patrick Sercu (BEL)	Brooklyn	+ 9"
4	Ercole Gualazzini (ITA)	Brooklyn	+ 10"
5	Joseph Bruyère (BEL)	Molteni	s.t.
6	Herman Van Springel (BEL)	MIC–Ludo–de Gribaldy	+ 28"
7	Ronald De Witte (BEL)	Carpenter–Confortluxe–Flandria	+ 43"
8	Jesús Manzaneque (ESP)	La Casera–Bahamontes	+ 44"
9	Barry Hoban (GBR)	Gan–Mercier–Hutchinson	+ 439"
10	Joaquim Agostinho (POR)	Bic	+ 51"

== Stage 6a ==
3 July 1974 - Dieppe to Harelbeke, 239 km (149 mi)

Stage 6a result

Rank	Rider	Team	Time
1	Jean-Luc Molinéris (FRA)	Bic	6h 18' 56"
2	Michel Pollentier (BEL)	Carpenter–Confortluxe–Flandria	+ 1"
3	Cees Bal (NED)	Gan–Mercier–Hutchinson	+ 22"
4	Patrick Sercu (BEL)	Brooklyn	s.t.
5	Gerben Karstens (NED)	Bic	s.t.
6	Marc Demeyer (BEL)	Carpenter–Confortluxe–Flandria	s.t.
7	Dirk Baert (BEL)	MIC–Ludo–de Gribaldy	s.t.
8	Wilfried Wesemael (BEL)	MIC–Ludo–de Gribaldy	s.t.
9	Barry Hoban (GBR)	Gan–Mercier–Hutchinson	s.t.
10	Miguel María Lasa (ESP)	Kas–Kaskol	s.t.

General classification after stage 6a

Rank	Rider	Team	Time
1	Patrick Sercu (BEL)	Brooklyn	27h 27' 38"
2	Gerben Karstens (NED)	Bic	+ 2"
3	Eddy Merckx (BEL)	Molteni	+ 8"
4	Ercole Gualazzini (ITA)	Brooklyn	+ 16"
5	Joseph Bruyère (BEL)	Molteni	+ 21"
6	Michel Pollentier (BEL)	Carpenter–Confortluxe–Flandria	+ 31"
7	Herman Van Springel (BEL)	MIC–Ludo–de Gribaldy	+ 36"
8	Jean-Luc Molinéris (FRA)	Bic	+ 51"
9	Ronald De Witte (BEL)	Carpenter–Confortluxe–Flandria	+ 54"
10	Jesús Manzaneque (ESP)	La Casera–Bahamontes	+ 55"

== Stage 6b ==
3 July 1974 - Harelbeke, 9 km (5.6 mi) (TTT)

Stage 6b result

Rank	Team	Time
1	Molteni	54' 05"
2	Kas–Kaskol	+ 1' 15"
3	Bic	+ 1' 26"
4	MIC–Ludo–de Gribaldy	+ 1' 35"
5	Carpenter–Confortluxe–Flandria	+ 1' 57"
6	Gan–Mercier–Hutchinson	+ 2' 31"
7	Brooklyn	+ 2' 56"
8	Frisol–Flair Plastics	+ 3' 52"
9	Sonolor–Gitane	+ 3' 59"
10	Peugeot–BP–Michelin	+ 4' 23"

General classification after stage 6b

Rank	Rider	Team	Time
1	Gerben Karstens (NED)	Bic	27h 37' 36"
2	Eddy Merckx (BEL)	Molteni	s.t.
3	Patrick Sercu (BEL)	Brooklyn	+ 2"
4	Joseph Bruyère (BEL)	Molteni	+ 13"
5	Michel Pollentier (BEL)	Carpenter–Confortluxe–Flandria	+ 33"
6	Herman Van Springel (BEL)	MIC–Ludo–de Gribaldy	+ 36"
7	Jean-Luc Molinéris (FRA)	Bic	+ 43"
8	Barry Hoban (GBR)	Gan–Mercier–Hutchinson	+ 47"
9	Ercole Gualazzini (ITA)	Brooklyn	+ 48"
10	Ronald De Witte (BEL)	Carpenter–Confortluxe–Flandria	+ 56"

== Stage 7 ==
4 July 1974 - Mons to Châlons-sur-Marne, 221 km (137 mi)

Stage 7 result

Rank	Rider	Team	Time
1	Eddy Merckx (BEL)	Molteni	6h 38' 37"
2	Patrick Sercu (BEL)	Brooklyn	s.t.
3	Jacques Esclassan (FRA)	Peugeot–BP–Michelin	s.t.
4	Cyrille Guimard (FRA)	Flandria–Shimano–Merlin Plage	s.t.
5	Herman Van Springel (BEL)	MIC–Ludo–de Gribaldy	s.t.
6	Piet van Katwijk (NED)	Frisol–Flair Plastics	s.t.
7	Willy Teirlinck (BEL)	Sonolor–Gitane	s.t.
8	Gerard Vianen (NED)	Gan–Mercier–Hutchinson	s.t.
9	Jack Mourioux (FRA)	Gan–Mercier–Hutchinson	s.t.
10	Wilfried Wesemael (BEL)	MIC–Ludo–de Gribaldy	s.t.

General classification after stage 7

Rank	Rider	Team	Time
1	Eddy Merckx (BEL)	Molteni	34h 15' 49"
2	Patrick Sercu (BEL)	Brooklyn	+ 5"
3	Gerben Karstens (NED)	Bic	+ 18"
4	Joseph Bruyère (BEL)	Molteni	+ 37"
5	Michel Pollentier (BEL)	Carpenter–Confortluxe–Flandria	+ 57"
6	Herman Van Springel (BEL)	MIC–Ludo–de Gribaldy	+ 1' 00"
7	Barry Hoban (GBR)	Gan–Mercier–Hutchinson	+ 1' 05"
8	Jean-Luc Molinéris (FRA)	Bic	+ 1' 07"
9	Ercole Gualazzini (ITA)	Brooklyn	+ 1' 12"
10	Ronald De Witte (BEL)	Carpenter–Confortluxe–Flandria	+ 1' 20"

== Stage 8a ==
5 July 1974 - Châlons-sur-Marne to Chaumont, 136 km (85 mi)

Stage 8a result

Rank	Rider	Team	Time
1	Cyrille Guimard (FRA)	Flandria–Shimano–Merlin Plage	3h 44' 08"
2	Ronald De Witte (BEL)	Carpenter–Confortluxe–Flandria	s.t.
3	Andrés Oliva (ESP)	La Casera–Bahamontes	s.t.
4	Gerard Vianen (NED)	Gan–Mercier–Hutchinson	s.t.
5	Georges Pintens (BEL)	MIC–Ludo–de Gribaldy	s.t.
6	Wladimiro Panizza (ITA)	Brooklyn	s.t.
7	Eddy Merckx (BEL)	Molteni	s.t.
8	Raymond Poulidor (FRA)	Gan–Mercier–Hutchinson	s.t.
9	Bernard Thévenet (FRA)	Peugeot–BP–Michelin	s.t.
10	Michel Pollentier (BEL)	Carpenter–Confortluxe–Flandria	s.t.

General classification after stage 8a

Rank	Rider	Team	Time
1	Eddy Merckx (BEL)	Molteni	37h 59' 57"
2	Gerben Karstens (NED)	Bic	+ 14"
3	Joseph Bruyère (BEL)	Molteni	+ 37"
4	Michel Pollentier (BEL)	Carpenter–Confortluxe–Flandria	+ 57"
5	Barry Hoban (GBR)	Gan–Mercier–Hutchinson	+ 1' 03"
6	Ronald De Witte (BEL)	Carpenter–Confortluxe–Flandria	+ 1' 05"
7	Jean-Luc Molinéris (FRA)	Bic	+ 1' 07"
8	Herman Van Springel (BEL)	MIC–Ludo–de Gribaldy	+ 1' 17"
9	Jesús Manzaneque (ESP)	La Casera–Bahamontes	+ 1' 21"
10	Joaquim Agostinho (POR)	Bic	+ 1' 24"

== Stage 8b ==
5 July 1974 - Chaumont to Besançon, 152 km (94 mi)

Stage 8b result

Rank	Rider	Team	Time
1	Patrick Sercu (BEL)	Brooklyn	4h 25' 04"
2	Jacques Esclassan (FRA)	Peugeot–BP–Michelin	s.t.
3	Gerben Karstens (NED)	Bic	s.t.
4	Eddy Merckx (BEL)	Molteni	s.t.
5	Cyrille Guimard (FRA)	Flandria–Shimano–Merlin Plage	s.t.
6	Dirk Baert (BEL)	MIC–Ludo–de Gribaldy	s.t.
7	Barry Hoban (GBR)	Gan–Mercier–Hutchinson	s.t.
8	Charles Rouxel (FRA)	Peugeot–BP–Michelin	s.t.
9	Gerard Vianen (NED)	Gan–Mercier–Hutchinson	s.t.
10	Piet van Katwijk (NED)	Frisol–Flair Plastics	s.t.

General classification after stage 8b

Rank	Rider	Team	Time
1	Eddy Merckx (BEL)	Molteni	42h 24' 48"
2	Gerben Karstens (NED)	Bic	+ 13"
3	Joseph Bruyère (BEL)	Molteni	+ 50"
4	Barry Hoban (GBR)	Gan–Mercier–Hutchinson	+ 1' 04"
5	Michel Pollentier (BEL)	Carpenter–Confortluxe–Flandria	+ 1' 10"
6	Ronald De Witte (BEL)	Carpenter–Confortluxe–Flandria	+ 1' 18"
7	Jean-Luc Molinéris (FRA)	Bic	+ 1' 20"
8	Herman Van Springel (BEL)	MIC–Ludo–de Gribaldy	+ 1' 30"
9	Patrick Sercu (BEL)	Brooklyn	+ 1' 34"
10	Jesús Manzaneque (ESP)	La Casera–Bahamontes	s.t.

== Stage 9 ==
6 July 1974 - Besançon to Gaillard, 241 km (150 mi)

Stage 9 result

Rank	Rider	Team	Time
1	Eddy Merckx (BEL)	Molteni	7h 09' 58"
2	Wladimiro Panizza (ITA)	Brooklyn	s.t.
3	Raymond Poulidor (FRA)	Gan–Mercier–Hutchinson	s.t.
4	Joaquim Agostinho (POR)	Bic	s.t.
5	Gonzalo Aja (ESP)	Kas–Kaskol	s.t.
6	Vicente López Carril (ESP)	Kas–Kaskol	+ 18"
7	Herman Van Springel (BEL)	MIC–Ludo–de Gribaldy	+ 2' 27"
8	Miguel María Lasa (ESP)	Kas–Kaskol	s.t.
9	Jean-Pierre Danguillaume (FRA)	Peugeot–BP–Michelin	s.t.
10	Alain Santy (FRA)	Gan–Mercier–Hutchinson	s.t.

General classification after stage 9

Rank	Rider	Team	Time
1	Eddy Merckx (BEL)	Molteni	49h 34' 46"
2	Joaquim Agostinho (POR)	Bic	+ 1' 37"
3	Raymond Poulidor (FRA)	Gan–Mercier–Hutchinson	+ 2' 01"
4	Wladimiro Panizza (ITA)	Brooklyn	+ 2' 02"
5	Gonzalo Aja (ESP)	Kas–Kaskol	+ 2' 12"
6	Vicente López Carril (ESP)	Kas–Kaskol	+ 2' 18"
7	Herman Van Springel (BEL)	MIC–Ludo–de Gribaldy	+ 3' 57"
8	Miguel María Lasa (ESP)	Kas–Kaskol	+ 4' 10"
9	Jean-Pierre Danguillaume (FRA)	Peugeot–BP–Michelin	+ 4' 15"
10	Joseph Bruyère (BEL)	Molteni	+ 4' 21"

== Stage 10 ==
7 July 1974 - Gaillard to Aix-les-Bains, 131 km (81 mi)

Stage 10 result

Rank	Rider	Team	Time
1	Eddy Merckx (BEL)	Molteni	3h 46' 44"
2	Mariano Martínez (FRA)	Sonolor–Gitane	s.t.
3	Raymond Poulidor (FRA)	Gan–Mercier–Hutchinson	s.t.
4	Gonzalo Aja (ESP)	Kas–Kaskol	s.t.
5	Fausto Bertoglio (ITA)	Brooklyn	+ 1' 02"
6	Wladimiro Panizza (ITA)	Brooklyn	s.t.
7	Joaquim Agostinho (POR)	Bic	+ 39"
8	Vicente López Carril (ESP)	Kas–Kaskol	+ 1' 02"
9	Michel Pollentier (BEL)	Carpenter–Confortluxe–Flandria	s.t.
10	Michel Périn (FRA)	Gan–Mercier–Hutchinson	+ 1' 57"

General classification after stage 10

Rank	Rider	Team	Time
1	Eddy Merckx (BEL)	Molteni	53h 21' 30"
2	Raymond Poulidor (FRA)	Gan–Mercier–Hutchinson	+ 2' 01"
3	Gonzalo Aja (ESP)	Kas–Kaskol	+ 2' 12"
4	Joaquim Agostinho (POR)	Bic	+ 2' 16"
5	Wladimiro Panizza (ITA)	Brooklyn	+ 3' 04"
6	Vicente López Carril (ESP)	Kas–Kaskol	+ 3' 20"
7	Mariano Martínez (FRA)	Sonolor–Gitane	+ 4' 38"
8	Michel Pollentier (BEL)	Carpenter–Confortluxe–Flandria	+ 5' 43"
9	Andrés Oliva (ESP)	La Casera–Bahamontes	+ 6' 24"
10	Alain Santy (FRA)	Gan–Mercier–Hutchinson	+ 6' 27"

== Stage 11 ==
8 July 1974 - Aix-les-Bains to Serre Chevalier, 199 km (124 mi)

Stage 11 result

Rank	Rider	Team	Time
1	Vicente López Carril (ESP)	Kas–Kaskol	6h 55' 36"
2	Eddy Merckx (BEL)	Molteni	+ 54"
3	Francisco Galdós (ESP)	Kas–Kaskol	s.t.
4	Gonzalo Aja (ESP)	Kas–Kaskol	s.t.
5	Roger Pingeon (FRA)	Jobo–Lejeune	+ 2' 23"
6	Wladimiro Panizza (ITA)	Brooklyn	s.t.
7	Alain Santy (FRA)	Gan–Mercier–Hutchinson	s.t.
8	Herman Van Springel (BEL)	MIC–Ludo–de Gribaldy	+ 3' 46"
9	Joaquim Agostinho (POR)	Bic	s.t.
10	Raymond Poulidor (FRA)	Gan–Mercier–Hutchinson	+ 6' 17"

General classification after stage 11

Rank	Rider	Team	Time
1	Eddy Merckx (BEL)	Molteni	60h 17' 52"
2	Gonzalo Aja (ESP)	Kas–Kaskol	+ 2' 20"
3	Vicente López Carril (ESP)	Kas–Kaskol	+ 2' 34"
4	Wladimiro Panizza (ITA)	Brooklyn	+ 4' 41"
5	Joaquim Agostinho (POR)	Bic	+ 5' 16"
6	Raymond Poulidor (FRA)	Gan–Mercier–Hutchinson	+ 7' 32"
7	Francisco Galdós (ESP)	Kas–Kaskol	+ 7' 37"
8	Alain Santy (FRA)	Gan–Mercier–Hutchinson	+ 8' 04"
9	Mariano Martínez (FRA)	Sonolor–Gitane	+ 10' 50"
10	Herman Van Springel (BEL)	MIC–Ludo–de Gribaldy	+ 11' 01"

== Rest Day 1 ==
9 July 1974 - Aix-les-Bains
