= 1974 Tour de France =

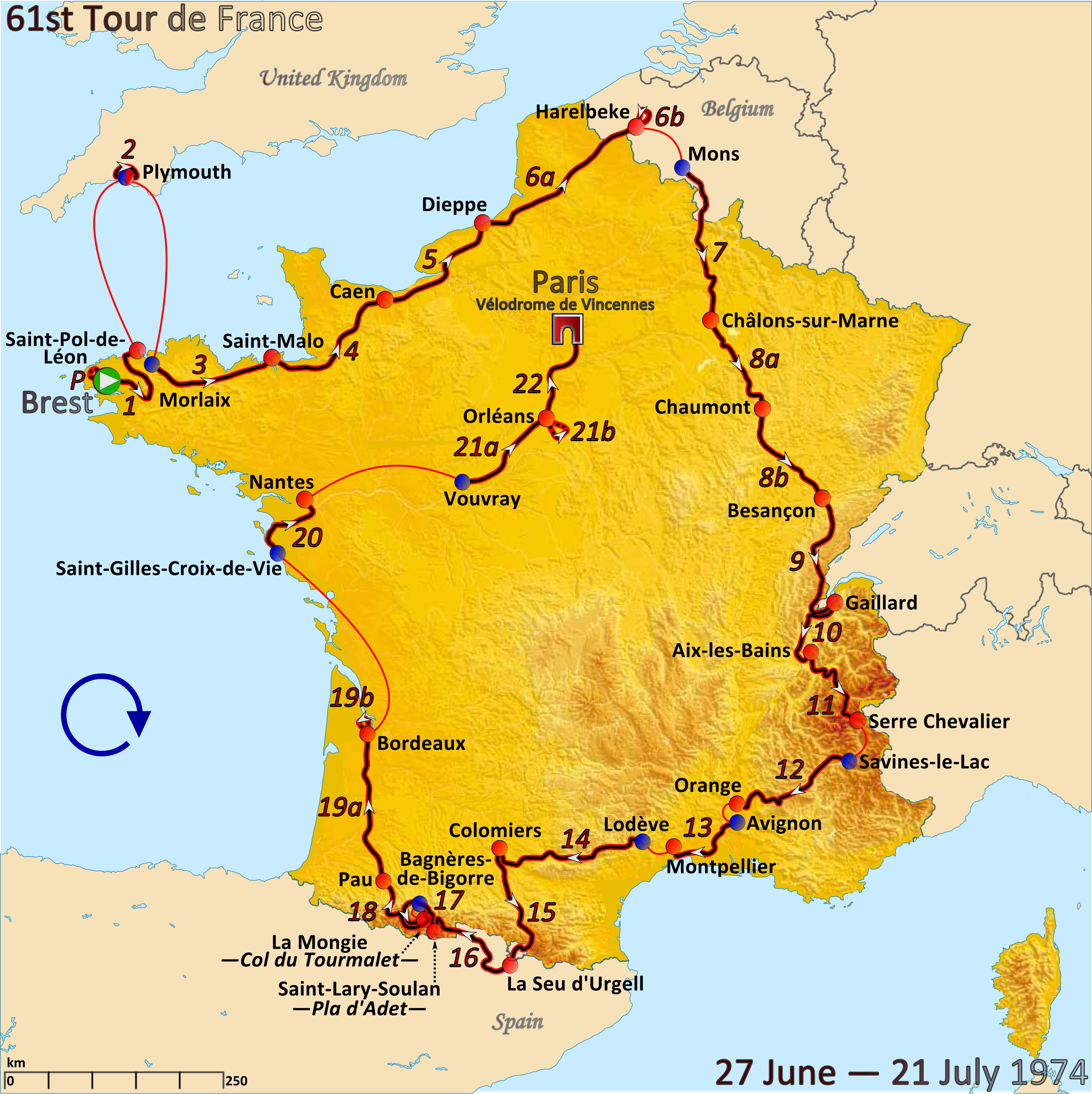
- Route of the 1974 Tour de France

Race details
- Dates: 27 June – 21 July 1974
- Stages: 22 + Prologue, including four split stages
- Distance: 4,098 km (2,546 mi)
- Winning time: 116h 16' 58"

Results
Jersey awarded to the overall winner	Winner	Eddy Merckx (BEL)	(Molteni)
	Second	Raymond Poulidor (FRA)	(Gan–Mercier)
	Third	Vicente López Carril (ESP)	(Kas–Kaskol)
Jersey awarded to the points classification winner	Points	Patrick Sercu (BEL)	(Brooklyn)
	Mountains	Domingo Perurena (ESP)	(Kas–Kaskol)
Jersey awarded to the combination classification winner	Combination	Eddy Merckx (BEL)	(Molteni)
	Sprints	Barry Hoban (GBR)	(Gan–Mercier–Hutchinson)
	Combativity	Eddy Merckx (BEL)	(Molteni)
	Team	Kas–Kaskol	
	Team points	Gan–Mercier–Hutchinson	

The 1974 Tour de France was the 61st edition of the Tour de France, one of cycling's Grand Tours. It took place between 27 June and 21 July, with 22 stages covering a distance of 4,098 km (2,546 mi). Eddy Merckx was attempting to win his fifth Tour de France in as many races.

In 1974 the tour made its first visit to the United Kingdom, with a circuit stage on the Plympton By-pass, near Plymouth, England.

The race was won by favourite Eddy Merckx, who thus at that point had won all five Tours that he had entered, and had equalled Jacques Anquetil in Tour victories. While he won the race by a comfortable margin, he was not as overwhelmingly dominant as he had been in his previous victories with eight riders finishing within 20:00, two riders within 10:00 and his two top competitors in Luis Ocaña and Joop Zoetemelk absent from the race. Despite other riders finishing closer in the overall standings, Merckx still won an astonishing eight stages. He also won the combination classification. Fellow Belgian Patrick Sercu won the points classification, while Spanish Domingo Perurena won the mountains classification.

== Teams ==
The 1974 Tour de France had 13 teams, with 10 cyclists each.

The teams entering the race were:

- Molteni
- Bic
- Peugeot–BP–Michelin
- Kas–Kaskol
- Sonolor–Gitane
- MIC–Ludo–de Gribaldy
- Gan–Mercier–Hutchinson
- La Casera–Peña Bahamontes
- Merlin Plage–Shimano–Flandria
- Brooklyn
- Jobo–Lejeune
- Carpenter–Confortluxe–Flandria
- Frisol–Flair Plastics

== Pre-race favourites ==
Eddy Merckx, who had been absent in 1973 after winning four Tours in a row, was present again. Merckx had not been as dominant in the spring as in other years; it was his first year as a professional cyclist in which he did not win a spring classic. He did win the 1974 Giro d'Italia and the Tour de Suisse, but after winning the latter he required surgery on the perineum, five days before the 1974 Tour started.

Notable absents were Ocaña and Zoetemelk. Zoetemelk was injured during the Midi Libre and was in hospital with life-threatening meningitis. Between 1970 and 1986 this would be the only Tour Zoetemelk would not start and finish, and would be the only Tour until 1983 that he was not in the top ten.

Ocaña had crashed in the Tour de l'Aude, gone home and was fired by his team for not communicating.

Bernard Thévenet, who was considered a potential winner, had crashed several times in the 1974 Vuelta a España. He did start in the Tour, but was not yet back at his former level.

== Route and stages ==
The 1974 Tour de France started on 27 June, and had two rest days, in Aix-les-Bains and Colomiers. The highest point of elevation in the race was 2,556 m (8,386 ft) at the summit tunnel of the Col du Galibier mountain pass on stage 11.

Stage characteristics and winners
Stage	Date	Course	Distance	Type	Winner
P	27 June	Brest	7 km (4.3 mi)	Individual time trial	Eddy Merckx (BEL)
1	28 June	Brest to Saint-Pol-de-Léon	144 km (89 mi)	Plain stage	Ercole Gualazzini (ITA)
2	29 June	Plymouth (United Kingdom)	164 km (102 mi)	Plain stage	Henk Poppe (NED)
3	30 June	Morlaix to Saint-Malo	190 km (120 mi)	Plain stage	Patrick Sercu (BEL)
4	1 July	Saint-Malo to Caen	184 km (114 mi)	Plain stage	Patrick Sercu (BEL)
5	2 July	Caen to Dieppe	165 km (103 mi)	Plain stage	Ronald de Witte (BEL)
6a	3 July	Dieppe to Harelbeke (Belgium)	239 km (149 mi)	Plain stage	Jean-Luc Molinéris (FRA)
6b	3 July	Harelbeke (Belgium)	9 km (5.6 mi)	Team time trial	(Italy) Molteni
7	4 July	Mons (Belgium) to Châlons-sur-Marne	221 km (137 mi)	Plain stage	Eddy Merckx (BEL)
8a	5 July	Châlons-sur-Marne to Chaumont	136 km (85 mi)	Plain stage	Cyrille Guimard (FRA)
8b	5 July	Chaumont to Besançon	152 km (94 mi)	Plain stage	Patrick Sercu (BEL)
9	6 July	Besançon to Gaillard	241 km (150 mi)	Stage with mountain(s)	Eddy Merckx (BEL)
10	7 July	Gaillard to Aix-les-Bains	131 km (81 mi)	Stage with mountain(s)	Eddy Merckx (BEL)
11	8 July	Aix-les-Bains to Serre Chevalier	199 km (124 mi)	Stage with mountain(s)	Vicente López Carril (ESP)
	9 July	Aix-les-Bains		Rest day	
12	10 July	Savines-le-Lac to Orange	231 km (144 mi)	Stage with mountain(s)	Jos Spruyt (BEL)
13	11 July	Avignon to Montpellier	126 km (78 mi)	Plain stage	Barry Hoban (GBR)
14	12 July	Lodève to Colomiers	249 km (155 mi)	Plain stage	Jean-Pierre Genet (FRA)
	13 July	Colomiers		Rest day	
15	14 July	Colomiers to La Seu d'Urgell (Spain)	225 km (140 mi)	Stage with mountain(s)	Eddy Merckx (BEL)
16	15 July	La Seu d'Urgell to Saint-Lary-Soulan Pla d'Adet	209 km (130 mi)	Stage with mountain(s)	Raymond Poulidor (FRA)
17	16 July	Saint-Lary-Soulan to La Mongie	119 km (74 mi)	Stage with mountain(s)	Jean-Pierre Danguillaume (FRA)
18	17 July	Bagnères-de-Bigorre to Pau	141 km (88 mi)	Stage with mountain(s)	Jean-Pierre Danguillaume (FRA)
19a	18 July	Pau to Bordeaux	196 km (122 mi)	Plain stage	Francis Campaner (FRA)
19b	18 July	Bordeaux	12 km (7.5 mi)	Individual time trial	Eddy Merckx (BEL)
20	19 July	Saint-Gilles-Croix-de-Vie to Nantes	120 km (75 mi)	Plain stage	Gerard Vianen (NED)
21a	20 July	Vouvray to Orléans	113 km (70 mi)	Plain stage	Eddy Merckx (BEL)
21b	20 July	Orléans	37 km (23 mi)	Individual time trial	Michel Pollentier (BEL)
22	21 July	Orléans to Paris	146 km (91 mi)	Plain stage	Eddy Merckx (BEL)
	Total		4,098 km (2,546 mi)		

== Race overview ==
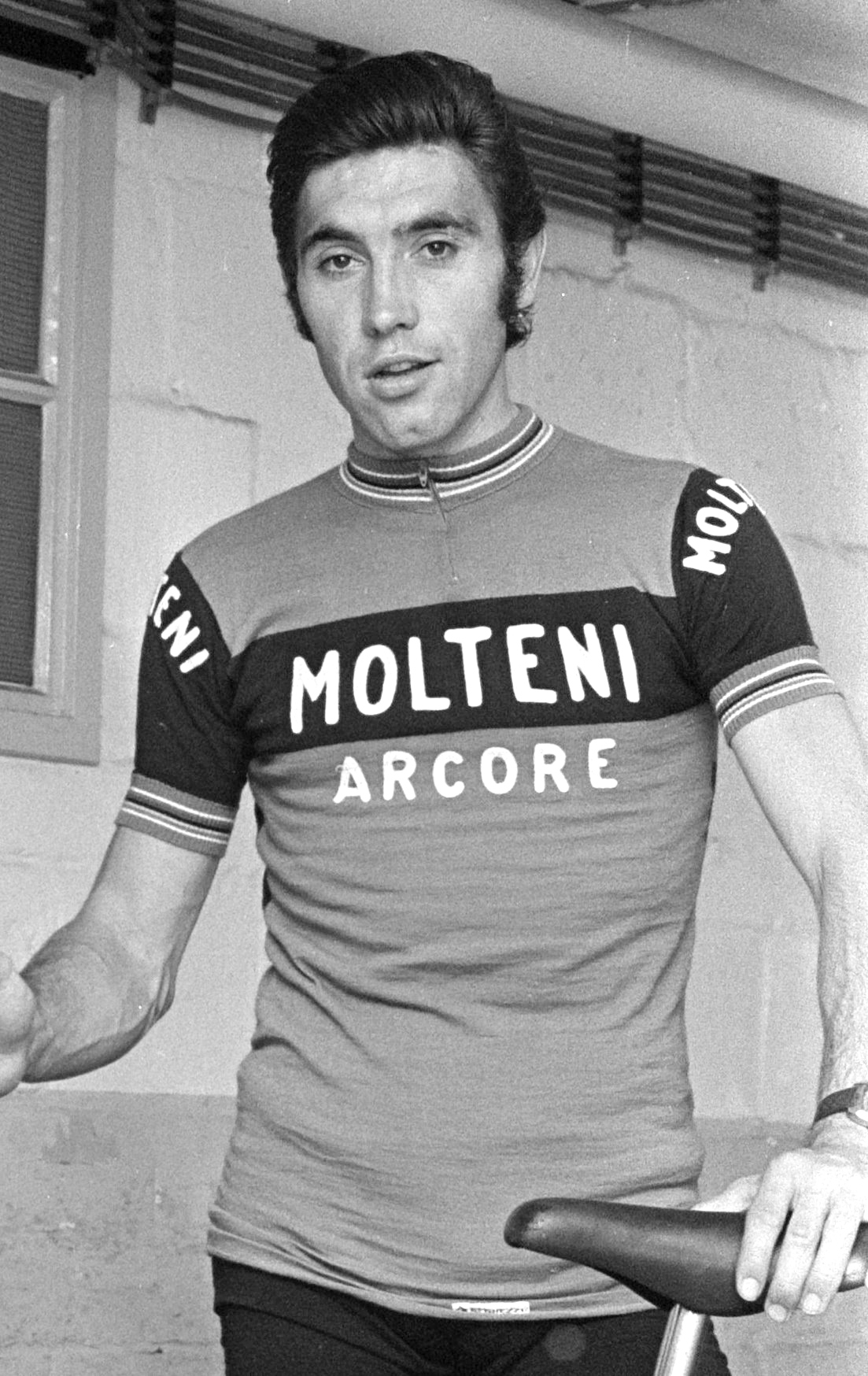
Eddy Merckx (pictured in 1973), winner of the general classification, his fifth

Merckx won the prologue, with his teammate Joseph Bruyère in third place. In the first stage, Bruyère was part of a breakaway, and became the new leader.

The second stage was in Plymouth, the first time that the Tour de France visited England. The riders did not like the experiment, as the British immigration officials made the cyclists wait for a long time when entering the country and again when returning to France.

Merckx collected bonus time in the sprints, and in the fourth stage took back the leading position in the general classification, with Gerben Karstens in second place. Karstens was also doing well in the points classification, and felt Merckx and Patrick Sercu, the leaders in the general and points classification, were helping each other. (Note: Merckx and Sercu were in different teams, but were good friend, and in winters rode together in six-day racing.) Karstens was angry and after the finish quickly went away, but forgot that he had to go to the doping control. For this, he was given ten minutes penalty time, and thus he lost his second place in the general classification. Karstens complained to the jury, and other cyclists threatened with a strike, so the jury removed the penalty after the fifth stage. Thanks to bonification seconds in that stage, Karstens took the leading position after that stage.

It was still close in the top of the general classification. Patrick Sercu became the new leader after the first part of the sixth stage, but Karstens regained the lead after the second part of the sixth stage, a team time trial won by Merckx's team, Molteni. Merckx won the seventh stage, and became the next leader.

The Alps were the first serious mountains to be seen, in stage nine. Merckx won the stage, but the surprise of the day was Raymond Poulidor, who at 38 years old was still able to escape during the toughest part of the stage. This also happened in the tenth stage: Poulidor joined the crucial escape, but could not beat Merckx in the final sprint.

In the tenth stage, the hardest Alpine stage, Vicente López Carril from the KAS team stayed away. Merckx was in the next group, together with Francisco Galdós and Gonzalo Aja, also from the KAS team. Aja was in third place in the general classification, so Merckx was unable to chase López Carril without helping his rival Aja.

The next stages did not change the general classification. In the fifteenth stage, the Pyrenées were encountered. There was a crash that took down Galdós, now in sixth place in the general classification, and he had to leave the race.

The Tour was in Spain at that point, and Basque separatist placed bombs on press and team cars. There was violence around France, Andorra and in Corsica from unrelated protests including from farmers and other angry nationalists and in some areas people hung dead pigs from street lamps. The bombings in the Pyrenees took place in the middle of the night in Lourdes where thirteen vacant buses and two parked cars where destroyed. Then a few hours later at Saint-Lary-Soulan several vehicles associated with the Tour de France were targeted and blown up. No one was in them at the time. Leaflets were distributed threatening the fascist government of Spain and telling Spanish riders to leave the race. Other acts of violence against the Tour included many trees being cut down to block the route, which had to be dealt with and removed.

Nobody was hurt, but cyclists were scared: Spanish champion López Carril did not wear his national champion's jersey, afraid to become a target because of the Spanish flag on it.

In the sixteenth stage, with an uphill finish, Poulidor won, his first Tour stage victory since 1965. Merckx finished in fourth place, losing time to Poulidor, López Carril and Pollentier.

In the seventeenth stage, Poulidor again won time, finishing second after Jean-Pierre Danguillaume, and jumped to the third place in the general classification, behind Merckx and López Carril. Danguillaume also won the eighteenth stage, the last mountain stage. The favourites stayed together with Merckx, and at that point Merckx was more or less certain of the victory, with two time trials remaining, in which he normally would gain time on the others.

Poulidor battled with López-Carril for the second place. After the time trial in the second part of stage 21, Poulidor captured the second place by just one second. Surprisingly, Merckx was in second place in that time trial, beaten by Michel Pollentier. In the last stage, Poulidor increased the margin to López Carril to five seconds due to bonus seconds in an intermediate sprint. At the finish of that last, Sercu finished first in a sprint, but he had blocked the way of Gustaaf Van Roosbroeck, so the jury decided to set him back, and the second rider to finish (Merckx) was declared winner of the stage. Normally, a rider penalized for blocking another rider during a sprint would be set back to the last place of the group that he finished in, but that would have meant that Sercu would have not only lost the stage victory to Merckx, but also the points classification. The jury then declared that only three riders were really sprinting for the stage victory, so Sercu would be set back to the third place; this enabled him to keep his victory in the points classification by 13 points.

=== Doping ===
Cyrille Guimard, who had won the first part of stage eight, tested positive for piperidine after stage thirteen. Three other cyclists tested positive:Claude Tollet, for amphetamine; Daniel Ducreux, for piperidine; Carlos Melero, for piperidine.

== Classification leadership and minor prizes ==
There were several classifications in the 1974 Tour de France, three of them awarding jerseys to their leaders. The most important was the general classification, calculated by adding each cyclist's finishing times on each stage. The cyclist with the least accumulated time was the race leader, identified by the yellow jersey; the winner of this classification is considered the winner of the Tour.

Additionally, there was a points classification, where cyclists got points for finishing among the best in a stage finish, or in intermediate sprints. The cyclist with the most points lead the classification, and was identified with a green jersey.

There was also a mountains classification. The organisation had categorised some climbs as either first, second, third, or fourth-category; points for this classification were won by the first cyclists that reached the top of these climbs first, with more points available for the higher-categorised climbs. The cyclist with the most points lead the classification, but was not identified with a jersey in 1974.

Another classification was the combination classification. This classification was calculated as a combination of the other classifications, its leader wore the white jersey.

The fifth individual classification was the intermediate sprints classification. This classification had similar rules as the points classification, but only points were awarded on intermediate sprints. In 1974, this classification had no associated jersey.

For the team classification, the times of the best three cyclists per team on each stage were added; the leading team was the team with the lowest total time. The riders in the team that led this classification were identified by yellow caps. There was also a team points classification. Cyclists received points according to their finishing position on each stage, with the first rider receiving one point. The first three finishers of each team had their points combined, and the team with the fewest points led the classification. The riders of the team leading this classification wore green caps.

In addition, there was a combativity award, in which a jury composed of journalists gave points after certain stages to the cyclist they considered most combative. The split stages each had a combined winner. At the conclusion of the Tour, Eddy Merckx won the overall super-combativity award, also decided by journalists. The Souvenir Henri Desgrange was given to the first rider to pass the memorial to Tour founder Henri Desgrange near the summit of the Col du Galibier on stage 11. This prize was won by Vicente López Carril.

Classification leadership by stage
Stage	Stage winner	General classification	Points classification	Mountains classification (Note: No jersey was awarded to the leader of the mountains classification until a white jersey with red polka dots was introduced in 1975.)	Combination classification	Intermediate sprints classification	Team classifications		Combativity award
Stage	Stage winner	General classification	Points classification	Mountains classification	Combination classification	Intermediate sprints classification	By time	By points	Combativity award
P	Eddy Merckx	Eddy Merckx	Eddy Merckx	no award	Eddy Merckx	no award	Molteni	MIC–Ludo–de Gribaldy	no award
1	Ercole Gualazzini	Joseph Bruyère	Joseph Bruyère	Lucien Van Impe	Eddy Merckx	Eddy Merckx	Molteni	MIC–Ludo–de Gribaldy	Herman Van Springel
2	Henk Poppe	Joseph Bruyère	Gerben Karstens	Lucien Van Impe	Eddy Merckx	Eddy Merckx	Molteni	MIC–Ludo–de Gribaldy	no award
3	Patrick Sercu	Joseph Bruyère	Patrick Sercu	Willy Teirlinck	Eddy Merckx	Eddy Merckx	Molteni	Molteni	Jean-Luc Molinéris
4	Patrick Sercu	Eddy Merckx	Patrick Sercu	Domingo Perurena	Eddy Merckx	Eddy Merckx	Frisol–Flair Plastics	Brooklyn	Gerrie Knetemann
5	Ronald De Witte	Gerben Karstens	Patrick Sercu	Domingo Perurena	Eddy Merckx	Eddy Merckx	Frisol–Flair Plastics	Brooklyn	Roger Pingeon
6a	Jean-Luc Molinéris	Patrick Sercu	Patrick Sercu	Domingo Perurena	Eddy Merckx	Eddy Merckx	Frisol–Flair Plastics	Brooklyn	
6b	Molteni	Gerben Karstens	Patrick Sercu	Domingo Perurena	Eddy Merckx	Eddy Merckx	Molteni	Brooklyn	
7	Eddy Merckx	Eddy Merckx	Patrick Sercu	Domingo Perurena	Eddy Merckx	Barry Hoban	Molteni	Brooklyn	Herman Van Springel
8a	Cyrille Guimard	Eddy Merckx	Patrick Sercu	Domingo Perurena	Eddy Merckx	Barry Hoban	Molteni	Gan–Mercier–Hutchinson	Jean-Pierre Danguillaume
8b	Patrick Sercu	Eddy Merckx	Patrick Sercu	Domingo Perurena	Eddy Merckx	Barry Hoban	Molteni	Gan–Mercier–Hutchinson	Jean-Pierre Danguillaume
9	Eddy Merckx	Eddy Merckx	Patrick Sercu	Domingo Perurena	Eddy Merckx	Barry Hoban	Kas–Kaskol	Gan–Mercier–Hutchinson	Vicente López Carril
10	Eddy Merckx	Eddy Merckx	Patrick Sercu	Domingo Perurena	Eddy Merckx	Barry Hoban	Kas–Kaskol	Gan–Mercier–Hutchinson	Raymond Poulidor
11	Vicente López Carril	Eddy Merckx	Patrick Sercu	Domingo Perurena	Eddy Merckx	Barry Hoban	Kas–Kaskol	Gan–Mercier–Hutchinson	Vicente López Carril
12	Jos Spruyt	Eddy Merckx	Patrick Sercu	Domingo Perurena	Eddy Merckx	Barry Hoban	Kas–Kaskol	Gan–Mercier–Hutchinson	Fedor den Hertog
13	Barry Hoban	Eddy Merckx	Patrick Sercu	Domingo Perurena	Eddy Merckx	Barry Hoban	Kas–Kaskol	Gan–Mercier–Hutchinson	Michel Coroller
14	Jean-Pierre Genet	Eddy Merckx	Patrick Sercu	Domingo Perurena	Eddy Merckx	Barry Hoban	Kas–Kaskol	Gan–Mercier–Hutchinson	Jean-Pierre Genet
15	Eddy Merckx	Eddy Merckx	Patrick Sercu	Domingo Perurena	Eddy Merckx	Barry Hoban	Kas–Kaskol	Gan–Mercier–Hutchinson	Raymond Delisle
16	Raymond Poulidor	Eddy Merckx	Patrick Sercu	Domingo Perurena	Eddy Merckx	Barry Hoban	Kas–Kaskol	Gan–Mercier–Hutchinson	Raymond Poulidor
17	Jean-Pierre Danguillaume	Eddy Merckx	Patrick Sercu	Domingo Perurena	Eddy Merckx	Barry Hoban	Kas–Kaskol	Gan–Mercier–Hutchinson	Raymond Poulidor
18	Jean-Pierre Danguillaume	Eddy Merckx	Patrick Sercu	Domingo Perurena	Eddy Merckx	Barry Hoban	Kas–Kaskol	Gan–Mercier–Hutchinson	Jean-Pierre Danguillaume
19a	Francis Campaner	Eddy Merckx	Patrick Sercu	Domingo Perurena	Eddy Merckx	Barry Hoban	Kas–Kaskol	Gan–Mercier–Hutchinson	Francis Campaner
19b	Eddy Merckx	Eddy Merckx	Patrick Sercu	Domingo Perurena	Eddy Merckx	Barry Hoban	Kas–Kaskol	Gan–Mercier–Hutchinson	Francis Campaner
20	Gerard Vianen	Eddy Merckx	Patrick Sercu	Domingo Perurena	Eddy Merckx	Barry Hoban	Kas–Kaskol	Gan–Mercier–Hutchinson	Gerard Vianen
21a	Eddy Merckx	Eddy Merckx	Patrick Sercu	Domingo Perurena	Eddy Merckx	Barry Hoban	Kas–Kaskol	Gan–Mercier–Hutchinson	Eddy Merckx
21b	Michel Pollentier	Eddy Merckx	Patrick Sercu	Domingo Perurena	Eddy Merckx	Barry Hoban	Kas–Kaskol	Gan–Mercier–Hutchinson	Eddy Merckx
22	Eddy Merckx	Eddy Merckx	Patrick Sercu	Domingo Perurena	Eddy Merckx	Barry Hoban	Kas–Kaskol	Gan–Mercier–Hutchinson	
Final		Eddy Merckx	Patrick Sercu	Domingo Perurena	Eddy Merckx	Barry Hoban	Kas–Kaskol	Gan–Mercier–Hutchinson	Eddy Merckx

== Final standings ==
Legend
A yellow jersey.	Denotes the winner of the general classification	A green jersey.	Denotes the winner of the points classification
A white jersey.	Denotes the winner of the combination classification		

=== General classification ===
Final general classification (1–10)
Rank	Rider	Team	Time
1	Eddy Merckx (BEL)	Molteni	116h 16' 58"
2	Raymond Poulidor (FRA)	Gan–Mercier–Hutchinson	+ 8' 04"
3	Vicente López Carril (ESP)	Kas–Kaskol	+ 8' 09"
4	Wladimiro Panizza (ITA)	Brooklyn	+ 10' 59"
5	Gonzalo Aja (ESP)	Kas–Kaskol	+ 11' 24"
6	Joaquim Agostinho (POR)	Bic	+ 14' 24"
7	Michel Pollentier (BEL)	Carpenter–Confortluxe–Flandria	+ 16' 34"
8	Mariano Martínez (FRA)	Sonolor–Gitane	+ 18' 33"
9	Alain Santy (FRA)	Gan–Mercier–Hutchinson	+ 19' 55"
10	Herman Van Springel (BEL)	MIC–Ludo–de Gribaldy	+ 24' 11"

Final general classification (11–105)
Rank	Rider	Team	Time
11	Roger Pingeon (FRA)	Jobo–Lejeune	+ 26' 50"
12	Raymond Delisle (FRA)	Peugeot–BP–Michelin	+ 28' 59"
13	Jean-Pierre Danguillaume (FRA)	Peugeot–BP–Michelin	+ 29' 43"
14	Juan Santiago Zurano (ESP)	La Casera–Peña Bahamontes	+ 30' 20"
15	André Romero (FRA)	Jobo–Lejeune	+ 31' 35"
16	Michel Perin (FRA)	Gan–Mercier–Hutchinson	+ 31' 57"
17	Miguel María Lasa (ESP)	Kas–Kaskol	+ 32' 55"
18	Lucien Van Impe (BEL)	Sonolor–Gitane	+ 37' 35"
19	Andrês Oliva (ESP)	La Casera–Peña Bahamontes	+ 37' 48"
20	Bernard Labourdette (FRA)	Bic	+ 38' 02"
21	Joseph Bruyère (BEL)	Molteni	+ 41' 31"
22	Edouard Janssens (BEL)	Molteni	+ 44' 30"
23	Fausto Bertoglio (ITA)	Brooklyn	+ 45' 43"
24	Willy Van Neste (BEL)	Sonolor–Gitane	+ 46' 50"
25	Ronald De Witte (BEL)	Carpenter–Confortluxe–Flandria	+ 47' 10"
26	Giancarlo Bellini (ITA)	Brooklyn	+ 47' 46"
27	Fedor Iwan den Hertog (NED)	Frisol–Flair Plastics	+ 50' 28"
28	José Catieau (FRA)	Bic	+ 51' 11"
29	José Pesarrodona (ESP)	Kas–Kaskol	+ 53' 44"
30	Georges Pintens (BEL)	MIC–Ludo–de Gribaldy	+ 56' 43"
31	Joël Millard (FRA)	Merlin Plage–Shimano–Flandria	+ 57' 08"
32	Ferdinand Julien (FRA)	Sonolor–Gitane	+ 1h 00' 06"
33	Roland Berland (FRA)	Bic	+ 1h 01' 13"
34	Régis Ovion (FRA)	Peugeot–BP–Michelin	+ 1h 05' 22"
35	Marc Lievens (BEL)	Molteni	+ 1h 09' 16"
36	Victor Van Schil (BEL)	Molteni	+ 1h 12' 37"
37	Barry Hoban (GBR)	Gan–Mercier–Hutchinson	+ 1h 13' 11"
38	Gerrie Knetemann (NED)	Gan–Mercier–Hutchinson	+ 1h 14' 15"
39	Francis Campaner (FRA)	Jobo–Lejeune	+ 1h 16' 19"
40	Antonio Martos (ESP)	Kas–Kaskol	+ 1h 18' 02"
41	Marc Demeyer (BEL)	Carpenter–Confortluxe–Flandria	+ 1h 18' 28"
42	Luis Zubero (ESP)	Kas–Kaskol	+ 1h 19' 12"
43	Arturo Pecchielan (ITA)	Brooklyn	+ 1h 19' 15"
44	Domingo Perurena (ESP)	Kas–Kaskol	+ 1h 19' 18"
45	Jos Deschoenmaecker (BEL)	Molteni	+ 1h 19' 36"
46	Jesús Manzaneque (ESP)	La Casera–Peña Bahamontes	+ 1h 19' 54"
47	Jean-Claude Misac (FRA)	Merlin Plage–Shimano–Flandria	+ 1h 23' 26"
48	Christian Blain (FRA)	Jobo–Lejeune	+ 1h 23' 52"
49	Carlos Melero (ESP)	Kas–Kaskol	+ 1h 25' 17"
50	Joseph Spruyt (BEL)	Molteni	+ 1h 25' 41"
51	Sylvain Vasseur (FRA)	Bic	+ 1h 26' 37"
52	Bernard Bourreau (FRA)	Peugeot–BP–Michelin	+ 1h 27' 07"
53	Jan Van De Wiele (BEL)	MIC–Ludo–de Gribaldy	+ 1h 28' 25"
54	Antonio Menéndez (ESP)	Kas–Kaskol	+ 1h 30' 43"
55	André Dierickx (BEL)	Merlin Plage–Shimano–Flandria	+ 1h 32' 18"
56	Gerard Vianen (NED)	Gan–Mercier–Hutchinson	+ 1h 36' 27"
57	Michael Wright (GBR)	Sonolor–Gitane	+ 1h 38' 11"
58	Ludo Delcroix (BEL)	Molteni	+ 1h 38' 13"
59	André Mollet (FRA)	Peugeot–BP–Michelin	+ 1h 38' 40"
60	José Luis Abilleira (ESP)	La Casera–Peña Bahamontes	+ 1h 39' 12"
61	Gerben Karstens (NED)	Bic	+ 1h 39' 19"
62	Dámaso Torres (ESP)	La Casera–Peña Bahamontes	+ 1h 40' 11"
63	Gustaaf Van Roosbroeck (BEL)	MIC–Ludo–de Gribaldy	+ 1h 41' 11"
64	Alain Nogues (FRA)	Sonolor–Gitane	+ 1h 42' 17"
65	Willy Teirlinck (BEL)	Sonolor–Gitane	+ 1h 47' 11"
66	Jos Huysmans (BEL)	Molteni	+ 1h 49' 00"
67	Jean-Pierre Genet (FRA)	Gan–Mercier–Hutchinson	+ 1h 49' 02"
68	Jean-Jacques Sanquer (FRA)	Merlin Plage–Shimano–Flandria	+ 1h 50' 29"
69	Valerio Lualdi (ITA)	Brooklyn	+ 1h 51' 22"
70	Noël Vanclooster (BEL)	MIC–Ludo–de Gribaldy	+ 1h 51' 24"
71	Guy Sibille (FRA)	Peugeot–BP–Michelin	+ 1h 52' 44"
72	Gérard Moneyron (FRA)	Merlin Plage–Shimano–Flandria	+ 1h 53' 52"
73	Wilfried Wesemael (BEL)	MIC–Ludo–de Gribaldy	+ 1h 54' 09"
74	Charles Rouxel (FRA)	Peugeot–BP–Michelin	+ 1h 54' 22"
75	Jacques Esclassan (FRA)	Peugeot–BP–Michelin	+ 1h 56' 47"
76	Christian Raymond (FRA)	Gan–Mercier–Hutchinson	+ 1h 57' 36"
77	Daniel Rébillard (FRA)	Merlin Plage–Shimano–Flandria	+ 1h 58' 03"
78	Wim Prinsen (NED)	Frisol–Flair Plastics	+ 1h 58' 50"
79	Raymond Riotte (FRA)	Peugeot–BP–Michelin	+ 1h 59' 51"
80	Jack Mourioux (FRA)	Gan–Mercier–Hutchinson	+ 2h 00' 06"
81	Alain Vasseur (FRA)	Bic	+ 2h 01' 28"
82	Claude Magni (FRA)	Jobo–Lejeune	+ 2h 06' 03"
83	Frans Mintjens (BEL)	Molteni	+ 2h 06' 43"
84	Henk Prinsen (NED)	Frisol–Flair Plastics	+ 2h 10' 09"
85	Jean-Pierre Guillemot (FRA)	Jobo–Lejeune	+ 2h 12' 12"
86	Jacques Botherel (FRA)	Sonolor–Gitane	+ 2h 12' 37"
87	Robert Mintkiewicz (FRA)	Sonolor–Gitane	+ 2h 16' 05"
88	Ronny Vanmarcke (BEL)	MIC–Ludo–de Gribaldy	+ 2h 17' 34"
89	Patrick Sercu (BEL)	Brooklyn	+ 2h 18' 58"
90	Daniel Ducreux (FRA)	Jobo–Lejeune	+ 2h 19' 20"
91	Gianni Di Lorenzo (ITA)	Brooklyn	+ 2h 20' 52"
92	Bernard Croyet (FRA)	Bic	+ 2h 23' 57"
93	Dirk Baert (BEL)	MIC–Ludo–de Gribaldy	+ 2h 24' 45"
94	Fernando Plaza (ESP)	La Casera–Peña Bahamontes	+ 2h 28' 19"
95	Michel Coroller (FRA)	Merlin Plage–Shimano–Flandria	+ 2h 36' 59"
96	Arthur Van de Vyver (BEL)	Carpenter–Confortluxe–Flandria	+ 2h 38' 42"
97	Aldo Parecchini (ITA)	Brooklyn	+ 2h 41' 11"
98	Alain Cigana (FRA)	Jobo–Lejeune	+ 2h 42' 24"
99	Frans Van Looy (BEL)	Carpenter–Confortluxe–Flandria	+ 2h 46' 03"
100	Daniel Verplancke (BEL)	Carpenter–Confortluxe–Flandria	+ 2h 46' 38"
101	Régis Delépine (FRA)	Merlin Plage–Shimano–Flandria	+ 2h 55' 42"
102	Piet van Katwijk (NED)	Frisol–Flair Plastics	+ 2h 58' 39"
103	Donald John Allan (AUS)	Frisol–Flair Plastics	+ 3h 06' 53"
104	Bernard Masson (FRA)	Jobo–Lejeune	+ 3h 16' 56"
105	Lorenzo Alaimo (ITA)	Frisol–Flair Plastics	+ 3h 55' 46"

=== Points classification ===
Final points classification (1–10)
Rank	Rider	Team	Points
1	Patrick Sercu (BEL)	Brooklyn	283
2	Eddy Merckx (BEL)	Molteni	270
3	Barry Hoban (GBR)	Gan–Mercier–Hutchinson	170
4	Gerben Karstens (NED)	Bic	149
5	Jacques Esclassan (FRA)	Peugeot–BP–Michelin	143
6	Herman Van Springel (BEL)	MIC–Ludo–de Gribaldy	113
7	Michel Pollentier (BEL)	Carpenter–Confortluxe–Flandria	107
8	Piet van Katwijk (NED)	Frisol–Flair Plastics	97
9	Gerard Vianen (NED)	Gan–Mercier–Hutchinson	94
10	Raymond Poulidor (FRA)	Gan–Mercier–Hutchinson	94

=== Mountains classification ===
Final mountains classification (1–10)
Rank	Rider	Team	Points
1	Domingo Perurena (ESP)	Kas–Kaskol	171
2	Eddy Merckx (BEL)	Molteni	133
3	José Luis Abilleira (ESP)	La Casera–Peña Bahamontes	108
4	Gonzalo Aja (ESP)	Kas–Kaskol	104
5	Raymond Poulidor (FRA)	Gan–Mercier–Hutchinson	93
6	Vicente López Carril (ESP)	Kas–Kaskol	84
7	Andrês Oliva (ESP)	La Casera–Peña Bahamontes	80
8	Wladimiro Panizza (ITA)	Brooklyn	55
9	Juan Santiago Zurano (ESP)	La Casera–Peña Bahamontes	44
10	Jean-Pierre Danguillaume (FRA)	Peugeot–BP–Michelin	44

=== Combination classification ===
Final combination classification (1–5)
Rank	Rider	Team	Points
1	Eddy Merckx (BEL)	Molteni	8
2	Michel Pollentier (BEL)	Carpenter–Confortluxe–Flandria	31
3	Raymond Poulidor (FRA)	Gan–Mercier–Hutchinson	36
4	Herman Van Springel (BEL)	MIC–Ludo–de Gribaldy	37
5	Jean-Pierre Danguillaume (FRA)	Peugeot–BP–Michelin	50

=== Intermediate sprints classification ===
Final intermediate sprints classification (1–10)
Rank	Rider	Team	Points
1	Barry Hoban (GBR)	Gan–Mercier–Hutchinson	132
2	Gerben Karstens (NED)	Bic	110
3	Eddy Merckx (BEL)	Molteni	92
4	Michel Coroller (FRA)	Merlin Plage–Shimano–Flandria	39
5	Herman Van Springel (BEL)	MIC–Ludo–de Gribaldy	26
6	Michel Pollentier (BEL)	Carpenter–Confortluxe–Flandria	22
7	Patrick Sercu (BEL)	Brooklyn	20
8	Jean-Pierre Danguillaume (FRA)	Peugeot–BP–Michelin	18
9	Jack Mourioux (FRA)	Gan–Mercier–Hutchinson	18
10	Dirk Baert (BEL)	MIC–Ludo–de Gribaldy	17

=== Team classification ===
Final team classification (1–10)
Rank	Team	Time
1	Kas–Kaskol	350h 24' 27"
2	Gan–Mercier–Hutchinson	+ 15' 26"
3	Molteni	+ 31' 23"
4	Sonolor–Gitane	+ 49' 02"
5	Bic	+ 49' 50"
6	Brooklyn	+ 53' 04"
7	Jobo–Lejeune	+ 1h 01' 09"
8	Peugeot–BP–Michelin	+ 1h 15' 24"
9	La Casera–Peña Bahamontes	+ 1h 34' 47"
10	MIC–Ludo–de Gribaldy	+ 1h 36' 35"

=== Team points classification ===
Final team points classification (1–10)
Rank	Team	Points
1	Gan–Mercier–Hutchinson	1100
2	Peugeot–BP–Michelin	1464
3	Brooklyn	1532
4	MIC–Ludo–de Gribaldy	1630
5	Molteni	1677
6	Sonolor–Gitane	1741
7	Kas–Kaskol	1931
8	Bic	2018
9	Carpenter–Confortluxe–Flandria	2392
10	Merlin Plage–Shimano–Flandria	2516

== Aftermath ==
With his fifth Tour victory, Merckx equalled Jacques Anquetil. Moreover, Merckx had won the first five Tours that he entered. Merckx set a few new records after winning the 1974 Tour:

- Total number of stage victories: 32 (surpassing André Leducq, who had won 25)
- First man to win the Tour de France, Giro d'Italia and Tour de Suisse in one year.

Merckx had already won the 1974 Giro d'Italia earlier that year, and after winning the 1974 Tour de France also won the world championship, and became the first cyclist to win the Triple Crown of Cycling.

== Bibliography ==
- Augendre, Jacques (2016). "Guide historique" [Historical guide] (PDF). Tour de France (in French). Paris: Amaury Sport Organisation. Archived (PDF) from the original on 17 August 2016.
- McGann, Bill; McGann, Carol (2008). The Story of the Tour de France: 1965–2007. Vol. 2. Indianapolis: Dog Ear Publishing. ISBN 978-1-59858-608-4.
- Nauright, John; Parrish, Charles (2012). Sports Around the World: History, Culture, and Practice. Vol. 2. Santa Barbara, California: ABC-CLIO. ISBN 978-1-59884-300-2.
- Saunders, David (1974). Tour de France 1974. Keighley, UK: Kennedy Brothers Publishing.
- van den Akker, Pieter (2018). Tour de France Rules and Statistics: 1903–2018. Self-published. ISBN 978-1-79398-080-9.
