= 1974 UCI Road World Championships – Men's road race =

Men's Individual Road Race
1974 UCI Road World Championships
- Rainbow jersey

Race details
- Dates: August 25, 1974
- Stages: 1
- Distance: 262.5 km (163.1 mi)
- Winning time: 6h 52' 22"

Medalists
| | Gold | Eddy Merckx (BEL) | (Belgium) |
| | Silver | Raymond Poulidor (FRA) | (France) |
| | Bronze | Mariano Martínez (FRA) | (France) |

The Men's Individual Road Race of the 1974 UCI Road World Championships cycling event took place on August 25 in Montreal, Quebec, Canada. The route consisted of twenty-one laps around a circuit that contained two climbs within it, totaling to a length of 262.5 km (163.1 mi). Belgian Eddy Merckx won the race, while French riders Raymond Poulidor and Mariano Martínez finished second and third, respectively. This was Merckx's third victory in the men's road race at the UCI Road World Championships, equaling the record. In addition, he also completed the Triple Crown of Cycling, which consists of winning two Grand Tour races and the men's road race at the UCI Road World Championships in a calendar year.

The day of racing was highlighted by two large solo efforts on the part of the French riders Francis Campaner and Bernard Thévenet. Campaner attacked during the race's second lap and rode solo until being joined in the tenth lap by Gerard Vianen. The two were caught in the twelfth circuit and shortly after their capture, Thévenet attacked on his own and rode on his own through most of the final lap. Merckx initiated a chase group during the seventeenth lap that managed to catch and pass Thévenet with seven kilometers remaining. The group then splintered into two groups of two, with Merckx and Poulidor riding into the finish together. Merckx took victory in the two-man sprint.

== Race route ==
The route for the race consisted of 21 laps that totaled for 262.5 km (163.1 mi) of racing, with each lap being 12.5 km (7.8 mi) in length. Each circuit featured two climbs within it, including a cross of Mount Royal. The route for the race navigated through the Université de Montréal campus. Several sports writers deemed the route to be difficult. The race began at 9 AM local time.

== Participants and race favorites ==
The race began with 70 riders from fifteen countries, of which eighteen managed to finish the race. Reigning champion, Felice Gimondi, started the race despite sustaining injuries from a fall in the Bernocchi Cup the week beforehand. The Belgian team featured the riders Eddy Merckx, Herman Van Springel, Freddy Maertens, Patrick Sercu, and Roger De Vlaeminck, which cycling author William Fotheringham believed to be one of the best Belgian teams to race at the World Championships. Gianni Pignata of La Stampa believed that the race would likely be won by an Italian or a Belgian rider, but stated that Dutchman Gerrie Knetemann and Spaniard Luis Ocaña were dark-horse candidates for the victory. In particular, young Italian Francesco Moser was expected to provide race favorite Merckx with "stiff competition." De Telegraaf writer Charles Taylor believed that José Manuel Fuente would be the best Spanish candidate for victory since Ocaña had recently recovered from sickness and injuries from crashes in different races. Taylor stated that there was no serious Dutch contender that could challenge the favorite, Merckx.

== Race summary ==
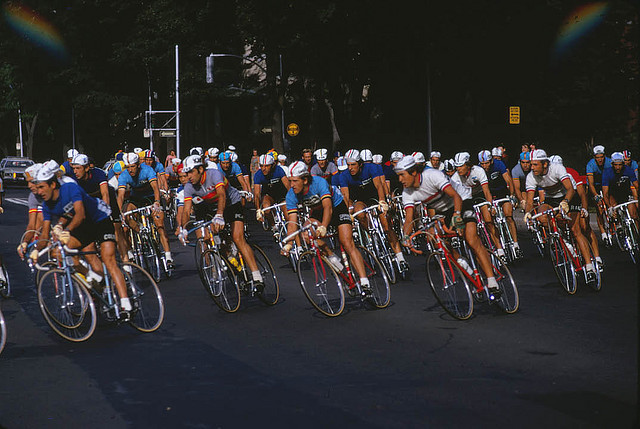
The peloton of the race making a turn on the course

The whole starting peloton stayed intact for the first lap which took only 18' 36" to complete. The first attack came from French rider Francis Campaner. He managed to earn a 37" advantage as he finished the second circuit and he increased that lead to 1' 19" at the conclusion of the third lap. Behind, the chasing group was led by Francesco Moser, Eddy Merckx, and Felice Gimondi. After the fourth lap, Campaner had gained thirty more seconds on the peloton. The gap between Campaner and the main field reached its maximum after the fifth lap — at 2' 21" — and was reduced to 1' 36" with the finishing of the sixth circuit.

The seventh lap saw a speed drop by the leading rider and the chasing peloton, allowing Campaner's advantage to increase back to 2' 21". The next two laps saw the gap fluctuate a little as the margin stayed around the two-minute mark. During the eleventh lap, Dutch rider Gerard Vianen attacked and managed to get within fifteen seconds of Campaner as the tenth lap ended, with the peloton 1' 27" behind. Vianen joined Campaner during the eleventh circuit as Merckx attacked from behind, along with Gerrie Knetemann. During the twelfth circuit, Vianen and Campaner were caught. Shortly after the re-absorption of the duo back into the peloton, Bernard Thévenet attacked and established a 40" advantage. Campaner retired from the race in the kilometers following being caught, while Vianen retired during the thirteenth lap.

Tino Conti and Freddy Maertens attacked on the thirteenth lap and managed to get a time gap of 25" on the peloton, but still trailed Thévenet by 1' 10" at the conclusion of the lap. Through the fifteenth lap, the duo was able to obtain over a minute lead on the peloton; however, Thévenet was still increasing his advantage over the race as a whole, with his lead reaching three minutes over the peloton. The field began to increase its tempo in the sixteenth lap and close the gap to the Conti-Maertens group, which prompted Maertens to wait up for the peloton, while Conti rode solo. On the seventeenth lap, a chase group with many race contenders – including Raymond Poulidor, Francesco Moser, Eddy Merckx, Maertens, and Herman Van Springel – formed and caught Conti. By the completion of the nineteenth lap, the chase group had shrunked to nine riders and Thévenet's lead had dropped to 2' 05". Gimondi dropped out of the race the same lap.

The penultimate circuit saw the chase group, led by Merckx, shrink to five members and Thévenet's lead dwindle to 35". The riders that remained in the chase group were Van Springel, Poulidor, Mariano Martínez, Merckx, and Giacinto Santambrogio. Van Springel was dropped by the Merckx group before Thévenet was caught and passed on the final climb of Mount Royal, with around 7 km (4.3 mi) remaining. The chase group led by Merckx broke into two groups of two, with Poulidor and Merckx riding together and Martinez and Santambrogio behind, together. The split was caused by a move made by Merckx with close to 5 km (3.1 mi) left. With two hundred meters remaining in the race, Merckx attacked and managed to open up a two-second gap between himself and Poulidor as he crossed the finish line to win the race.

== Result ==
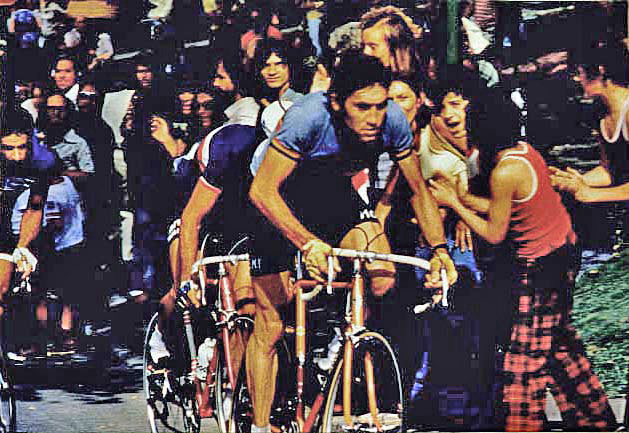
Eddy Merckx won his third men's road race at the UCI Road World Championships, equaling the record held by Alfredo Binda and Rik Van Steenbergen

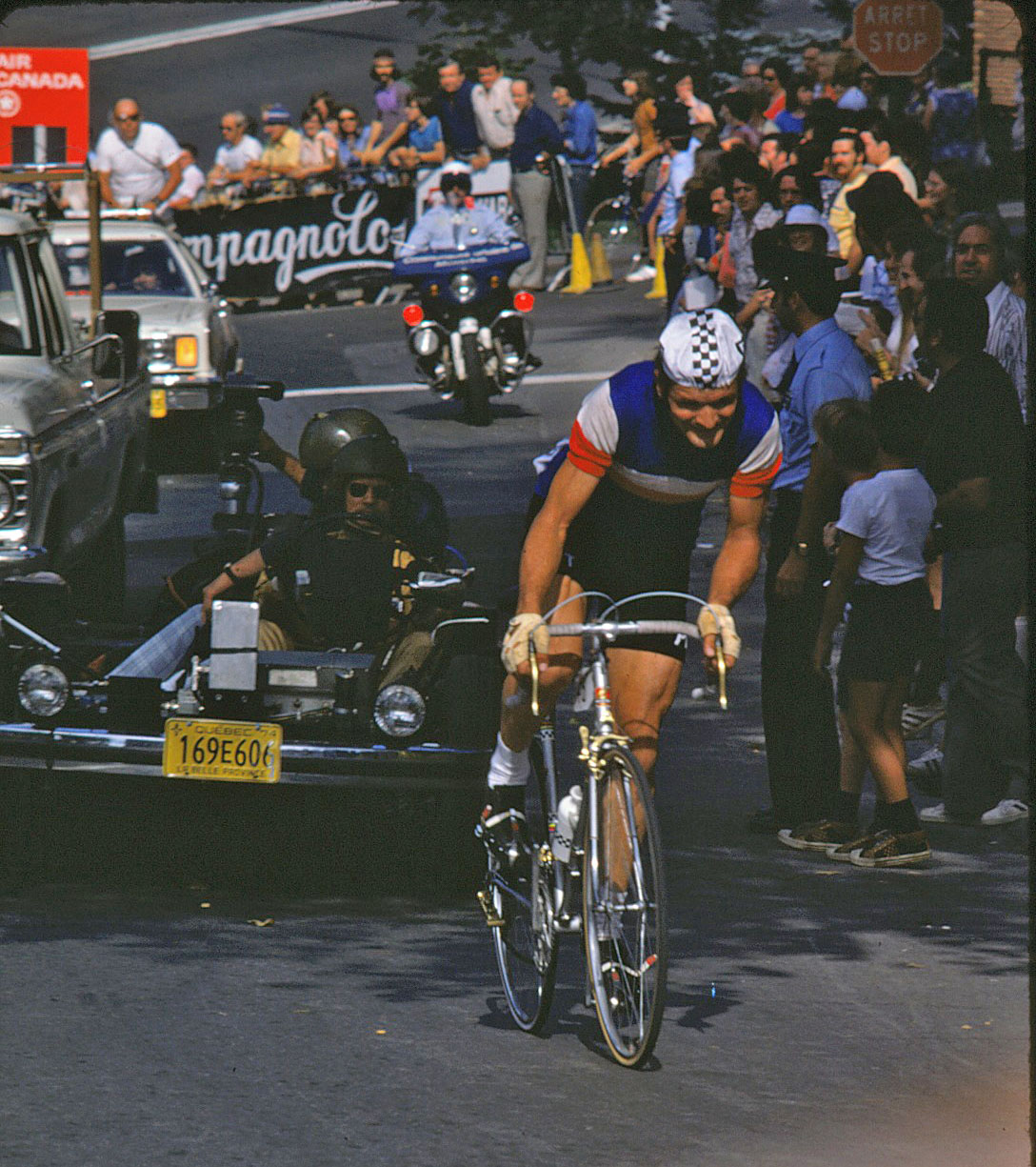
Bernard Thévenet shown climbing during his solo escape that lasted for over 100 km (62 mi).

Final placings (1–18)
| Rank | Rider | Country | Time |
|---|---|---|---|
| 1 | Eddy Merckx | Belgium | 6h 52' 22" |
| 1 | Raymond Poulidor | France | + 2" |
| 1 | Mariano Martínez | France | + 37" |
| 4 | Giacinto Santambrogio | Italy | + 39" |
| 5 | Bernard Thévenet | France | + 2' 10" |
| 6 | Herman Van Springel | Belgium | + 2' 19" |
| 7 | Francesco Moser | Italy | + 3' 11" |
| 8 | Domingo Perurena | Spain | + 3' 39" |
| 9 | Andrés Oliva | Spain | s.t. |
| 10 | Giovanni Battaglin | Italy | + 4' 18" |
| 11 | Martín Emilio Rodríguez | Colombia | + 10' 43" |
| 12 | Josef Fuchs | Switzerland | s.t. |
| 13 | Fabrizio Fabbri | Italy | + 11' 53" |
| 14 | Tino Tabak | Netherlands | s.t. |
| 15 | Gerben Karstens | Netherlands | + 14' 14" |
| 16 | Roland Salm | Switzerland | s.t. |
| 17 | Gösta Pettersson | Sweden | s.t. |
| 18 | Jürgen Tschan | West Germany | s.t. |

== Aftermath ==
With his victory in the race, Eddy Merckx became the first rider to achieve the Triple Crown of Cycling, which consists of winning two Grand Tour races and the men's road race at the UCI Road World Championships in a calendar year. Merckx had already won the Giro d'Italia and the Tour de France, both of which are Grand Tours, before the World Championships and winning the men's road race allowed him to complete the Triple Crown. This feat has since been matched by only one rider, Stephen Roche, who managed to complete the Triple Crown in the 1987 season. This was also Merckx's third world title, which made him the third rider to ever be world champion three times, after Alfredo Binda and Rik Van Steenbergen. This was Merckx's final world championship victory and also the last season that he won a Grand Tour. On February 22, 1975, Merckx gave the bike that he used during the race to Pope Paul VI while visiting Vatican City.

Following the victory, Merckx told the press that he felt lucky that Bernard Thévenet was weakened from his efforts on the road. In regards to his sprint against Raymond Poulidor, Merckx stated that he feared only an external setback because "In the sprint [he] could not lose. Despite Thévenet missing out on a medal, Raymond Poulidor stated that the French were content with the results and worked great together. Reflecting on the race, De Telegraaf writer Charles Taylor stated he felt this race was "one of the finest and most sensational bicycle races in recent years." Taylor noted a poor showing by the Dutch riders, citing that only two managed to finish the race. Taylor believed that the Dutch participants competed in too many criteriums between the end of the Tour de France and the start of the World Championships, which led to them not having fresh enough legs for the race. De Telegraaf also reported that there were over a 100,000 spectators for the men's road race. Francesco Moser was found to have had a disappointing performance as he placed seventh on the day, in part because he was suffering from a leg cramp.
