= 1974 Gent–Wevelgem =

Race details
- Dates: 9 April 1974
- Stages: 1
- Distance: 244 km (152 mi)
- Winning time: 5h 30′ 00"

Results
	Winner	Barry Hoban (GBR)	(Gan–Mercier–Hutchinson)
	Second	Eddy Merckx (BEL)	(Molteni)
	Third	Roger De Vlaeminck (BEL)	(Brooklyn)

The 1974 Gent–Wevelgem was a one-day cycling classic that took place in Belgium on 9 April 1974. It was the 36th edition of the Gent–Wevelgem race. It was won by the Gan–Mercier–Hutchinson team's Barry Hoban in a thirteen-rider bunch sprint.

== Results ==
Results (1–10)
Rank	Rider	Team	Time
1	Barry Hoban (GBR)	Gan–Mercier–Hutchinson	5h 30′ 00"
2	Eddy Merckx (BEL)	Molteni	+ 0"
3	Roger De Vlaeminck (BEL)	Brooklyn	+ 0"
4	Alain Santy (FRA)	Gan–Mercier–Hutchinson	+ 0"
5	Eric Leman (BEL)	MIC–Ludo–de Gribaldy	+ 0"
6	Freddy Maertens (BEL)	Carpenter–Confortluxe–Flandria	+ 0"
7	Walter Planckaert (BEL)	Watney–Maes Pils	+ 0"
8	Walter Godefroot (BEL)	Carpenter–Confortluxe–Flandria	+ 0"
9	Frans Verbeeck (BEL)	Watney–Maes Pils	+ 0"
10	Roger Swerts (BEL)	IJsboerke–Colner	+ 0"
