= Mariano Martínez (cyclist) =

French cyclist (born 1948)

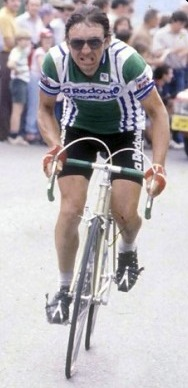

Personal information
- Full name: Mariano Martínez
- Born: 20 September 1948 (age 78) Burgos, Spain

Cycling career
- Sport: Cycling
- Discipline: Road
- Role: Rider
- Rider type: Climber

Professional teams
- 1971: Hoover-De Gribaldy
- 1972: Van Cauter-Magniflex-de Gribaldy
- 1973: Gan-Mercier
- 1974: Sonolor-Gitane
- 1975: Gitane-Campagnolo
- 1976: Lejeune-BP
- 1977: Flandria-Velda
- 1978: Jobo-Spidel
- 1979–1981: La Redoute-Motobécane
- 1982: Individual

Major wins
- Grand Tours Tour de France Mountains classification (1978) 2 individual stages (1978, 1980)
Medal record
Men's road bicycle racing
Representing France
World Championships
Bronze medal – third place	1974 Montréal	Elite Men's Road Race

Mariano Martínez (born 20 September 1948) is a Spanish-French former professional road racing cyclist. He won the King of the Mountains competition in 1978 Tour de France. Born in Spain, Martínez became a naturalized French citizen in 1963. He is the father of former racing cyclists Miguel and Yannick Martinez, the brother of Martin, and the grandfather of Lenny Martinez.

== Major results ==
1965
1st Road race, National Junior Road Championships
1971
7th Züri-Metzgete
8th GP du canton d'Argovie
9th Overall Étoile des Espoirs
10th Grand Prix des Nations
1972
4th Overall Critérium du Dauphiné Libéré
4th Overall Tour de Romandie
6th Overall Tour de France
1973
3rd Overall Grand Prix du Midi Libre
4th Overall Tour de Romandie
1974
1st Stage 4 Grand Prix du Midi Libre
3rd Road race, UCI Road World Championships
6th Overall Paris–Nice
8th Overall Tour de France
9th Overall Critérium du Dauphiné Libéré
1975
4th Overall Tour de l'Aude
5th Overall Tour du Limousin
1976
10th Rund um den Henninger Turm
1977
1st Stage 5 Étoile de Bessèges
10th Overall Setmana Catalana de Ciclisme
1978
1st Stage 4 Tour du Limousin
2nd Overall Critérium du Dauphiné Libéré

1st Mountains classification

2nd Overall Tour du Vaucluse

1st Stage 1a

3rd Overall Circuit de la Sarthe

1st Stage 1

4th Overall Tour de Romandie
5th Grand Prix de Mauléon-Moulins
6th Overall Tour de Suisse

1st Points classification
1st Mountains classification

7th Overall Critérium National de la Route
10th Overall Tour de France

1st Mountains classification
1st Stage 11

1979
3rd Road race, National Road Championships
6th Overall Grand Prix du Midi Libre
10th Overall Critérium du Dauphiné Libéré
10th Grand Prix de Rennes
1980
1st Stage 17 Tour de France
1st Stage 3a Tour du Limousin
9th Rund um den Henninger Turm
1981
1st Stage 2 Grand Prix du Midi Libre
2nd Subida a Arrate
