= Henk Poppe =

Dutch cyclist

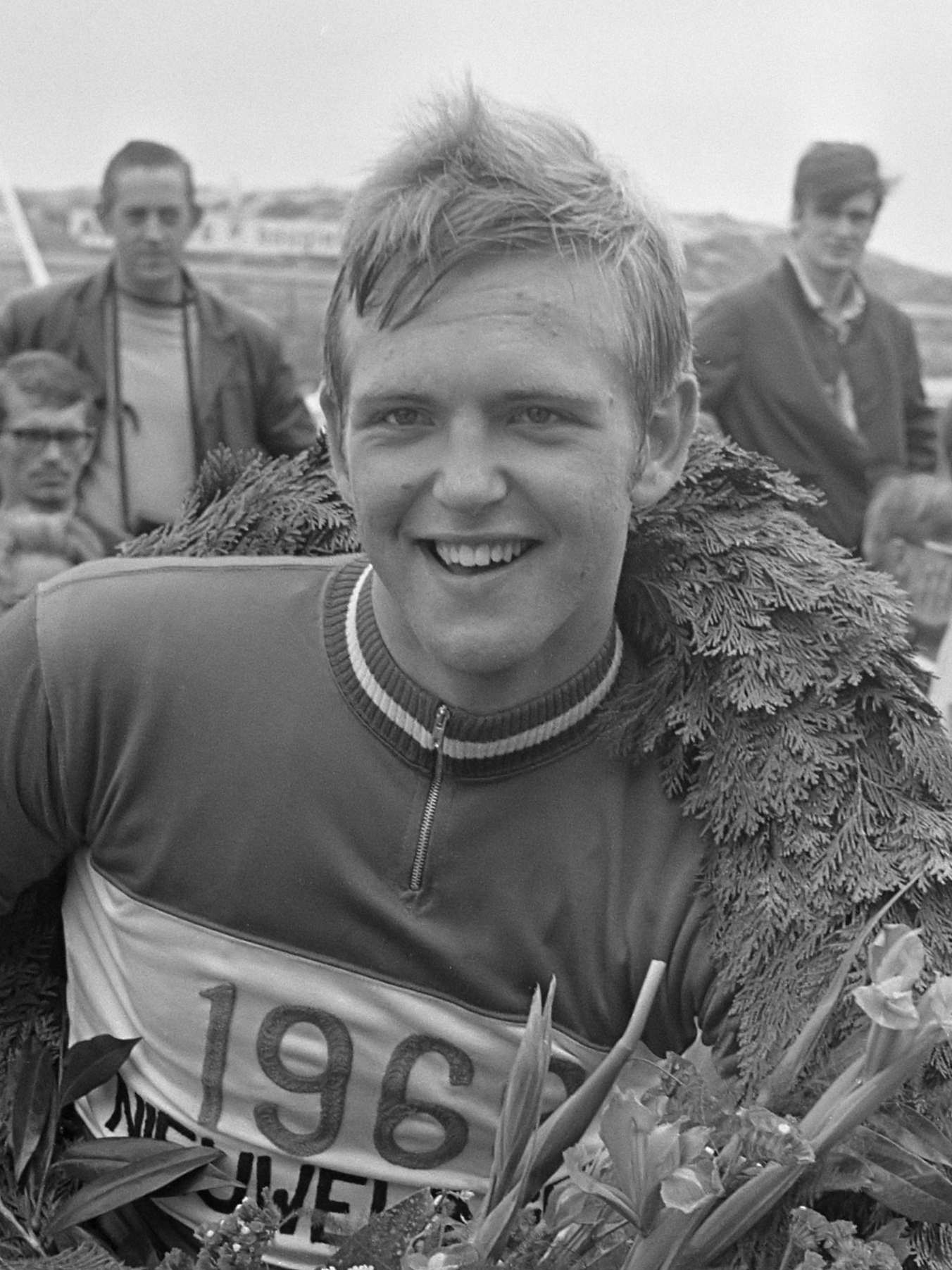

Personal information
- Full name: Henk Poppe
- Born: 12 July 1952 (age 74) Nijverdal, the Netherlands

Cycling career
- Sport: Cycling
- Current team: Retired
- Discipline: Road
- Role: Rider

Major wins
- 1 stage 1974 Tour de France

Henk Poppe (born 12 July 1952) was a Dutch professional road bicycle racer. Poppe won a stage in the 1974 Tour de France.

Poppe was born in Nijverdal, Overijssel.

== Major results ==
1969
Netherlands National Novice Road Race Championship
1971
Ronde van Limburg
1972
Netherlands National Militaries Road Race Championship
1974
Belsele
Tour de France:

Winner stage 2
