= Gianni Di Lorenzo =

Italian cyclist

Personal information
- Born: 20 April 1948 (age 78)

Cycling career
- Sport: Cycling
- Role: Rider

Gianni Di Lorenzo (born 20 April 1948) is an Italian racing cyclist. He rode in the 1974 Tour de France.
