= Ercole Gualazzini =

Italian cyclist

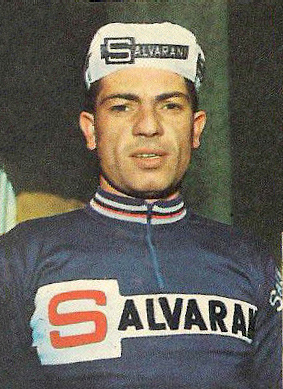

Personal information
- Full name: Ercole Gualazzini
- Born: 22 June 1944 (age 82) San Secondo Parmense, Italy

Cycling career
- Sport: Cycling
- Discipline: Road
- Role: Rider

Major wins
- 2 stages Tour de France

Ercole Gualazzini (born 22 June 1944) is a retired Italian professional road bicycle racer. Gualazzini won stages in all the Grand Tours.

== Major results ==
1969
Vuelta a España:

Winner stage 18A

1970
Tour d'Indre-et-Loire
1971
Giro d'Italia:

Winner stage 3

1972
Tour de France:

Winner stage 3A

1974
Tour de France:

Winner stage 1

1977
Sassari — Cagliari
