= Jean-Luc Molinéris =

French cyclist

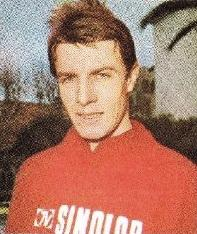
- Jean-Luc Molinéris

Personal information
- Full name: Jean-Luc Molinéris
- Born: 25 August 1950 (age 76) Grenoble, France

Cycling career
- Sport: Cycling
- Current team: Retired
- Discipline: Road
- Role: Rider

Major wins
- 1 stage 1974 Tour de France

Jean-Luc Molinéris (born 25 August 1950 in Grenoble) was a French professional road bicycle racer. Molinéris is the son of cyclist Pierre Molinéris. In 1974, Molinéris won a stage in the 1974 Tour de France. In 1976, he won Paris–Bourges.

== Major results ==
1971
Étoile de Bessèges
1972
Étoile de Bessèges
1974
Ambert
Concarneau
Tour de France:

Winner stage 6A

1976
GP de Peymeinade
Paris–Bourges
