= Barry Hoban =

English cyclist (1940–2025)

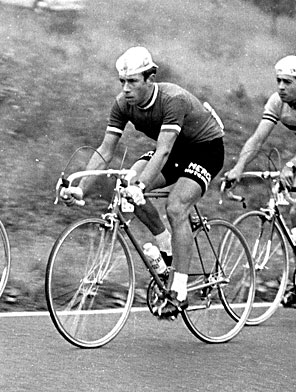
- Hoban at the 1966 UCI Road World Championships

Personal information
- Full name: Barry Hoban
- Nickname: Uncle Barry
- Born: 5 February 1940 Wakefield, West Riding of Yorkshire, England
- Died: 19 April 2025 (aged 85)

Cycling career
- Sport: Cycling
- Discipline: Road
- Role: Rider

Major wins
- Grand Tours Tour de France 8 individual stages (1967, 1968, 1969, 1973, 1974, 1975) Vuelta a España 2 individual stages (1964) One-day races and Classics Gent–Wevelgem (1974)

Barry Hoban (5 February 1940 – 19 April 2025) was an English professional cyclist who rode during the late 1960s and early 1970s. He formerly held the record for the most stage wins in the Tour de France by a British rider, winning eight between 1967 and 1975. He was also the first Briton to win two consecutive stages of the Tour (a feat matched by Mark Cavendish in 2008, twice in 2009 and once in 2010, and by Geraint Thomas in 2018).

== Early career ==
Hoban started cycle racing in 1955, joining Calder Clarion, and by the end of the year was competing against Tom Simpson in individual time trials. Two years later, he was fourth in the British League of Racing Cyclists hill-climb (the senior title being won by Simpson). Despite his early prowess as a climber, Hoban later established himself as one of Europe's best sprinters.

Inspired by the European successes of fellow Yorkshireman Brian Robinson and of Simpson, Hoban went to France in 1962, turned professional two years later, and stayed abroad for another 16 years. He rode for Mercier-Hutchinson-BP where his team leader was Raymond Poulidor who is famous for coming second three times in the Tour de France but never winning. Hoban was single then and used to come back to Wakefield for the winter with a case full of used shorts/jerseys etc. and sell them to the local riders (it wasn't easy then to get good quality kit and what was available was expensive). Dozens of riders in the BCF West Yorks division had a pair of shorts with Mercier Hutchinson embroidered on the legs. Back then, the best frames were hand-built British ones and Maurice Woodrup, a Leeds frame builder, would have a new frame sprayed Mercier pink waiting for him each year. He would take it back to have Mercier transfers attached.

In the 1967 Tour de France, after the death of Tom Simpson, Hoban was allowed to win the next stage. Two years later, in 1969, Hoban married Simpson's widow, with whom he has a daughter Daniella, and two stepdaughters Jane and Joanne.

== Other career highlights ==
Hoban competed in the team pursuit at the 1960 Summer Olympics.

Hoban also won two stages of the 1964 Vuelta a España and the 1974 Gent–Wevelgem, where he finished ahead of Eddy Merckx and Roger De Vlaeminck. In the ’Monument’ Classics, his best performances were third places in Liège–Bastogne–Liège (1969) and Paris–Roubaix (1972). Towards the end of a career spent largely in mainland Europe, Hoban occasionally returned to the UK to race; he won the London-Bradford race and was second in the British professional road-race championship in 1979, and he won the Grand Prix of Manchester in 1980.

At least one bicycle was made with his name on it, including Barry Hoban–badged frames made by Coventry Cycles (later trading as Coventry Eagle). This is a common practice of retired racing cyclists. Hoban lived in Mid-Wales after moving there to work with the factory that built his frames.

In 2009, he was inducted into the British Cycling Hall of Fame.

== Death ==
Hoban died on 19 April 2025, at the age of 85.

== Major results ==
1963
10th Overall Paris–Luxembourg
1964 (3 pro wins)
Vuelta a España

1st Stages 12 & 13

1st Stage 3 Grand Prix du Midi Libre
2nd Circuit des Frontières
3rd Manx Premier Trophy
5th Boucles Roquevairoises
8th Paris–Camembert
9th Genoa–Nice
1966 (2)
1st Rund um den Henninger Turm
3rd Overall Tour de l'Oise

1st Stage 2a

5th Overall Four Days of Dunkirk
1967 (1)
1st Stage 14 Tour de France
2nd Paris–Tours
4th GP Stad Vilvoorde
5th Tour of Flanders
7th Dwars door België
1968 (1)
1st Stage 19 Tour de France
2nd Overall Tour de l'Oise
2nd Grand Prix de Denain
6th Grand Prix d'Isbergues
9th GP Fayt-le-Franc
10th Liège–Bastogne–Liège
1969 (3)
Tour de France

1st Stages 18 & 19

1st Stage 1b Four Days of Dunkirk
3rd Liège–Bastogne–Liège
7th Tour of Flanders
9th Harelbeke–Antwerp–Harelbeke
9th Ronde van Limburg
1970 (2)
1st Manx Premier Trophy
2nd Circuit des Frontières
5th Grand Prix de Fourmies
6th Bordeaux–Paris
7th Overall Four Days of Dunkirk

1st Stage 3

7th De Kustpijl
1971 (2)
1st Grand Prix de Fourmies
1st Stage 5b Four Days of Dunkirk
2nd Overall Tour de l'Oise
6th Omloop der Beide Vlaanderen
10th Overall Tour de Luxembourg
10th Omloop van het Leiedal
1972
3rd Overall Tour de Luxembourg
3rd Paris–Roubaix
8th Paris–Bourges
9th Paris–Tours
9th Omloop der Beide Vlaanderen
10th Overall Tour du Nord
1973 (2)
Tour de France

1st Stages 11 & 19

10th Overall Setmana Catalana de Ciclisme
1974 (8)
1st Gent–Wevelgem
1st Paris–Bourges
1st Stage 13 Tour de France
1st Stage 2a Tour d'Indre-et-Loire
2nd Overall Grand Prix du Midi Libre

1st Points classification
1st Stages 1b & 3

2nd Overall Tour de l'Aude

1st Stage 3

4th Züri-Metzgete
10th Overall Four Days of Dunkirk
1975 (1)
1st Stage 8 Tour de France
10th Overall Four Days of Dunkirk
1978 (1)
2nd Grand Prix Pino Cerami
4th GP Stad Vilvoorde
5th Overall Four Days of Dunkirk

1st Stage 5b

6th Paris–Camembert
8th Overall Étoile des Espoirs
10th Overall Tour de l'Oise
1979 (1)
1st London–Bradford
2nd Road race, National Road Championships
1980
8th Nokere Koerse

== Tour de France stage wins ==
- 1967 - Stage 14 - Carpentras – Sète – Hoban was allowed to win after the death of Tom Simpson on the previous stage.
- 1968 - Stage 19 - Grenoble – Sallanches – a rarity in that Hoban won a mountain stage, not a sprint.
- 1969 - Stage 18 - Mourenx – Bordeaux
- 1969 - Stage 19 - Bordeaux - Brive-la-Gaillarde – the first Briton to win successive stages of the Tour.
- 1973 – Stage 11 - Montpellier - Argelès-sur-Mer
- 1973 - Stage 19 - Bourges – Versaille
- 1974 - Stage 13 - Avignon – Montpellier
- 1975 - Stage 8 - Angoulême - Bordeaux
