= Étoile de Bessèges =

French multi-day road cycling race

Race details
- Date: Early February
- Region: Gard department, Occitanie
- English name: Star of Bessèges
- Local name: Étoile de Bessèges (in French)
- Discipline: Road
- Competition: UCI Europe Tour
- Type: Stage race
- Web site: www.etoiledebesseges.com

History
- First edition: 1971
- Editions: 56 (as of 2026)
- First winner: Jean-Luc Molinéris (FRA)
- Most wins: Jean-Luc Molinéris (FRA); Jo Planckaert (BEL); Jérôme Coppel (FRA) (2 wins)
- Most recent: Ewen Costiou (FRA)

The Étoile de Bessèges (English: Star of Bessèges) is an early-season five-day road bicycle racing stage race held annually around Bessèges, in the Gard department of the Languedoc-Roussillon region of France. First organized in 1971 as a one-day race, it became a stage race run over five days in 1974. Since 2005, it is on the calendar of the UCI Europe Tour as a 2.1 event and features as the earliest stage races of the European season.

The Étoile de Bessèges is the first of several stage races held in the hilly South of France in February, preceding La Méditerranéenne, the Tour du Haut Var and the Tour La Provence. These early-season races are competed mainly by French teams and are considered preparations for Paris–Nice, the first European World Tour stage race in March.

== Winners ==
Year	Country	Rider	Team
1971	France	Jean-Luc Molinéris	Sonolor–Lejeune
1972	France	Jean-Luc Molinéris	Sonolor
1973	France	Robert Mintkiewicz	Sonolor
1974	France	Jacques Esclassan	Peugeot–BP–Michelin
1975	France	Patrick Béon	Peugeot–BP–Michelin
1976	France	Maurice Le Guilloux	Gan–Mercier
1977	Belgium	Willy Planckaert	Maes–Mini Flat
1978	West Germany	Dietrich Thurau	IJsboerke–Gios
1979	France	Jacques Michaud	Flandria–Ça va seul
1980	Belgium	Franky De Gendt	TI–Raleigh
1981	Netherlands	Jan Raas	TI–Raleigh
1982	Netherlands	Cees Priem	TI–Raleigh
1983	Netherlands	Bert Oosterbosch	TI–Raleigh
1984	Belgium	Eddy Planckaert	Panasonic
1985	Belgium	Guy Nulens	Panasonic
1986	Switzerland	Niki Rüttimann	La Vie Claire
1987	France	Ronan Pensec	Z–Peugeot
1988	Netherlands	Adri van der Poel	PDM–Concorde
1989	Belgium	Etienne De Wilde	Histor–Sigma
1990	Netherlands	Frans Maassen	Buckler
1991	Netherlands	Ad Wijnands	Team Telekom
1992	Switzerland	Beat Zberg	Helvetia
1993	France	Armand de Las Cuevas	Banesto
1994	Netherlands	Jean-Paul van Poppel	Festina–Lotus
1995	Ukraine	Sergei Oetsjakov	Polti–Granarolo–Santini
1996	Czech Republic	Ján Svorada	Panaria–Vinavil
1997	France	Patrice Halgand	Festina–Lotus
1998	Belgium	Jo Planckaert	Lotto–Mobistar
1999	France	David Lefèvre	Casino–Ag2r Prévoyance
2000	Belgium	Jo Planckaert	Cofidis
2001	Belgium	Niko Eeckhout	Lotto–Adecco
2002	Australia	Robbie McEwen	Lotto–Adecco
2003	Italy	Fabio Baldato	Alessio
2004	France	Laurent Brochard	AG2R Prévoyance
2005	France	Freddy Bichot	Française des Jeux
2006	Belgium	Frederik Willems	Chocolade Jacques
2007	Belgium	Nick Nuyens	Cofidis
2008	Russia	Iouri Trofimov	Bouygues Télécom
2009	France	Thomas Voeckler	Bbox Bouygues Telecom
2010	France	Samuel Dumoulin	Cofidis
2011	France	Anthony Ravard	Ag2r–La Mondiale
2012	France	Jérôme Coppel	Saur–Sojasun
2013	France	Jonathan Hivert	Sojasun
2014	Sweden	Tobias Ludvigsson	Giant–Shimano
2015	Luxembourg	Bob Jungels	Trek Factory Racing
2016	France	Jérôme Coppel	IAM Cycling
2017	France	Lilian Calmejane	Direct Énergie
2018	France	Tony Gallopin	AG2R La Mondiale
2019	France	Christophe Laporte	Cofidis
2020	France	Benoît Cosnefroy	AG2R La Mondiale
2021	Belgium	Tim Wellens	Lotto–Soudal
2022	France	Benjamin Thomas	Cofidis
2023	United States	Neilson Powless	EF Education–EasyPost
2024	Denmark	Mads Pedersen	Lidl–Trek
2025	France	Kévin Vauquelin	Arkéa–B&B Hotels
2026	France	Ewen Costiou	Groupama–FDJ United
