= Gonzalo Aja =

Spanish cyclist

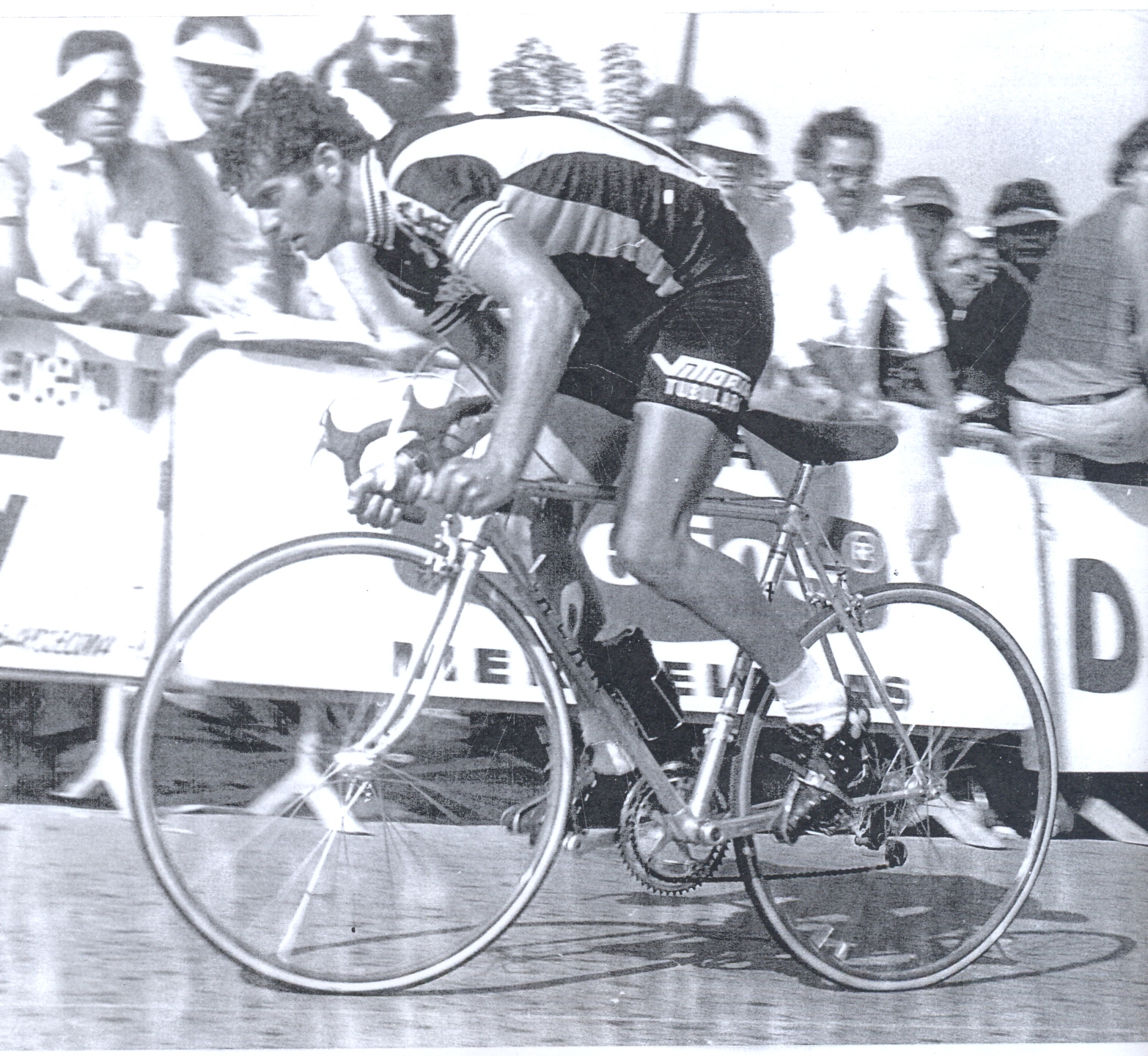

Personal information
- Full name: Gonzalo Aja Barquín
- Born: 13 June 1946 (age 80) Matienzo, Spain

Cycling career
- Sport: Cycling
- Current team: Retired
- Discipline: Road
- Role: Rider
- Rider type: Climber

Professional teams
- 1970–1972: Karpy
- 1973–1975: Kas–Kaskol
- 1976: Teka
- 1977: Teka–Campagnolo
- 1978–1979: Novostil–Helios

Major wins
- 1971 1 Vuelta a Cantabria GC, 1972 1 Subida a Arrate GC, 1967 1 Vuelta a Valenciana GC, 1 Vuelta Ciclista a Levante GC

Gonzalo Aja Barquín (Matienzo, Cantabria, 13 June 1946) is a Spanish former professional road bicycle racer. In the 1974 Tour de France, Aja was the first cyclist on the Col du Tourmalet and the Mont Ventoux, and finished on the 5th place of the general classification.

== Honors ==
1971
Vuelta a Cantabria
1972
Subida a Arrate
1974
Clásica de Santoña
Tour de France:

5th place overall classification

1976
Volta a la Comunitat Valenciana
1977
Clásica de Santoña
