= Jacques Botherel =

French cyclist

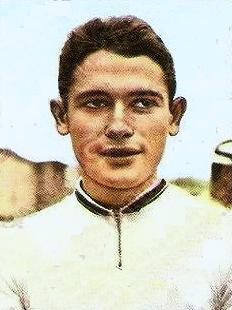

Personal information
- Born: 1 December 1946 (age 79)

Cycling career
- Sport: Cycling
- Role: Rider

Jacques Botherel (born 1 December 1946) is a French racing cyclist. He rode in the 1971 Tour de France.
