= Alain Santy =

French cyclist (born 1949)

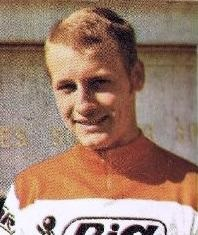

Personal information
- Born: August 28, 1949 (age 77) Lompret

Cycling career
- Sport: Cycling
- Current team: Retired
- Discipline: Road
- Role: Rider

Professional teams
- 1970-1973: Bic
- 1974: Mercier
- 1975-1976: Gitane

Major wins
- Critérium du Dauphiné (1974)

Alain Santy (born August 28, 1949) is a former French professional cyclist.

== Biography ==
He is the brother of Guy Santy, who was also a professional cyclist. Santy was professional from 1970 to 1976. He had 10 wins as a professional. His most important victory was the first place of the Critérium du Dauphiné in 1974.

== Major results ==
1972
1st Criterium d'Aix-en-Provence
1973
1st Overall Tour de Picardie
1974
1st Paris–Camembert
1st Overall Critérium du Dauphiné

1st Stage 4

1975
1st Stages 2 & 4 Étoile de Bessèges
1st Le Samyn

== Results in the Tour de France ==
- 1972: DNF
- 1973: 31st
- 1974: 9th
- 1975: DNF
