= Francis Campaner =

French cyclist (1946–2026)

Personal information
- Born: 1 February 1946 Saint-Germain-de-la-Rivière, France
- Died: 14 August 2026 (aged 80)

Cycling career
- Sport: Cycling
- Discipline: Road
- Role: Rider

Major wins
- 1 stage 1974 Tour de France

Francis Campaner (1 February 1946 – 14 August 2026) was a French professional road bicycle racer.

Campaner died on 14 August 2026, at the age of 80.

== Major results ==
1967
Aigueperse
Allassac
Bannalec
Beaulac-Bernos
La Couronne
Laguirande
GP de Fréjus
1968
Lubersac
1969
Castillones
Mont-de-Marsan
Sizun
GP Petit Varois
Saint-Médard de Guizières
1972
La Bastide d'Armagnac
1974
Saussignac
Tour de France:

Winner stage 19A

1975
Tour du Limousin
Ambarès
1978
Pléaux
