= Piet van Katwijk =

Dutch cyclist (1950–2025)

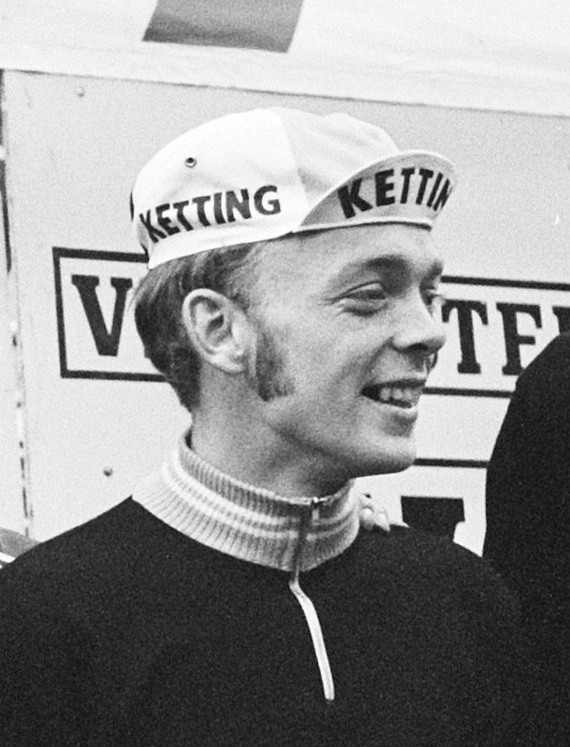
- Van Katwijk in 1971

Personal information
- Born: 27 February 1950 Oploo, Netherlands
- Died: 24 February 2025 (aged 74)

Sport
- Sport: Cycling

Achievements and titles
- Olympic finals: 1972

Pieter Gerardus van Katwijk (27 February 1950 – 24 February 2025) was a Dutch cyclist who was active between 1969 and 1983. He competed at the 1972 Summer Olympics and finished in eleventh place in the road race. He won the Milk Race (1973) and Acht van Chaam (1974) as well as several stages of the Olympia's Tour (1970, 1971, 1972), Tour de Suisse (1976), Tour of Belgium (1976), Ronde van Nederland (1977), and Tour de Luxembourg (1977).

Van Katwijk died on 24 February 2025, three days before his 75th birthday. His brothers Jan and Fons and nephew Alain were also professional cyclists.

== See also ==
- List of Dutch Olympic cyclists
