= List of teams and cyclists in the 1963 Tour de France =

List of cyclists

The 1963 Tour de France started with 130 cyclists, divided into 13 teams:

- VC XII–Saint-Raphaël–Géminiani–Dunlop
- Mercier–BP–Hutchinson
- Faema–Flandria
- Wiel's–Groene Leeuw
- Margnat–Paloma–Motul–Dunlop
- Carpano
- Pelforth–Sauvage–Lejeune–Wolber
- Ferrys
- GBC–Libertas
- IBAC–Molteni
- Kas
- Peugeot–BP–Englebert
- Solo–Terrot–Englebert

The IBAC-Molteni team was a combination of five cyclists from IBAC and five from Molteni, each wearing their own sponsor's jerseys. The main favourite before the race was Jacques Anquetil, at that moment already a three-time winner of the Tour, including the previous two editions. Anquetil had shown good form before the Tour, as he won Paris–Nice, the Dauphiné Libéré, the Critérium National and the 1961 Vuelta a España. Anquetil was not sure if he would ride the Tour until a few days before the start; he had been infected by a tapeworm, and was advised not to start. Anquetil had chosen to ride races with tough climbs, to prepare for the 1963 Tour de France. The major competitor was thought to be Raymond Poulidor, who had shown his capabilities in the 1962 Tour de France.

== Start list ==
=== By team ===
VC XII–Saint-Raphaël–Géminiani–Dunlop
No.	Rider	Pos.
1	Jacques Anquetil (FRA)	1
2	Jean Stablinski (FRA)	DNF
3	Seamus Elliott (IRL)	61
4	Pierre Everaert (FRA)	63
5	Albertus Geldermans (NED)	24
6	Guy Ignolin (FRA)	37
7	Jean-Claude Lebaube (FRA)	4
8	Anatole Novak (FRA)	59
9	Louis Rostollan (FRA)	DNF
10	Gérard Thiélin (FRA)	31

Mercier–BP–Hutchinson
No.	Rider	Pos.
11	Pierre Beuffeuil (FRA)	47
12	Robert Cazala (FRA)	30
13	Jean Gainche (FRA)	20
14	Alfons Hellemans (BEL)	60
15	Frans Melckenbeeck (BEL)	DNF
16	Jean Milesi (FRA)	68
17	Raymond Poulidor (FRA)	8
18	Simon Le Borgne (FRA)	DNF
19	Victor Van Schil (BEL)	22
20	August Verhaegen (BEL)	74

Faema–Flandria
No.	Rider	Pos.
21	Willy Bocklant (BEL)	DNF
22	Frans Brands (BEL)	25
23	Armand Desmet (BEL)	5
24	Noël Foré (BEL)	DNF
25	Antonio Gómez del Moral (ESP)	29
26	Marcel Ongenae (BEL)	58
27	Jef Planckaert (BEL)	DNF
28	Clément Roman (BEL)	DNF
29	Angelino Soler (ESP)	6
30	Antonio Suárez (ESP)	43

Wiel's–Groene Leeuw
No.	Rider	Pos.
31	Benoni Beheyt (BEL)	49
32	Gilbert Desmet (BEL)	DNF
33	Gilbert De Smet (BEL)	44
34	Daniel Doom (BEL)	DNF
35	Hans Junkermann (FRG)	9
36	André Messelis (BEL)	DNF
37	Yvo Molenaers (BEL)	DNF
38	Eddy Pauwels (BEL)	13
39	Dieter Puschel (FRG)	15
40	René Van Meenen (BEL)	DNF

Margnat–Paloma–Motul–Dunlop
No.	Rider	Pos.
41	Federico Bahamontes (ESP)	2
42	Juan Campillo (ESP)	46
43	André Darrigade (FRA)	DNF
44	Jean Dotto (FRA)	28
45	Jean Dupont (FRA)	DNF
46	Jean Graczyk (FRA)	72
47	Claude Mattio (FRA)	52
48	Luis Otaño (ESP)	38
49	Joseph Thomin (FRA)	62
50	Joseph Velly (FRA)	DNF

Carpano
No.	Rider	Pos.
51	Carlo Azzini (ITA)	DNF
52	Antonio Bailetti (ITA)	55
53	Franco Balmamion (ITA)	DNF
54	Germano Barale (ITA)	DNF
55	Vendramino Bariviera (ITA)	DNF
56	Kurt Gimmi (SUI)	DNF
57	Ottavio Cogliati (ITA)	DNF
58	Giancarlo Gentina (ITA)	DNF
59	Loris Guernieri (ITA)	53
60	Giuseppe Sartore (ITA)	DNF

Pelforth–Sauvage–Lejeune–Wolber
No.	Rider	Pos.
61	Henry Anglade (FRA)	11
62	Guy Epaud (FRA)	48
63	Dick Enthoven (NED)	34
64	André Foucher (FRA)	57
65	Georges Groussard (FRA)	51
66	Joseph Groussard (FRA)	64
67	Jan Janssen (NED)	DNF
68	Roland Lacombe (FRA)	DNF
69	François Mahé (FRA)	19
70	Alan Ramsbottom (GBR)	16

Ferrys
No.	Rider	Pos.
71	Antonio Bertrán (ESP)	35
72	Rogelio Hernández (ESP)	27
73	Antonio Karmany (ESP)	54
74	Fernando Manzaneque (ESP)	12
75	Esteban Martín (ESP)	32
76	Gabriel Mas (ESP)	40
77	José Pérez Francés (ESP)	3
78	Raúl Rey (ESP)	71
79	Julio San Emeterio (ESP)	75
80	Emilio Cruz (ESP)	41

GBC–Libertas
No.	Rider	Pos.
81	Frans Aerenhouts (BEL)	42
82	Roger Baens (BEL)	DNF
83	Willy Derboven (BEL)	76
84	Ludo Janssens (BEL)	39
85	Willy Schroeders (BEL)	DNF
86	Edgard Sorgeloos (BEL)	DNF
87	Martin Van Geneugden (BEL)	56
88	Rik Van Looy (BEL)	10
89	Guillaume Van Tongerloo (BEL)	45
90	Huub Zilverberg (NED)	DNF

IBAC–Molteni
No.	Rider	Pos.
91	Graziano Battistini (ITA)	18
92	Danilo Ferrari (ITA)	DNF
93	Renzo Fontona (ITA)	7
94	Ernesto Minetto (ITA)	DNF
95	Angel Ottaviani (ITA)	DNF
96	Giacomo Fornoni (ITA)	DNF
97	Guido Carlesi (ITA)	DNF
98	Peppino Dante (ITA)	DNF
99	Roberto Falaschi (ITA)	DNF
100	Nello Velucchi (ITA)	DNF

KAS–Kaskol
No.	Rider	Pos.
101	Antonio Barrutia (ESP)	DNF
102	Carlos Echeverría (ESP)	DNF
103	Sebastián Elorza (ESP)	36
104	Francisco Gabica (ESP)	14
105	José María López Caño (ESP)	DNF
106	Miguel Pacheco (ESP)	17
107	Manuel Martín Piñera (ESP)	DNF
108	Valentín Uriona (ESP)	50
109	Juan Sánchez (ESP)	DNF
110	Eusebio Vélez (ESP)	DNF

Peugeot–BP–Englebert
No.	Rider	Pos.
111	Ferdinand Bracke (BEL)	21
112	Pino Cerami (BEL)	DNF
113	Emile Daems (BEL)	67
114	Charly Gaul (LUX)	DNF
115	Jos Hoevenaers (BEL)	23
116	Raymond Impanis (BEL)	66
117	Jean Simon (BEL)	70
118	Henri Duez (FRA)	26
119	Willy Vannitsen (BEL)	DNF
120	Rolf Wolfshohl (FRG)	DNF

Solo–Terrot–Englebert
No.	Rider	Pos.
121	Jaak De Boever (BEL)	DNF
122	Roger De Breuker (BEL)	73
123	Arthur Decabooter (BEL)	DNF
124	Henri De Wolf (BEL)	33
125	Marcel Janssens (BEL)	DNF
126	Robert Lelangue (BEL)	69
127	Louis Proost (BEL)	65
128	Marcel Seynaeve (BEL)	DNF
129	Michel Van Aerde (BEL)	DNF
130	Joseph Wouters (BEL)	DNF

=== By rider ===
Legend
No.	Starting number worn by the rider during the Tour
Pos.	Position in the general classification
DNF	Denotes a rider who did not finish

No.	Name	Nationality	Team	Pos.	Ref
1	Jacques Anquetil	France	VC XII–Saint-Raphaël–Géminiani–Dunlop	1	
2	Jean Stablinski	France	VC XII–Saint-Raphaël–Géminiani–Dunlop	DNF	
3	Seamus Elliott	Ireland	VC XII–Saint-Raphaël–Géminiani–Dunlop	61	
4	Pierre Everaert	France	VC XII–Saint-Raphaël–Géminiani–Dunlop	63	
5	Albertus Geldermans	Netherlands	VC XII–Saint-Raphaël–Géminiani–Dunlop	24	
6	Guy Ignolin	France	VC XII–Saint-Raphaël–Géminiani–Dunlop	37	
7	Jean-Claude Lebaube	France	VC XII–Saint-Raphaël–Géminiani–Dunlop	4	
8	Anatole Novak	France	VC XII–Saint-Raphaël–Géminiani–Dunlop	59	
9	Louis Rostollan	France	VC XII–Saint-Raphaël–Géminiani–Dunlop	DNF	
10	Gérard Thiélin	France	VC XII–Saint-Raphaël–Géminiani–Dunlop	31	
11	Pierre Beuffeuil	France	Mercier–BP–Hutchinson	47	
12	Robert Cazala	France	Mercier–BP–Hutchinson	30	
13	Jean Gainche	France	Mercier–BP–Hutchinson	20	
14	Alfons Hellemans	Belgium	Mercier–BP–Hutchinson	60	
15	Frans Melckenbeeck	Belgium	Mercier–BP–Hutchinson	DNF	
16	Jean Milesi	France	Mercier–BP–Hutchinson	68	
17	Raymond Poulidor	France	Mercier–BP–Hutchinson	8	
18	Simon Le Borgne	France	Mercier–BP–Hutchinson	DNF	
19	Victor Van Schil	Belgium	Mercier–BP–Hutchinson	22	
20	August Verhaegen	Belgium	Mercier–BP–Hutchinson	74	
21	Willy Bocklant	Belgium	Faema–Flandria	DNF	
22	Frans Brands	Belgium	Faema–Flandria	25	
23	Armand Desmet	Belgium	Faema–Flandria	5	
24	Noël Foré	Belgium	Faema–Flandria	DNF	
25	Antonio Gómez del Moral	Spain	Faema–Flandria	29	
26	Marcel Ongenae	Belgium	Faema–Flandria	58	
27	Jef Planckaert	Belgium	Faema–Flandria	DNF	
28	Clément Roman	Belgium	Faema–Flandria	DNF	
29	Angelino Soler	Spain	Faema–Flandria	6	
30	Antonio Suárez	Spain	Faema–Flandria	43	
31	Benoni Beheyt	Belgium	Wiel's–Groene Leeuw	49	
32	Gilbert Desmet	Belgium	Wiel's–Groene Leeuw	DNF	
33	Gilbert De Smet	Belgium	Wiel's–Groene Leeuw	44	
34	Daniel Doom	Belgium	Wiel's–Groene Leeuw	DNF	
35	Hans Junkermann	West Germany	Wiel's–Groene Leeuw	9	
36	André Messelis	Belgium	Wiel's–Groene Leeuw	DNF	
37	Yvo Molenaers	Belgium	Wiel's–Groene Leeuw	DNF	
38	Eddy Pauwels	Belgium	Wiel's–Groene Leeuw	13	
39	Dieter Puschel	West Germany	Wiel's–Groene Leeuw	15	
40	René Van Meenen	Belgium	Wiel's–Groene Leeuw	DNF	
41	Federico Bahamontes	Spain	Margnat–Paloma–Motul–Dunlop	2	
42	Juan Campillo	Spain	Margnat–Paloma–Motul–Dunlop	46	
43	André Darrigade	France	Margnat–Paloma–Motul–Dunlop	DNF	
44	Jean Dotto	France	Margnat–Paloma–Motul–Dunlop	28	
45	Jean Dupont	France	Margnat–Paloma–Motul–Dunlop	DNF	
46	Jean Graczyk	France	Margnat–Paloma–Motul–Dunlop	72	
47	Claude Mattio	France	Margnat–Paloma–Motul–Dunlop	52	
48	Luis Otaño	Spain	Margnat–Paloma–Motul–Dunlop	38	
49	Joseph Thomin	France	Margnat–Paloma–Motul–Dunlop	62	
50	Joseph Velly	France	Margnat–Paloma–Motul–Dunlop	DNF	
51	Carlo Azzini	Italy	Carpano	DNF	
52	Antonio Bailetti	Italy	Carpano	55	
53	Franco Balmamion	Italy	Carpano	DNF	
54	Germano Barale	Italy	Carpano	DNF	
55	Vendramino Bariviera	Italy	Carpano	DNF	
56	Kurt Gimmi	Switzerland	Carpano	DNF	
57	Ottavio Cogliati	Italy	Carpano	DNF	
58	Giancarlo Gentina	Italy	Carpano	DNF	
59	Loris Guernieri	Italy	Carpano	53	
60	Giuseppe Sartore	Italy	Carpano	DNF	
61	Henry Anglade	France	Pelforth–Sauvage–Lejeune–Wolber	11	
62	Guy Epaud	France	Pelforth–Sauvage–Lejeune–Wolber	48	
63	Dick Enthoven	Netherlands	Pelforth–Sauvage–Lejeune–Wolber	34	
64	André Foucher	France	Pelforth–Sauvage–Lejeune–Wolber	57	
65	Georges Groussard	France	Pelforth–Sauvage–Lejeune–Wolber	51	
66	Joseph Groussard	France	Pelforth–Sauvage–Lejeune–Wolber	64	
67	Jan Janssen	Netherlands	Pelforth–Sauvage–Lejeune–Wolber	DNF	
68	Roland Lacombe	France	Pelforth–Sauvage–Lejeune–Wolber	DNF	
69	François Mahé	France	Pelforth–Sauvage–Lejeune–Wolber	19	
70	Alan Ramsbottom	Great Britain	Pelforth–Sauvage–Lejeune–Wolber	16	
71	Antonio Bertrán	Spain	Ferrys	35	
72	Rogelio Hernández	Spain	Ferrys	27	
73	Antonio Karmany	Spain	Ferrys	54	
74	Fernando Manzaneque	Spain	Ferrys	12	
75	Esteban Martín	Spain	Ferrys	32	
76	Gabriel Mas	Spain	Ferrys	40	
77	José Pérez Francés	Spain	Ferrys	3	
78	Raúl Rey	Spain	Ferrys	71	
79	Julio San Emeterio	Spain	Ferrys	75	
80	Emilio Cruz	Spain	Ferrys	41	
81	Frans Aerenhouts	Belgium	GBC–Libertas	42	
82	Roger Baens	Belgium	GBC–Libertas	DNF	
83	Willy Derboven	Belgium	GBC–Libertas	76	
84	Ludo Janssens	Belgium	GBC–Libertas	39	
85	Willy Schroeders	Belgium	GBC–Libertas	DNF	
86	Edgard Sorgeloos	Belgium	GBC–Libertas	DNF	
87	Martin Van Geneugden	Belgium	GBC–Libertas	56	
88	Rik Van Looy	Belgium	GBC–Libertas	10	
89	Guillaume Van Tongerloo	Belgium	GBC–Libertas	45	
90	Huub Zilverberg	Netherlands	GBC–Libertas	DNF	
91	Graziano Battistini	Italy	IBAC–Molteni	18	
92	Danilo Ferrari	Italy	IBAC–Molteni	DNF	
93	Renzo Fontona	Italy	IBAC–Molteni	7	
94	Ernesto Minetto	Italy	IBAC–Molteni	DNF	
95	Angel Ottaviani	Italy	IBAC–Molteni	DNF	
96	Giacomo Fornoni	Italy	IBAC–Molteni	DNF	
97	Guido Carlesi	Italy	IBAC–Molteni	DNF	
98	Peppino Dante	Italy	IBAC–Molteni	DNF	
99	Roberto Falaschi	Italy	IBAC–Molteni	DNF	
100	Nello Velucchi	Italy	IBAC–Molteni	DNF	
101	Antonio Barrutia	Spain	KAS–Kaskol	DNF	
102	Carlos Echeverría	Spain	KAS–Kaskol	DNF	
103	Sebastián Elorza	Spain	KAS–Kaskol	36	
104	Francisco Gabica	Spain	KAS–Kaskol	14	
105	José María López Caño	Spain	KAS–Kaskol	DNF	
106	Miguel Pacheco	Spain	KAS–Kaskol	17	
107	Manuel Martín Piñera	Spain	KAS–Kaskol	DNF	
108	Valentín Uriona	Spain	KAS–Kaskol	50	
109	Juan Sánchez	Spain	KAS–Kaskol	DNF	
110	Eusebio Vélez	Spain	KAS–Kaskol	DNF	
111	Ferdinand Bracke	Belgium	Peugeot–BP–Englebert	21	
112	Pino Cerami	Belgium	Peugeot–BP–Englebert	DNF	
113	Emile Daems	Belgium	Peugeot–BP–Englebert	67	
114	Charly Gaul	Luxembourg	Peugeot–BP–Englebert	DNF	
115	Jos Hoevenaers	Belgium	Peugeot–BP–Englebert	23	
116	Raymond Impanis	Belgium	Peugeot–BP–Englebert	66	
117	Jean Simon	Belgium	Peugeot–BP–Englebert	70	
118	Henri Duez	France	Peugeot–BP–Englebert	26	
119	Willy Vannitsen	Belgium	Peugeot–BP–Englebert	DNF	
120	Rolf Wolfshohl	West Germany	Peugeot–BP–Englebert	DNF	
121	Jaak De Boever	Belgium	Solo–Terrot–Englebert	DNF	
122	Roger De Breuker	Belgium	Solo–Terrot–Englebert	73	
123	Arthur Decabooter	Belgium	Solo–Terrot–Englebert	DNF	
124	Henri De Wolf	Belgium	Solo–Terrot–Englebert	33	
125	Marcel Janssens	Belgium	Solo–Terrot–Englebert	DNF	
126	Robert Lelangue	Belgium	Solo–Terrot–Englebert	69	
127	Louis Proost	Belgium	Solo–Terrot–Englebert	65	
128	Marcel Seynaeve	Belgium	Solo–Terrot–Englebert	DNF	
129	Michel Van Aerde	Belgium	Solo–Terrot–Englebert	DNF	
130	Joseph Wouters	Belgium	Solo–Terrot–Englebert	DNF	
