= 1963 Tour de France, Stage 11 to Stage 21 =

Cycling race stages

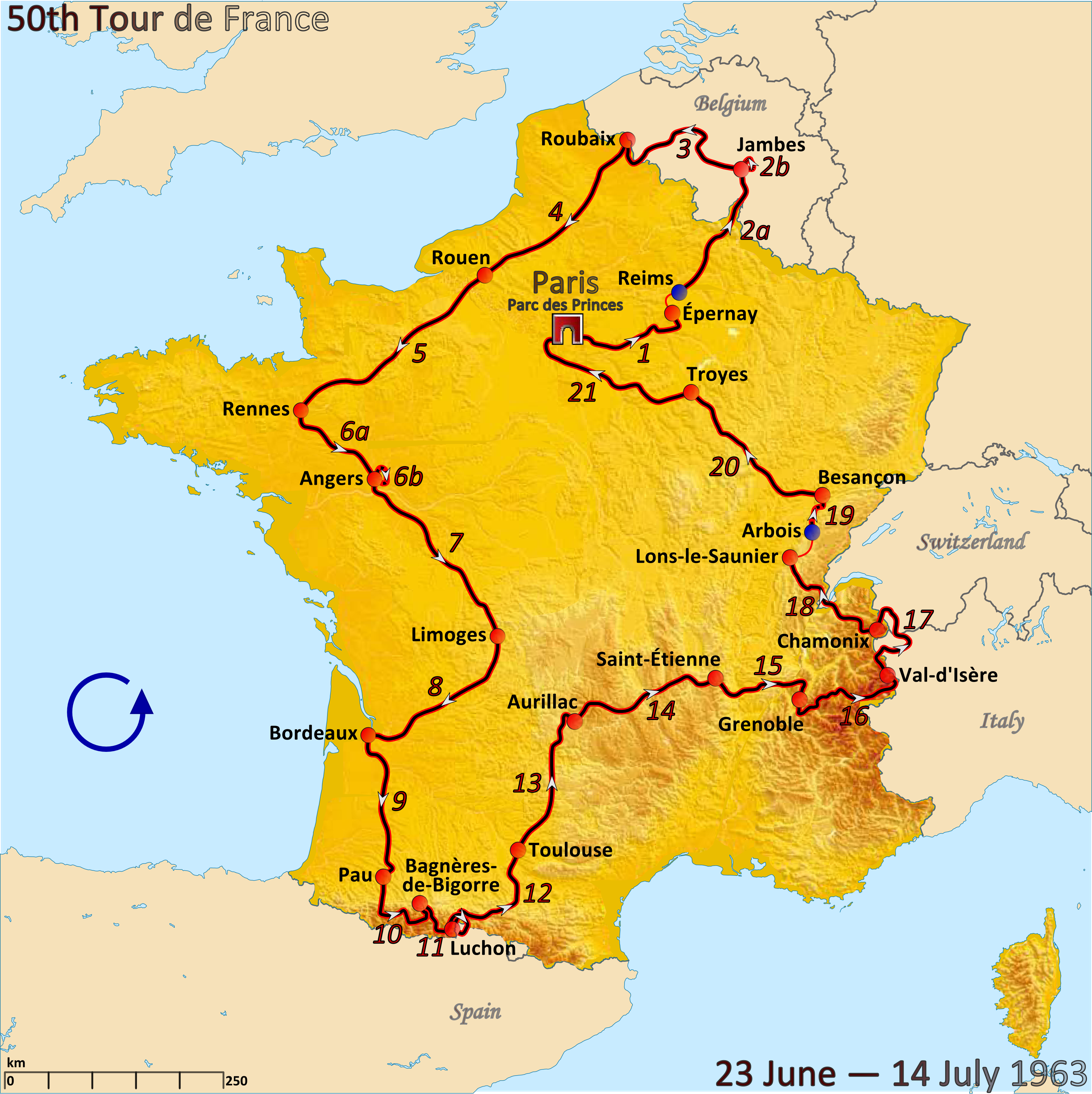
Route of the 1963 Tour de France

The 1963 Tour de France was the 50th edition of Tour de France, one of cycling's Grand Tours. The Tour began in Paris with a flat stage on 23 June and Stage 11 occurred on 3 July with a mountainous stage from Bagnères-de-Bigorre. The race finished in Paris on 14 July.

== Stage 11 ==
3 July 1963 - Bagnères-de-Bigorre to Luchon, 131 km (81.4 mi)

Stage 11 result

Rank	Rider	Team	Time
1	Guy Ignolin (FRA)	Saint-Raphaël–Gitane–R. Geminiani	3h 47' 34"
2	Claude Mattio (FRA)	Margnat–Paloma–Dunlop	+ 1' 15"
3	Guy Epaud (FRA)	Pelforth–Sauvage–Lejeune	+ 1' 41"
4	Raymond Poulidor (FRA)	Mercier–BP–Hutchinson	+ 2' 26"
5	José Pérez Francés (ESP)	Ferrys	+ 2' 37"
6	Angelino Soler (ESP)	Flandria–Faema	s.t.
7	Jacques Anquetil (FRA)	Saint-Raphaël–Gitane–R. Geminiani	s.t.
8	Federico Bahamontes (ESP)	Margnat–Paloma–Dunlop	+ 2' 47"
9	Jean Gainche (FRA)	Mercier–BP–Hutchinson	+ 3' 05"
10	Gilbert Desmet (BEL)	Wiel's–Groene Leeuw	+ 3' 20"

General classification after stage 11

Rank	Rider	Team	Time
1	Gilbert Desmet (BEL)	Wiel's–Groene Leeuw	56h 41' 31"
2	Jacques Anquetil (FRA)	Saint-Raphaël–Gitane–R. Geminiani	+ 3' 03"
3	Henry Anglade (FRA)	Pelforth–Sauvage–Lejeune	+ 4' 12"
4	Raymond Poulidor (FRA)	Mercier–BP–Hutchinson	+ 5' 22"
5	Federico Bahamontes (ESP)	Margnat–Paloma–Dunlop	+ 5' 32"
6	Eddy Pauwels (BEL)	Wiel's–Groene Leeuw	+ 7' 31"
7	Angelino Soler (ESP)	Flandria–Faema	+ 7' 47"
8	José Pérez Francés (ESP)	Ferrys	+ 8' 00"
9	Jean-Claude Lebaube (FRA)	Saint-Raphaël–Gitane–R. Geminiani	+ 9' 04"
10	Armand Desmet (BEL)	Flandria–Faema	+ 9' 53"

== Stage 12 ==
4 July 1963 - Luchon to Toulouse, 173 km (107.5 mi)

Stage 12 result

Rank	Rider	Team	Time
1	André Darrigade (FRA)	Margnat–Paloma–Dunlop	4h 33' 49"
2	Rik Van Looy (BEL)	G.B.C.–Libertas	s.t.
3	Michel Van Aerde (BEL)	Solo–Terrot	s.t.
4	Benoni Beheyt (BEL)	Wiel's–Groene Leeuw	s.t.
5	Robert Lelangue (BEL)	Solo–Terrot	s.t.
6	José Pérez Francés (ESP)	Ferrys	s.t.
7	Jean Graczyk (FRA)	Margnat–Paloma–Dunlop	s.t.
8	Willy Derboven (BEL)	G.B.C.–Libertas	s.t.
9	Emile Daems (BEL)	Peugeot–BP–Englebert	s.t.
10	Jaak De Boever (BEL)	Solo–Terrot	s.t.

General classification after stage 12

Rank	Rider	Team	Time
1	Gilbert Desmet (BEL)	Wiel's–Groene Leeuw	61h 15' 20"
2	Jacques Anquetil (FRA)	Saint-Raphaël–Gitane–R. Geminiani	+ 3' 03"
3	Henry Anglade (FRA)	Pelforth–Sauvage–Lejeune	+ 4' 12"
4	Raymond Poulidor (FRA)	Mercier–BP–Hutchinson	+ 5' 22"
5	Federico Bahamontes (ESP)	Margnat–Paloma–Dunlop	+ 5' 32"
6	Eddy Pauwels (BEL)	Wiel's–Groene Leeuw	+ 7' 31"
7	Angelino Soler (ESP)	Flandria–Faema	+ 7' 47"
8	José Pérez Francés (ESP)	Ferrys	+ 8' 00"
9	Jean-Claude Lebaube (FRA)	Saint-Raphaël–Gitane–R. Geminiani	+ 9' 04"
10	Armand Desmet (BEL)	Flandria–Faema	+ 9' 53"

== Stage 13 ==
5 July 1963 - Toulouse to Aurillac, 234 km (145 mi)

Stage 13 result

Rank	Rider	Team	Time
1	Rik Van Looy (BEL)	G.B.C.–Libertas	6h 58' 05"
2	Jacques Anquetil (FRA)	Saint-Raphaël–Gitane–R. Geminiani	+ 37"
3	Federico Bahamontes (ESP)	Margnat–Paloma–Dunlop	s.t.
4	Raymond Poulidor (FRA)	Mercier–BP–Hutchinson	s.t.
5	Gilbert Desmet (BEL)	Wiel's–Groene Leeuw	s.t.
6	Willy Bocklant (BEL)	Flandria–Faema	s.t.
7	Frans Aerenhouts (BEL)	G.B.C.–Libertas	s.t.
8	Guy Ignolin (FRA)	Saint-Raphaël–Gitane–R. Geminiani	s.t.
9	François Mahé (FRA)	Pelforth–Sauvage–Lejeune	s.t.
10	Armand Desmet (BEL)	Flandria–Faema	s.t.

General classification after stage 13

Rank	Rider	Team	Time
1	Gilbert Desmet (BEL)	Wiel's–Groene Leeuw	68h 14' 02"
2	Jacques Anquetil (FRA)	Saint-Raphaël–Gitane–R. Geminiani	+ 2' 33"
3	Raymond Poulidor (FRA)	Mercier–BP–Hutchinson	+ 5' 22"
4	Federico Bahamontes (ESP)	Margnat–Paloma–Dunlop	+ 5' 32"
5	Henry Anglade (FRA)	Pelforth–Sauvage–Lejeune	+ 6' 29"
6	Eddy Pauwels (BEL)	Wiel's–Groene Leeuw	+ 7' 31"
7	Angelino Soler (ESP)	Flandria–Faema	+ 7' 47"
8	José Pérez Francés (ESP)	Ferrys	+ 8' 00"
9	Jean-Claude Lebaube (FRA)	Saint-Raphaël–Gitane–R. Geminiani	+ 9' 04"
10	Armand Desmet (BEL)	Flandria–Faema	+ 9' 53"

== Rest Day ==
6 July 1963 - Aurillac

== Stage 14 ==
7 July 1963 - Aurillac to Saint-Étienne, 237 km (147 mi)

Stage 14 result

Rank	Rider	Team	Time
1	Guy Ignolin (FRA)	Saint-Raphaël–Gitane–R. Geminiani	6h 46' 34"
2	Anatole Novak (FRA)	Saint-Raphaël–Gitane–R. Geminiani	s.t.
3	Jean Gainche (FRA)	Mercier–BP–Hutchinson	s.t.
4	André Foucher (FRA)	Pelforth–Sauvage–Lejeune	+ 1"
5	Dick Enthoven (NED)	Pelforth–Sauvage–Lejeune	+ 3"
6	Loris Guernieri (ITA)	Carpano	+ 8' 12"
7	Rik Van Looy (BEL)	G.B.C.–Libertas	+ 8' 19"
8	Benoni Beheyt (BEL)	Wiel's–Groene Leeuw	s.t.
9	Gilbert Desmet (BEL)	Wiel's–Groene Leeuw	s.t.
10	Jean Stablinski (FRA)	Saint-Raphaël–Gitane–R. Geminiani	s.t.

General classification after stage 14

Rank	Rider	Team	Time
1	Gilbert Desmet (BEL)	Wiel's–Groene Leeuw	75h 08' 55"
2	Jacques Anquetil (FRA)	Saint-Raphaël–Gitane–R. Geminiani	+ 2' 33"
3	Jean Gainche (FRA)	Mercier–BP–Hutchinson	+ 5' 20"
4	Raymond Poulidor (FRA)	Mercier–BP–Hutchinson	+ 5' 22"
5	Federico Bahamontes (ESP)	Margnat–Paloma–Dunlop	+ 5' 32"
6	Henry Anglade (FRA)	Pelforth–Sauvage–Lejeune	+ 6' 29"
7	Eddy Pauwels (BEL)	Wiel's–Groene Leeuw	+ 7' 31"
8	Angelino Soler (ESP)	Flandria–Faema	+ 7' 47"
9	José Pérez Francés (ESP)	Ferrys	+ 8' 00"
10	Jean-Claude Lebaube (FRA)	Saint-Raphaël–Gitane–R. Geminiani	+ 9' 04"

== Stage 15 ==
8 July 1963 - Saint-Étienne to Grenoble, 174 km (108 mi)

Stage 15 result

Rank	Rider	Team	Time
1	Federico Bahamontes (ESP)	Margnat–Paloma–Dunlop	4h 59' 13"
2	Henry Anglade (FRA)	Pelforth–Sauvage–Lejeune	+ 1' 16"
3	Jos Hoevenaers (BEL)	Peugeot–BP–Englebert	+ 1' 56"
4	Rik Van Looy (BEL)	G.B.C.–Libertas	+ 2' 02"
5	Gilbert Desmet (BEL)	Wiel's–Groene Leeuw	s.t.
6	Jean Gainche (FRA)	Mercier–BP–Hutchinson	s.t.
7	Armand Desmet (BEL)	Flandria–Faema	s.t.
8	Willy Bocklant (BEL)	Flandria–Faema	s.t.
9	Victor Van Schil (BEL)	Mercier–BP–Hutchinson	s.t.
10	Fernando Manzaneque (ESP)	Ferrys	s.t.

General classification after stage 15

Rank	Rider	Team	Time
1	Gilbert Desmet (BEL)	Wiel's–Groene Leeuw	80h 10' 10"
2	Federico Bahamontes (ESP)	Margnat–Paloma–Dunlop	+ 2' 30"
3	Jacques Anquetil (FRA)	Saint-Raphaël–Gitane–R. Geminiani	+ 2' 33"
4	Henry Anglade (FRA)	Pelforth–Sauvage–Lejeune	+ 5' 13"
5	Jean Gainche (FRA)	Mercier–BP–Hutchinson	+ 5' 20"
6	Raymond Poulidor (FRA)	Mercier–BP–Hutchinson	+ 5' 22"
7	Eddy Pauwels (BEL)	Wiel's–Groene Leeuw	+ 7' 31"
8	Angelino Soler (ESP)	Flandria–Faema	+ 7' 47"
9	José Pérez Francés (ESP)	Ferrys	+ 8' 00"
10	Jean-Claude Lebaube (FRA)	Saint-Raphaël–Gitane–R. Geminiani	+ 9' 04"

== Stage 16 ==
9 July 1963 - Grenoble to Val d'Isère, 202 km (126 mi)

Stage 16 result

Rank	Rider	Team	Time
1	Fernando Manzaneque (ESP)	Ferrys	6h 20' 48"
2	Renzo Fontona (ITA)	IBAC	+ 5' 03"
3	Guy Epaud (FRA)	Pelforth–Sauvage–Lejeune	+ 5' 38"
4	Rik Van Looy (BEL)	G.B.C.–Libertas	+ 7' 38"
5	José Pérez Francés (ESP)	Ferrys	s.t.
6	Graziano Battistini (ITA)	IBAC	+ 7' 40"
7	Jacques Anquetil (FRA)	Saint-Raphaël–Gitane–R. Geminiani	s.t.
8	Armand Desmet (BEL)	Flandria–Faema	s.t.
9	Hans Junkermann (FRG)	Wiel's–Groene Leeuw	s.t.
10	Kurt Gimmi (SUI)	Carpano	s.t.

General classification after stage 16

Rank	Rider	Team	Time
1	Federico Bahamontes (ESP)	Margnat–Paloma–Dunlop	86h 41' 08"
2	Jacques Anquetil (FRA)	Saint-Raphaël–Gitane–R. Geminiani	+ 3"
3	Henry Anglade (FRA)	Pelforth–Sauvage–Lejeune	+ 2' 43"
4	Raymond Poulidor (FRA)	Mercier–BP–Hutchinson	+ 2' 52"
5	Angelino Soler (ESP)	Flandria–Faema	+ 5' 17"
6	José Pérez Francés (ESP)	Ferrys	+ 5' 28"
7	Gilbert Desmet (BEL)	Wiel's–Groene Leeuw	+ 6' 22"
8	Jean-Claude Lebaube (FRA)	Saint-Raphaël–Gitane–R. Geminiani	+ 6' 34"
9	Eddy Pauwels (BEL)	Wiel's–Groene Leeuw	+ 7' 00"
10	Armand Desmet (BEL)	Flandria–Faema	+ 7' 23"

== Stage 17 ==
10 July 1963 - Val d'Isère to Chamonix, 228 km (142 mi)

Stage 17 result

Rank	Rider	Team	Time
1	Jacques Anquetil (FRA)	Saint-Raphaël–Gitane–R. Geminiani	7h 25' 05"
2	Federico Bahamontes (ESP)	Margnat–Paloma–Dunlop	+ 1"
3	Rik Van Looy (BEL)	G.B.C.–Libertas	+ 18"
4	José Pérez Francés (ESP)	Ferrys	s.t.
5	Hans Junkermann (FRG)	Wiel's–Groene Leeuw	s.t.
6	Renzo Fontona (ITA)	IBAC	s.t.
7	Armand Desmet (BEL)	Flandria–Faema	s.t.
8	Jean-Claude Lebaube (FRA)	Saint-Raphaël–Gitane–R. Geminiani	+ 1' 04"
9	Graziano Battistini (ITA)	IBAC	+ 2' 58"
10	Francisco Gabica (ESP)	Kas–Kaskol	+ 3' 57"

General classification after stage 17

Rank	Rider	Team	Time
1	Jacques Anquetil (FRA)	Saint-Raphaël–Gitane–R. Geminiani	94h 05' 16"
2	Federico Bahamontes (ESP)	Margnat–Paloma–Dunlop	+ 28"
3	José Pérez Francés (ESP)	Ferrys	+ 6' 43"
4	Jean-Claude Lebaube (FRA)	Saint-Raphaël–Gitane–R. Geminiani	+ 8' 35"
5	Armand Desmet (BEL)	Flandria–Faema	+ 8' 38"
6	Renzo Fontona (ITA)	IBAC	+ 10' 29"
7	Angelino Soler (ESP)	Flandria–Faema	+ 11' 27"
8	Raymond Poulidor (FRA)	Mercier–BP–Hutchinson	+ 12' 12"
9	Hans Junkermann (FRG)	Wiel's–Groene Leeuw	+ 13' 10"
10	Henry Anglade (FRA)	Pelforth–Sauvage–Lejeune	+ 15' 20"

== Stage 18 ==
11 July 1963 - Chamonix to Lons-le-Saunier, 225 km (140 mi)

Stage 18 result

Rank	Rider	Team	Time
1	Frans Brands (BEL)	Flandria–Faema	6h 43' 47"
2	Rik Van Looy (BEL)	G.B.C.–Libertas	+ 2' 59"
3	Benoni Beheyt (BEL)	Wiel's–Groene Leeuw	s.t.
4	Antonio Bailetti (ITA)	Carpano	s.t.
5	Henri De Wolf (BEL)	Solo–Terrot	s.t.
6	Willy Derboven (BEL)	G.B.C.–Libertas	s.t.
7	Roger De Breuker (BEL)	Solo–Terrot	s.t.
8	Jean Simon (BEL)	Peugeot–BP–Englebert	s.t.
9	Victor Van Schil (BEL)	Mercier–BP–Hutchinson	s.t.
10	Guillaume Van Tongerloo (BEL)	G.B.C.–Libertas	s.t.

General classification after stage 18

Rank	Rider	Team	Time
1	Jacques Anquetil (FRA)	Saint-Raphaël–Gitane–R. Geminiani	100h 52' 02"
2	Federico Bahamontes (ESP)	Margnat–Paloma–Dunlop	+ 28"
3	José Pérez Francés (ESP)	Ferrys	+ 6' 43"
4	Jean-Claude Lebaube (FRA)	Saint-Raphaël–Gitane–R. Geminiani	+ 8' 35"
5	Armand Desmet (BEL)	Flandria–Faema	+ 8' 38"
6	Renzo Fontona (ITA)	IBAC	+ 10' 29"
7	Angelino Soler (ESP)	Flandria–Faema	+ 11' 27"
8	Raymond Poulidor (FRA)	Mercier–BP–Hutchinson	+ 12' 12"
9	Hans Junkermann (FRG)	Wiel's–Groene Leeuw	+ 13' 10"
10	Henry Anglade (FRA)	Pelforth–Sauvage–Lejeune	+ 15' 20"

== Stage 19 ==
12 July 1963 - Arbois to Besançon, 54 km (34 mi) (ITT)

Stage 19 result

Rank	Rider	Team	Time
1	Jacques Anquetil (FRA)	Saint-Raphaël–Gitane–R. Geminiani	1h 12' 20"
2	Ferdinand Bracke (BEL)	Peugeot–BP–Englebert	+ 1' 04"
3	Federico Bahamontes (ESP)	Margnat–Paloma–Dunlop	+ 2' 07"
4	Miguel Pacheco (ESP)	Kas–Kaskol	+ 2' 15"
5	Jean-Claude Lebaube (FRA)	Saint-Raphaël–Gitane–R. Geminiani	+ 2' 20"
6	José Pérez Francés (ESP)	Ferrys	+ 2' 31"
7	Angelino Soler (ESP)	Flandria–Faema	+ 2' 37"
8	Raymond Poulidor (FRA)	Mercier–BP–Hutchinson	+ 3' 34"
9	Louis Proost (BEL)	Solo–Terrot	+ 3' 37"
10	Rik Van Looy (BEL)	G.B.C.–Libertas	+ 3' 53"

General classification after stage 19

Rank	Rider	Team	Time
1	Jacques Anquetil (FRA)	Saint-Raphaël–Gitane–R. Geminiani	102h 03' 22"
2	Federico Bahamontes (ESP)	Margnat–Paloma–Dunlop	+ 3' 35"
3	José Pérez Francés (ESP)	Ferrys	+ 10' 14"
4	Jean-Claude Lebaube (FRA)	Saint-Raphaël–Gitane–R. Geminiani	+ 11' 55"
5	Armand Desmet (BEL)	Flandria–Faema	+ 15' 00"
6	Angelino Soler (ESP)	Flandria–Faema	+ 15' 04"
7	Renzo Fontona (ITA)	IBAC	+ 15' 27"
8	Raymond Poulidor (FRA)	Mercier–BP–Hutchinson	+ 16' 46"
9	Hans Junkermann (FRG)	Wiel's–Groene Leeuw	+ 18' 53"
10	Rik Van Looy (BEL)	G.B.C.–Libertas	+ 20' 24"

== Stage 20 ==
13 July 1963 - Besançon to Troyes, 234 km (145 mi)

Stage 20 result

Rank	Rider	Team	Time
1	Roger De Breuker (BEL)	Solo–Terrot	6h 20' 06"
2	Martin Van Geneugden (BEL)	G.B.C.–Libertas	s.t.
3	Willy Derboven (BEL)	G.B.C.–Libertas	+ 4"
4	Rik Van Looy (BEL)	G.B.C.–Libertas	+ 16"
5	Louis Proost (BEL)	Solo–Terrot	s.t.
6	Benoni Beheyt (BEL)	Wiel's–Groene Leeuw	s.t.
7	Antonio Bailetti (ITA)	Carpano	s.t.
8	Jean Graczyk (FRA)	Margnat–Paloma–Dunlop	s.t.
9	Marcel Ongenae (BEL)	Flandria–Faema	s.t.
10	Frans Aerenhouts (BEL)	G.B.C.–Libertas	s.t.

General classification after stage 20

Rank	Rider	Team	Time
1	Jacques Anquetil (FRA)	Saint-Raphaël–Gitane–R. Geminiani	108h 23' 44"
2	Federico Bahamontes (ESP)	Margnat–Paloma–Dunlop	+ 3' 35"
3	José Pérez Francés (ESP)	Ferrys	+ 10' 14"
4	Jean-Claude Lebaube (FRA)	Saint-Raphaël–Gitane–R. Geminiani	+ 11' 55"
5	Armand Desmet (BEL)	Flandria–Faema	+ 15' 00"
6	Angelino Soler (ESP)	Flandria–Faema	+ 15' 04"
7	Renzo Fontona (ITA)	IBAC	+ 15' 27"
8	Raymond Poulidor (FRA)	Mercier–BP–Hutchinson	+ 16' 46"
9	Hans Junkermann (FRG)	Wiel's–Groene Leeuw	+ 18' 53"
10	Rik Van Looy (BEL)	G.B.C.–Libertas	+ 20' 24"

== Stage 21 ==
14 July 1963 - Troyes to Paris, 185 km (115 mi)

Stage 21 result

Rank	Rider	Team	Time
1	Rik Van Looy (BEL)	G.B.C.–Libertas	5h 06' 21"
2	Benoni Beheyt (BEL)	Wiel's–Groene Leeuw	s.t.
3	Robert Lelangue (BEL)	Solo–Terrot	s.t.
4	Frans Aerenhouts (BEL)	G.B.C.–Libertas	s.t.
5	Frans Brands (BEL)	Flandria–Faema	s.t.
6	Jean Gainche (FRA)	Mercier–BP–Hutchinson	s.t.
7	Emile Daems (BEL)	Peugeot–BP–Englebert	s.t.
8	Martin Van Geneugden (BEL)	G.B.C.–Libertas	s.t.
9	Marcel Ongenae (BEL)	Flandria–Faema	s.t.
10	Victor Van Schil (BEL)	Mercier–BP–Hutchinson	s.t.

General classification after stage 21

Rank	Rider	Team	Time
1	Jacques Anquetil (FRA)	Saint-Raphaël–Gitane–R. Geminiani	113h 30' 05"
2	Federico Bahamontes (ESP)	Margnat–Paloma–Dunlop	+ 3' 35"
3	José Pérez Francés (ESP)	Ferrys	+ 10' 14"
4	Jean-Claude Lebaube (FRA)	Saint-Raphaël–Gitane–R. Geminiani	+ 11' 55"
5	Armand Desmet (BEL)	Flandria–Faema	+ 15' 00"
6	Angelino Soler (ESP)	Flandria–Faema	+ 15' 04"
7	Renzo Fontona (ITA)	IBAC	+ 15' 27"
8	Raymond Poulidor (FRA)	Mercier–BP–Hutchinson	+ 16' 46"
9	Hans Junkermann (FRG)	Wiel's–Groene Leeuw	+ 18' 53"
10	Rik Van Looy (BEL)	G.B.C.–Libertas	+ 19' 24"
