= 1963 Tour de France, Stage 1 to Stage 10 =

Cycling race stages

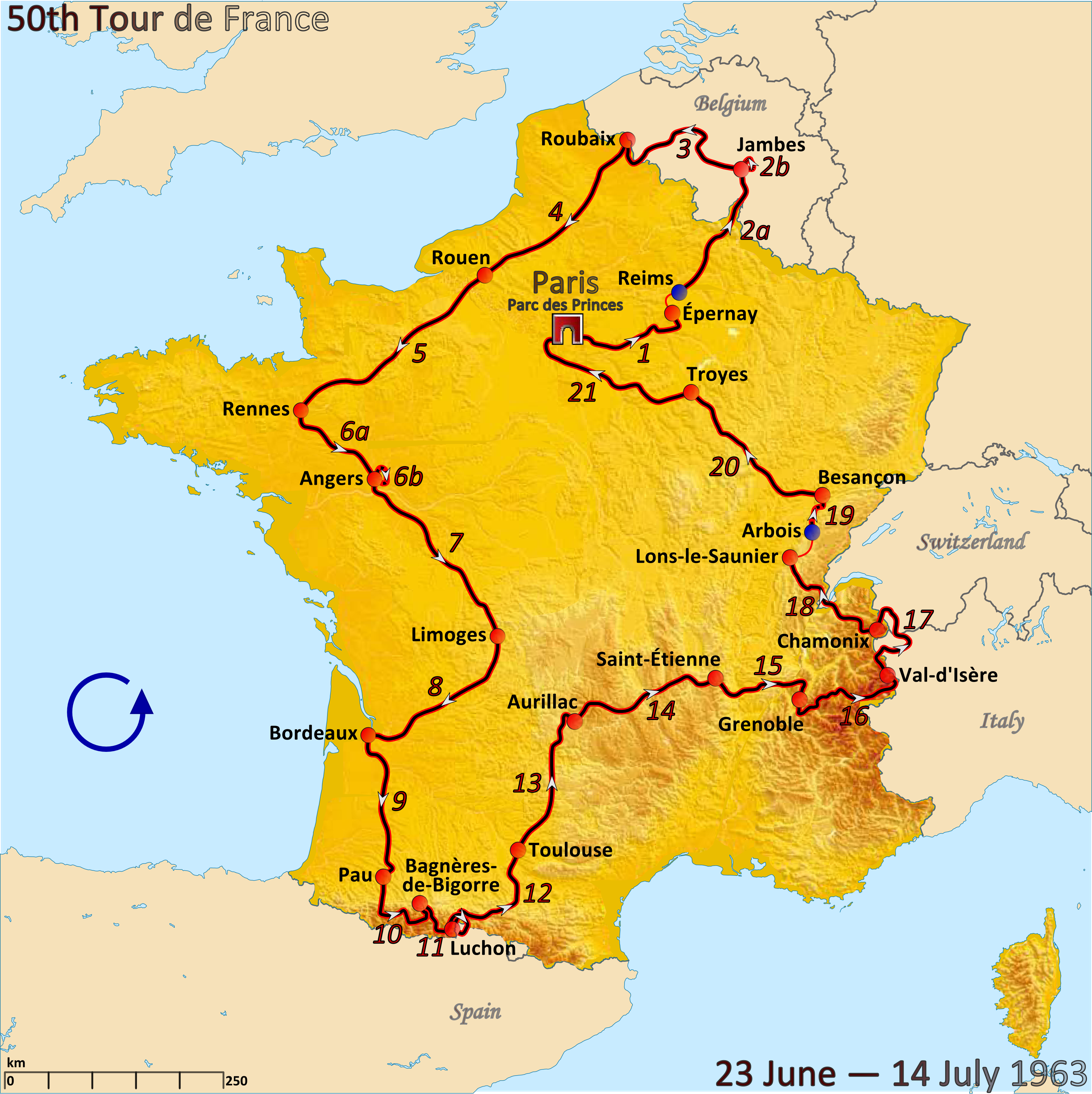
Route of the 1963 Tour de France

The 1963 Tour de France was the 50th edition of Tour de France, one of cycling's Grand Tours. The Tour began in Paris with a flat stage on 23 June and Stage 10 occurred on 2 July with a mountainous stage to Bagnères-de-Bigorre. The race finished in Paris on 14 July.

== Stage 1 ==
23 June 1963 - Paris to Épernay, 152 km (94.4 mi)

Stage 1 result

	Rider	Team	Time
1	Eddy Pauwels (BEL)	Wiel's–Groene Leeuw	3h 30' 03"
2	Edgard Sorgeloos (BEL)	G.B.C.–Libertas	s.t.
3	Alan Ramsbottom (GBR)	Pelforth–Sauvage–Lejeune	s.t.
4	Federico Bahamontes (ESP)	Margnat–Paloma–Dunlop	s.t.
5	Guillaume Van Tongerloo (BEL)	G.B.C.–Libertas	+ 1' 23"
6	Rik Van Looy (BEL)	G.B.C.–Libertas	+ 1' 28"
7	Benoni Beheyt (BEL)	Wiel's–Groene Leeuw	s.t.
8	Gilbert Desmet (BEL)	Wiel's–Groene Leeuw	s.t.
9	Jean Graczyk (FRA)	Margnat–Paloma–Dunlop	s.t.
10	Martin Van Geneugden (BEL)	G.B.C.–Libertas	s.t.

General classification after stage 1

Rank	Rider	Team	Time
1	Eddy Pauwels (BEL)	Wiel's–Groene Leeuw	3h 29' 03"
2	Edgard Sorgeloos (BEL)	G.B.C.–Libertas	+ 30"
3	Alan Ramsbottom (GBR)	Pelforth–Sauvage–Lejeune	+ 1' 00"
4	Federico Bahamontes (ESP)	Margnat–Paloma–Dunlop	s.t.
5	Guillaume Van Tongerloo (BEL)	G.B.C.–Libertas	+ 2' 23"
6	Rik Van Looy (BEL)	G.B.C.–Libertas	+ 2' 28"
7	Benoni Beheyt (BEL)	Wiel's–Groene Leeuw	s.t.
8	Gilbert Desmet (BEL)	Wiel's–Groene Leeuw	s.t.
9	Jean Graczyk (FRA)	Margnat–Paloma–Dunlop	s.t.
10	Martin Van Geneugden (BEL)	G.B.C.–Libertas	s.t.

== Stage 2a ==
24 June 1963 - Reims to Jambes, 186 km (115.6 mi)

Stage 2a result

Rank	Rider	Team	Time
1	Rik Van Looy (BEL)	G.B.C.–Libertas	4h 25' 24"
2	André Darrigade (FRA)	Margnat–Paloma–Dunlop	s.t.
3	Frans Melckenbeeck (BEL)	Mercier–BP–Hutchinson	s.t.
4	Benoni Beheyt (BEL)	Wiel's–Groene Leeuw	s.t.
5	Jan Janssen (NED)	Pelforth–Sauvage–Lejeune	s.t.
6	Henri De Wolf (BEL)	Solo–Terrot	s.t.
7	Kurt Gimmi (SUI)	Carpano	s.t.
8	Willy Bocklant (BEL)	Flandria–Faema	s.t.
9	Edgard Sorgeloos (BEL)	G.B.C.–Libertas	s.t.
10	Gilbert Desmet (BEL)	Wiel's–Groene Leeuw	s.t.

General classification after stage 2a

Rank	Rider	Team	Time
1	Eddy Pauwels (BEL)	Wiel's–Groene Leeuw	7h 54' 27"
2	Edgard Sorgeloos (BEL)	G.B.C.–Libertas	+ 30"
3	Alan Ramsbottom (GBR)	Pelforth–Sauvage–Lejeune	+ 1' 00"
4	Federico Bahamontes (ESP)	Margnat–Paloma–Dunlop	s.t.
5	Rik Van Looy (BEL)	G.B.C.–Libertas	+ 1' 28"
6	André Darrigade (FRA)	Margnat–Paloma–Dunlop	+ 1' 58"
7	Guillaume Van Tongerloo (BEL)	G.B.C.–Libertas	+ 2' 23"
8	Benoni Beheyt (BEL)	Wiel's–Groene Leeuw	+ 2' 28"
9	Gilbert Desmet (BEL)	Wiel's–Groene Leeuw	s.t.
10	Frans Aerenhouts (BEL)	G.B.C.–Libertas	s.t.

== Stage 2b ==
24 June 1963 - Jambes, 22 km (13.7 mi) (TTT)

Stage 2b result

Rank	Team	Time
1	Pelforth–Sauvage–Lejeune	1h 23' 54"
2	Flandria–Faema	+ 15"
3	Peugeot–BP–Englebert	+ 45"
4	Saint-Raphaël–Gitane–R. Geminiani	+ 57"
5	Wiel's–Groene Leeuw	+ 1' 03"
6	G.B.C.–Libertas	s.t.
7	Margnat–Paloma–Dunlop	+ 1' 24"
8	Mercier–BP–Hutchinson	+ 1' 43"
9	Carpano	+ 2' 03"
10	Solo–Terrot	+ 3' 35"

General classification after stage 2b

Rank	Rider	Team	Time
1	Eddy Pauwels (BEL)	Wiel's–Groene Leeuw	8h 22' 46"
2	Edgard Sorgeloos (BEL)	G.B.C.–Libertas	+ 30"
3	Alan Ramsbottom (GBR)	Pelforth–Sauvage–Lejeune	+ 39"
4	Federico Bahamontes (ESP)	Margnat–Paloma–Dunlop	+ 1' 07"
5	Rik Van Looy (BEL)	G.B.C.–Libertas	+ 1' 28"
6	André Darrigade (FRA)	Margnat–Paloma–Dunlop	+ 2' 05"
7	Jan Janssen (NED)	Pelforth–Sauvage–Lejeune	+ 2' 07
8	Henry Anglade (FRA)	Pelforth–Sauvage–Lejeune	s.t.
9	Willy Bocklant (BEL)	Flandria–Faema	+ 2' 12"
10	Jef Planckaert (BEL)	Flandria–Faema	s.t.

== Stage 3 ==
25 June 1963 - Jambes to Roubaix, 223 km (139 mi)

Stage 3 result

Rank	Rider	Team	Time
1	Seamus Elliott (IRL)	Saint-Raphaël–Gitane–R. Geminiani	6h 10' 38"
2	Jean Stablinski (FRA)	Saint-Raphaël–Gitane–R. Geminiani	+ 33"
3	Michel Van Aerde (BEL)	Solo–Terrot	s.t.
4	Guillaume Van Tongerloo (BEL)	G.B.C.–Libertas	s.t.
5	Gilbert Desmet (BEL)	Wiel's–Groene Leeuw	s.t.
6	Luis Otaño (ESP)	Margnat–Paloma–Dunlop	s.t.
7	Antonio Suárez (ESP)	Flandria–Faema	s.t.
8	Henry Anglade (FRA)	Pelforth–Sauvage–Lejeune	s.t.
9	Dick Enthoven (NED)	Pelforth–Sauvage–Lejeune	+ 59"
10	Willy Schroeders (BEL)	G.B.C.–Libertas	+ 1' 47"

General classification after stage 3

Rank	Rider	Team	Time
1	Seamus Elliott (IRL)	Saint-Raphaël–Gitane–R. Geminiani	14h 34' 50"
2	Henry Anglade (FRA)	Pelforth–Sauvage–Lejeune	+ 1' 14"
3	Guillaume Van Tongerloo (BEL)	G.B.C.–Libertas	+ 1' 30"
4	Gilbert Desmet (BEL)	Wiel's–Groene Leeuw	+ 1' 35"
5	Luis Otaño (ESP)	Margnat–Paloma–Dunlop	+ 2' 28"
6	Jean Stablinski (FRA)	Saint-Raphaël–Gitane–R. Geminiani	+ 6' 03"
7	Antonio Suárez (ESP)	Flandria–Faema	+ 6' 19"
8	Eddy Pauwels (BEL)	Wiel's–Groene Leeuw	+ 7' 18"
9	Michel Van Aerde (BEL)	Solo–Terrot	+ 7' 27"
10	Edgard Sorgeloos (BEL)	G.B.C.–Libertas	+ 7' 48"

== Stage 4 ==
26 June 1963 - Roubaix to Rouen, 236 km (147 mi)

Stage 4 result

Rank	Rider	Team	Time
1	Frans Melckenbeeck (BEL)	Mercier–BP–Hutchinson	6h 41' 04"
2	Willy Derboven (BEL)	G.B.C.–Libertas	+ 1"
3	Rik Van Looy (BEL)	G.B.C.–Libertas	+ 2"
4	Gilbert Desmet (BEL)	Wiel's–Groene Leeuw	+ 4"
5	Michel Van Aerde (BEL)	Solo–Terrot	s.t.
6	Willy Bocklant (BEL)	Flandria–Faema	s.t.
7	Jean Simon (BEL)	Peugeot–BP–Englebert	s.t.
8	Arthur Decabooter (BEL)	Solo–Terrot	s.t.
9	Jean Gainche (FRA)	Mercier–BP–Hutchinson	s.t.
10	André Darrigade (FRA)	Margnat–Paloma–Dunlop	s.t.

General classification after stage 4

Rank	Rider	Team	Time
1	Seamus Elliott (IRL)	Saint-Raphaël–Gitane–R. Geminiani	21h 15' 58"
2	Henry Anglade (FRA)	Pelforth–Sauvage–Lejeune	+ 1' 14"
3	Guillaume Van Tongerloo (BEL)	G.B.C.–Libertas	+ 1' 30"
4	Gilbert Desmet (BEL)	Wiel's–Groene Leeuw	+ 1' 35"
5	Luis Otaño (ESP)	Margnat–Paloma–Dunlop	+ 2' 28"
6	Jean Stablinski (FRA)	Saint-Raphaël–Gitane–R. Geminiani	+ 6' 03"
7	Antonio Suárez (ESP)	Flandria–Faema	+ 6' 19"
8	Eddy Pauwels (BEL)	Wiel's–Groene Leeuw	+ 7' 18"
9	Michel Van Aerde (BEL)	Solo–Terrot	+ 7' 27"
10	Edgard Sorgeloos (BEL)	G.B.C.–Libertas	+ 7' 48"

== Stage 5 ==
27 June 1963 - Rouen to Rennes, 285 km (177 mi)

Stage 5 result

Rank	Rider	Team	Time
1	Antonio Bailetti (ITA)	Carpano	7h 15' 34"
2	Danilo Ferrari (ITA)	IBAC	s.t.
3	Jan Janssen (NED)	Pelforth–Sauvage–Lejeune	s.t.
4	Huub Zilverberg (NED)	G.B.C.–Libertas	s.t.
5	Frans Brands (BEL)	Flandria–Faema	s.t.
6	Daniel Doom (BEL)	Wiel's–Groene Leeuw	s.t.
7	Rik Van Looy (BEL)	G.B.C.–Libertas	+ 10"
8	Michel Van Aerde (BEL)	Solo–Terrot	s.t.
9	André Darrigade (FRA)	Margnat–Paloma–Dunlop	s.t.
10	Jean Graczyk (FRA)	Margnat–Paloma–Dunlop	s.t.

General classification after stage 5

Rank	Rider	Team	Time
1	Seamus Elliott (IRL)	Saint-Raphaël–Gitane–R. Geminiani	28h 31' 42"
2	Henry Anglade (FRA)	Pelforth–Sauvage–Lejeune	+ 1' 14"
3	Guillaume Van Tongerloo (BEL)	G.B.C.–Libertas	+ 1' 30"
4	Gilbert Desmet (BEL)	Wiel's–Groene Leeuw	+ 1' 35"
5	Luis Otaño (ESP)	Margnat–Paloma–Dunlop	+ 2' 28"
6	Jean Stablinski (FRA)	Saint-Raphaël–Gitane–R. Geminiani	+ 6' 03"
7	Antonio Suárez (ESP)	Flandria–Faema	+ 6' 19"
8	Eddy Pauwels (BEL)	Wiel's–Groene Leeuw	+ 7' 18"
9	Michel Van Aerde (BEL)	Solo–Terrot	+ 7' 27"
10	Edgard Sorgeloos (BEL)	G.B.C.–Libertas	+ 7' 48"

== Stage 6a ==
28 June 1963 - Rennes to Angers, 118 km (73 mi)

Stage 6a result

Rank	Rider	Team	Time
1	Roger De Breuker (BEL)	Solo–Terrot	2h 44' 05"
2	Willy Vannitsen (BEL)	Peugeot–BP–Englebert	+ 1"
3	Rik Van Looy (BEL)	G.B.C.–Libertas	s.t.
4	Jan Janssen (NED)	Pelforth–Sauvage–Lejeune	s.t.
5	Gilbert Desmet (BEL)	Wiel's–Groene Leeuw	s.t.
6	Arthur Decabooter (BEL)	Solo–Terrot	s.t.
7	Vendramino Bariviera (ITA)	Carpano	s.t.
8	Frans Melckenbeeck (BEL)	Mercier–BP–Hutchinson	s.t.
9	Noël Foré (BEL)	Flandria–Faema	s.t.
10	Benoni Beheyt (BEL)	Wiel's–Groene Leeuw	s.t.

General classification after stage 6a

Rank	Rider	Team	Time
1	Seamus Elliott (IRL)	Saint-Raphaël–Gitane–R. Geminiani	31h 15' 48"
2	Henry Anglade (FRA)	Pelforth–Sauvage–Lejeune	+ 1' 14"
3	Guillaume Van Tongerloo (BEL)	G.B.C.–Libertas	+ 1' 30"
4	Gilbert Desmet (BEL)	Wiel's–Groene Leeuw	+ 1' 35"
5	Luis Otaño (ESP)	Margnat–Paloma–Dunlop	+ 2' 28"
6	Jean Stablinski (FRA)	Saint-Raphaël–Gitane–R. Geminiani	+ 6' 03"
7	Antonio Suárez (ESP)	Flandria–Faema	+ 6' 19"
8	Eddy Pauwels (BEL)	Wiel's–Groene Leeuw	+ 7' 18"
9	Michel Van Aerde (BEL)	Solo–Terrot	+ 7' 27"
10	Edgard Sorgeloos (BEL)	G.B.C.–Libertas	+ 7' 48"

== Stage 6b ==
28 June 1963 - Angers, 25 km (16 mi) (ITT)

Stage 6b result

Rank	Rider	Team	Time
1	Jacques Anquetil (FRA)	Saint-Raphaël–Gitane–R. Geminiani	31' 58"
2	Raymond Poulidor (FRA)	Mercier–BP–Hutchinson	+ 45"
3	Gilbert Desmet (BEL)	Wiel's–Groene Leeuw	+ 55"
4	Jef Planckaert (BEL)	Flandria–Faema	+ 1' 03"
5	Ferdinand Bracke (BEL)	Peugeot–BP–Englebert	+ 1' 09"
6	Joseph Velly (FRA)	Margnat–Paloma–Dunlop	1' 18"
7	Henry Anglade (FRA)	Pelforth–Sauvage–Lejeune	+ 1' 22"
8	Angelino Soler (ESP)	Flandria–Faema	1' 30"
9	Miguel Pacheco (ESP)	Kas–Kaskol	+ 1' 37"
10	Federico Bahamontes (ESP)	Margnat–Paloma–Dunlop	+ 1' 38"

General classification after stage 6b

Rank	Rider	Team	Time
1	Gilbert Desmet (BEL)	Wiel's–Groene Leeuw	31h 50' 16"
2	Henry Anglade (FRA)	Pelforth–Sauvage–Lejeune	+ 6"
3	Seamus Elliott (IRL)	Saint-Raphaël–Gitane–R. Geminiani	+ 1' 02"
4	Guillaume Van Tongerloo (BEL)	G.B.C.–Libertas	+ 1' 44"
5	Luis Otaño (ESP)	Margnat–Paloma–Dunlop	+ 2' 13"
6	Jean Stablinski (FRA)	Saint-Raphaël–Gitane–R. Geminiani	+ 5' 57"
7	Jacques Anquetil (FRA)	Saint-Raphaël–Gitane–R. Geminiani	+ 6' 14"
8	Antonio Suárez (ESP)	Flandria–Faema	s.t.
9	Eddy Pauwels (BEL)	Wiel's–Groene Leeuw	+ 7' 29"
10	Federico Bahamontes (ESP)	Margnat–Paloma–Dunlop	+ 7' 33"

== Stage 7 ==
29 June 1963 - Angers to Limoges, 236 km (147 mi)

Stage 7 result

Rank	Rider	Team	Time
1	Jan Janssen (NED)	Pelforth–Sauvage–Lejeune	6h 01' 59"
2	Rik Van Looy (BEL)	G.B.C.–Libertas	+ 4"
3	Noël Foré (BEL)	Flandria–Faema	s.t.
4	Jean Graczyk (FRA)	Margnat–Paloma–Dunlop	s.t.
5	Michel Van Aerde (BEL)	Solo–Terrot	s.t.
6	Emile Daems (BEL)	Peugeot–BP–Englebert	s.t.
7	Willy Bocklant (BEL)	Flandria–Faema	s.t.
8	Benoni Beheyt (BEL)	Wiel's–Groene Leeuw	s.t.
9	Guy Ignolin (FRA)	Saint-Raphaël–Gitane–R. Geminiani	s.t.
10	Guido Carlesi (ITA)	IBAC	s.t.

General classification after stage 7

Rank	Rider	Team	Time
1	Gilbert Desmet (BEL)	Wiel's–Groene Leeuw	37h 52' 19"
2	Henry Anglade (FRA)	Pelforth–Sauvage–Lejeune	+ 6"
3	Seamus Elliott (IRL)	Saint-Raphaël–Gitane–R. Geminiani	+ 1' 02"
4	Guillaume Van Tongerloo (BEL)	G.B.C.–Libertas	+ 1' 44"
5	Luis Otaño (ESP)	Margnat–Paloma–Dunlop	+ 2' 13"
6	Jean Stablinski (FRA)	Saint-Raphaël–Gitane–R. Geminiani	+ 5' 57"
7	Jacques Anquetil (FRA)	Saint-Raphaël–Gitane–R. Geminiani	+ 6' 14"
8	Antonio Suárez (ESP)	Flandria–Faema	s.t.
9	Eddy Pauwels (BEL)	Wiel's–Groene Leeuw	+ 7' 29"
10	Federico Bahamontes (ESP)	Margnat–Paloma–Dunlop	+ 7' 33"

== Stage 8 ==
30 June 1963 - Limoges to Bordeaux, 232 km (144 mi)

Stage 8 result

Rank	Rider	Team	Time
1	Rik Van Looy (BEL)	G.B.C.–Libertas	5h 34' 20"
2	Noël Foré (BEL)	Flandria–Faema	s.t.
3	Michel Van Aerde (BEL)	Solo–Terrot	s.t.
4	André Darrigade (FRA)	Margnat–Paloma–Dunlop	s.t.
5	Jan Janssen (NED)	Pelforth–Sauvage–Lejeune	s.t.
6	Gilbert Desmet (BEL)	Wiel's–Groene Leeuw	s.t.
7	Arthur Decabooter (BEL)	Solo–Terrot	s.t.
8	Jean Graczyk (FRA)	Margnat–Paloma–Dunlop	s.t.
9	Jean Gainche (FRA)	Mercier–BP–Hutchinson	s.t.
10	Frans Aerenhouts (BEL)	G.B.C.–Libertas	s.t.

General classification after stage 8

Rank	Rider	Team	Time
1	Gilbert Desmet (BEL)	Wiel's–Groene Leeuw	43h 26' 39"
2	Henry Anglade (FRA)	Pelforth–Sauvage–Lejeune	+ 6"
3	Seamus Elliott (IRL)	Saint-Raphaël–Gitane–R. Geminiani	+ 1' 02"
4	Guillaume Van Tongerloo (BEL)	G.B.C.–Libertas	+ 1' 44"
5	Luis Otaño (ESP)	Margnat–Paloma–Dunlop	+ 2' 13"
6	Jean Stablinski (FRA)	Saint-Raphaël–Gitane–R. Geminiani	+ 5' 57"
7	Jacques Anquetil (FRA)	Saint-Raphaël–Gitane–R. Geminiani	+ 6' 14"
8	Antonio Suárez (ESP)	Flandria–Faema	s.t.
9	Rik Van Looy (BEL)	G.B.C.–Libertas	+ 6' 54"
10	Eddy Pauwels (BEL)	Wiel's–Groene Leeuw	+ 7' 29"

== Stage 9 ==
1 July 1963 - Bordeaux to Pau, 202 km (126 mi)

Stage 9 result

Rank	Rider	Team	Time
1	Pino Cerami (BEL)	Peugeot–BP–Englebert	4h 41' 57"
2	André Darrigade (FRA)	Margnat–Paloma–Dunlop	+ 1"
3	Joseph Groussard (FRA)	Pelforth–Sauvage–Lejeune	s.t.
4	Pierre Everaert (FRA)	Saint-Raphaël–Gitane–R. Geminiani	s.t.
5	Jean Simon (BEL)	Peugeot–BP–Englebert	s.t.
6	Robert Lelangue (BEL)	Solo–Terrot	s.t.
7	Pierre Beuffeuil (FRA)	Mercier–BP–Hutchinson	s.t.
8	Jean Graczyk (FRA)	Margnat–Paloma–Dunlop	s.t.
9	Rik Van Looy (BEL)	G.B.C.–Libertas	+ 3' 15"
10	Benoni Beheyt (BEL)	Wiel's–Groene Leeuw	s.t.

General classification after stage 9

Rank	Rider	Team	Time
1	Gilbert Desmet (BEL)	Wiel's–Groene Leeuw	48h 11' 51"
2	Henry Anglade (FRA)	Pelforth–Sauvage–Lejeune	+ 6"
3	Seamus Elliott (IRL)	Saint-Raphaël–Gitane–R. Geminiani	+ 1' 02"
4	Guillaume Van Tongerloo (BEL)	G.B.C.–Libertas	+ 1' 44"
5	Luis Otaño (ESP)	Margnat–Paloma–Dunlop	+ 2' 13"
6	Jean Stablinski (FRA)	Saint-Raphaël–Gitane–R. Geminiani	+ 5' 57"
7	André Darrigade (FRA)	Margnat–Paloma–Dunlop	+ 6' 04"
8	Jacques Anquetil (FRA)	Saint-Raphaël–Gitane–R. Geminiani	+ 6' 14"
9	Antonio Suárez (ESP)	Flandria–Faema	s.t.
10	Rik Van Looy (BEL)	G.B.C.–Libertas	+ 6' 54"

== Stage 10 ==
2 July 1963 - Pau to Bagnères-de-Bigorre, 148 km (92 mi)

Stage 10 result

Rank	Rider	Team	Time
1	Jacques Anquetil (FRA)	Saint-Raphaël–Gitane–R. Geminiani	4h 33' 49"
2	José Pérez Francés (ESP)	Ferrys	s.t.
3	Raymond Poulidor (FRA)	Mercier–BP–Hutchinson	s.t.
4	Federico Bahamontes (ESP)	Margnat–Paloma–Dunlop	s.t.
5	Esteban Martín (ESP)	Ferrys	+ 2"
6	Claude Mattio (FRA)	Margnat–Paloma–Dunlop	+ 1' 17"
7	Jean-Claude Lebaube (FRA)	Saint-Raphaël–Gitane–R. Geminiani	s.t.
8	Gilbert Desmet (BEL)	Wiel's–Groene Leeuw	+ 1' 28"
9	Angelino Soler (ESP)	Flandria–Faema	s.t.
10	Armand Desmet (BEL)	Flandria–Faema	s.t.

General classification after stage 10

Rank	Rider	Team	Time
1	Gilbert Desmet (BEL)	Wiel's–Groene Leeuw	52h 50' 37"
2	Henry Anglade (FRA)	Pelforth–Sauvage–Lejeune	+ 2' 57"
3	Jacques Anquetil (FRA)	Saint-Raphaël–Gitane–R. Geminiani	+ 3' 46"
4	Federico Bahamontes (ESP)	Margnat–Paloma–Dunlop	+ 6' 05"
5	Raymond Poulidor (FRA)	Mercier–BP–Hutchinson	+ 6' 16"
6	Eddy Pauwels (BEL)	Wiel's–Groene Leeuw	+ 7' 29"
7	Angelino Soler (ESP)	Flandria–Faema	+ 8' 30"
8	Jean-Claude Lebaube (FRA)	Saint-Raphaël–Gitane–R. Geminiani	+ 8' 59"
9	José Pérez Francés (ESP)	Ferrys	+ 9' 13"
10	Armand Desmet (BEL)	Flandria–Faema	+ 9' 48"
