= Tour de l'Aude =

Tour de l'Aude is the name of two cycling races:

- Tour de l'Aude (men's race)
- Tour de l'Aude Cycliste Féminin
