= 1963 Tour de France =

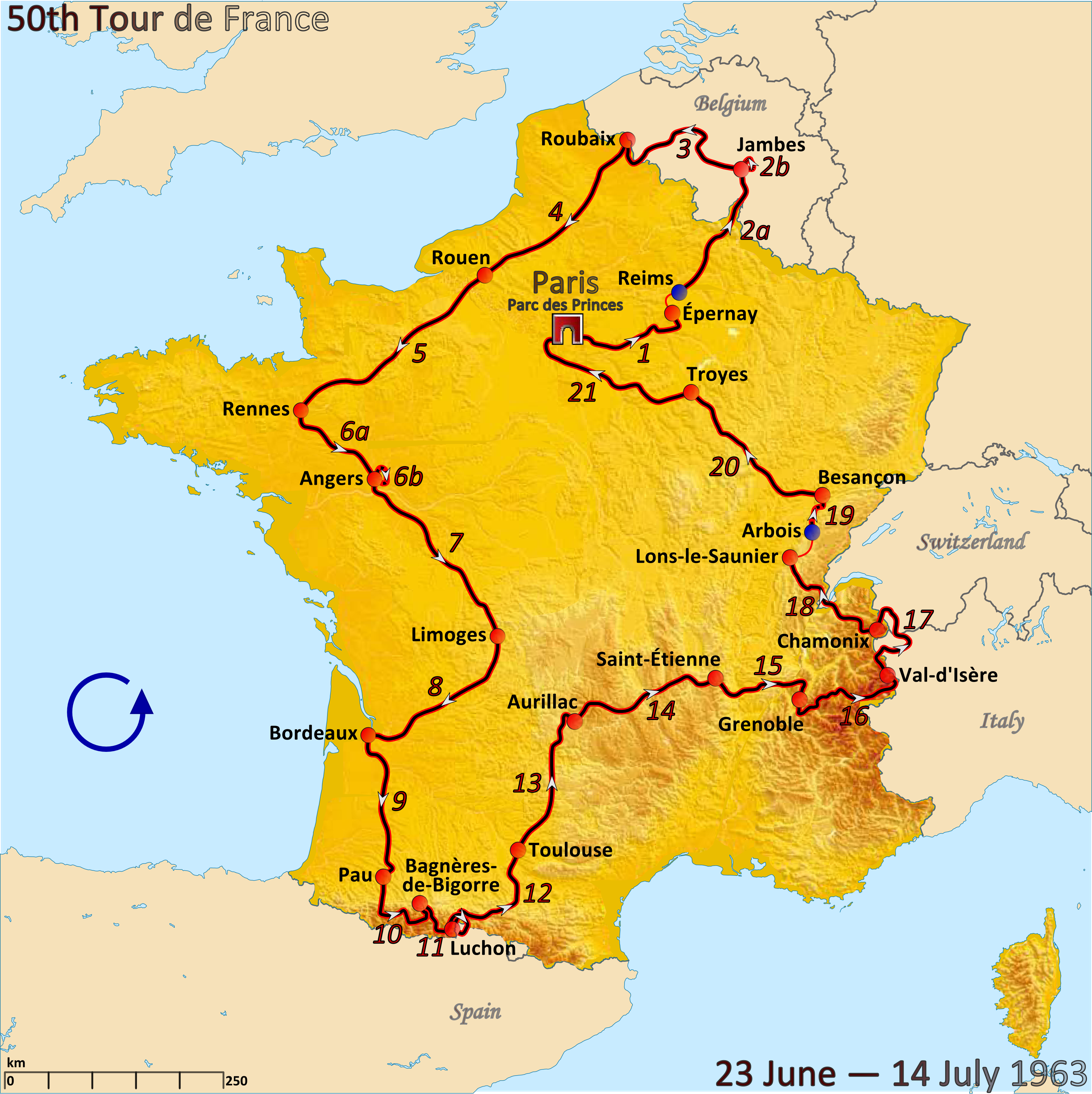
- Route of the 1963 Tour de France

Race details
- Dates: 23 June – 14 July 1963
- Stages: 21, including two split stages
- Distance: 4,138 km (2,571 mi)
- Winning time: 113h 30' 05"

Results
Jersey awarded to the overall winner	Winner	Jacques Anquetil (FRA)	(Saint-Raphaël–Gitane–R. Geminiani)
	Second	Federico Bahamontes (ESP)	(Margnat–Paloma–Dunlop)
	Third	José Pérez Francés (ESP)	(Ferrys)
Jersey awarded to the points classification winner	Points	Rik Van Looy (BEL)	(G.B.C.–Libertas)
	Mountains	Federico Bahamontes (ESP)	(Margnat–Paloma–Dunlop)
	Combativity	Rik Van Looy (BEL)	(G.B.C.–Gramaglia)
	Team	Saint-Raphaël–Gitane–R. Geminiani	

The 1963 Tour de France was the 50th edition of the Tour de France, one of cycling's Grand Tours. It took place between 23 June and 14 July, with 21 stages covering a distance of 4,138 km (2,571 mi). Stages 2 and 6 were both two part stages, the first half being a regular stage and the second half being a team or individual time trial.

The Tour organisers were trying to break the dominance of Jacques Anquetil, who had won already three Tours, by reducing the time trials length to only 79 km (49 mi), so that the climbing capabilities would be more important.

Nonetheless, the race was won by Anquetil, who was able to stay close to his main rival Federico Bahamontes in the mountains, one time even by faking a mechanical problem in order to get a bicycle that was more suited for the terrain. Bahamontes finished as the second-placed cyclist, but won the mountains classification. The points classification was won by Rik Van Looy.

== Teams ==
The 1963 Tour started with 130 cyclists, divided into 13 teams. The IBAC–Molteni team was a combination of five cyclists from IBAC and five from Molteni, each wearing their own sponsor's jerseys.

The teams entering the race were:

- Saint-Raphaël–Gitane–R. Geminiani
- Mercier–BP–Hutchinson
- Flandria–Faema
- Wiel's–Groene Leeuw
- Margnat–Paloma–Dunlop
- Carpano
- Pelforth–Sauvage–Lejeune
- Ferrys
- G.B.C.–Libertas
- IBAC–Molteni
- Kas–Kaskol
- Peugeot–BP–Englebert
- Solo–Terrot

== Pre-race favourites ==
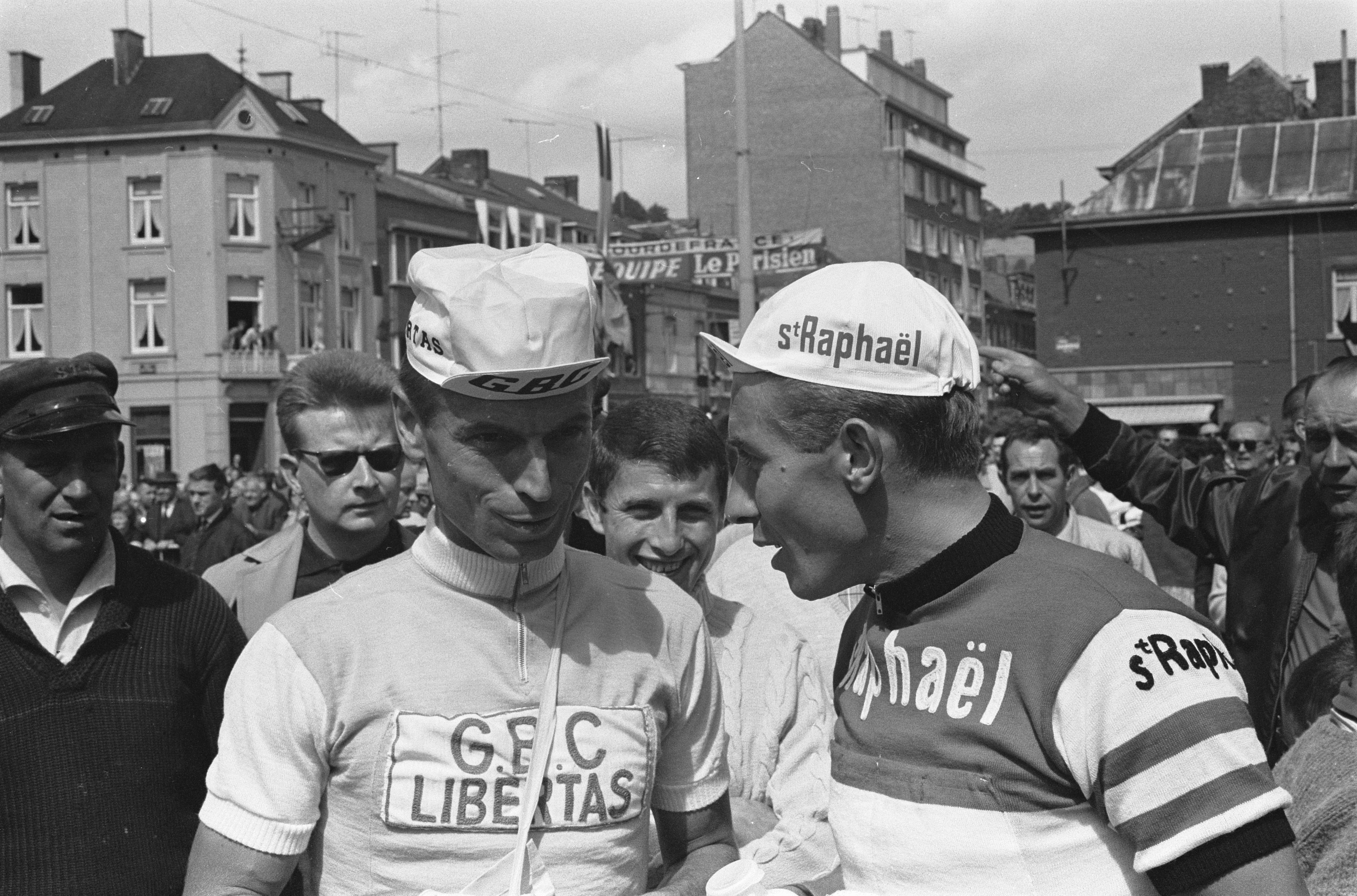
Rik Van Looy and the pre-race favourite Jacques Anquetil before the fifth stage

The main favourite before the race was Jacques Anquetil, at that moment already a three-time winner of the Tour, including the previous two editions. Anquetil had shown good form before the Tour, as he won Paris–Nice, the Dauphiné Libéré, the Critérium National and the 1963 Vuelta a España. Anquetil was not sure if he would ride the Tour until a few days before the start; he had been infected by a tapeworm, and was advised not to start. Anquetil had chosen to ride races with tough climbs, to prepare for the 1963 Tour de France.

The major competitor was thought to be Raymond Poulidor, who had shown his capabilities in the 1962 Tour de France.

== Route and stages ==
The 1963 Tour de France started on 23 June in Paris, and had one rest day, in Aurillac. The highest point of elevation in the race was 2,770 m (9,090 ft) at the summit of the Col de l'Iseran mountain pass on stage 16.

Stage characteristics and winners
Stage	Date	Course	Distance	Type	Winner
1	23 June	Paris to Épernay	152 km (94 mi)	Plain stage	Eddy Pauwels (BEL)
2a	24 June	Reims to Jambes (Belgium)	186 km (116 mi)	Plain stage	Rik Van Looy (BEL)
2b	24 June	Jambes (Belgium)	22 km (14 mi)	Team time trial	(France) Pelforth–Sauvage–Lejeune
3	25 June	Jambes (Belgium) to Roubaix	223 km (139 mi)	Plain stage	Seamus Elliott (IRL)
4	26 June	Roubaix to Rouen	236 km (147 mi)	Plain stage	Frans Melckenbeeck (BEL)
5	27 June	Rouen to Rennes	285 km (177 mi)	Plain stage	Antonio Bailetti (ITA)
6a	28 June	Rennes to Angers	118 km (73 mi)	Plain stage	Roger de Breuker (BEL)
6b	28 June	Angers	25 km (16 mi)	Individual time trial	Jacques Anquetil (FRA)
7	29 June	Angers to Limoges	236 km (147 mi)	Plain stage	Jan Janssen (NED)
8	30 June	Limoges to Bordeaux	232 km (144 mi)	Plain stage	Rik Van Looy (BEL)
9	1 July	Bordeaux to Pau	202 km (126 mi)	Plain stage	Pino Cerami (BEL)
10	2 July	Pau to Bagnères-de-Bigorre	148 km (92 mi)	Stage with mountain(s)	Jacques Anquetil (FRA)
11	3 July	Bagnères-de-Bigorre to Luchon	131 km (81 mi)	Stage with mountain(s)	Guy Ignolin (FRA)
12	4 July	Luchon to Toulouse	173 km (107 mi)	Stage with mountain(s)	André Darrigade (FRA)
13	5 July	Toulouse to Aurillac	234 km (145 mi)	Plain stage	Rik Van Looy (BEL)
	6 July	Aurillac		Rest day	
14	7 July	Aurillac to Saint-Étienne	237 km (147 mi)	Plain stage	Guy Ignolin (FRA)
15	8 July	Saint-Étienne to Grenoble	174 km (108 mi)	Stage with mountain(s)	Federico Bahamontes (ESP)
16	9 July	Grenoble to Val d'Isère	202 km (126 mi)	Stage with mountain(s)	Fernando Manzaneque (ESP)
17	10 July	Val d'Isère to Chamonix	228 km (142 mi)	Stage with mountain(s)	Jacques Anquetil (FRA)
18	11 July	Chamonix to Lons-le-Saunier	225 km (140 mi)	Stage with mountain(s)	Frans Brands (BEL)
19	12 July	Arbois to Besançon	54 km (34 mi)	Individual time trial	Jacques Anquetil (FRA)
20	13 July	Besançon to Troyes	234 km (145 mi)	Plain stage	Roger de Breuker (BEL)
21	14 July	Troyes to Paris	185 km (115 mi)	Plain stage	Rik Van Looy (BEL)
	Total		4,138 km (2,571 mi)		

== Race overview ==
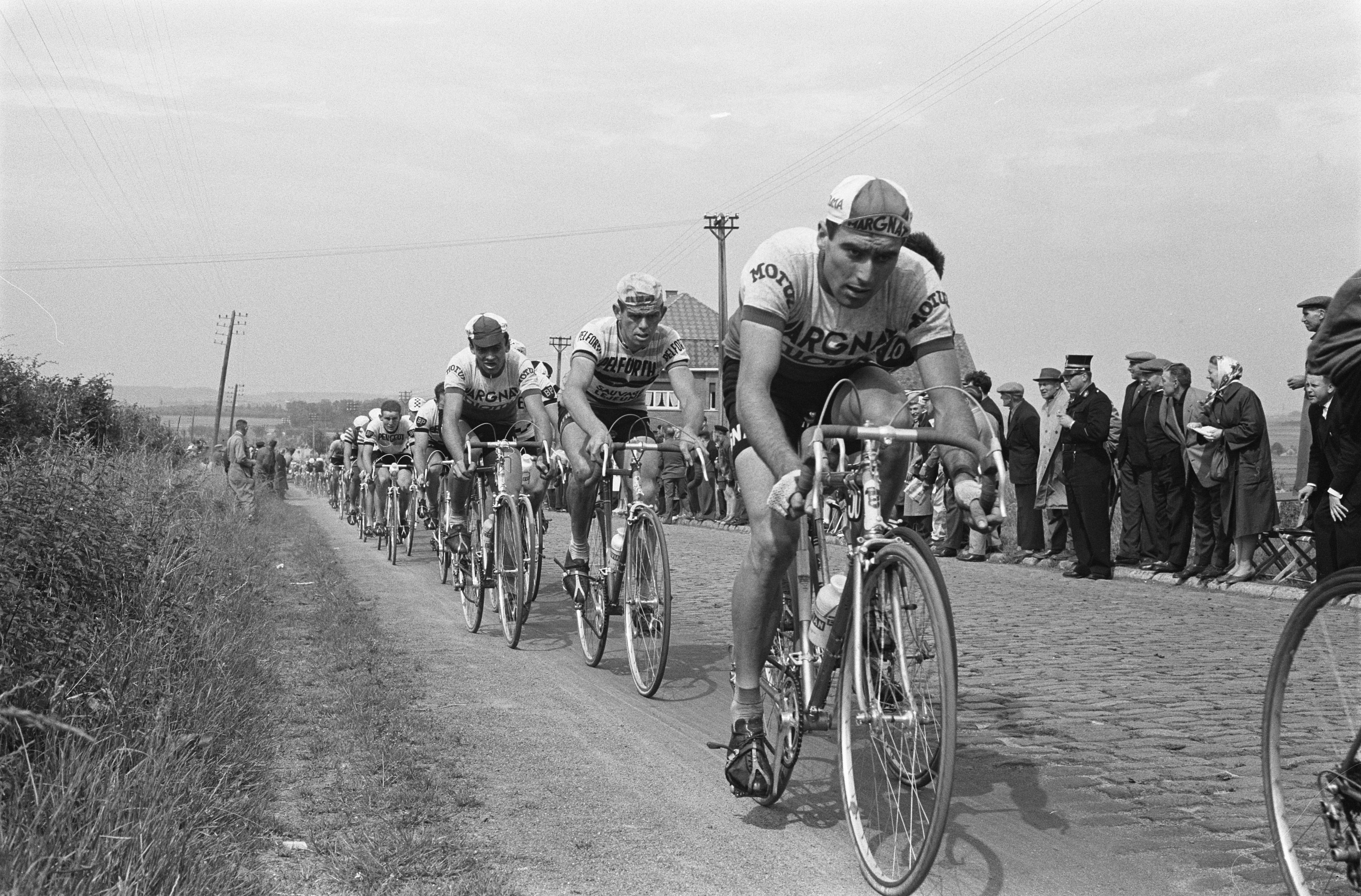
Riders during the fourth stage between Roubaix and Rouen

In the first stage, four men escaped. One of them was Federico Bahamontes, the winner of the 1959 Tour de France. Bahamontes was known as a climber, so it was unexpected that he gained time on a flat stage. The third stage saw another successful breakaway. Seamus Elliott won the stage, and became the new leader in the race; it was the first time that an Irish cyclist led the Tour de France.

The time trial in stage 6b was won by Anquetil, with Poulidor in second place. Gilbert Desmet became the new leader. The situation did not change much in the next stages until the stages in the Pyrenees, starting with the tenth stage. Bahamontes lead the first group, but Anquetil was able to stay in that first group, which was a surprise. Anquetil stayed in that first group until the finish, where he outsprinted the rest to win his first mountain stage. In the other two stages in the Pyrenees, Anquetil was able to stay in the first group, lost little time on his competitors, and kept getting closer to Desmet, who was still leading the general classification.

The fifteenth stage was the first in the Alps. Bahamontes won this stage, and in the general classification jumped to second place, three seconds ahead of Anquetil. In the sixteenth stage, Fernando Manzaneque won, eight minutes ahead of Bahamontes and Anquetil who stayed together. Because Desmet was further behind, Bahamontes became the new leader of the race, with a margin of three seconds on Anquetil.

The race was decided in the seventeenth stage. The rules in 1963 did not allow cyclists to change bicycles, unless there was a mechanical problem. Anquetil's team director, Raphaël Géminiani, thought that Anquetil could use a different bicycle on the ascent of the Col de la Forclaz, so he advised Anquetil to fake a mechanical problem on the start of that climb; Géminiani cut through a gear cable, and claimed that it snapped. Anquetil could thus use a light bicycle with lower gears, especially suited for a climb, which gave him an advantage on his competitors. Bahamontes reached the top of the Forclaz first, and only Anquetil had been able to follow him. After the top, Anquetil got his regular bicycle back, and rode to the finish together with Bahamontes. Anquetil won the sprint, and the bonus time made him the new leader. As expected, Anquetil won some more time in the time trial in stage 19, and became the winner of the 1963 Tour.

== Classification leadership and minor prizes ==
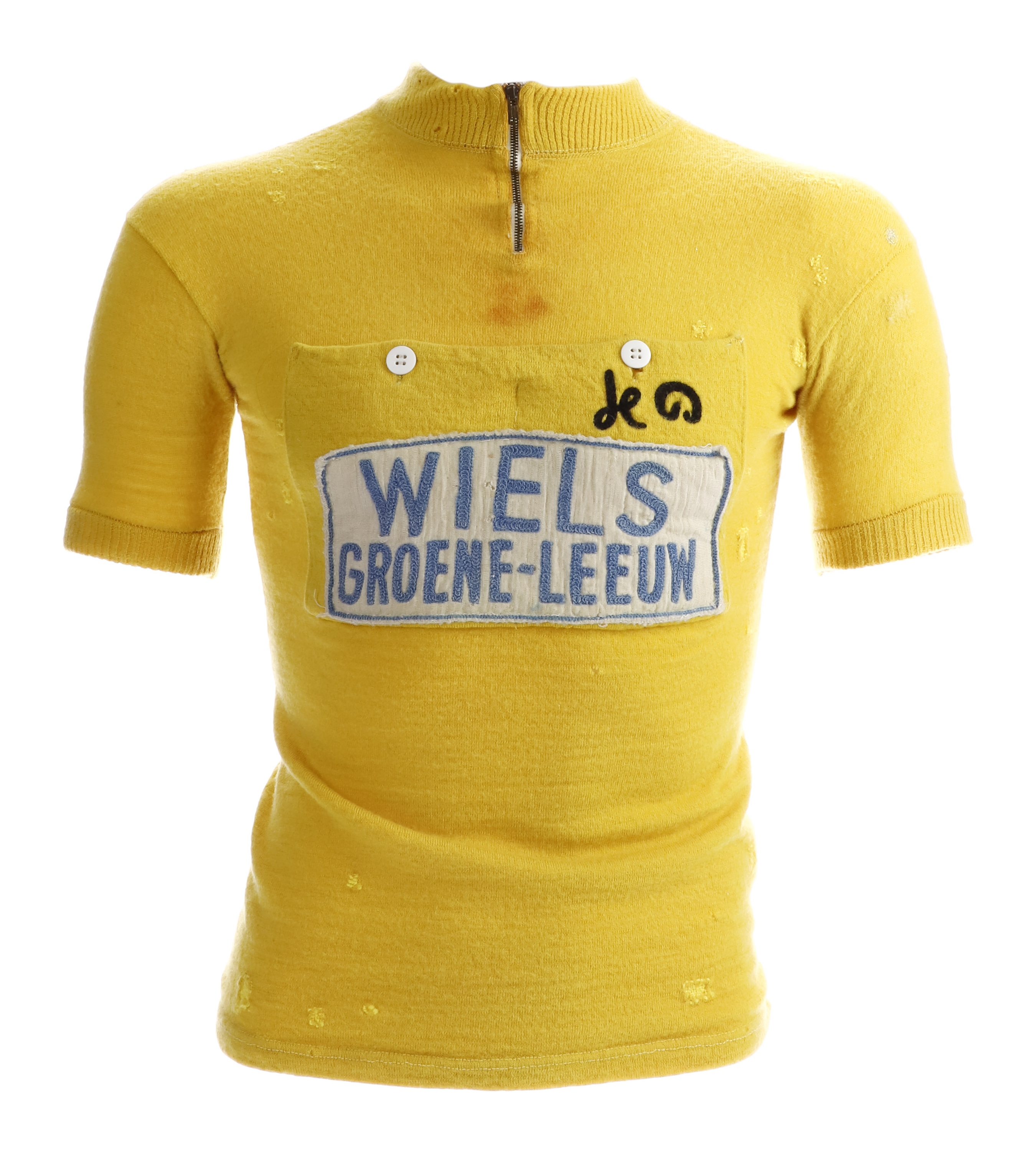
The yellow jersey worn by Gilbert Desmet as leader of the general classification

There were several classifications in the 1963 Tour de France, two of them awarding jerseys to their leaders. The most important was the general classification, calculated by adding each cyclist's finishing times on each stage. The cyclist with the least accumulated time was the race leader, identified by the yellow jersey; the winner of this classification is considered the winner of the Tour.

Additionally, there was a points classification. In the points classification, cyclists got points for finishing among the best in a stage finish. The cyclist with the most points lead the classification, and was identified with a green jersey.

There was also a mountains classification. The organisation had categorised some climbs as either first, second, third, or fourth-category; points for this classification were won by the first cyclists that reached the top of these climbs first, with more points available for the higher-categorised climbs. The cyclist with the most points lead the classification, but was not identified with a jersey.

For the team classification, the times of the best three cyclists per team on each stage were added; the leading team was the team with the lowest total time. The riders in the team that led this classification wore yellow caps. Carpano and the combined team IBAC-Molteni did not finish with three or more cyclists, so they were not included in the team classification.

In addition, there was a combativity award, in which a jury composed of journalists gave points after each stage to the cyclist they considered most combative. The split stages each had a combined winner. At the conclusion of the Tour, Rik Van Looy won the overall super-combativity award, also decided by journalists.

Classification leadership by stage
Stage	Winner	General classification	Points classification	Mountains classification (Note: No jersey was awarded to the leader of the mountains classification until a white jersey with red polka dots was introduced in 1975.)	Team classification	Combativity award
1	Eddy Pauwels	Eddy Pauwels	Eddy Pauwels	no award	G.B.C.–Libertas	Federico Bahamontes
2a	Rik Van Looy	Eddy Pauwels	Rik Van Looy	no award	Pelforth–Sauvage–Lejeune	Rik Van Looy
2b	Pelforth–Sauvage–Lejeune	Eddy Pauwels	Rik Van Looy	no award	Pelforth–Sauvage–Lejeune	Rik Van Looy
3	Seamus Elliott	Seamus Elliott	Rik Van Looy	no award	Pelforth–Sauvage–Lejeune	Henry Anglade
4	Frans Melckenbeeck	Seamus Elliott	Rik Van Looy	no award	Pelforth–Sauvage–Lejeune	Roland Lacombe
5	Antonio Bailetti	Seamus Elliott	Rik Van Looy	no award	Pelforth–Sauvage–Lejeune	Antonio Bailetti
6a	Roger de Breuker	Seamus Elliott	Rik Van Looy	no award	Pelforth–Sauvage–Lejeune	Raymond Poulidor
6b	Jacques Anquetil	Gilbert Desmet	Rik Van Looy	no award	Saint-Raphaël–Gitane–R. Geminiani	Raymond Poulidor
7	Jan Janssen	Gilbert Desmet	Rik Van Looy	no award	Saint-Raphaël–Gitane–R. Geminiani	Rik Van Looy
8	Rik Van Looy	Gilbert Desmet	Rik Van Looy	no award	Saint-Raphaël–Gitane–R. Geminiani	Willy Bocklant
9	Pino Cerami	Gilbert Desmet	Rik Van Looy	no award	Saint-Raphaël–Gitane–R. Geminiani	André Darrigade
10	Jacques Anquetil	Gilbert Desmet	Rik Van Looy	Federico Bahamontes	Saint-Raphaël–Gitane–R. Geminiani	Federico Bahamontes
11	Guy Ignolin	Gilbert Desmet	Rik Van Looy	Federico Bahamontes	Saint-Raphaël–Gitane–R. Geminiani	Guy Ignolin
12	André Darrigade	Gilbert Desmet	Rik Van Looy	Federico Bahamontes	Saint-Raphaël–Gitane–R. Geminiani	Claude Mattio
13	Rik Van Looy	Gilbert Desmet	Rik Van Looy	Federico Bahamontes	Saint-Raphaël–Gitane–R. Geminiani	Rik Van Looy
14	Guy Ignolin	Gilbert Desmet	Rik Van Looy	Federico Bahamontes	Saint-Raphaël–Gitane–R. Geminiani	Henry Anglade
15	Federico Bahamontes	Gilbert Desmet	Rik Van Looy	Federico Bahamontes	Saint-Raphaël–Gitane–R. Geminiani	Federico Bahamontes
16	Fernando Manzaneque	Federico Bahamontes	Rik Van Looy	Federico Bahamontes	Saint-Raphaël–Gitane–R. Geminiani	Fernando Manzaneque
17	Jacques Anquetil	Jacques Anquetil	Rik Van Looy	Federico Bahamontes	Saint-Raphaël–Gitane–R. Geminiani	Federico Bahamontes
18	Frans Brands	Jacques Anquetil	Rik Van Looy	Federico Bahamontes	Saint-Raphaël–Gitane–R. Geminiani	Frans Brands
19	Jacques Anquetil	Jacques Anquetil	Rik Van Looy	Federico Bahamontes	Saint-Raphaël–Gitane–R. Geminiani	Ferdinand Bracke
20	Roger de Breuker	Jacques Anquetil	Rik Van Looy	Federico Bahamontes	Saint-Raphaël–Gitane–R. Geminiani	Joseph Groussard
21	Rik Van Looy	Jacques Anquetil	Rik Van Looy	Federico Bahamontes	Saint-Raphaël–Gitane–R. Geminiani	François Mahé
Final		Jacques Anquetil	Rik Van Looy	Federico Bahamontes	Saint-Raphaël–Gitane–R. Geminiani	Rik Van Looy

== Final standings ==
=== General classification ===
Final general classification (1–10)
Rank	Rider	Team	Time
1	Jacques Anquetil (FRA)	Saint-Raphaël–Gitane–R. Geminiani	113h 30' 05"
2	Federico Bahamontes (ESP)	Margnat–Paloma–Dunlop	+ 3' 35"
3	José Pérez Francés (ESP)	Ferrys	+ 10' 14"
4	Jean-Claude Lebaube (FRA)	Saint-Raphaël–Gitane–R. Geminiani	+ 11' 55"
5	Armand Desmet (BEL)	Flandria–Faema	+ 15' 00"
6	Angelino Soler (ESP)	Flandria–Faema	+ 15' 04"
7	Renzo Fontona (ITA)	IBAC–Molteni	+ 15' 27"
8	Raymond Poulidor (FRA)	Mercier–BP–Hutchinson	+ 16' 46"
9	Hans Junkermann (FRG)	Wiel's–Groene Leeuw	+ 18' 53"
10	Rik Van Looy (BEL)	G.B.C.–Libertas	+ 19' 24"

Final general classification (11–76)
Rank	Rider	Team	Time
11	Henry Anglade (FRA)	Pelforth–Sauvage–Lejeune	+ 21' 39"
12	Fernando Manzaneque (ESP)	Ferrys	+ 22' 30"
13	Eddy Pauwels (BEL)	Wiel's–Groene Leeuw	+ 25' 03"
14	Francisco Gabica (ESP)	Kas–Kaskol	+ 26' 44"
15	Dieter Puschel (FRG)	Wiel's–Groene Leeuw	+ 28' 20"
16	Alan Ramsbottom (GBR)	Pelforth–Sauvage–Lejeune	+ 30' 36"
17	Michel Pacheco (ESP)	Kas–Kaskol	+ 31' 36"
18	Graziano Battistini (ITA)	IBAC–Molteni	+ 32' 06
19	François Mahé (FRA)	Pelforth–Sauvage–Lejeune	+ 33' 50"
20	Jean Gainche (FRA)	Mercier–BP–Hutchinson	+ 35' 38"
21	Ferdinand Bracke (BEL)	Peugeot–BP–Englebert	+ 39' 52"
22	Victor Van Schil (BEL)	Mercier–BP–Hutchinson	+ 41' 05"
23	Jos Hoevenaers (BEL)	Peugeot–BP–Englebert	+ 42' 22"
24	Albertus Geldermans (NED)	Saint-Raphaël–Gitane–R. Geminiani	+ 43' 02"
25	Frans Brands (BEL)	Flandria–Faema	+ 45' 00"
26	Henri Duez (FRA)	Peugeot–BP–Englebert	+ 49' 21"
27	Rogelio Hernández (ESP)	Ferrys	+ 54' 22"
28	Jean Dotto (FRA)	Margnat–Paloma–Dunlop	+ 55' 07"
29	Antonio Gómez del Moral (ESP)	Flandria–Faema	+ 55' 41"
30	Robert Cazala (FRA)	Mercier–BP–Hutchinson	+ 56' 42"
31	Gérard Thiélin (FRA)	Saint-Raphaël–Gitane–R. Geminiani	+ 57' 14"
32	Esteban Martín (ESP)	Ferrys	+ 1h 02' 50"
33	Henri Dewolf (BEL)	Solo–Terrot	+ 1h 03' 28"
34	Dick Enthoven (NED)	Pelforth–Sauvage–Lejeune	+ 1h 05' 26"
35	Antonio Bertrán (ESP)	Ferrys	+ 1h 07' 26"
36	Sebastián Elorza (ESP)	Kas–Kaskol	+ 1h 08' 35"
37	Guy Ignolin (FRA)	Saint-Raphaël–Gitane–R. Geminiani	+ 1h 09' 15"
38	Luis Otaño (ESP)	Margnat–Paloma–Dunlop	+ 1h 09' 40"
39	Ludo Janssens (BEL)	G.B.C.–Libertas	+ 1h 10' 37"
40	Gabriel Mas (ESP)	Ferrys	+ 1h 12' 25"
41	Emilio Cruz (ESP)	Ferrys	+ 1h 16' 46"
42	Frans Aerenhouts (BEL)	G.B.C.–Libertas	+ 1h 20' 41"
43	Antonio Suárez (ESP)	Flandria–Faema	+ 1h 22' 10"
44	Gilbert Desmet (BEL)	Wiel's–Groene Leeuw	+ 1h 25' 01"
45	Van Tongerloo (BEL)	G.B.C.–Libertas	+ 1h 26' 54"
46	Juan Campillo (ESP)	Margnat–Paloma–Dunlop	+ 1h 27' 34"
47	Pierre Beuffeuil (FRA)	Mercier–BP–Hutchinson	+ 1h 27' 53"
48	Guy Epaud (FRA)	Pelforth–Sauvage–Lejeune	+ 1h 29' 26"
49	Benoni Beheyt (BEL)	Wiel's–Groene Leeuw	+ 1h 31' 28"
50	Valentín Uriona (ESP)	Kas–Kaskol	+ 1h 32' 05"
51	Georges Groussard (FRA)	Pelforth–Sauvage–Lejeune	+ 1h 32' 08"
52	Claude Mattio (FRA)	Margnat–Paloma–Dunlop	+ 1h 32' 20"
53	Loris Guernieri (ITA)	Carpano	+ 1h 33' 34"
54	Antonio Karmany (ESP)	Ferrys	+ 1h 35' 50"
55	Antonio Bailetti (ITA)	Carpano	+ 1h 36' 09"
56	Martin Van Geneugden (BEL)	G.B.C.–Libertas	+ 1h 42' 39"
57	André Foucher (FRA)	Pelforth–Sauvage–Lejeune	+ 1h 46' 41"
58	Marcel Ongenae (BEL)	Flandria–Faema	+ 1h 46' 41"
59	Anatole Novak (FRA)	Saint-Raphaël–Gitane–R. Geminiani	+ 1h 48' 24"
60	Alfons Hellemans (BEL)	Mercier–BP–Hutchinson	+ 1h 53' 09"
61	Seamus Elliott (IRL)	Saint-Raphaël–Gitane–R. Geminiani	+ 1h 54' 20"
62	Joseph Thomin (FRA)	Margnat–Paloma–Dunlop	+ 1h 56' 31"
63	Pierre Everaert (FRA)	Saint-Raphaël–Gitane–R. Geminiani	+ 1h 58' 37"
64	Joseph Groussard (FRA)	Pelforth–Sauvage–Lejeune	+ 2h 02' 08"
65	Louis Proost (BEL)	Solo–Terrot	+ 2h 02' 38"
66	Raymond Impanis (BEL)	Peugeot–BP–Englebert	+ 2h 04' 50"
67	Emile Daems (BEL)	Peugeot–BP–Englebert	+ 2h 06' 46"
68	Jean Milesi (FRA)	Mercier–BP–Hutchinson	+ 2h 10' 26"
69	Robert Lelangue (BEL)	Solo–Terrot	+ 2h 14' 47"
70	Jean Simon (BEL)	Peugeot–BP–Englebert	+ 2h 17' 58"
71	Raúl Rey (ESP)	Ferrys	+ 2h 21' 17"
72	Jean Graczyk (FRA)	Margnat–Paloma–Dunlop	+ 2h 22' 31"
73	Roger De Breucker (BEL)	Solo–Terrot	+ 2h 22' 42"
74	August Verhaegen (BEL)	Mercier–BP–Hutchinson	+ 2h 26' 00"
75	Julio San Emeterio (ESP)	Ferrys	+ 2h 28' 19"
76	Willy Derboven (BEL)	G.B.C.–Libertas	+ 2h 45' 10"

=== Points classification ===
Final points classification (1–10)
Rank	Rider	Team	Points
1	Rik Van Looy (BEL)	G.B.C.–Libertas	275
2	Jacques Anquetil (FRA)	Saint-Raphaël–Gitane–R. Geminiani	138
3	Federico Bahamontes (ESP)	Margnat–Paloma–Dunlop	112
4	Benoni Beheyt (BEL)	Wiel's–Groene Leeuw	111
5	José Pérez Francés (ESP)	Ferrys	81
6	Jean Gainche (FRA)	Mercier–BP–Hutchinson	78
7	Raymond Poulidor (FRA)	Mercier–BP–Hutchinson	77
8	Guy Ignolin (FRA)	Saint-Raphaël–Gitane–R. Geminiani	65
9	Jean Graczyk (FRA)	Margnat–Paloma–Dunlop	64
10	Willy Derboven (BEL)	G.B.C.–Libertas	54
10	Frans Brands (BEL)	Flandria–Faema	54

=== Mountains classification ===
Final mountains classification (1–10)
Rank	Rider	Team	Points
1	Federico Bahamontes (ESP)	Margnat–Paloma–Dunlop	147
2	Raymond Poulidor (FRA)	Mercier–BP–Hutchinson	70
3	Guy Ignolin (FRA)	Saint-Raphaël–Gitane–R. Geminiani	68
4	Claude Mattio (FRA)	Margnat–Paloma–Dunlop	51
5	Jacques Anquetil (FRA)	Saint-Raphaël–Gitane–R. Geminiani	47
6	Eddy Pauwels (BEL)	Wiel's–Groene Leeuw	46
7	Guy Epaud (FRA)	Pelforth–Sauvage–Lejeune	38
8	Renzo Fontona (ITA)	IBAC–Molteni	33
9	Armand Desmet (BEL)	Flandria–Faema	29
10	Angelino Soler (ESP)	Flandria–Faema	27

=== Team classification ===
Final team classification
Rank	Team	Time
1	Saint-Raphaël–Gitane–R. Geminiani	340h 35' 25"
2	Pelforth–Sauvage–Lejeune	+ 36' 49"
3	Flandria–Faema	+ 43' 13"
4	Wiel's–Groene Leeuw	+ 59' 03"
4	Ferrys	+ 59' 03"
6	Margnat–Paloma–Dunlop	+ 1h 04' 21"
7	Mercier–BP–Hutchinson	+ 1h 24' 34"
8	Peugeot–BP–Englebert	+ 1h 42' 13"
9	Kas–Kaskol	+ 1h 56' 08"
10	G.B.C.–Libertas	+ 2h 05' 26"
11	Solo–Terrot	+ 4h 18' 36"

== Aftermath ==
Anquetil, who had been criticized that he just a time trial specialist, showed that he was also capable of mountain stages, and everybody agreed that Anquetil was the best cyclist overall. Anquetil was the first cyclist to win a fourth Tour de France. In the next year, he set the record sharper by winning his fifth Tour. The French public had expected much from Raymond Poulidor, but Poulidor only made the eighth place. Normally, Poulidor was more popular than Anquetil even when Anquetil won, but this time Poulidor received "contemptuous whistles" at the finish in the Parc des Princes, while Anquetil received a standing ovation.

After Anquetil and Géminiani had shown that the rule that bicycle changes were not allowed was easily circumvented by faking a mechanical problem, this rule was removed for the next year.

== Bibliography ==
- Augendre, Jacques (2016). Guide historique [Historical guide] (PDF) (in French). Paris: Amaury Sport Organisation. Archived (PDF) from the original on 17 August 2016.
- McGann, Bill; McGann, Carol (2006). The Story of the Tour de France: 1903–1964. Vol. 1. Indianapolis: Dog Ear Publishing. ISBN 978-1-59858-180-5.
- Nauright, John; Parrish, Charles (2012). Sports Around the World: History, Culture, and Practice. Vol. 2. Santa Barbara, California: ABC-CLIO. ISBN 978-1-59884-300-2.
- van den Akker, Pieter (2018). Tour de France Rules and Statistics: 1903–2018. Self-published. ISBN 978-1-79398-080-9.
