= Ernesto Minetto =

Italian cyclist

Personal information
- Born: 28 February 1935
- Died: 8 March 1991 (aged 56)

Cycling career
- Sport: Cycling
- Role: Rider

Ernesto Minetto (28 February 1935 – 8 March 1991) was an Italian racing cyclist. He rode in the 1963 Tour de France.
