= José María López Caño =

Spanish cyclist

Personal information
- Born: 29 March 1939 (age 87)

Cycling career
- Sport: Cycling
- Role: Rider

José María López Caño (born 29 March 1939) is a Spanish racing cyclist. He rode in the 1963 Tour de France.
