= Simon Le Borgne =

French cyclist

Personal information
- Born: 21 December 1937 Quimper, France
- Died: 28 August 1997 (aged 59)

Cycling career
- Sport: Cycling
- Discipline: Road
- Role: Rider

Professional team
- 1960–1964: Mercier–BP–Hutchinson

Simon Le Borgne (21 December 1937 – 28 August 1997) was a French racing cyclist. He rode in the 1963 Tour de France.

== Major results ==
1961
1st Overall Tour de l'Aude

1st Stage 1

1st Maël-Pestivien
1st Stage 2 Tour du Nord
