= Jean Dupont (cyclist) =

French cyclist (1938–2025)

Personal information
- Born: 14 May 1938
- Died: 11 December 2025 (aged 87)

Cycling career
- Sport: Cycling
- Role: Rider

Jean Dupont (14 May 1938 – 11 December 2025) was a French racing cyclist. He rode in the 1963 Tour de France.

Dupont died on 11 December 2025, at the age of 87.
