= Angel Ottaviani =

Italian cyclist

Personal information
- Born: 16 January 1940 (age 86)

Cycling career
- Sport: Cycling
- Role: Rider

Angel Ottaviani (born 16 January 1940) is an Italian racing cyclist. He rode in the 1963 Tour de France.
