= Raúl Rey =

Spanish cyclist

Personal information
- Born: 4 September 1936 (age 90)

Cycling career
- Sport: Cycling
- Role: Rider

Raúl Rey (born 4 September 1936) is a Spanish former racing cyclist. He rode in the 1963 Tour de France.
