= Guy Epaud =

French cyclist

Personal information
- Born: 21 September 1936 (age 90)

Cycling career
- Sport: Cycling
- Role: Rider

Guy Epaud (born 21 September 1936) is a French racing cyclist. He rode in the 1963 Tour de France.
