= Roland Lacombe =

French cyclist

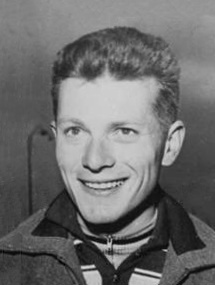
- Roland Lacombe in 1960

Personal information
- Born: 11 July 1938 Eure, France
- Died: 24 November 2011 (aged 73)
- Height: 1.79 m (5 ft 10 in)
- Weight: 77 kg (170 lb)

Cycling career
- Sport: Cycling

Roland Lacombe (11 July 1938 – 24 November 2011) was a French cyclist. He competed in the individual road race and 100 km team time trial at the 1960 Summer Olympics and finished in 13th and 7th place, respectively.

Lacombe won the Week-end Spadois in 1960 and the Roubaix-Cassel-Roubaix race in 1962.
