= Antonio Bailetti =

Italian road bicycle racer (1937–2025)

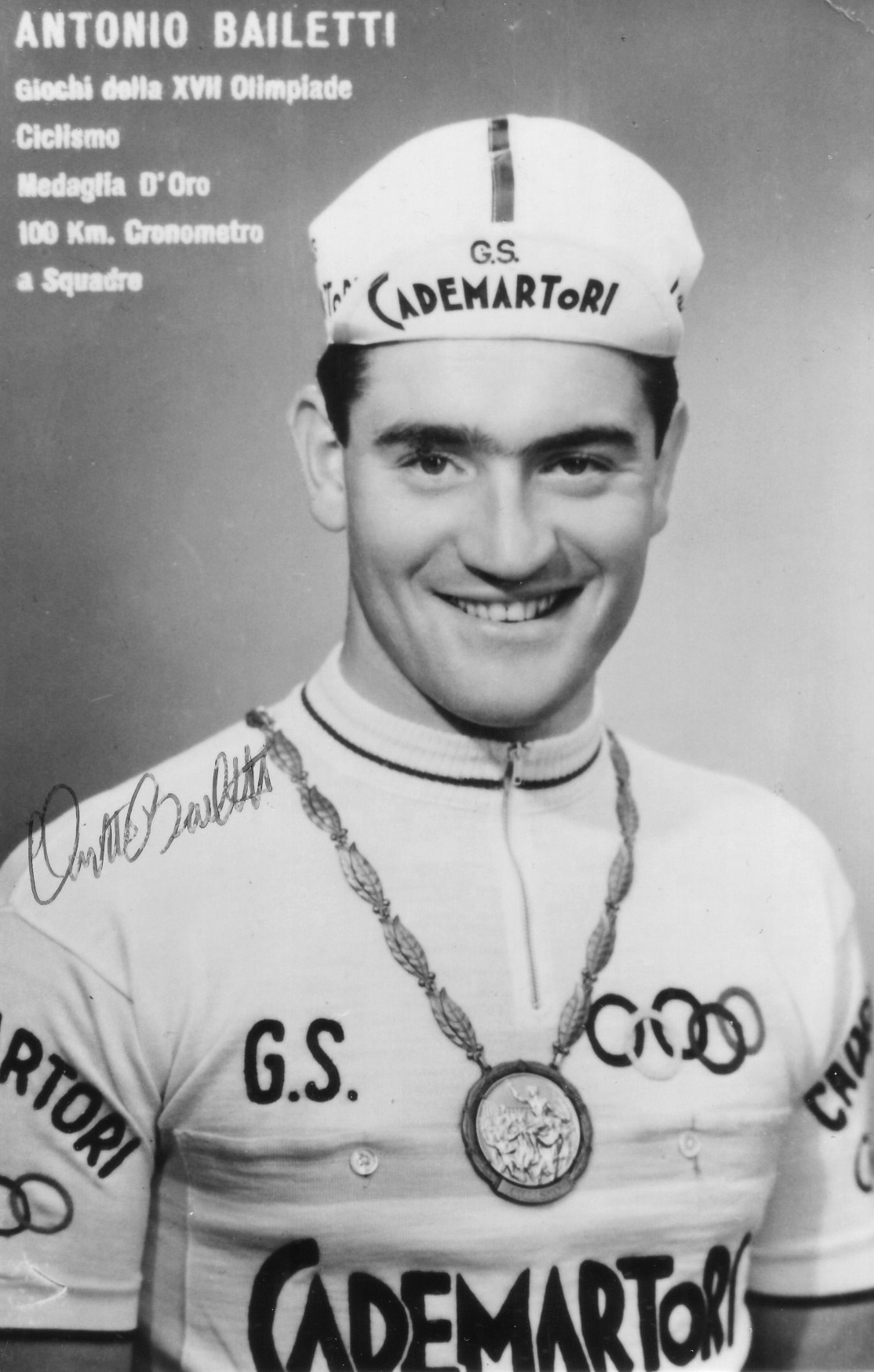

Personal information
- Born: 29 September 1937 Bosco di Nanto, Italy
- Died: 7 September 2025 (aged 87) Turbigo, Italy
- Height: 1.79 m (5 ft 10 in)
- Weight: 70 kg (154 lb)

Cycling career
- Sport: Cycling
- Discipline: Road
- Role: Rider

Major wins
- Olympic team time trial champion (1960); 2 stages Tour de France; 2 stages Giro d'Italia
Medal record
Men's road bicycle racing
Representing Italy
Olympic Games
Gold medal – first place	1960 Rome	Team time trial

Antonio Bailetti (29 September 1937 – 7 September 2025) was an Italian professional road bicycle racer who won a gold medal in the team time trial race at the 1960 Olympics. After that Bailetti turned professional. In 1962, he won a stage in the Tour de France and in the Giro d'Italia, after a 120 km solo escape; he repeated this achievement next year. He retired after a heavy fall in Spring 1969. Bailetti died on 7 September 2025, at the age of 87.

== Major results ==
1960
(gold) Olympic Games Team Time Trial (with Ottavio Cogliati, Giacomo Fornoni and Livio Trapé)
1961
Turbigo
Nyon
1962
Genoa–Nice
Maurs
Tour de France:

Winner stage 9

Giro d'Italia:

Winner stage 4

La Charité-sur-Loire
1963
Tour de France:

Winner stage 5

Giro d'Italia:

Winner stage 21

1965
Monaco
1966
Trofeo Laigueglia
