= Jambes =

Sub-municipality of the city of Namur, Belgium

Jambes Djambe (Walloon)
- Sub-municipality of Namur
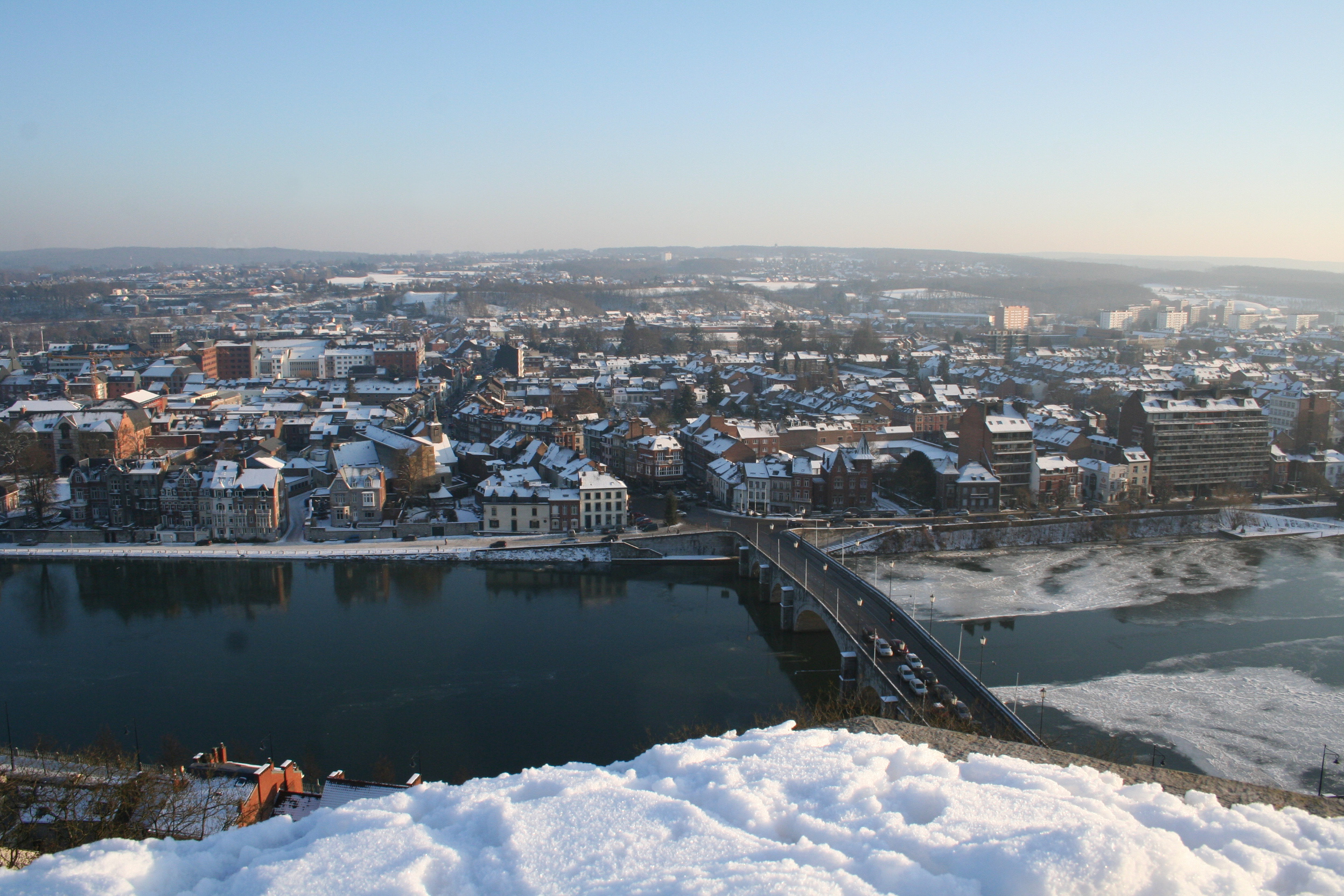
- Jambes and the Meuse
- Interactive map of Jambes
- Location within Belgium Location within Namur Province
- Coordinates: 50°27′00″N 4°52′00″E
- Country: Belgium
- Community: French Community
- Region: Wallonia
- Province: Namur
- Arrondissement: Namur
- Municipality: Namur

Area
  - Total: 7.61 km^{2} (2.94 sq mi)

Population (2021-06-22)
  - Total: 20,125
  - Density: 2,640/km^{2} (6,850/sq mi)
- Postal codes: 5100
- Area codes: 081

Jambes (French pronunciation: [ʒɑ̃b]; Walloon: Djambe) is a sub-municipality of the city of Namur located in the province of Namur, Wallonia, Belgium. It was a separate municipality until 1977. On 1 January 1977, it was merged into Namur.

Jambes is known for the former Géronsart Abbey, the 13th century Enhaive or Anhaive keep (donjon d'Enhaive or Anhaive), the old bridge on the river Meuse and the seat of the Government of Wallonia (Élysette).

== Transport ==
=== Railway ===
Jambes has two train stations: Jambes on the line 154 (Namur-Dinant) and Jambes-East on the line 161 (Namur-Luxembourg).
