= Loris Guernieri =

Italian cyclist

Personal information
- Born: 28 September 1937
- Died: 1 March 2003 (aged 65)

Cycling career
- Sport: Cycling
- Role: Rider

Loris Guernieri (28 September 1937 – 1 March 2003) was an Italian racing cyclist. He rode in the 1963 Tour de France.
