= Alan Ramsbottom =

British cyclist

Personal information
- Born: 30 April 1936 Clayton-le-Moors, England
- Died: 5 April 2023 (aged 86)

Cycling career
- Sport: Cycling
- Discipline: Road
- Role: Rider

Professional teams
- 1961: Helyett–Fynsec–Hutchinson
- 1962–1964: Pelforth–Sauvage–Lejeune
- 1965–1966: Peugeot–BP–Michelin
- 1967: Trumanns Steel–Jacques Anquetil Cycles

Alan Ramsbottom (30 April 1936 – 5 April 2023) was a professional racing cyclist from Clayton-le-Moors, England, who twice rode the Tour de France.

== Amateur career ==
Ramsbottom was a talented amateur in Britain in the late 1950s. He decided to race abroad when he wasn't selected for the Olympic Games of 1960 and moved to Troyes, France in 1961, after seeing an advertisement by the local club, UV Aube, for British riders. The club was run by Marcel Bidot, the French national team manager. Ramsbottom was inspired by meeting Britain's leading professional rider, Brian Robinson, at a cycling club dinner in Blackburn.

== Turning professional ==
He won the second stage of the Tour de l'Avenir in France in 1961, then turned professional and rode for the Pelforth-Sauvage team for 1962 and 1963. The team was advertised as riding Lejeune bicycles but Ramsbottom's was the Harry Quinn he had ridden as an amateur, sprayed in Lejeune colours.

He came 45th in the Tour de France in 1962 as a first-year professional. and 16th in 1963. He finished eighth in Liège–Bastogne–Liège in 1963. and 11th in the Flèche Wallonne in both 1963 and 1965. Bidot told Ramsbottom to think more of himself, to attack more and to force Pelforth to raise his salary. He won the Tour de Haute-Loire in France in 1964. He came fourth in Nice-Genoa, third in the Boucles Rouquevairoises. Ramsbottom planned to ride the Tour de France again that year but Pelforth dropped him from its team because of what Ramsbottom said was a misunderstanding between him and the manager, Maurice de Muer:

I was building up to be in top form for the Tour de France. The year before, I had been 16th and am confident that I would have been in the first 10 if I hadn't been ordered to wait for Henry Anglade, particularly on the Forclaz, when he was really beyond help. During the Dauphiné Libéré, which finished on 6 June just 16 days before the Tour started, Maurice de Muer said he wanted me to ride in the Tour of Luxembourg from 12–15 June. I reminded him of my heavy early season, and my anxiety to do well in the Tour de France. I said I had a chance to ride the Isle of Man pro race on the 17th. Did he mind if I missed the Luxembourg tour? He agreed, and said it would be all right.

Later in the Dauphiné, my wife rang to say there was a letter from our team manager saying I had been picked for the Tour of Luxembourg. Assuming this letter to have been written before my talk with de Muer and that it had no more significance, I told her not to bother to reply and went off to the Isle of Man and finished fourth and returned to the Continent to find big stories in the papers saying I had failed to turn up at Luxembourg and cost Anglade the race. They wouldn't listen to my argument and I was chucked out of the Tour team.

== Move to Belgium ==
In 1964 he moved from Troyes to Belgium to join Tom Simpson in the Peugeot team But after that, he said, nothing went right.". He fell while training with another British professional, Vin Denson, caught his hand between cobbles and broke an arm. He said:

If I had my chance on the Continent over again, I wouldn't change a thing until May 1964, when I moved to Belgium. Things never went right after that. Troyes - and most districts of France - give any rider a chance to shine if he has the ability. Belgium - Flanders, that is, where the majority of races are held - basically suits only one type of rider: the strong, fearless man who is prepared to rake risks and barge his way through gaps, but I am not one of them.

Living in Ghent gave him the chance to ride more criteriums, the round-the-houses races where professionals in the 1960s made much of their money. He came third at Meerbeke in 1964 and third in London, at Crystal Palace, where he, runner-up Seamus Elliott and winner Tom Simpson lapped a field of mainly domestic professionals.

He didn't get in Peugeot's team for the Tour de France in 1965. He came second in a criterium at Wortegem, Belgium and at Zele and third at Aartrijke in 1965.

== Return to Britain ==
In 1966 he returned to Britain because a glut of unemployed professionals on the Continent pushed wages lower than he thought necessary for a married man with two children. He moved to Great Harwood, Lancashire and went back to his former trade as a sewing machine mechanic, working in textile factories. At weekends he rode for domestic professional teams, in 1966 and 1967 for Viking Cycles. In 1965, Ramsbottom rode the Grand Prix des Gentilhommes at Lille with the journalist Jock Wadley. The race paired current riders with former racers or leisure riders in a two-man time-trial. Wadley called him:

...a man of few words who often seems lost in thought. He seems totally unaffected by the Tour and all that it entails, and doesn't seem to care much what happens, simply shrugging his shoulders when asked what his plans were. Whereas at the end of a tough day in the saddle his former team-mate Henry Anglade grabs a microphone and talks, Alan swallows a bottle of Perrier and pedals off to the hotel.

Ramsbottom said the pain of his disappointment on the Continent "lessened over the years".

Ramsbottom died on 5 April 2023, aged 86.

== Major results ==
1961
1st Stage 2 Tour de l'Avenir
5th Overall Grand Prix de Fourmies
1962
3rd Overall Tour de l'Aude

1st Stage 3

3rd Manx Premier Trophy
4th Overall Grand Prix de Fourmies
1963
5th Tour de l'Hérault
6th Manx Premier Trophy
8th Liège–Bastogne–Liège
1964
4th Genoa–Nice
4th Manx Premier Trophy
5th Overall Paris–Nice

=== Grand Tour general classification results timeline ===
Grand Tour	1962	1963
Vuelta a España	—	—
Giro d'Italia	—	—
Tour de France	45	16

Legend
—	Did not compete
DNF	Did not finish
