= Giacomo Fornoni =

Italian cyclist (1939–2016)

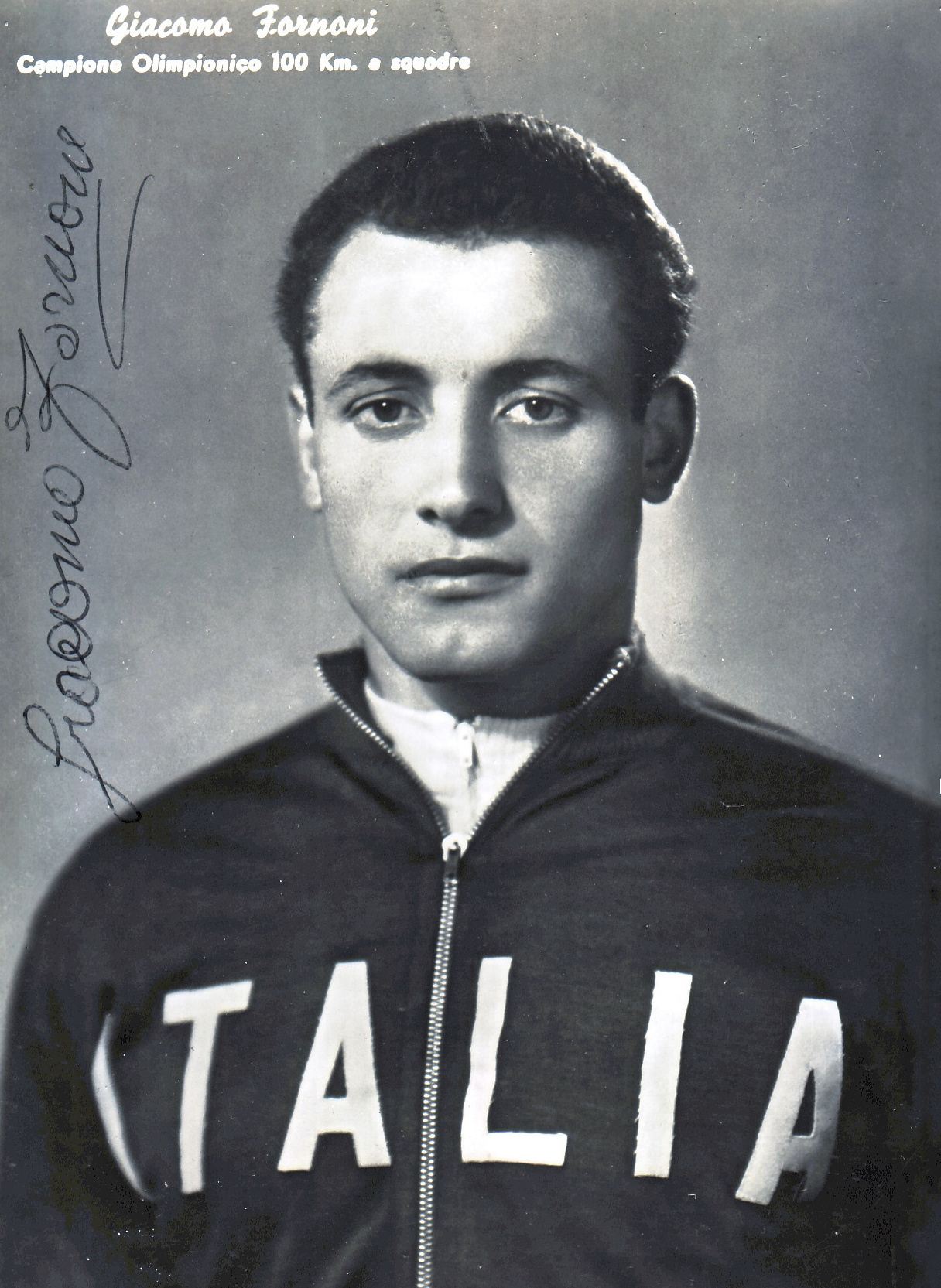

Personal information
- Born: 26 December 1939 Gromo, Italy
- Died: 26 September 2016 (aged 76)
- Height: 1.72 m (5 ft 8 in)
- Weight: 68 kg (150 lb)

Cycling career
- Sport: Cycling
Medal record
Representing ITA
Olympic Games
Gold medal – first place	1960 Rome	Team time trial

Giacomo Fornoni (26 December 1939 – 26 September 2016) was an Italian cyclist. He won the gold medal in the team time trial at the 1960 Summer Olympics After the Olympics Fornoni turned professional and competed until 1969. He rode the Tour de France in 1963, 1965 and 1966.
