= Tour de l'Aude (men's race) =

Bicycle race

Race details
- Date: April
- Region: Aude, France
- English name: Tour of the Aude
- Discipline: Road
- Type: Stage race

History
- First edition: 1957
- Editions: 20
- Final edition: 1986
- First winner: André Dupré (FRA)
- Final winner: Jean-Luc Vandenbroucke (BEL)

The Tour de l'Aude (English: Tour of the Aude), was a multi-day road bicycle race held annually from 1957 to 1986 in the department of Aude, France. It was merged with the Grand Prix du Midi Libre in 1987.

== Winners ==
Year	Winner	Second	Third
1957	(France) André Dupré	(Italy) Siro Bianchi	(France) Alfred Tonello
1958	(France) Emmanuel Busto	(France) Arnaud Geyre	(Italy) Siro Bianchi
1959	(France) Jean Plaudet	(France) Marcel Queheille	(France) Roger Napolitano
1960	(France) Gérard Thiélin	(France) René Abadie	(France) Roger Walkowiak
1961	(France) Simon Leborgne	(France) Henri Anglade	(France) Joseph Carrara
1962	(West Germany) Rolf Wolfshohl	(Netherlands) Albertus Geldermans	(United Kingdom) Alan Ramsbottom
1973	(France) Jean-Pierre Parenteau	(France) Claude Aigueparses	(France) Bernard Thévenet
1974	(Netherlands) Cees Bal	(United Kingdom) Barry Hoban	(France) Jean-Jacques Fussien
1975	(Belgium) Lucien Van Impe	(France) Michel Perin	(Portugal) Joaquim Agostinho
1976	(France) Bernard Hinault	(France) Hubert Mathis	(France) Patrick Béon
1977	(France) Jean-Pierre Danguillaume	(Belgium) Ludo Peeters	(Netherlands) Roy Schuiten
1978	(Italy) Francesco Moser	(France) René Bittinger	(Belgium) Eddy Schepers
1979	(Italy) Francesco Moser	(France) Pierre-Raymond Villemiane	(France) Michel Laurent
1980	(France) Marcel Tinazzi	(France) Patrick Perret	(Belgium) Ferdi Van Den Haute
1981	(Australia) Phil Anderson	(Italy) Palmiro Masciarelli	(France) Bernard Becaas
1982	(France) Bernard Vallet	(France) Patrick Bonnet	(France) Bernard Hinault
1983	(Australia) Phil Anderson	(Denmark) Kim Andersen	(France) Dominique Garde
1984	(France) Pierre-Henri Menthéour	(Netherlands) Joop Zoetemelk	(France) Pascal Poisson
1985	(Italy) Silvano Contini	(Spain) Iñaki Gastón	(Spain) Eduardo Chozas
1986	(Belgium) Jean-Luc Vandenbroucke	(Poland) Czesław Lang	(France) Thierry Marie
