= Renzo Fontona =

Italian cyclist

Personal information
- Full name: Renzo Fontona
- Born: 2 July 1939 (age 87) Riccò del Golfo di Spezia, Italy

Cycling career
- Sport: Cycling
- Discipline: Road
- Role: Rider

Professional teams
- 1961–1962: Legnano
- 1963: IBAC
- 1964–1965: Ignis
- 1966–1967: Mainetti
- 1968: Kelvinator

Renzo Fontona (born 2 July 1939) is an Italian racing cyclist. He ended up 7th at the 1963 Tour de France.
