= Dick Enthoven (cyclist) =

Dutch cyclist (1936–2021)

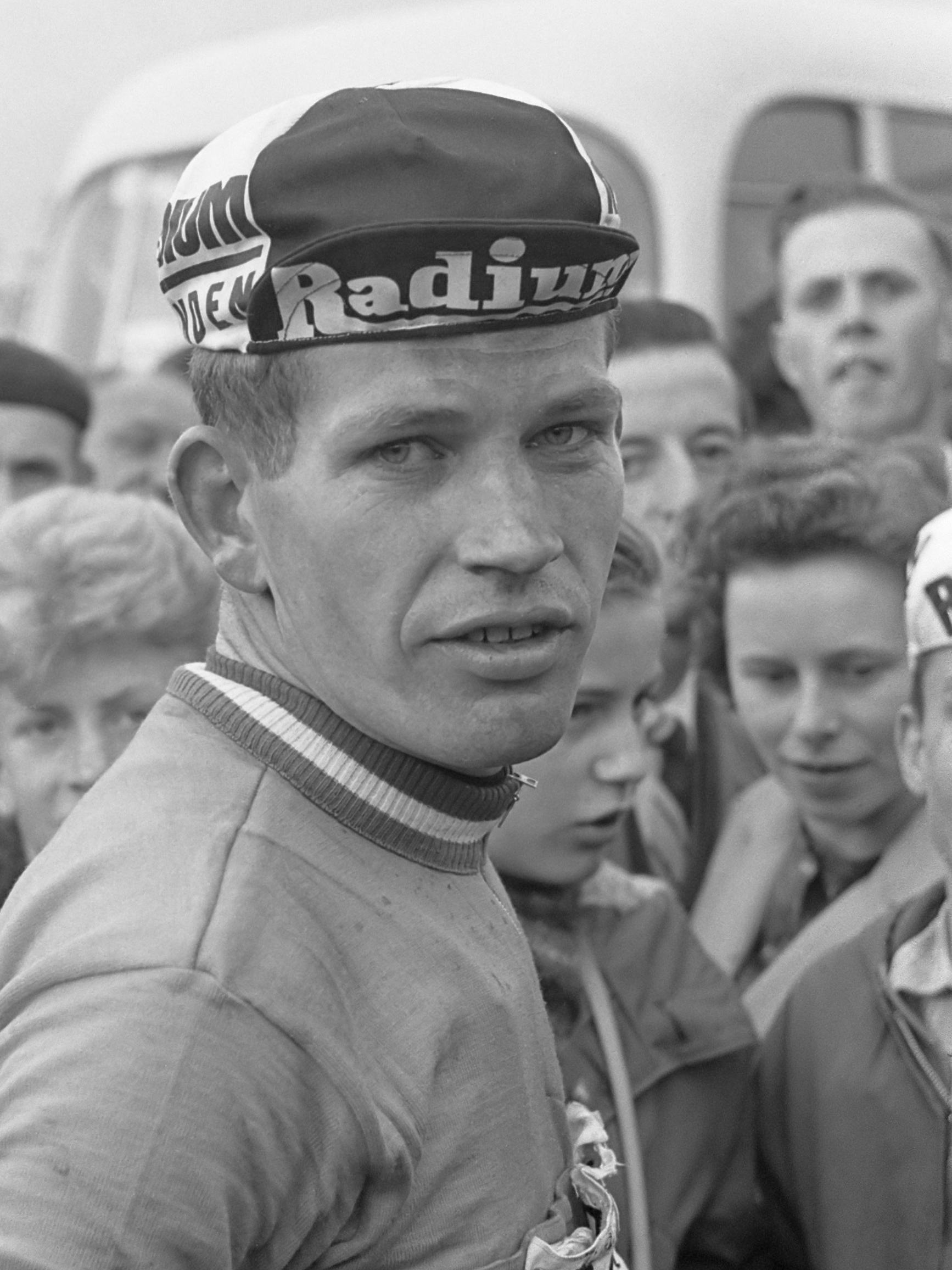

Personal information
- Born: 2 August 1936 Halfweg, Netherlands
- Died: 21 March 2021 (aged 84)

Cycling career
- Sport: Cycling
- Discipline: Road
- Role: Rider

Professional teams
- 1959–1961: Rapha–Gitane–Dunlop
- 1960–1961: Radium
- 1962–1964: Pelforth–Sauvage–Lejeune
- 1965: Wiel's–Groene Leeuw
- 1965: Amstel Bier

Dick Enthoven (2 August 1936 – 21 March 2021) was a Dutch racing cyclist. He rode in three editions of the Tour de France and won the Tour of the Netherlands in 1961.

== Major results ==
1959
3rd Overall Tour de Pologne

1st Stage 5

3rd Omloop der Kempen
1960
2nd Overall Tour du Nord
6th Circuit des XI Villes
1961
1st Overall Tour of the Netherlands
1962
4th Overall Tour de l'Aude
6th Overall Tour du Nord
7th Overall Critérium du Dauphiné Libéré
1964
6th Liège–Bastogne–Liège
