= IBAC (cycling team) =

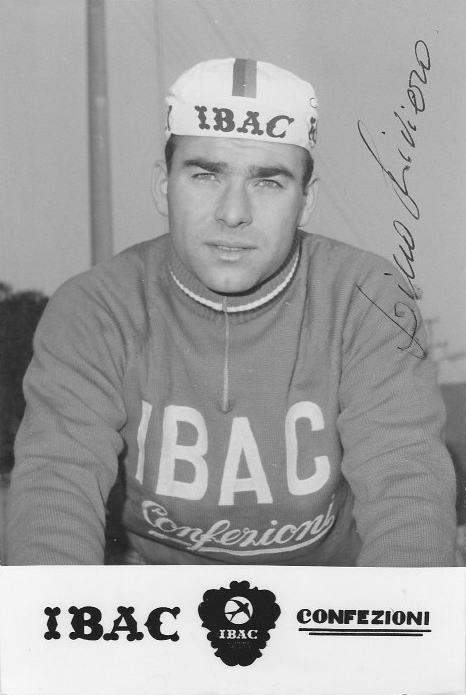
- Dino Liviero c. 1964

Team information
- Registered: Italy
- Founded: 1963
- Disbanded: 1964
- Discipline: Road

Team name history
- 1963–1964: IBAC

IBAC was a professional cycling team that existed in 1963 and 1964. It participated in the 1963 Tour de France, forming a combined team with Molteni.
