= Willy Derboven =

Belgian cyclist

- Derboven with Solo–Superia around 1965

Personal information
- Full name: Willy Derboven
- Born: 19 September 1939 Leuven, Belgium
- Died: 22 November 1996 (aged 57) Tenerife, Spain

Cycling career
- Sport: Cycling
- Discipline: Road
- Role: Rider

Major wins
- 1 stage Tour de France

Willy Derboven (Leuven, 19 September 1939 — Tenerife, Spain, 22 November 1996) was a Belgian professional road bicycle racer. In 1963, Derboven was the lanterne rouge of the 1963 Tour de France. In 1964, he beat German Rudi Altig in the fifth stage of the 1964 Tour de France.

== Major results ==
1960
Berlare
Romsée-Stavelot-Romsée
Hoegaarden
1962
Onze-Lieve-Vrouw-Tielt
1964
Tour de France:

Winner stage 5

1966
Geetbets
Liedekerke
Scherpenheuvel
Tessenderlo
1967
Nieuwkerken-Waas
1968
Hoogstraten
