= Guy Ignolin =

French cyclist

Personal information
- Full name: Guy Ignolin
- Born: 14 November 1936 Vernou-sur-Brenne, France
- Died: 15 December 2011 (aged 75) Lannion, France

Cycling career
- Sport: Cycling
- Discipline: Road
- Role: Rider

Major wins
- Grand Tours Tour de France 3 individual stages (1961, 1963) Vuelta a España 2 individual stages (1963)

Guy Ignolin (14 November 1936 – 15 December 2011) was a French professional road bicycle racer. He was born in Vernou-sur-Brenne and died in Lannion, aged 75.

== Major results ==
1959
Montmorillon
1960
Circuit d'Auvergne
1961
Circuit d'Auvergne
Tour de France:

Winner stage 10

1962
Circuit d'Auvergne
Grand Prix de Fourmies
1963
Tour de France:

Winner stages 11 and 14

Vuelta a España:

Winner stages 6 and 15

Guénin
Bain-de-Bretagne
1964
Combourg
Plévin
Plumelec
1965
Châteaulin
Circuit de l'Aulne
Circuit du Morbihan
Lescouet-Jugon
Perros-Guirec
1966
Pont-de-Bois
1967
Begard
Plancoët
Pleyber-Christ
Quemper-Guézennec
Iffendic
1968
Ruban Granitier Breton
1969
Plonevez-du-Faou
