= Marcel Ongenae =

Belgian cyclist

Personal information
- Born: 3 July 1934
- Died: 8 October 2014 (aged 80)

Cycling career
- Sport: Cycling
- Role: Rider

Marcel Ongenae (3 July 1934 – 8 October 2014) was a Belgian racing cyclist. He rode in the 1962 Tour de France.
