= Roger De Breuker =

Belgian cyclist

Personal information
- Full name: Roger De Breuker
- Born: 13 July 1940 (age 86) Grobbendonk, Belgium

Cycling career
- Sport: Cycling
- Discipline: Road
- Role: Rider

Major wins
- 2 stages 1963 Tour de France

Roger De Breuker (Grobbendonk, 13 July 1940) was a Belgian professional road bicycle racer. De Breuker's only Tour de France that he participated in was the 1963 Tour de France, where he won 2 stages.

== Major results ==
1961
Tour of Belgium (for amateurs, Grand Prix of Hempstead
1962
Edegem, one Stage in Peace-Race, 4. in Final Classement
1963
Tour de France:

Winner stages 6A and 20
