= Louis Proost =

Belgian cyclist

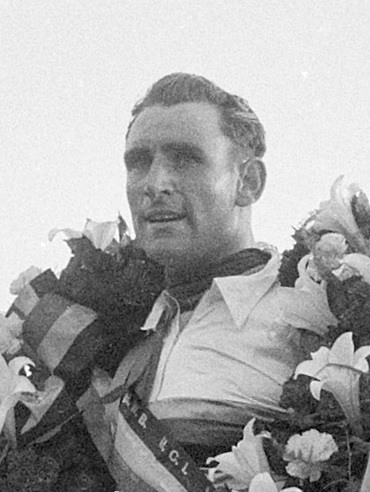
- Louis Proost in 1957

Personal information
- Full name: Louis Proost
- Born: 7 April 1935 Halle, Belgium
- Died: 2 February 2009 (aged 73)

Cycling career
- Sport: Cycling
- Discipline: Road
- Role: Rider

Major wins
- World amateur road race champion 1 stage 1960 Tour de France
Medal record
Representing Belgium
Men's road bicycle racing
World Championships
Gold medal – first place	1957 Waregem	Amateur's Road Race

Louis Proost (7 April 1935 in Halle – 2 February 2009) was a Belgian professional road bicycle racer, who became world amateur champion in 1957. In the 1960 Tour de France, he won one stage.

== Major results ==
1957
World Amateur road race Championship
1958
Brasschaat
Sint-Niklaas
Brussels–Ingooigem
Zwijndrecht
Rummen
1959
Boulogne-sur-Mer
Oostende
Glabbeek
Turnhout
Rijkevorsel
1960
Ekeren
Bruxelles – Charleroi – Bruxelles
Wuustwezel
Tour de France:

Winner stage 13

1961
Borgerhout
Waasmunster
Edegem
Melle
Giro d'Itala:

Winner stage 5

1962
Beringen
Hoeilaart-Diest-Hoeilaart
Nieuwkerken-Waas
Polder-Kempen
Oedelem
Turnhout
Zandhoven
Sint-Amands
1963
Beveren-Waas
Hoeilaart-Diest-Hoeilaart
Omloop van West-Brabant
Schoten – Willebroek
Sint-Truiden
Rijmenam
Mouscron
Edegem
Zandhoven
Wetteren
1964
Tervuren
Bierbeek
Melle
Mortsel
Tessenderlo
Lommel
Kontich
1965
Polderpijl
Zwijndrecht
Kontich
1966
Beveren-Waas
Omloop van Midden-Vlaanderen
Diksmuide
