= Jean Simon (cyclist) =

Belgian cyclist

Personal information
- Born: 21 August 1936 (age 90)

Cycling career
- Sport: Cycling
- Role: Rider

Jean Simon (born 21 August 1936) is a Belgian racing cyclist. He rode in the 1963 Tour de France.
