= Claude Mattio =

French cyclist

Personal information
- Born: 1 February 1936 (age 90)

Cycling career
- Sport: Cycling
- Role: Rider

Claude Mattio (born 1 February 1936) is a French racing cyclist. He rode in the 1961 Tour de France.
