= Guillaume Van Tongerloo =

Belgian cyclist

Personal information
- Born: 29 December 1933 Antwerp, Belgium
- Died: 19 January 2017 (aged 83)

Cycling career
- Sport: Cycling

Guillaume Van Tongerloo (29 December 1933 – 19 January 2017) was a Belgian cyclist. He competed in the team pursuit event at the 1956 Summer Olympics.
