= 1964 GP Ouest-France =

Race details
- Dates: 1 September 1964
- Stages: 1
- Distance: 180 km (111.8 mi)
- Winning time: 5h 16' 00"

Results
	Winner	Jean Bourlès (FRA)
	Second	Hubert Ferrer (FRA)
	Third	Jean Gainche (FRA)

The 1964 GP Ouest-France was the 28th edition of the GP Ouest-France cycle race and was held on 1 September 1964. The race started and finished in Plouay. The race was won by Jean Bourlès.

== General classification ==
Final general classification

Rank	Rider	Time
1	Jean Bourlès (FRA)	5h 16' 00"
2	Hubert Ferrer (FRA)	+ 0"
3	Jean Gainche (FRA)	+ 1' 35"
4	Jean-Claude Lebaube (FRA)	+ 1' 35"
5	François Hamon (FRA)	+ 1' 35"
6	André Le Dissez (FRA)	+ 1' 35"
7	Félix Lebuhotel (FRA)	+ 1' 35"
8	Raymond Batan (FRA)	+ 1' 35"
9	Pierre Le Mellec (FRA)	+ 1' 35"
10	Joseph Thomin (FRA)	+ 1' 35"
