= 1969 GP Ouest-France =

Race details
- Dates: 26 August 1969
- Stages: 1
- Distance: 196 km (121.8 mi)
- Winning time: 5h 08' 00"

Results
	Winner	Jean Jourden (FRA)
	Second	François Goasduff (FRA)
	Third	Léon-Paul Ménard (FRA)

The 1969 GP Ouest-France was the 33rd edition of the GP Ouest-France cycle race and was held on 26 August 1969. The race started and finished in Plouay. The race was won by Jean Jourden.

== General classification ==
Final general classification

Rank	Rider	Time
1	Jean Jourden (FRA)	5h 08' 00"
2	François Goasduff (FRA)	+ 15"
3	Léon-Paul Ménard (FRA)	+ 15"
4	Claude Mazeaud (FRA)	+ 15"
5	Georges Groussard (FRA)	+ 30"
6	François Hamon (FRA)	+ 30"
7	Jean Pinault (FRA)	+ 30"
8	André Zimmermann (FRA)	+ 45"
9	Georges Chappe (FRA)	+ 45"
10	Alain Vasseur (FRA)	+ 55"
