= 1960 GP Ouest-France =

Race details
- Dates: 30 August 1960
- Stages: 1
- Distance: 195 km (121.2 mi)
- Winning time: 5h 10' 00"

Results
	Winner	Hubert Ferrer (FRA)
	Second	André Foucher (FRA)
	Third	Joseph Velly (FRA)

The 1960 GP Ouest-France was the 24th edition of the GP Ouest-France cycle race and was held on 30 August 1960. The race started and finished in Plouay. The race was won by Hubert Ferrer.

== General classification ==
Final general classification

Rank	Rider	Time
1	Hubert Ferrer (FRA)	5h 10' 00"
2	André Foucher (FRA)	+ 10"
3	Joseph Velly (FRA)	+ 2' 10"
4	Félix Lebuhotel (FRA)	+ 2' 10"
5	Jean Gainche (FRA)	+ 2' 10"
6	Emile Le Bigaut (FRA)	+ 2' 10"
7	Marcel Carfantan (FRA)	+ 2' 10"
8	Joseph Thomin (FRA)	+ 2' 10"
9	Amand Audaire (FRA)	+ 2' 10"
10	Emmanuel Crenn (FRA)	+ 2' 10"
