= Bretagne Classic =

French one-day road cycling race

Race details
- Date: Late August
- Region: Brittany, France
- English name: Brittany Classic
- Local name: Bretagne Classic (in French)
- Discipline: Road
- Competition: UCI World Tour
- Type: One-day race
- Organiser: Comité des Fêtes de Plouay
- Web site: pco.bzh/4-jours-cic-plouay/grand-prix-bretagne-classic.php

History
- First edition: 1931; 95 years ago
- Editions: 90 (as of 2026)
- First winner: François Favé (FRA)
- Most wins: 10 riders with 2 wins
- Most recent: Alex Aranburu (ESP)

The Bretagne Classic, also called Bretagne Classic CIC, is an elite cycling classic held annually in late summer around the Breton village of Plouay in western France.

The race was originally named Grand-Prix de Plouay and, from 1989 to 2015, GP Ouest-France. It was included in the inaugural UCI ProTour in 2005 and in 2011 in its successor, the UCI World Tour. Since 2016 it is called Bretagne Classic Ouest-France.

Since 2002, a women's event, the Classic Lorient Agglomération is organized on Saturday, the day before the men's race. Supporting events have grown over the years and now include BMX races, track racing and a mass-participation ride, as part of a four–day festival in the last summer weekend in Brittany.

== History ==
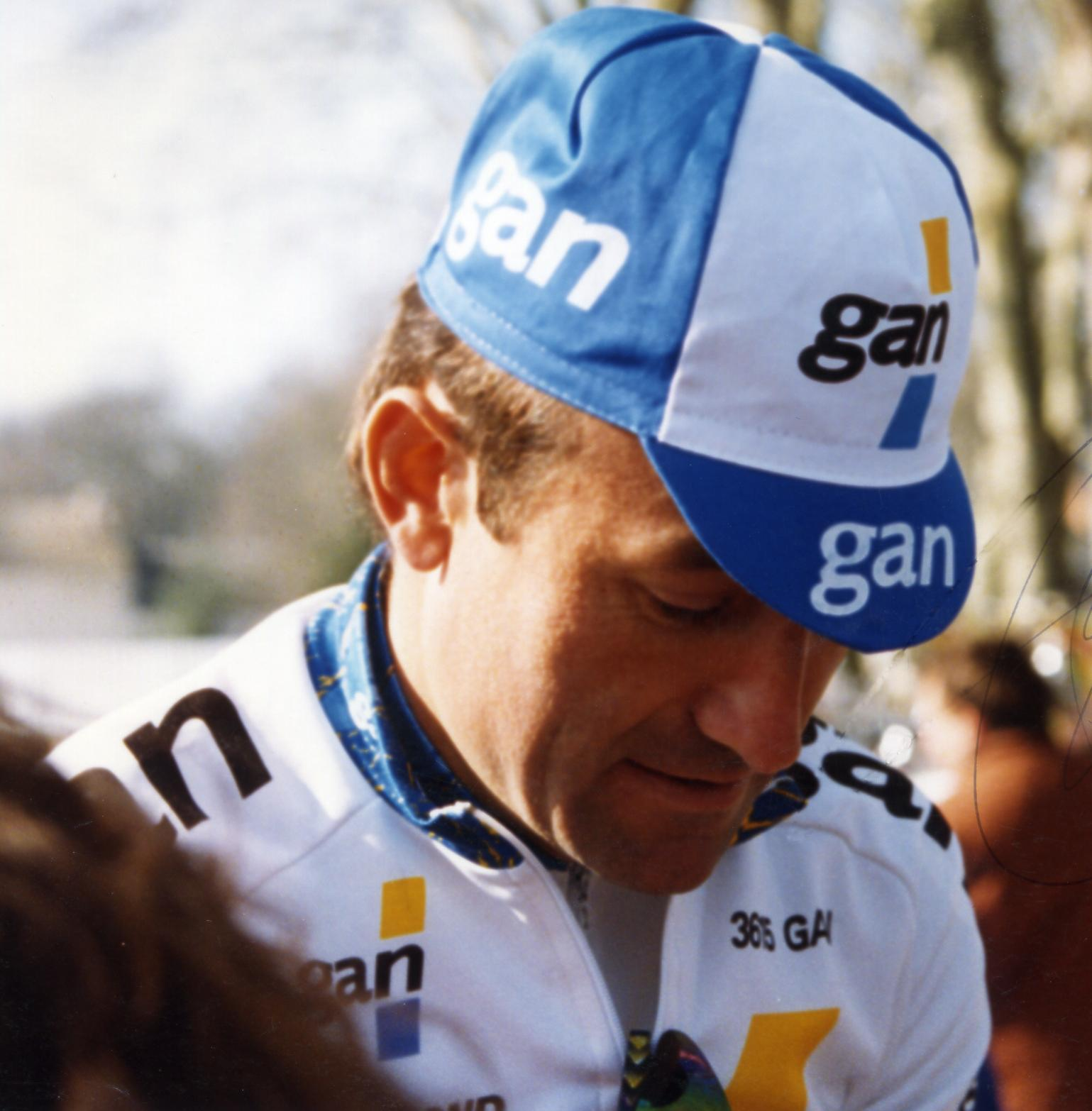
Gilbert Duclos-Lassalle (pictured at the 1993 Paris–Nice) is the last French rider to have won the race twice

The Bretagne Classic, originally named Circuit de Plouay and later the Grand-Prix de Plouay, was created in 1931 by former Tour de France doctor Berty, who used his influence to attract some of the biggest names of French cycling to the inaugural edition. Breton rider François Favé won the inaugural edition. In its first decades the race was dominated by French riders. The first non-French winner was Italian Ugo Anzile in 1954, the second was Holland's Frits Pirard in 1979. Ten riders have won the race two times, all of them French except Oliver Naesen, the most recent to do so with wins in 2016 and 2018.

Throughout its history, the roll of honour includes some illustrious winners. Séan Kelly was the first English-speaking rider to win in 1984. Belgian Frank Vandenbroucke became the youngest winner in 1996, at the age of 21. Italian Vincenzo Nibali, on his way to cycling legend, took a surprise victory in 2006, at the age of 22. Australians Simon Gerrans and Matthew Goss won in 2009 and 2010 respectively, with Norway's Edvald Boasson Hagen soloing to victory in 2012 and Italy's Filippo Pozzato helping resurrect his career with a surprise win in 2013.

In 2014 the attackers managed to hold off the chasing peloton, with Frenchman Sylvain Chavanel winning the seven-man sprint. Alexander Kristoff was only two seconds behind, winning the sprint for eighth place. In 2015 it was Kristoff's turn for victory, leading out a bunch sprint of 69 riders.

== Route ==
The race starts and finishes in the small village of Plouay, in the heartland of French cycling. The course consists of eight laps of a demanding 27 km (17 mi) circuit and one 14 km (8.7 mi) lap in the backdrop of Brittany. The circuit is known for its high rate of attrition, featuring climbs and technical descents. The total distance covered is 247 km (153.5 mi).

The first climb is addressed almost immediately after the start as the race goes over the Côte du Lézot, a one-kilometre (0.62 mi) climb with an average gradient of 6%. Next is a gentle six-kilometre (3.7 mi) ascent up to the Chapelle Sainte-Anne des Bois, marking the halfway point of the circuit. After a flat section, the race addresses the Côte de Ty-Marrec, with a maximum gradient of 10%.

The race ends with a final lap of 14 km (8.7 mi), with the last climb of the Côte de Ty-Marrec providing opportunities to launch attacks or distance sprinters. Sometimes a small group of riders manages to stay away, but often they are caught by the sprinters and their teams in sight of the finish line.

== Winners ==
Year	Country	Rider	Team
↓ "Circuit de Plouay" ↓
1931	France	François Favé	
1932	France	Philippe Bono	
1933	France	Philippe Bono	
1934	France	Lucien Tulot	
1935	France	Jean Le Dily	
1936	France	Pierre Cogan	
1937	France	Jean-Marie Goasmat	
1938	France	Pierre Cloarec	
1945	France	Eloi Tassin	
1946	France	Ange Le Strat	
1947	France	Raymond Louviot	
1948	France	Eloi Tassin	
1949	France	Amand Audaire	
1950	France	Amand Audaire	
1951	France	Émile Guérinel	
1952	France	Émile Guérinel	
1953	France	Serge Blusson	
1954	Italy	Ugo Anzile	
1955	France	Jean Petitjean	
1956	France	Valentin Huot	
1957	France	Isaac Vitré	
1958	France	Jean Gainche	
1959	France	Emmanuel Crenn	
↓ "Grand-Prix de Plouay" ↓
1960	France	Hubert Ferrer	
1961	France	Fernand Picot	
1962	France	Jean Gainche	
1963	France	Fernand Picot	
1964	France	Jean Bourlès	
1965	France	François Goasduff	
1966	France	Claude Mazeaud	
1967	France	François Hamon	
1968	France	Jean Jourden	
1969	France	Jean Jourden	
1970	France	Jean Marcarini	
1971	France	Jean-Pierre Danguillaume	
1972	France	Robert Bouloux	
1973	France	Jean-Claude Largeau	
1974	France	Raymond Martin	
1975	France	Cyrille Guimard	
1976	France	Jacques Bossis	
1977	France	Jacques Bossis	
1978	France	Pierre-Raymond Villemiane	
1979	Netherlands	Frits Pirard	
1980	France	Patrick Friou	
1981	France	Gilbert Duclos-Lassalle	
1982	France	François Castaing	
1983	France	Pierre Bazzo	
1984	Ireland	Sean Kelly	Skil–Reydel–Sem–Mavic
1985	France	Éric Guyot	Skil–Sem–Kas–Miko
1986	France	Martial Gayant	Système U
1987	France	Gilbert Duclos-Lassalle	Vétements Z–Peugeot
1988	France	Luc Leblanc	Toshiba–Look
↓ "GP Ouest-France" ↓
1989	France	Jean-Claude Colotti	R.M.O.
1990	France	Bruno Cornillet	Z–Tomasso
1991	France	Armand de Las Cuevas	Banesto
1992	France	Ronan Pensec	R.M.O.
1993	France	Thierry Claveyrolat	GAN
1994	Moldova	Andreï Tchmil	Lotto
1995	Switzerland	Rolf Järmann	MG Maglificio
1996	Belgium	Frank Vandenbroucke	Mapei–GB
1997	Italy	Andrea Ferrigato	Roslotto–ZG Mobili
1998	France	Pascal Hervé	Festina–Lotus
1999	France	Christophe Mengin	Française des Jeux
2000	Italy	Michele Bartoli	Mapei–Quick-Step
2001	Belgium	Nico Mattan	Cofidis
2002	Great Britain	Jeremy Hunt	BigMat–Auber 93
2003	France	Andy Flickinger	AG2R Prévoyance
2004	France	Didier Rous	Brioches La Boulangère
2005		no winner (Note: George Hincapie was declared winner. However, in 2012, he was stripped of all results by the UCI between May 31, 2004, and July 31, 2006 due to his use of performance-enhancing drugs.)	
2006	Italy	Vincenzo Nibali	Liquigas
2007	France	Thomas Voeckler	Bouygues Télécom
2008	France	Pierrick Fédrigo	Bouygues Télécom
2009	Australia	Simon Gerrans	Cervélo TestTeam
2010	Australia	Matthew Goss	Team HTC–Columbia
2011	Slovenia	Grega Bole	Lampre–ISD
2012	Norway	Edvald Boasson Hagen	Team Sky
2013	Italy	Filippo Pozzato	Lampre–Merida
2014	France	Sylvain Chavanel	IAM Cycling
2015	Norway	Alexander Kristoff	Team Katusha
↓ "Bretagne Classic" ↓
2016	Belgium	Oliver Naesen	IAM Cycling
2017	Italy	Elia Viviani	Team Sky
2018	Belgium	Oliver Naesen	AG2R La Mondiale
2019	Belgium	Sep Vanmarcke	EF Education First
2020	Australia	Michael Matthews	Team Sunweb
2021	France	Benoît Cosnefroy	AG2R Citroën Team
2022	Belgium	Wout van Aert	Team Jumbo–Visma
2023	France	Valentin Madouas	Groupama–FDJ
2024	Switzerland	Marc Hirschi	UAE Team Emirates
2025	Belgium	Arnaud De Lie	Lotto
2026	Spain	Alex Aranburu	Cofidis

=== Multiple winners ===
Wins	Rider	Editions
2	Philippe Bono (FRA)	1932 + 1933
2	Eloi Tassin (FRA)	1945 + 1948
2	Amand Audaire (FRA)	1949 + 1950
2	Émile Guérinel (FRA)	1951 + 1952
2	Jean Gainche (FRA)	1958 + 1962
2	Fernand Picot (FRA)	1961 + 1963
2	Jean Jourden (FRA)	1968 + 1969
2	Jacques Bossis (FRA)	1976 + 1977
2	Gilbert Duclos-Lassalle (FRA)	1981 + 1987
2	Oliver Naesen (BEL)	2016 + 2018

=== Wins per country ===
Wins	Country
63	France
7	Belgium
6	Italy
3	Australia
2	Norway; Switzerland
1	Ireland; Moldova; Netherlands; Slovenia; Spain; United Kingdom

== Classic Lorient Agglomération ==
Since 2002, a women's event, the Classic Lorient Agglomération has been organized, using the same circuit. Originally part of the UCI Women's Road World Cup, the race is now part of the UCI Women's World Tour. Britain's Lizzie Deignan and the Netherlands' Mischa Bredewold hold the record for most wins, with three each.

== Trivia ==
- No rider has won the race more than two times so far.
- The GP Ouest-France is one of only a few international sporting events organized entirely by volunteers: 600-700 members of the Comité des Fêtes de Plouay manage the proceedings of the organization.
- Plouay has organized the 2000 Road World Championships, using the circuit of the GP Ouest-France. Latvian Romāns Vainšteins won the elite men's road race, beating Zbigniew Spruch and Óscar Freire in a bunch sprint. Belarusian Zinaida Stahurskaia won the women's road race in a solo victory.
