= 1958 GP Ouest-France =

Race details
- Dates: 26 August 1958
- Stages: 1
- Distance: 180 km (111.8 mi)
- Winning time: 4h 54' 00"

Results
	Winner	Jean Gainche (FRA)
	Second	André Ruffet (FRA)
	Third	Fernand Picot (FRA)

The 1958 GP Ouest-France was the 22nd edition of the GP Ouest-France cycle race and was held on 26 August 1958. The race started and finished in Plouay. The race was won by Jean Gainche.

== General classification ==
Final general classification

Rank	Rider	Time
1	Jean Gainche (FRA)	4h 54' 00"
2	André Ruffet (FRA)	+ 0"
3	Fernand Picot (FRA)	+ 0"
3	Joseph Thomin (FRA)	+ 0"
5	Jean Bourlès (FRA)	+ 0"
6	Amand Audaire (FRA)	+ 0"
7	André Gislard (FRA)	+ 0"
8	Arthur Bihannic (FRA)	+ 0"
9	Alexandre Delanoe (FRA)	+ 0"
10	Georges Groussard (FRA)	+ 0"
