= 1965 GP Ouest-France =

Race details
- Dates: 31 August 1965
- Stages: 1
- Distance: 185 km (115.0 mi)
- Winning time: 5h 00' 00"

Results
	Winner	François Goasduff (FRA)
	Second	Hubert Niel (FRA)
	Third	Jean-Louis Jagueneau (FRA)

The 1965 GP Ouest-France was the 29th edition of the GP Ouest-France cycle race and was held on 31 August 1965. The race started and finished in Plouay. The race was won by François Goasduff.

== General classification ==
Final general classification

Rank	Rider	Time
1	François Goasduff (FRA)	5h 00' 00"
2	Hubert Niel (FRA)	+ 0"
3	Jean-Louis Jagueneau (FRA)	+ 0"
4	Joseph Thomin (FRA)	+ 0"
5	Gianni Marcarini (FRA)	+ 0"
6	Jean-Louis Bodin (FRA)	+ 0"
7	Jacques Bachelot (FRA)	+ 0"
8	Pierre Le Mellec (FRA)	+ 0"
9	Joseph Velly (FRA)	+ 0"
10	François Hamon (FRA)	+ 0"
