= 1968 GP Ouest-France =

Race details
- Dates: 27 August 1968
- Stages: 1
- Distance: 200 km (124.3 mi)
- Winning time: 5h 09' 00"

Results
	Winner	Jean Jourden (FRA)
	Second	Jean-Claude Lebaube (FRA)
	Third	André Zimmermann (FRA)

The 1968 GP Ouest-France was the 32nd edition of the GP Ouest-France cycle race and was held on 27 August 1968. The race started and finished in Plouay. The race was won by Jean Jourden.

== General classification ==
Final general classification

Rank	Rider	Time
1	Jean Jourden (FRA)	5h 09' 00"
2	Jean-Claude Lebaube (FRA)	+ 35"
3	André Zimmermann (FRA)	+ 35"
4	Jean-Louis Bodin (FRA)	+ 35"
5	Claude Mazeaud (FRA)	+ 38"
6	Francis Campaner (FRA)	+ 1' 25"
7	Georges Groussard (FRA)	+ 7' 10"
8	Jean-Paul Paris (FRA)	+ 13' 55"
9	François Goasduff (FRA)	+ 13' 55"
10	Hubert Niel (FRA)	+ 13' 55"
