= Grand Prix d'Aix-en-Provence =

Race details
- Region: Aix-en-Provence, Bouches-du-Rhône, France
- Discipline: Road
- Type: One-day race
- Race director: Claude Aubert

History
- First edition: 1949
- Editions: 29
- Final edition: 1986
- First winner: Jesus Moujica (FRA)
- Most wins: Jean Anastasi (FRA) (2 wins)
- Final winner: Joël Pelier (FRA)

The Grand Prix d'Aix-en-Provence was a single-day road cycling race held in the town of Aix-en-Provence, France between 1949 and 1986.

== Winners ==
Year	Winner	Second	Third
1949	(France) Jesús Moujica	(France) Attilio Redolfi	(France) Robert Desbats
1959	(France) Jean Anastasi	(France) Gilbert Bauvin	(France) Raymond Elena
1960	(France) Claude Mattio	(France) Antoine Abate	(France) Jean-Claude Lefebvre
1961	(France) Jean Zolnowski	(France) Gilbert Salvador	(France) Anatole Novak
1962	(France) Jean Anastasi	(France) René Abadie	(France) Jean Bourlès
1963	(France) Jean Dupont	(France) Alain Vera	(Switzerland) René Binggeli
1964	(Francoist Spain) Antonio Blanco	(Belgium) Frans Melckenbeeck	(Belgium) Jean-Baptiste Claes
1965	(France) Jacques Cadiou	(Belgium) Willy Bocklant	(France) Pierre Le Mellec
1966	(France) André Zimmermann	(France) Paul Gutty	(France) Raymond Poulidor
1967	(France) Jean Jourden	(France) Jacques Cadiou	(France) Bernard Guyot
1968	(France) Jean-Marie Leblanc	(Switzerland) Francis Blanc	(Italy) Mario Drago
1969	(France) José Catieau	(France) Raymond Poulidor	(France) Cyrille Guimard
1970	(Belgium) Walter Godefroot	(Netherlands) Leo Duyndam	(France) Christian Raymond
1971	(France) Alain Santy	(Netherlands) Gerard Vianen	(Germany) Jürgen Tschan
1972	(Belgium) Bernard Delchambre	(Germany) Jürgen Tschan	(France) Jean-Claude Genty
1973	(Denmark) Leif Mortensen	(France) Jacques Esclassan	(France) Bernard Labourdette
1974	(France) Guy Sibille	(France) Cyrille Guimard	(Netherlands) Gerben Karstens
1975	(France) Maurice Le Guilloux	(France) José Alvarez	(France) Mariano Martinez
1976	(Netherlands) Roy Schuiten	(France) Régis Delépine	(France) Alain Santy
1977	(Italy) Walter Riccomi	(Belgium) Willem Peeters	(Belgium) Jean-Luc Vandenbroucke
1978	(Belgium) Roger Rosiers	(Belgium) Walter Godefroot	(Belgium) Guido Van Calster
1979	(France) André Mollet	(France) Bernard Becaas	(France) Christian Seznec
1980	(Germany) Hans-Peter Jakst	(Denmark) Kim Andersen	(United Kingdom) Paul Sherwen
1981	(Belgium) Jan Bogaert	(France) Francis Castaing	(Belgium) Jean-Luc Vandenbroucke
1982	(France) Francis Castaing	(Netherlands) Jan Raas	(United Kingdom) John Herety
1983	(France) Éric Caritoux	(Belgium) Yves Godimus	(France) Claude Moreau
1984	(Republic of Ireland) Seán Kelly	(France) Laurent Fignon	(Belgium) Jan Bogaert
1985	(Canada) Steve Bauer	(France) Joël Pelier	(France) Marcel Tinazzi
1986	(France) Joël Pelier	(Belgium) Dirk De Wolf	(France) Philippe Louviot
