= 1959 GP Ouest-France =

Race details
- Dates: 1 September 1959
- Stages: 1
- Distance: 190 km (118.1 mi)
- Winning time: 4h 58' 00"

Results
	Winner	Emmanuel Crenn (FRA)
	Second	Jean Gainche (FRA)
	Third	Félix Lebuhotel (FRA)

The 1959 GP Ouest-France was the 23rd edition of the GP Ouest-France cycle race and was held on 1 September 1959. The race started and finished in Plouay. The race was won by Emmanuel Crenn.

== General classification ==
Final general classification

Rank	Rider	Time
1	Emmanuel Crenn (FRA)	4h 58' 00"
2	Jean Gainche (FRA)	+ 1' 15"
3	Félix Lebuhotel (FRA)	+ 1' 15"
4	Jean-Marie Cieleska (FRA)	+ 1' 15"
5	Jean Ricou (FRA)	+ 1' 15"
6	Hubert Ferrer (FRA)	+ 1' 15"
7	André Foucher (FRA)	+ 1' 15"
8	Pierre Beuffeuil (FRA)	+ 1' 15"
9	Max Bléneau (FRA)	+ 1' 15"
10	Francis Mel (FRA)	+ 1' 15"
