= 1954 GP Ouest-France =

Race details
- Dates: 31 August 1954
- Stages: 1
- Distance: 196 km (121.8 mi)
- Winning time: 5h 15' 00"

Results
	Winner	Ugo Anzile (FRA)
	Second	Jean Le Guilly (FRA)
	Third	René-Jean Gadras (FRA)

The 1954 GP Ouest-France was the 18th edition of the GP Ouest-France cycle race and was held on 31 August 1954. The race started and finished in Plouay. The race was won by Ugo Anzile.

== General classification ==
Final general classification

Rank	Rider	Time
1	Ugo Anzile (FRA)	5h 15' 00"
2	Jean Le Guilly (FRA)	+ 40"
3	René-Jean Gadras (FRA)	+ 40"
4	Amand Audaire (FRA)	+ 2' 40"
5	Francis Mel (FRA)	+ 2' 40"
6	Norbert Esnault (FRA)	+ 3' 45"
7	Georges Decaux (FRA)	+ 8' 00"
8	Jean Bourlès (FRA)	+ 8' 00"
9	Georges Gilles (FRA)	+ 8' 00"
10	Eugène Telotte (FRA)	+ 8' 00"
