= 1967 GP Ouest-France =

Race details
- Dates: 29 August 1967
- Stages: 1
- Distance: 200 km (124.3 mi)
- Winning time: 5h 05' 00"

Results
	Winner	François Hamon (FRA)
	Second	Georges Chappe (FRA)
	Third	Maurice Morin (FRA)

The 1967 GP Ouest-France was the 31st edition of the GP Ouest-France cycle race and was held on 29 August 1967. The race started and finished in Plouay. The race was won by François Hamon.

== General classification ==
Final general classification

Rank	Rider	Time
1	François Hamon (FRA)	5h 05' 00"
2	Georges Chappe (FRA)	+ 0"
3	Maurice Morin (FRA)	+ 0"
4	Hubert Niel (FRA)	+ 0"
5	Christian Raymond (FRA)	+ 0"
6	Jean Dumont (FRA)	+ 0"
7	André Foucher (FRA)	+ 0"
8	Christian Leduc (FRA)	+ 0"
9	Jean-Paul Paris (FRA)	+ 0"
10	Jean Bourlès (FRA)	+ 0"
