= 1950 GP Ouest-France =

Race details
- Dates: 22 August 1950
- Stages: 1

Results
	Winner	Amand Audaire (FRA)
	Second	André Ruffet (FRA)
	Third	Germain Mercier (FRA)

The 1950 GP Ouest-France was the 14th edition of the GP Ouest-France cycle race and was held on 22 August 1950. The race started and finished in Plouay. The race was won by Amand Audaire.

== General classification ==
Final general classification

Rank	Rider	Time
1	Amand Audaire (FRA)	
2	André Ruffet (FRA)	
3	Germain Mercier (FRA)	
4	Le Pan (FRA)	
5	Jean Bobet (FRA)	
6	Jean-Marie Goasmat (FRA)	
7	Félix Le Mer (FRA)	
8	Lohier (FRA)	
9	Gicquel (FRA)	
10	Douarin (FRA)	
