= 1970 GP Ouest-France =

Race details
- Dates: 25 August 1970
- Stages: 1
- Distance: 205 km (127.4 mi)
- Winning time: 5h 34' 04"

Results
	Winner	Gianni Marcarini (FRA)	(Peugeot–BP–Michelin)
	Second	Robert Bouloux (FRA)	(Peugeot–BP–Michelin)
	Third	Roland Berland (FRA)	(Bic)

The 1970 GP Ouest-France was the 34th edition of the GP Ouest-France cycle race and was held on 25 August 1970. The race started and finished in Plouay. The race was won by Gianni Marcarini of the Peugeot team.

== General classification ==
Final general classification

Rank	Rider	Team	Time
1	Gianni Marcarini (FRA)	Peugeot–BP–Michelin	5h 34' 04"
2	Robert Bouloux (FRA)	Peugeot–BP–Michelin	+ 0"
3	Roland Berland (FRA)	Bic	+ 0"
4	Daniel Perret (FRA)	Peugeot–BP–Michelin	+ 0"
5	François Hamon (FRA)		+ 0"
6	Alain Santy (FRA)	Bic	+ 0"
7	François Le Bihan (FRA)		+ 0"
8	Georges Groussard (FRA)		+ 0"
9	Claude Mazeaud (FRA)		+ 0"
10	Jean-Claude Daunat (FRA)	Peugeot–BP–Michelin	+ 20"
