= 1971 GP Ouest-France =

Race details
- Dates: 24 August 1971
- Stages: 1
- Distance: 202 km (125.5 mi)
- Winning time: 5h 13' 10"

Results
	Winner	Jean-Pierre Danguillaume (FRA)
	Second	Jacques Gestraut (FRA)
	Third	Raymond Delisle (FRA)

The 1971 GP Ouest-France was the 35th edition of the GP Ouest-France cycle race and was held on 24 August 1971. The race started and finished in Plouay. The race was won by Jean-Pierre Danguillaume.

== General classification ==
Final general classification

Rank	Rider	Time
1	Jean-Pierre Danguillaume (FRA)	5h 13' 10"
2	Jacques Gestraut (FRA)	+ 38"
3	Raymond Delisle (FRA)	+ 3' 32"
4	Michel Perin (FRA)	+ 3' 32"
5	Gérard Moneyron (FRA)	+ 3' 32"
6	Jean-Claude Daunat (FRA)	+ 3' 32"
7	Gerben Karstens (NED)	+ 3' 35"
8	Jacques Botherel (FRA)	+ 3' 35"
9	André Foucher (FRA)	+ 3' 35"
10	François Hamon (FRA)	+ 3' 35"
