= 1963 GP Ouest-France =

Race details
- Dates: 27 August 1963
- Stages: 1
- Distance: 188 km (116.8 mi)
- Winning time: 5h 08' 00"

Results
	Winner	Fernand Picot (FRA)
	Second	Pierre Le Mellec (FRA)
	Third	Fernand Delort (FRA)

The 1963 GP Ouest-France was the 27th edition of the GP Ouest-France cycle race and was held on 27 August 1963. The race started and finished in Plouay. The race was won by Fernand Picot.

== General classification ==
Final general classification

Rank	Rider	Time
1	Fernand Picot (FRA)	5h 08' 00"
2	Pierre Le Mellec (FRA)	+ 0"
3	Fernand Delort (FRA)	+ 0"
4	Claude Mazeaud (FRA)	+ 0"
5	Jean Gainche (FRA)	+ 0"
6	Joseph Le Doarin (FRA)	+ 0"
7	Georges Groussard (FRA)	+ 0"
8	Joseph Thomin (FRA)	+ 0"
9	André Quemere (FRA)	+ 0"
10	Jean-Claude Lefebvre (FRA)	+ 0"
