= 1966 GP Ouest-France =

Race details
- Dates: 30 August 1966
- Stages: 1
- Distance: 195 km (121.2 mi)
- Winning time: 5h 17' 00"

Results
	Winner	Claude Mazeaud (FRA)
	Second	Jean Bourlès (FRA)
	Third	Pierre Le Mellec (FRA)

The 1966 GP Ouest-France was the 30th edition of the GP Ouest-France cycle race and was held on 30 August 1966. The race started and finished in Plouay. The race was won by Claude Mazeaud.

== General classification ==
Final general classification

Rank	Rider	Time
1	Claude Mazeaud (FRA)	5h 17' 00"
2	Jean Bourlès (FRA)	+ 0"
3	Pierre Le Mellec (FRA)	+ 0"
4	Jacques Cadiou (FRA)	+ 0"
5	Joseph Groussard (FRA)	+ 0"
6	François Goasduff (FRA)	+ 0"
7	Jean-Paul Paris (FRA)	+ 0"
8	Jean Dumont (FRA)	+ 0"
9	André Gislard (FRA)	+ 0"
10	Hubert Niel (FRA)	+ 0"
