= 1982 GP Ouest-France =

Race details
- Dates: 30 August 1982
- Stages: 1
- Distance: 212 km (131.7 mi)
- Winning time: 5h 15' 23"

Results
	Winner	Francis Castaing (FRA)	(Peugeot–Shell–Michelin)
	Second	Régis Clère (FRA)	(COOP–Mercier–Mavic)
	Third	Didier Vanoverschelde (FRA)	(La Redoute–Motobécane)

The 1982 GP Ouest-France was the 46th edition of the GP Ouest-France cycle race and was held on 30 August 1982. The race started and finished in Plouay. The race was won by Francis Castaing of the Peugeot team.

== General classification ==
Final general classification

Rank	Rider	Team	Time
1	Francis Castaing (FRA)	Peugeot–Shell–Michelin	5h 15' 23"
2	Régis Clère (FRA)	COOP–Mercier–Mavic	+ 0"
3	Didier Vanoverschelde (FRA)	La Redoute–Motobécane	+ 0"
4	Fabien De Vooght (FRA)	Wolber–Spidel	+ 0"
5	Jacques Bossis (FRA)	Peugeot–Shell–Michelin	+ 7"
6	Sean Kelly (IRL)	Sem–France Loire–Campagnolo	+ 9"
7	Marc Gomez (FRA)	Wolber–Spidel	+ 9"
8	Phil Anderson (AUS)	Peugeot–Shell–Michelin	+ 9"
9	Jean-François Rault (FRA)	Wolber–Spidel	+ 9"
10	Philippe Leleu (FRA)	Wolber–Spidel	+ 9"
