= 1952 GP Ouest-France =

Race details
- Dates: 26 August 1952
- Stages: 1
- Distance: 189 km (117.4 mi)
- Winning time: 5h 10' 00"

Results
	Winner	Émile Guérinel (FRA)
	Second	François Mahé (FRA)
	Third	Jean Bobet (FRA)

The 1952 GP Ouest-France was the 16th edition of the GP Ouest-France cycle race and was held on 26 August 1952. The race started and finished in Plouay. The race was won by Émile Guérinel.

== General classification ==
Final general classification

Rank	Rider	Time
1	Émile Guérinel (FRA)	5h 10' 00"
2	François Mahé (FRA)	+ 0"
3	Jean Bobet (FRA)	+ 15"
4	René Beghetti (FRA)	+ 15"
5	Gicquel (FRA)	+ 15"
6	Joalland (FRA)	+ 15"
7	Georges Gilles (FRA)	+ 2' 40"
8	Norbert Esnault (FRA)	+ 2' 40"
9	Germain Mercier (FRA)	+ 2' 40"
10	Bernard Gauthier (FRA)	+ 2' 40"
