= 1980 GP Ouest-France =

Race details
- Dates: 26 August 1980
- Stages: 1
- Distance: 200 km (124.3 mi)
- Winning time: 4h 53' 00"

Results
	Winner	Patrick Friou (FRA)	(Miko–Mercier–Vivagel)
	Second	Jacques Bossis (FRA)	(Peugeot–Esso–Michelin)
	Third	Bernard Becaas (FRA)	(Renault–Gitane)

The 1980 GP Ouest-France was the 44th edition of the GP Ouest-France cycle race and was held on 26 August 1980. The race started and finished in Plouay. The race was won by Patrick Friou of the Miko–Mercier team.

== General classification ==
Final general classification

Rank	Rider	Team	Time
1	Patrick Friou (FRA)	Miko–Mercier–Vivagel	4h 53' 00"
2	Jacques Bossis (FRA)	Peugeot–Esso–Michelin	+ 16"
3	Bernard Becaas (FRA)	Renault–Gitane	+ 16"
4	Didier Lebaud (FRA)	Miko–Mercier–Vivagel	+ 1' 20"
5	Pierre Bazzo (FRA)	La Redoute–Motobécane	+ 1' 20"
6	Alain Vigneron (FRA)	Boston–IFI–Mavic	+ 1' 20"
7	Jean-Louis Gauthier (FRA)	Miko–Mercier–Vivagel	+ 2' 55"
8	Patrick Bonnet (FRA)	Renault–Gitane	+ 2' 55"
9	Patrick Perret (FRA)	Peugeot–Esso–Michelin	+ 2' 55"
10	Marc Durant (FRA)	La Redoute–Motobécane	+ 2' 55"
