= 1957 GP Ouest-France =

Race details
- Dates: 28 August 1957
- Stages: 1
- Distance: 180 km (111.8 mi)
- Winning time: 4h 58' 00"

Results
	Winner	Isaac Vitré (FRA)
	Second	Joseph Morvan (FRA)
	Third	Joseph Groussard (FRA)

The 1957 GP Ouest-France was the 21st edition of the GP Ouest-France cycle race and was held on 28 August 1957. The race started and finished in Plouay. The race was won by Isaac Vitré.

== General classification ==
Final general classification

Rank	Rider	Time
1	Isaac Vitré (FRA)	4h 58' 00"
2	Joseph Morvan (FRA)	+ 5"
3	Joseph Groussard (FRA)	+ 5"
4	Joseph Le Cadet (FRA)	+ 5"
5	Francis Mel (FRA)	+ 5"
6	Maurice Lavigne (FRA)	+ 5"
7	Emile Le Bigault (FRA)	+ 5"
8	Joseph Mahé (FRA)	+ 5"
9	Emmanuel Crenn (FRA)	+ 5"
10	Francis Pipelin (FRA)	+ 5"
