= 1977 GP Ouest-France =

Race details
- Dates: 23 August 1977
- Stages: 1
- Winning time: 5h 33' 00"

Results
	Winner	Jacques Bossis (FRA)
	Second	Roger Legeay (FRA)
	Third	Christian Seznec (FRA)

The 1977 GP Ouest-France was the 41st edition of the GP Ouest-France cycle race and was held on 23 August 1977. The race started and finished in Plouay. The race was won by Jacques Bossis.

== General classification ==
Final general classification

Rank	Rider	Time
1	Jacques Bossis (FRA)	5h 33' 00"
2	Roger Legeay (FRA)	+ 0"
3	Christian Seznec (FRA)	+ 0"
4	André Chalmel (FRA)	+ 0"
5	Raymond Martin (FRA)	+ 15"
6	Bernard Hinault (FRA)	+ 2' 10"
7	Yvon Bertin (FRA)	+ 2' 10"
8	Jonathan Boyer (USA)	+ 2' 10"
9	Michel Le Denmat (FRA)	+ 2' 10"
10	Bernard Quilfen (FRA)	+ 2' 15"
