= 1978 GP Ouest-France =

Race details
- Dates: 22 August 1978
- Stages: 1
- Distance: 202 km (125.5 mi)
- Winning time: 4h 54' 00"

Results
	Winner	Pierre-Raymond Villemiane (FRA)
	Second	Joop Zoetemelk (NED)
	Third	Marcel Tinazzi (FRA)

The 1978 GP Ouest-France was the 42nd edition of the GP Ouest-France cycle race and was held on 22 August 1978. The race started and finished in Plouay. The race was won by Pierre-Raymond Villemiane.

== General classification ==
Final general classification

Rank	Rider	Time
1	Pierre-Raymond Villemiane (FRA)	4h 54' 00"
2	Joop Zoetemelk (NED)	+ 0"
3	Marcel Tinazzi (FRA)	+ 25"
4	Jacques Bossis (FRA)	+ 25"
5	Patrick Busolini (FRA)	+ 25"
6	Hubert Mathis (FRA)	+ 54"
7	André Mollet (FRA)	+ 3' 34"
8	Jean Chassang (FRA)	+ 3' 34"
9	Christian Muselet (FRA)	+ 3' 34"
10	Roland Berland (FRA)	+ 3' 34"
