= 1932 GP Ouest-France =

Race details
- Dates: 30 August 1932
- Stages: 1
- Distance: 160 km (99.42 mi)
- Winning time: 5h 10' 00"

Results
| | Winner | Philippe Bono (FRA) |
| | Second | Ferdinand Le Drogo (FRA) |
| | Third | Paul Le Drogo (FRA) |

The 1932 GP Ouest-France was the second edition of the GP Ouest-France cycle race and was held on 30 August 1932. The race started and finished in Plouay. The race was won by Philippe Bono.

== General classification ==
Final general classification

| Rank | Rider | Time |
|---|---|---|
| 1 | Philippe Bono (FRA) | 5h 10' 00" |
| 2 | Ferdinand Le Drogo (FRA) | + 0" |
| 3 | Paul Le Drogo (FRA) | + 0" |
| 4 | Léon Le Calvez (FRA) | + 0" |
| 5 | Ernest Neuhard (FRA) | + 0" |
| 6 | René Bernard (FRA) | + 0" |
| 7 | François Favé (FRA) | + 0" |
| 8 | Georges Allory (FRA) | + 0" |
| 8 | Lucien Allory (FRA) | + 0" |
| 8 | Fernand Mithouard (FRA) | + 0" |
