= 1979 GP Ouest-France =

Race details
- Dates: 21 August 1979
- Stages: 1
- Distance: 202 km (125.5 mi)
- Winning time: 4h 53' 00"

Results
	Winner	Frits Pirard (NED)	(Miko–Mercier–Vivagel)
	Second	Jean Chassang (FRA)	(Renault–Gitane)
	Third	Yvon Bertin (FRA)	(Renault–Gitane)

The 1979 GP Ouest-France was the 43rd edition of the GP Ouest-France cycle race and was held on 21 August 1979. The race started and finished in Plouay. The race was won by Frits Pirard of the Miko–Mercier team.

== General classification ==
Final general classification

Rank	Rider	Team	Time
1	Frits Pirard (NED)	Miko–Mercier–Vivagel	4h 53' 00"
2	Jean Chassang (FRA)	Renault–Gitane	+ 1' 40"
3	Yvon Bertin (FRA)	Renault–Gitane	+ 1' 40"
4	Patrick Bonnet (FRA)	Flandria–Ça va seul	+ 1' 40"
5	Pierre-Raymond Villemiane (FRA)	Renault–Gitane	+ 1' 40"
6	André Chalmel (FRA)	Renault–Gitane	+ 1' 40"
7	Jean-Louis Gauthier (FRA)	Miko–Mercier–Vivagel	+ 1' 40"
8	Jacques Bossis (FRA)	Peugeot–Esso–Michelin	+ 1' 40"
9	Pierre Bazzo (FRA)	La Redoute–Motobécane	+ 1' 40"
10	Pascal Simon (FRA)	Peugeot–Esso–Michelin	+ 1' 40"
