= 1988 GP Ouest-France =

Race details
- Dates: 23 August 1988
- Stages: 1
- Distance: 237 km (147.3 mi)
- Winning time: 5h 58' 44"

Results
	Winner	Luc Leblanc (FRA)	(Toshiba–Look)
	Second	Charly Mottet (FRA)	(Système U–Gitane)
	Third	Patrice Esnault (FRA)	(RMO–Cycles Méral–Mavic)

The 1988 GP Ouest-France was the 52nd edition of the GP Ouest-France cycle race and was held on 23 August 1988. The race started and finished in Plouay. The race was won by Luc Leblanc of the Toshiba team.

== General classification ==
Final general classification

Rank	Rider	Team	Time
1	Luc Leblanc (FRA)	Toshiba–Look	5h 58' 44"
2	Charly Mottet (FRA)	Système U–Gitane	+ 0"
3	Patrice Esnault (FRA)	RMO–Cycles Méral–Mavic	+ 1' 05"
4	Laurent Bezault (FRA)	Toshiba–Look	+ 1' 12"
5	Jean-François Laffillé (FRA)	Toshiba–Look	+ 2' 49"
6	Philippe Leleu (FRA)	Toshiba–Look	+ 2' 49"
7	Thomas Wegmüller (SUI)	Kas–Canal 10	+ 2' 49"
8	Ronan Pensec (FRA)	Z–Peugeot	+ 2' 52"
9	Marc Gomez (FRA)	Fagor–MBK	+ 2' 54"
10	Martin Earley (IRL)	Kas–Canal 10	+ 7' 07"
