= Vincent Cali =

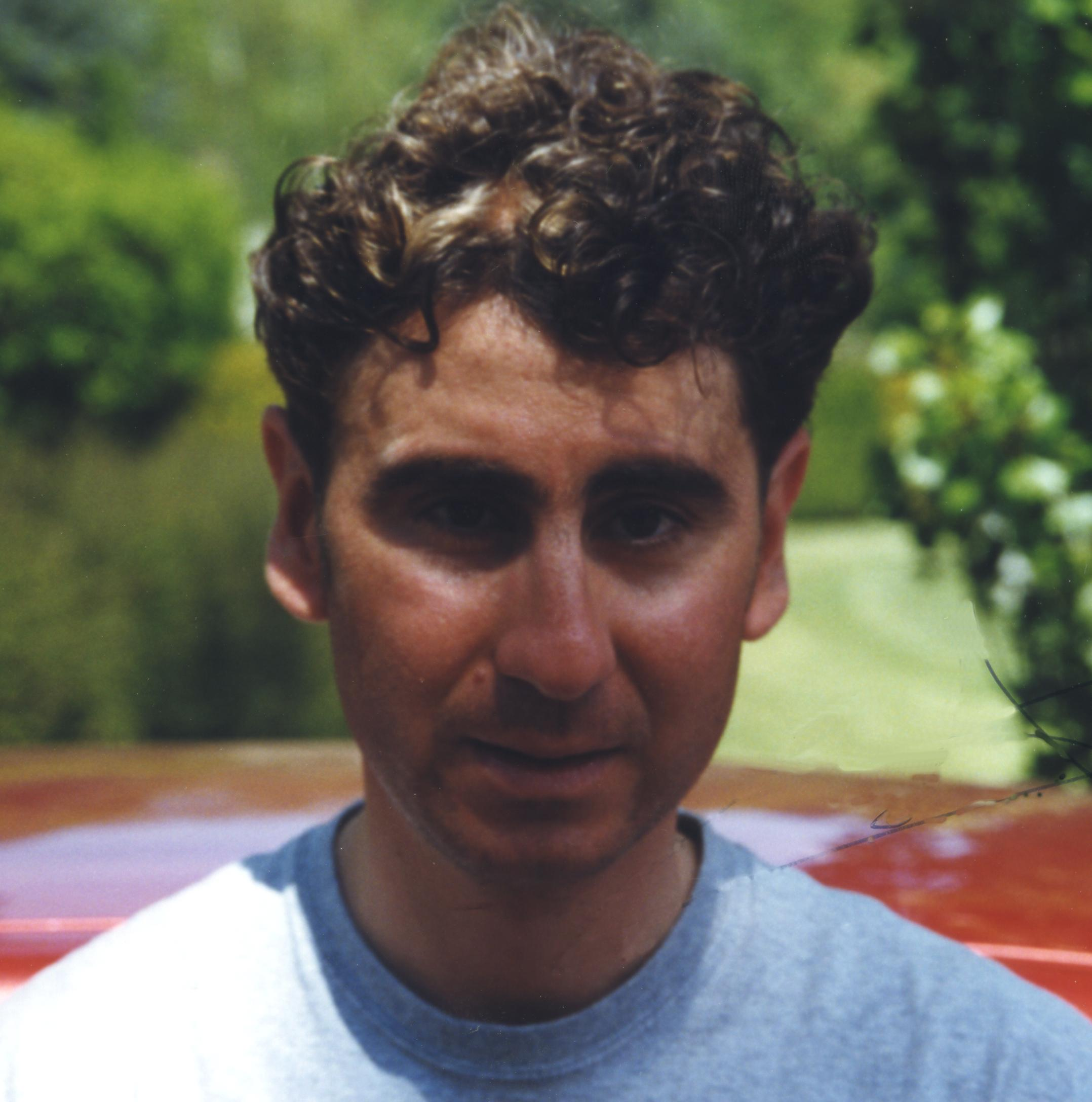
- Cali in 1999

Personal information
- Born: 22 April 1970 (age 56) Saint-Étienne, France

Cycling career
- Sport: Cycling
- Current team: Retired
- Discipline: Road
- Role: Rider

Amateur teams
- 1992: VC Lyon-Vaulx-en-Velin
- 1994: UC Sayat-Aulnat
- 1995: VC Riom
- 1996: CC Stupes

Professional teams
- 1997–1998: Casino
- 1999–2000: Home Market–Ville de Charleroi
- 2001: Collstrop–Palmans
- 2002: Landbouwkrediet–Colnago
- 2003: Flanders–iTeamNova

Vincent Cali (born 22 April 1970) is a French former road cyclist, who competed as a professional from 1997 to 2003. He most notably won the 1998 Tour du Limousin and the 1996 Ronde de l'Isard.

== Major results ==
1996
1st Overall Ronde de l'Isard
1st Grand Prix Cristal Energie
2nd Overall Mi-Août en Bretagne
1998
1st Overall Tour du Limousin

1st Stage 3

3rd Overall Tour de l'Ain
1999
2nd Boucles de l'Aulne
3rd Overall Tour Trans Canada
2000
3rd Overall Tour de la Region Wallonne
7th Overall Tour de Beauce
2001
2nd Druivenkoers-Overijse
4th Tour du Finistère
7th GP Ouest–France
2003
9th Polynormande

=== Grand Tour general classification results timeline ===
Grand Tour	1998
Giro d'Italia	DNF
Tour de France	—
Vuelta a España	51

Legend
DNF	Did not finish
