= 1948 GP Ouest-France =

Race details
- Dates: 31 August 1948
- Stages: 1
- Distance: 150 km (93.21 mi)
- Winning time: 4h 07' 00"

Results
	Winner	Eloi Tassin (FRA)
	Second	Francis Chretien (FRA)
	Third	Raymond Louviot (FRA)

The 1948 GP Ouest-France was the 12th edition of the GP Ouest-France cycle race and was held on 31 August 1948. The race started and finished in Plouay. The race was won by Eloi Tassin.

== General classification ==
Final general classification

Rank	Rider	Time
1	Eloi Tassin (FRA)	4h 07' 00"
2	Francis Chretien (FRA)	+ 1' 53"
3	Raymond Louviot (FRA)	+ 1' 53"
4	Hamono (FRA)	+ 1' 53"
5	Roger Lévêque (FRA)	+ 1' 53"
6	Basile Decortès (FRA)	+ 5' 20"
7	Jean Erussard (FRA)	+ 6' 02"
8	Georges Audrain (FRA)	+ 6' 02"
9	Chalain (FRA)	+ 8' 00"
10	Kléber Lemasson (FRA)	+ 8' 30"
