= 1933 GP Ouest-France =

Race details
- Dates: 29 August 1933
- Stages: 1
- Distance: 160 km (99.42 mi)
- Winning time: 4h 54' 00"

Results
	Winner	Philippe Bono (FRA)
	Second	Raymond Louviot (FRA)
	Third	Julien Grujeon (FRA)

The 1933 GP Ouest-France was the third edition of the GP Ouest-France cycle race and was held on 29 August 1933. The race started and finished in Plouay. The race was won by Philippe Bono.

== General classification ==
Final general classification

Rank	Rider	Time
1	Philippe Bono (FRA)	4h 54' 00"
2	Raymond Louviot (FRA)	+ 0"
3	Julien Grujeon (FRA)	+ 0"
4	Jean Bidot (FRA)	+ 0"
5	Vincent Salazard (FRA)	+ 0"
6	Pierre Cloarec (FRA)	+ 0"
7	Louis Duerloo (BEL)	+ 0"
8	J. Guegan (FRA)	+ 0"
9	Marcel Bidot (FRA)	+ 0"
10	Le Huntec (FRA)	+ 12' 00"
