= 1934 GP Ouest-France =

Race details
- Dates: 28 August 1934
- Stages: 1
- Distance: 150 km (93.21 mi)
- Winning time: 4h 51' 00"

Results
	Winner	Lucien Tulot (FRA)
	Second	Jean Keriel (FRA)
	Third	René Durin (FRA)

The 1934 GP Ouest-France was the fourth edition of the GP Ouest-France cycle race and was held on 28 August 1934. The race started and finished in Plouay. The race was won by Lucien Tulot.

== General classification ==
Final general classification

Rank	Rider	Time
1	Lucien Tulot (FRA)	4h 51' 00"
2	Jean Keriel (FRA)	+ 7' 00"
3	René Durin (FRA)	+ 10' 00"
4	Lucien Billy (FRA)	+ 10' 00"
5	François Haas (FRA)	+ 13' 00"
6	Alfred Morillon (FRA)	+ 19' 00"
7	Joseph Goasmat (FRA)	+ 19' 00"
8	Thual (FRA)	+ 22' 00"
9	Bellil (FRA)	+ 25' 00"
10	Alexander Kermorgant (FRA)	+ 26' 00"
