= 1935 GP Ouest-France =

Race details
- Dates: 27 August 1935
- Stages: 1
- Distance: 140 km (86.99 mi)
- Winning time: 3h 55' 30"

Results
	Winner	Jean Le Dily (FRA)
	Second	E. Le Gallo (FRA)
	Third	Raymond Drouet (FRA)

The 1935 GP Ouest-France was the fifth edition of the GP Ouest-France cycle race and was held on 27 August 1935. The race started and finished in Plouay. The race was won by Jean Le Dily.

== General classification ==
Final general classification

Rank	Rider	Time
1	Jean Le Dily (FRA)	3h 55' 30"
2	E. Le Gallo (FRA)	+ 0"
3	Raymond Drouet (FRA)	+ 3' 40"
4	François Jafffredou (FRA)	+ 3' 50"
5	Germain Nicot (FRA)	+ 3' 50"
6	Jean Martin (FRA)	+ 3' 50"
7	Henri Drouet (FRA)	+ 3' 50"
8	Guillou (FRA)	+ 3' 50"
8	Sylvère Jezo (FRA)	+ 3' 50"
8	Louis Perron (FRA)	+ 3' 50"
