= 2000 Tour de la Région Wallonne =

Race details
- Dates: 29 July–3 August 2000
- Stages: 6
- Distance: 1,104 km (686.0 mi)
- Winning time: 28h 07' 31"

Results
	Winner	Axel Merckx (BEL)
	Second	Björn Leukemans (BEL)
	Third	Vincent Cali (FRA)

The 2000 Tour de la Région Wallonne was the 27th edition of the Tour de Wallonie cycle race and was held on 29 July to 3 August 2000. The race started in Aubel and finished in Charleroi. The race was won by Axel Merckx.

== General classification ==
Final general classification

Rank	Rider	Time
1	Axel Merckx (BEL)	28h 07' 31"
2	Björn Leukemans (BEL)	+ 44"
3	Vincent Cali (FRA)	+ 47"
4	Peter Farazijn (BEL)	+ 1' 06"
5	Marc Streel (BEL)	+ 1' 11"
6	Jamie Burrow (GBR)	+ 1' 19"
7	Jo Planckaert (BEL)	+ 10' 26"
8	Christopher Jenner (AUS)	+ 10' 39"
9	Fabrizio Guidi (ITA)	+ 10' 43"
10	Frédéric Finot (FRA)	+ 10' 53"
