= 2001 GP Ouest-France =

Race details
- Dates: 2 September 2001
- Stages: 1
- Distance: 198 km (123.0 mi)
- Winning time: 4h 30' 39"

Results
	Winner	Nico Mattan (BEL)	(Cofidis)
	Second	Patrice Halgand (FRA)	(Jean Delatour)
	Third	Patrick Jonker (NED)	(BigMat–Auber 93)

The 2001 GP Ouest-France was the 65th edition of the GP Ouest-France cycle race and was held on 2 September 2001. The race started and finished in Plouay. The race was won by Nico Mattan of the Cofidis team.

== General classification ==
Final general classification

Rank	Rider	Team	Time
1	Nico Mattan (BEL)	Cofidis	4h 30' 39"
2	Patrice Halgand (FRA)	Jean Delatour	+ 1"
3	Patrick Jonker (NED)	BigMat–Auber 93	+ 1"
4	Serge Baguet (BEL)	Lotto–Adecco	+ 15"
5	Mario Aerts (BEL)	Lotto–Adecco	+ 15"
6	David Moncoutié (FRA)	Cofidis	+ 15"
7	Vincent Cali (FRA)	Collstrop–Palmans	+ 18"
8	Benoît Salmon (FRA)	AG2R Prévoyance	+ 25"
9	Janek Tombak (EST)	Cofidis	+ 59"
10	Beat Zberg (SUI)	Rabobank	+ 59"
