= 1986 GP Ouest-France =

Race details
- Dates: 26 August 1986
- Stages: 1
- Distance: 225 km (140 mi)
- Winning time: 5h 50' 54"

Results
	Winner	Martial Gayant (FRA)	(Système U)
	Second	Sean Kelly (IRL)	(Kas)
	Third	Søren Lilholt (DEN)	(Système U)

The 1986 GP Ouest-France was the 50th edition of the GP Ouest-France cycle race and was held on 26 August 1986. The race started and finished in Plouay. The race was won by Martial Gayant of the Système U team.

== General classification ==
Final general classification

Rank	Rider	Team	Time
1	Martial Gayant (FRA)	Système U	5h 50' 54"
2	Sean Kelly (IRL)	Kas	+ 0"
3	Søren Lilholt (DEN)	Système U	+ 0"
4	Jean-Louis Peillon (FRA)	RMO–Cycles Méral–Mavic	+ 1"
5	Pedro Muñoz (ESP)	Fagor	+ 4"
6	Frédéric Brun (FRA)	Peugeot–Shell	+ 12"
7	Philippe Chevallier (FRA)	La Vie Claire	+ 22"
8	Patrice Esnault (FRA)	Kas	+ 29"
9	Laurent Biondi (FRA)	Système U	+ 1' 04"
10	Pierre Le Bigaut (FRA)	RMO–Cycles Méral–Mavic	+ 1' 04"
