= 1937 GP Ouest-France =

Race details
- Dates: 1 September 1937
- Stages: 1
- Distance: 160 km (99.42 mi)
- Winning time: 4h 50' 00"

Results
	Winner	Jean-Marie Goasmat (FRA)
	Second	Robert Oubron (FRA)
	Third	Amédée Fournier (FRA)

The 1937 GP Ouest-France was the seventh edition of the GP Ouest-France cycle race and was held on 1 September 1937. The race started and finished in Plouay. The race was won by Jean-Marie Goasmat.

== General classification ==
Final general classification

Rank	Rider	Time
1	Jean-Marie Goasmat (FRA)	4h 50' 00"
2	Robert Oubron (FRA)	+ 0"
3	Amédée Fournier (FRA)	+ 6' 00"
4	Lucien Lauk (FRA)	+ 6' 00"
5	Sylvère Jezo (FRA)	+ 6' 00"
6	Troussard (FRA)	+ 6' 00"
7	Roger Chene (FRA)	+ 11' 25"
8	Claude Goutal (FRA)	+ 12' 00"
9	Laudrin (FRA)	+ 12' 00"
10	Armand Le Moal (FRA)	+ 12' 00"
