= 1935 Tour of Flanders =

Race details
- Dates: 14 April 1935
- Stages: 1
- Distance: 260 km (161.6 mi)
- Winning time: 7h 27' 00"

Results
	Winner	Louis Duerloo (BEL)
	Second	Éloi Meulenberg (BEL)
	Third	Cornelius Leemans (BEL)

The 19th edition of the Tour of Flanders cycling classic race was held on Sunday, 14 April 1935. Belgian Louis Duerloo won the Monument. Of the 140 starting cyclists, 28 reached the finish.

== Route ==
The race started in Ghent and covered 260 km on the way to the finish in Wetteren.

The course featured 3 categorized climbs:

- Kwaremont
- Kruisberg
- Edelareberg

== Race report ==
Louis Duerloo won in the sprint ahead of his breakaway companions in Wetteren. Compatriots Éloi Meulenberg and Cornelius Leemans completed the podium. Duerloo finished the race with an average of 34.899 km/h.

== General classification ==
=== Final general classification ===
Rank	Rider	Team	Time
1	Louis Duerloo (BEL)	Genial Lucifer	7h 27' 00"
2	Éloi Meulenberg (BEL)	Alcyon–Dunlop	s.t.
3	Cornelius Leemans (BEL)	Genial Lucifer	s.t.
4	Joseph Moerenhout (BEL)	Dilecta–Wolber	s.t.
5	Gerrit Van De Ruit (NED)	Dossche Sport	s.t.
6	Léopold Roosemont (BEL)	Colin–Wolber	s.t.|
7	Jules Lowie (BEL)	Genial Lucifer	s.t.
8	Edgard De Caluwé (BEL)	Dilecta–Wolber	+ 2'00"
9	Frans van Hassel (BEL)	Genial Lucifer	s.t.
10	Gaston Rebry (BEL)	Alcyon–Dunlop	+ 2'15"
