= Boucles de l'Aulne =

French one-day road cycling race

Race details
- Date: May or June
- Region: Brittany, France
- Local name: Boucles de l'Aulne (in French)
- Discipline: Road race
- Competition: UCI Europe Tour
- Type: Single-day
- Web site: www.bouclesdelaulne.com

History
- First edition: 1931
- Editions: 86 (as of 2026) (Note: The race has been held 4 times as the Grand Prix Le Télégramme de Brest (1931–34), 56 times as the Circuit de l'Aulne (1935–98), and 21 times as the Boucles de l'Aulne (1999–present).)
- First winner: Ferdinand Le Drogo (FRA)
- Most wins: Bernard Hinault (FRA) (4 wins)
- Most recent: Jon Barrenetxea (ESP)

Boucles de l'Aulne is a single-day road bicycle race held annually in May or June around Châteaulin, in the region of Brittany, France. Since 2006, the race is organized as a 1.1 event on the UCI Europe Tour.

It was previously known as Grand Prix Le Télégramme de Brest and Circuit de l'Aulne. In 2011, it became part of the French Road Cycling Cup.

== Winners ==
Year	Country	Rider	Team
1931	France	Ferdinand Le Drogo	Dilecta–Wolber
1932	France	Ferdinand Le Drogo	Dilecta–Wolber
1933	France	Pierre-Marie Cloarec (victory shared with François Favé)	Roold–Wolber
1933	France	François Favé (victory shared with Pierre-Marie Cloarec)	Roold–Wolber
1934	France	Jean-Marie Goasmat	Roold–Wolber
1935	France	Pierre-Marie Cloarec	Roold–Wolber
1936	France	Pierre-Marie Cloarec	Roold–Wolber
1937	France	Pierre Cogan	Mercier–Hutchinson
1938	France	Pierre Cogan	Mercier–Hutchinson
1939– 1944	No race		
1945	France	Sylvère Jezo	Dilecta–Wolber
1946	Belgium	Roger Lambrecht	Stella–Hutchinson
1947	France	Guy Butteux	Mercier–Hutchinson
1948	France	Amand Audaire	Stella–Dunlop
1949	France	Louison Bobet	Stella–Dunlop
1950	France	Pierre Molinéris	Stella–Dunlop
1951	France	Robert Desbats	Mercier–Hutchinson
1952	Belgium	Rik Van Steenbergen	Mercier–Hutchinson
1953	France	Louison Bobet	Stella–Wolber–Dunlop
1954	France	Fernand Picot	Arrow
1955	France	Jacques Dupont	La Perle–Hutchinson
1956	France	Valentin Huot	Mercier–BP–Hutchinson
1957	France	Amand Audaire	Arrow–Hutchinson
1958	France	Gérard Saint	Saint-Raphaël–R. Geminiani–Dunlop
1959	France	Jean Gainche	Mercier–BP–Hutchinson
1960	France	Jean Stablinski	Helyett–Leroux–Fynsec–Hutchinson
1961	France	Joseph Morvan	Saint-Raphaël–R. Geminiani–Dunlop
1962	France	Jacques Anquetil	Saint-Raphaël–Helyett–Hutchinson
1963	Belgium	Rik Van Looy	G.B.C.–Libertas
1964	Belgium	Rik Van Looy	Solo–Superia
1965	France	Guy Ignolin	Ford France–Gitane
1966	Belgium	Eddy Merckx	Peugeot–BP–Michelin
1967	France	Raymond Poulidor	Mercier–BP–Hutchinson
1968	France	Jacques Anquetil	Bic
1969	Belgium	Eddy Merckx	Faema
1970	Belgium	Walter Godefroot	Salvarani
1971	Spain	Luis Ocaña	Bic
1972	France	Cyrille Guimard	Gan–Mercier–Hutchinson
1973	Belgium	Roger De Vlaeminck	Brooklyn
1974	Belgium	Herman Van Springel	MIC–Ludo–de Gribaldy
1975	Belgium	Eddy Merckx	Molteni–RYC
1976	Netherlands	Joop Zoetemelk	Gan–Mercier–Hutchinson
1977	No race due to being held as the Critérium des As		
1978	France	Bernard Hinault	Renault–Gitane–Campagnolo
1979	France	Bernard Hinault	Renault–Gitane
1980	Belgium	Daniel Willems	IJsboerke–Warncke Eis
1981	France	Bernard Hinault	Renault–Elf–Gitane
1982	Italy	Francesco Moser	Famcucine–Campagnolo
1983	France	Laurent Fignon	Renault–Elf
1984	France	Marc Madiot	Renault–Elf
1985	France	Bernard Hinault	La Vie Claire
1986	No race due to being held as the French National Road Race Championships		
1987	France	Gilbert Duclos-Lassalle	Vétements Z–Peugeot
1988	France	Franck Pineau	RMO–Cycles Méral–Mavic
1989	France	Charly Mottet	RMO
1990	France	Ronan Pensec	Z–Tomasso
1991	France	Jean-François Bernard	Banesto
1992	Spain	Miguel Induráin	Banesto
1993	France	Gérard Rué	Banesto
1994	France	Richard Virenque	Festina–Lotus
1995	France	Laurent Jalabert	ONCE
1996	Spain	Abraham Olano	Mapei–GB
1997	France	Laurent Jalabert	ONCE
1998	Italy	Marco Pantani	Mercatone Uno–Bianchi
1999	France	Claude Lamour	Cofidis
2000	France	Walter Bénéteau	Bonjour
2001	France	Patrice Halgand	Jean Delatour
2002	France	Christopher Jenner	Crédit Agricole
2003	France	Walter Bénéteau	Brioches La Boulangère
2004	France	Frédéric Finot	R.A.G.T. Semences–MG Rover
2005	No race		
2006	Belgium	Johan Coenen	Unibet.com
2007	France	Romain Feillu	Agritubel
2008	France	Romain Feillu	Agritubel
2009	France	Maxime Bouet	Agritubel
2010	France	Jean-Luc Delpech	Bretagne–Schuller
2011	Netherlands	Martijn Keizer	Vacansoleil–DCM
2012	France	Sébastien Hinault	Ag2r–La Mondiale
2013	France	Mathieu Ladagnous	FDJ
2014	France	Alexis Gougeard	Ag2r–La Mondiale
2015	Estonia	Alo Jakin	Auber 93
2016	France	Samuel Dumoulin	AG2R La Mondiale
2017	Norway	Odd Christian Eiking	FDJ
2018	France	Kévin Le Cunff	St. Michel–Auber93
2019	France	Alexis Gougeard	AG2R La Mondiale
2020	No race due to the COVID-19 pandemic in France		
2021	Belgium	Stan Dewulf	AG2R Citroën Team
2022	Norway	Idar Andersen	Uno-X Pro Cycling Team
2023	Belgium	Greg Van Avermaet	AG2R Citroën Team
2024	France	Axel Zingle	Cofidis
2025	Great Britain	Lewis Askey	Groupama–FDJ
2026	Spain	Jon Barrenetxea	Movistar Team
