= Roland Berland =

French cyclist

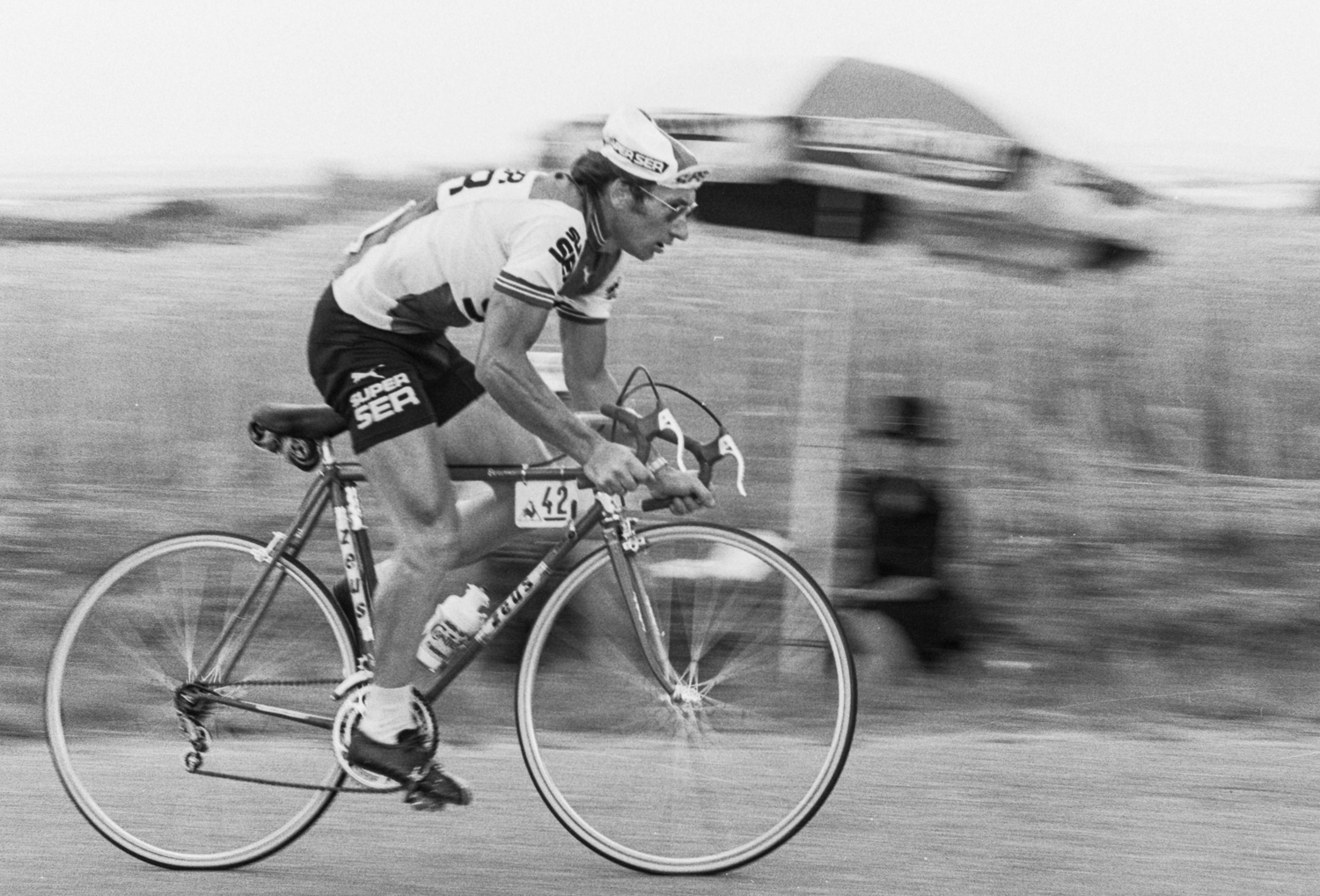
- Berland at the 1976 Tour de France

Personal information
- Full name: Roland Berland
- Born: 26 February 1945 (age 81) Saint-Laurent-de-la-Salle, France

Cycling career
- Sport: Cycling
- Discipline: Road
- Role: Rider

Professional teams
- 1968–1974: Bic
- 1975–1976: Super Ser
- 1977: Gitane–Campagnolo
- 1978–1980: Renault–Gitane–Campagnolo

Managerial team
- 1981–1986: Peugeot–Esso–Michelin

Roland Berland (born 26 February 1945) is a French former racing cyclist. He won the French national road race title in 1972 and 1979.

== Major results ==
1966
4th Overall Circuit du Morbihan

1st Stage 2

1969
5th Critérium National de la Route
1970
3rd Critérium National de la Route
9th Overall Tour of the Basque Country

1st Stage 1

1971
3rd Züri-Metzgete
3rd Overall Tour de l'Oise
1972
1st Road race, National Road Championships
4th Paris–Bourges
5th Rund um den Henninger Turm
1973
1st Paris–Bourges
1974
9th Critérium National de la Route
1977
1st Stage 1b Tour du Tarn
3rd Critérium National de la Route
3rd GP Ouest–France
1978
1st Stage 2 Tour de Corse
8th Critérium National de la Route
10th GP Ouest–France
1979
1st Road race, National Road Championships
8th GP de la Ville de Rennes
1980
2nd Bordeaux–Paris

=== Grand Tour general classification results timeline ===
Grand Tour	1968	1969	1970	1971	1972	1973	1974	1975	1976	1977	1978
Giro d'Italia	64	—	—	—	—	—	—	—	—	—	—
Tour de France	—	53	77	37	40	28	33	—	72	33	—
Vuelta a España	—	—	—	—	—	—	—	—	37	—	44

Legend
—	Did not compete
DNF	Did not finish
