= Lilian Jégou =

French cyclist

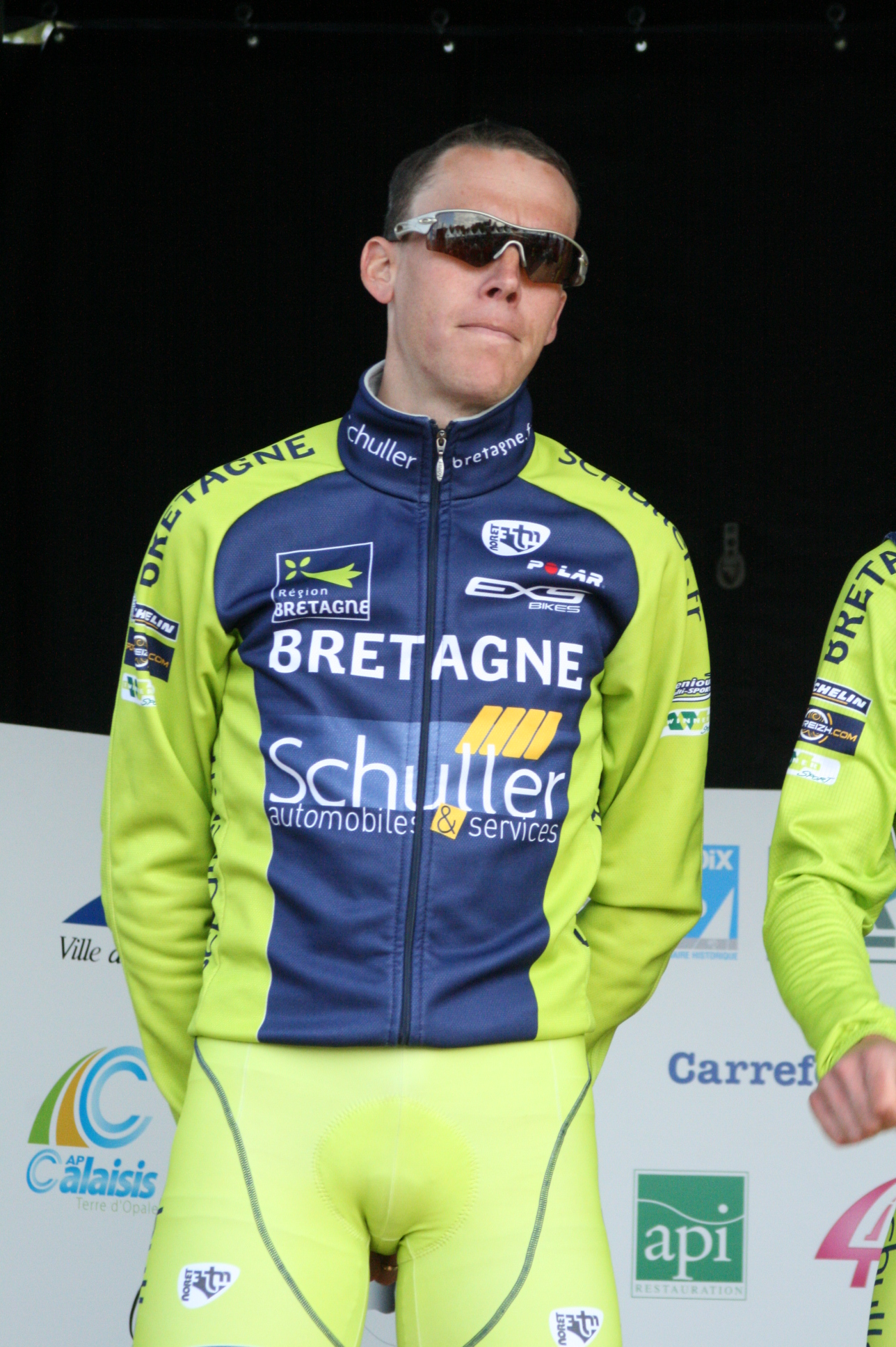

Personal information
- Full name: Lilian Jégou
- Born: 20 January 1976 (age 50) Nantes, France

Cycling career
- Sport: Cycling
- Discipline: Road
- Role: Rider

Professional teams
- 2003–2004: Crédit Agricole
- 2005–2008: Française des Jeux

Lilian Jégou (born 20 January 1976 in Nantes) is a French road racing cyclist.

Jégou made his professional debut in 2002 when he signed for Crédit Agricole as stagiaire. A year later he would make his Tour de France debut, but withdrew after stage 8 which led to l'Alpe d'Huez. In 2005 he made his second giant tour appearance when he took part in the Giro d'Italia and finished in 98th position at the arrival in Milan.

After several second and third places he won his first race in 2006. In Kango, Gabon he won the second stage of the La Tropicale Amissa Bongo. A year later in 2007 he would win the fourth stage of this race in Mitzic. Later that year he would improve his Giro d'Italia record by finishing in 75th position this time. He also took part in the 2007 Tour de France.

Having taken the combativity award in the first stage of the 2008 Tour de France, Jégou, riding for Francaise des Jeux was forced to abandon midway through Stage 7 from Brioude to Aurillac after fracturing his wrist in a collision with a tree. His contract with Francaise des Jeux expired at the end of that season.

== Major results ==
2001
1st Overall in General Classification Mi-Août Bretonne
3rd, Prix Xavier Louarn
2002
1st Overall in General Classification Mi-Août Bretonne
2nd, Circuit de la Nive
3rd, Prix des Blés d'Or
2005
2nd, Classic Haribo
3rd, Bournezeau, Cyclo-cross
98th, Overall, Giro d'Italia
2006
1st, Stage 2, La Tropicale Amissa Bongo
2007
1st, Stage 4, La Tropicale Amissa Bongo
1st, Stage 2, Tour du Limousin
75th, Overall, Giro d'Italia
97th, Overall, Tour de France
2008
1st, Overall, La Tropicale Amissa Bongo
Combative rider for Stage 1 of the Tour de France
