= Jamie Burrow =

British cyclist

Personal information
- Born: 23 January 1977 (age 49)

Cycling career
- Sport: Cycling
- Current team: Retired
- Discipline: Road
- Role: Rider

Professional teams
- 2000–2001: U.S. Postal Service
- 2002–2005: Amore & Vita–Beretta
- 2006: OTC Doors–Lauretana

Jamie Burrow (born 23 January 1977) is a British former professional road racing cyclist.

== Career ==
Aged 12, Burrow started racing in time trials, encouraged by his parents who were both racing cyclists. In 1996, aged 19, Burrow left the UK to race full-time as an amateur in France. He then went to Italy to become a professional cyclist.

In 1999, Burrow won the Under-23 World Cup and soon after signed his first professional contract with the U.S. Postal Service Pro Cycling Team. Burrow has expressed regret about this decision, saying he picked the wrong team and his career may have taken a different direction with another team.

In 2002, Burrow stepped down a division and signed with Amore & Vita. Here, he had an increase in race days but the race programme didn't suit him, as there were a lot of one day races in Italy rather than mountainous stage races.

In 2006, Burrow signed his final professional contract with OTC Doors–Lauretana, where his biggest result was finishing 7th overall in the Brixia Tour. After his professional career finished, Burrow participated in Gran Fondos as a way of making a living.

== Major results ==
1998
2nd Gran Premio di Poggiana
1999
1st Overall Ronde de l'Isard

1st Stages 2 & 3

2nd Piccolo Giro di Lombardia
2000
6th Overall Tour de la Région Wallonne
2003
4th Overall Giro della Liguria
6th Giro del Lago Maggiore
2004
2nd Overall Bałtyk–Karkonosze Tour
4th Road race, National Road Championships
4th Giro del Lago Maggiore
9th Overall Settimana Ciclistica Lombarda
2005
2nd Trofeo Franco Balestra
5th Time trial, National Road Championships
7th Overall Settimana Ciclistica Lombarda
2006
7th Overall Brixia Tour
10th Gran Premio Città di Camaiore
