= Patrice Esnault =

French cyclist

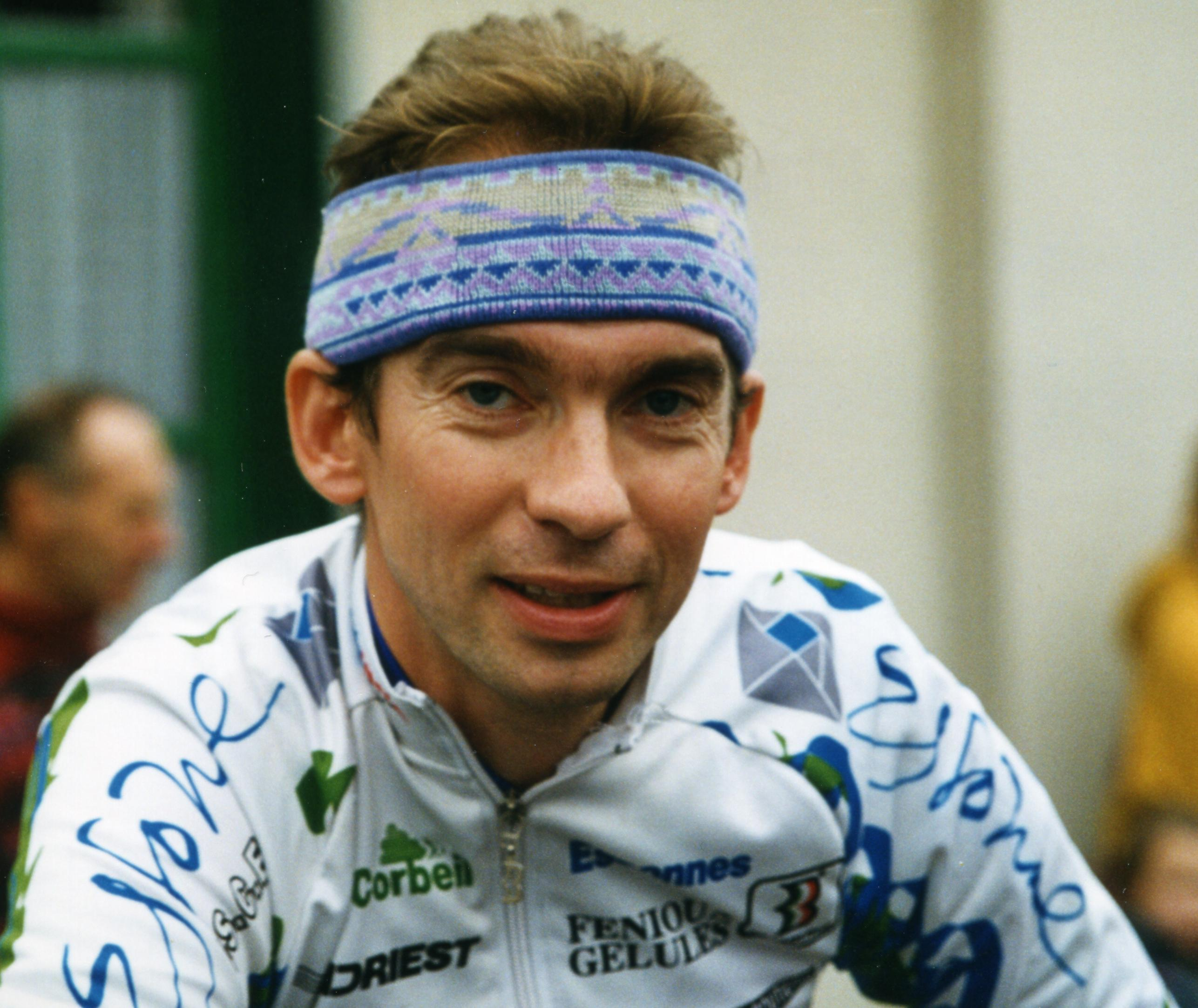
- Patrice Esnault in 1994

Personal information
- Born: 12 June 1961 (age 65) Orléans, France

Cycling career
- Sport: Cycling
- Discipline: Road
- Role: Rider

Amateur teams
- 1977–1983: CG Orléans
- 1984: CC Wasquehal

Professional teams
- 1985: Skil–Sem–Kas–Miko
- 1986: Kas
- 1987–1989: RMO–Cycles Méral–Mavic
- 1990–1991: BH–Amaya Seguros
- 1992–1993: Chazal–Vanille et Mûre
- 1994: Catavana–AS Corbeil–Essonnes–Cedico

Major wins
- Grand Tours Vuelta a España 1 individual stage (1990) Stage races Grand Prix du Midi Libre (1987)

Patrice Esnault (born 12 June 1961) is a French former professional racing cyclist. He rode in five editions of the Tour de France and four editions of the Vuelta a España, notably winning a stage of the 1990 Vuelta a España.

== Major results ==
1982
3rd Chrono des Herbiers
1983
2nd Chrono des Herbiers
1984
1st Chrono des Herbiers
1st Grand Prix des Marbriers
2nd Grand Prix de France
1985
1st Stage 1 Troféu Joaquim Agostinho
1986
2nd Overall Tour de la Communauté Européenne
4th Overall Tour Méditerranéen

1st Stage 4

4th GP de la Ville de Rennes
8th GP Ouest-France
8th Grand Prix des Nations
1987
1st Overall Grand Prix du Midi Libre
2nd Overall Four Days of Dunkirk
8th GP Eddy Merckx
1988
1st Overall Paris–Bourges

1st Stage 1

1st Stage 5 Paris–Nice
3rd GP Ouest-France
6th Overall Grand Prix du Midi Libre
9th Tour du Haut Var
1989
1st Bordeaux–Caudéran
5th Chrono des Herbiers
6th Overall Circuit Cycliste Sarthe
8th Overall Grand Prix du Midi Libre
1990
1st Stage 5 Vuelta a España
7th Chrono des Herbiers
1991
9th Overall Tour of the Basque Country
1992
1st Paris–Camembert
5th Overall Circuit Cycliste Sarthe
8th Grand Prix d'Ouverture La Marseillaise
10th Trophée des Grimpeurs

=== Grand Tour general classification results timeline ===
Grand Tour	1985	1986	1987	1988	1989	1990	1991	1992	1993
Vuelta a España	DNF	—	—	—	59	DNF	98	—	—
Giro d'Italia	—	—	—	—	—	—	—	—	—
Tour de France	—	DNF	DNF	78	—	—	28	—	119
