= Louis Duerloo =

Belgian cyclist

Personal information
- Full name: Louis Duerloo
- Born: 7 July 1910 Essen, Belgium
- Died: 30 September 1977 (aged 67) Mijas, Spain

Cycling career
- Sport: Cycling
- Role: Rider

Professional teams
- 1932: Bury
- 1933–1936: Genial Lucifer-Hutchinson
- 1937–1938: Bury

Major wins
- One-day races and Classics National Road Race Championships (1933) Tour of Flanders (1935)

Louis Duerloo (7 July 1910 – 30 September 1977) was a Belgian racing cyclist. He won the Belgian national road race title in 1933 and the Tour of Flanders in 1935.

== Major results ==
1932
1st Omloop van het Houtland
3rd Prix de St. Amands
5th Nationale Sluitingsprijs
1933
1st Road race, National Road Championships
2nd Nationale Sluitingsprijs
3rd Scheldeprijs
7th Circuit de Plouay
1934
1st Ronde van Haspengouw
1st Stage 7 Tour de l'Ouest
1935
1st Tour of Flanders
3rd Paris–Belfort
4th Nationale Sluitingsprijs
4th Acht van Chaam
5th Scheldeprijs
5th Paris–Brussels
1936
1st Omloop Groot Oostende
1st Bruxelles-Hozémont
1937
3rd Nationale Sluitingsprijs
