= Christian Raymond =

French cyclist

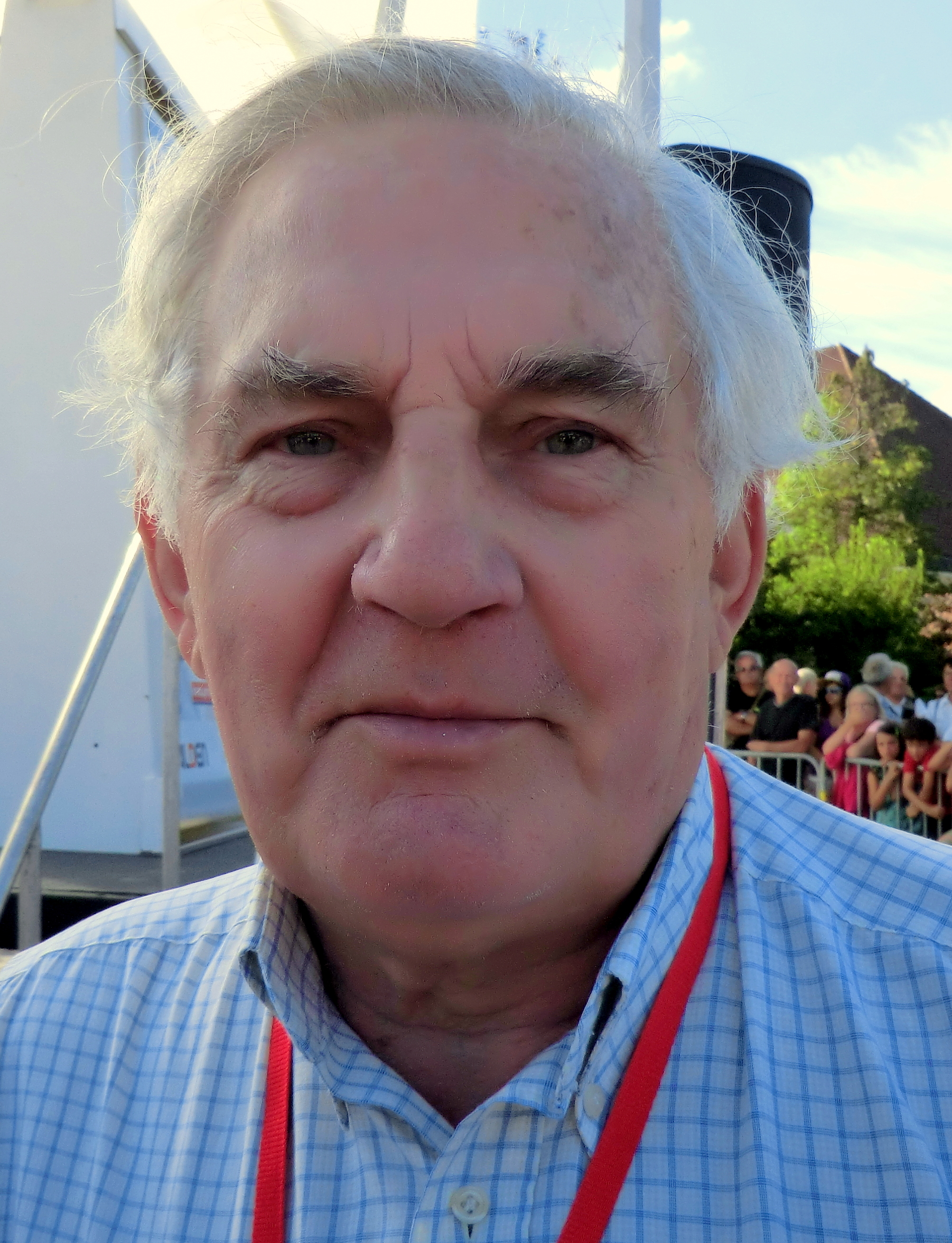
- Raymond at the 2013 Tour de l'Avenir

Personal information
- Full name: Christian Raymond
- Born: 24 December 1943 (age 82) Avrillé, France

Cycling career
- Sport: Cycling
- Disciplines: Road; Track
- Role: Rider

Professional teams
- 1965–1973: Peugeot–BP–Michelin
- 1974–1975: Gan–Mercier–Hutchinson

Major wins
- Grand Tours Tour de France 1 individual stage (1970)
Medal record
Men's track cycling
Representing France
World Championships
Bronze medal – third place	1973 San Sebastián	Motor-paced

Christian Raymond (born 24 December 1943) is a French former professional road bicycle racer. In 1970 Raymond won a stage in the 1970 Tour de France. He also competed in the individual road race at the 1964 Summer Olympics.

Raymond's 12-year-old daughter was the source of the nickname of the great cyclist Eddy Merckx. Raymond was a rider in the Peugeot team in 1969. When he explained to his daughter how the race had gone, she said: "That Belgian, he doesn't even leave you the crumbs... he's a cannibal." The nickname stuck.

== Major results ==
1964
1st Overall Route de France

1st Stages 6 & 7

1st Stage 9 Tour de l'Avenir
1965
2nd Overall Tour de l'Oise
3rd Manx Trophy
10th Overall Grand Prix du Midi Libre
1966
4th Overall Critérium du Dauphiné Libéré

1st Stage 3

6th Overall Tour de l'Oise
1967
5th GP Ouest-France
6th Critérium International
1969
2nd Ronde de Seignelay
8th Critérium International
1970
1st Stage 19 Tour de France
3rd Road race, National Road Championships
7th Overall Paris–Nice
10th Critérium International
1971
1st Stage 3 Grand Prix du Midi Libre
2nd Overall Tour d'Indre-et-Loire
3rd Overall Tour de Corse

1st Stage 1a

1972
1st Prologue (TTT) Critérium du Dauphiné Libéré
3rd Paris–Camembert
5th Critérium International
1974
1st Circuit des genêts verts
1st Stage 4 Tour de Romandie
2nd Critérium International
3rd Overall Tour d'Indre-et-Loire
