= Léon-Paul Ménard =

French cyclist

Personal information
- Born: 4 February 1946
- Died: 11 October 1993 (aged 47)

Cycling career
- Sport: Cycling
- Role: Rider

Léon-Paul Ménard (4 February 1946 – 11 October 1993) was a French racing cyclist. He rode in the 1972 Tour de France.
