= Mi-Août en Bretagne =

Race details
- Date: August
- Region: Brittany, France
- English name: Mid-August Brittany
- Discipline: Road race
- Competition: UCI Europe Tour
- Organiser: Rémi Madec
- Web site: www.miaoutbretonne.com/course-velo-mi-aout-bretonne.php

History
- First edition: 1960
- Editions: 24
- Final edition: 2012
- First winner: Fernand Picot (FRA)
- Most wins: Philippe Dalibard (FRA); Lilian Jégou (FRA) (2 wins)
- Final winner: David Veilleux (CAN)

Mi-Août en Bretagne is a French cycling road race that was established in 1960. It is held in the region of Brittany, France. It is rated 2.2 on the UCI Europe Tour. The original race ran from 1960 to 1966. It was then re-established in 1978 by Louis Bihannic. Prior to the 2009 season the race was previously categorised as 1.5 on the UCI Europe Tour; by the final edition in 2012, it was categorised as 2.2. Citing financial problems, the race was not held after 2012.

== Classification jerseys ==
Riders aim to win overall but there are five further competitions: points, mountains, the best young rider, best placed non French rider, best placed rider from Brittany and combined points leader. The leader of each wears a distinctive jersey. A rider who leads more than one competition wears the jersey of the most prestigious. The abandoned jersey is worn by the second in the competition.

General classification
Sprinters points classification
Mountains classification
Best placed non French rider in General classification (has now been abolished)
Combined points leader
Young rider classification

== Winners ==
Year	Country	Rider	Team
1961	France	Fernand Picot	
1962	France	Jean Gainche	
1963	France	Jean Bourles	
1979	France	Philippe Dalibard	
1980	France	Philippe Dalibard	
1992	France	François Simon	
1995	France	Nicolas Jalabert	
1996	France	David Delrieu	
1997	France	Anthony Morin	
1998	France	Jean-Michel Tessier	
1999	France	Stéphane Ravaleu	
2000	Australia	Jamie Drew	
2001	France	Lilian Jégou	
2002	France	Lilian Jégou	
2003	France	Mickaël Buffaz	
2004	France	Stéphane Conan	
2005	France	Frédéric Lubach	
2006	Bulgaria	Stephan Kushlev	
2007	Kenya	Chris Froome	
2008	Poland	Piotr Zieliński	
2009	Norway	Frederik Wilmann	
2010	France	Jean-Luc Delpech	Bretagne–Schuller
2011	Great Britain	Mark McNally	An Post–Sean Kelly
2012	Canada	David Veilleux	Team Europcar
