= Jacques Gestraut =

French cyclist (born 1939)

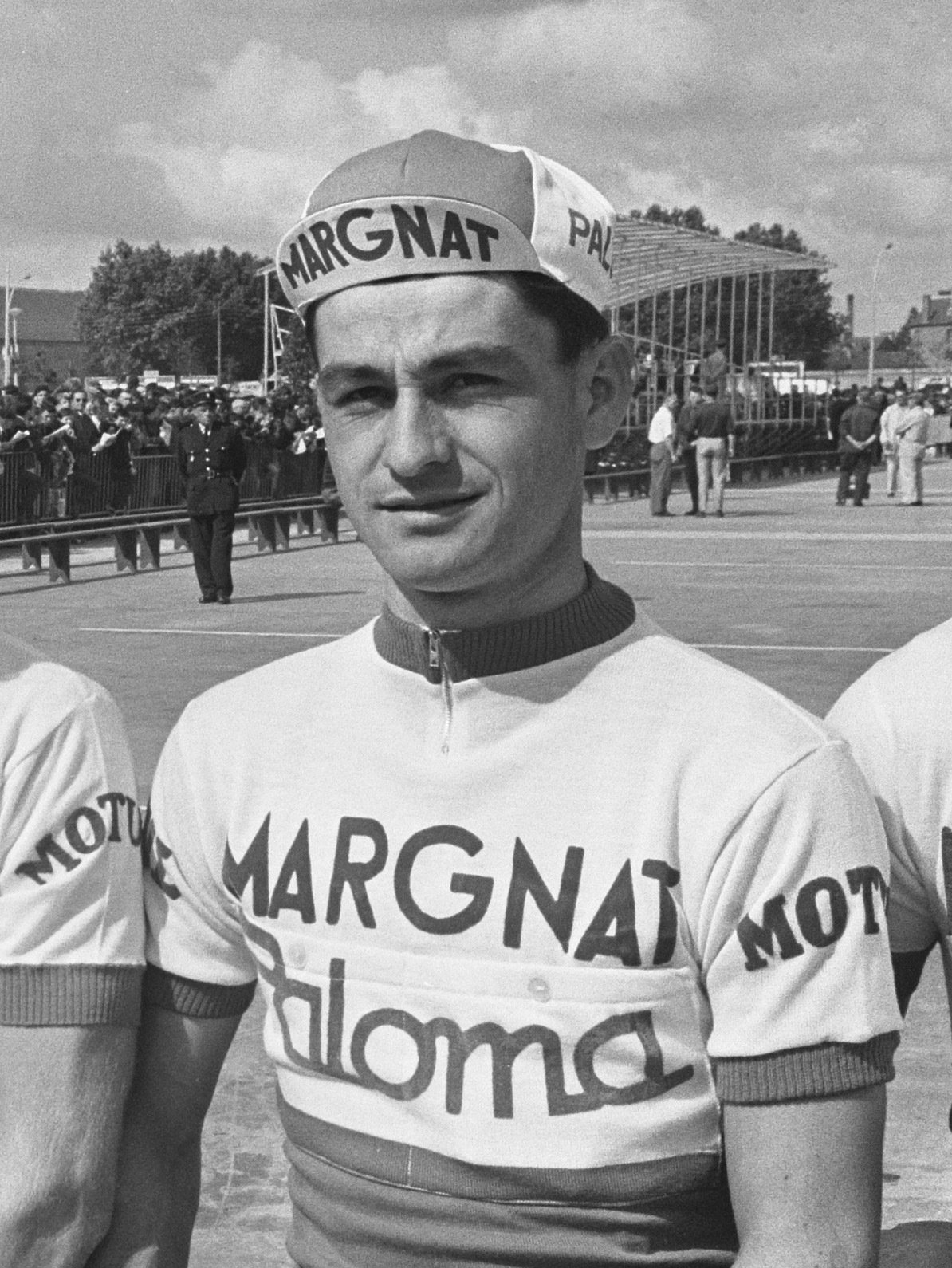
- Gestraud (1964)

Personal information
- Born: 24 September 1939 (age 87) Valenciennes, France

Cycling career
- Sport: Cycling

Jacques Gestraut (born 24 September 1939) is a former French cyclist. He competed in the individual road race at the 1960 Summer Olympics.
