= André Zimmermann =

French cyclist (1939–2019)

Personal information
- Born: 20 February 1939 Maisonsgoutte
- Died: 5 November 2019 (aged 80)

Cycling career
- Sport: Cycling
- Current team: Retired
- Discipline: Road
- Role: Rider
- Rider type: Climber

Professional teams
- 1963-1964: Saint-Raphael - Gypsy
- 1965-1968: Peugeot - BP - Michelin
- 1969: Sonolor - Lejeune

Major wins
- Tour de l'Avenir (1963)

André Zimmermann (20 February 1939 – 5 November 2019) was a French cyclist.

He was the first French rider to win the Tour de l'Avenir. He competed in the Tour de France fives times from 1964 to 1969.

He was on Jacques Anquetil's team when he won his fifth Tour de France in 1964.

== Major results ==
1963
1st Overall Tour de l'Avenir

1st Stages 3 & 9

1st Stage 6 Route de France
1966
1st Grand Prix d'Aix-en-Provence
1967
3rd Bordeaux-Saintes
1968
3rd GP Ouest-France

== Results at the Grand Tours ==
=== Tour de France ===
- 1964: 36th
- 1965: 17th
- 1966: 23rd
- 1967: DNF
- 1969: 26th

=== Giro d'Italia ===
- 1964: 12th
- 1968: DNF

=== Vuelta a España ===
- 1967: 29th
