= Jacques Cadiou =

French cyclist

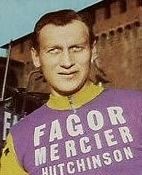
- Cadiou in 1971

Personal information
- Born: 11 December 1943 (age 82) Dourdan, France

Cycling career
- Sport: Cycling
- Discipline: Road
- Role: Rider

Professional teams
- 1965–1966: Pelforth–Sauvage–Lejeune
- 1967: Kamomé–Dilecta
- 1968–1969: Frimatic–Wolber–de Gribaldy
- 1970–1973: Fagor–Mercier–Hutchinson

Jacques Cadiou (born 11 December 1943) is a French former racing cyclist. He rode in the 1967 Tour de France.

== Major results ==
1965
1st Grand Prix d'Aix-en-Provence
1966
4th GP Ouest–France
1968
1st Grand Prix de Cannes
4th Tour du Nord-Ouest
1969
1st GP Monaco
1970
1st Grand Prix de Saint-Raphaël
3rd Overall Tour d'Indre-et-Loire
1971
1st Stage 13b Volta a Portugal
3rd Paris–Camembert
1972
4th Overall Tour d'Indre-et-Loire
1973
9th Bordeaux–Paris
