= Pierre Le Mellec =

French cyclist

Personal information
- Born: 3 August 1940 (age 86) Vannes, France

Cycling career
- Sport: Cycling
- Discipline: Road
- Role: Rider

Professional team
- 1963–1967: Peugeot–BP–Englebert

Pierre Le Mellec (born 3 August 1940) is a French former racing cyclist. He rode in the 1964 Tour de France.

== Major results ==
1963
2nd GP Ouest–France
2nd Circuit de l'Aulne
1964
1st Stage 3b Critérium du Dauphiné Libéré
1965
2nd Côte Normande
3rd Grand Prix d'Aix-en-Provence
1966
3rd GP Ouest–France
