= André Ruffet =

French cyclist

Personal information
- Born: 10 September 1929
- Died: 15 August 2011 (aged 81)

Cycling career
- Sport: Cycling
- Role: Rider

André Ruffet (10 September 1929 – 15 August 2011) was a French racing cyclist. He rode in the 1951 Tour de France.
