= Isaac Vitré =

French cyclist

Personal information
- Born: 23 May 1931 (age 95)

Cycling career
- Sport: Cycling
- Role: Rider

Isaac Vitré (born 23 May 1931) is a French racing cyclist. He rode in the 1955 Tour de France.
