= Joseph Velly =

French cyclist

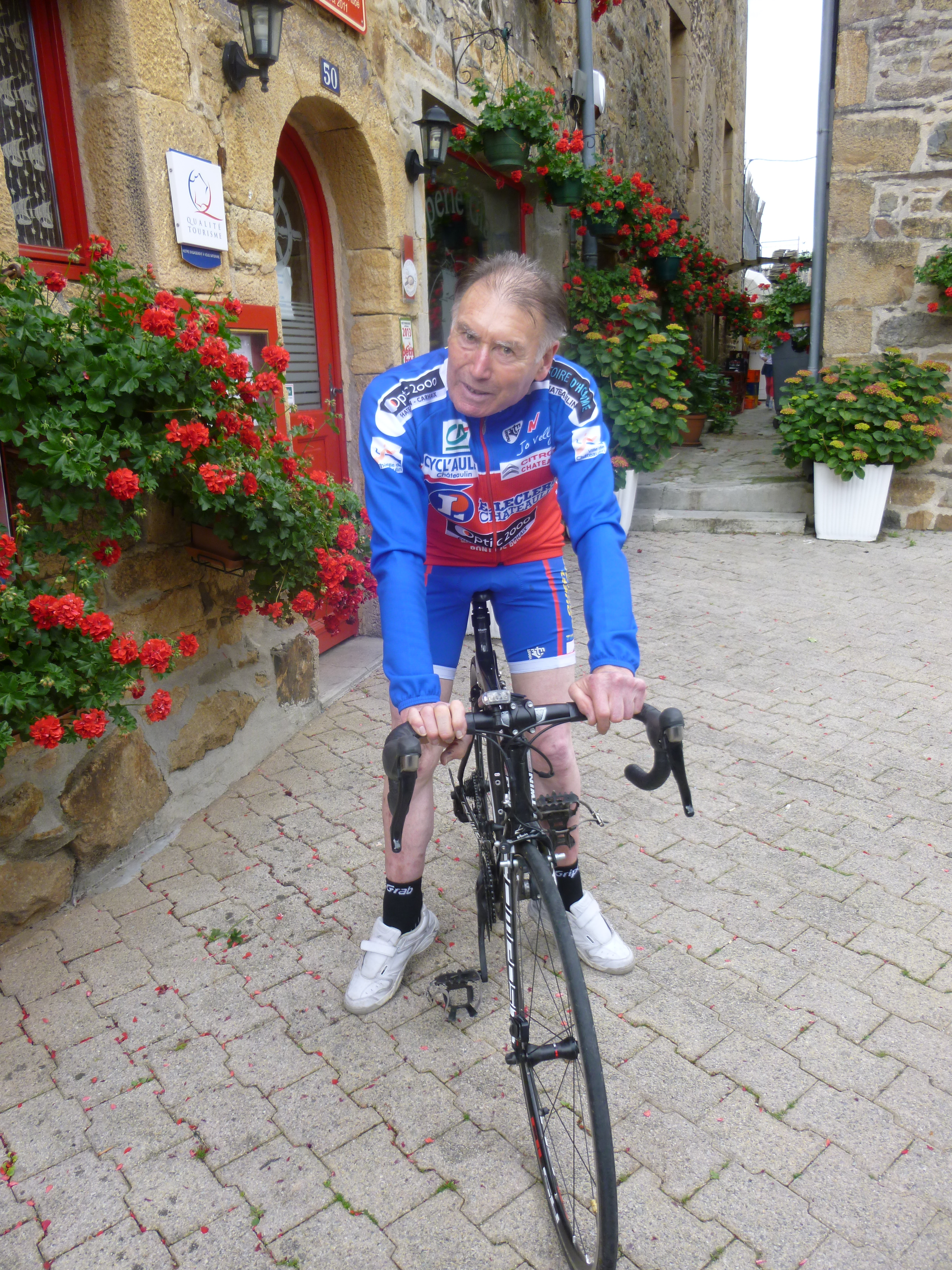

Personal information
- Born: 10 March 1938 Crozon, France
- Died: 29 September 2016 (aged 78)

Cycling career
- Sport: Cycling
- Role: Rider

Joseph Velly (10 March 1938 – 29 September 2016) was a French racing cyclist. He rode in the 1962 Tour de France.
