= Norbert Esnault =

French cyclist

Personal information
- Born: 6 June 1928
- Died: 21 April 2016 (aged 87)

Cycling career
- Sport: Cycling
- Role: Rider

Norbert Esnault (6 June 1928 – 21 April 2016) was a French racing cyclist. He rode in the 1953 Tour de France.
