= Félix Lebuhotel =

French cyclist

Personal information
- Born: 21 July 1932 Saint-Joseph, Manche, France
- Died: 5 November 2008 (aged 76) Ploufragan, France

Cycling career
- Sport: Cycling
- Role: Rider

Félix Lebuhotel (21 July 1932 – 5 November 2008) was a French professional racing cyclist. He rode in three editions of the Tour de France.
