= François Favé =

French cyclist

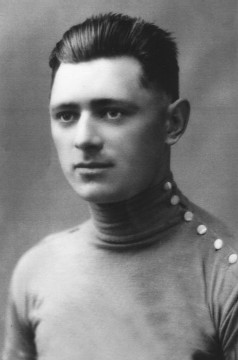

Personal information
- Born: 18 December 1905
- Died: 17 March 1951 (aged 45)

Cycling career
- Sport: Cycling
- Discipline: Road
- Role: Rider

François Favé (18 December 1905 – 17 March 1951) was a French racing cyclist. He rode in the 1928 Tour de France.
