= Jean Jourden =

French cyclist (1942–2024)

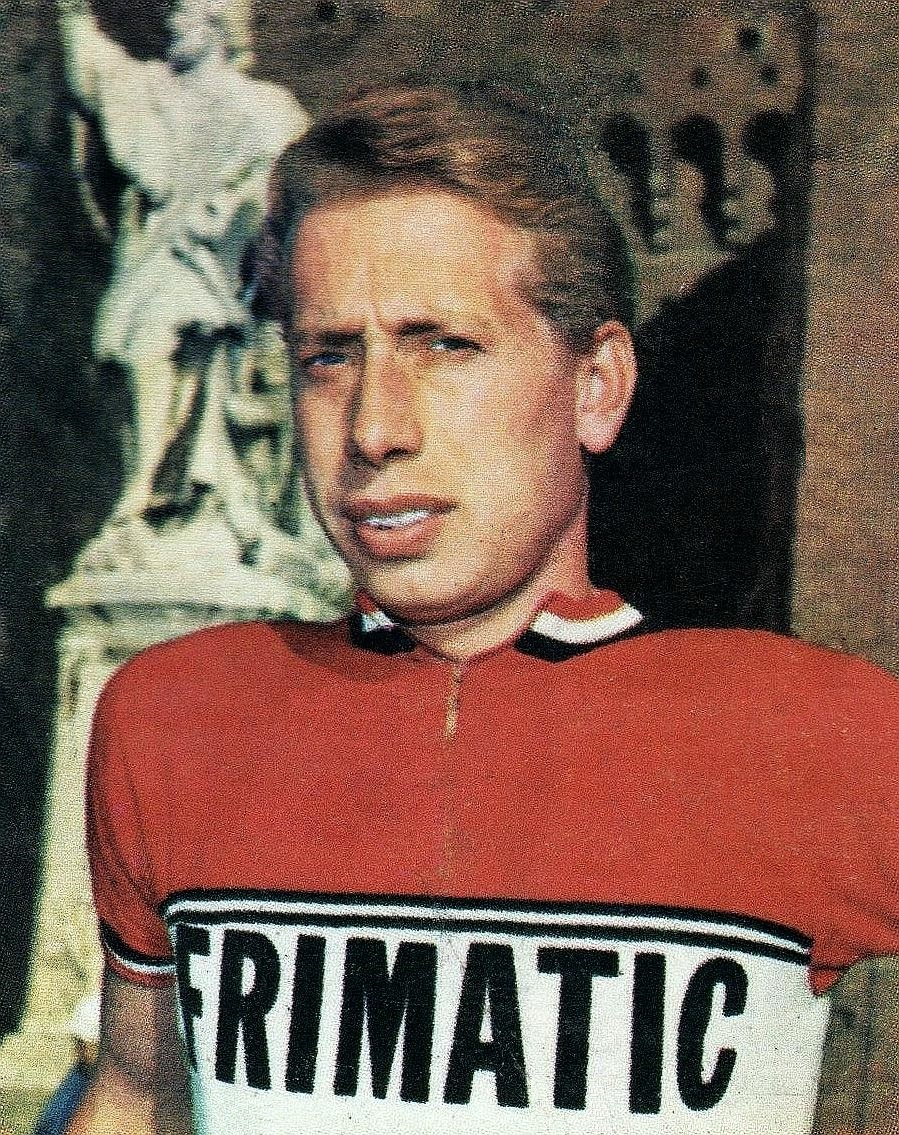
- Jourden, c. 1968

Personal information
- Born: 11 July 1942 Saint-Brieuc, German-occupied France
- Died: 23 November 2024 (aged 82)

Sport
- Sport: Cycling
Medal record
Representing France
World Championships
Gold medal – first place	1961 Bern	Road race

Jean Jourden (11 July 1942 – 23 November 2024) was a French cyclist. As an amateur he won the road race at the 1961 UCI Road World Championships. In 1965 he turned professional and competed until 1972. He won several minor races and rode the Tour de France in 1968 and 1969. His brother Henri was also a cyclist. Jean Jourden died on 23 November 2024, at the age of 82.
