= Hubert Ferrer =

French cyclist

Personal information
- Born: 26 January 1937 (age 89) Algiers, Algeria

Cycling career
- Sport: Cycling
- Role: Rider

Hubert Ferrer (born 26 January 1937) is a French former professional racing cyclist. He rode in four editions of the Tour de France.
