= Jacques Bossis =

French cyclist

Personal information
- Full name: Jacques Bossis
- Born: 22 December 1952 (age 73) Jonzac, France

Cycling career
- Sport: Cycling
- Discipline: Road
- Role: Rider

Major wins
- GP Ouest-France (2x)

Jacques Bossis (born 22 December 1952) is a French former professional road bicycle racer. As an amateur he won Bordeaux-Saintes in 1973. He was professional from 1976 to 1985 and won 7 victories. He wore the yellow jersey as leader of the general classification for one day in the 1978 Tour de France. His victories include 1976 and 1977 editions of the GP Ouest-France, 1981 Tour du Haut-Var. Since 1988 in the commune of Saujon in Charente-Maritime in France, a cycling event called the la Jacques Bossis is organized which counts for the national amateur competition. He also competed in the team pursuit event at the 1972 Summer Olympics.

== Major results ==
1973
Bordeaux-Saintes
1976
GP Ouest-France
1977
GP Ouest-France
1978
Circuit de l'Indre
Cholet-Pays de Loire
France national track pursuit championships
Intermediate sprints classification in the Tour de France
1980
Grand Prix de Fourmies
Nogent-sur-Oise
1981
Plancoët
GP de Peymeinade
Tour du Haut Var
