= Jean Gainche =

French cyclist (1932–2025)

Personal information
- Full name: Jean Gainche
- Born: 12 August 1932 Remungol, France
- Died: 22 December 2025 (aged 93)

Cycling career
- Sport: Cycling
- Discipline: Road
- Role: Rider

Major wins
- 1 stage 1958 Tour de France

Jean Gainche (12 August 1932 – 22 December 2025) was a French professional road bicycle racer. In 1958, Gainche won the 4th stage of the Tour de France.

Gainche died on 22 December 2025, at the age of 93.

== Major results ==
1955
Plumeliau
1958
Carantec
GP Ouest-France
Locmalo
Tour de Champagne
Tour de France:

Winner stage 4

1959
Boucles de l'Aulne
Étoile du Léon
Leuhan
Morlaix
1961
Locmalo
Ronde de Seignelay
Valognes
Château-Chinon
1962
GP Ouest-France
Mi-Août Bretonne
1964
Guerlesquin
Hennebont
Plessala
1965
Lagorce-Laguirande
Pontrieux
1966
Quimper-Guez
