= François Goasduff =

French cyclist

Personal information
- Born: 27 April 1935 (age 91)

Cycling career
- Sport: Cycling
- Role: Rider

François Goasduff (born 27 April 1935) is a French racing cyclist. He rode in the 1962 Tour de France.
