= Georges Groussard =

French cyclist

Personal information
- Full name: Georges Groussard
- Nickname: Le Coq de Fougeres
- Born: 22 March 1937 (age 89) Ille-et-Vilaine, France

Cycling career
- Sport: Cycling
- Current team: Retired
- Discipline: Road
- Role: Rider

Professional teams
- 1960: Helyett
- 1961: Alcyon
- 1962–1967: Pelforth

Major wins
- 9 days in yellow jersey

Georges Groussard (born 22 March 1937) is a retired French road cyclist. Groussard rode professionally from 1960 to 1967. He participated in 7 Tours de France, and wore the yellow jersey for 9 consecutive days in 1964. His best overall result was also in 1964, when he finished 5th place in the overall classification. His elder brother Joseph Groussard was also a professional cyclist.

Since 1995, the race La Georges Groussard is dedicated to him.

== Major results ==
1959
Winner Mican-Morvan (amateur race)
1961
2nd place Paris–Nice
3rd place Tour de Luxembourg
1962
Winner in Plumeliau
1963
Winner in Plumeliau
1964
2nd place in French national road race championship
2nd place in Preslin
2nd place in Sévignac

== Tour de France results ==
- 1961: 30th place
- 1962: 72nd place
- 1963: 51st place
- 1964: 5th place, 10 days in yellow jersey
- 1965: did not finish: gave up in stage 3
- 1966: 30th place
- 1967: Team: France 3 (start number 127), did not finish; out of time on stage 8
