= Jean Bourlès =

French cyclist (1930–2021)

Personal information
- Full name: Jean Bourlès
- Born: 17 August 1930 Pleyber-Christ, France
- Died: 30 March 2021

Cycling career
- Sport: Cycling
- Discipline: Road
- Role: Rider

Major wins
- 1 stage Tour de France

Jean Bourlès (17 August 1930 – 30 March 2021) was a French professional road bicycle racer. He was born in Pleyber-Christ. He was a professional cyclist between 1954 and 1965. He won stage 16 in the 1957 Tour de France.

== Major results ==
1955
Callac
1956
Etoile du Léon
1957
Callac
Ploudalmezeau
Tour de France:

Winner stage 16

1958
Callac
Circuit des genêts verts
Coatserho
Gouesnou
Guimillau
Huelgoat
Loqueffret
Maël-Pestivien
Plougastic
Pont-de-Croix
Saint-Pol-de-Leon
1959
Plougastel
1960
Puteaux
Saint-Eutrope
Plessala, Plessala
1961
Camors
1962
Bothsorel
Camors
Plounevez-Quintin
1963
Mi-Août Bretonne
Plougonver
Plougasnou
Pleine-Fougères
1964
Circuit des genêts verts (with Joseph Thomin)
GP Ouest-France
Huelgoat
Saint-Lormel
1965
Le Faouet
Miniac-Morvan
Quemper-Guézennec
1966
Pleyber-Christ
Présenaye
Tréguier
1967
Plélan-le-Petit
Plemet
Plouëc-du-Trieux
Plouigneau
Saint-Caradec
1968
Plourach
