= Amand Audaire =

French cyclist

Personal information
- Born: 28 September 1924
- Died: 20 December 2013 (aged 89) Saint-Sébastien-sur-Loire, France

Cycling career
- Sport: Cycling
- Role: Rider

Amand Audaire (28 September 1924 – 20 December 2013) was a French professional racing cyclist. He rode in four editions of the Tour de France.
