= François Hamon =

French cyclist

Personal information
- Born: 20 January 1939 (age 87) Guerlesquin, France

Cycling career
- Sport: Cycling

François Hamon (born 20 January 1939) is a French former cyclist. He competed in the individual road race and team time trial events at the 1960 Summer Olympics.
