= Plouay =

Plouay Ploue
- Commune
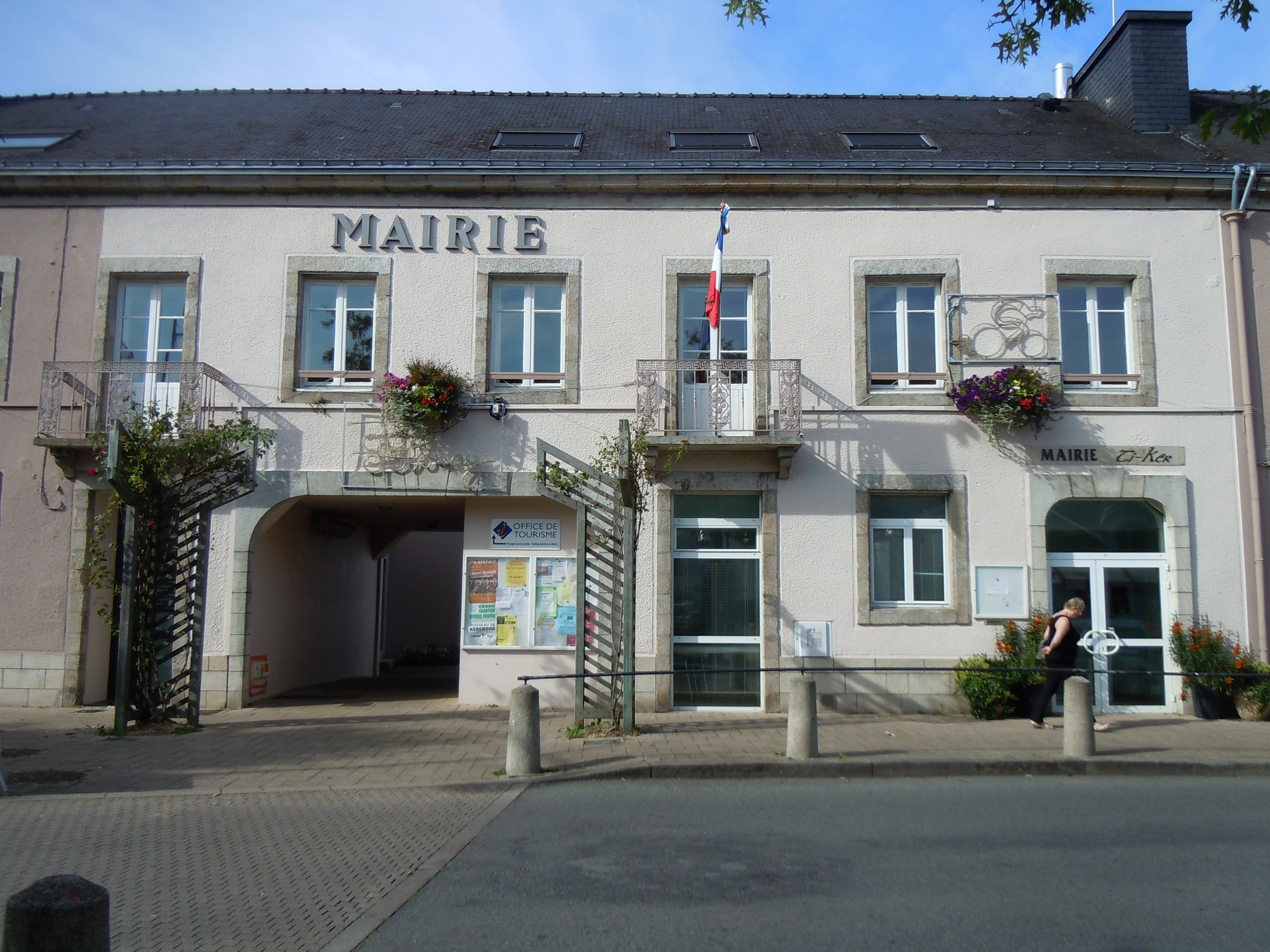
- The town hall in Plouay

- Coat of arms
- Location of Plouay
- Location within France Location within Brittany
- Coordinates: 47°54′56″N 3°20′02″W
- Country: France
- Region: Brittany
- Department: Morbihan
- Arrondissement: Lorient
- Canton: Guidel
- Intercommunality: Lorient Agglomération

Government
  - Mayor (2026–32): Gwenn Le Nay
- Area^{1}: 67.33 km^{2} (26.00 sq mi)
- Elevation: 83 m (272 ft)
- Highest elevation: 164 m (538 ft)
- Lowest elevation: 13 m (43 ft)
- Population (2023): 5,755
  - Density: 85.47/km^{2} (221.4/sq mi)
- Time zone: UTC+01:00 (CET)
  - Summer (DST): UTC+02:00 (CEST)
- INSEE/Postal code: 56166 /56240
- ^{1} French Land Register data, which excludes lakes, ponds, glaciers > 1 km^{2} (0.386 sq mi or 247 acres) and river estuaries.

Plouay (French pronunciation: [pluɛ]; Breton: Ploue) is a commune in the Morbihan department in Brittany in north-western France.

Plouay hosts the GP Ouest-France and the GP de Plouay, annual cycling races (a men's and women's race, respectively). It was also the location of the UCI Road World Championships in 2000. The Tour de France has visited this town three times: in 1998, 2002 and in 2006.

== Population ==
Inhabitants of Plouay or Ploue are called Plouaysiens in French and Plouead (Ploueiz), Ploueadez (-ed) in Breton.

Historical population

Year	Pop.	±% p.a.
1793	3,656	—
1800	3,516	−0.56%
1806	3,602	+0.40%
1821	3,632	+0.06%
1831	3,816	+0.50%
1836	4,210	+1.98%
1841	4,047	−0.79%
1846	4,308	+1.26%
1851	4,362	+0.25%
1856	4,560	+0.89%
1861	4,360	−0.89%
1866	4,281	−0.37%
1872	4,093	−0.75%
1876	4,261	+1.01%
1881	4,526	+1.21%
1886	4,539	+0.06%
1891	4,430	−0.48%
1896	4,572	+0.63%
1901	4,697	+0.54%

Year	Pop.	±% p.a.
1906	4,777	+0.34%
1911	4,820	+0.18%
1921	4,821	+0.00%
1926	4,772	−0.20%
1931	4,590	−0.77%
1936	4,380	−0.93%
1946	5,120	+1.57%
1954	4,112	−2.70%
1962	3,964	−0.46%
1968	3,876	−0.37%
1975	4,053	+0.64%
1982	4,368	+1.07%
1990	4,834	+1.28%
1999	4,759	−0.17%
2007	5,230	+1.19%
2012	5,336	+0.40%
2017	5,670	+1.22%
2023	5,755	+0.25%

Source: EHESS and INSEE (1968–2023)

== Geography ==
Plouay is located in the west of Morbihan, 13 km (8.1 mi) northwest of Hennebont and 18.5 km (11.5 mi) north of Lorient. Historically, it belongs to Vannetais. The river Scorff forms the commune's western border. The area is hilly and forest-covered. Apart from the village centre, there are many hamlets in the commune.

== Map ==
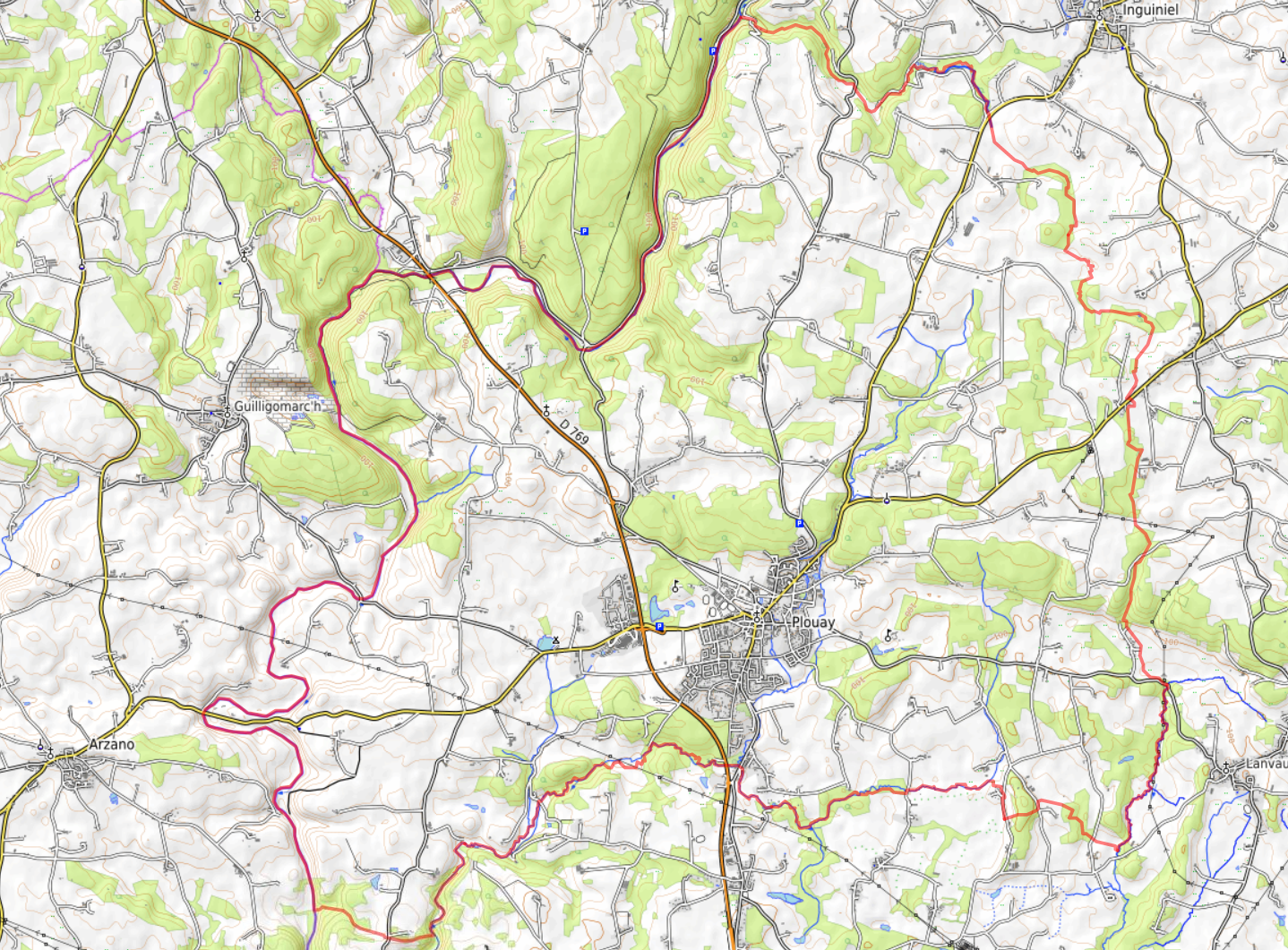
Topographic map.

== List of places ==
- Bécherel
- Bois de Kerlucas
- Château de Kersily
- Château de Manéhouarn
- Coet-Fao
- Coët Neblech
- Coëtulaire
- Cunffio
- Guern (le)
- Gosquer (le)
- Kerallé
- Keramont
- Kerbaloff Le Bourg
- Kerbaloff Le Lage
- Kerdalvé
- Kerdinas
- Kerdrého
- Kerduel
- Kergan
- Kergarenne
- Kergarnic
- Kergo
- Kerguescanff
- Kerguestenen
- Kergussec
- Kerharlay
- Kerhoual
- Kerhouant
- Kerhoazic
- Kerhuennec
- Keriquel
- Kerlagadec
- Kerlidec
- Kerlivio
- Kerlucas
- Kerlutune
- Kermandu
- Kermarrec
- Kermignan
- Kermorgan
- Kermouël
- Kernivinen
- Kernonen
- Kerpont
- Kerprat
- Kerscoulan
- Kerscoulic
- Kerspern
- Kervrehan
- Haut Rostervel (le)
- Lezot (le)
- Lann Justice
- Locmaria Grâce
- Locunel
- Malachappe
- Manébail
- Mané en Du
- Mané Froment
- Mané Guégan
- Mané Henry
- Manerio
- Manetanet
- Moulin à papier du Paou
- Moulin de Coet-Cren
- Moulin de Kerviden
- Moustervat
- Moustoir (le)
- Nezech (le)
- Pen-er-prat
- Penterff
- Paou (le)
- Pont-Allon
- Pont-Neuf
- Pont-Nivino
- Questenen-Plaine
- Restavy
- Restergal
- Rugonan
- Saint-Coff
- Saint-Erven
- Saint-Inifer
- Saint-Quidic
- Stang Nivinen
- Tano (le)
- Toul Er Clanch
- Toulgodo
- Trevenen
- Ty Henry
- Ty Losquet
- Ty Marrec
- Ty Narroz
- Verger (le)
- Vodeste (le)
- Zandec

== History ==
The oldest surviving parish registers date back to 1576. The marquis of Pontcallec had in the seventeenth century in the village of Plouay court, prison, pillory and gallows with four pillars.

== Breton language ==
The municipality launched a linguistic plan through Ya d'ar brezhoneg on 10 February 2006.

In 2008, 11.56% of the children in Plouay attended Breton-French bilingual classes in primary education.

== Gallery ==
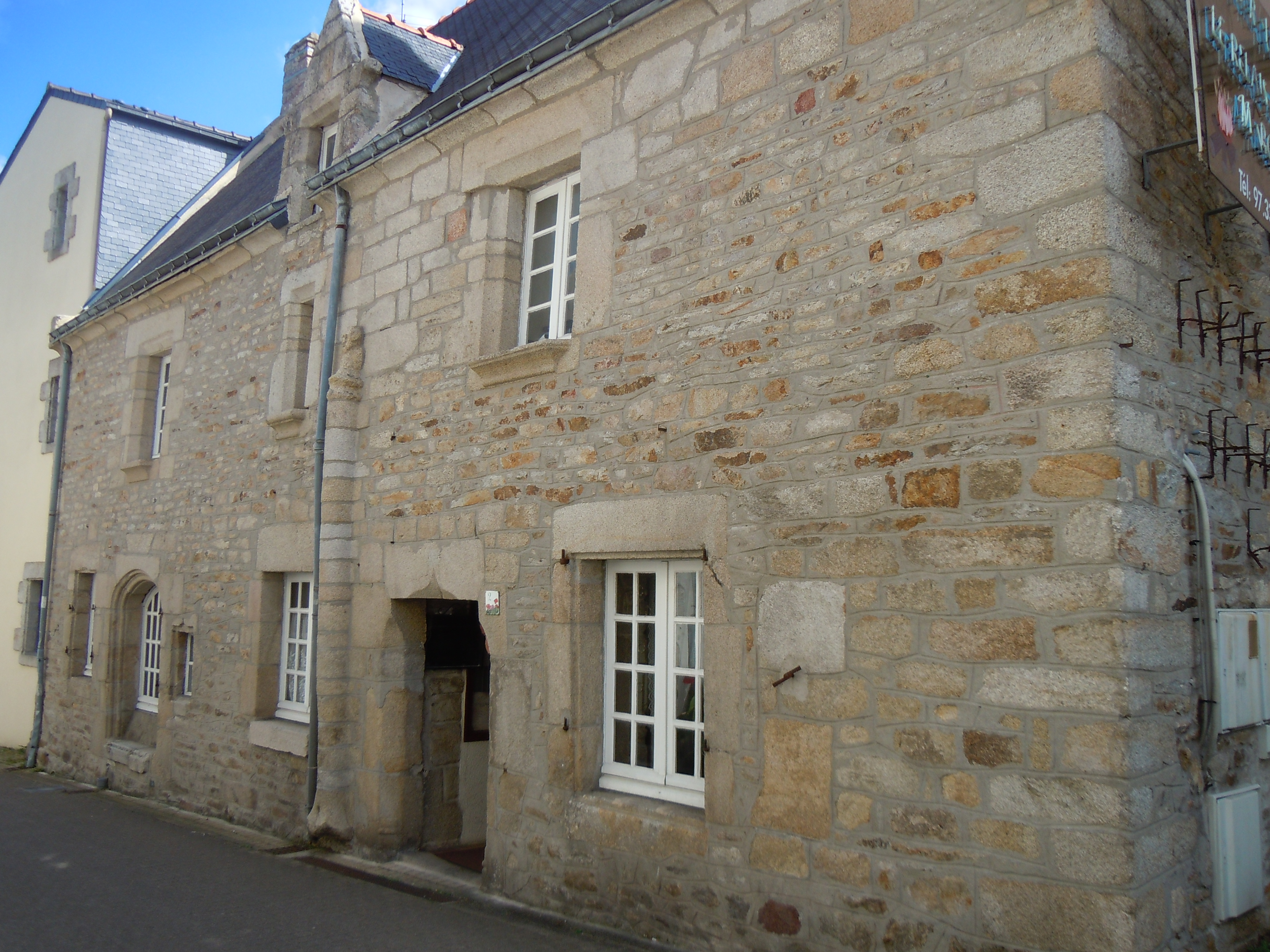
The Marquis's house, maybe the oldest house in the village centre.

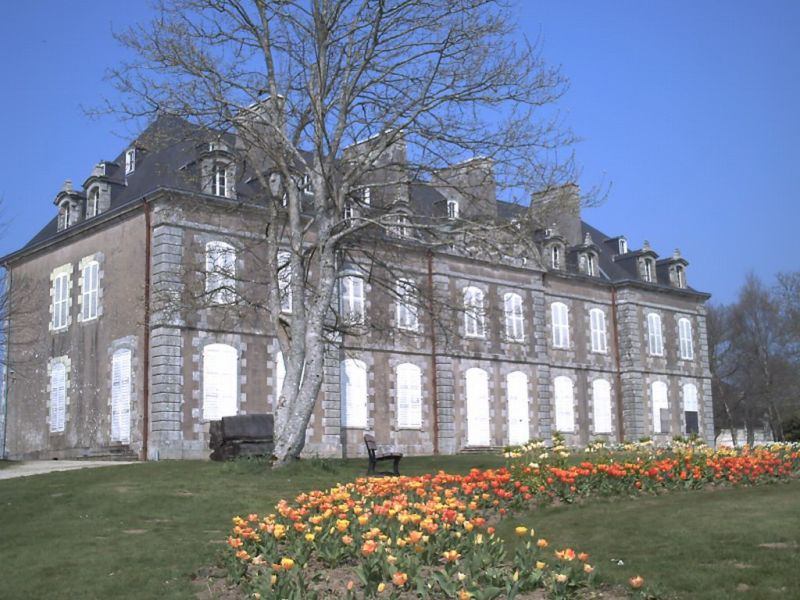
Manehouarn castle.

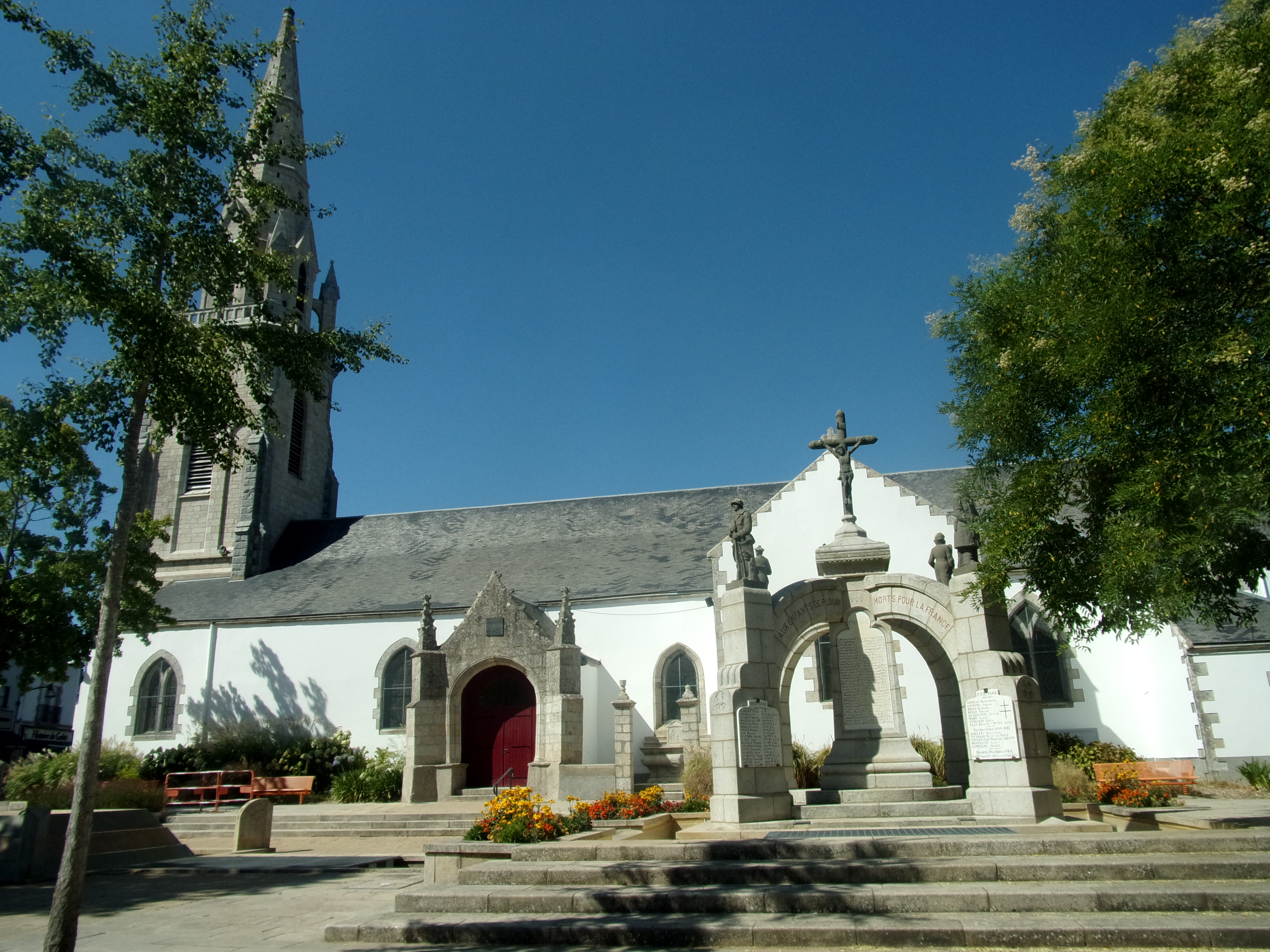
The church of Saint-Ouen.

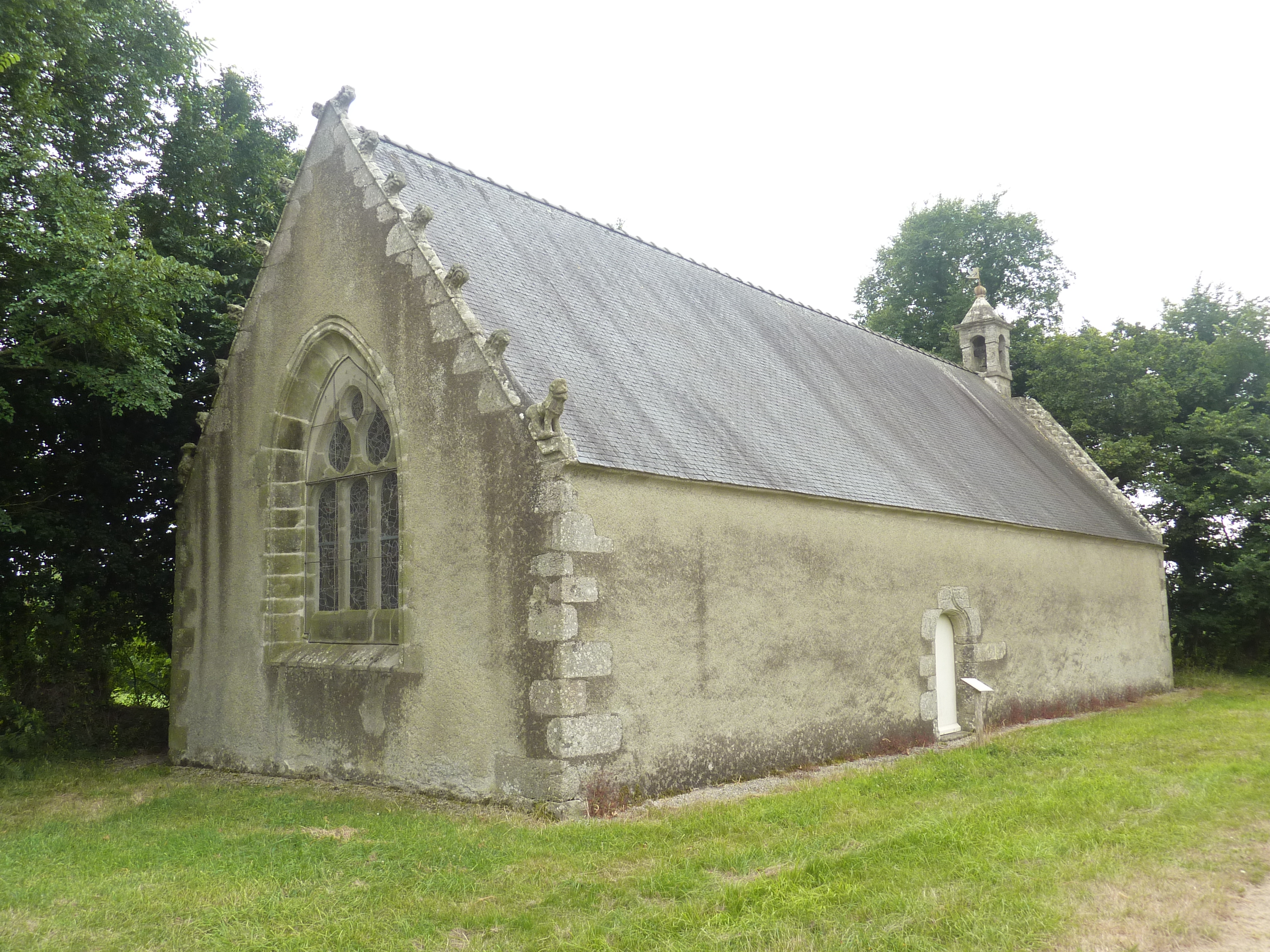
The chapel of Notre-Dame des Grâces.

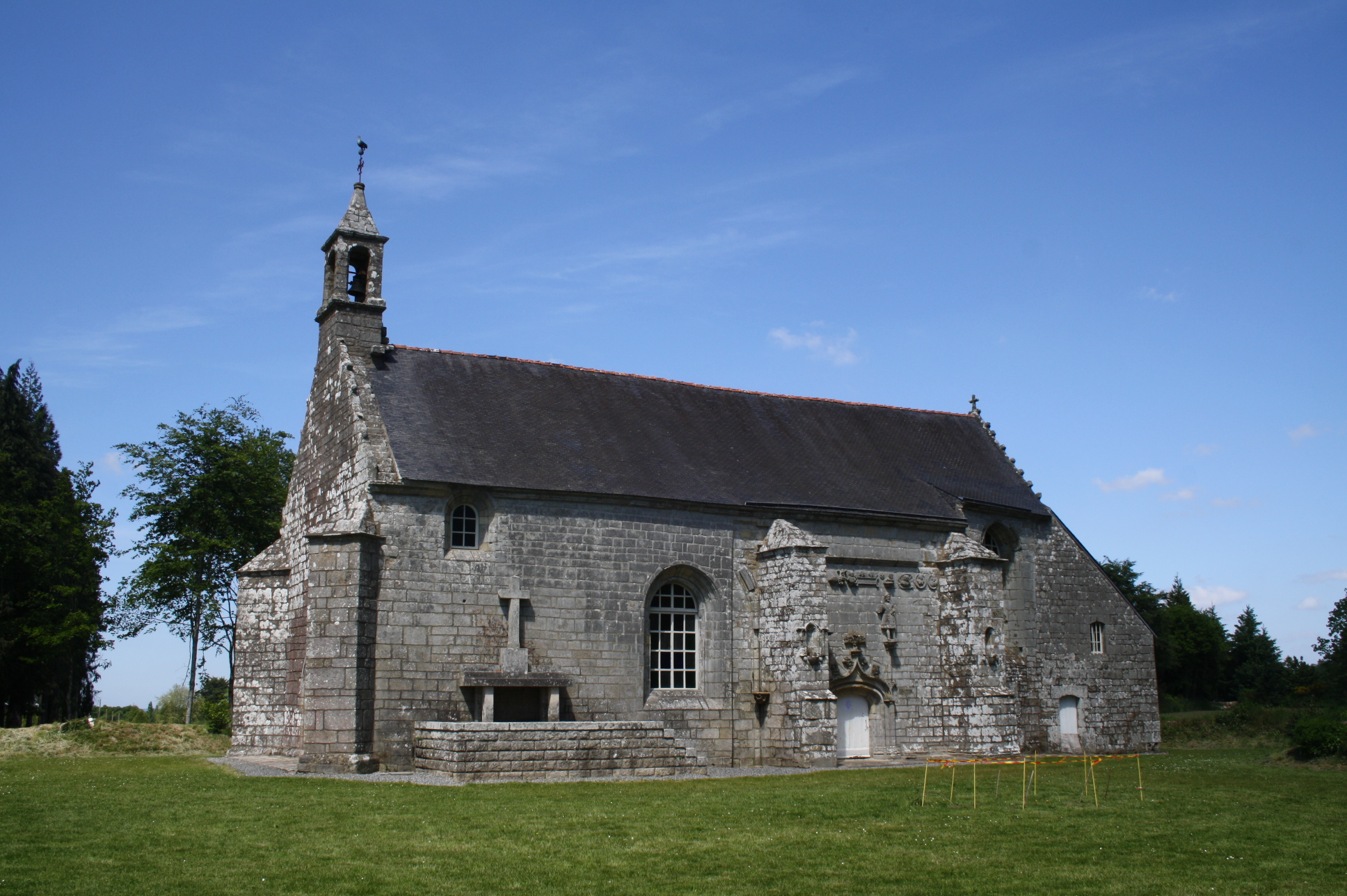
The chapel of Notre-Dame des Fleurs.

== Twin towns ==
Plouay is twinned with Pershore in England.

== See also ==
- Communes of the Morbihan department
