= List of wins by Mercier and its successors =

This is a comprehensive list of victories of the Mercier cycling team.

== 1935 – Mercier–Hutchinson ==
Ligny, Marcel Kint
Paris–Caen, Maurice Archambaud
Jemeppe, Marcel Kint
Stage 13b Giro d'Italia, Maurice Archambaud
Stage 7 Tour de Luxembourg, Marcel Kint
Aalst, Marcel Kint
Stage 5a Tour de France, Maurice Archambaud
Calais Criterium, Marcel Kint
Tour of Flanders, Marcel Kint
Hoegaarden, Marcel Kint
Stage 14b Tour de France, Maurice Archambaud
Zwevegem, Marcel Kint
Koolskamp, Marcel Kint
Paris Six Days, Maurice Archambaud

== 1936 – Mercier–Hutchinson ==
Overall Paris–Nice, Maurice Archambaud

Stage 2, Maurice Archambaud
Stage 7, Pierre Cogan

Overall Tour des Deux Sèvres, Pierre Cogan

Stage 1, Pierre Cogan

Overall Circuit du Morbihan, Cyriel Vanoverberghe

Stage 1, Cyriel Vanoverberghe

Jemeppe, Hubert Muller
Lille, Noël Declercq
Overall Tour of Belgium, Emile Decroix

Stage 2, Marcel Kint
Stage 6, Hubert Muller

Stages 4 & 5 Tour de Luxembourg, Hubert Muller
Kontich, Joseph Somers
Stage 4 Tour de France, Maurice Archambaud
Deurne, Joseph Somers
Stage 19a Tour de France, Marcel Kint
Stage 5 Tour de l'Ouest, Joseph Somers
GP Plouay, Pierre Cogan
Lier, Joseph Somers
Koolskamp, Julien Heernaert

== 1937 – Mercier–Hutchinson ==
Overall Paris–Nice, Roger Lapébie

Stage 1a, René Le Grevès

Critérium International, Roger Lapébie & René Le Grevès
Rollegem, Marcel Kint
Stage 4 Tour of Belgium, Joseph Somers
Overall Paris–Saint-Étienne, Pierre-Marie Cloarec

Stage 2, Roger Lapébie

Bordeaux–Paris, Joseph Somers
Overall Tour de France, Roger Lapébie

Stages 9, 13a, 17c & 18a, Roger Lapébie

Stage 3 Tour du Nord, Noël Declercq
Kortrijk Criterium, Julien Heernaert
Avelgem, Marcel Kint
Thizy, Aldo Bertocco
Grand Prix des Nations, Pierre Cogan
Hennebont, Pierre-Marie Cloarec

== 1938 – Mercier–Hutchinson ==
Overall Paris–Nice, Jules Lowie

Stage 4, René Debenne

Paris–Caen, René Le Grevès
Paris–Brussel, Marcel Kint
Overall Circuit du Morbihan, Pierre-Marie Cloarec

Stage 1, Raymond Louviot

Vilvoorde, Frans Demondt
Stage 4a Tour of Belgium, Joseph Somers
Stage 2 Paris–Saint-Étienne, Jules Lowie
Lier, Joseph Somers
Marchienne-au-Pont, Cyriel Vanoverberghe
Stages 15, 16 & 18 Tour de France, Marcel Kint
Stage 6 Tour de Suisse, Frans Demondt
Marseille–Lyon, Pierre-Marie Cloarec
Overall Clermont-Ferrand, Aldo Bertocco

Stage 2, Aldo Bertocco

Mons, Marcel Kint
Stage 8 Tour de l'Ouest, Pierre-Marie Cloarec
Oudenaarde, Georges Christiaens
GP Plouay, Pierre-Marie Cloarec
UCI World Road Championship, Road Race, Marcel Kint
Hennebont, Pierre-Marie Cloarec

== 1939 – Mercier–Hutchinson ==
Overall Paris–Nice, Maurice Archambaud

Stage 1 Paris–Nice, Roger Lapébie

Paris–Camembert, Pierre-Marie Cloarec
Stage 2 Paris–Saint-Étienne, Lucien Storme
La Flèche Wallonne, Edmond De Lathouwer
France National RoadChampionships, Road Race, Georges Speicher
Circuit des Monts du Roannais, Raymond Louviot
Eigenbilzen, Frans Demondt
Nantes–Les Sables-d'Olonne, Pierre-Marie Cloarec
Stage 2b Tour de France, Éloi Tassin
Stage 3 & 14 Tour de France, Pierre-Marie Cloarec
Stage 4 Tour de France, Raymond Louviot
Stage 6b Tour de France, Edmond Pagès
Stage 8a & 18b Tour de France, Marcel Kint
Stage 10b, 10c, 12b & 17b Tour de France, Maurice Archambaud
Stage 18a Tour de France, René Le Grevès
Sint-Jans-Molenbeek, Marcel Kint
Stage 4 Tour du Nord, Julien Heernaert
Overall Circuit de l'Indre, Éloi Tassin
Belgium National Road Championships, Road Race, Marcel Kint
Marseille–Lyon, Pierre-Marie Cloarec
Zottegem, Marcel Kint
Overall Tour de l'Ouest, Briek Schotte

Stage 3, Georges Speicher

== 1940 – Mercier–Hutchinson ==
Ransart, Briek Schotte
Visé, Marcel Kint
Omloop van België, Marcel Kint
Circuit du Pays Grassois, Dante Gianello
Boom, Frans Demondt

== 1941 – Mercier–Hutchinson ==
Critérium International, Benoît Faure
Avignon–Lyon, Joseph Soffietti
Ambérieu, Fermo Camellini
Saint-Étienne, Benoît Faure
Merelbeke, Briek Schotte
Desselgem, Briek Schotte
Koolskamp, Briek Schotte

== 1942 – Mercier–Hutchinson ==
Critérium International de Cyclo-cross, Robert Oubron
France National Cyclo-cross Championships, Robert Oubron
Tour of Flanders, Briek Schotte
Nice–Mont Agel, Gabriel Ruozzi
Omloop der Vlaamse Gewesten, Odiel Van Den Meerschaut
Stage 2 Tour of Belgium, Odiel Van Den Meerschaut
Montluçon, Robert Dorgebray
Antheit, Odiel Van Den Meerschaut
Circuit de la Haute-Savoie, Fermo Camellini
Desselgem, Briek Schotte
Ougrée, Odiel Van Den Meerschaut
Stage 16 Vuelta a España, Celistino Camilla
Genève, Roger Cottyn
Merelbeke, Odiel Van Den Meerschaut
Stage 2 Clermont-Ferrand, Pierre Cogan
Stage 1 Volta a Catalunya, Celistino Camilla
Grand Prix des Nations, Jean-Marie Goasmat
Stage 8a Volta a Catalunya, Fermo Camellini
Desselgem, Briek Schotte
Gullegem, Marcel Kint
Stage 1 Circuit de France, Guy Lapébie
Stage 3a Circuit de France, Georges Guillier
Stage 6 Circuit de France, Raymond Louviot

== 1943 – Mercier–Hutchinson ==
Critérium International, Louis Gauthier
Paris–Roubaix, Marcel Kint
Tongeren, Marcel Kint
La Flèche Wallonne, Marcel Kint
Montluçon, Gérard Virol
Overall Tour of Belgium, Marcel Kint

Stage 2, Jules Lowie

Scheldewindeke, Odiel Van Den Meerschaut
Brussel–Paris, Marcel Kint
Merelbeke, Jules Lowie
Clermont-Ferrand, Jean-Marie Goasmat

== 1944 – Mercier–Hutchinson ==
Gent, Marcel Kint
Grand Prix du Printemps, Marcel Kint
Nokere, Marcel Kint
La Flèche Wallonne, Marcel Kint
Willebroek, Odiel Van Den Meerschaut
Zingem Criterium, Odiel Van Den Meerschaut

== 1945 – Mercier–Hutchinson ==
Ichtegem, Marcel Kint
Velzeke-Ruddershove, Marcel Kint
Teralfene, Rik Renders
Wingene, Marcel Rijckaert
Bellegem, Marcel Kint
Eke, Marcel Kint
Omloop van België, Marcel Rijckaert
Waregem, André Maelbrancke
La Flèche Wallonne, Marcel Kint
Nederzwalm-Hermelgem, Jules Lowie
Brussels–Ingooigem, Rik Van Steenbergen
Belgium National Road Championships, Road Race, Rik Van Steenbergen
Overall Tour of Belgium, Norbert Callens
Heusden-Zolder, Rik Van Steenbergen
Nieuwerkerken, Rik Van Steenbergen
Aalst, Karel De Baere
Boucles de la Seine St Denis, Louis Gauthier
Brugge, André Maelbrancke
Deinze, André Maelbrancke
Zottegem, Karel De Baere
Dwars door Vlaanderen, Rik Van Steenbergen
Machelen, Norbert Callens
Saint-Étienne, Norbert Callens
Mont-sur-Marchienne, Marcel Kint
Lichtervelde, André Maelbrancke

== 1946 – Mercier–Hutchinson ==
Tour of Flanders, Rik Van Steenbergen
Waregem, Rik Van Steenbergen
Brussels, Rik Van Steenbergen
Lauwe, Marcel Kint
Tour des Quatre-Cantons, Rik Van Steenbergen
Zürich, Rik Van Steenbergen
Pleurtuit, Armand Le Moal
Lyon (i), Roger Chupin
Deinze, Richard Depoorter
Marchienne-au-Pont, Rik Van Steenbergen
Liège–Vichte, Marcel Kint
Ingelmunster, Marcel Kint
Paris–Montceau-les-Mines, Louis Gauthier
Wilrijk Derny, Louis Brusselmans
Overall Omnium de la Route, Richard Depoorter

1st Stages 1a & 1b, Richard Depoorter

Oud-Turnhout, Rik Van Steenbergen
Retie, Rik Van Steenbergen
Meslin-l'Eveque, Marcel Kint
Vichte, Marcel Kint
Quaregnon, Marcel Kint

== 1947 – Mercier–Hutchinson ==
Desselgem, Norbert Callens
Charleroi–Chaudfontaine, Edouard Klabinski
Amiens, Roger Chupin
Stage 1 Tour de la Manche, Guy Butteux
Stage 2 Tour de la Manche, Louis Déprez
Soignies, Rik Van Steenbergen
Knokke-Heist, Marcel Rijckaert
Stage 4 Tour de Luxembourg, Rik Van Steenbergen
Stage 2 GP du Débarquement Nord, Gino Sciardis
Overall Critérium du Dauphiné, Edouard Klabinski

Stage 3a, Gino Sciardis

Handzame, Arthur Mommerency
Stage 16 Tour de France, Pierre Tacca
Stage 20 Tour de Franc, Maurice Diot
Charleroi, Edouard Klabinski
Stage 2 Tour de l'Ouest, Marcel Rijckaert
Lichtervelde, Adolf Verschueren

== 1948 – Mercier–Hutchinson ==
Paris–Roubaix, Rik Van Steenbergen
Liège, Maurice Mollin
Stage 3 Tour of Belgium, Maurice Mollin
Tourcoing, Louis Déprez
Avelgem, Rik Van Steenbergen
Stage 12 Tour de France, Pierre Tacca
Strijpen, Marcel Rijckaert
Stage 20 Tour de France, Bernard Gauthier
Assenede, Rik Van Steenbergen
Steendorp, Adolf Verschueren
Brussel–Moorslede, Marcel Rijckaert
Jumet, Rik Van Steenbergen
Autun, Louis Gauthier
Waremme, Marcel Kint
Handzame, Arthur Mommerency

== 1949 – Mercier–Hutchinson ==
Tongeren, Rik Van Steenbergen
Gent–Wevelgem, Marcel Kint
La Flèche Wallonne, Rik Van Steenbergen
Paris–Camembert, Jean Rey
Paris–Brussel, Maurice Diot
Stage 4 Tour du Maroc, Pierre Tacca
Montluçon, Louis Déprez
Aalst, Georges Desplenter
Ichtegem, Norbert Callens
Hesbaye–Condroz, Joseph Verhaert
Stage 4 Tour de Luxembourg, Gino Sciardis
Stage 2 Paris–Saint-Étienne, Maurice Diot
Stage 1 Critérium du Dauphiné, Gino Sciardis
Stage 2 Tour de la Manche, Louis Déprez
Stage 5b Critérium du Dauphiné, Jean Guéguen
France National Road Championships, Road Race, Jean Rey
Stage 3 Tour de France, Norbert Callens
Stages 12 & 21 Tour de France, Rik Van Steenbergen
Stages 11 & 15b Volta a Portugal, Jean Guéguen
Stage 6 Tour de Suisse, Adolf Verschueren
Chapelle-lez-Herlaimont, Marcel Kint
Barvaux, Rik Van Steenbergen
UCI World Road Championship, Road Race, Rik Van Steenbergen
Charleroi, Rik Van Steenbergen
Charlieu, Émile Baffert
Brussels Six Days, Rik Van Steenbergen & Marcel Kint

== 1950 – Mercier–Hutchinson ==
Belgium National Cyclo-cross Championships, Firmin Van Kerrebroeck
Marseille, Maurice Diot
Wetteren Derny, Adolf Verschueren
Brugge, Georges Desplenter
Steendorp, Karel De Baere
Paris–Brussels, Rik Van Steenbergen
GP de Wallonie, Joseph Verhaert
Liège–Courcelles, Joseph Verhaert
Stage 2 Omnium van de weg, Alois Vansteenkiste
Roeselare, René Janssens
Tournai, Marcel Kint
Stage 1 Paris–Saint-Étienne, Bernard Gauthier
Nantes, Attilio Redolfi
Belgium National Track Championships, Individual Pursuit, Adolf Verschueren
Stage 5b Critérium du Dauphiné, Gino Sciardis
Maldegem, Marcel Rijckaert
Fourmies, Edouard Klabinski
Stage 21 Tour de France, Gino Sciardis
Stage 4 Tour of Belgium, Alois Vansteenkiste
Turnhout, Karel De Baere
Overall Tour de l'Ouest, Attilio Redolfi

Stage 3, Edouard Klabinski
Stage 4, Jean Rey

Halle, Karel De Baere

== 1951 – Mercier–Hutchinson ==
Brugge, Marcel Kint
Paris–Brussel, Jean Guéguen
Sint-Michiels, Leopold Degraeveleyn
Circuit de la Haute-Savoie: Jean Guéguen
Redon, Rik Van Steenbergen
Hoboken, Karel De Baere
Landen, Maurice Mollin
Overall Paris–Saint-Étienne, Attilio Redolfi

Stage 2, Jean Guéguen

Overall Tour de la Manche, Louis Déprez

Stage 1, Louis Déprez

Stages 1 & 15 Giro d'Italia, Rik Van Steenbergen
Bordeaux–Paris, Bernard Gauthier
Heule, Henri Van Kerckhove
Stage 2 Tour de Luxembourg, Alois Vansteenkiste
Stage 1 Critérium du Dauphiné, Attilio Redolfi
Belgium National Track Championships, Individual Pursuit, Adolf Verschueren
Eindhoven, Rene Janssens
Saint-Meen-le-Grand, Rik Van Steenbergen
Overall Tour de l'Ouest, Rik Van Steenbergen

Stages 2 & 4, Rik Van Steenbergen
Stage 5, Roger Chupin
Stage 7, Henri Van Kerckhove

Niel-bij-Sint-Truiden, Rik Van Steenbergen
Turnhout, Rene Janssens
Eke, Marcel Rijckaert
Tongeren, Joseph Verhaert
Maubeuge, Rik Van Steenbergen
Putte-Kapellen, Rene Janssens

== 1952 – Mercier–Hutchinson ==
Belgium National Cycl-cross Championships, Firmin Van Kerrebroeck
Stage 3 Tour of Algeria, Alain Moineau
Stage 5 Tour of Algeria, Jean Guéguen
Paris, Six Days, Rik Van Steenbergen
Marseille, Robert Desbats
Paris–Roubaix, Rik Van Steenbergen
Oostende, Madison: Raphael Glorieux
Stage 4 Tour du Maroc, Louis Déprez
Stage 3a Roma–Napoli–Roma, Rik Van Steenbergen
Overall Tour du Sud-Est, Bernard Gauthier
Kortrijk, Henri Van Kerckhove
Vaux–Poperinge, Henri Van Kerckhove
Rocourt, Madison: Rik Van Steenbergen
Paris–Clermont-Ferrand, Jean Guéguen
Ichtegem, Henri Van Kerckhove
Stage 2 Tour of Belgium, Maurice Mollin
Stages 6, 9 & 10 Giro d'Italia, Rik Van Steenbergen
Meulebeke, Karel De Baere
Nantes, Alain Moineau
Overall Tour of Belgium, Henri Van Kerckhove
Overall Tour de la Manche, Louis Déprez

Stage 1a, Louis Déprez

Stages 4 & 5 Critérium du Dauphiné, Nello Lauredi
Aalst, Marcel Rijckaert
Belgium National Track Championships, Individual Pursuit, Raphael Glorieux
Felletin, Robert Desbats
Stage 1 Tour de France, Rik Van Steenbergen
Paris–Limoges, Nello Lauredi
Stage 3 Tour de France, Nello Lauredi
Seraing, Rik Van Steenbergen
Stages 2 & 4 Tour de l'Ouest, Alois Vansteenkiste
Stage 9 Tour de l'Ouest, Jean Guéguen
Amiens Criterium, Rik Van Steenbergen
Antwerpen, Karel De Baere
Wichelen, Karel De Baere
Sijsele, Karel De Baere
Kruishoutem, Cyclo-cross, Firmin Van Kerrebroeck
Overall Vuelta a la Argentina, Rik Van Steenbergen

1st Stages 1, 8 11, 12 & 13, Rik Van Steenbergen

== 1953 – Mercier–Hutchinson ==
Kuurne–Brussel–Kuurne, Leopold Degraeveleyn
Brugge, Marcel Rijckaert
Critérium International, Robert Desbats
Tour of Flanders, Fred De Bruyne
Paris–Camembert, Jean Guéguen
Handzame, Karel De Baere
Aubenas, Émile Baffert
Plougasnou, Rik Van Steenbergen
Stage 2 Circuit des Six Provinces, Fred De Bruyne
Montlueon, Bernard Gauthier
Pleurtuit, Rik Van Steenbergen
Blanden, Fred De Bruyne
Stage 9 Giro d'Italia, Rik Van Steenbergen
Paris–Montceau-les-Mines, Jean Guéguen
Brussel–Couvin, Henri Van Kerckhove
Aalst, Henri Van Kerckhove
Lede, Henri Van Kerckhove
Belgium National Track Championships, Individual Pursuit, Raphael Glorieux
Belgium National Road Championships, Road Race, Alois Vansteenkiste
Stage 8 Tour de France, Jan Nolten
Stage 13 Tour de France, Nello Lauredi
Roubaix–Huy, Karel De Baere
Lessines, Marcel Rijckaert
Willebroek, Karel De Baere
Mere, Marcel Rijckaert
Lokeren, Rik Van Steenbergen
Nouan-le-Fuzelier, Jean Guéguen
Leuven, Marcel Rijckaert
Watten, Louis Déprez
Tour de Corrèze, Yves Cohen
Zele, Henri Van Kerckhove

== 1954 – Mercier–BP–Hutchinson ==
Oudenaarde, Cyclo-cross, Firmin Van Kerrebroeck
Sint-Maria-Horebeke, Cyclo-cross, Firmin Van Kerrebroeck
Omloop Het Nieuwsblad, Karel De Baere
Overall Paris–Nice, Raymond Impanis

Stage 1, Raoul Rémy
Stage 2, Raymond Impanis

Milano–San Remo, Rik Van Steenbergen
Marseille, Bernard Gauthier
Critérium International, Roger Hassenforder
Tour of Flanders, Raymond Impanis
Paris–Roubaix, Raymond Impanis
Circuit du Morbihan, Jean Guéguen
Paris–Montceau-les-Mines, Jacques Marinelli
Stage 4 Tour de Champagne, Gilbert Scodeller
Stages 5, 16, 17 & 22 Giro d'Italia, Rik Van Steenbergen
Paris–Valenciennes, Gilbert Scodeller
Belgium National Track Championships, Individual Pursuit, Roger Hassenforder
Ertvelde, Fred De Bruyne
Stages 1 & 8 Critérium du Dauphiné, Bernard Gauthier
Belgium National Road Championships, Road Race, Rik Van Steenbergen
Stage 6 Tour de France, Dominique Forlini
Stages 8, 13 & 22 Tour de France, Fred De Bruyne
Stage 15 Tour de France, Dominique Forlini
Stage 5 Tour de l'Ouest, Robert Desbats
Stage 6 Tour de l'Ouest, Roger Hassenforder
Quillan, Dominique Forlini
Keerbergen, Raymond Impanis
Eeklo, Marcel Rijckaert
Lokeren, Karel De Baere
Pluneret, Albert Bouvet
Bordeaux–Paris, Bernard Gauthier
Hamme, Karel De Baere
Berlare, Fred De Bruyne
France National Track Championships, Individual Pursuit, Roger Hassenforder
Paris–Tours, Gilbert Scodeller
Zingem, Cyclo-cross, Firmin Van Kerrebroeck
Brussel/Bruxelles, Six Days, Dominique Forlini
Hombeek, Cyclo-cross, Firmin Van Kerrebroeck
Wortegem, Cyclo-cross, Firmin Van Kerrebroeck
Battel, Cyclo-cross, Firmin Van Kerrebroeck

== 1955 – Mercier–BP–Hutchinson ==
Genova–Nice, René Privat
Brugge, Karel De Baere
Stage 2 Paris–Nice, Bernard Gauthier
Bordeaux–Saintes, Jean Dacquay
Tour of Flanders, Willy Truye
Critérium International, René Privat
Vals-les-Bains, Jean Dacquay
Stage 6 & 7 Tour de Tunisie, Jean Anastasi
Stage 3 Tour du Maroc, Jean Dacquay
Stage 2 Circuit du Morbihan, Isaac Vitré
Stage 2a Dwars door Vlaanderen, Fred De Bruyne
Stage 3b Driedaagse van Antwerpen, Bernard Gauthier
Stage 9b Tour du Maroc, Georges Meunier
Circuit de la Haute-Savoie: Jean Anastasi
Brive-la-Gaillarde, Albert Bouvet
Stage 3 Tour du Sud-Est, Francis Anastasi
Stage 4 Tour du Sud-Est, Fred De Bruyne
Stage 5 Tour du Sud-Est, René Privat
Stage 8 Tour du Sud-Est, Albert Bouvet
Boucles de la Seine St Denis, Albert Bouvet
Circuit de l'Ain, Armand Di Caro
Circuit de l'Indre, René Fournier
Gullegem, Willy Truye
Stage 1 Critérium du Dauphiné, René Privat
Stage 6a Critérium du Dauphiné, Georges Meunier
Stage 8 Critérium du Dauphiné, Bernard Gauthier
Lier, Fred De Bruyne
Stage 1a Tour de la Manche, Francis Pipelin
Nouan-le-Fuzelier, Eugène Telotte
Montsauche, René Fournier
Sete, Raoul Rémy
Stage 7 Tour de l'Ouest, Pierre Gaudot
Welle, Karel De Baere
Montelimar, Raoul Rémy
Plouay, Jean-Jacques Petitjean
Nederbrakel, Fred De Bruyne
Stage 2 Lyon–Montlueon–Lyon, René Privat
Petegem, Karel De Baere
Putte-Kapellen, Karel De Baere

== 1956 – Mercier–BP–Hutchinson ==
Monaco, Valentin Huot
Overall Paris–Nice, Fred De Bruyne

1st Stages 1 & 4b, Fred De Bruyne

Roanne, Robert Ducard
Milano–San Remo, Fred De Bruyne
Roanne, Robert Ducard
Paris–Camembert, René Fournier
Astene, Julien Schepens
Impe, Michel Van Aerde
Zarren, Julien Schepens
Stage 3b Driedaagse van Antwerpen, Willy Truye
Essenbeek, Julien Schepens
Burst, Michel Van Aerde
Chateau-Chinon-Ville, Jean Dacquay
Mont Faron, Valentin Huot
Vougy, Robert Ducard
Lubbeek, Jan Adriaensens
Stage 4a Roma–Napoli–Roma, Bernard Gauthier
Stage 4 Tour de Champagne, Siro Bianchi
Liege, Julien Schepens
Avelgem, Julien Schepens
Liege, Fred De Bruyne
Morlaix, Albert Bouvet
Stage 10a Vuelta a España, Eugène Telotte & Raoul Rémy
Hoboken, Julien Schepens
Overall Quatre Jours de Dunkerque, Jan Adriaensens

Stages 1 & 4, Jan Adriaensens

Bordeaux–Paris, Bernard Gauthier
Stage 1 Critérium du Dauphiné, Jacques Dupont
Brussels–Liege, Julien Schepens
Stage 3 Critérium du Dauphiné, Fernand Picot
Denderleeuw, Martin Van Geneugden
Machelen, Henri Van Kerckhove
Drieslinter, Roger Baens
Anzegem, Julien Schepens
France National Road Championships, Road Race, Bernard Gauthier
Stages 2 & 6 Tour de France, Fred De Bruyne
Belgium National Road Championships, Road Race, Julien Schepens
Stage 10 Tour de France, Fred De Bruyne
Poix-du-Nord, Pierre Pardo‘n
Tervuren–Breendonk, Roger Baens
Strijpen, René Van Meenen
Montigny-en-Gohelle, Bernard Gauthier
Aalst Criterium, Fred De Bruyne
Felletin, Pierre Beuffeuil
Overall Tour de l'Ouest, Francis Pipelin

Stage 2, Albert Bouvet
Stage 5, Robert Desbats

Jeuk, Roger Baens
Londerzeel, Jan Adriaensens
Ruiselede, Julien Schepens
Taule, Francis Pipelin
Zutendaal, Martin Van Geneugden
Plouay, Valentin Huot
Rummen, Roger Baens
Eke, Michel Van Aerde
Schoonaarde, Michel Van Aerde
Zwijnaarde, Julien Schepens
Vichte, Jan Adriaensens
Paris–Tours, Albert Bouvet
Overall Desgrange-Colombo, Fred De Bruyne

== 1957 – Mercier–BP–Hutchinson ==
Genova–Nice, Louison Bobet
Stage 2 Paris–Nice, Julien Schepens
Stage 5b Paris–Nice, Andre Ruffet
Hoegaarden, Martin Van Geneugden
Geneve, Roger Baudechon
Stage 1b Tour de Champagne, Jacques Bianco
Stage 2 Tour de Champagne, Jacques Bianco
Stage 3 Tour de Champagne, Jean Bellay
Mont Faron Chrono, Valentin Huot
Morlaix, René Fournier
Stages 1 & 3 Quatre Jours de Dunkerque, Julien Schepens
Overall Tour de Champagne, Jacques Bianco
Circuit de la Haute-Savoie: Jean Bellay
Stage 1 Tour de l'Aude, Isaac Vitré
Overall Tour de Normandie, Pierre Gouget

Stage 4, Michel Van Aerde

Raversijde, Gilbert Saelens
Stage 1 Bourges, Francis Anastasi
Verlaine, Roger Baudechon
Brussel–Bever, Roger Baudechon
Stage 5 Tour du Sud-Est, Mohamed Ben Brahimi
Nantes, Isaac Vitré
Stage 1 Eisden, Julien Schepens
Sint-Pieters-Woluwe, Roger Baudechon
Bordeaux–Paris, Bernard Gauthier
Overall Eisden, Michel Van Aerde
Stage 15 Giro d'Italia, Louison Bobet
Blanden, Roger Baudechon
Stage 1 Critérium du Dauphiné, René Privat
Schepdaal, Roger Baudechon
Geneve, Roger Baudechon
Stages 3a & 5 Critérium du Dauphiné, Michel Van Aerde
Stages 3b & 9 Critérium du Dauphiné, Fernand Picot
Sint-Genesius-Rode, Roger Baudechon
Knokke-Heist, Willy Truye
Hanret Criterium, Martin Van Geneugden
France National Road Championships, Road Race, Valentin Huot
Ollignies, Roger Baudechon
Stages 2, 3a, 11 & 15a Tour de France, René Privat
Charleroi, Louison Bobet
La Chatre, Louison Bobet
Tienen, Martin Van Geneugden
Barsac, Raoul Rémy
Temse, Roger Baudechon
Sallanches, Louison Bobet
Deerlijk, Roger Baudechon
Overall Tour de l'Ouest, Pierre Gouget

Stages 1 & 8, Julien Schepens
Stages 3 & 5, Willy Truye
Stage 4 Tour de l'Ouest, Michel Van Aerde

Braine-l'Alleud, Amateurs: Roger Baudechon
Dunkerque, Willy Truye
Felletin, Marcel Queheille
Guemene, Andre Ruffet
Lessines, Roger Baudechon
Grand-Bourg, Marcel Queheille
Laken, Roger Baudechon
Mere, Gilbert Saelens
Chateauneuf-du-Faou, Francis Pipelin
Scaar, Francis Pipelin
Plouay, Isaac Vitré
Antwerpen, Karel De Baere
Thizy, Stephane Klimek
Erpe, Michel Van Aerde
Beernem Criterium, Julien Schepens
Overall Circuit d'Aquitaine, Rene Abadie

Stages 1 & 2, Rene Abadie

Lembeek, Roger Baudechon
Brive-la-Gaillarde, Louison Bobet
Plougonver, René Fournier
Hennebont, Fernand Picot
Gourin, Fernand Picot

== 1958 – Mercier–BP–Hutchinson ==
Stage 6 Paris–Nice, Fernand Picot
Plo‘rmel, Francis Pipelin
Overall Tour du Haut Var, René Privat

Stage 1, René Privat

Stage 1a Driedaagse van Antwerpen, Karel De Baere
Impe, Frans Aerenhouts
Wervik, Marcel Ongenae
Eijsden, Martin Van Geneugden
Stage 1 Tour de Romandie, Tino Sabbadini
Stage 3a Tour de Romandie, Jean Bellay
Raversijde, Marcel Ongenae
Overall Tour du Sud-Est, Bernard Gauthier
Stage 1 Tour de Picardie, Jean Bellay
Overall GP du Midi-Libre, Francis Pipelin

Stage 1, Tino Sabbadini
Stage 3a, Francis Pipelin

Overall Tour de Champagne, Jean Gainche

Stage 2, Mohamed Ben Brahimi
Stage 3, Joseph Bianco
Stage 4, Jean Gainche

Mountains classification Critérium du Dauphiné, Francis Pipelin

Stage 1, Francis Pipelin
Stage 7b, Robert Cazala

Stage 1 Omloop van het Westen, Frans Aerenhouts
Lier, Martin Van Geneugden
France National Road Championships, Road Race, Valentin Huot
Sint-Niklaas Criterium, Karel De Baere
Stage 4 Tour de France, Jean Gainche
Stage 5 Tour de France, Tino Sabbadini
Stages 6 & 12 Tour de France, Martin Van Geneugden
Gistel, Karel De Baere
Bavikhove, Willy Truye
Salignac, René Privat
Beervelde, Michel Van Aerde
Stage 3 Tour de l'Ouest, Frans Aerenhouts
Lessines, Georges Jomaux
Grenade-sur-Garonne, Jacques Sabathier
Wervik, Michel Van Aerde
Plouay, Jean Gainche
Leuven, Karel De Baere
Charleroi, Frans Aerenhouts
Overall Circuit d'Aquitaine, Willy Truye

Stage 1, Willy Truye

Gap, Tino Sabbadini
Overall Tour du Nord, Willy Truye
Stage 1, Willy Truye
Hoegaarden, Frans Aerenhouts
Putte-Kapellen, Karel De Baere

== 1959 – Mercier–BP–Hutchinson ==
Tongeren, Valere Paulissen
Bonnat, Tino Sabbadini
Brussels, Valere Paulissen
Plougasnou, Albert Bouvet
Overall Tour du Sud-Est, René Privat
Valentigney, René Privat
Overall Roma–Napoli–Roma, Louison Bobet

Stages 1, 2, 3, 5b & 9, Louison Bobet

Stages 2 & 4 Tour de Romandie, Albert Bouvet
Stage 2 GP du Midi-Libre, Fernand Picot
Stage 3b GP du Midi-Libre, Robert Cazala
Bordeaux–Paris, Louison Bobet
Fréjus, Louison Bobet
Meulebeke, Frans Aerenhouts
Stage 3 Critérium du Dauphiné, Marcel Queheille
Overall Tour de Champagne, Robert Cazala

Stages 3 & 5 Tour de France, Robert Cazala
Stage 9 Tour de France, Marcel Queheille

Rillaar, Valere Paulissen
Bavikhove, Willy Truye
Plessala, Fernand Picot
Stage 6 Tour de l'Ouest, Joseph Wasko
Ussel, Fernand Picot
Castillon-la-Bataille Criterium, Andre Trochut
Montelimar, René Privat
Ruiselede, Willy Truye
Taule, Félix Lebuhotel
Sint-Amands, Frans Aerenhouts
Quimperle, Francis Pipelin

== 1960 – Mercier–BP–Hutchinson ==
Alger, Robert Cazala
Harelbeke, Willy Vanden Berghen
Hoegaarden, Theo Perpet
Tour of Flanders, Willy Vanden Berghen
Milano–San Remo, René Privat
Gooik, Theo Perpet
Brussels–Tielt, Willy Vanden Berghen
Deerlijk, Richard Everaerts
Tour of Flanders, Richard Everaerts
Bauge, Willy Vanden Berghen
Genappe, Willy Vanden Berghen
Gent–Wevelgem, Frans Aerenhouts
Bonnat, Raymond Poulidor
Rillaar, Theo Perpet
Brussels, Theo Perpet
Bothsorel, Francis Pipelin
Sint-Katelijne-Waver, Theo Perpet
Drieslinter, Theo Perpet
Houthalen, John Van Tongerloo
Borchtlombeek, Theo Perpet
Overall Tour de Champagne, Robert Cazala

Stage 2, Robert Cazala

Sint-Joris-Winge, Theo Perpet
Stage 1b Tour de l'Aude, Raymond Batan
Stage 2 Quatre Jours de Dunkerque, Tino Sabbadini
Stage 12a Zivod M’ru, Willy Vanden Berghen
Grimbergen, Theo Perpet
Mortsel, Amateurs: Theo Perpet
Stage 2 Tour of Belgium, Jozef Schils
Overall GP du Midi-Libre, Valentin Huot

Stage 1, Valentin Huot
Stage 2, Robert Cazala

Lembeek, Amateurs: Theo Perpet
Stage 4b Tour of Belgium, Jozef Schils
Stage 6 Critérium du Dauphiné, Robert Cazala
Overall Driedaagse van West-Vlaanderen, Richard Everaerts
Soignies, Jozef Schils
Beigem, Willy Vanden Berghen
Dilbeek, Theo Perpet
Braine-l'Alleud, Jozef Schils
Stage 2 Tour de France, René Privat
Hemiksem, John Van Tongerloo
Bekkevoort, Theo Perpet
Perk, Willy Vanden Berghen
Stage 1Circuit d'Aquitaine, Robert Verdeun
Stage 20 Tour de France, Pierre Beuffeuil
Rotselaar, Willy Vanden Berghen
Strijpen, Jozef Schils
Stage 1 Grande Premio Vilar, Jean Dacquay
Callac, Francis Pipelin
Arendonk Derny, Frans Aerenhouts
Sint-Genesius-Rode, Theo Perpet
Plessala, Jean Bourlès
Zottegem, Richard Everaerts
Strombeek-Bever, Willy Vanden Berghen
Booischot, Willy Vanden Berghen
Rillaar, Richard Everaerts
Auvelais, Jozef Schils
Arcachon, Raymond Poulidor
Haasrode, Theo Perpet
Zottegem, Jozef Schils
Merchtem, Theo Perpet
Kaprijke, Richard Everaerts
Zellik, Jozef Schils
Tienen, Theo Perpet
Stage 4 Tour du Nord, Jozef Schils
Braine-le-Comte, Willy Vanden Berghen
Kapelle-op-den-Bos, Theo Perpet
Kumtich, Jozef Schils
Waarschoot, Willy Vanden Berghen
Petegem, Theo Perpet

== 1961 – Mercier–BP–Hutchinson ==
Genova–Nice, Fernand Picot
Paris Cyclo-cross, Maurice Gandolfo
Brussels–Zepperen, Alfons Hellemans
Hoegaarden, Jozef Schils
Stage 5 Paris–Nice, Jean Anastasi
Brussels–Oetingen, Alfons Hellemans
Milano–San Remo, Raymond Poulidor
Antwerpen–Wevelgem, Frans Aerenhouts
Gent–Wevelgem, Frans Aerenhouts
Mont Faron, Chrono, Raymond Poulidor
Overall Tour du Haut Var, Robert Cazala
Stage 2 GP du Midi-Libre, Robert Cazala
Plougasnou, Édouard Bihouée
Sint-Lievens-Esse, Jozef Schils
Stage 4 Tour de Champagne, Joseph Wasko
Bonheiden, Alfons Hellemans
Stage 2 Tour de l'Aude, Arnaud Geyre
Evergem, Willy Vanden Berghen
Stage 4 GP du Midi-Libre, Robert Cazala
Bierbeek, Jozef Schils
Stage 1 Weekend Wallon, Willy Vanden Berghen
Buggenhout, Alfons Hellemans
France National Road Championships, Road Race, Raymond Poulidor
Beigem, Alfons Hellemans
Douglas, Alfons Hellemans
Boortmeerbeek, Alfons Hellemans
Stage 21 Tour de France, Robert Cazala
Sint-Katelijne-Waver, Alfons Hellemans
Overall Fourmies, Joseph Wasko
Lalinde, Robert Cazala
Chateau-Chinon Criterium, Jean Gainche
Jambes, Willy Vanden Berghen
Sint-Katelijne-Waver, Alfons Hellemans
Quillan, Pierre Beuffeuil
Brussels–Evere, Willy Vanden Berghen
Pluneret, Francis Pipelin
Plouay, Fernand Picot
Lyon, Manuel Manzano
Hennebont, Jean Bourlès
Langemark, Jozef Schils

== 1962 – Mercier–BP–Hutchinson ==
Monaco, Manuel Manzano
Nice–Mont Agel, Manuel Manzano
Stage 3b Paris–Nice, Willy Vanden Berghen
Tour of Flanders, Alfons Hellemans
Kortrijk–Galmaarden, Frans Melckenbeeck
Roeselare, Frans Aerenhouts
Redon, Félix Lebuhotel
Gaver, Frans Melckenbeeck
Stage 4 Quatre Jours de Dunkerque, Frans Melckenbeeck
Stage 2 Tour de l'Aude, Manuel Manzano
Brussels–Nandrin, Victor Van Schil
Aalst, Frans Melckenbeeck
Cras-Avernas, Jozef Schils
Stage 1 Tour de Luxembourg, Frans Melckenbeeck
Willebroek, Frans Aerenhouts
Bornem, Frans Aerenhouts
Machelen, Willy Vanden Berghen
Stage 4 Tour de France, Willy Vanden Berghen
Stages 6 & 12 Tour de France, Robert Cazala
Plemet, Francis Pipelin
Stage 19 Tour de France, Raymond Poulidor
Sint-Lambrechts-Woluwe, Willy Vanden Berghen
Seignelay, Robert Cazala
Mol, Frans Melckenbeeck
Plessala, Édouard Bihouée
Zottegem, Jozef Schils
Mere, Frans Melckenbeeck
Plouay, Jean Gainche
Lede, Frans Melckenbeeck
Zele, Frans Melckenbeeck

== 1963 – Mercier–BP–Hutchinson ==
Eizer-Overijse, Cyclo-cross, Maurice Gandolfo
Mountains classification Paris–Nice, Raymond Poulidor
Stage 1 Critérium International, Raymond Poulidor
Brest, Hubert Ferrer
Tour of Flanders, August Verhaegen
Roeselare, Frans Melckenbeeck
Eizer-Overijse, Victor Van Schil
Stage 2 Tour du Sud-Est, Frans Melckenbeeck
Morlaix, Jean Bourlès
Tredion, Manuel Manzano
Hoboken, Frans Melckenbeeck
Plougasnou, Jean Bourlès
Liege, Frans Melckenbeeck
La Fleche Wallonne, Raymond Poulidor
Stage 5a Quatre Jours de Dunkerque, Frans Melckenbeeck
Plouigneau, Franeois Le Bihan
Ninove, Frans Melckenbeeck
Belgium National Track Championships, Individual Sprint, Jos De Bakker
Road Championship of Flanders, Road Race, August Verhaegen
Stage 6 Tour de Suisse, Freddy Eugen
Stage 4 Tour de France, Frans Melckenbeeck
Tienen, Willy Vanden Berghen
Melle, Frans Melckenbeeck
Eymoutiers, Robert Cazala
Aalst Criterium, Frans Melckenbeeck
Limoges, Raymond Poulidor
Stage 2 Paris–Luxembourg, Raymond Poulidor
Ussel, Raymond Poulidor
Pleine-Fougères, Jean Bourlès
Port-Brillet, Franeois Le Bihan
Merksem, Victor Van Schil
Kortemark, Frans Melckenbeeck
Grand Prix des Nations, Raymond Poulidor
Hennebont, Franeois Le Bihan
Petegem, Willy Vanden Berghen
Commentry, Claude Mazeaud
Lugano Chrono, Raymond Poulidor

== 1964 – Mercier–BP–Hutchinson ==
Omloop Het Nieuwsblad, Frans Melckenbeeck
Stage 4 Paris–Nice, Frans Melckenbeeck
Stage 7 Paris–Nice, Raymond Poulidor
Stages 5 & 9 Tour de Tunisie, Paul Lemeteyer
Roeselare, Frans Melckenbeeck
Overall Critérium International, Raymond Poulidor

Stage 3, Raymond Poulidor

Overall Tour du Sud-Est, Jean-Claude Annaert
Sevignac, André Le Dissez
Nokere, Robert De Middeleir
Overall Circuit de Lorraine, Jean-Pierre Magnien

Stage 4a, Jean-Pierre Magnien

Merelbeke, August Verhaegen
Overall Vuelta a España, Raymond Poulidor

Stages 3, 6 & 17, Frans Melckenbeeck
Stage 11, Victor Van Schil
Stages 12 & 13, Barry Hoban
Stage 15, Raymond Poulidor

Landen, Alfons Hellemans
Walshoutem, Alfons Hellemans
Stage 1 GP du Midi-Libre, Robert Cazala
Stage 3 GP du Midi-Libre, Barry Hoban
Stages 2 & 4a Critérium du Dauphiné, Raymond Poulidor
Lier, Victor Van Schil
Boucles de la Seine St Denis, Jean Anastasi
Kontich, August Verhaegen
Stage 15 Tour de France, Raymond Poulidor
Temse, Frans Melckenbeeck
Mechelen, Victor Van Schil
Plessala, Jean Gainche
Plemet, Jean Marcarini
Zwevegem, Frans Melckenbeeck
Stage 2b Circuit du Morbihan, Jean Marcarini
Herenthout, Alfons Hellemans
Felletin, Raymond Poulidor
Lede, Frans Melckenbeeck
Kortemark, Frans Melckenbeeck
Hoegaarden, Victor Van Schil
Hennebont, Jean Gainche
Fourmies, Frans Melckenbeeck
Pernod–Super Prestige, Raymond Poulidor

== 1965 – Mercier–BP–Hutchinson ==
Berlin Cyclo-cross, Rolf Wolfshohl
Maze Cyclo-cross, Rolf Wolfshohl
Germany National Cyclo-cross Championship, Rolf Wolfshohl
France National Cyclo-cross Championship, Pierre Bernet
Conflans-Sainte-Honorine Cyclo-cross, Rolf Wolfshohl
Binningen Cyclo-cross, Rolf Wolfshohl
Stage 8 Paris–Nice, Joseph Spruyt
Wevelgem, Andre Meriaux
Harelbeke, Joseph Spruyt
Stage 1 Critérium International, Jean-Claude Annaert
Stage 2 Critérium International, Raymond Poulidor
Torhout, Roger Swerts
Tour of Flanders, Roger Swerts
Sainte-Alvere, Robert Cazala
Mont-de-Marsan, Raymond Poulidor
Stasegem: Roger Swerts
Wielsbeke, Roger Swerts
Overall Vuelta a España, Rolf Wolfshohl

Stages 4a & 16, Raymond Poulidor
Stage 10a, Frans Melckenbeeck

Ploneour-Lanvern, Georges Chappe
Saint-Laurent-des-Hommes, Rolf Wolfshohl
Ninove, Roger Swerts
Brussels–Liege, Roger Swerts
Overall Tour de la Manche, Yves Vignolles
Erembodegem, Frans Melckenbeeck
Ferriere-la-Grande, Jean-Claude Annaert
Stages 5b & 14 Tour de France, Raymond Poulidor
Eine, Roger Swerts
Callac, Raymond Poulidor
Scherpenheuvel, Victor Van Schil
Plemet, Jean Gainche
Nijlen, Victor Van Schil
Tessenderlo Criterium, Roger Swerts
Antwerpen, Frans Aerenhouts
Cajarc, Rolf Wolfshohl
Zottegem, Frans Aerenhouts
Geetbets, Victor Van Schil
Overijse, Joseph Spruyt
Hennebont, Jean Marcarini
Overall Montjuich, Raymond Poulidor

Stages 1a & 1b, Raymond Poulidor

Niel Cyclo-cross, Rolf Wolfshohl

== 1966 – Mercier–BP–Hutchinson ==
Kleineichen, Cyclo-cross, Rolf Wolfshohl
Germany National Cyclo-cross Championship, Rolf Wolfshohl
Omloop Het Volk, Alfons Cools
Stage 6b Paris–Nice, Raymond Poulidor
Plougasnou, Seamus Elliott
Overall Critérium International, Raymond Poulidor

Stage 1, Gilbert Bellone
Stage 3, Raymond Poulidor

Chateauneuf, Gilbert Bellone
Stage 1a Tour of Belgium, Victor Van Schil
Saint-Claud, Gilbert Bellone
Belgium National Interclub Championships, Roger Swerts
Stage 2 Tour of Belgium, Alfons Cools
Hechtel, Alfons Cools
Mont Faron Chrono, Raymond Poulidor
Stage 5a Quatre Jours de Dunkerque, Rolf Wolfshohl
Frankfurt am Main, Barry Hoban
Labastide-d'Armagnac, Christian Leduc
Ploudalmezeau, Seamus Elliott
Overall Critérium du Dauphiné, Raymond Poulidor

Stage 7b, Raymond Poulidor

Cours, Victor Van Schil
Aartrijke, Albert Bourgois
Sint-Truiden, Alfons Cools
Boucles de la Seine St Denis, Jean-Louis Bodin
Stage 14b Tour de France, Raymond Poulidor
Melle, Frans Melckenbeeck
Schoten, Joseph Spruyt
Quillan, Raymond Poulidor
Lubbeek, Frans Aerenhouts
Bussieres, Raymond Poulidor
Oostkamp, Barry Hoban
Heule, Frans Melckenbeeck
Heist-op-den-Berg, Victor Van Schil
Chanteloup Cyclo-cross, Rolf Wolfshohl
Laarne Cyclo-cross, Rolf Wolfshohl

== 1967 – Mercier–BP–Hutchinson ==
Fréjus, Francis Campaner
Gent–Ieper, Jos Van Mechelen
Paris–Camembert, Georges Chappe
Kortrijk–Galmaarden, Jos Van Mechelen
Belgium National Interclub Championships, Joseph Spruyt
Stage 8 Vuelta a España, Gilbert Bellone
Stage 15b Vuelta a España, Raymond Poulidor
Stabroek, Roger Swerts
Falisolle, Eddy Beugels
Stage 5b Tour de France, Joseph Spruyt
Stage 14 Tour de France, Barry Hoban
Stage 22b Tour de France, Raymond Poulidor
Overall Tour de la province de Liege, Henk Hiddinga
Callac, Barry Hoban
Stage 2 Circuit du Morbihan, Jean Marcarini
GP de Belgique, Eddy Beugels
Chateau-Chinon Criterium, Barry Hoban
Ussel, Raymond Poulidor
Turnhout, Joseph Spruyt
Assent, Joseph Spruyt
Hennebont, Andre Foucher
Oostrozebeke Criterium, Herman Van Loo
Overall Montjuich, Raymond Poulidor

Stage 1b, Raymond Poulidor

Lausanne, Raymond Poulidor

== 1968 – Mercier–BP–Hutchinson ==
Saint-Tropez, Cyrille Guimard
Genova–Nice, Cyrille Guimard
Critérium International, Raymond Poulidor
Stage 3 Tour of Belgium, Raymond Poulidor
Chateauneuf, Raymond Poulidor
Baasrode, Eddy Peelman
Denain, Jean Stablinski
Tour de Wallonie, Eddy Beugels
Frankfurt am Main, Eddy Beugels
Stage 3b Quatre Jours de Dunkerque, Raymond Poulidor
Maurs, Gilbert Bellone
Guéret, Raymond Poulidor
Tienen, Graham Webb
Stage 4 Tour de France, Georges Chappe
Stage 10 Tour de France, Gilbert Bellone
Stage 17 Tour de France, Jean-Pierre Genet
Stage 19 Tour de France, Barry Hoban
Vilvoorde, Alfons Cools
Tessenderlo Criterium, Graham Webb
Seignelay, Gilbert Bellone
Reims, Raymond Poulidor
Gentbrugge, Eddy Peelman
Kalmthout, Graham Webb
Chateaugiron, Cyrille Guimard
Felletin, Gilbert Bellone
Stage 4 Paris–Luxembourg, Cyrille Guimard
Charlieu, Cyrille Guimard
Noyal, Eddy Beugels
Baasrode, Eddy Peelman
Bethon, Raymond Poulidor
Overall Montjuich, Raymond Poulidor

Stages 1a & 1b, Raymond Poulidor

Aulnay-sous-Bois, Cyrille Guimard

== 1969 – Mercier–BP–Hutchinson ==
Conflans-Sainte-Honorine Cyclo-cross, Raymond Poulidor
Genova–Nice, Cyrille Guimard
Nice–Seillans, Raymond Poulidor
Stage 1a Paris–Nice, Raymond Poulidor
Paris–Camembert, Raymond Riotte
Stage 4a Tour of the Basque Country, Raymond Riotte
Stage 4b Tour of the Basque Country, Raymond Poulidor
GP Petit Varois, Francis Campaner
Stage 1b Quatre Jours de Dunkerque, Barry Hoban
Overall Critérium du Dauphiné, Raymond Poulidor

1st Prologue & Stage 5, Raymond Poulidor

Stages 2a & 4b GP du Midi-Libre, Cyrille Guimard
Herouville, Cyrille Guimard
Stages 18 & 19 Tour de France, Barry Hoban
Brette-les-Pins, Raymond Poulidor
Lokeren, Eddy Peelman
Isse, Cyrille Guimard
Meymac, Walter Ricci
Saint-Medard-de-Guizieres, Francis Campaner
Stage 2 Tour du Nord, Raymond Riotte
Pleyber-Christ, Paul Lemeteyer
Puurs, Eddy Peelman
Aalter, Eddy Peelman
Petegem, Alfons Cools

== 1970 – Fagor–Mercier–Hutchinson ==
Germany National Cyclo-cross Championship, Rolf Wolfshohl
Stage 5 Vuelta a Levante, Domingo Perurena
Critérium International, Georges Chappe
Paris–Camembert, Georges Chappe
Mountains classification Vuelta al País Vasco, Domingo Perurena

Stage 4 Vuelta al País Vasco, Domingo Perurena

Stages 1 & 6 Vuelta a España, Eddy Peelman
Stage 18 Vuelta a España, José María Errandonea
Nantes, Cyrille Guimard
Saint-Thomas-de-Cônac, Raymond Poulidor
Zele, Eddy Peelman
Ohain, Eduard Janssens
Boucles de la Seine St Denis, Jean-Pierre Genet
Stage 1 Tour de France, Cyrille Guimard
Stage 20a Tour de France, Rolf Wolfshohl
Callac, Cyrille Guimard
Bernos-Beaulac, Bernard Labourdette
Arendonk, Eddy Peelman
Mountains classification Volta a Catalunya, Domingo Perurena
Stage 2b Vuelta Ciclista a la Rioja, Bernard Labourdette
Brussels Six Days, Jacky Mourioux

== 1971 – Fagor–Mercier–Hutchinson ==
Grenoble Six Days, Alain van Lancker &Jacky Mourioux
Conflans-Sainte-Honorine Cyclo-cross, Rolf Wolfshohl
Genova–Nice, Gerard Vianen
Stage 5 Paris–Nice, Gerard Vianen
Ledegem, Jacky Mourioux
Critérium International, Raymond Poulidor
Overall Setmana Catalana de Ciclismo, Raymond Poulidor
Paris–Camembert, Gérard Moneyron
Stage 5 Vuelta al País Vasco, Cyrille Guimard
Points classification Vuelta a España, Cyrille Guimard

Combination classification, Cyrille Guimard
Stages 2, 6 & 13, Eddy Peelman
Stages 3 & 15, Cyrille Guimard
Stage 10, Gerard Vianen

Labastide-d'Armagnac, Cyrille Guimard
Boucles de la Seine St Denis, Gérard Moneyron
Stage 4 Tour de France, Jean-Pierre Genet
Stage 2b, 7a, 8a, Volta a Portugal, Gerard Vianen
Callac, Cyrille Guimard
Stage 13b Volta a Portugal, Jacques Cadiou
Gippingen, Michel Périn
Stage 16a Volta a Portugal, Georges Chappe
Meslan, Jacques Cadiou
Eeklo, Eddy Peelman
Schinnen, Gerard Vianen
Waarschoot, Eddy Peelman
Zwevezele, Eddy Peelman
Overall Étoile des Espoirs, Raymond Poulidor

Stage 5, Raymond Poulidor

Berlin Cyclo-cross, Rolf Wolfshohl
Hannover Cyclo-cross, Rolf Wolfshohl

== 1972 – Gan–Mercier–Hutchinson ==
Mazé Cyclo-cross, Cyrille Guimard
Overall Paris–Nice, Raymond Poulidor

Stage 6, Jean-Pierre Genet
Stage 7a, Eddy Peelman
Stage 7b, Raymond Poulidor

Stage 1b Setmana Catalana de Ciclismo, Raymond Poulidor
Stage 2 Setmana Catalana de Ciclismo, Cyrille Guimard
Critérium International, Raymond Poulidor
Kampenhout, Eddy Peelman
Paris–Bourges, Cyrille Guimard
Gullegem : Eddy Peelman
Stage 3 Tour de Luxembourg, Cyrille Guimard
Overall GP du Midi-Libre, Cyrille Guimard

Stages 1 & 2a, Cyrille Guimard

Stages 1, 4, 14b & 15 Tour de France, Cyrille Guimard
Callac, Raymond Poulidor
Lamballe, Yves Ravaleu
Château-Chinon Criterium, Cyrille Guimard
Sarzeau Cyrille Guimard
Moorslede Criterium, Cyrille Guimard
Pleurtuit, Raymond Poulidor
Langemark, Régis Delépine
Prologue Étoile des Espoirs, Gérard Moneyron
Villamblard, Raymond Poulidor

== 1973 – Gan–Mercier–Hutchinson ==
Overall Paris–Nice, Raymond Poulidor
Stage 5 Tour de Romandie, Gérard Moneyron
Saint-Macaire-en-Mauges, Raymond Poulidor
Stage 3 Tour de France, Cyrille Guimard
Stages 11 & 19 Tour de France, Barry Hoban
Lamballe, Cyrille Guimard
Rieux, Raymond Poulidor
Issé, Cyrille Guimard
Essen, Cees Bal
Circuit des Frontières, Cees Bal

== 1974 – Gan–Mercier–Hutchinson ==
Stage 1 Tour Méditerranéen, Jacky Mourioux
Stage 2 Tour Méditerranéen, Joop Zoetemelk
Overall Paris–Nice, Joop Zoetemelk

Stages 6a & 7b, Joop Zoetemelk

Overall Setmana Catalana de Ciclismo, Joop Zoetemelk

Combination classification, Joop Zoetemelk
Stage 1, Cees Bal
Stage 5, Joop Zoetemelk

Tour of Flanders, Cees Bal
Gent–Wevelgem, Barry Hoban
Amstel Gold Race, Gerrie Knetemann
Overall Tour de Romandie, Joop Zoetemelk

Stage 3, Christian Raymond
Stage 4, Joop Zoetemelk

Kloosterzande Criterium, Gerrie Knetemann
Overall Tour de l'Aude, Cees Bal
France National Road Championship, Road Race, Georges Talbourdet
Stage 13 Tour de France, Barry Hoban
Stage 14 Tour de France, Jean-Pierre Genet
Stage 16 Tour de France, Raymond Poulidor
Stage 20 Tour de France, Gerard Vianen
Plessala, Georges Talbourdet
Château-Chinon Criterium, Raymond Poulidor
Rieux, Christian Raymond
Ambarès-et-La Grave, Raymond Poulidor
Vendôme, Raymond Poulidor
Grenoble Six Days, Jacky Mourioux

== 1975 – Gan–Mercier–Hutchinson ==
Overall Paris–Nice, Joop Zoetemelk

Stages 6a & 7b, Joop Zoetemelk

Stage 4 Setmana Catalana de Ciclismo, Christian Seznec
Drancy, Joop Zoetemelk
Geleen, Joop Zoetemelk
Stage 3 Tour de Romandie, Gerrie Knetemann
Prologue Tour de l'Aude, Cees Bal
Kloosterzande Criterium, Cees Bal
Haaksbergen, Gerrie Knetemann
Stage 8 Tour de France, Barry Hoban
Stage 11 Tour de France, Joop Zoetemelk
Stage 12 Tour de France, Gerrie Knetemann
Lamballe, Georges Talbourdet
Heerhugowaard, Joop Zoetemelk
Linne, Gerard Vianen
Pijnacker, Cees Bal
Le Quillio, Christian Seznec
Drancy, Joop Zoetemelk
Stage 3 Tour du Limousin, Raymond Poulidor
Sittard-Geleen, Joop Zoetemelk
Stage 1b Montjuich, Joop Zoetemelk
Overall À travers Lausanne, Joop Zoetemelk

Stage 1, Joop Zoetemelk

== 1976 – Gan–Mercier–Hutchinson ==
Overall Étoile de Bessèges, Maurice Le Guilloux
Stage 4 Tour Méditerranéen, Régis Delépine
La Flèche Wallonne, Joop Zoetemelk
Stages 2 & 4 Circuit Cycliste Sarthe, Régis Delépine
Paris–Limoges, Maurice Le Guilloux
Stage 3 Critérium du Dauphiné, Joop Zoetemelk
Stages 9, 10 & 20 Tour de France, Joop Zoetemelk
Callac, Joop Zoetemelk
Château-Chinon Criterium, Yves Hézard
Stage 1a Montjuich, Joop Zoetemelk
Overall À travers Lausanne, Joop Zoetemelk

Stages 1 & 2, Joop Zoetemelk

== 1977 – Miko–Mercier–Hutchinson ==
Pogny, Raymond Poulidor
Plessala, Joop Zoetemelk
Simpelveld, Joop Zoetemelk
Echt, Joop Zoetemelk
Combination classification Volta a Catalunya, Joop Zoetemelk

Stage 4a, Joop Zoetemelk

Paris–Tours, Joop Zoetemelk
Overall À travers Lausanne, Joop Zoetemelk

Stages 1 & 2, Joop Zoetemelk

== 1978 – Miko–Mercier–Hutchinson ==
Stage 1 Étoile de Bessèges, Leo Van Vliet
Montauroux, Joop Zoetemelk
Stage 1 Paris–Nice, Joop Zoetemelk
Stage 4 Paris–Nice, André Mollet
Stage 1 Critérium International, Raymond Martin
Stage 2 Critérium International, Joop Zoetemelk
Stage 3 Circuit Cycliste Sarthe, Raymond Martin
Pogny, Charly Rouxel
Stage 14 Tour de France, Joop Zoetemelk
Stage 17 Tour de France, Christian Seznec
Santpoort, Leo Van Vliet
Stage 1 Ronde van Nederland, Leo Van Vliet
Overall À travers Lausanne, Joop Zoetemelk

Stages 1 & 2, Joop Zoetemelk

== 1979 – Miko–Mercier–Vivagel ==
Pétange Cyclo-cross, Lucien Zeimes
Stage 3 Étoile de Bessèges, Joop Zoetemelk
Tour du Haut-Var, Joop Zoetemelk
Overall Paris–Nice, Joop Zoetemelk

Stage 4, Sven-Åke Nilsson
Stage 7b, Joop Zoetemelk

Overall Critérium International, Joop Zoetemelk

Stage 2, Joop Zoetemelk

Empire Stores Marathon Elite Road Race, Barry Hoban
Stage 12 Tour de France, Christian Seznec
Stage 18 Tour de France, Joop Zoetemelk
Lamballe Criterium, Joop Zoetemelk
Linne Criterium, Joop Zoetemelk
Mijl van Mares Joop Zoetemelk
Château-Chinon Criterium, Joop Zoetemelk
Stage 4 Tour du Limousin, Patrick Friou
GP Plouay, Frits Pirard
Paris–Tours, Joop Zoetemelk
Overall À travers Lausanne, Joop Zoetemelk

Stages 1 & 2, Joop Zoetemelk

== 1980 – Miko–Mercier–Vivagel ==
Stage 2a Tour de Corse, Didier Lebaud
Stage 4 Tour de Corse, Joël Gallopin
Stage 2 Critérium International, Sven-Åke Nilsson
Overall Tour d'Armorique, Patrick Friou

Stage 1, Patrick Friou

Mountains classification Tour de France, Raymond Martin

Stage 6, Jean-Louis Gauthier
Stage 13, Raymond Martin

Castres, Serge Perin
Agon-Coutainville, Raymond Martin
GP Plouay, Patrick Friou
Stage 1a Montjuich, Raymond Martin

== 1981 – Miko–Mercier–Vivagel ==
Cannes, Kim Andersen
Prologue Vuelta a España, Regis Clère
Stage 10 Vuelta a España, Kim Andersen
Stage 12 Vuelta a España, Frédéric Vichot
Stage 15b Vuelta a España, Regis Clère
Les Ormes, Regis Clère

== 1982 – COOP–Mercier–Mavic ==
Stage 3 Circuit Cycliste Sarthe, Claude Moreau
Coutances, Joop Zoetemelk
Stage 3 Tour de l'Aude, Kim Andersen
France National Road Championship, Road Race, Regis Clère
United Kingdom National Road Championship, Road Race, John Herety
Harrogate, John Herety
Lamballe, Regis Clère
Stage 9 Tour de l'Avenir, Hubert Mathis
Stage 1b Montjuich, Joop Zoetemelk

== 1983 – COOP–Mercier–Mavic ==
Tour du Haut-Var, Joop Zoetemelk
Stage 4a Circuit Cycliste Sarthe, Claude Moreau
Stage 2 (TTT) Tour de France
Stage 11 Tour de France, Regis Clère
Stage 12 Tour de France, Kim Andersen
Stage 14 Tour de France, Pierre Le Bigaut
Stage 16 Tour de France, Michel Laurent
Stage 18 Tour de France, Jacques Michaud
Joigny, Pierre Le Bigaut
Linne, Joop Zoetemelk
Stiphout, Joop Zoetemelk
Brest, Pierre Le Bigaut
GP Plouay, Pierre Bazzo
Ossendrecht, Joop Zoetemelk
Stage 3 Tour de l'Avenir, Frédéric Vichot
Stage 9 Tour de l'Avenir, Pierre-Henri Menthéour
Cluses, Jacques Michaud
