= GP Dr. Eugeen Roggeman =

Belgian cycling race

- Poster to the 97th edition in 2023

Race details
- Date: September
- Region: Stekene, East Flanders (Belgium)
- English name: Grand Prize Doctor Eugeen Roggeman
- Local name: Grote Prijs Dokter Eugeen Roggeman (in Dutch)
- Discipline: Road
- Type: One-day race
- Web site: www.stekenekoerst.be

History
- First edition: 1929
- Editions: 99 (as of 2025)
- First winner: August Meuleman (BEL)
- Most wins: Theo Middelkamp (NED); Karel De Baere (BEL); Noël De Pauw (BEL); André Dierickx (BEL); Jean-Pierre Heynderickx (BEL); (2 wins)
- Most recent: Anton Stensby (NOR)

The GP Burgemeester Dokter Eugeen Roggeman is a Belgian cycling race organized for the first time in 1929. The race is named after doctor Eugeen Roggeman (1883–1965), who was mayor of Stekene for more than 38 years (from 1927 to 1965).

With Stekene as both start and finish place, the course variates between 156 and 170 km.

The competition's roll of honor includes the successes of Romain Maes, Stan Ockers, Rik Van Looy and Jan Janssen.

== Winners ==
| Year | Winner | Second | Third |
|---|---|---|---|
| 1929 | (Belgium) August Meuleman | (Belgium) Kamiel De Graeve | (Belgium) Albert Billiet |
| 1930 | (Belgium) Frans Bonduel | (Belgium) Jan Meeuwis | (Belgium) Gerard Lambrechts |
| 1931 | (Belgium) Godfried De Vocht | (Belgium) Alfons Deloor | (Belgium) Gustaaf Deloor |
| 1932 | (Belgium) Alfred Hamerlinck | (Belgium) Frans Bonduel | (Belgium) Odiel Van Hevel |
| 1933 | (Belgium) Romain Maes | (Belgium) Leo De Ryck | (Belgium) Sylvère Maes |
| 1934 | (Belgium) Gustaaf Deloor | (Belgium) Maurice Raes | (Belgium) Constant Dyzers |
| 1935 | (Belgium) Frans Van Hassel | (Belgium) Michel D'Hooghe | (Belgium) Karel Clapdorp |
| 1936 | (Netherlands) Theo Middelkamp | (Belgium) Jérôme Dufromont | (Belgium) Richard Noterman |
| 1937 | (Belgium) Maurice Raes | (Belgium) Frans Van Hassel | (Belgium) Roger Vandendriessche |
| 1938 | (Belgium) Louis Noens | (Belgium) Alfons Deloor | (Belgium) Frans Spiessens |
| 1939 | No race | | |
| 1940 | (Belgium) Robert Van Eenaeme | (Belgium) Albert Bruylandt | (Belgium) Sylvain Grysolle |
| 1941 | (Belgium) Stan Ockers | (Belgium) Lode Janssens | (Belgium) Jan Van Steen |
| 1942 | (France) Julien Douws | (France) Aloïs Meerschaert | (Belgium) Albert Bruylandt |
| 1943 | (Belgium) Gustaaf Van Overloop | (Belgium) Eugène Alpaerts | (Belgium) Sidon De Busscher |
| 1944 | No race | | |
| 1945 (1) | (Belgium) Joseph Moerenhout | (Belgium) Georges Vandermeirsch | (Belgium) Emiel Faignaert |
| 1945 (2) | (Netherlands) Theo Middelkamp | (Belgium) Maurice Van Herzele | (Belgium) Roger Gyselinck |
| 1946 | (Belgium) Lucien Mathys | (Belgium) Roger De Corte | (Belgium) André Pieters |
| 1947 | (Belgium) Michel Hermie | (Belgium) Constant Lauwers | (Belgium) Gustaaf Van Overloop |
| 1948 (1) | (Belgium) Maurice Desimpelaere | (Belgium) Albert Sercu | (Belgium) Kamiel De Backer |
| 1948 (2) | (Belgium) Roger Desmet | (Belgium) Eugène Alpaerts | (Belgium) Karel De Baere |
| 1949 | (Belgium) Georges Desplenter | (Belgium) Julien Van Dycke | (Belgium) Maurice Blomme |
| 1950 (1) | (Belgium) René Adriaenssens | (Belgium) Jozef Van Staeyen | (Belgium) Arsène Rijckaert |
| 1951 (2) | (Belgium) Emiel Van der Veken | (Belgium) André Maelbrancke | (Belgium) Omer Braeckeveldt |
| 1951 | (Belgium) Gerard Buyl | (Belgium) Jozef Van Staeyen | (Belgium) Louis Brusselmans |
| 1952 | (Belgium) Henri Van Kerckhove | (Belgium) Ernest Allemeersch | (Belgium) Arsène Rijckaert |
| 1953 | (Belgium) Karel De Baere | (Belgium) Prosper Depredomme | (Belgium) Aloïs Deloor |
| 1954 | (Belgium) Jan Adriaensens | (Belgium) Roger De Corte | (Belgium) Marcel Goddaert |
| 1955 | (Belgium) Roger De Corte | (Belgium) Karel De Baere | (Netherlands) Eddy de Waal |
| 1956 | (Belgium) Calixte Van Steenbrugge | (Belgium) Joseph Planckaert | (Belgium) Jos De Beukelaere |
| 1957 | (Belgium) Karel De Baere | (Belgium) Michel Van Aerde | (Belgium) Léon De Lathouwer |
| 1958 | (Belgium) Rik Van Looy | (Belgium) Roger Devoldere | (Belgium) Marcel Buys |
| 1959 | (Belgium) Gentiel Saelens | (Belgium) Oswald Declercq | (Belgium) Daniel Doom |
| 1960 | (Belgium) Oswald Declercq | (Belgium) Gilbert Saelens | (Belgium) Willy Butzen |
| 1961 | (Belgium) Émile Daems | (Belgium) Roger De Coninck | (Belgium) Arnould Flécy |
| 1962 | (Belgium) Jos Wouters | (Belgium) Etienne Vercauteren | (Belgium) Lode Troonbeeckx |
| 1963 | (Belgium) Jos Geurts | (Belgium) Rik Luyten | (Belgium) Leon Van Daele |
| 1964 | (Belgium) Frans Verbeeck | (Belgium) Edward Sels | (Belgium) Gustaaf De Smet |
| 1965 | (Belgium) August Verhaegen | (Belgium) Raymond Vrancken | (Belgium) Gustaaf De Smet |
| 1966 (1) | (Belgium) Noël De Pauw | (Netherlands) Gerben Karstens | (Belgium) Herman Vanspringel |
| 1966 (2) | (Netherlands) Jos van der Vleuten | (Belgium) Theo Verschueren | (Belgium) Victor Van Schil |
| 1967 (1) | (Belgium) Edward Sels | (Belgium) Jozef Boons | (Belgium) Gilbert De Smet |
| 1967 (2) | (Belgium) Noël De Pauw | (Netherlands) Jos van der Vleuten | (Belgium) Frans Brands |
| 1968 (1) | (Belgium) Albert Van Vlierberghe | (Belgium) Jos Haeseldonckx | (Belgium) Jozef Janssens |
| 1968 (2) | (Belgium) Émile Bodart | (Netherlands) Jan Harings | (Belgium) Albert Van Vlierberghe |
| 1969 (1) | (Belgium) Roger Blockx | (Belgium) René De Bie | (Netherlands) Richard Bukacki |
| 1969 (2) | (Netherlands) Jan Janssen | (Belgium) Roger De Vlaeminck | (Netherlands) Richard Bukacki |
| 1970 (1) | (Belgium) André Dierickx | (Belgium) Eddy Peelman | (Netherlands) Christian Callens |
| 1970 (2) | (Netherlands) Jos van Beers | (Netherlands) Richard Bukacki | (Belgium) Eddy Goossens |
| 1971 | (Belgium) Willy Debosscher | (Netherlands) Harm Ottenbros | (Belgium) Tony Daelemans |
| 1972 | (Belgium) Etienne Antheunis | (Belgium) Maryan Polansky | (Belgium) Franky Ebo |
| 1973 | (Belgium) André Dierickx | (Belgium) Ronny Van de Vijver | (Netherlands) Cees Bal |
| 1974 | (Netherlands) Gerben Karstens | (Belgium) Victor Van Schil | (Belgium) Bernard Draux |
| 1975 | (Belgium) Willem Peeters | (Belgium) Bernard Bourguignon | (Netherlands) Jan Aling |
| 1976 | (Netherlands) Cees Bal | (Belgium) Joseph Norguet | (Belgium) Eddy Verstraeten |
| 1977 | (Belgium) Willy Govaerts | (Belgium) Eddy Verstraeten | (Belgium) Albert Van Vlierberghe |
| 1978 | (Belgium) Daniel Willems | (Belgium) Frank Hoste | (Netherlands) Piet van Katwijk |
| 1979 | (Belgium) Ghislain Van Landeghem | (Belgium) Rudy Hendrickx | (Belgium) Willy Govaerts |
| 1980 | (Belgium) Herman Beysens | (Belgium) François Caethoven | (South Africa) Alan van Heerden |
| 1981 | (Belgium) Jos Gysemans | (Belgium) Danny Nooytens | (Belgium) Walter Schoonjans |
| 1982 | (Belgium) Johnny De Nul | (Belgium) Benjamin Vermeulen | (Netherlands) Mario van Vlimmeren |
| 1983 | (Belgium) Jos Jacobs | (Belgium) Roger De Vlaeminck | (Belgium) Guido Van Calster |
| 1984 | (Belgium) Frans Van Vlierberghe | (Netherlands) Theo de Rooij | (Belgium) Jan Bogaert |
| 1985 | (Belgium) Roger Ilegems | (Belgium) Johnny De Nul | (Belgium) Dirk Heirweg |
| 1986 | (Belgium) Roger De Cnijf | (Belgium) Ludo Giesberts | (Belgium) Roger Ilegems |
| 1987 | (Belgium) Jerry Cooman | (Belgium) Ludo Schurgers | (Belgium) Chris Scharmin |
| 1988 | (Belgium) Bruno Geuens | (Belgium) Filip Van Vooren | (Belgium) Ronny Vlassaks |
| 1989 | (Denmark) Kim Eriksen | (Belgium) Roger Ilegems | (Belgium) Rudy Van Gheluwe |
| 1990 | (Belgium) Marc Sprangers | (Belgium) Peter Van Impe | (Belgium) Patrick Schoovaerts |
| 1991 | (Belgium) Pierre Dewailly | (Belgium) Peter Saey | (Belgium) Patrick Schoovaerts |
| 1992 | (Belgium) Jan Bogaert | (Netherlands) Johan Melsen | (Belgium) Mario De Clercq |
| 1993 | (Belgium) Jean-Pierre Heynderickx | (Belgium) Greg Moens | (Belgium) Johnny Dauwe |
| 1994 | (Belgium) Carlo Bomans | (Belgium) Wim Feys | (Belgium) Willy Willems |
| 1995 | (Belgium) Jean-Pierre Heynderickx | (Belgium) Danny Daelman | (Belgium) Peter De Clercq |
| 1996 | (Belgium) Peter Spaenhoven | (Belgium) Danny Daelman | (Belgium) Tim Lenaers |
| 1997 | (Belgium) Tim Lenaers | (Ukraine) Vadim Volar | (Belgium) Danny Daelman |
| 1998 | (Belgium) Etienne De Wilde | (Belgium) Geert Verheyen | (Lithuania) Darius Strole |
| 1999 | (Belgium) Wim Omloop | (Belgium) Bart Heirewegh | (Netherlands) Berry Hoedemakers |
| 2000 | (United Kingdom) Roger Hammond | (Belgium) Ludovic Capelle | (Belgium) Andy Cappelle |
| 2001 | (Belgium) Erwin Thijs | (Belgium) Geert Van Bondt | (Belgium) Eric De Clercq |
| 2002 | (Belgium) Danny Daelman | (Australia) Scott McGrory | (Lithuania) Mindaugas Goncaras |
| 2003 | (Lithuania) Mindaugas Goncaras | (Lithuania) Darius Strole | (United Kingdom) Hamish Haynes |
| 2004 | (Belgium) Koen Heremans | (Netherlands) Arno Wallaard | (Australia) Hilton Clarke |
| 2005 | (Belgium) Kevin Van der Slagmolen | (Belgium) Roy Sentjens | (Lithuania) Mindaugas Goncaras |
| 2006 | (Belgium) Roy Sentjens | (Belgium) Aron Huysmans | (Germany) Paul Martens |
| 2007 | (Belgium) Sébastien Six | (Belgium) Jens Renders | (Belgium) Kurt Van Landeghem |
| 2008 | (Belgium) Steven Caethoven | (Belgium) Iljo Keisse | (Belgium) Steven Van Vooren |
| 2009 | (Netherlands) Huub Duyn | (Belgium) Steven Caethoven | (Belgium) Kristof Goddaert |
| 2010 | (Belgium) Kenny Dehaes | (Belgium) Rob Goris | (Lithuania) Aidis Kruopis |
| 2011 | (Belgium) Niko Eeckhout | (Australia) Tommy Nankervis | (Netherlands) Thomas Rabou |
| 2012 | (Belgium) Kenny Dehaes | (Belgium) Steven Caethoven | (Belgium) Timothy Stevens |
| 2013 | (Republic of Ireland) Matthew Brammeier | (Belgium) Dennis Coenen | (Belgium) Sander Cordeel |
| 2014 | (Belgium) Joeri Stallaert | (France) Adrien Petit | (Norway) Filip Eidsheim |
| 2015 | (Norway) Herman Dahl | (Belgium) Timothy Dupont | (Belgium) Kenneth Vanbilsen |
| 2016 | (Netherlands) Taco van der Hoorn | (Belgium) Timothy Dupont | (Belgium) Kenneth Vanbilsen |
| 2017 | (Belgium) Tom Van Asbroeck | (Belgium) Stijn De Bock | (Belgium) Rune Herregodts |
| 2018 | (Italy) Alberto Dainese | (Norway) Fridtjof Røinås | (Belgium) Enzo Wouters |
| 2019 | (Belgium) Stijn De Bock | (Germany) Leon Rohde | (Belgium) Fabio Van den Bossche |
| 2020 | No race due to the COVID-19 pandemic | | |
| 2021 | (Netherlands) Timo de Jong | (Netherlands) Coen Vermeltfoort | (Belgium) Matthew Van Schoor |
| 2022 | (United Kingdom) Jack Rootkin-Gray | (Belgium) Florian Vermeersch | (Belgium) Rutger Wouters |
| 2023 | (Germany) Joshua Huppertz | (United Kingdom) Finn Crockett | (Norway) Cedrik Bakke Christophersen |
| 2024 | (France) Samuel Leroux | (Australia) Brady Gilmore | (Belgium) Witse Meeussen |
| 2025 | (Norway) Anton Stensby | (Netherlands) Rico van Damme | (Norway) Halvor Utengen Sandstad |
