= 1955 Tour of Flanders =

39th Tour of Flanders
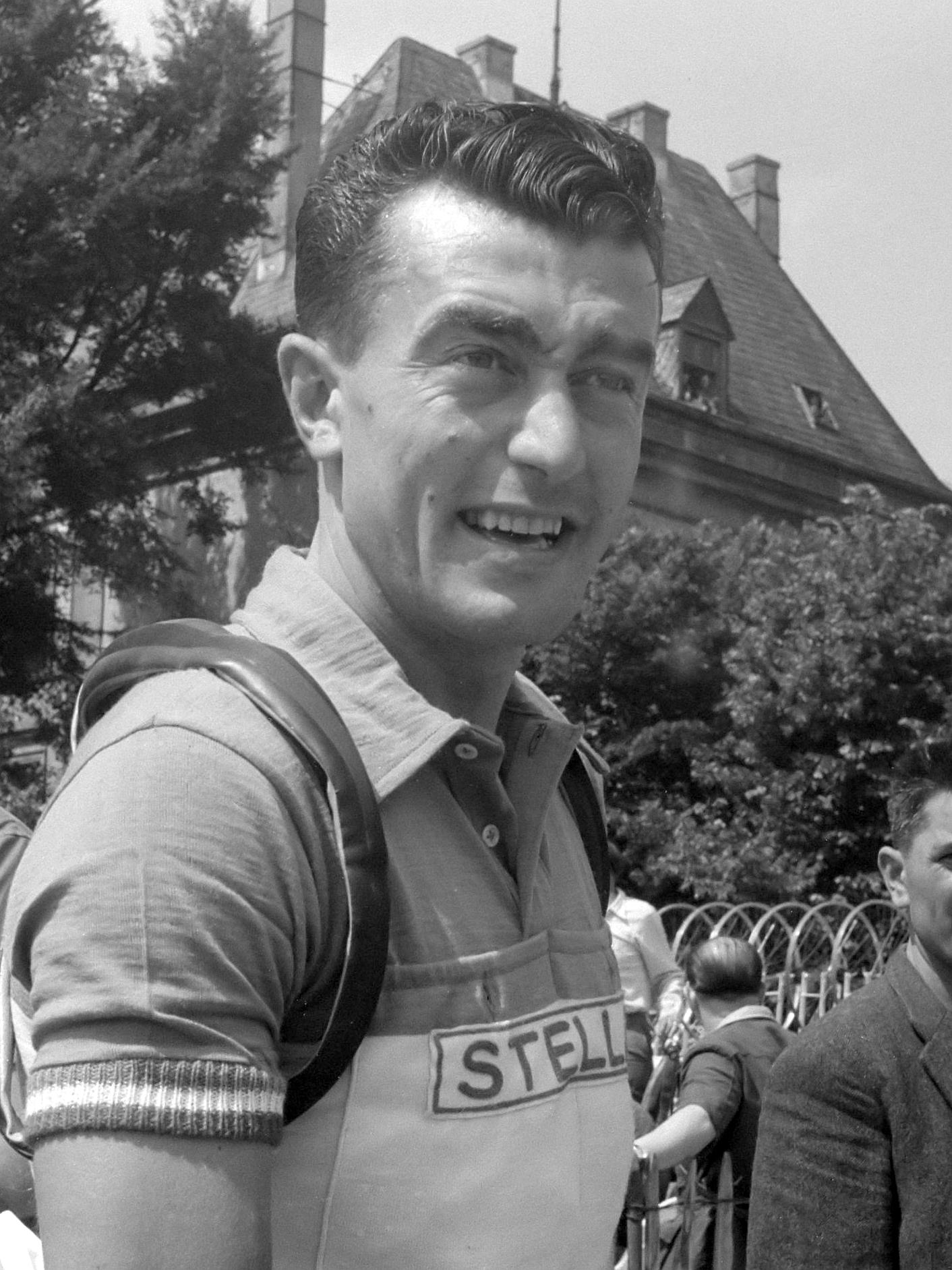
- Louison Bobet, the first French winner of the Tour of Flanders

Race details
- Dates: 27 March 1955
- Stages: 1
- Distance: 263 km (163.4 mi)
- Winning time: 7h 27'

Results
	Winner	Louison Bobet (FRA)	(Bobet–BP–Hutchinson)
	Second	Hugo Koblet (SUI)	(Faema–Guerra)
	Third	Rik Van Steenbergen (BEL)	(Elvé–Peugeot)

The 39th running of the Tour of Flanders cycling classic was held on Sunday, 27 March 1955. French rider Louison Bobet won the race in a three-man sprint with Hugo Koblet and Rik Van Steenbergen. 47 of 203 riders finished.

== Race Report ==
Rik Van Steenbergen was in an early breakaway with 12 riders and was first on the Kluisberg and Kruisberg. In Geraardsbergen, just after the peloton caught the group, Van Steenbergen, Louison Bobet, Bernard Gauthier and Hugo Koblet broke away on the steep Kloosterstraat. Gauthier did most of the work in the four-man group for his team leader Bobet. Van Steenbergen, favourite to win in the sprint, paid his earlier efforts and was beaten by Bobet and Koblet. Louison Bobet, a three-time winner of the Tour de France, secured the first ever victory for a French rider in the Tour of Flanders.

== Route ==
The race started in Ghent and finished in Wetteren – totaling 263 km. The course featured four categorized climbs:

- Kluisberg
- Kruisberg
- Edelareberg
- Kloosterstraat (Geraardsbergen)

== Results ==
Result
Rank	Rider	Team	Time
1	Louison Bobet (FRA)	Bobet–BP–Hutchinson	7h 27' 00"
2	Hugo Koblet (SUI)	Faema–Guerra	s.t.
3	Rik Van Steenbergen (BEL)	Libertas	s.t.
4	Bernard Gauthier (FRA)	Mercier–Hutchinson	+ 5"
5	Karel De Baere (BEL)	Mercier–Hutchinson	+ 22"
6	Jean Bellay (FRA)	Mercier–Hutchinson	s.t.
7	Roger Decock (BEL)	Van Hauwaert–Maes Pils	+ 28"
8	Marcel Rijckaert (BEL)	Tebag	+ 33"
9	Germain Derijcke (BEL)	Alcyon–Dunlop	s.t.
10	Lode Anthonis (BEL)	L'Avenir	s.t.
