= Paris–Camembert =

French one-day road cycling race

Race details
- Date: Mid-April
- Region: Normandy, France
- English name: Paris–Camembert
- Local name: Paris–Camembert Trophée Lepetit (in French)
- Discipline: Road race
- Competition: UCI Europe Tour
- Type: Single-day
- Web site: paris-camembert.fr

History
- First edition: 1934
- Editions: 90 (as of 2026)
- First winner: Louis Thiétard (FRA)
- Most wins: Laurent Brochard (FRA) (3 times)
- Most recent: Pierre Gautherat (FRA)

Paris–Camembert (also Paris–Camembert Trophée Lepetit or Paris–Camembert Lepetit) is a semi classic held annually in April. Since 2005, the race is organized as a 1.1 event on the UCI Europe Tour. The route of the 200 kilometres (120 mi) race has varied over the years, it previously started in Magnanville, near Paris, and finished in Vimoutiers.

The present day race starts in Pont-Audemer in the Eure department and heads south for 60 km to the environs of the finishing town of Livarot in the Calvados department. Once in the region of Livarot the race takes in seven climbs around the town, some of which are ascended several times. The climbs are namely: Côte de Chevreville-Tonnencourt (one ascent), Côte de l'Angleterre (three ascents), Butte des Fondits (three ascents), Côte de Camembert (one ascent), Côte de la Cavée de Crouttes (two ascents), Côte de Tortisambert (two ascents) and the Côte de la Becquetiere (two ascents). The last of these 14 climbs is 10 km from the finish line which is in the town centre of Livarot on the Route de Lisieux. Historically, the race attracted a mostly French field of riders, but the field has become increasingly more diverse. By the 1970s famous riders were regularly participating and sometimes winning the race: riders such as Bernard Hinault and Joop Zoetemelk added celebrity and allure to the race. Teams based in France most heavily contest the race, but the race today also draws UCI ProTour teams. Some riders also use the race in preparation for the Ardennes classics.

== Winners ==
Year	Country	Rider	Team
1934	France	Louis Thiétard	individual
1935	France	Marcel Bat	Essor–Hutchinson
1936	France	Yvan Marie	La Perle–Hutchinson
1937	France	André Auville	Alcyon–Dunlop
1938	France	Jean-Marie Goasmat	Helyett–Hutchinson
1939	France	Pierre Cloarec	A. Leducq–Hutchinson
1940	No race		
1941	No race		
1942	France	Joseph Goutorbe	Helyett–Hutchinson
1943	France	Victor Cosson	Europe–Dunlop
1944	France	Maurice De Muer	Peugeot–Dunlop
1945	No race		
1946	Italy	Paul Néri	France Sport–Dunlop
1947	France	Robert Dorgebray	Peugeot–Dunlop
1948	France	Raoul Rémy	La Perle–Hutchinson
1949	France	Jean Rey	Mercier-R. Lapébie
1950	France	Ange Le Strat	La Perle–Hutchinson
1951	France	Jean Baldassari	Mercier–Le Grevès
1952	France	Robert Varnajo	Gitane–Hutchinson
1953	France	Jean Guéguen	Mercier–Hutchinson
1954	France	Gilbert Bauvin	Gitane–Hutchinson
1955	France	Jean-Marie Cieleska	Gitane–Hutchinson
1956	France	René Fournier	Mercier–BP–Hutchinson
1957	France	Joseph Groussard	Essor–Leroux
1958	France	Nicolas Barone	Saint-Raphaël–Geminiani
1959	France	Nicolas Barone	Saint-Raphaël–Geminiani
1960	France	Joseph Groussard	Helyett–Fynsec
1961	France	Jean-Claude Annaert	Saint-Raphaël–Geminiani
1962	Netherlands	Piet Rentmeester	Gitane–Leroux
1963	France	Jacques Simon	Saint-Raphaël–Geminiani
1964	Netherlands	Arie den Hartog	Saint-Raphaël–Gitane
1965	France	Pierre Everaert	Ford France–Gitane
1966	France	Désiré Letort	Peugeot–BP–Michelin
1967	France	Georges Chappe	Mercier–BP–Hutchinson
1968	Netherlands	Harry Steevens	Willem II–Gazelle
1969	France	Raymond Riotte	Mercier–BP–Hutchinson
1970	France	Georges Chappe	Fagor–Mercier–Hutchinson
1971	France	Gérard Moneyron	Fagor–Mercier–Hutchinson
1972	France	José Catieau	Sonolor–Lejeune
1973	France	Régis Delépine	Gan–Mercier–Hutchinson
1974	France	Alain Santy	Gan–Mercier–Hutchinson
1975	France	Raymond Martin	Miko–Mercier
1976	France	Bernard Hinault	Gitane–Campagnolo
1977	France	Hubert Linard	Peugeot–Esso–Michelin
1978	Netherlands	Joop Zoetemelk	COOP–Mercier
1979	France	Raymond Martin	COOP–Mercier
1980	France	Pierre-Raymond Villemiane	Renault–Elf–Gitane
1981	France	Guy Gallopin	Sem–France Loire–Campagnolo
1982	France	Christian Jourdan	La Redoute–Motobécane
1983	France	Christian Jourdan	La Redoute–Motobécane
1984	France	Hubert Linard	Peugeot–Shell–Michelin
1985	France	Martial Gayant	Renault–Elf–Gitane
1986	Denmark	Kim Andersen	La Vie Claire
1987	Netherlands	Mathieu Hermans	Caja Rural–Orbea
1988	France	Laurent Fignon	Système U
1989	West Germany	Andreas Kappes	Toshiba
1990	France	Thierry Marie	Castorama
1991	Denmark	Brian Holm	Histor–Sigma
1992	France	Patrice Esnault	Chazal–Vanille et Mûre
1993	Kazakhstan	Oleg Kozlitine	Chazal–Vetta–MBK
1994	France	Armand de Las Cuevas	Castorama
1995	Belgium	Andrei Tchmil	Lotto–Isoglass
1996	Italy	Adriano Baffi	Mapei–GB
1997	Switzerland	Mauro Gianetti	Française des Jeux
1998	France	Pascal Lino	Big Mat–Auber 93
1999	Italy	Fabiano Fontanelli	Mercatone Uno–Bianchi
2000	France	Didier Rous	Bonjour
2001	France	Laurent Brochard	Jean Delatour
2002	Sweden	Marcus Ljungqvist	Team Fakta
2003	France	Laurent Brochard	AG2R Prévoyance
2004	France	Franck Bouyer	Brioches La Boulangère
2005	France	Laurent Brochard	Bouygues Télécom
2006	France	Anthony Geslin	Bouygues Télécom
2007	France	Sébastien Joly	Française des Jeux
2008	Spain	Alejandro Valverde	Caisse d'Epargne
2009	France	Jimmy Casper	Besson Chaussures–Sojasun
2010	France	Sébastien Minard	Cofidis
2011	France	Sandy Casar	FDJ
2012	France	Pierre-Luc Périchon	La Pomme Marseille
2013	France	Pierrick Fédrigo	FDJ
2014	France	Bryan Coquard	Team Europcar
2015	France	Julien Loubet	Team Marseille 13 KTM
2016	France	Cyril Gautier	AG2R La Mondiale
2017	France	Nacer Bouhanni	Cofidis
2018	France	Lilian Calmejane	Direct Énergie
2019	France	Benoît Cosnefroy	AG2R La Mondiale
2020	France	Dorian Godon	AG2R La Mondiale
2021	France	Dorian Godon	AG2R Citroën Team
2022	France	Anthony Delaplace	Arkéa–Samsic
2023	France	Valentin Ferron	Team TotalEnergies
2024	France	Benoît Cosnefroy	Decathlon–AG2R La Mondiale
2025	Belgium	Lander Loockx	Unibet Tietema Rockets
2026	France	Pierre Gautherat	Decathlon CMA CGM
