= Jean Guéguen =

French cyclist

Personal information
- Born: 1 April 1924 14th arrondissement of Paris, France
- Died: 9 May 1998 (aged 74) Saint-Jean-d'Aulps, France

Cycling career
- Sport: Cycling
- Discipline: Road
- Role: Rider

Professional teams
- 1946–1947: Alcyon–Dunlop
- 1948–1954: Mercier–Hutchinson
- 1950: Lutetia
- 1952: Vicini
- 1955: Arliguie–Hutchinson
- 1956: Essor–Leroux

Jean Guéguen (1 April 1924 – 9 May 1998) was a French racing cyclist. He rode in the 1951 Tour de France.

== Major results ==
1945
1st Road race, National Amateur Road Championships
1948
1st Stages 8 (ITT), 14 (ITT) & 15 Volta a Portugal
1949
1st Stage 5b Critérium du Dauphiné Libéré
1st Stages 11 & 15b Volta a Portugal
1951
1st Paris–Brussels
1st Circuit de la Haute-Savoie
2nd Overall Paris–Saint-Étienne

1st Stage 2

2nd Paris–Montceau-les-Mines
5th Paris–Roubaix
1952
1st Paris–Clermont-Ferrand
1st Stage 5 Tour d'Algérie
1st Stage 9 Tour de l'Ouest
3rd Bordeaux–Paris
1953
1st Paris–Camembert
1st Paris–Montceau-les-Mines
1954
1st Circuit du Morbihan
3rd Paris–Camembert
