= Tour de l'Ouest =

French cycling race

Race details
- Date: July/September
- Region: France
- English name: Tour of the West
- Discipline: Road
- Type: Stage race

History
- First edition: 1911
- Editions: 24
- Final edition: 1959
- First winner: Théodule Pierre (FRA)
- Final winner: Joseph Morvan (FRA)

The Tour de l'Ouest (English: Tour of the West), also known as the Circuit de I'Ouest, was a road bicycle race held annually from 1911 to 1959 in France.

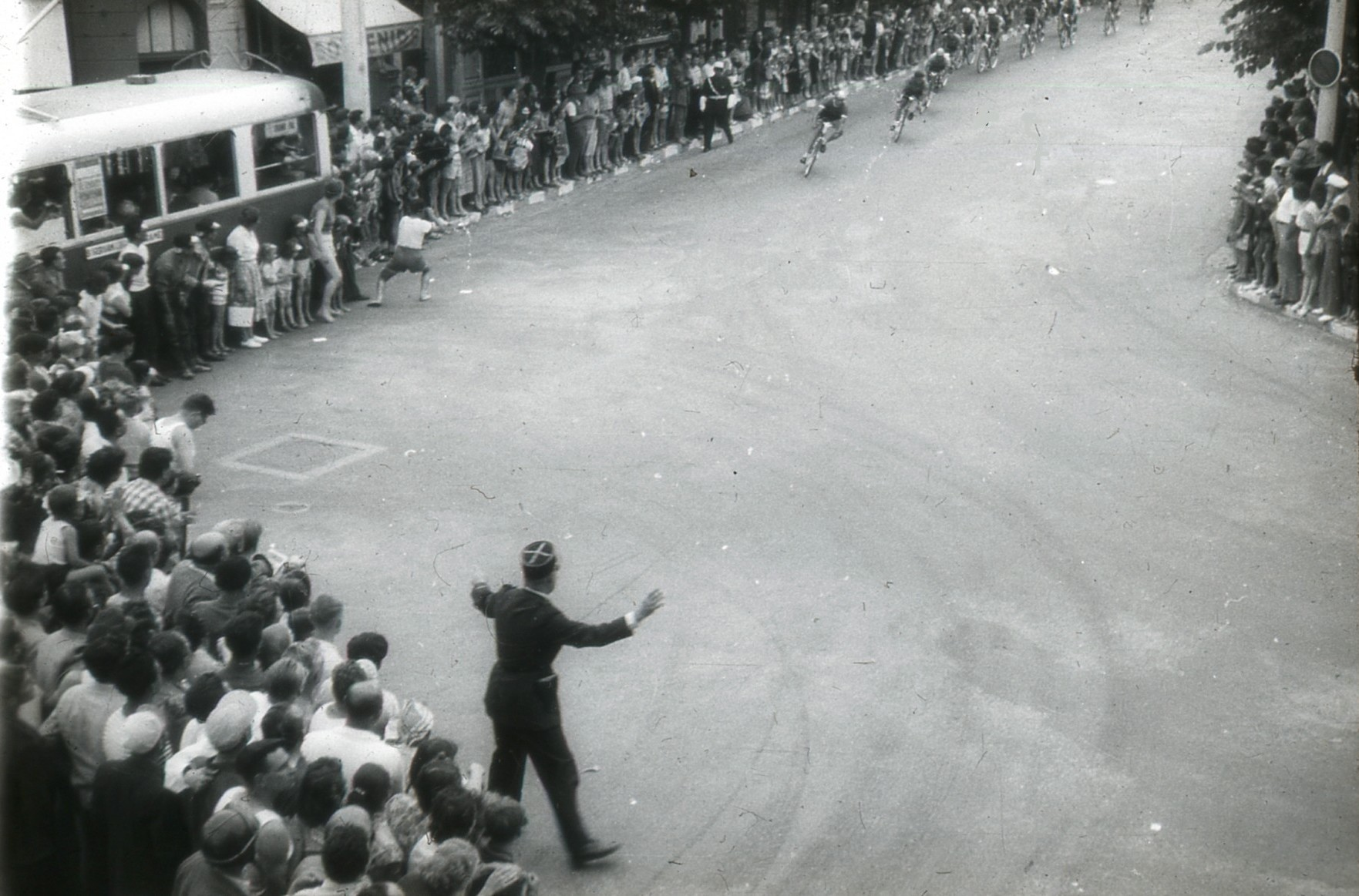
Riders passing in Saint-Malo during the 1958 Tour de l'Ouest.

== Winners ==
Year	Country	Rider	Team
1911	France	Théodule Pierre	
1931	France	Germain Nicot	Roold-Wolber
1932	Belgium	Emile Joly	Génial Lucifer-Hutchinson
1933	France	Romain Maes	Alcyon-Dunlop
1934	Belgium	Robert Wierinckx	Alcyon-Dunlop
1935	France	Robert Tanneveau	Armor
1936	France	Albertin Disseaux	Helyett
1937	France	Jean-Marie Goasmat	Essor-Hutchinson
1938	France	Paul Rossier	Peugeot-Dunlop
1939	Belgium	Briek Schotte	Mercier-Hutchinson
1946	France	Pierre Brambilla	Metropole-Dunlop
1947	France	Edouard Muller	Alcyon-Dunlop
1948	France	Albert Dubuisson	Rochet-Dunlop
1949	France	Louison Bobet	Bianchi-Ursus
1950	France	Attilio Redolfi	Mercier-Hutchinson
1951	Belgium	Rik Van Steenbergen	Condor
1952	France	Ugo Anzile	Peugeot-Dunlop
1953	France	Bruno Benuzzi	Stella-Wolber-Dunlop
1954	Belgium	André Vlayen	Alcyon-Dunlop
1955	Belgium	Marcel Janssens	Elvé-Peugeot
1956	France	Francis Pipelin	Mercier-BP-Hutchinson
1957	France	Pierre Gouget	Mercier-BP-Hutchinson
1958	France	Gilbert Scodeller	Saint-Raphael-Geminiani
1959	France	Joseph Morvan	Saint-Raphael-Geminiani
