= Didier Rous =

French cyclist

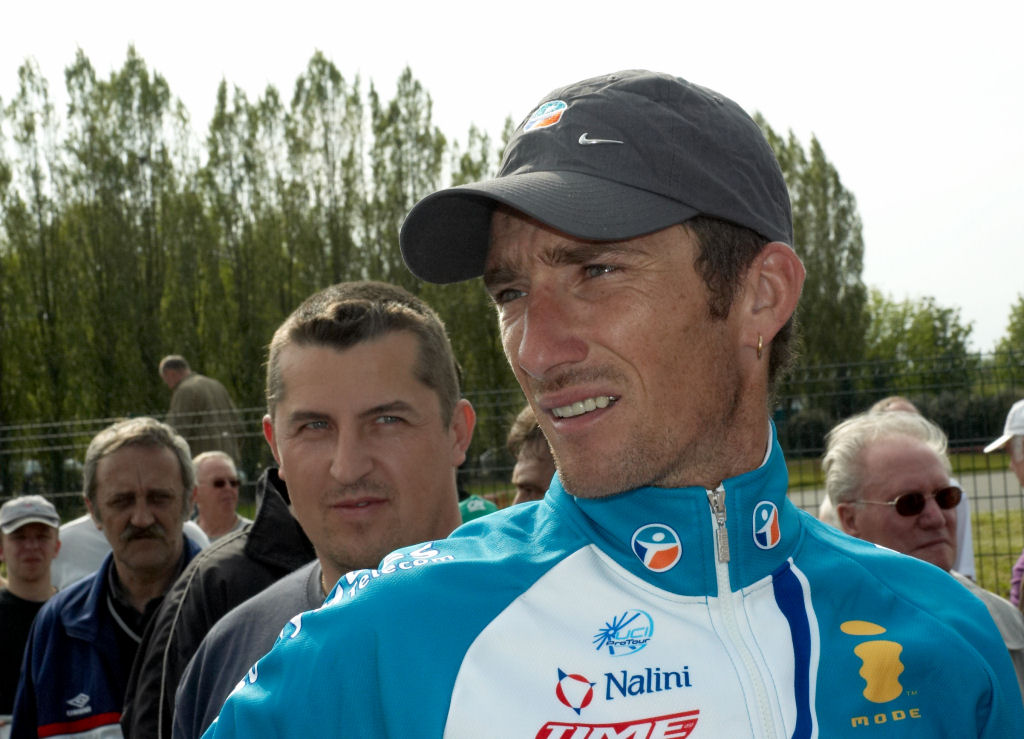
- Rous in 2006

Personal information
- Full name: Didier Rous
- Born: 18 September 1970 (age 56) Montauban, France
- Height: 1.82 m (5 ft 11 1/2 in)
- Weight: 70 kg (154 lb; 11 st 0 lb)

Cycling career
- Sport: Cycling
- Discipline: Road
- Role: Rider

Professional teams
- 1993–1996: GAN
- 1997–1999: Festina
- 2000–2007: Bouygues Télécom

Major wins
- Tour de France, 1 stages (1997); French National Road Race Champion (2001, 2003); Grand Prix du Midi Libre (2000)

Didier Rous (born 18 September 1970 in Montauban, France) is a French former professional road bicycle racer. He competed in the men's individual road race at the 1996 Summer Olympics.

== Biography ==
He started his professional career with Gan in 1993 before leaving for Festina in 1997, the year in which he won a stage of the Tour de France. In 1998 the Tour and in particular the Festina team were struck by a doping scandal which led to revelations that the team had organised a doping fund under the management of Bruno Roussel, the directeur sportif, and the team's doctor, Erik Rykaert. Rous said he had taken the blood enhancer, EPO.

In 2000 he joined a new team, Bonjour, sponsored by a newspaper chain and managed by the former rider Jean-René Bernaudeau. He stayed with Bernaudeau as the team's sponsors changed and ride under its new sponsor, Brioches La Boulangère (2003–2004) and then Bouygues Telecom (2005).

Rous said on 11 June 2007 that he was stopping racing because of health problems and joined the management of the Bouygues Telecom team.

== Major results ==
1993
1st, Grand Prix d'Ouverture La Marseillaise
1994
4th, Overall, Critérium du Dauphiné Libéré
1996
1st, Stage 4, Volta a la Comunitat Valenciana
1st, Stage 3 (ITT), Critérium International
2nd, La Flèche Wallonne
1997
1st, Stage 18, Tour de France
2000
1st, Overall, Grand Prix du Midi Libre
1st, Paris–Camembert
2001
(France) National Road Race Champion
Four Days of Dunkirk

1st, Overall, Stage 5 and 6 (ITT)

1st, Overall, Tour de Vendée
1st, Trophée des Grimpeurs
1st, Prologue, Critérium du Dauphiné Libéré
11th, Overall, Tour de France
2002
1st, Overall, Circuit de la Sarthe
2nd, Overall, Four Days of Dunkirk
2003
(France) National Road Race Champion
1st, Trophée des Grimpeurs
1st, Overall, Tour du Limousin
2nd, Overall, Four Days of Dunkirk
2004
1st, GP Ouest-France
1st, Stage 3, Four Days of Dunkirk
2005
1st, Stage 3 (ITT), Route du Sud
2006
Paris–Corrèze

1st, Overall, Points Competitions and Stage 1

1st, Trophée des Grimpeurs

== See also ==
- List of doping cases in cycling
- List of sportspeople sanctioned for doping offences
