= Midi Libre =

French daily newspaper

- Type: Daily newspaper
- Owner(s): Noel-Jean Bergeroux (Director, 2002)
- Publisher: Societe du Journal Midi Libre S.A.
- Editor-in-chief: Alian Plombat (2002)
- Founded: 1944
- Language: French
- Headquarters: 34923 Montpellier Cedex 9
- Circulation: 68,000 (2024)
- ISSN: 0397-2550
- OCLC number: 11968582
- Website: midilibre.fr

Midi Libre (French pronunciation: [midi libʁ]) is a French daily newspaper in Montpellier that covers general news. It began publication in 1944.

Since 1949, the newspaper has organised a cycling stage race, the Grand Prix du Midi Libre.

Circulation - source : ACPM
Year	2016	2017	2018	2019	2020
Circulation	105,592	101,423	95,757	87,932	84,865
