= Tour du Sud-Est =

Defunct professional cycle race

Race details
- Region: Southeast France
- Discipline: Road
- Competition: Super Prestige Pernod
- Type: Stage race

History
- First edition: 1919
- Editions: 26
- Final edition: 1983
- First winner: Alfred Steux (BEL)
- Most wins: 2 wins: Bernard Gauthier (FRA)
- Final winner: Jean-Marie Grezet (SUI)

The Tour du Sud-Est was a professional cycle race held as a stage race in France. It was first held in 1919 and held for the final time in 1983, although it wasn't held every year. In 1965 it was part of the Super Prestige Pernod series. The race was also known by different names in its history: Circuit de Provence (1919–1920), Circuit du Byrrh (1927–1929), Tour des Provinces du Sud-Est (1955–1957) and Circuit du Provençal (1964–1965).

== Winners ==
Year	Country	Rider	Team
1919	Belgium	Alfred Steux	
1920	France	Francis Pélissier	
1921–1923	No race		
1924	Italy	Alfredo Binda	
1925	France	André Villevieille	
1926	France	José Pelletier	
1927	France	Joseph Maurel	
1928	France	François Menta	
1929	France	Georges Cuvelier	
1930–1937	No race		
	France	Oreste Bernardoni	
1939	Italy	Nello Troggi	
1940–1949	No race		
1950	France	Marius Bonnet	
1951	France	Robert Bonnaventure	
1952	France	Bernard Gauthier	
1953	France	Roger Hassenforder	
1954	France	Jean Dacquay	
1955	Luxembourg	Charly Gaul	
1956	France	Jean Stablinski	
1957	France	Jean Graczyk	
1958	France	Bernard Gauthier	
1959	France	René Privat	
1960	Great Britain	Tom Simpson	
1961	No race		
1962	France	Gérard Thiélin	
1963	France	Jean-Claude Lebaube	
1964	France	Jean-Claude Annaert	
1965	Spain	Federico Bahamontes	
1966–1982	No race		
1983	Switzerland	Jean-Marie Grezet	
