= Grand Prix du Midi Libre =

Road cycling course in France

Race details
- Date: Before Tour de France
- Region: South France
- English name: Grand Prix du Midi Libre
- Local name: Grand Prix du Midi Libre (in French)
- Nickname: Midi Libre
- Discipline: Road
- Type: Stage race
- Organiser: Midi Libre

History
- First edition: 1949
- Editions: 55
- Final edition: 2004
- First winner: Henri Massal (FRA)
- Most wins: Jean-René Bernaudeau (FRA) (4 wins)
- Final winner: Christophe Moreau (FRA) (2004)

The Grand Prix du Midi Libre (referred to as just Midi Libre) was a multiple-stage road cycling course in the south of France. The race, named after the newspaper that organized it, was first organized in 1949 and was an important preparation courses for the Tour de France. Because of the hills in southern France, a climber usually won but sometimes the decision was made in a flat stage.

In 2003 the course was not organized, due to financial problems. One year later it returned, named Tour du Languedoc-Roussillon, but this turned out to be a one-time comeback.

== Winners ==
Year	Country	Rider	Team
1949	France	Henri Massal	
1950	France	Antonin Rolland	
1951	France	Raphaël Geminiani	
1952	Italy	Siro Bianchi	
1953	France	Pierre Nardi	
1954	Spain	Jesús Martínez	
1955	Spain	Miguel Poblet	
1956	France	Antonin Rolland	
1957	Luxembourg	Jempy Schmitz	
1958	France	Francis Pipelin	
1959	Belgium	Jean Brankart	
1960	France	Valentin Huot	
1961	France	Joseph Groussard	
1962	Netherlands	Mies Stolker	
1963	Spain	Fernando Manzaneque	
1964	France	André Foucher	
1965	France	André Foucher	
1966	France	Jean-Claude Theillière	
1967	France	Michel Grain	
1969	Spain	Luis Ocaña	
1970	Italy	Walter Ricci	
1971	Belgium	Eddy Merckx	
1972	France	Cyrille Guimard	
1973	France	Raymond Poulidor	
1974	France	Jean-Pierre Danguillaume	
1975	Italy	Francesco Moser	
1976	France	Alain Meslet	
1977	Italy	Wladimiro Panizza	
1978	Italy	Claudio Bortolotto	
1979	Italy	Giuseppe Saronni	
1980	France	Jean-René Bernaudeau	
1981	France	Jean-René Bernaudeau	
1982	France	Jean-René Bernaudeau	
1983	France	Jean-René Bernaudeau	
1984	France	Dominique Garde	
1985	Italy	Silvano Contini	
1986	Belgium	Claude Criquielion	
1987	France	Patrice Esnault	
1988	Belgium	Claude Criquielion	
1989	France	Jérôme Simon	
1990	France	Gérard Rué	
1991	France	Gilbert Duclos-Lassalle	
1992	France	Luc Leblanc	
1993	Italy	Maurizio Fondriest	
1994	Slovakia	Ján Svorada	
1995	Spain	Miguel Induráin	
1996	France	Laurent Jalabert	
1997	Italy	Alberto Elli	
1998	Switzerland	Laurent Dufaux	
1999	France	Benoît Salmon	
2000	France	Didier Rous	
2001	Spain	Iban Mayo	
2002	Result Void		
2003	No race		
2004	France	Christophe Moreau	
