= Morkhoven =

Village in Herentals, Antwerp, Belgium

- Village
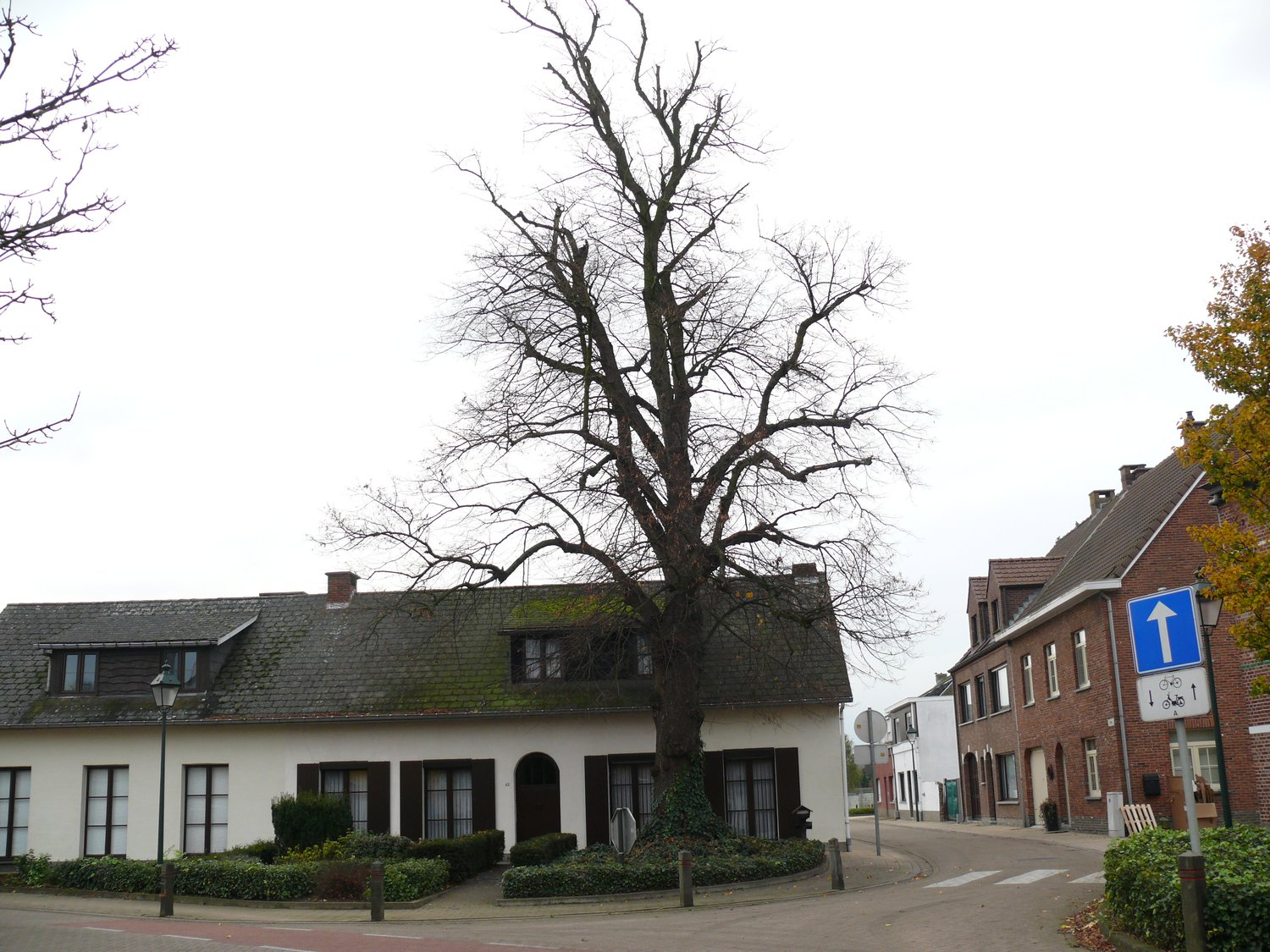
- The Freedom Tilia in Morkhoven (2007)

- Location in Belgium
- Coordinates: 51°07′N 4°49′E
- Country: Belgium
- Region: Flemish Region
- Province: Antwerp
- Municipality: Herentals

Area
  - Total: 5.23 km^{2} (2.02 sq mi)

Population (2021)
  - Total: 2,157
  - Density: 412/km^{2} (1,070/sq mi)
- Time zone: CET

Morkhoven (Dutch pronunciation: [ˈmɔr(ə)kˌɦoːvə(n)]) is a village in the Belgian province of Antwerp belonging to the municipality of Herentals. First documented in 1286, Morkhoven was historically linked to various noble families and was a rural settlement on the periphery of Herentals until it developed road connections with other villages in the 19th century. It has since become a primarily residential area. Morkhoven was incorporated into the municipality of Herentals in 1977.

A local landmark is the Freedom Tilia, believed to have been planted during the Brabant Revolution (1789–1790) or the Belgian Revolution (1830–1831).

As of 2021, the population of Morkhoven was 2,157.

== History ==
The village was first mentioned in 1286 as belonging to the Land of Geel. It was possibly part of the heerlijkheid (lordship) of Noorderwijk until the early 16th century. In 1506, Maximiliana van der Noot was recorded as being the Lady of Morkhoven; the lordship then passed to her son Jan van der Meeren in 1561 and subsequently, through marriage, to the families d'Ongnies and Coupigny by 1574. The Coupigny family was elevated to the rank of count in 1624.

By the mid-18th century, Morkhoven had passed through marriage to the counts of de Croÿ, and in 1778 to the family de Merode van Westerlo. The noble family van Leefdael also owned estates in Morkhoven from the 16th century onward. These holdings were periodically separated from or reunited with the lordship of Tielen-Gierle due to inheritance and marriage arrangements.

Originally a rural municipality on the periphery of Herentals, Morkhoven was gradually integrated into the regional road network during the 19th century. A highway connection was established with Noorderwijk and Wiekevorst in 1865, and with Herenthout and Tongerlo in 1875. Over time, Morkhoven evolved from a primarily agricultural community into a residential area.

In 1963, the Geelse Construction Company developed several social housing estates in Morkhoven, with architectural designs by M. Vangenechten, L. Lenière, and L. Matheve. The village nonetheless retained examples of characteristic residential architecture, including village and town houses from the 19th century and the early 20th century, particularly along Dorp and Molenstraat. Some historic farms have also been preserved, alongside newer residential buildings.

The municipality was merged into Herentals in 1977.

== Landmarks ==
The Freedom Tilia is a famous landmark in Morkhoven traditionally thought to have been planted during the Brabant Revolution (1789–1790). Historians now believe the original tree was destroyed in the chaotic years following the Brabant Revolution, and the current tree dates from the Belgian Revolution of 1830–1831, when Belgium became independent from the Netherlands.

== Demographics ==
As of 2021, 2,157 people lived in Morkhoven.

== Notable people ==
- Iris (born 1995), singer and Eurovision Song contestant.
- Joseph Verhaert (1927–1999), racing cyclist.
