= Four Days of Dunkirk =

French multi-day road cycling race

Race details
- Date: Early May
- Region: Nord-Pas de Calais, France
- English name: Four Days of Dunkirk
- Local name: Quatre Jours de Dunkerque (in French)
- Discipline: Road
- Competition: UCI ProSeries
- Type: Stage-race
- Web site: www.4joursdedunkerque.com

History
- First edition: 1955
- Editions: 68 (as of 2024)
- First winner: Louis Deprez (FRA)
- Most wins: Freddy Maertens (BEL) (4 wins)
- Most recent: Sam Bennett (IRL)

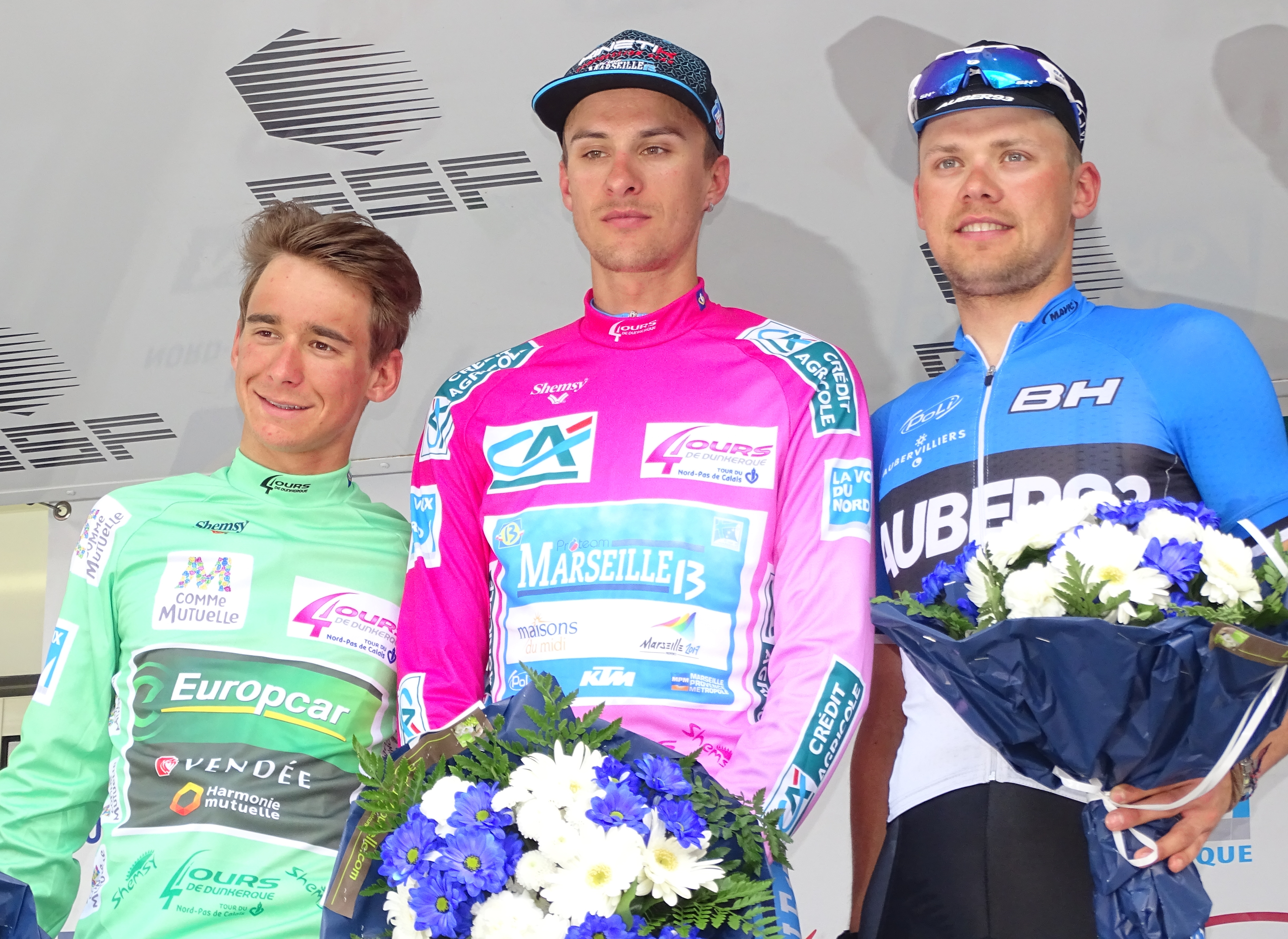
Winners in 2015

The Four Days of Dunkirk (French: Quatre Jours de Dunkerque) is a road bicycle race around the Nord-Pas de Calais region of northern France. Despite the name of the race, since the addition of an individual time trial in 1963, the race has been held over a 5 or 6 day period for most of its history. Since 2005, the race has been organised as a 2.HC event on the UCI Europe Tour. The race became part of the UCI ProSeries in 2020. Irish cyclist Sam Bennett won the most recent edition of the race.

== List of overall winners ==
Year	Country	Rider	Team
1955	France	Louis Déprez	Ryssel–Wolber
1956	Belgium	Jean Adriaensens	Mercier–BP–Hutchinson
1957	Belgium	Joseph Planckaert	Peugeot–Dunlop
1958	France	Jacques Anquetil	Helyett–Hutchinson
1959	France	Jacques Anquetil	Helyett–Fynsec
1960	Belgium	Joseph Planckaert	Wiel's–Flandria
1961	Netherlands	Ab Geldermans	Saint-Raphaël–R. Geminiani
1962	France	Joseph Groussard	Pelforth–Sauvage–Lejeune
1963	Belgium	Joseph Planckaert	Faema–Flandria
1964	Belgium	Gilbert Desmet	Wiel's–Groene Leeuw
1965	Belgium	Gustaaf De Smet	Wiel's–Groene Leeuw
1966	Belgium	Theo Mertens	Peugeot–BP–Michelin
1967	France	Lucien Aimar	Bic
1968	France	Jean Jourden	Frimatic–Wolber–De Gribaldy
1969	France	Alain Vasseur	Bic
1970	Belgium	Willy Van Neste	Mann–Grundig
1971	Belgium	Roger De Vlaeminck	Flandria–Mars
1972	France	Yves Hézard	Sonolor–Lejeune
1973	Belgium	Freddy Maertens	Flandria–Carpenter–Shimano
1974	Belgium	Walter Godefroot	Carpenter–Confortluxe–Flandria
1975	Belgium	Freddy Maertens	Carpenter–Confortluxe–Flandria
1976	Belgium	Freddy Maertens	Flandria–Velda–West Vlaams Vleesbedrijf
1977	Netherlands	Gerrie Knetemann	TI–Raleigh
1978	Belgium	Freddy Maertens	Flandria–Velda–Lano
1979	Belgium	Daniel Willems	IJsboerke–Warncke Eis
1980	Belgium	Jean-Luc Vandenbroucke	La Redoute–Motobécane
1981	Netherlands	Bert Oosterbosch	TI–Raleigh
1982	Belgium	Frank Hoste	TI–Raleigh
1983	Netherlands	Leo van Vliet	TI–Raleigh
1984	France	Bernard Hinault	La Vie Claire
1985	Belgium	Jean-Luc Vandenbroucke	La Redoute
1986	Belgium	Dirk De Wolf	Hitachi–Splendor
1987	Belgium	Herman Frison	Roland–Skala
1988	France	Pascal Poisson	Toshiba
1989	France	Charly Mottet	RMO
1990	Ireland	Stephen Roche	Histor–Sigma
1991	France	Charly Mottet	RMO
1992	Germany	Olaf Ludwig	Panasonic–Sportlife
1993	France	Laurent Desbiens	Castorama
1994	France	Eddy Seigneur	GAN
1995	Belgium	Johan Museeuw	Mapei–GB–Latexco
1996	France	Philippe Gaumont	GAN
1997	Belgium	Johan Museeuw	Mapei–GB
1998	Kazakhstan	Alexandre Vinokourov	Casino–Ag2r
1999	Denmark	Michael Sandstød	home–Jack & Jones
2000	Sweden	Martin Rittsel	Memory Card–Jack & Jones
2001	France	Didier Rous	Bonjour
2002	France	Sylvain Chavanel	Bonjour
2003	France	Christophe Moreau	Crédit Agricole
2004	France	Sylvain Chavanel	Brioches La Boulangère
2005	France	Pierrick Fédrigo	Bouygues Télécom
2006	Italy	Roberto Petito	Team Tenax-Salmilano
2007	France	Mathieu Ladagnous	Française des Jeux
2008	France	Stéphane Augé	Cofidis
2009	Portugal	Rui Costa	Caisse d'Epargne
2010	Switzerland	Martin Elmiger	Ag2r–La Mondiale
2011	France	Thomas Voeckler	Team Europcar
2012	France	Jimmy Engoulvent	Saur–Sojasun
2013	France	Arnaud Démare	FDJ
2014	France	Arnaud Démare	FDJ.fr
2015	Lithuania	Ignatas Konovalovas	Team Marseille 13 KTM
2016	France	Bryan Coquard	Direct Énergie
2017	France	Clément Venturini	Cofidis
2018	Belgium	Dimitri Claeys	Cofidis
2019	Netherlands	Mike Teunissen	Team Jumbo–Visma
2020	No race due to the COVID-19 pandemic.		
2021	No race due to the COVID-19 pandemic.		
2022	Belgium	Philippe Gilbert	Lotto–Soudal
2023	France	Romain Grégoire	Groupama–FDJ
2024	Ireland	Sam Bennett	Decathlon–AG2R La Mondiale
2025	Great Britain	Samuel Watson	Ineos Grenadiers

=== Multiple winners ===
Riders in italics are still active

Wins	Rider	Editions
4	Freddy Maertens (BEL)	1973, 1975, 1976, 1978
3	Jef Planckaert (BEL)	1957, 1960, 1963
2	Jacques Anquetil (FRA)	1958, 1959
2	Jean-Luc Vandenbroucke (BEL)	1980 + 1985
2	Charly Mottet (FRA)	1989 + 1991
2	Johan Museeuw (BEL)	1995 + 1997
2	Sylvain Chavanel (FRA)	2002 + 2004
2	Arnaud Démare (FRA)	2013 + 2014

=== Wins per country ===
Wins	Country
28	France
24	Belgium
5	Netherlands
2	Ireland
1	Denmark; United Kingdom; Germany; Italy; Kazakhstan; Lithuania; Portugal; Sweden; Switzerland
