= Raphael Glorieux =

Belgian cyclist

Personal information
- Born: 26 January 1929 Quévy-le-Petit, Belgium
- Died: 19 August 1986 (aged 57) Hainaut, Belgium

Cycling career
- Sport: Cycling

Raphael Glorieux (26 January 1929 – 19 August 1986) was a Belgian cyclist. He competed in the team pursuit event at the 1948 Summer Olympics.
