= Pierre Gouget =

French cyclist

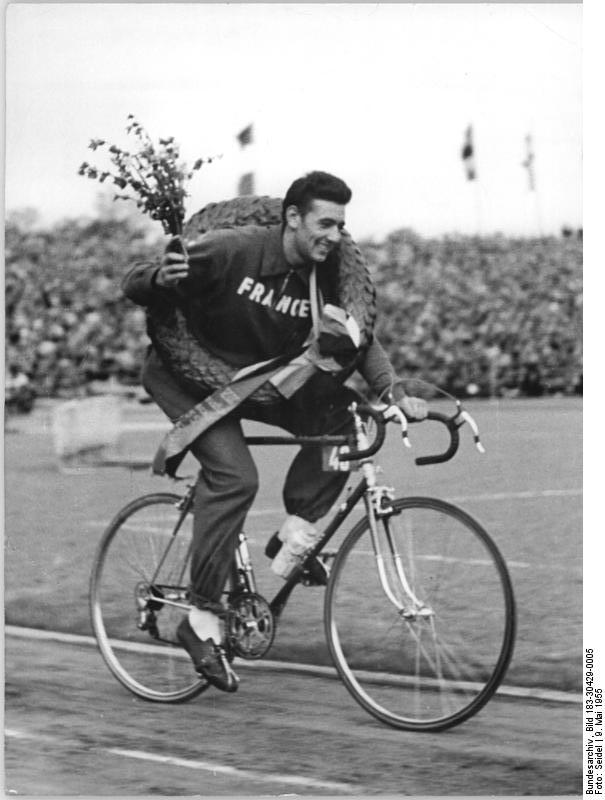
- Pierre Gouget in 1955

Personal information
- Born: 22 March 1932 Fleury sur Orne, France
- Died: 6 July 2003 (aged 71) Dijon, France

Sport
- Sport: Cycling
- Club: Mercier – BP

Pierre Gouget (22 March 1932 – 6 July 2003) was a French cyclist who specialized in road racing. In 1952 he finished second in the Tour de Paris. In 1955 he won one stage of the Peace Race. Next year he won the Tour de Normandie and Tour de l'Ouest. He retired in 1960.
