= Joseph Verhaert =

Belgian cyclist

Personal information
- Born: 6 September 1927 Morkhoven, Belgium
- Died: 19 December 1999 (aged 72) Morkhoven, Belgium

Cycling career
- Sport: Cycling
- Role: Rider

Joseph Verhaert (6 September 1927 – 19 December 1999) was a Belgian racing cyclist. He rode in the 1949 Tour de France.

== Top results ==
The following were Verhaert's best results:

- Grand Prix de Wallonie ('50)
- Circuit Hesbaye - Condroz ('49)
- Hoeilaart - Diest - Hoeilaart ('54)
- 5th Omloop Het Volk ('50)
- 8th La Flèche Wallonne ('50)
- 10th La Flèche Wallonne ('49)
- 5th Nationale Sluitingprijs Putte-Kapellen ('54)
- 2x 2nd stage Tour of Belgium ('51, '50)
- 7th GC Tour of Belgium ('50)
- 10th Scheldeprijs ('53)
