= Alfons Hellemans =

Belgian cyclist

Personal information
- Born: 7 August 1939 (age 87)

Cycling career
- Sport: Cycling
- Role: Rider

Alfons Hellemans (born 7 August 1939) is a Belgian racing cyclist. He rode in the 1963 Tour de France.
