= Louis Déprez =

French cyclist

Personal information
- Born: 6 January 1921 Lières, France
- Died: 27 July 1999 (aged 78) Lières, France

Cycling career
- Sport: Cycling
- Role: Rider

Louis Déprez (6 January 1921 – 27 July 1999) was a French racing cyclist. He rode in the 1947, 1948 and 1949 Tour de France. Déprez was the winner of initial Four Days of Dunkirk race in 1955.
