= Jean Anastasi =

French cyclist

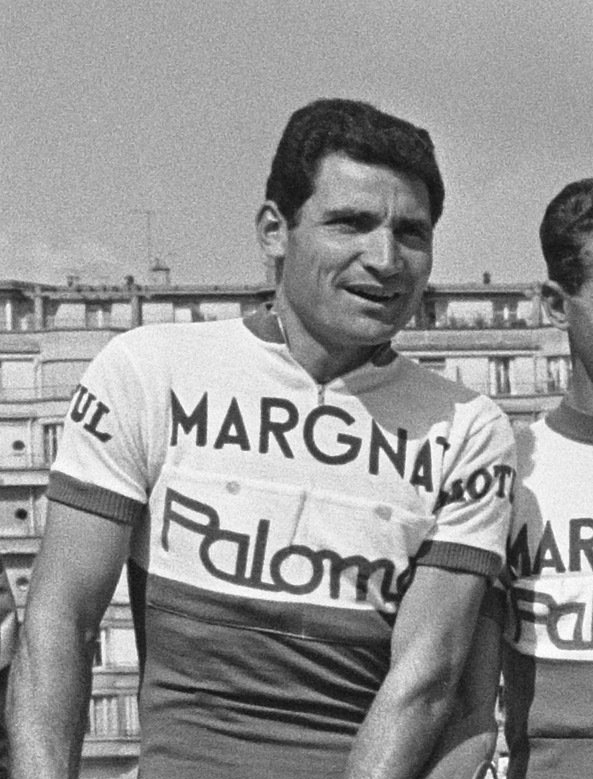
- Anastasi at the 1964 Tour de France

Personal information
- Born: 16 December 1935 (age 90) Marseille, France

Cycling career
- Sport: Cycling
- Role: Rider

Jean Anastasi (born 16 December 1935) is a French former professional racing cyclist. He rode in three editions of the Tour de France.
