= Roger Chupin =

French cyclist

Personal information
- Born: 3 September 1921 Avrillé, France
- Died: 12 November 2002 (aged 81) Paris, France

Cycling career
- Sport: Cycling
- Role: Rider

Roger Chupin (3 September 1921 – 12 November 2002) was a French racing cyclist. He rode in the 1948 Tour de France.
