= August Meuleman =

Belgian cyclist

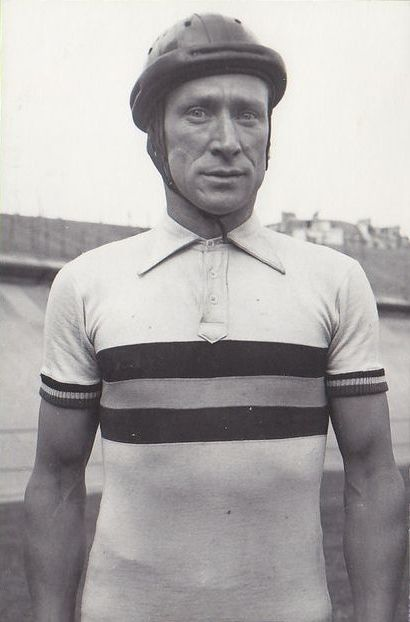
- Meuleman in 1948

Personal information
- Born: 20 October 1906 Ghent, Belgium
- Died: 12 February 2000 (aged 93) Soumagne, Belgium

Cycling career
- Sport: Cycling
- Discipline: Track
- Role: Rider
Medal record
Representing Belgium
UCI Motor-paced World Championships
Bronze medal – third place	1948 Amsterdam	Professionals

August Meuleman (20 October 1906 – 12 February 2000) was a Belgian cyclist. He competed in the team pursuit event at the 1928 Summer Olympics.
