= 1949 Critérium du Dauphiné Libéré =

Race details
- Dates: 2–7 June 1949
- Stages: 6
- Distance: 1,396 km (867 mi)
- Winning time: 42h 35' 46"

Results
	Winner	Lucien Lazaridès (FRA)	(France-Sport)
	Second	Jean Robic (FRA)	(Riva Sport)
	Third	Fermo Camellini (FRA)	(Riva Sport)
	Mountains	José Serra Gil (ESP)	(Spain)

The 1949 Critérium du Dauphiné Libéré was the third edition of the cycle race and was held from 2 June to 7 June 1949. The race started and finished in Grenoble. The race was won by Lucien Lazaridès of the France-Sport team.

== General classification ==
Final general classification

Rank	Rider	Team	Time
1	Lucien Lazaridès (FRA)	France-Sport	42h 35' 46"
2	Jean Robic (FRA)	Riva Sport	+ 7' 29"
3	Fermo Camellini (FRA)	Riva Sport	+ 8' 25"
4	Gino Sciardis (FRA)	Mercier–Hutchinson	+ 8' 41"
5	Raymond Impanis (BEL)	Alcyon–Dunlop	+ 9' 38"
6	Pierre Cogan (FRA)	Riva Sport	+ 11' 13"
7	Pierre Molinéris (FRA)	Red team	+ 17' 06"
8	Armand Baeyens (BEL)	Garin	+ 20' 49"
9	Roger Pontet (FRA)	Olympia	+ 22' 45"
10	Pierre Brambilla (FRA)	Metropole	+ 23' 30"
