= Robert Ducard =

French cyclist (1932–2021)

Personal information
- Born: 29 May 1932 Roanne, France
- Died: 8 April 2021 (aged 88)

Cycling career
- Sport: Cycling
- Role: Rider

Robert Ducard (29 May 1932 – 8 April 2021) was a French racing cyclist. He rode in the 1952 Tour de France. Ducard died on 8 April 2021, at the age of 88.
