= Jean Rey (cyclist) =

French cyclist (1925–1950)

Personal information
- Full name: Jean Rey
- Born: 29 May 1925 Toulouse, France
- Died: 13 November 1950 (aged 25) Montélimar, France

Cycling career
- Sport: Cycling
- Role: Rider

Jean Rey (French pronunciation: [ʒɑ̃ ʁɛ]; 29 May 1925 – 13 November 1950) was a French racing cyclist. He won the French national road race title in 1949. He also rode in the 1948 and 1949 Tour de France. He died in an automobile accident, along with good friend and fellow professional cyclist Jacques Moujica, when the driver of the car in which they were passengers lost control of the vehicle and crashed it into a disabled truck parked at the side of the road.
