= Gilbert Scodeller =

French cyclist

Personal information
- Born: 10 June 1931 Saint-Laurent-Blangy, France
- Died: 13 April 1989 (aged 57) Arras, France

Cycling career
- Sport: Cycling
- Role: Rider

Gilbert Scodeller (10 June 1931 – 13 April 1989) was a French professional racing cyclist. He rode in three editions of the Tour de France. He also finished in fourth place in the 1955 Paris–Roubaix.
