= Henri Van Kerckhove =

Belgian cyclist (1926–1999)

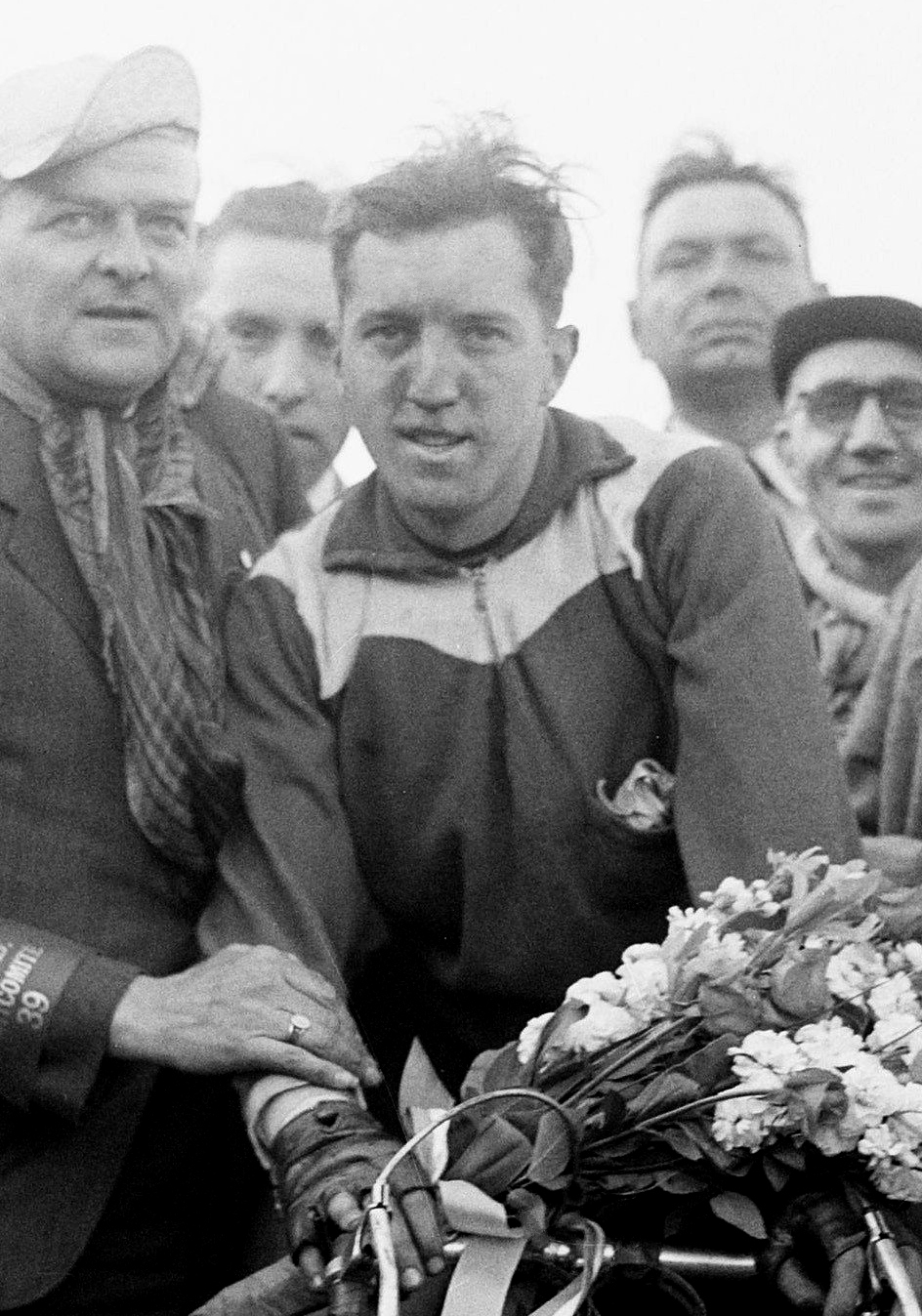
- Henri Van Kerckhove at the Ronde van Nederland 1949

Personal information
- Born: 6 September 1926 Brussels, Belgium
- Died: 4 November 1999 (aged 73) Leuven, Belgium

Sport
- Sport: Road cycling
Medal record
Representing Belgium
World championships
| Bronze medal – third place | 1946 Zürich | Road race, amateurs |

Henri Van Kerckhove (6 September 1926 – 4 November 1999) was a Belgian road cyclist who won a bronze medal at the 1946 World Championships. Next year he turned professional and won the Tour of Belgium in 1952 and 1954. He also rode the 1952 Tour de France and won individual stages of the Tour of Belgium (1948, 1949) and Ronde van Nederland (1949, 1952). His son Florent Van Kerckhove also became an elite road cyclist.
