= René Fournier =

French cyclist (1932–2023)

Personal information
- Born: 18 December 1932 Aulnay-sous-Bois, France
- Died: 23 August 2023 (aged 90) Villeneuve-sur-Lot, France

Cycling career
- Sport: Cycling
- Role: Rider

René Fournier (18 December 1932 – 26 August 2023) was a French professional racing cyclist. He rode in three editions of the Tour de France. Fournier died on 26 August 2023, at the age of 90.
