= Jean Bellay =

French cyclist

Personal information
- Born: 12 October 1930
- Died: 9 May 1989 (aged 58)

Cycling career
- Sport: Cycling
- Role: Rider

Jean Bellay (12 October 1930 – 9 May 1989) was a French racing cyclist. He rode in the 1954 Tour de France.
