= André Maelbrancke =

Belgian cyclist

- Maelbrancke in 1950

Personal information
- Full name: André Maelbrancke
- Born: 23 April 1918 Torhout, Belgium
- Died: 26 September 1986 (aged 68) Torhout, Belgium

Cycling career
- Sport: Cycling
- Role: Rider

André Maelbrancke (23 April 1918 – 26 September 1986) was a Belgian racing cyclist. He won the Belgian national road race title in 1942.
