= Bernard Gauthier =

French cyclist

Personal information
- Full name: Bernard Gauthier
- Nickname: Monsieur Bordeaux–Paris
- Born: 22 September 1924 Beaumont-Monteux, France
- Died: 23 November 2018 (aged 94) Grenoble, France

Cycling career
- Sport: Cycling
- Discipline: Road
- Role: Retired

Professional teams
- 1947: Follis-Dunlop
- 1948–1952: Mercier-Hutchinson
- 1952: Vicini
- 1954–1961: Mercier-Hutchinson

Major wins
- Bordeaux–Paris (4 times); 1 stage in Tour de France; French national road championship

Bernard Gauthier (22 September 1924 – 23 November 2018) was a French road racing cyclist, who was professional from 1947 to 1961. He won the Bordeaux–Paris road race on four occasions.

== Major results ==
1947
Circuit Lyonnais
Tour de France: 22nd place
1948
Tour de France: 24th place

Winner of stage 20

1950
Tour de France: 17th place

7 days in yellow jersey

1951
Bordeaux–Paris
Tour de France: 26th place
1952
Tour de France: 63rd place
Tour du Sud-Est
1953
GP du pneumatique
Montluçon
Tour de France: 75th place
1954
Bordeaux–Paris
Critérium du Dauphiné Libéré: 2 stages
GP Catox
1955
Tour de France: 46th place
Paris–Roubaix: 8th place
1956
(France) French national road race cycling championship
Bordeaux–Paris
Paris–Roubaix: 5th place
1957
Bordeaux–Paris
1958
Tour du Sud-Est
1960
Tour de France: 79th place
