= Jean Dacquay =

French cyclist (1927–2014)

Personal information
- Born: 17 December 1927 Cléguérec, France
- Died: 28 November 2014 (aged 86) Le Chesnay, France

Cycling career
- Sport: Cycling
- Role: Rider

Jean Dacquay (17 December 1927 – 28 November 2014) was a French racing cyclist. He rode in the 1953 Tour de France.
