= Karel De Baere =

Belgian cyclist

- De Baere in 1959

Personal information
- Born: 5 February 1925 Sint-Niklaas, Belgium
- Died: 9 October 1985 (aged 60) Sint-Niklaas, Belgium

Cycling career
- Sport: Cycling
- Role: Rider

Karel De Baere (5 February 1925 – 9 October 1985) was a Belgian professional racing cyclist. He won the Omloop Het Nieuwsblad in 1954.
