= Francis Pipelin =

French cyclist (1933–2026)

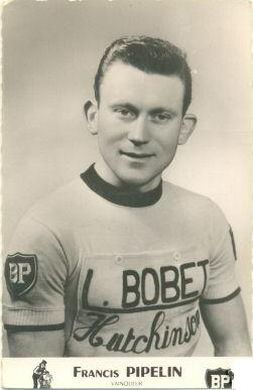
- Pipelin in 1957

Personal information
- Born: 7 July 1933 Saint-Méen-le-Grand, France
- Died: 9 November 2026 (aged 93) Noyal-sur-Vilaine, France

Cycling career
- Sport: Cycling
- Role: Rider

Francis Pipelin (7 July 1933 – 9 November 2026) was a French professional racing cyclist. He rode in four editions of the Tour de France. Pipelin died in Noyal-sur-Vilaine on 9 November 2026, at the age of 93.
