= List of teams and cyclists in the 1978 Tour de France =

List of cyclists

For the 1978 Tour de France, the following 11 teams each sent 10 cyclists, for a total of 110: Since the 1977 Tour de France, dominant riders as Eddy Merckx, Felice Gimondi, Raymond Poulidor and Luis Ocaña had retired.

Lucien Van Impe, the winner of 1976, had broken his collarbone and was still recovering.

The main contenders were debutant Hinault, who had won the 1978 Vuelta a España, and Joop Zoetemelk, who had already finished in second place for three times. Pre-race analysis judged Hinault better in the time trials, and Zoetemelk better in the mountains. Bernard Thévenet, the winner of the 1977 Tour de France, was out of form, and not considered a favourite.

== Teams ==
- Peugeot–Esso–Michelin
- TI–Raleigh–McGregor
- C&A
- Kas–Campagnolo
- Miko–Mercier–Vivagel
- Renault–Gitane–Campagnolo
- Teka
- Lejeune–BP
- Fiat
- Flandria–Velda–Lano
- Jobo–Spidel–La Roue d'Or

== Cyclists ==
Legend
No.	Starting number worn by the rider during the Tour
Pos.	Position in the general classification
DNF	Denotes a rider who did not finish

=== By starting number ===
No.	Name	Nationality	Team	Pos.	Ref
1	Bernard Thévenet	France	Peugeot–Esso–Michelin	DNF	
2	Bernard Bourreau	France	Peugeot–Esso–Michelin	28	
3	Jean-Pierre Danguillaume	France	Peugeot–Esso–Michelin	DNF	
4	Régis Delépine	France	Peugeot–Esso–Michelin	76	
5	Jacques Esclassan	France	Peugeot–Esso–Michelin	61	
6	Yves Hézard	France	Peugeot–Esso–Michelin	17	
7	Michel Laurent	France	Peugeot–Esso–Michelin	14	
8	Régis Ovion	France	Peugeot–Esso–Michelin	DNF	
9	Guy Sibille	France	Peugeot–Esso–Michelin	DNF	
10	Jean-Luc Vandenbroucke	Belgium	Peugeot–Esso–Michelin	64	
11	Hennie Kuiper	Netherlands	TI–Raleigh	DNF	
12	José De Cauwer	Belgium	TI–Raleigh	55	
13	Gerben Karstens	Netherlands	TI–Raleigh	DNF	
14	Gerrie Knetemann	Netherlands	TI–Raleigh	43	
15	Henk Lubberding	Netherlands	TI–Raleigh	8	
16	Jan Raas	Netherlands	TI–Raleigh	24	
17	Klaus-Peter Thaler	West Germany	TI–Raleigh	35	
18	Aad van den Hoek	Netherlands	TI–Raleigh	57	
19	Paul Wellens	Belgium	TI–Raleigh	6	
20	Wilfried Wesemael	Belgium	TI–Raleigh	47	
21	Lucien Van Impe	Belgium	C&A	9	
22	Joseph Bruyère	Belgium	C&A	4	
23	Jos Deschoenmaecker	Belgium	C&A	20	
24	René Dillen	Belgium	C&A	51	
25	Edward Janssens	Belgium	C&A	16	
26	Marcel Laurens	Belgium	C&A	60	
27	Ludo Loos	Belgium	C&A	DNF	
28	Jacques Martin	Belgium	C&A	DNF	
29	René Martens	Belgium	C&A	26	
30	Walter Planckaert	Belgium	C&A	DNF	
31	Francisco Galdós	Spain	Kas–Campagnolo	7	
32	Julián Andiano	Spain	Kas–Campagnolo	DNF	
33	José Enrique Cima	Spain	Kas–Campagnolo	DNF	
34	Faustino Fernández Ovies	Spain	Kas–Campagnolo	DNF	
35	Enrique Martínez Heredia	Spain	Kas–Campagnolo	DNF	
36	José Nazabal	Spain	Kas–Campagnolo	DNF	
37	José Pesarrodona	Spain	Kas–Campagnolo	DNF	
38	Juan Pujol	Spain	Kas–Campagnolo	32	
39	Sebastián Pozo	Spain	Kas–Campagnolo	DNF	
40	Jesús Suárez Cueva	Spain	Kas–Campagnolo	DNF	
41	Joop Zoetemelk	Netherlands	Miko–Mercier–Hutchinson	2	
42	Barry Hoban	Great Britain	Miko–Mercier–Hutchinson	65	
43	Maurice Le Guilloux	France	Miko–Mercier–Hutchinson	27	
44	Raymond Martin	France	Miko–Mercier–Hutchinson	12	
45	Hubert Mathis	France	Miko–Mercier–Hutchinson	45	
46	André Mollet	France	Miko–Mercier–Hutchinson	36	
47	Sven-Åke Nilsson	Sweden	Miko–Mercier–Hutchinson	11	
48	Patrick Perret	France	Miko–Mercier–Hutchinson	29	
49	Christian Seznec	France	Miko–Mercier–Hutchinson	5	
50	Charles Rouxel	France	Miko–Mercier–Hutchinson	33	
51	Bernard Hinault	France	Renault–Gitane–Campagnolo	1	
52	Jean-René Bernaudeau	France	Renault–Gitane–Campagnolo	DNF	
53	Yvon Bertin	France	Renault–Gitane–Campagnolo	74	
54	Jacques Bossis	France	Renault–Gitane–Campagnolo	62	
55	André Chalmel	France	Renault–Gitane–Campagnolo	63	
56	Gilbert Chaumaz	France	Renault–Gitane–Campagnolo	37	
57	Lucien Didier	Luxembourg	Renault–Gitane–Campagnolo	52	
58	Bernard Quilfen	France	Renault–Gitane–Campagnolo	58	
59	Willy Teirlinck	Belgium	Renault–Gitane–Campagnolo	38	
60	Pierre-Raymond Villemiane	France	Renault–Gitane–Campagnolo	31	
61	Pedro Torres	Spain	Teka	DNF	
62	Bernardo Alfonsel	Spain	Teka	46	
63	Javier Elorriaga	Spain	Teka	DNF	
64	Eulalio García	Spain	Teka	DNF	
65	Miguel María Lasa	Spain	Teka	41	
66	Paulino Martínez	Spain	Teka	DNF	
67	José Martíns	Portugal	Teka	22	
68	Antonio Menéndez	Spain	Teka	18	
69	Andrés Oliva	Spain	Teka	39	
70	Pedro Vilardebó	Spain	Teka	40	
71	Roger Legeay	France	Lejeune–BP	42	
72	Pierre Bazzo	France	Lejeune–BP	21	
73	Fedor den Hertog	Netherlands	Lejeune–BP	25	
74	Patrick Friou	France	Lejeune–BP	DNF	
75	Joël Gallopin	France	Lejeune–BP	DNF	
76	Jean-Louis Gauthier	France	Lejeune–BP	69	
77	Daniel Gisiger	Switzerland	Lejeune–BP	75	
78	Antoine Gutierrez	France	Lejeune–BP	DNF	
79	Michel Le Denmat	France	Lejeune–BP	DNF	
80	Eugène Plet	France	Lejeune–BP	66	
81	Jean-Jacques Fussien	France	Fiat–La France	73	
82	Serge Beucherie	France	Fiat–La France	67	
83	Alain Budet	France	Fiat–La France	71	
84	Alain De Carvalho	France	Fiat–La France	48	
85	Jacky Hardy	France	Fiat–La France	DNF	
86	Gilbert Le Lay	France	Fiat–La France	23	
87	Dominique Sanders	France	Fiat–La France	50	
88	Philippe Tesnière	France	Fiat–La France	78	
89	Didier Van Vlaslaer	France	Fiat–La France	DNF	
90	Paul Sherwen	Great Britain	Fiat–La France	70	
91	Freddy Maertens	Belgium	Velda–Lano–Flandria	13	
92	Michel Pollentier	Belgium	Velda–Lano–Flandria	DNF	
93	Joaquim Agostinho	Portugal	Velda–Lano–Flandria	3	
94	Herman Beysens	Belgium	Velda–Lano–Flandria	44	
95	René Bittinger	France	Velda–Lano–Flandria	19	
96	Marc Demeyer	Belgium	Velda–Lano–Flandria	49	
97	Sean Kelly	Ireland	Velda–Lano–Flandria	34	
98	Christian Muselet	France	Velda–Lano–Flandria	53	
99	Marcel Tinazzi	France	Velda–Lano–Flandria	59	
100	Albert Van Vlierberghe	Belgium	Velda–Lano–Flandria	56	
101	Mariano Martínez	France	Jobo–Superia	10	
102	Dino Bertolo	France	Jobo–Superia	72	
103	Jean-Pierre Biderre	France	Jobo–Superia	DNF	
104	Dante Coccolo	France	Jobo–Superia	77	
105	Philippe Durel	France	Jobo–Superia	68	
106	Hervé Inaudi	France	Jobo–Superia	DNF	
107	Ferdinand Julien	France	Jobo–Superia	30	
108	Alain Patritti	France	Jobo–Superia	54	
109	Jean-François Pescheux	France	Jobo–Superia	DNF	
110	André Romero	France	Jobo–Superia	15	

=== By team ===
Peugeot–Esso–Michelin
No.	Rider	Pos.
1	Bernard Thévenet (FRA)	DNF
2	Bernard Bourreau (FRA)	28
3	Jean-Pierre Danguillaume (FRA)	DNF
4	Régis Delépine (FRA)	76
5	Jacques Esclassan (FRA)	61
6	Yves Hézard (FRA)	17
7	Michel Laurent (FRA)	14
8	Régis Ovion (FRA)	DNF
9	Guy Sibille (FRA)	DNF
10	Jean-Luc Vandenbroucke (BEL)	64

TI–Raleigh
No.	Rider	Pos.
11	Hennie Kuiper (NED)	DNF
12	José De Cauwer (BEL)	55
13	Gerben Karstens (NED)	DNF
14	Gerrie Knetemann (NED)	43
15	Henk Lubberding (NED)	8
16	Jan Raas (NED)	24
17	Klaus-Peter Thaler (FRG)	35
18	Aad van den Hoek (NED)	57
19	Paul Wellens (BEL)	6
20	Wilfried Wesemael (BEL)	47

C&A
No.	Rider	Pos.
21	Lucien Van Impe (BEL)	9
22	Joseph Bruyère (BEL)	4
23	Jos Deschoenmaecker (BEL)	20
24	René Dillen (BEL)	51
25	Edward Janssens (BEL)	16
26	Marcel Laurens (BEL)	60
27	Ludo Loos (BEL)	DNF
28	Jacques Martin (BEL)	DNF
29	René Martens (BEL)	26
30	Walter Planckaert (BEL)	DNF

Kas–Campagnolo
No.	Rider	Pos.
31	Francisco Galdós (ESP)	7
32	Julián Andiano (ESP)	DNF
33	José Enrique Cima (ESP)	DNF
34	Faustino Fernández Ovies (ESP)	DNF
35	Enrique Martínez Heredia (ESP)	DNF
36	José Nazabal (ESP)	DNF
37	José Pesarrodona (ESP)	DNF
38	Juan Pujol (ESP)	32
39	Sebastián Pozo (ESP)	DNF
40	Jesús Suárez Cueva (ESP)	DNF

Miko–Mercier–Hutchinson
No.	Rider	Pos.
41	Joop Zoetemelk (NED)	2
42	Barry Hoban (GBR)	65
43	Maurice Le Guilloux (FRA)	27
44	Raymond Martin (FRA)	12
45	Hubert Mathis (FRA)	45
46	André Mollet (FRA)	36
47	Sven-Åke Nilsson (SWE)	11
48	Patrick Perret (FRA)	29
49	Christian Seznec (FRA)	5
50	Charles Rouxel (FRA)	33

Renault–Gitane–Campagnolo
No.	Rider	Pos.
51	Bernard Hinault (FRA)	1
52	Jean-René Bernaudeau (FRA)	DNF
53	Yvon Bertin (FRA)	74
54	Jacques Bossis (FRA)	62
55	André Chalmel (FRA)	63
56	Gilbert Chaumaz (FRA)	37
57	Lucien Didier (LUX)	52
58	Bernard Quilfen (FRA)	58
59	Willy Teirlinck (BEL)	38
60	Pierre-Raymond Villemiane (FRA)	31

Teka
No.	Rider	Pos.
61	Pedro Torres (ESP)	DNF
62	Bernardo Alfonsel (ESP)	46
63	Javier Elorriaga (ESP)	DNF
64	Eulalio García (ESP)	DNF
65	Miguel María Lasa (ESP)	41
66	Paulino Martínez (ESP)	DNF
67	José Martíns (POR)	22
68	Antonio Menéndez (ESP)	18
69	Andrés Oliva (ESP)	39
70	Pedro Vilardebó (ESP)	40

Lejeune–BP
No.	Rider	Pos.
71	Roger Legeay (FRA)	42
72	Pierre Bazzo (FRA)	21
73	Fedor den Hertog (NED)	25
74	Patrick Friou (FRA)	DNF
75	Joël Gallopin (FRA)	DNF
76	Jean-Louis Gauthier (FRA)	69
77	Daniel Gisiger (SUI)	75
78	Antoine Gutierrez (FRA)	DNF
79	Michel Le Denmat (FRA)	DNF
80	Eugène Plet (FRA)	66

Fiat–La France
No.	Rider	Pos.
81	Jean-Jacques Fussien (FRA)	73
82	Serge Beucherie (FRA)	67
83	Alain Budet (FRA)	71
84	Alain De Carvalho (FRA)	48
85	Jacky Hardy (FRA)	DNF
86	Gilbert Lelay (FRA)	23
87	Dominique Sanders (FRA)	50
88	Philippe Tesnière (FRA)	78
89	Didier Van Vlaslaer (FRA)	DNF
90	Paul Sherwen (GBR)	70

Velda–Lano–Flandria
No.	Rider	Pos.
91	Freddy Maertens (BEL)	13
92	Michel Pollentier (BEL)	DNF
93	Joaquim Agostinho (POR)	3
94	Herman Beysens (BEL)	44
95	René Bittinger (FRA)	19
96	Marc Demeyer (BEL)	49
97	Sean Kelly (IRL)	34
98	Christian Muselet (FRA)	53
99	Marcel Tinazzi (FRA)	59
100	Albert Van Vlierberghe (BEL)	56

Jobo–Superia
No.	Rider	Pos.
101	Mariano Martínez (FRA)	10
102	Dino Bertolo (FRA)	72
103	Jean-Pierre Biderre (FRA)	DNF
104	Dante Coccolo (FRA)	77
105	Philippe Durel (FRA)	68
106	Hervé Inaudi (FRA)	DNF
107	Ferdinand Julien (FRA)	30
108	Alain Patritti (FRA)	54
109	Jean-François Pescheux (FRA)	DNF
110	André Romero (FRA)	15
