= List of teams and cyclists in the 1978 Vuelta a España =

For the 1978 Vuelta a España, the field consisted of 99 riders; 64 finished the race.

== By rider ==
Legend
| No. | Starting number worn by the rider during the Vuelta |
| Pos. | Position in the general classification |
| Time | Deficit to the winner of the general classification |
| DNF | Denotes a rider who did not finish |

| No. | Name | Nationality | Team | Pos. | Time | Ref |
|---|---|---|---|---|---|---|
| 1 | José Antonio González | Spain | Kas | 30 | + 43' 50" | |
| 2 | Domingo Perurena | Spain | Kas | 22 | + 28' 55" | |
| 3 | Vicente López Carril | Spain | Kas | 10 | + 13' 57" | |
| 4 | José Enrique Cima | Spain | Kas | 17 | + 21' 54" | |
| 5 | José Nazabal | Spain | Kas | 7 | + 6' 12" | |
| 6 | Enrique Martínez Heredia | Spain | Kas | 8 | + 6' 53" | |
| 7 | José Viejo | Spain | Kas | DNF | — | |
| 8 | Sebastián Pozo | Spain | Kas | 12 | + 16' 48" | |
| 9 | Jesús Suárez Cueva | Spain | Kas | DNF | — | |
| 10 | José Pesarrodona | Spain | Kas | 2 | + 3' 02" | |
| 12 | Eddy Van den Broeck | Belgium | Old Lord's–Splendor | DNF | — | |
| 13 | Maurizio Bellet | Italy | Old Lord's–Splendor | 43 | + 1h 03' 24" | |
| 14 | Willy Scheers | Belgium | Old Lord's–Splendor | 63 | + 2h 39' 18" | |
| 15 | Alan McCormack | Ireland | Old Lord's–Splendor | 55 | + 1h 44' 44" | |
| 16 | Wim Schroyens | Belgium | Old Lord's–Splendor | DNF | — | |
| 17 | Johnny Vanderveken | Belgium | Old Lord's–Splendor | DNF | — | |
| 18 | Bernard Draux | Belgium | Old Lord's–Splendor | DNF | — | |
| 19 | Giovanni Jiménez Ocampo | Colombia | Old Lord's–Splendor | DNF | — | |
| 20 | Walter Dalgal | Italy | Old Lord's–Splendor | DNF | — | |
| 21 | José Manuel García Rodríguez | Spain | Transmallorca–Gios | DNF | — | |
| 22 | Roque Moya | Spain | Transmallorca–Gios | DNF | — | |
| 23 | Luis Alberto Ordiales | Spain | Transmallorca–Gios | 39 | + 58' 42" | |
| 24 | Antonio González Rodríguez | Spain | Transmallorca–Gios | 26 | + 37' 11" | |
| 25 | Carlos Ocaña Crespo | Spain | Transmallorca–Gios | 33 | + 52' 30" | |
| 26 | Daniele Tinchella | Italy | Transmallorca–Gios | 40 | + 59' 43" | |
| 27 | Vicente Belda | Spain | Transmallorca–Gios | 21 | + 27' 23" | |
| 28 | Ramón Vila Tamarit | Spain | Transmallorca–Gios | DNF | — | |
| 29 | Blas Domingo Llido | Spain | Transmallorca–Gios | DNF | — | |
| 30 | Fernando Benejam | Spain | Transmallorca–Gios | DNF | — | |
| 31 | Bernard Hinault | France | Renault–Gitane | 1 | 85h 24' 14" | |
| 32 | Willy Teirlinck | Belgium | Renault–Gitane | 25 | + 33' 20" | |
| 33 | Roland Berland | France | Renault–Gitane | 44 | + 1h 04' 46" | |
| 34 | Gilbert Chaumaz | France | Renault–Gitane | 15 | + 20' 57" | |
| 35 | Bernard Quilfen | France | Renault–Gitane | 46 | + 1h 09' 35" | |
| 36 | Lucien Didier | Luxembourg | Renault–Gitane | 38 | + 58' 16" | |
| 37 | Bernard Becaas | France | Renault–Gitane | 36 | + 54' 47" | |
| 38 | Patrick Cluzaud | France | Renault–Gitane | 50 | + 1h 28' 20" | |
| 39 | André Chalmel | France | Renault–Gitane | 47 | + 1h 15' 38" | |
| 40 | Jean-René Bernaudeau | France | Renault–Gitane | 3 | + 3' 47" | |
| 41 | Cees Bal | Netherlands | Bode Deuren–Shimano | DNF | — | |
| 42 | Nidi den Hertog | Netherlands | Bode Deuren–Shimano | DNF | — | |
| 43 | Fridolin Keller | Switzerland | Bode Deuren–Shimano | DNF | — | |
| 44 | Adrianus Prinsen | Netherlands | Bode Deuren–Shimano | DNF | — | |
| 45 | Ronald Bouckaert | Belgium | Bode Deuren–Shimano | DNF | — | |
| 46 | Serge Demierre | Switzerland | Bode Deuren–Shimano | DNF | — | |
| 47 | Jan Breur | Netherlands | Bode Deuren–Shimano | DNF | — | |
| 48 | Horst Schütz | West Germany | Bode Deuren–Shimano | DNF | — | |
| 49 | Co Moritz | Netherlands | Bode Deuren–Shimano | DNF | — | |
| 50 | Roelof Groen | Netherlands | Bode Deuren–Shimano | 62 | + 2h 07' 48" | |
| 51 | Antonio Abad Collado | Spain | Novostil–Helios | 56 | + 1h 46' 55" | |
| 52 | Andrés Gandarias | Spain | Novostil–Helios | 16 | + 21' 30" | |
| 53 | Custódio Mazuela Castillo | Spain | Novostil–Helios | 29 | + 42' 38" | |
| 54 | Gonzalo Aja | Spain | Novostil–Helios | 9 | + 10' 12" | |
| 55 | Isidro Juárez | Spain | Novostil–Helios | DNF | — | |
| 56 | Anastasio Greciano | Spain | Novostil–Helios | 32 | + 49' 00" | |
| 57 | Alberto Fernández | Spain | Novostil–Helios | 19 | + 24' 04" | |
| 58 | Ángel López del Álamo | Spain | Novostil–Helios | 41 | + 1h 00' 30" | |
| 59 | Félix Suárez Colomo | Spain | Novostil–Helios | DNF | — | |
| 60 | Feliciano Sobradillo Casado | Spain | Novostil–Helios | 45 | + 1h 07' 46" | |
| 61 | Ferdi Van Den Haute | Belgium | Marc–Zeepcentrale–Superia | 6 | + 5' 52" | |
| 62 | Luc Leman | Belgium | Marc–Zeepcentrale–Superia | DNF | — | |
| 63 | Jos Schipper | Netherlands | Marc–Zeepcentrale–Superia | 5 | + 4' 23" | |
| 64 | Fons van Katwijk | Netherlands | Marc–Zeepcentrale–Superia | 54 | + 1h 43' 40" | |
| 65 | André Delcroix | Belgium | Marc–Zeepcentrale–Superia | 59 | + 1h 55' 31" | |
| 66 | Patrick Lefevere | Belgium | Marc–Zeepcentrale–Superia | 53 | + 1h 38' 42" | |
| 67 | Marc Dierickx | Belgium | Marc–Zeepcentrale–Superia | 57 | + 1h 49' 00" | |
| 68 | Geert Malfait | Belgium | Marc–Zeepcentrale–Superia | DNF | — | |
| 69 | Carlos Cuyle | Belgium | Marc–Zeepcentrale–Superia | DNF | — | |
| 70 | Ronan De Meyer | Belgium | Marc–Zeepcentrale–Superia | DNF | — | |
| 71 | Benny Schepmans | Belgium | Safir–Beyers–Ludo | 51 | + 1h 34' 50" | |
| 72 | Hendrik Vandenbrande | Netherlands | Safir–Beyers–Ludo | 35 | + 54' 06" | |
| 73 | Peter Deneef | Belgium | Safir–Beyers–Ludo | DNF | — | |
| 74 | Willy Sprangers | Belgium | Safir–Beyers–Ludo | 58 | + 1h 54' 39" | |
| 75 | Marc De Smet | Belgium | Safir–Beyers–Ludo | DNF | — | |
| 76 | Leo Van Thielen | Belgium | Safir–Beyers–Ludo | DNF | — | |
| 77 | Luc Berkenbosch | Belgium | Safir–Beyers–Ludo | DNF | — | |
| 78 | Geert Matheussen | Belgium | Safir–Beyers–Ludo | DNF | — | |
| 79 | René Wuyckens | Belgium | Safir–Beyers–Ludo | 64 | + 2h 40' 40" | |
| 80 | Jean-Philippe Vandenbrande | Belgium | Safir–Beyers–Ludo | 28 | + 41' 00" | |
| 81 | Giuseppe Walter Passuello | Italy | Italy | 37 | + 55' 18" | |
| 82 | Franco Conti | Italy | Italy | 31 | + 44' 53" | |
| 83 | Annunzio Colombo | Italy | Italy | 34 | + 53' 06" | |
| 84 | Tullio Rossi | Italy | Italy | 61 | + 2h 01' 15" | |
| 85 | Salvatore Maccali | Italy | Italy | 49 | + 1h 22' 35" | |
| 86 | Ignazio Palean | Italy | Italy | 52 | + 1h 36' 27" | |
| 87 | Roberto Sorlini | Italy | Italy | 60 | + 1h 56' 48" | |
| 88 | Cesare Cipollini | Italy | Italy | DNF | — | |
| 89 | Leone Pizzini | Italy | Italy | 48 | + 1h 19' 10" | |
| 90 | Antonio Bonini | Italy | Italy | DNF | — | |
| 91 | Carlos Melero | Spain | Teka | 42 | + 1h 03' 00" | |
| 92 | José Luis Mayoz Aizpurua | Spain | Teka | 18 | + 22' 55" | |
| 93 | Félix Pérez Moreno | Spain | Teka | 23 | + 32' 53" | |
| 94 | Andrés Oliva | Spain | Teka | 11 | + 14' 39" | |
| 95 | Francisco Fernández Moreno | Spain | Teka | 24 | + 33' 19" | |
| 96 | Bernardo Alfonsel | Spain | Teka | 13 | + 20' 18" | |
| 97 | Manuel Esparza | Spain | Teka | 14 | + 20' 43" | |
| 98 | José Freitas Martins | Portugal | Teka | 20 | + 24' 41" | |
| 99 | Francisco Elorriaga | Spain | Teka | 27 | + 39' 10" | |
| 100 | Eulalio García | Spain | Teka | 4 | + 4' 28" | |
