= 1978 Vuelta a España, Stage 11a to Stage 19b =

Cycling race stages

The 1978 Vuelta a España was the 33rd edition of the Vuelta a España, one of cycling's Grand Tours. The Vuelta began in Gijón, with a prologue individual time trial on 25 April, and Stage 10 occurred on 6 May with a stage from Calafell. The race finished in San Sebastián on 14 May.

== Stage 11a ==
6 May 1978 — Calafell to Barcelona, 67 km (42 mi)

Stage 11a result

Rank	Rider	Team	Time
1	Francisco Elorriaga (ESP)	Teka	1h 26' 09"
2	Daniele Tinchella (ITA)	Transmallorca-Gios	s.t.
3	Eulalio García (ESP)	Teka	s.t.
4	Benny Schepmans (BEL)	Safir–Beyers–Ludo	s.t.
5	Jesús Suárez Cueva (ESP)	Kas–Campagnolo	s.t.
6	Ignazio Paleari (ITA)	Italy	s.t.
7	José Viejo (ESP)	Kas–Campagnolo	s.t.
8	Willy Teirlinck (BEL)	Renault–Gitane–Campagnolo	s.t.
9	Manuel Esparza (ESP)	Teka	s.t.
10	Marc Dierickx (BEL)	Marc Zeepcentrale–Superia	s.t.

General classification after Stage 11a

Rank	Rider	Team	Time
1	Ferdi Van Den Haute (BEL)	Marc Zeepcentrale–Superia	
2	José Pesarrodona (ESP)	Kas–Campagnolo	+ 39"
3	Bernard Hinault (FRA)	Renault–Gitane–Campagnolo	+ 1' 01"

== Stage 11b ==
6 May 1978 — Barcelona to Barcelona, 3.8 km (2.4 mi) (ITT)

Stage 11b result

Rank	Rider	Team	Time
1	Bernard Hinault (FRA)	Renault–Gitane–Campagnolo	4' 57"
2	Ferdi Van Den Haute (BEL)	Marc Zeepcentrale–Superia	+ 3"
3	Eulalio García (ESP)	Teka	+ 5"
4	Enrique Martínez Heredia (ESP)	Kas–Campagnolo	+ 8"
5	Jos Schipper (NED)	Marc Zeepcentrale–Superia	s.t.
6	José Pesarrodona (ESP)	Kas–Campagnolo	s.t.
7	José Viejo (ESP)	Kas–Campagnolo	+ 9"
8	José Manuel García Rodríguez (ESP)	Transmallorca-Gios	s.t.
9	José Enrique Cima (ESP)	Kas–Campagnolo	+ 10"
10	Francisco Elorriaga (ESP)	Teka	+ 14"

General classification after Stage 11b

Rank	Rider	Team	Time
1	Ferdi Van Den Haute (BEL)	Marc Zeepcentrale–Superia	44h 03' 23"
2	José Pesarrodona (ESP)	Kas–Campagnolo	+ 47"
3	Bernard Hinault (FRA)	Renault–Gitane–Campagnolo	+ 55"
4	Enrique Martínez Heredia (ESP)	Kas–Campagnolo	+ 1' 09"
5	Jean-René Bernaudeau (FRA)	Renault–Gitane–Campagnolo	+ 1' 34"
6	José Viejo (ESP)	Kas–Campagnolo	s.t.
7	Jos Schipper (NED)	Marc Zeepcentrale–Superia	+ 1' 39"
8	Eulalio García (ESP)	Teka	+ 2' 14"
9	Franco Conti (ITA)	Italy	+ 2' 26"
10	José Antonio González (ESP)	Kas–Campagnolo	s.t.

== Stage 12 ==
7 May 1978 — Bellaterra (Cerdanyola del Vallès) to La Tossa de Montbui (Santa Margarida de Montbui), 205 km (127 mi)

Stage 12 result

Rank	Rider	Team	Time
1	Bernard Hinault (FRA)	Renault–Gitane–Campagnolo	5h 54' 14"
2	Manuel Esparza (ESP)	Teka	s.t.
3	José Enrique Cima (ESP)	Kas–Campagnolo	+ 2"
4	Vicente Belda (ESP)	Transmallorca-Gios	s.t.
5	José Pesarrodona (ESP)	Kas–Campagnolo	s.t.
6	Eulalio García (ESP)	Teka	+ 4"
7	Gonzalo Aja (ESP)	Novostil-Helios	+ 9"
8	José Manuel García Rodríguez (ESP)	Transmallorca-Gios	+ 11"
9	Jean-René Bernaudeau (FRA)	Renault–Gitane–Campagnolo	s.t.
10	Vicente López Carril (ESP)	Kas–Campagnolo	+ 24"

General classification after Stage 12

Rank	Rider	Team	Time
1	Bernard Hinault (FRA)	Renault–Gitane–Campagnolo	49h 58' 48"
2	José Pesarrodona (ESP)	Kas–Campagnolo	+ 8"
3	Jean-René Bernaudeau (FRA)	Renault–Gitane–Campagnolo	+ 53"
4	Jos Schipper (NED)	Marc Zeepcentrale–Superia	+ 1' 34"
5	Eulalio García (ESP)	Teka	+ 1' 37"
6	Manuel Esparza (ESP)	Teka	+ 1' 48"
7	Vicente López Carril (ESP)	Kas–Campagnolo	+ 2' 40"
8	Gonzalo Aja (ESP)	Kas–Campagnolo	+ 2' 41"
9	Ferdi Van Den Haute (BEL)	Marc Zeepcentrale–Superia	+ 3' 15"
10	Andrés Oliva (ESP)	Teka	+ 3' 22"

== Stage 13 ==
8 May 1978 — Igualada to Jaca, 243 km (151 mi)

Stage 13 result

Rank	Rider	Team	Time
1	Salvatore Maccali (ITA)	Italy	8' 20"
2	Sebastián Pozo (ESP)	Kas–Campagnolo	+ 4"
3	Jesús Suárez Cueva (ESP)	Kas–Campagnolo	s.t.
4	Willy Teirlinck (BEL)	Renault–Gitane–Campagnolo	s.t.
5	Daniele Tinchella (ITA)	Transmallorca-Gios	+ 7"
6	Bernard Hinault (FRA)	Renault–Gitane–Campagnolo	+ 9"
7	Tullio Rossi (ITA)	Italy	s.t.
8	Fons van Katwijk (NED)	Marc Zeepcentrale–Superia	s.t.
9	Ferdi Van Den Haute (BEL)	Marc Zeepcentrale–Superia	s.t.
10	Jean-Philippe Vandenbrande (BEL)	Safir–Beyers–Ludo	s.t.

General classification after Stage 13

Rank	Rider	Team	Time
1	Bernard Hinault (FRA)	Renault–Gitane–Campagnolo	
2	José Pesarrodona (ESP)	Kas–Campagnolo	+ 16"
3	Jean-René Bernaudeau (FRA)	Renault–Gitane–Campagnolo	+ 1' 05"

== Stage 14 ==
9 May 1978 — Jaca to Logroño, 219 km (136 mi)

Stage 14 result

Rank	Rider	Team	Time
1	Bernard Hinault (FRA)	Renault–Gitane–Campagnolo	6h 37' 03"
2	Willy Teirlinck (BEL)	Renault–Gitane–Campagnolo	s.t.
3	Jesús Suárez Cueva (ESP)	Kas–Campagnolo	s.t.
4	Ferdi Van Den Haute (BEL)	Marc Zeepcentrale–Superia	s.t.
5	Eulalio García (ESP)	Teka	s.t.
6	Sebastián Pozo (ESP)	Kas–Campagnolo	s.t.
7	Félix Pérez Moreno (ESP)	Teka	s.t.
8	Jos Schipper (NED)	Marc Zeepcentrale–Superia	s.t.
9	Enrique Martínez Heredia (ESP)	Kas–Campagnolo	s.t.
10	Bernardo Alfonsel (ESP)	Teka	s.t.

General classification after Stage 14

Rank	Rider	Team	Time
1	Bernard Hinault (FRA)	Renault–Gitane–Campagnolo	64h 55' 45"
2	José Pesarrodona (ESP)	Kas–Campagnolo	+ 34"
3	Jean-René Bernaudeau (FRA)	Renault–Gitane–Campagnolo	+ 1' 23"
4	Jos Schipper (NED)	Marc Zeepcentrale–Superia	+ 2' 00"
5	Eulalio García (ESP)	Teka	+ 2' 03"
6	Vicente López Carril (ESP)	Kas–Campagnolo	+ 3' 06"
7	Ferdi Van Den Haute (BEL)	Marc Zeepcentrale–Superia	+ 3' 41"
8	Andrés Oliva (ESP)	Teka	+ 3' 48"
9	José Nazabal (ESP)	Kas–Campagnolo	+ 3' 54"
10	Enrique Martínez Heredia (ESP)	Kas–Campagnolo	+ 4' 26"

== Stage 15 ==
10 May 1978 — Logroño to Miranda de Ebro, 131 km (81 mi)

Stage 15 result

Rank	Rider	Team	Time
1	Jean-Philippe Vandenbrande (BEL)	Safir–Beyers–Ludo	3h 38' 53"
2	Bernardo Alfonsel (ESP)	Teka	s.t
3	André Chalmel (FRA)	Renault–Gitane–Campagnolo	s.t.
4	Domingo Perurena (ESP)	Kas–Campagnolo	s.t.
5	Lucien Didier (LUX)	Renault–Gitane–Campagnolo	s.t.
6	Willy Teirlinck (BEL)	Renault–Gitane–Campagnolo	+ 49"
7	Bernard Hinault (FRA)	Renault–Gitane–Campagnolo	s.t.
8	Jos Schipper (NED)	Marc Zeepcentrale–Superia	s.t.
9	Eulalio García (ESP)	Teka	s.t.
10	Francisco Elorriaga (ESP)	Teka	s.t.

General classification after Stage 15

Rank	Rider	Team	Time
1	Bernard Hinault (FRA)	Renault–Gitane–Campagnolo	68h 35' 21"
2	José Pesarrodona (ESP)	Kas–Campagnolo	+ 40"
3	Jean-René Bernaudeau (FRA)	Renault–Gitane–Campagnolo	+ 1' 29"
4	Jos Schipper (NED)	Marc Zeepcentrale–Superia	+ 2' 06"
5	Eulalio García (ESP)	Teka	+ 2' 09"
6	Vicente López Carril (ESP)	Kas–Campagnolo	+ 3' 12"
7	Ferdi Van Den Haute (BEL)	Marc Zeepcentrale–Superia	+ 3' 47"
8	Andrés Oliva (ESP)	Teka	+ 3' 54"
9	José Nazabal (ESP)	Kas–Campagnolo	+ 4' 30"
10	Enrique Martínez Heredia (ESP)	Kas–Campagnolo	+ 4' 34"

== Stage 16 ==
11 May 1978 — Miranda de Ebro to Bien Aparecida Sanctuary, 208 km (129 mi)

Stage 16 result

Rank	Rider	Team	Time
1	Vicente Belda (ESP)	Transmallorca-Gios	6h 49' 21"
2	Giuseppe Walter Passuello (ITA)	Italy	+ 1' 06"
3	Willy Sprangers (BEL)	Safir–Beyers–Ludo	+ 2' 13"
4	Gonzalo Aja (ESP)	Novostil-Helios	+ 2' 48"
5	Domingo Perurena (ESP)	Kas–Campagnolo	s.t.
6	Félix Pérez Moreno (ESP)	Teka	+ 3' 46"
7	Bernard Quilfen (FRA)	Renault–Gitane–Campagnolo	s.t.
8	Luis Alberto Ordiales (ESP)	Transmallorca-Gios	+ 5' 33"
9	Bernard Hinault (FRA)	Renault–Gitane–Campagnolo	+ 5' 35"
10	Eulalio García (ESP)	Teka	+ 5' 37"

General classification after Stage 16

Rank	Rider	Team	Time
1	Bernard Hinault (FRA)	Renault–Gitane–Campagnolo	75h 30' 11"
2	José Pesarrodona (ESP)	Kas–Campagnolo	+ 50"
3	Jean-René Bernaudeau (FRA)	Renault–Gitane–Campagnolo	+ 1' 35"
4	Jos Schipper (NED)	Marc Zeepcentrale–Superia	+ 2' 16"
5	Eulalio García (ESP)	Teka	+ 2' 17"
6	Vicente López Carril (ESP)	Kas–Campagnolo	+ 3' 22"
7	Ferdi Van Den Haute (BEL)	Marc Zeepcentrale–Superia	+ 3' 57"
8	Andrés Oliva (ESP)	Teka	+ 4' 04"
9	José Nazabal (ESP)	Kas–Campagnolo	+ 4' 20"
10	Enrique Martínez Heredia (ESP)	Kas–Campagnolo	+ 4' 42"

== Stage 17 ==
12 May 1978 — Ampuero to Bilbao, 123 km (76 mi)

Stage 17 result

Rank	Rider	Team	Time
1	José Enrique Cima (ESP)	Kas–Campagnolo	3h 31' 11"
2	Ferdi Van Den Haute (BEL)	Marc Zeepcentrale–Superia	+ 2"
3	Enrique Martínez Heredia (ESP)	Kas–Campagnolo	+ 3"
4	Eulalio García (ESP)	Teka	+ 4"
5	Jean-Philippe Vandenbrande (BEL)	Safir–Beyers–Ludo	s.t.
6	Sebastián Pozo (ESP)	Kas–Campagnolo	s.t.
7	Bernard Hinault (FRA)	Renault–Gitane–Campagnolo	s.t.
8	José Luis Mayoz Aizpurua (ESP)	Teka	s.t.
9	Willy Teirlinck (BEL)	Renault–Gitane–Campagnolo	s.t.
10	José Pesarrodona (ESP)	Kas–Campagnolo	s.t.

General classification after Stage 17

Rank	Rider	Team	Time
1	Bernard Hinault (FRA)	Renault–Gitane–Campagnolo	79h 01' 26"
2	José Pesarrodona (ESP)	Kas–Campagnolo	+ 50"
3	Jean-René Bernaudeau (FRA)	Renault–Gitane–Campagnolo	+ 1' 25"
4	Eulalio García (ESP)	Teka	+ 2' 15"
5	Jos Schipper (NED)	Marc Zeepcentrale–Superia	+ 2' 16"
6	Vicente López Carril (ESP)	Kas–Campagnolo	+ 3' 22"
7	Ferdi Van Den Haute (BEL)	Marc Zeepcentrale–Superia	+ 3' 51"
8	Andrés Oliva (ESP)	Teka	+ 4' 04"
9	José Nazabal (ESP)	Kas–Campagnolo	+ 4' 10"
10	Enrique Martínez Heredia (ESP)	Kas–Campagnolo	+ 4' 41"

== Stage 18 ==
13 May 1978 — Bilbao to Amurrio, 154 km (96 mi)

Stage 18 result

Rank	Rider	Team	Time
1	Bernard Hinault (FRA)	Renault–Gitane–Campagnolo	4h 09' 18"
2	Ferdi Van Den Haute (BEL)	Marc Zeepcentrale–Superia	+ 1' 56"
3	Eulalio García (ESP)	Teka	s.t.
4	José Nazabal (ESP)	Kas–Campagnolo	s.t.
5	Jean-René Bernaudeau (FRA)	Renault–Gitane–Campagnolo	s.t.
6	José Pesarrodona (ESP)	Kas–Campagnolo	s.t.
7	José Luis Mayoz Aizpurua (ESP)	Teka	s.t.
8	Jos Schipper (NED)	Marc Zeepcentrale–Superia	s.t.
9	José Enrique Cima (ESP)	Kas–Campagnolo	s.t.
10	Enrique Martínez Heredia (ESP)	Kas–Campagnolo	s.t.

General classification after Stage 18

Rank	Rider	Team	Time
1	Bernard Hinault (FRA)	Renault–Gitane–Campagnolo	83h 10' 28"
2	José Pesarrodona (ESP)	Kas–Campagnolo	+ 2' 52"
3	Jean-René Bernaudeau (FRA)	Renault–Gitane–Campagnolo	+ 3' 47"
4	Eulalio García (ESP)	Teka	+ 4' 27"
5	Jos Schipper (NED)	Marc Zeepcentrale–Superia	+ 4' 28"
6	Ferdi Van Den Haute (BEL)	Marc Zeepcentrale–Superia	+ 6' 01"
7	José Nazabal (ESP)	Kas–Campagnolo	+ 6' 22"
8	Enrique Martínez Heredia (ESP)	Kas–Campagnolo	+ 6' 53"
9	Gonzalo Aja (ESP)	Novostil-Helios	+ 10' 22"
10	Vicente López Carril (ESP)	Kas–Campagnolo	+ 13' 57"

== Stage 19a ==
14 May 1978 — Amurrio to San Sebastián, 84 km (52 mi)

Stage 19a result

Rank	Rider	Team	Time
1	Domingo Perurena (ESP)	Kas–Campagnolo	2h 13' 46"
2	Ferdi Van Den Haute (BEL)	Marc Zeepcentrale–Superia	s.t.
3	Francisco Elorriaga (ESP)	Teka	s.t.
4	Daniele Tinchella (ITA)	Transmallorca-Gios	s.t.
5	José Luis Mayoz Aizpurua (ESP)	Teka	s.t.
6	Antonio Abad Collado (ESP)	Novostil-Helios	s.t.
7	Tullio Rossi (ITA)	Italy	s.t.
8	Roland Berland (FRA)	Renault–Gitane–Campagnolo	s.t.
9	Francisco Fernandez Moreno (ESP)	Teka	s.t.
10	José Nazabal (ESP)	Kas–Campagnolo	s.t.

General classification after Stage 19a

Rank	Rider	Team	Time
1	Bernard Hinault (FRA)	Renault–Gitane–Campagnolo	85h 24' 14"
2	José Pesarrodona (ESP)	Kas–Campagnolo	+ 3' 02"
3	Jean-René Bernaudeau (FRA)	Renault–Gitane–Campagnolo	+ 3' 47"
4	Eulalio García (ESP)	Teka	+ 4' 23"
5	Jos Schipper (NED)	Marc Zeepcentrale–Superia	+ 4' 28"
6	Ferdi Van Den Haute (BEL)	Marc Zeepcentrale–Superia	+ 5' 52"
7	José Nazabal (ESP)	Kas–Campagnolo	+ 6' 12"
8	Enrique Martínez Heredia (ESP)	Kas–Campagnolo	+ 6' 53"
9	Gonzalo Aja (ESP)	Novostil-Helios	+ 10' 22"
10	Vicente López Carril (ESP)	Kas–Campagnolo	+ 13' 57"

== Stage 19b ==
14 May 1978 — San Sebastián ~~to San Sebastián (ITT)~~

Stage 19b was annulled.
