= 1978 Vuelta a España, Prologue to Stage 10 =

Cycling race stages

The 1978 Vuelta a España was the 33rd edition of the Vuelta a España, one of cycling's Grand Tours. The Vuelta began in Gijón, with a prologue individual time trial on 25 April, and Stage 10 occurred on 5 May with a stage to Calafell. The race finished in San Sebastián on 14 May.

== Prologue ==
25 April 1978 — Gijón to Gijón, 8.6 km (5.3 mi) (ITT)

Prologue result and general classification after Prologue

Rank	Rider	Team	Time
1	Bernard Hinault (FRA)	Renault–Gitane–Campagnolo	11' 17"
2	Ferdi Van Den Haute (BEL)	Marc Zeepcentrale–Superia	+ 29"
3	José Viejo (ESP)	Kas–Campagnolo	+ 34"
4	Patrick Cluzaud (FRA)	Renault–Gitane–Campagnolo	+ 35"
5	José Enrique Cima (ESP)	Kas–Campagnolo	+ 37"
6	José Pesarrodona (ESP)	Kas–Campagnolo	+ 38"
7	Willy Teirlinck (BEL)	Renault–Gitane–Campagnolo	+ 39"
8	Francisco Elorriaga (ESP)	Teka	s.t.
9	Jos Schipper (NED)	Marc Zeepcentrale–Superia	+ 41"
10	Franco Conti (ITA)	Italy	s.t.

== Stage 1 ==
26 April 1978 — Gijón to Gijón, 144 km (89 mi)

Stage 1 result

Rank	Rider	Team	Time
1	Jos Schipper (NED)	Marc Zeepcentrale–Superia	3h 51' 15"
2	Adrianus Prinsen (NED)	Bode Deuren–Shimano	+ 15"
3	Willy Teirlinck (BEL)	Renault–Gitane–Campagnolo	s.t.
4	Jesús Suárez Cueva (ESP)	Kas–Campagnolo	s.t.
5	Francisco Elorriaga (ESP)	Teka	s.t.
6	José Pesarrodona (ESP)	Kas–Campagnolo	s.t.
7	Johnny Vanderveken (BEL)	Old Lord's–Splendor–K.S.B.	s.t.
8	Salvatore Maccali (ITA)	Italy	s.t.
9	Feliciano Sobradillo Casado (ESP)	Novostil–Helios	s.t.
10	Hendrik Vandenbrande (NED)	Safir–Beyers–Ludo	s.t.

General classification after Stage 1

Rank	Rider	Team	Time
1	Bernard Hinault (FRA)	Renault–Gitane–Campagnolo	4h 02' 47"
2	Jos Schipper (NED)	Marc Zeepcentrale–Superia	+ 14"
3	Ferdi Van Den Haute (BEL)	Marc Zeepcentrale–Superia	+ 29"
4	José Viejo (ESP)	Kas–Campagnolo	+ 34"
5	Patrick Cluzaud (FRA)	Renault–Gitane–Campagnolo	+ 35"
6	Adrianus Prinsen (NED)	Bode Deuren–Shimano	+ 36"
7	José Enrique Cima (ESP)	Kas–Campagnolo	+ 37"
8	José Pesarrodona (ESP)	Kas–Campagnolo	+ 38"
9	Willy Teirlinck (BEL)	Renault–Gitane–Campagnolo	+ 39"
10	Francisco Elorriaga (ESP)	Teka	s.t.

== Stage 2 ==
27 April 1978 — Gijón to Cangas de Onís, 94 km (58 mi)

Stage 2 result

Rank	Rider	Team	Time
1	José Enrique Cima (ESP)	Kas–Campagnolo	2h 27' 53"
2	José Viejo (ESP)	Kas–Campagnolo	+ 6"
3	Bernard Hinault (FRA)	Renault–Gitane–Campagnolo	s.t.
4	Manuel Esparza (ESP)	Teka	s.t.
5	José Manuel García Rodríguez (ESP)	Transmallorca–Gios	s.t.
6	Vicente Belda (ESP)	Transmallorca–Gios	s.t.
7	Eulalio García (ESP)	Teka	+ 24"
8	Jos Schipper (NED)	Marc Zeepcentrale–Superia	s.t.
9	Ferdi Van Den Haute (BEL)	Marc Zeepcentrale–Superia	s.t.
10	Jean-René Bernaudeau (FRA)	Renault–Gitane–Campagnolo	s.t.

General classification after Stage 2

Rank	Rider	Team	Time
1	Bernard Hinault (FRA)	Renault–Gitane–Campagnolo	6h 30' 46"
2	José Enrique Cima (ESP)	Kas–Campagnolo	+ 19"
3	José Viejo (ESP)	Kas–Campagnolo	+ 28"
4	Jos Schipper (NED)	Marc Zeepcentrale–Superia	+ 32"
5	José Manuel García Rodríguez (ESP)	Transmallorca–Gios	+ 42"
6	Ferdi Van Den Haute (BEL)	Marc Zeepcentrale–Superia	+ 47"
7	José Pesarrodona (ESP)	Kas–Campagnolo	+ 56"
8	Franco Conti (ITA)	Italy	+ 59"
9	José Antonio González (ESP)	Renault–Gitane–Campagnolo	+ 1' 00"
10	Eulalio García (ESP)	Teka	+ 1' 04"

== Stage 3 ==
28 April 1978 — Cangas de Onís to León, 187 km (116 mi)

Stage 3 result

Rank	Rider	Team	Time
1	Ferdi Van Den Haute (BEL)	Marc Zeepcentrale–Superia	5h 27' 52"
2	Francisco Elorriaga (ESP)	Teka	s.t.
3	Enrique Martínez Heredia (ESP)	Kas–Campagnolo	s.t.
4	Jean-René Bernaudeau (FRA)	Renault–Gitane–Campagnolo	s.t.
5	Ángel López del Álamo (ESP)	Novostil–Helios	s.t.
6	José Pesarrodona (ESP)	Kas–Campagnolo	s.t.
7	Eulalio García (ESP)	Teka	+ 1' 22"
8	José Viejo (ESP)	Kas–Campagnolo	s.t.
9	Jos Schipper (NED)	Marc Zeepcentrale–Superia	s.t.
10	Jean-Philippe Vandenbrande (BEL)	Safir–Beyers–Ludo	s.t.

General classification after Stage 3

Rank	Rider	Team	Time
1	Ferdi Van Den Haute (BEL)	Marc Zeepcentrale–Superia	11h 59' 13"
2	José Pesarrodona (ESP)	Kas–Campagnolo	+ 21"
3	Enrique Martínez Heredia (ESP)	Kas–Campagnolo	+ 43"
4	Bernard Hinault (FRA)	Renault–Gitane–Campagnolo	+ 47"
5	Jean-René Bernaudeau (FRA)	Renault–Gitane–Campagnolo	+ 49"
6	José Enrique Cima (ESP)	Kas–Campagnolo	+ 1' 06"
7	José Viejo (ESP)	Kas–Campagnolo	+ 1' 15"
8	Jos Schipper (NED)	Marc Zeepcentrale–Superia	+ 1' 19"
9	José Manuel García Rodríguez (ESP)	Transmallorca–Gios	+ 1' 29"
10	Franco Conti (ITA)	Italy	+ 1' 46"

== Stage 4 ==
29 April 1978 — León to Valladolid, 171 km (106 mi)

Stage 4 result

Rank	Rider	Team	Time
1	Patrick Lefevere (BEL)	Marc Zeepcentrale–Superia	4h 50' 04"
2	Fons van Katwijk (NED)	Marc Zeepcentrale–Superia	+ 30"
3	Adrianus Prinsen (NED)	Bode Deuren–Shimano	s.t.
4	Francisco Elorriaga (ESP)	Teka	s.t.
5	Jos Schipper (NED)	Marc Zeepcentrale–Superia	s.t.
6	Ferdi Van Den Haute (BEL)	Marc Zeepcentrale–Superia	s.t.
7	Jesús Suárez Cueva (ESP)	Kas–Campagnolo	+ 1' 22"
8	Ignazio Paleari (ITA)	Italy	s.t.
9	Daniele Tinchella (ITA)	Transmallorca–Gios	s.t.
10	Cesare Cipollini (ITA)	Italy	s.t.

General classification after Stage 4

Rank	Rider	Team	Time
1	Ferdi Van Den Haute (BEL)	Marc Zeepcentrale–Superia	16h 49' 47"
2	José Pesarrodona (ESP)	Kas–Campagnolo	+ 21"
3	Enrique Martínez Heredia (ESP)	Kas–Campagnolo	+ 43"
4	Bernard Hinault (FRA)	Renault–Gitane–Campagnolo	+ 47"
5	Jean-René Bernaudeau (FRA)	Renault–Gitane–Campagnolo	+ 49"
6	José Viejo (ESP)	Kas–Campagnolo	+ 1' 15"
7	Jos Schipper (NED)	Marc Zeepcentrale–Superia	+ 1' 19"
8	Franco Conti (ITA)	Italy	+ 1' 46"
9	José Antonio González (ESP)	Kas–Campagnolo	+ 1' 47"
10	José Manuel García Rodríguez (ESP)	Transmallorca–Gios	+ 1' 51"

== Stage 5 ==
30 April 1978 — Valladolid to Ávila, 136 km (85 mi)

Stage 5 result

Rank	Rider	Team	Time
1	Willy Teirlinck (BEL)	Renault–Gitane–Campagnolo	3h 52' 24"
2	Ferdi Van Den Haute (BEL)	Marc Zeepcentrale–Superia	+ 14"
3	Adrianus Prinsen (NED)	Bode Deuren–Shimano	s.t.
4	Francisco Elorriaga (ESP)	Teka	s.t.
5	Andrés Oliva (ESP)	Teka	s.t.
6	Annunzio Colombo (ITA)	Italy	s.t.
7	José Viejo (ESP)	Kas–Campagnolo	s.t.
8	Luis Alberto Ordiales (ESP)	Transmallorca–Gios	s.t.
9	Marc Dierickx (BEL)	Marc Zeepcentrale–Superia	s.t.
10	Bernard Becaas (FRA)	Renault–Gitane–Campagnolo	s.t.

General classification after Stage 5

Rank	Rider	Team	Time
1	Ferdi Van Den Haute (BEL)	Marc Zeepcentrale–Superia	20h 42' 19"
2	José Pesarrodona (ESP)	Kas–Campagnolo	+ 25"
3	Enrique Martínez Heredia (ESP)	Kas–Campagnolo	+ 37"
4	Bernard Hinault (FRA)	Renault–Gitane–Campagnolo	+ 41"
5	Jean-René Bernaudeau (FRA)	Renault–Gitane–Campagnolo	+ 43"
6	José Viejo (ESP)	Kas–Campagnolo	+ 1' 21"
7	Jos Schipper (NED)	Marc Zeepcentrale–Superia	+ 1' 25"
8	Franco Conti (ITA)	Italy	+ 1' 52"
9	José Antonio González (ESP)	Kas–Campagnolo	+ 1' 53"
10	José Manuel García Rodríguez (ESP)	Transmallorca–Gios	+ 1' 57"

== Stage 6 ==
1 May 1978 — Torrelaguna to Torrejón de Ardoz, 46 km (29 mi)

Stage 6 result

Rank	Rider	Team	Time
1	Fons van Katwijk (NED)	Marc Zeepcentrale–Superia	1h 05' 59"
2	Benny Schepmans (BEL)	Safir–Beyers–Ludo	s.t.
3	Adrianus Prinsen (NED)	Bode Deuren–Shimano	s.t.
4	Leo Van Thielen (BEL)	Safir–Beyers–Ludo	s.t.
5	Ferdi Van Den Haute (BEL)	Marc Zeepcentrale–Superia	s.t.
6	Leone Pizzini (ITA)	Italy	s.t.
7	Marc Dierickx (BEL)	Marc Zeepcentrale–Superia	s.t.
8	Salvatore Maccali (ITA)	Italy	s.t.
9	José Viejo (ESP)	Kas–Campagnolo	s.t.
10	Ignazio Paleari (ITA)	Italy	s.t.

General classification after Stage 6

Rank	Rider	Team	Time
1	Ferdi Van Den Haute (BEL)	Marc Zeepcentrale–Superia	
2	José Pesarrodona (ESP)	Kas–Campagnolo	+ 27"
3	Enrique Martínez Heredia (ESP)	Kas–Campagnolo	+ 49"

== Stage 7 ==
2 May 1978 — Torrejón de Ardoz to Cuenca, 160 km (99 mi)

Stage 7 result

Rank	Rider	Team	Time
1	Domingo Perurena (ESP)	Kas–Campagnolo	3h 59' 07"
2	Cees Bal (NED)	Bode Deuren–Shimano	+ 26"
3	Gilbert Chaumaz (FRA)	Renault–Gitane–Campagnolo	+ 1' 41"
4	Fons van Katwijk (NED)	Marc Zeepcentrale–Superia	+ 2' 10"
5	José Viejo (ESP)	Kas–Campagnolo	s.t.
6	Ferdi Van Den Haute (BEL)	Marc Zeepcentrale–Superia	s.t.
7	Willy Teirlinck (BEL)	Renault–Gitane–Campagnolo	s.t.
8	Jesús Suárez Cueva (ESP)	Kas–Campagnolo	s.t.
9	Daniele Tinchella (ITA)	Transmallorca–Gios	s.t.
10	Eulalio García (ESP)	Teka	s.t.

General classification after Stage 6

Rank	Rider	Team	Time
1	Ferdi Van Den Haute (BEL)	Marc Zeepcentrale–Superia	25h 49' 35"
2	José Pesarrodona (ESP)	Kas–Campagnolo	+ 27"
3	Enrique Martínez Heredia (ESP)	Kas–Campagnolo	+ 49"
4	Bernard Hinault (FRA)	Renault–Gitane–Campagnolo	+ 55"
5	Jean-René Bernaudeau (FRA)	Renault–Gitane–Campagnolo	+ 57"
6	José Viejo (ESP)	Kas–Campagnolo	+ 1' 17"
7	Jos Schipper (NED)	Marc Zeepcentrale–Superia	+ 1' 25"
8	Franco Conti (ITA)	Italy	+ 1' 52"
9	José Antonio González (ESP)	Kas–Campagnolo	+ 1' 53"
10	José Manuel García Rodríguez (ESP)	Transmallorca–Gios	+ 1' 57"

== Stage 8 ==
3 May 1978 — Cuenca to Benicàssim, 249 km (155 mi)

Stage 8 result

Rank	Rider	Team	Time
1	Fons van Katwijk (NED)	Marc Zeepcentrale–Superia	6h 38' 20"
2	Benny Schepmans (BEL)	Safir–Beyers–Ludo	s.t.
3	Jesús Suárez Cueva (ESP)	Kas–Campagnolo	s.t.
4	Willy Teirlinck (BEL)	Renault–Gitane–Campagnolo	s.t.
5	Daniele Tinchella (ITA)	Transmallorca–Gios	s.t.
6	Ferdi Van Den Haute (BEL)	Marc Zeepcentrale–Superia	s.t.
7	Ignazio Paleari (ITA)	Italy	s.t.
8	Francisco Elorriaga (ESP)	Teka	s.t.
9	Adrianus Prinsen (NED)	Bode Deuren–Shimano	s.t.
10	Salvatore Maccali (ITA)	Italy	s.t.

General classification after Stage 8

Rank	Rider	Team	Time
1	Ferdi Van Den Haute (BEL)	Marc Zeepcentrale–Superia	32h 27' 55"
2	José Pesarrodona (ESP)	Kas–Campagnolo	+ 27"
3	Enrique Martínez Heredia (ESP)	Kas–Campagnolo	+ 49"
4	Bernard Hinault (FRA)	Renault–Gitane–Campagnolo	+ 53"
5	Jean-René Bernaudeau (FRA)	Renault–Gitane–Campagnolo	+ 55"
6	José Viejo (ESP)	Kas–Campagnolo	+ 1' 17"
7	Jos Schipper (NED)	Marc Zeepcentrale–Superia	+ 1' 25"
8	Franco Conti (ITA)	Italy	+ 1' 53"
9	José Antonio González (ESP)	Kas–Campagnolo	+ 1' 54"
10	José Manuel García Rodríguez (ESP)	Transmallorca–Gios	+ 1' 57"

== Stage 9 ==
4 May 1978 — Benicàssim to Tortosa, 156 km (97 mi)

Stage 9 result

Rank	Rider	Team	Time
1	Ferdi Van Den Haute (BEL)	Marc Zeepcentrale–Superia	4h 32' 04"
2	Fons van Katwijk (NED)	Marc Zeepcentrale–Superia	s.t.
3	Willy Teirlinck (BEL)	Renault–Gitane–Campagnolo	s.t.
4	Jesús Suárez Cueva (ESP)	Kas–Campagnolo	s.t.
5	Daniele Tinchella (ITA)	Transmallorca–Gios	s.t.
6	Fridolin Keller (SUI)	Bode Deuren–Shimano	s.t.
7	Ignazio Paleari (ITA)	Italy	s.t.
8	Salvatore Maccali (ITA)	Italy	s.t.
9	Wim Schroyens (BEL)	Old Lord's–Splendor–K.S.B.	s.t.
10	André Chalmel (FRA)	Renault–Gitane–Campagnolo	s.t.

General classification after Stage 9

Rank	Rider	Team	Time
1	Ferdi Van Den Haute (BEL)	Marc Zeepcentrale–Superia	36h 59' 47"
2	José Pesarrodona (ESP)	Kas–Campagnolo	+ 39"
3	Enrique Martínez Heredia (ESP)	Kas–Campagnolo	+ 1' 01"
4	Bernard Hinault (FRA)	Renault–Gitane–Campagnolo	+ 1' 05"
5	Jean-René Bernaudeau (FRA)	Renault–Gitane–Campagnolo	+ 1' 07"
6	José Viejo (ESP)	Kas–Campagnolo	+ 1' 29"
7	Jos Schipper (NED)	Marc Zeepcentrale–Superia	+ 1' 35"
8	Franco Conti (ITA)	Italy	+ 2' 04"
9	José Antonio González (ESP)	Kas–Campagnolo	+ 2' 05"
10	José Manuel García Rodríguez (ESP)	Transmallorca–Gios	+ 2' 09"

== Stage 10 ==
5 May 1978 — Tortosa to Calafell, 201 km (125 mi)

Stage 10 result

Rank	Rider	Team	Time
1	Willy Teirlinck (BEL)	Renault–Gitane–Campagnolo	5h 32' 24"
2	Jesús Suárez Cueva (ESP)	Kas–Campagnolo	+ 6"
3	Ferdi Van Den Haute (BEL)	Marc Zeepcentrale–Superia	s.t.
4	Francisco Elorriaga (ESP)	Teka	s.t.
5	Salvatore Maccali (ITA)	Italy	s.t.
6	Bernard Becaas (FRA)	Renault–Gitane–Campagnolo	s.t.
7	Daniele Tinchella (ITA)	Transmallorca–Gios	s.t.
8	Hendrik Vandenbrande (NED)	Safir–Beyers–Ludo	s.t.
9	Jean-Philippe Vandenbrande (BEL)	Safir–Beyers–Ludo	s.t.
10	Wim Schroyens (BEL)	Old Lord's–Splendor–K.S.B.	s.t.

General classification after Stage 10

Rank	Rider	Team	Time
1	Ferdi Van Den Haute (BEL)	Marc Zeepcentrale–Superia	42h 32' 17"
2	José Pesarrodona (ESP)	Kas–Campagnolo	+ 39"
3	Bernard Hinault (FRA)	Renault–Gitane–Campagnolo	+ 1' 01"
4	Enrique Martínez Heredia (ESP)	Kas–Campagnolo	+ 1' 11"
5	Jean-René Bernaudeau (FRA)	Renault–Gitane–Campagnolo	+ 1' 17"
6	José Viejo (ESP)	Kas–Campagnolo	+ 1' 25"
7	Jos Schipper (NED)	Marc Zeepcentrale–Superia	+ 1' 35"
8	Franco Conti (ITA)	Italy	+ 2' 04"
9	José Antonio González (ESP)	Kas–Campagnolo	+ 2' 05"
10	José Manuel García Rodríguez (ESP)	Transmallorca–Gios	+ 2' 09"
