= 1978 Vuelta a España =

Race details
- Dates: 25 April – 14 May
- Stages: 19 stages + Prologue, including 2 split stages
- Distance: 2,995 km (1,861 mi)
- Winning time: 85h 24' 14"

Results
Jersey awarded to the overall winner	Winner	Bernard Hinault (FRA)	(Renault–Gitane)
	Second	José Pesarrodona (ESP)	(Kas)
	Third	Jean-René Bernaudeau (FRA)	(Renault–Gitane)
Jersey awarded to the points classification winner	Points	Ferdi Van Den Haute (BEL)	(Marc–Zeepcentrales–Superia)
Jersey awarded to the mountains classification winner	Mountains	Andrés Oliva (ESP)	(Teka)
	Sprints	Bernard Hinault (FRA)	(Renault–Gitane)
	Team	Kas	

The 33rd Edition Vuelta a España (Tour of Spain), a long-distance bicycle stage race and one of the three grand tours, was held from 25 April to 14 May 1978. It consisted of 19 stages covering a total of 2,995 km (1,861 mi), and was won by Bernard Hinault of the Renault–Elf–Gitane cycling team. Ferdi Van Den Haute won the points classification and Andrés Oliva won the mountains classification.

The final stage in San Sebastian was annulled because of Basque protesters, who threw logs into the roads, and then blocked Jean-Rene Bernaudeau.

== Route ==
List of stages
Stage	Date	Course	Distance	Type	Winner
P	25 April	Gijón to Gijón	8.6 km (5 mi)	Individual time trial	Bernard Hinault (FRA)
1	26 April	Gijón to Gijón	144 km (89 mi)		Jos Schipper (NED)
2	27 April	Gijón to Cangas de Onís	94 km (58 mi)		Enrique Cima (ESP)
3	28 April	Cangas de Onís to León	187 km (116 mi)		Ferdi Van Den Haute (BEL)
4	29 April	León to Valladolid	171 km (106 mi)		Patrick Lefevere (BEL)
5	30 April	Valladolid to Ávila	136 km (85 mi)		Willy Teirlinck (BEL)
6	1 May	Torrelaguna to Torrejón de Ardoz	46 km (29 mi)		Fons van Katwijk (NED)
7	2 May	Torrejón de Ardoz to Cuenca	160 km (99 mi)		Domingo Perurena (ESP)
8	3 May	Cuenca to Benicàssim	249 km (155 mi)		Fons van Katwijk (NED)
9	4 May	Benicàssim to Tortosa	156 km (97 mi)		Ferdi Van Den Haute (BEL)
10	5 May	Tortosa to Calafell	201 km (125 mi)		Willy Teirlinck (BEL)
11a	6 May	Calafell to Barcelona	67 km (42 mi)		Francisco Elorriaga (ESP)
11b	6 May	Barcelona to Barcelona	3.8 km (2 mi)	Individual time trial	Bernard Hinault (FRA)
12	7 May	Bellaterra (Cerdanyola del Vallès) to La Tossa de Montbui (Santa Margarida de Montbui)	205 km (127 mi)		Bernard Hinault (FRA)
13	8 May	Igualada to Jaca	243 km (151 mi)		Salvatore Maccali (ITA)
14	9 May	Jaca to Logroño	219 km (136 mi)		Bernard Hinault (FRA)
15	10 May	Logroño to Miranda de Ebro	131 km (81 mi)		Jean-Philippe Vandenbrande (BEL)
16	11 May	Miranda de Ebro to Bien Aparecida Sanctuary	208 km (129 mi)		Vicente Belda (ESP)
17	12 May	Ampuero to Bilbao	123 km (76 mi)		Vicente Belda (ESP)
18	13 May	Bilbao to Amurrio	154 km (96 mi)		Bernard Hinault (FRA)
19a	14 May	Amurrio to San Sebastián	84 km (52 mi)		Domingo Perurena (ESP)
19b	14 May	San Sebastián to San Sebastián		Individual time trial	Annulled
	Total		2,995 km (1,861 mi)		

== Results ==
=== General classification ===
Final general classification (1–10)
Rank	Name	Team	Time
1	Bernard Hinault (FRA)	Renault–Elf–Gitane	85h 24' 14"
2	José Pesarrodona (ESP)	Kas–Campagnolo	+ 3' 02"
3	Jean-René Bernaudeau (FRA)	Renault–Elf–Gitane	+ 3' 47"
4	Eulalio Garcia Pereda (ESP)	Teka	+ 4' 23"
5	Jos Schipper (NED)	Marc–Zeepcentrale	+ 4' 28"
6	Ferdi Van Den Haute (BEL)	Marc–Zeepcentrale	+ 5' 52"
7	José Nazabal (ESP)	Kas–Campagnolo	+ 6' 12"
8	Enrique Martinez (ESP)	Kas–Campagnolo	+ 6' 53"
9	Gonzalo Aja (ESP)	Novostil–Helios	+ 10' 12"
10	Vicente López Carril (ESP)	Kas–Campagnolo	+ 13' 57"

Final general classification (11–25)
Rank	Name	Team	Time
11	Andrés Oliva (ESP)	Teka	
12	Sebastian Pozo Fontivero (ESP)	Kas–Campagnolo	
13	Bernardo Alfonsel (ESP)	Teka	
14	Manuel Esparza Sanz (ESP)	Teka	
15	Gilbert Chaumaz (FRA)	Renault–Elf–Gitane	
16	Andrés Gandarias (ESP)	Novostil–Helios	
17	José Enrique Cima (ESP)	Kas–Campagnolo	
18	José Luis Mayoz (ESP)	Teka	
19	Alberto Fernández (ESP)	Novostil–Helios	
20	José Martíns Freitas (POR)	Teka	
21	Vicente Belda (ESP)	Transmallorca–Gios	
22	Domingo Perurena (ESP)	Kas–Campagnolo	
23	Felix Perez (ESP)	Teka	
24	Francisco Fernandez (ESP)	Teka	
25	Willy Teirlinck (BEL)	Renault–Elf–Gitane	

=== Points classification ===
Final points classification (1–9)
Rank	Name	Team	Points
1	Ferdi Van Den Haute (BEL)	Marc–Zeepcentrale	210
2	Willy Teirlinck (BEL)	Renault–Elf–Gitane	157
3	Bernard Hinault (FRA)	Renault–Elf–Gitane	130
4	Francisco Elorriaga (ESP)	Teka	113
5	Fons van Katwijk (NED)	Marc–Zeepcentrale	108
6	Eulalio Garcia (ESP)	Teka	92
7	Jos Schipper (NED)	Marc–Zeepcentrale	70
8	José Enrique Cima (ESP)	Kas–Campagnolo	70
9	Daniele Tinchella (ITA)	Transmallorca	69

=== Mountains classification ===
Final mountains classification (1–5)
Rank	Name	Team	Points
1	Andrés Oliva (ESP)	Teka	112
2	José Enrique Cima (ESP)	Kas–Campagnolo	81
3	Bernard Hinault (FRA)	Renault–Elf–Gitane	60
4	Andrés Gandarias (ESP)	Novostil–Helios	48
5	Jose-Luis Mayoz (ESP)	Teka	44

=== Team classification ===
Final team classification (1–9)
Rank	Team	Time
1	Kas	255h 41' 01"
2	Teka	+ 5' 52"
3	Renault	+ 10' 07"
4	Novostil–Helios	+ 35' 44"
5	Transmallorca	+ 1h 03' 05"
6	Superia	+ 1h 11' 16"
7	Italia	+ 1h 37' 52"
8	Safir	+ 2h 41' 03"
9	Splendor	+ 3h 24' 27"

=== Intermediate sprints classification ===
Final intermediate sprints classification (1–5)
Rank	Name	Team	Points
1	Bernard Hinault (FRA)	Renault–Elf–Gitane	31
2	Felix Perez (ESP)	Teka	11
3	Willy Teirlinck (BEL)	Renault–Elf–Gitane	7
4	Andrés Gandarias (ESP)	Novostil–Helios	6
5	Domingo Perurena (ESP)	Kas–Campagnolo	5
