= 1976 Volta a Catalunya =

Race details
- Dates: 8–15 September 1976
- Stages: 7 + Prologue
- Distance: 1,233.1 km (766.2 mi)
- Winning time: 33h 49' 54"

Results
	Winner	Enrique Martínez Heredia (ESP)	(Kas–Campagnolo)
	Second	Ronald De Witte (BEL)	(Brooklyn)
	Third	Agustín Tamames (ESP)	(Super Ser)
	Points	Roger De Vlaeminck (BEL)	(Brooklyn)
	Mountains	José Enrique Cima (ESP)	(Novostil–Transmallorca)
	Sprints	Andrés Oliva (ESP)	(Kas–Campagnolo)
	Team	Kas–Campagnolo	

The 1976 Volta a Catalunya was the 56th edition of the Volta a Catalunya cycle race and was held from 8 to 15 September 1976. The race started in Amposta and finished in Sitges. The race was won by Enrique Martínez Heredia of the Kas–Campagnolo team.

== General classification ==
Final general classification

Rank	Rider	Team	Time
1	Enrique Martínez Heredia (ESP)	Kas–Campagnolo	33h 49' 54"
2	Ronald De Witte (BEL)	Brooklyn	+ 2' 46"
3	Agustín Tamames (ESP)	Super Ser	+ 3' 03"
4	José Enrique Cima (ESP)	Novostil–Transmallorca	+ 3' 16"
5	Roger De Vlaeminck (BEL)	Brooklyn	+ 3' 34"
6	Pedro Torres (ESP)	Super Ser	+ 3' 58"
7	Jørgen Marcussen (DEN)	Furzi–Vibor	+ 4' 42"
8	Domingo Perurena (ESP)	Kas–Campagnolo	+ 4' 56"
9	Josef Fuchs (SUI)	Super Ser	+ 5' 11"
10	Antonio Martos (ESP)	Kas–Campagnolo	+ 6' 03"
