= Coccolo =

Coccolo is a surname with various origins. Notable people with the surname include:

- Cecilia Domeniguini Coccolo (born 1991), Uruguayan footballer
- Dante Coccolo (born 1957), French bicycle racer
- Luca Coccolo (born 1998), Italian footballer
