= Anna Aguilar-Amat =

Catalan poet

Anna Aguilar-Amat (full name: Anna Aguilar-Amat i Castillo; born 31 January 1962 in Barcelona) is a Catalan poet, translator, researcher and university professor in Terminology and Computational Linguistics. She writes primarily in Catalan (as a poet, she writes exclusively in Catalan, a language which she also uses for some of her essays and studies as well) but also has some work in Spanish (primarily essays and studies). She has a PHD from the Universitat Autònoma de Barcelona where she now teaches Terminology applied to Translation at the Translation Faculty. She published five collections of poems and has received several awards for Catalan poetry. Her poetic work is present in several anthologies of Catalan poets and she has been translated into Spanish, English, French, Italian, Sardinian, Macedonian, Finnish, Arabian, Turkish, Greek, German and Slovenian. She was included in the Anthology New European Poets by Wayne Miller & Kevin Prufer, Minnesota 2008.

== Biography ==
Anna Aguilar-Amat has a PhD from the Universitat Autònoma de Barcelona, where she now teaches Terminology and Computational Linguistics at the Translation Faculty and has written several specialised texts in that field. Although she received some literary awards as a student and has written the lyrics for various musicians, she came to the foreground of the contemporary Catalan poetry scene when she was awarded three of the most prestigious and traditional prizes for Catalan poetry in two consecutive years: the 'Jocs Florals' of the city of Barcelona (Premi Englantina d'Or als Jocs Florals de Barcelona 2000) for her first published work, the book Petrolier (Oil Tanker, series "Edicions de la Guerra", Editorial Denes, Paiporta, València, 2003), the ‘Carles Riba Award’ (Premi Carles Riba 2000) for Trànsit entre dos vols (Transit between Two Flights, Edicions Proa, Barcelona, 2001), and the ‘Màrius Torres Award’ (Premi Màrius Torres 2001) for Música i escorbut (Music and Scurvy, Edicions 62, Barcelona, 2002, published in English as an e-book by Sandstone Press).

Together with the well-known Catalan poet, Francesc Parcerisas, she has also published the poetry book Coses Petites : poemes a quatre mans (Little Things: Poems by Two Hands, Miquel Plana, Olot, 2002), with illustrations by the publisher, Miquel Plana, and the book of essays, El placer de la lectura (The Pleasure of Reading, Editorial Síntesis, Madrid, 2004, in Spanish).

Her fourth book of poems is Jocs de l'oca (The Goose Games, Servei de Publicacions, Universitat Autònoma de Barcelona, Bellaterra, 2006). The poems in the book are laid out like the 63 squares of the board game (Game of the Goose) and the book can be "played" as well as read.

Her poetic work is included in various anthologies of Catalan poetry and she has been translated into Arabic, English, Finnish, French, Italian, Macedonian, Sardinian, Slovene, Spanish and Ukrainian. She has been included in the anthology New European Poets, edited by Wayne Miller & Kevin Prufer (Greywolf Press, Minnesota, 2008, ISBN 978-1-55597-492-3, translations of Aguilar-Amat's poems by Anna Crowe). She also forms part of the Scottish Poetry Library (Project Ariane, European Union, 2001 and 2004).

Since 2003, she has been president of QUARKpoesia (Aula de Poesia de la Universitat Autònoma), a university association promoting poetry and translation of poetry from less translated languages (minority literatures). In 2006, she organized and launched the poetry publication series, Refraccions (Refractions), dedicated primarily to publishing bilingual poetry books, through the Universitat Autònoma de Barcelona's publishing office, the Servei de Publicacions.

As a performer, she has toured far and wide reciting her poetry. She has participated in the major festivals of Catalonia and Valencian Community, including the "Setmana de Poesia de Barcelona 2001" (Barcelona Poetry Week, considered the most prestigious poetry festival of Catalonia), and has organized a number of poetry readings at the university, as well as inviting guest speakers from abroad. In (2007) she was invited to participate at the first Festa de la Poesia a Sitges, created by the also poets Joan Duran and Cèlia Sànchez-Mústich, where she was honoured for her contribution to the Catalan Poetry. On the international level, she has recited in various countries, the latest being Argentina (2010) and Ukraine (International Literary Festival of Lviv, September 2010), earlier festivals including StAnza, Scotland's Poetry Festival (2000), as well as a recital at the Nuyorican Poets Café ("Catalan Poets Pay Homage to Pedro Pietri", World Voices Festival, NY, 2007).

Her poetry surprises with its radical authenticity, which manifests itself through a combination of narrative, lyricism and original imagery.

== Works ==
=== Poetry ===
- Petrolier (Oil Tanker), series "Edicions de la Guerra", Editorial Denes, Paiporta, València, 2003 (awarded the "Jocs Florals" of the city of Barcelona = Premi Englantina d'Or als Jocs Florals de Barcelona 2000).
- Trànsit entre dos vols (Transit between Two Flights), Edicions Proa, Barcelona, 2001 (Premi Carles Riba = Carles Riba Award, 2000).
- Música i escorbut (Music and Scurvy), Edicions 62, Barcelona, 2002 (Premi Màrius Torrs = Màrius Torres Award, 2001)
- Coses Petites : poemes a quatre mans (Little Things: Poems by Two Hands), co-authored by Francesc Parcerisas, with illustrations by the publisher. Miquel Plana Publisher, Olot, 2002.
- Music and Scurvy, translation from the Catalan of the book Música i escorbut by Anna Crowe, Sandstone Press, Scotland, 2005 (ISBN 978-1905207022).
- Jocs de l'oca (The Goose Games), Servei de Publicacions, Universitat Autònoma de Barcelona, Bellaterra, 2006.
- Càrrega de color (Color Load), Editorial Meteora, Barcelona, 2011.
- Numerous contributions to Catalan literary journals.

=== Anthologized as a poet ===
Anna Aguilar-Amat has been anthologized as a poet in the following books, among others:

- Sol de sal. La nueva poesía catalana (Sun of Salt: New Catalan Poetry), translated into Spanish by Jordi Virallonga. DVD Ediciones, Barcelona, 2001.
- EPIC poem-postcards. Scottish Poetry Library, 2001.
- The EmLit Project: European minority literatures in translation, Brunel U. Press, 2003 (ISBN 1902316363).
- Bouesia 2006, regsexcital de bouversos (Anthology of poems from the poetry festival called Bouesia, Deltebre). Arola Editors, Tarragona, 2006.
- Light off water : XXV Catalan Poems 1978-2002, Carcanet, Scottish Poetry Library, 2007 (ISBN 1857549163).
- New European Poets, edited by Wayne Miller & Kevin Prufer. Greywolf Press, Minnesota, 2008 (ISBN 978-1-55597-492-3).
- Eròtiques i despentinades. Un recorregut de cent anys per la poesia catalana amb veu de dona (Erotic and with their hair down: A trip through a hundred years of Catalan poetry with a woman's voice), Encarna Sant-Celoni i Verger, ed. Illustrations by Maria Montes. Arola Editors, Tarragona, 2008.
- Poetàrium: Contemporary Catalan Poetry, Institut Ramon Llull (Government of Catalonia & Government of the Balearic Islands), Barcelona, 2009 (the anthology is a selection of 34 contemporary poets the government wished to showcase from among the many that are active). (In English).

=== Essay ===
- El placer de la lectura (The Pleasure of Reading), Editorial Síntesis, Madrid, 2004 (collection of essays, in Spanish).
- Numerous articles in journals.
