= Danguillaume =

Danguillaume is a surname. Notable people with the surname include:

- Camille Danguillaume (1919–1950), French cyclist
- Jean Danguillaume (1932–2025), French cyclist
- Jean-Pierre Danguillaume (born 1946), French cyclist
