= Center for Research in Agricultural Genomics (Bellaterra) =

The Center for Research in Agricultural Genomics (CRAG) is located at the Campus UAB in Bellaterra. As a public consortium incorporating research groups from the Consejo Superior de Investigaciones Cientificas and the Universitat Autonoma de Barcelona (UAB) and ICREA researchers, it is devoted to the study of the genomics and genetics of agriculturally important plants and farm animals.
