= Paulino Martínez =

Paulino Martínez may refer to:

- Paulino Martínez (cyclist) (born 1952), Spanish cyclist
- Paulino Martínez (footballer) (born 1973), Spanish footballer
