= Région Pays de la Loire Tour =

French multi-day road cycling race

Race details
- Date: Early April
- Region: Pays de la Loire, France
- English name: Circuit of Sarthe
- Local name: Circuit de la Sarthe (in French)
- Discipline: Road
- Competition: UCI Europe Tour (2005-2025); UCI ProSeries (2026-)
- Type: Stage race
- Web site: www.regionpaysdelaloire-tour.fr

History
- First edition: 1953
- Editions: 71 (as of 2025)
- First winner: Jacky Hays (FRA)
- Most wins: Jean-Pierre Danguillaume (FRA) (3 wins)
- Most recent: Kévin Vauquelin (FRA)

History (women)
- First winner: Michaela Drummond (NZL)
- Most recent: Michaela Drummond (NZL)

The Région Pays de la Loire Tour, formerly Circuit de la Sarthe-Pays de la Loire, (English: Circuit of Sarthe) is an early-season short road bicycle racing stage race held annually in Sarthe, Pays de la Loire, France. From 2005 to 2025, it has been organised as a 2.1 event on the UCI Europe Tour. Since 2026, the race has been upgraded to UCI ProSeries and rated as 2.Pro event. A women's edition has been held since 2024 as a category 1.2 one-day event.

Between 1953 and 1974 it was an amateur race, becoming a professional race in 1975.

== Winners ==
=== Men ===
Year	Country	Rider	Team
1953	France	Jacky Hays	V.C. Tours
1954	France	Bernard Fournières	La Suze
1955	France	André Bernard	Couêmon
1956	France	Jean Danguillaume	A.V.T.
1957	France	Raymond Guérin	C.O.P.
1958	France	Jean Danguillaume	A.V.T.
1959	France	Jean Danguillaume	A.V.T.
1960	France	André Foucher	Rennes
1961	France	Jean Jeugnet	V.C. Tours
1963	France	Claude Juin	U.V. Aube
1964	France	Jean Cosseron	Pelforth
1965	Spain	José Manuel López-Rodríguez	Spain (national team)
1966	France	Pierre Matignon	Bières 33
1967	France	Guy Grimbert	Pampryl
1968	France	Guy Grimbert	Caen
1969	Poland	Ryszard Jan Szurkowski	Poland (national team)
1970	France	Claude Lechatelier	France (national team)
1971	Soviet Union	Vladislav Nelyubin	U.S.S.R. (national team)
1972	France	Régis Ovion	Athletic Club de Boulogne-Billancourt
1973	Soviet Union	Nikolay Gorelov	U.S.S.R. (national team)
1974	Soviet Union	Ivan Skosyrev	U.S.S.R. (national team)
1975	France	Bernard Hinault	Gitane–Campagnolo
1976	France	Bernard Hinault	Gitane–Campagnolo
1977	Soviet Union	Aavo Pikkuus	U.S.S.R. (national team)
1978	East Germany	Bernd Drogan	East Germany (national team)
1979	France	Christian Muselet	La Redoute–Motobécane
1980	United States	Greg LeMond	United States (national team)
1981	Soviet Union	Yuri Barinov	U.S.S.R. (national team)
1982	Soviet Union	Ivan Mitchenko	U.S.S.R. (national team)
1983	France	Pascal Jules	Renault–Elf
1984	France	Claude Moreau	Coop–Hoonved
1985	France	Pascal Jules	Renault–Elf
1986	France	Didier Garcia	Peugeot–Shell–Velo Talbot
1987	Soviet Union	Piotr Ugrumov	U.S.S.R. (national team)
1988	France	Thierry Marie	Système U
1989	France	Thierry Laurent	RMO
1990	Soviet Union	Dimitri Zhdanov	U.S.S.R. (national team)
1991	France	Bruno Cornillet	Z–Peugeot
1992	France	Jean-François Bernard	Banesto
1993	France	Jean-François Bernard	Banesto
1994	France	Stéphane Heulot	Banesto
1995	France	Thierry Marie	Castorama
1996	Italy	Adriano Baffi	Mapei–GB
1997	Spain	Melcior Mauri	ONCE
1998	Spain	Melcior Mauri	ONCE
1999	Norway	Steffen Kjærgaard	Team Chicky World
2000	Spain	David Cañada	ONCE–Deutsche Bank
2001	Great Britain	David Millar	Cofidis
2002	France	Didier Rous	Bonjour
2003	France	Carlos Da Cruz	FDJeux.com
2004	Sweden	Thomas Löfkvist	FDJeux.com
2005	France	Sylvain Chavanel	Cofidis
2006	Germany	Stefan Schumacher	Gerolsteiner
2007	Germany	Andreas Klöden	Astana
2008	France	Thomas Voeckler	Bouygues Télécom
2009	France	David Lelay	Agritubel
2010	Spain	Luis León Sánchez	Caisse d'Epargne
2011	France	Anthony Roux	FDJ
2012	Australia	Luke Durbridge	GreenEDGE
2013	France	Pierre Rolland	Team Europcar
2014	Lithuania	Ramūnas Navardauskas	Garmin–Sharp
2015	Lithuania	Ramūnas Navardauskas	Cannondale–Garmin
2016	France	Marc Fournier	FDJ
2017	France	Lilian Calmejane	Direct Énergie
2018	France	Guillaume Martin	Wanty–Groupe Gobert
2019	France	Alexis Gougeard	AG2R La Mondiale
2020	No race due to COVID-19 pandemic		
2021	No race due to COVID-19 pandemic		
2022	Netherlands	Olav Kooij	Team Jumbo–Visma
2023	Denmark	Alexander Kamp	Tudor Pro Cycling Team
2024	Netherlands	Marijn van den Berg	EF Education–EasyPost
2025	France	Kévin Vauquelin	Arkéa–B&B Hotels

=== Women ===
Year	Country	Rider	Team
2024	New Zealand	Michaela Drummond	Arkéa–B&B Hotels Women
