= Bellaterra (Barcelona–Vallès Line) =

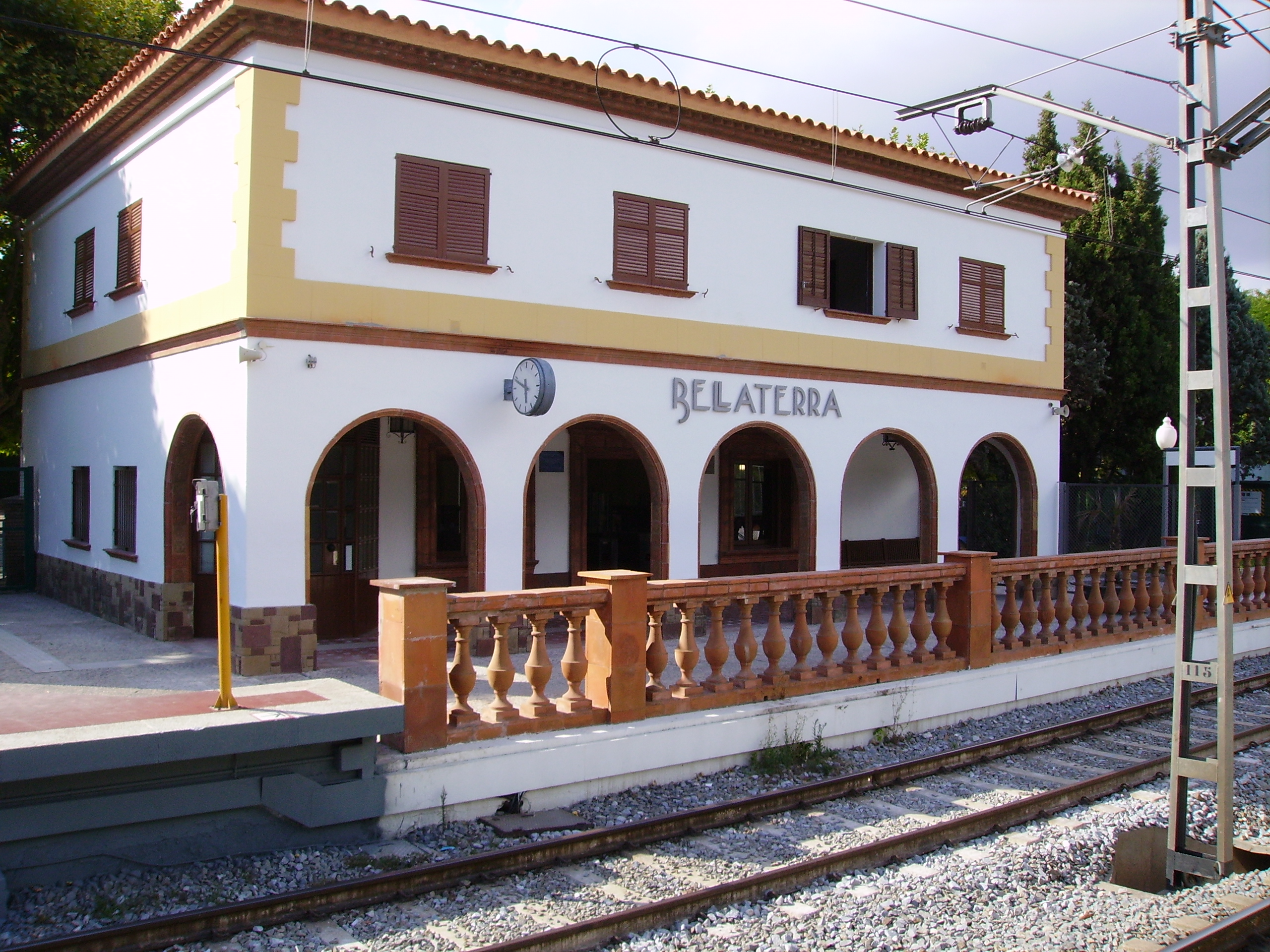

General information
- Location: Spain
- Coordinates: 41.50092°N 2.09044°E
- System: commuter station
- Owner: FGC
- Line: S2, S6

Construction
- Structure type: Above ground

History
- Opened: 22 Jun 1930
- Rebuilt: 1984

Passengers
- 2018: 549,239

Services
Preceding station	FGC	Following station
Sant Joan towards Barcelona Pl. Catalunya	S2	Autonomous University towards Sabadell Parc del Nord
Sant Joan towards Barcelona Pl. Catalunya	S6	Autonomous University Terminus
Location

Bellaterra is a railway station on the Sabadell branch of the Barcelona-Vallès line of the FGC, located in the Bellaterra neighborhood of Cerdanyola del Vallès, about 17 km from Barcelona in Spain.

Construction began in 1929 and the station opened on 22 June 1930. In 1984, a third track was built as part of a new single-track shuttle service to the new station serving the Autonomous University of Barcelona (UAB), which was later doubled-tracked and re-routed through it in 1995.

This station is the closest station to the UAB residential hall (Vila Universitària).
