= Flèche Halloise =

Belgian cycling race

Race details
- Date: May, June, July, September
- Region: Flanders, Belgium
- English name: Halle Arrow
- Local name(s): Halse Pijl (in Dutch)
- Discipline: Road race
- Competition: Cat. 1.2
- Type: Single-day

History
- First edition: 1950
- Editions: 22
- Final edition: 1981
- First winner: Karel De Baere (BEL)
- Most wins: Edgar Sorgeloos (BEL) (3 wins)
- Final winner: Dirk Heirweg (BEL)

The Flèche Halloise was a Belgian single-day road bicycle race organized for the last time in 1981. The name refers to the finish place Halle in Flemish Brabant.

The competition's roll of honor includes the successes of Rik Van Steenbergen and Roger De Vlaeminck.

== Winners ==
| Year | Country | Rider | Team |
|---|---|---|---|
| 1950 | Belgium | Karel De Baere | Mercier–Hutchinson |
| 1951 | Belgium | Edward Peeters | Garin–Wolber/Van Hauwaert |
| 1952 | Belgium | Edward Peeters | Garin–Wolber/Van Hauwaert |
| 1953 | Italy | Pino Cerami | Peugeot–Dunlop |
| 1954 | Belgium | Edgar Sorgeloos | Peugeot–Dunlop |
| 1955 | Belgium | Edgar Sorgeloos | Elvé–Peugeot |
| 1956 | Belgium | Edgar Sorgeloos | Elvé–Peugeot |
| 1957 | Belgium | Jozef Schils | Faema |
| 1958 | Belgium | Joseph Bosmans | Plume–Vainqueur–Regina |
| 1959 | Belgium | Rik Van Steenbergen | Elvé–Peugeot |
| 1960–1961 | No race | | |
| 1962 | Belgium | Emile Daems | Philco |
| 1963–1970 | No race | | |
| 1971 | Belgium | Frans Verbeeck | Watney–Avia |
| 1972 | Belgium | Roger De Vlaeminck | Dreher |
| 1973 | Belgium | Dirk Baert | Novy–Total |
| 1974 | Belgium | Eric Leman | Miko–de Gribaldy |
| 1975 | Belgium | Willy Teirlinck | Gitane–Campagnolo |
| 1976 | Belgium | Willy Scheers | Zoppas–Splendor–Sinalco |
| 1977 | Belgium | Willy Planckaert | Maes Pils–Mini Flat |
| 1978 | Belgium | Jos Van Der Poel | IJsboerke–Colnago |
| 1979 | Belgium | Jean-Philippe Vandenbrande | Peugeot–Esso–Michelin |
| 1980 | Belgium | Willy Teirlinck | Safir |
| 1981 | Belgium | Dirk Heirweg | Boston–Mavic |
