= Stadsprijs Geraardsbergen =

Race details
- Date: End of August
- Region: Geraardsbergen, Belgium
- Local name(s): Stadsprijs Geraardsbergen (in Dutch)
- Discipline: Road
- Type: Single-day
- Web site: www.stadsprijsgeraardsbergen.be

History
- First edition: 1912
- Editions: 103 (as of 2021)
- First winner: Aloïs Persijn (BEL)
- Most wins: Ferdi Van Den Haute (BEL) (7 wins)
- Most recent: Xandro Meurisse (BEL)

The Stadsprijs Geraardsbergen is a single-day road bicycle race held annually in August or September in Geraardsbergen, Belgium. The race was a professional cycling race, but is not listed as a UCI event.

In 2022, it was decided to replace the traditional race by one of a higher (1.2) category, called Muur Classic Geraardsbergen.

== Winners ==
Year	Country	Rider	Team
1927	Belgium	Lucien Buysse	
1933	Belgium	Alfred Haemerlinck	Dilecta
1934	Belgium	Alfred Haemerlinck	Dilecta
1935	Netherlands	Theo Middelkamp	
1938	Belgium	Antoine Dignef	
1942	Belgium	Georges Claes	
1943	Belgium	Marcel Boumon	
1946	Belgium	Albert Ritserveldt	
1947	Belgium	Michel Remue	
1948	Belgium	Auguste Van Gaever	
1949	Belgium	Emiel Faignaert	
1950	Belgium	Michel Decroix	
1951	Belgium	Basiel Wambeke	
1952	Belgium	Leopold Degraveleyn	
1953	Belgium	Omer Braekevelt	
1954	Belgium	Gérard Devogel	
1956	Belgium	Michel Van Aerde	
1957	Belgium	Michel Van Aerde	
1958	Belgium	Richard Van Genechten	
1959	Belgium	Frans Aerenhouts	
1960	Belgium	Roger De Koninck	
1961	Belgium	René Van Meenen	
1962	Belgium	Jacques De Boever	
1963	Belgium	Willy Bocklant	
1964	Belgium	Jef Planckaert	
1965	Belgium	Jacques De Boever	
1966	Belgium	Bernard Van De Kerckhove	
1967	Belgium	Jean-Marie Gorez	
1968	Belgium	André Hendryckx	
1969	Belgium	Julien Van Lint	
1970	Belgium	Julien Van Lint	
1971	Belgium	Eddy Merckx	Molteni
1972	Belgium	Dirk Baert	
1973	Belgium	Jos Huysmans	Molteni
1974	Belgium	Willy Teirlinck	
1975	Belgium	Marc Demeyer	
1976	Belgium	Michel Pollentier	
1977	Belgium	Ferdi Van Den Haute	
1978	Belgium	Ferdi Van Den Haute	
1979	Belgium	Eric Van de Wiele	
1980	Belgium	Ferdi Van Den Haute	
1981	Belgium	Marc Goossens	
1982	Belgium	Rudy Pevenage	Capri Sonne
1983	Belgium	Ferdi Van Den Haute	
1984	Belgium	Ferdi Van Den Haute	
1985	Belgium	Ferdi Van Den Haute	
1986	Belgium	Ferdi Van Den Haute	
1987	Belgium	Dirk Demol	
1988	Australia	Allan Peiper	Panasonic–Isostar–Colnago–Agu
1989	Netherlands	Patrick Tolhoek	Superconfex–Yoko
1990	Belgium	Dirk Heirweg	
1991	Netherlands	Marco van der Hulst	
1992	Belgium	Hendrik Redant	
1993	Belgium	Edwig Van Hooydonck	Wordperfect
1994	Belgium	Serge Baguet	Lotto
1995	Ukraine	Andrei Tchmil	Lotto–Isoglass
1996	Belgium	Andy De Smet	
1997	Belgium	Robbie Vandaele	
1998	Belgium	Koen Beeckman	
1999	Belgium	Tony Bracke	
2000	Belgium	Serge Baguet	Lotto–Adecco
2001	Netherlands	Berry Hoedemakers	
2002	Belgium	Erwin Thijs	Palmans–Collstrop
2003	Belgium	Kevin Van der Slagmolen	
2004	Belgium	Sjef De Wilde	
2005	Australia	Robbie McEwen	Davitamon–Lotto
2006	Belgium	Bert Scheirlinckx	
2007	Belgium	Thomas De Gendt	Davo
2008	Netherlands	Dirk Bellemakers	
2009	Belgium	Steven Caethoven	Agritubel
2010	Belgium	Michael Van Staeyen	Topsport Vlaanderen–Mercator
2011	Netherlands	Jos van Emden	Rabobank
2012	Belgium	Bjorn Leukemans	Vacansoleil–DCM
2013	Belgium	Nicolas Vereecken	An Post–Chain Reaction
2014	Belgium	Dennis Coenen	Leopard Development Team
2015	Belgium	Bjorn Leukemans	Wanty–Groupe Gobert
2016	Estonia	Mihkel Räim	Cycling Academy
2017	Belgium	Xandro Meurisse	Wanty–Groupe Gobert
2018	Belgium	Alfdan De Decker	Wanty–Groupe Gobert
2018	Norway	Håkon Aalrust	Team Coop
2020	No race due to COVID-19 pandemic in Belgium		
2021	Belgium	Xandro Meurisse	Alpecin–Fenix
2022	Netherlands	Mathieu van der Poel	Alpecin–Fenix
