= Jean-Pierre Biderre =

French cyclist

Personal information
- Born: 15 June 1950 (age 76)

Cycling career
- Sport: Cycling
- Role: Rider

Jean-Pierre Biderre (born 15 June 1950) is a French racing cyclist. He rode in the 1978 Tour de France.
