= Alain Budet =

French cyclist

Personal information
- Born: 7 October 1952 (age 74)

Cycling career
- Sport: Cycling
- Role: Rider

Alain Budet (born 7 October 1952) is a French racing cyclist. He rode in the 1978 Tour de France.
