= Didier Van Vlaslaer =

French cyclist

Personal information
- Born: 8 February 1955 (age 71)

Cycling career
- Sport: Cycling
- Role: Rider

Didier Van Vlaslaer (born 8 February 1955) is a French racing cyclist. He rode in the 1978 Tour de France.
