= Hervé Inaudi =

French cyclist

Personal information
- Born: 4 December 1952 (age 73)

Cycling career
- Sport: Cycling
- Role: Rider

Hervé Inaudi (born 4 December 1952) is a French racing cyclist. He rode in the 1978 Tour de France.
