= Jean Danguillaume =

French cyclist (1932–2025)

Personal information
- Born: 31 October 1932 Paris, France
- Died: 4 September 2025 (aged 92)

Cycling career
- Sport: Cycling

Amateur teams
- 1951: VC Courbevoie-Asnières
- 1953–1960: AC Tours
- 1961–1962: UC Châteauroux
- 1964–1965: AV Tours

Professional team
- 1953–1955: La Perle-Hutchinson

Jean Danguillaume (French: [ʒɑ̃ dɑ̃ɡijom]; 31 October 1932 – 4 September 2025) was a French cyclist.

Danguillaume won the Poitiers-Saumur-Poitiers in 1954, the Région Pays de la Loire Tour in 1956, 1958, and 1959, the Tour d'Eure-et-Loir in 1957, the Circuit des Deux Ponts in 1960, and the Grand Prix de Montamisé in 1961. His brothers Camille, André, Roland, and Marcel were also cyclists, as were his nephews Jean-Pierre and Jean-Louis.

Danguillaume died on 4 September 2025, at the age of 92.

== Awards ==
- Orleans Championship, 1952
- Région Pays de la Loire Tour, 1959.
- Tour d'Eure-et-Loir, 1957
- Région Pays de la Loire Tour, 1958
