= Jacky Hardy =

French cyclist

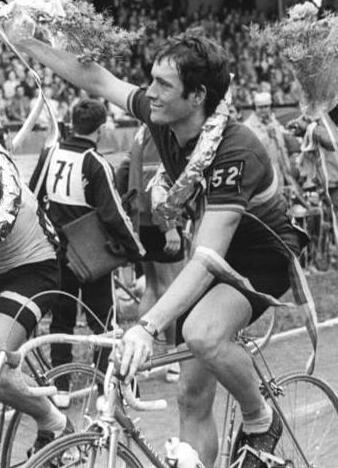
- Hardy in the Peace Race 1977

Personal information
- Born: 29 August 1953 (age 73)

Cycling career
- Sport: Cycling
- Role: Rider

Jacky Hardy (born 26 August 1953) is a French racing cyclist. He rode in the 1978 Tour de France.
