= Alain De Carvalho =

French cyclist

Personal information
- Born: 9 June 1953 (age 73) Ussel, France

Cycling career
- Sport: Cycling
- Role: Rider

Alain De Carvalho (born 9 June 1953) is a former French racing cyclist. He rode in four editions of the Tour de France between 1978 and 1981.
