= Christian Muselet =

French cyclist

Personal information
- Born: 18 April 1952 (age 74)

Cycling career
- Sport: Cycling
- Role: Rider

Christian Muselet (born 18 April 1952) is a French racing cyclist. He rode in the 1978 Tour de France.
