= Paulino Martínez (cyclist) =

Spanish cyclist

Personal information
- Born: 31 August 1952 (age 74) Burgos, Spain

Cycling career
- Sport: Cycling
- Role: Rider

Paulino Martínez (born 31 August 1952) is a former Spanish racing cyclist. He rode in four Grand Tours between 1978 and 1981. He also competed in the road race event at the 1976 Summer Olympics.
