= Dante Coccolo =

French cyclist

Personal information
- Born: 27 January 1954 (age 72) Toulouse, France

Cycling career
- Sport: Cycling
- Discipline: Bicycle racer
- Role: Rider

Dante Coccolo (born 27 January 1954 in Toulouse) is a French professional bicycle racer, now known primarily for one incident during the Tour de France.

== Controversy ==
In the 1978 Tour, during the Bordeaux-Biarritz stage, Coccolo violated racing protocol by attacking while the peloton had slowed for a bathroom break. This was not the first time Coccolo had done so during a race.

According to former pro and cycling commentator Paul Sherwen, the peloton took their revenge later in the stage: "When it was Coccolo's turn for his own bathroom break and he put his bike down on the grass verge, a couple guys slowed down and grabbed the bike. They wheeled it down the road for a kilometer or two and tossed it into a ditch. Everyone in the peloton was very happy about it."

Coccolo emerged from the woods to find his bike gone, and had to wait five minutes for his team car to retrieve him. In the spirit of the moment, his team manager put Coccolo on the hood of the car and drove him down the road to retrieve the bike. Coccolo finished second to last that year in the Tour, and never rode the Tour again.

== Teams ==
- 1978: Jobo - Spidel
- 1979: Les Amis du Tour

Wins as a professional: none

== Sources ==
- Paul Hochman, Pack mentality: Cut deals with the enemy, maximize liquidity, punish the Welshers, and other free-market lessons of the typical bike race, FORTUNE, June 1, 2006
