= Ferdi Van Den Haute =

Belgian cyclist

Personal information
- Full name: Ferdi Van Den Haute
- Born: 5 July 1952 (age 74) Deftinge, Belgium

Cycling career
- Sport: Cycling
- Discipline: Road/Track
- Role: Rider

Major wins
- 1 stage Tour de France

Ferdi Van Den Haute (born 5 July 1952) is a Belgian former professional road bicycle racer competing from 1976 to 1987.

== Major results ==
1974
Belgium National Amateur Track Pursuit Championship
Belgium National Amateur Track Madison Championship (with Raphael Constant)
1975
Belgium National Amateur Track Pursuit Championship
Belgium National Amateur Track Madison Championship (with Marc Meernhout)
Circuit du Hainaut
Tour de Liège
Tour de Namur
1976
Essen
Izegem
Mere
Belgium National Amateur Track Omnium Championship
Omloop van Oost-Vlaanderen
Vinkt
Vuelta a España:

Winner stage 7

Kruishoutem
Belgium National Track Omnium Championship (with Patrick Sercu)
1977
Nederbrakel
Stadsprijs Geraardsbergen
Woesten
Belgium National Track Madison Championship (with Patrick Sercu)
Geraardsbergen
1978
GP Franco-Belge
Innsbrück
Stadsprijs Geraardsbergen
Vuelta a España:

Winner stages 3 and 9
Winner points classification

Wattrelos - Meulebeke
Gent–Wevelgem
Aartrijke
1979
Tour de l'Aude
Wezembeek-Oppem
1980
Aalst
Flèche Picarde
Belgium National Track Omnium Championship
Stadsprijs Geraardsbergen
1981
Grand Prix de Denain
Omloop der Vlaamse Ardennen
1982
Kaprijke
Moerbeke
1983
Belgium National Track Omnium Championship
Stadsprijs Geraardsbergen
1984
Stadsprijs Geraardsbergen
Tour de France:

Winner stage 4

Grand Prix of Aargau Canton
Flèche Picarde
Grand Prix de Fourmies
1985
Ronde van Midden-Zeeland
Stadsprijs Geraardsbergen
Herzele
1986
Stadsprijs Geraardsbergen
(Belgium) Belgian National Road Race Championships
1987
Oostende
Ronse
