= Marc (cycling team) =

Team information
- Registered: Belgium
- Founded: 1978
- Disbanded: 1980
- Discipline: Road

Key personnel
- General manager: Patrick Lefevere (1980)

Team name history
- 1978 1979 1980 1980 Tour de France: Marc Zeepcentrale–Superia; Marc Zeep Savon–Superia; Marc–Carlos–V.R.D.–Woningbouw; Marc–IWC–V.R.D.
Marc jersey
Jersey

Marc was a Belgian professional cycling team that existed from 1978 to 1980.
