= José Luis Mayoz =

Spanish cyclist

Personal information
- Born: 15 January 1954 (age 72)

Cycling career
- Sport: Cycling
- Role: Rider

José Luis Mayoz (born 15 January 1954) is a Spanish racing cyclist. He rode in the 1980 Tour de France.
