= Jos Schipper =

Dutch racing cyclist

Personal information
- Born: 10 June 1951 (age 75) Utrecht, Netherlands

Cycling career
- Sport: Cycling
- Role: Rider

Jos Schipper (born 10 June 1951) is a former Dutch racing cyclist. He rode in four Grand Tours between 1978 and 1982.
