= Bellaterra =

Municipality in Catalonia

Coordinates: 41°30′05″N 2°05′28″E

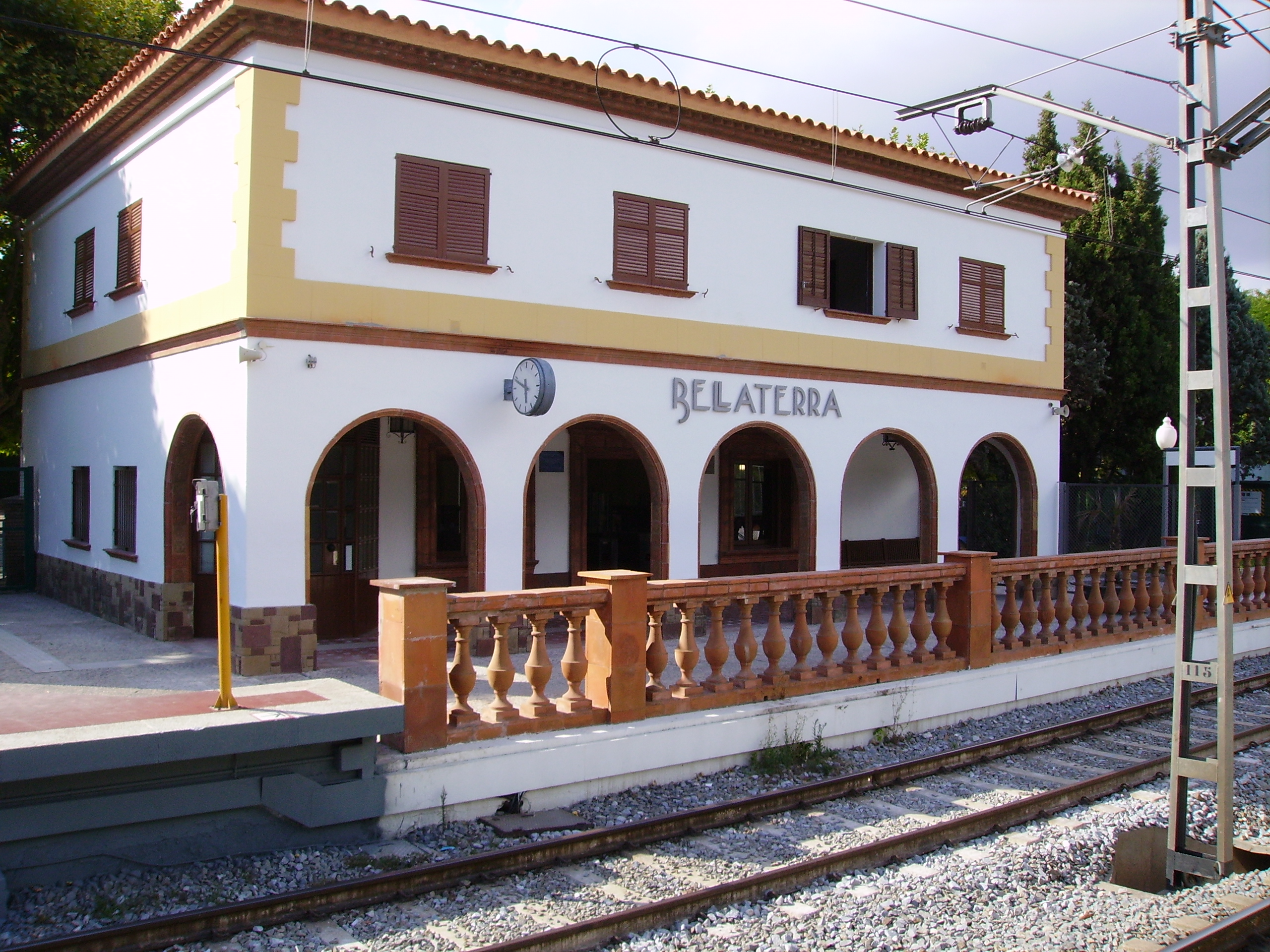
The Bellaterra train station.

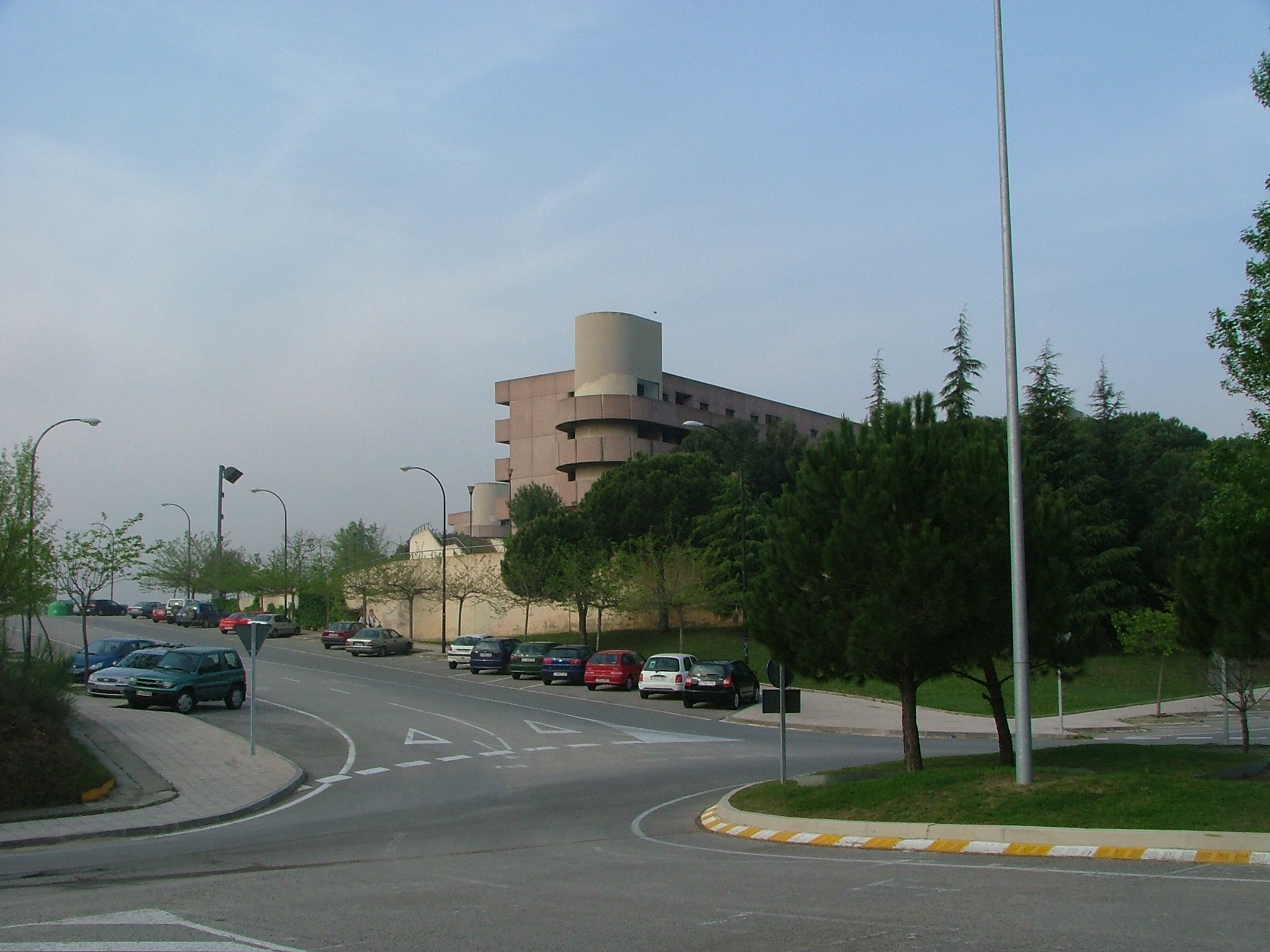
UAB campus in Bellaterra.

Bellaterra (Catalan pronunciation: [ˌbeʎəˈtɛrə]) is a decentralized municipal entity of Cerdanyola del Vallès, in the metropolitan area of Barcelona (Catalonia, Spain). It is best known for being the location of the Universitat Autònoma de Barcelona (UAB).

The urbanisation of the neighbourhood started in 1929 when a pharmacist, Bartomeu, leased land from his father-in-law and built the Bellaterra railway station on the Barcelona–Vallès Line (then operated by the Ferrocarrils de Catalunya or FCC; now by the FGC).

In the central area of Bellaterra is the Park of El Pedregar de Bellaterra, a garden-museum of some 1.2 hectares (3.0 acres). Within the park is a restaurant, large gardens, water sources and waterfalls with sculptures by artists as Subirachs, Crespo Rivera, Vicente Larrea, Vasallo, Charles Collet or Perceval, as well as Arcadians of Carrara's marble and amphitheatre / audience outdoors for 150 persons. Also in the core one finds the parish of the Holy Creu. Between Bellaterra and Serraperera's core, one finds the campus of the Universitat Autònoma of Barcelona, built in 1968 and inaugurated in the year 1971. At the present moment Bellaterra is undergoing an administrative status change into a decentralised municipal entity (EMD).

== See also ==
- Universitat Autònoma de Barcelona
