= Willy Teirlinck =

Belgian cyclist

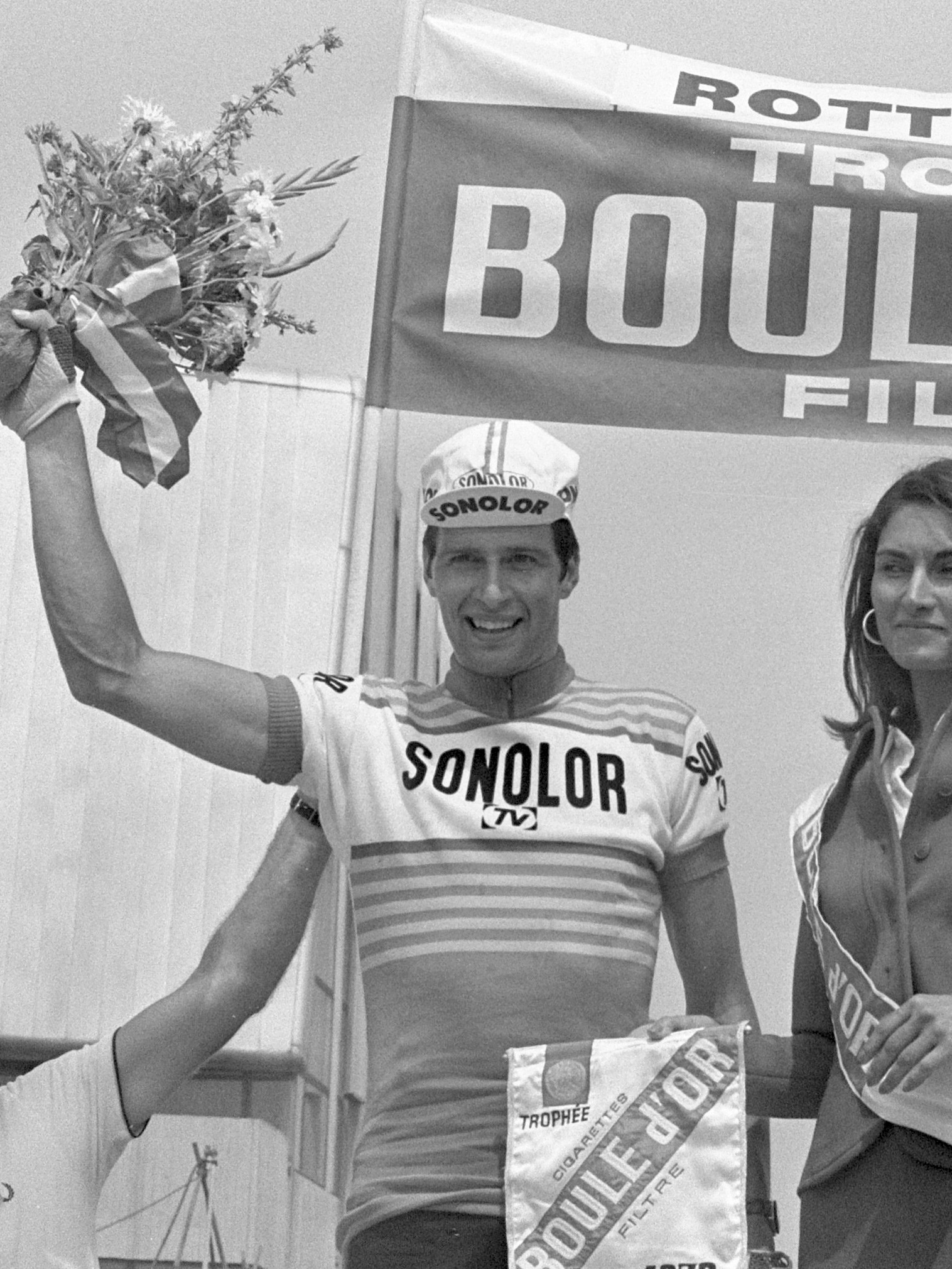
- Teirlinck after winning the 1st stage of Tour de France in 1973

Personal information
- Full name: Willy Teirlinck
- Born: 10 August 1948 (age 78) Teralfene, Belgium

Cycling career
- Sport: Cycling
- Current team: Retired
- Discipline: Road
- Role: Rider

Professional teams
- 1970–1977: Sonolor–Lejeune
- 1978: Renault–Gitane–Campagnolo
- 1979: Kas–Campagnolo
- 1980: Safir–Ludo
- 1981: Boston–Mavic
- 1982–1983: Bouwwerken–De Freddy
- 1984–1985: Eurosoap–Crack
- 1986: Sigma

Major wins
- Grand Tours Tour de France 5 individual stages (1972, 1973, 1976, 1979) Intermediate sprints classification (1972, 1979) Vuelta a España 2 individual stages (1978) Stage races Tour de Picardie (1977, 1978) One-day races and Classics National Road Race Championship (1975) Grand Prix de Denain (1974) Grand Prix de Fourmies (1974) Grand Prix Pino Cerami (1976) Brussels–Ingooigem (1984)

Willy Teirlinck (born 10 August 1948) is a retired Belgian road cyclist. He was professional from 1970 to 1986 and won 96 races. In 1975 he won the national title on the road. Teirlinck rode the Tour de France ten times and won three stages in 1972, one stage and one day in the yellow jersey as leader of the general classification in 1973, and one stage in 1976. His other victories include individual stages of the Vuelta a España, Deutschland Tour, Étoile de Bessèges, Tour de Luxembourg, Tour de l'Oise as well as one day races Grand Prix Pino Cerami, Grand Prix de Fourmies and the Grand Prix de Denain. An annual cycling event Willy Teirlinck Classic takes place in his honor in Liedekerke.

== Major results ==
1969
3rd Ronde van Vlaanderen U23
1970
1st Stage 4 Tour d'Algérie
1st Grand Prix des Marbriers
3rd Belgian National Road Race Championships Amateur road race
1971
1st De Kustpijl
Étoile des Espoirs

1st Stages 1, 3 and 4

1st Sint-Amands
1972
Tour de France:

1st Intermediate sprints classification
1st Stages 10, 16 and 20b

1st Stage 2 Tour du Nord
1st Wattrelos
1st Machelen
1973
Tour de France

1st Stage 1a
Held for 1 day

2nd Overall Étoile des Espoirs

1st Stage 5b (ITT)

1st Liedekerkse Pijl
1st Oradour-sur-Glane
1st fr:Grand Prix d'Orchies
1st Sin-le-Noble
1st Ruisbroek
2nd GP Union Dortmund
2nd Leeuwse Pijl
3rd Brussels-Meulebeke
1974
1st Stadsprijs Geraardsbergen
1st Grand Prix de Denain
1st Ruisbroek
1st Grand Prix de Fourmies
1st Stage 4 Tour de Luxembourg
2nd Overall Étoile des Espoirs

1st Stage 1

1975
1st National Road Championships Road race
1st Halse Pijl
2nd Overall Tour de Luxembourg
2nd Halle–Ingooigem
2nd Nokere Koerse
2nd Leeuwse Pijl
3rd Overall Tour de l'Oise

1st Stage 3

1976
Tour de France

1st Stage 13

1st Grand Prix Pino Cerami
1st Les Herbiers
Tour de l'Aude

1st Stages 2 and 5

1st Bredene
1st Ronse
1st Eeklo
2nd Liedekerkse Pijl
3rd National Road Championships Road race
1977
1st Overall Tour de l'Oise

1st Stage 3b

1st Stage 3 Tour de l'Aude
3rd Overall Étoile des Espoirs

1st Stage 1

1st Bricqueville
1st Teralfene
1st Merchtem
1st Wetteren
2nd Paris–Roubaix
2nd Halle–Ingooigem
3rd Brabantse Pijl
3rd fr:Circuit de l'Indre
3rd Ninove
1978
Vuelta a España:

1st Stages 5 and 10

1st Overall Tour de l'Oise
1st Teralfene
2nd National Road Championships Road race
1979
Tour de France

1st Intermediate sprints classification

Vuelta a Aragón

1st Stages 1 and 5b (ITT)

1st Herne
1st nl:Criterium van Buggenhout
2nd Tour of Leuven
2nd Grote Prijs Jef Scherens
3rd Nationale Sluitingsprijs
1980
1st Halse Pijl
1st Stage 2 Paris–Bourges
1st Stage 4 Deutschland Tour
1st Omloop Hageland-Zuiderkempen
1st Geraardsbergen-Viane
1st Teralfene
1st Sint-Martens-Lierde
1st Ninove
1st GP Betekom
2nd Grand Prix of Aargau Canton
3rd GP Frans Verbeeck | 1.2
1981
1st Ninove
1st Grote Prijs Marcel Kint
1st Ninove
1st Strombeek-Bever
1st Zwevegem
1st Sombreffe
2nd Omloop van het Waasland
2nd Scheldeprijs
2nd Liedekerkse Pijl
1982
1st Circuit des Frontières
1st Sint-Gillis-Waas
1st Kampioenschap van Brabant
1st Hyon-Mons
2nd Liedekerkse Pijl
3rd Grote 1-MeiPrijs
1983
1st Trofee Luc Van Biesen
1st Liedekerkse Pijl
1st Circuit de Niel
1st Baasrode
1st Eeklo
1st Houthulst
1st Wezembeek-Oppem
1st Bonheiden
1st Willebroek
1st Wetteren
1st Boom
2nd Maaslandse Pijl
3rd Halle–Ingooigem
3rd Omloop van West-Brabant
1984
1st Halle–Ingooigem
1st Beveren-Waas
1st Gullegem Koerse
1st Alken
1st Wachtebeke
1st Vilvoorde-Houtem
2nd Ninove
1985
1st GP Stad Vilvoorde
1st Kampioenschap van Oost-Vlaanderen
1st Polders-Kempen
1st GP Benego
1st Overmere
1st Omloop Groot Oostende
1st Humbeek
1st Omloop van de Vlasstreek
2nd Omloop Mandel-Leie-Schelde
1986
1st Moorsele
1st Willebroek
1st Geetbets
