= André Chalmel =

French cyclist (born 1949)

Personal information
- Born: 10 October 1949 (age 77) Dol-de-Bretagne (Ille-et-Vilaine), Brittany

Cycling career
- Sport: Cycling
- Discipline: Road
- Role: Rider

Major wins
- Bordeaux–Paris

André Chalmel (born 10 October 1949) is a French former road racing cyclist, born in Dol-de-Bretagne (Ille-et-Vilaine, Brittany). He was, during a few years, one of Bernard Hinault's team-mates on the Renault–Elf–Gitane professional cycling team. He is a former winner of Bordeaux–Paris (in 1979). He was also a medalist in the French professional national road championships.

He was previously president of the National Union of Professional Cyclists (l'Union Nationale des Cyclistes Professionels) in 1980. He currently serves on the committee of the Bretagne cycling federation and is an honorary member of VC St Malo.
