= Bernardo Alfonsel =

Spanish cyclist

Personal information
- Full name: Bernardo Alfonsel Lopez
- Born: 24 February 1954 (age 72) Madrid, Spain

Cycling career
- Sport: Cycling
- Role: Rider

Bernardo Alfonsel Lopez (born 24 February 1954) is a Spanish former racing cyclist. He rode in seven editions of the Tour de France and seven editions of the Vuelta a España between 1977 and 1986. He also rode in the road race event at the 1976 Summer Olympics.
