= Fons van Katwijk =

Dutch cyclist

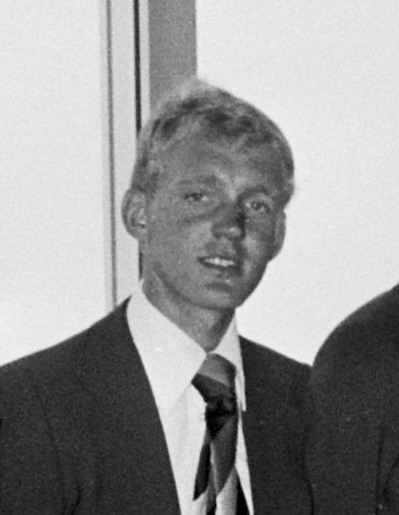
- Fons van Katwijk in 1976

Personal information
- Born: 1 December 1951 (age 74) Oploo, the Netherlands
- Height: 1.81 m (5 ft 11 in)
- Weight: 75 kg (165 lb)

Sport
- Sport: Cycling

Achievements and titles
- Olympic finals: 1976

Alphonsus Wilhelmus Franciscus "Fons" van Katwijk (born 1 December 1951) is a retired Dutch cyclist who was active between 1971 and 1987. He competed at the 1976 Summer Olympics and finished in 17th place in the 100 km team time trial (with Frits Pirard, Adri van Houwelingen and Arie Hassink). He won the Flèche du Sud (1971) and the Kampioenschap van Vlaanderen (1979) and individual stages of the Olympia's Tour (1976), Vuelta a Aragón (1977), Vuelta a España (1978), Étoile de Bessèges (1979) and Ronde van Nederland (1983).

His brothers Piet and Jan, nephew Alain and daughter Nathalie were also professional cyclists.

== See also ==
- List of Dutch Olympic cyclists
