= Eulalio García =

Spanish cyclist

Personal information
- Full name: Eulalio García Pereda
- Born: 11 May 1951 (age 75) Casillas, Spain

Cycling career
- Sport: Cycling
- Current team: Retired
- Discipline: Road
- Role: Rider

Professional teams
- 1976–1977: Kas–Campagnolo
- 1978–1981: Teka
- 1982–1984: Reynolds

Eulalio García Pereda (born 11 May 1951) is a former Spanish cyclist.

== Major results ==
1975
1st Overall Vuelta a Navarra
1976
1st Stage 1 Vuelta a Cantabria
2nd GP Vizcaya
3rd Klasika Primavera
1977
1st Stages 1 & 3 Vuelta a La Rioja
3rd Overall GP Leganes

1st Stage 1

1978
1st Prologue & Stage 1A Vuelta a La Rioja
1st Prologue & Stage 4B Vuelta a Cantabria
2nd Overall GP Leganes

1st Stages 2 & 3

2nd Trofeo Elola
4th Overall Vuelta a España
1979
1st Overall Vuelta a La Rioja
3rd Overall Volta a la Comunitat Valenciana
1980
1st Stage 8 Vuelta a España
1st Overall Vuelta a Cantabria

1st Stage 1a

2nd GP Navarre
3rd Overall Vuelta a La Rioja

1st Stage 3

3rd Overall Vuelta a Andalucía
1981
1st National Road Race Championships
1st Campeonato de España de Fondo
2nd Clásica de Sabiñánigo
2nd Overall Vuelta a Cantabria
2nd Overall Vuelta a Burgos

1st Stage 5

2nd Klasika Primavera
2nd GP Pascuas
1982
2nd National Road Race Championships
2nd GP Pascuas
2nd Klasika Primavera
3rd Overall Vuelta a La Rioja
1983
1st Stage 1 Vuelta a La Rioja
1984
2nd GP Llodio
