= Francisco Elorriaga =

Spanish cyclist (born 1947)

Francisco Javier Elorriaga
Personal information
- Full name: Francisco Javier Elorriaga Iturriagagoitia
- Born: 3 December 1947 (age 78) Abadiño, Spain

Cycling career
- Sport: Cycling
- Current team: Retired
- Discipline: Road
- Role: Rider

Professional teams
- 1972–1975: Kas–Kaskol
- 1976: Super Ser
- 1977–1978: Teka
- 1979: Novostil–Helios
- 1980: Flavia–Gios

Francisco Javier Elorriaga Iturriagagoitia (born 3 December 1947) is a Spanish former professional cyclist. He competed in the individual road race at the 1972 Summer Olympics.

== Major results ==
1971
Mediterranean Games

1st Team time trial
1st Road race

1973
1st GP Llodio
1st Trofeo Masferrer
1st Stage 3 Vuelta a Andalucía
1st Stage 3 Tour of the Basque Country
1st Stage 2 Vuelta a Asturias
3rd Overall Vuelta a Aragón

1st Stages 4 & 5

1974
1st Overall Vuelta a Aragón

1st Stage 1

1st Stages 3 & 4 Vuelta a Cantabria
3rd GP Pascuas
3rd Trofeo Masferrer
3rd Overall Vuelta a Mallorca

1st Stage 6

1975
1st Overall Vuelta a La Rioja

1st Stage 1

1st Stage 5 Vuelta a Asturias
2nd Trofeo Masferrer
2nd National Road Race Championships
1976
1st Overall Vuelta a Aragón

1st Stages 2, 4 & 7

1st Stages 2 & 4 Tour of the Basque Country
1st Stage 4 Vuelta a Cantabria
2nd GP Nuestra Senora de Oro
2nd Overall Tour of the Basque Country
2nd Klasika Primavera
2nd Trofeo Elola
3rd GP Pascuas
3rd Overall Tres Días de Leganés
1977
1st Overall Tres Días de Leganés
1st Prologue Tour of the Basque Country
1st Stage 1 Vuelta a Asturias
1st Stage 3 Vuelta a Cantabria
1st GP Caboalles de Abajo
3rd GP Navarra
1978
1st Trofeo Luis Puig
1st Stage 11 Vuelta a España
1st Prologue and Stage 2 Vuelta a Asturias
1st Stage 3 Vuelta a Cantabria
1st GP Valencia
2nd GP Navarra
3rd Overall Tres Días de Leganés
3rd GP Pascuas
1980
1st Stage 15 Vuelta a España
3rd National Road Race Championships
