= Gilbert Chaumaz =

French cyclist

Personal information
- Born: 12 January 1953 (age 73) Saint-Jean-de-Maurienne, Auvergne-Rhône-Alpes, France

Cycling career
- Sport: Cycling
- Role: Rider

Gilbert Chaumaz (born 12 January 1953) is a French racing cyclist. He rode in the 1978 Tour de France. He competed as a professional from 1977 to 1981 and participated in several major stage races, including the Tour de France and the Vuelta a España.
