= Enrique Cima =

Spanish cyclist

Personal information
- Full name: José Enrique Cima Prado
- Born: 16 June 1952 (age 74) Lugones, Spain

Cycling career
- Sport: Cycling
- Current team: Retired
- Discipline: Road
- Role: Rider

Professional teams
- 1976: Novostil–Transmallorca
- 1977–1978: Kas–Campagnolo
- 1979: Transmallorca–Flavia
- 1980: Henninger–Aquila Rossa
- 1981–1982: Teka–Campagnolo

Major wins
- Grand Tours Vuelta a España 2 individual stages (1978) Stage races Setmana Catalana de Ciclisme (1978)

José Enrique Cima Prado (born 16 June 1952) is a Spanish former cyclist.

== Major results ==
1976
1st Klasika Primavera
1st Stages 5 & 6 Volta a Catalunya
1st Stage 5b Tour of the Basque Country
1977
1st Stage 4b Vuelta a Cantabria
1st Prologue Vuelta a Levante
1st Prologue Tour de Romandie
1st Stage 2 Volta a Catalunya
1st Stage 5b Tour of the Basque Country
1st GP Vizcaya
2nd Overall Vuelta a Cantabria
2nd Prueba Villafranca de Ordizia
2nd Klasika Primavera
2nd Navarra
2nd Overall Escalada a Montjuïc
1978
1st Overall Setmana Catalana de Ciclisme

1st Stage 4

1st Stages 2 & 17 Vuelta a España
2nd Overall Tour of the Basque Country

1st Stage 5b

3rd Overall Vuelta a los Valles Mineros
3rd Overall Vuelta a Asturias

1st Stage 3

3rd GP Navarra
1981
3rd Overall Vuelta a Burgos
