= Andrés Oliva =

Spanish cyclist (1948–2023)

Personal information
- Full name: Andrés Oliva
- Born: 7 December 1948
- Died: 5 July 2023 (aged 74)

Cycling career
- Sport: Cycling
- Discipline: Race
- Role: Rider

Professional teams
- 1969–1974: La Casera
- 1975–1977: KAS
- 1978–1979: Teka
- 1980: Kelme

Major wins
- Grand Tours Giro d'Italia Mountains Classification (1975, 1976) Vuelta a España Mountains Classification (1975, 1976, 1978)

Andrés Oliva (7 December 1948 – 5 July 2023) was a Spanish professional cyclist. Oliva was a great climber, so he ended up winning multiple Mountains Classifications. He won the Mountains Classification at the 1975 Giro d'Italia and the 1976 Giro d'Italia. Those were the only two years that Oliva raced the Giro d'Italia. In the 1975 edition Oliva finished 14th overall, that was his highest finish. Oliva also experienced success at the Vuelta a España. He won the Mountains Classification at the 1975 Vuelta a España, 1976 Vuelta a España, and 1978 Vuelta a España. Oliva's highest finish at the Vuelta a España was eleventh overall, he did that in both 1978 and 1972. He retired from cycling in 1980.

Oliva died on 5 July 2023, at the age of 74.
