= Enrique Martínez Heredia =

Spanish cyclist

Personal information
- Full name: Enrique Martínez Heredia
- Born: 27 January 1953 (age 73) Huesa, Spain

Cycling career
- Sport: Cycling
- Discipline: Road
- Role: Rider

Professional teams
- 1976–1979: Kas–Campagnolo
- 1980: Teka
- 1981: Colchón CR
- 1982: Kelme–Merckx
- 1983–1984: Hueso Chocolates

Major wins
- Grand Tours Tour de France Young rider classification (1976) Vuelta a España 2 individual stages (1980, 1982) Stage races Volta a Catalunya (1976) One-day races and Classics National Road Race Championships (1978)

Enrique Martínez Heredia (born 27 January 1953 in Huesa) is a Spanish former road bicycle racer. He won the young rider classification in the 1976 Tour de France. As an amateur he won the 1974 Tour de l'Avenir. He also won the Volta a Catalunya in 1976 and the Spanish National Road Race Championship in 1978.
