= 1963 Super Prestige Pernod =

Road cycling competitions

- Fifth edition of the Super Prestige Pernod

Details
- Dates: 10 March – 19 October
- Location: Europe
- Races: 17

Champions
- Individual champion: Jacques Anquetil (FRA) (Saint-Raphaël–Gitane–R. Geminiani)

The 1963 Super Prestige Pernod was a series of races that included seventeen road cycling events. It began with the Paris–Nice on 10 March and concluded with the Giro di Lombardia on 19 October. The overall title was won by French rider Jacques Anquetil.

== Events ==
Races in the 1963 Super Prestige Pernod
Race	Date	Winner	Second	Third
(France) Paris–Nice	10–17 March	Jacques Anquetil (FRA)	Rudi Altig (FRG)	Rik Van Looy (BEL)
(Italy) Milan–San Remo	19 March	Joseph Groussard (FRA)	Rolf Wolfshohl (FRG)	Willy Schroeders (BEL)
(Belgium) Tour of Flanders	31 March	Noël Foré (BEL)	Frans Melckenbeeck (BEL)	Tom Simpson (GBR)
(France) Paris–Roubaix	7 April	Emile Daems (BEL)	Rik Van Looy (BEL)	Jan Janssen (NED)
(France) / (Belgium) Paris–Brussels	28 April	Jean Stablinski (FRA)	Tom Simpson (GBR)	Peter Post (NED)
(Spain) Vuelta a España	1–15 May	Jacques Anquetil (FRA)	José Martín Colmenarejo (ESP)	Miguel Pacheco (ESP)
(Belgium) La Flèche Wallonne	6 May	Raymond Poulidor (FRA)	Jan Janssen (NED)	Peter Post (NED)
(France) Grand Prix Stan Ockers	12 May	Willy Bocklant (BEL)	Pino Cerami (BEL)	Jean Gainche (FRA)
(Italy) Giro d'Italia	19 May – 9 June	Franco Balmamion (ITA)	Vittorio Adorni (ITA)	Giorgio Zancanaro (ITA)
(France) Bordeaux–Paris	26 May	Tom Simpson (GBR)	Piet Rentmeester (NED)	Bas Maliepaard (NED)
(France) Critérium du Dauphiné Libéré	3–9 June	Jacques Anquetil (FRA)	José Pérez Francés (ESP)	Fernando Manzaneque (ESP)
Tour de France	23 June – 14 July	Jacques Anquetil (FRA)	Federico Bahamontes (ESP)	José Pérez Francés (ESP)
(Belgium) World Championships	11 August	Benoni Beheyt (BEL)	Rik Van Looy (BEL)	Jo de Haan (NED)
(France) Grand Prix des Nations	15 September	Raymond Poulidor (FRA)	Ferdinand Bracke (BEL)	Walter Boucquet (BEL)
(France) Grand Prix du Parisien	29 September	(France) Peugeot–BP–Englebert	(France) Margnat–Paloma–Dunlop	(France) Saint-Raphaël–Gitane–R. Geminiani
(France) Paris–Tours	6 October	Jo de Roo (NED)	Tom Simpson (GBR)	Raymond Poulidor (FRA)
(Italy) Giro di Lombardia	19 October	Jo de Roo (NED)	Adriano Durante (ITA)	Michele Dancelli (ITA)

== Final standings ==
1963 Super Prestige Pernod final standings (1–10)
Rank	Cyclist	Team	Points
1	Jacques Anquetil (FRA)	Saint-Raphaël–Gitane–R. Geminiani	260
2	Tom Simpson (GBR)	Peugeot–BP–Englebert	195
3	Raymond Poulidor (FRA)	Mercier–BP–Hutchinson	180
4	Jo De Roo (NED)	Saint-Raphaël–Gitane–R. Geminiani	136
5	Rik Van Looy (BEL)	G.B.C.–Libertas	135
6	Willy Bocklant (BEL)	Flandria–Faema	122
7	José Pérez Francés (ESP)	Ferrys	85
8	Armand Desmet (BEL)	Flandria–Faema	76
9	Rolf Wolfshohl (FRG)	Peugeot–BP–Englebert	75
10	Emile Daems (BEL)	Peugeot–BP–Englebert	71
