= 1965 Liège–Bastogne–Liège =

Race details
- Dates: 2 May 1965
- Stages: 1
- Distance: 253 km (157 mi)
- Winning time: 7h 01' 04"

Results
	Winner	Carmine Preziosi (ITA)	(Pelforth–Sauvage–Lejeune)
	Second	Vittorio Adorni (ITA)	(Salvarani)
	Third	Martin Van Den Bossche (BEL)	(Wiel's–Groene Leeuw)

The 1965 Liège–Bastogne–Liège was the 51st edition of the Liège–Bastogne–Liège cycle race and was held on 2 May 1965. The race started and finished in Liège. The race was won by Carmine Preziosi of the Pelforth team.

== General classification ==
Final general classification

Rank	Rider	Team	Time
1	Carmine Preziosi (ITA)	Pelforth–Sauvage–Lejeune	7h 01' 04"
2	Vittorio Adorni (ITA)	Salvarani	+ 0"
3	Martin Van Den Bossche (BEL)	Wiel's–Groene Leeuw	+ 0"
4	Roger Cooreman (BEL)	Dr. Mann	+ 0"
5	Michael Wright (GBR)	Wiel's–Groene Leeuw	+ 0"
6	Leo Knops (NED)	Lamot–Libertas	+ 0"
7	Willy Bocklant (BEL)	Flandria–Romeo	+ 0"
8	Gilbert Desmet (BEL)	Wiel's–Groene Leeuw	+ 0"
9	Jos Huysmans (BEL)	Dr. Mann	+ 0"
10	Tom Simpson (GBR)	Peugeot–BP–Michelin	+ 0"
