= Tom Simpson =

British cyclist (1937–1967)

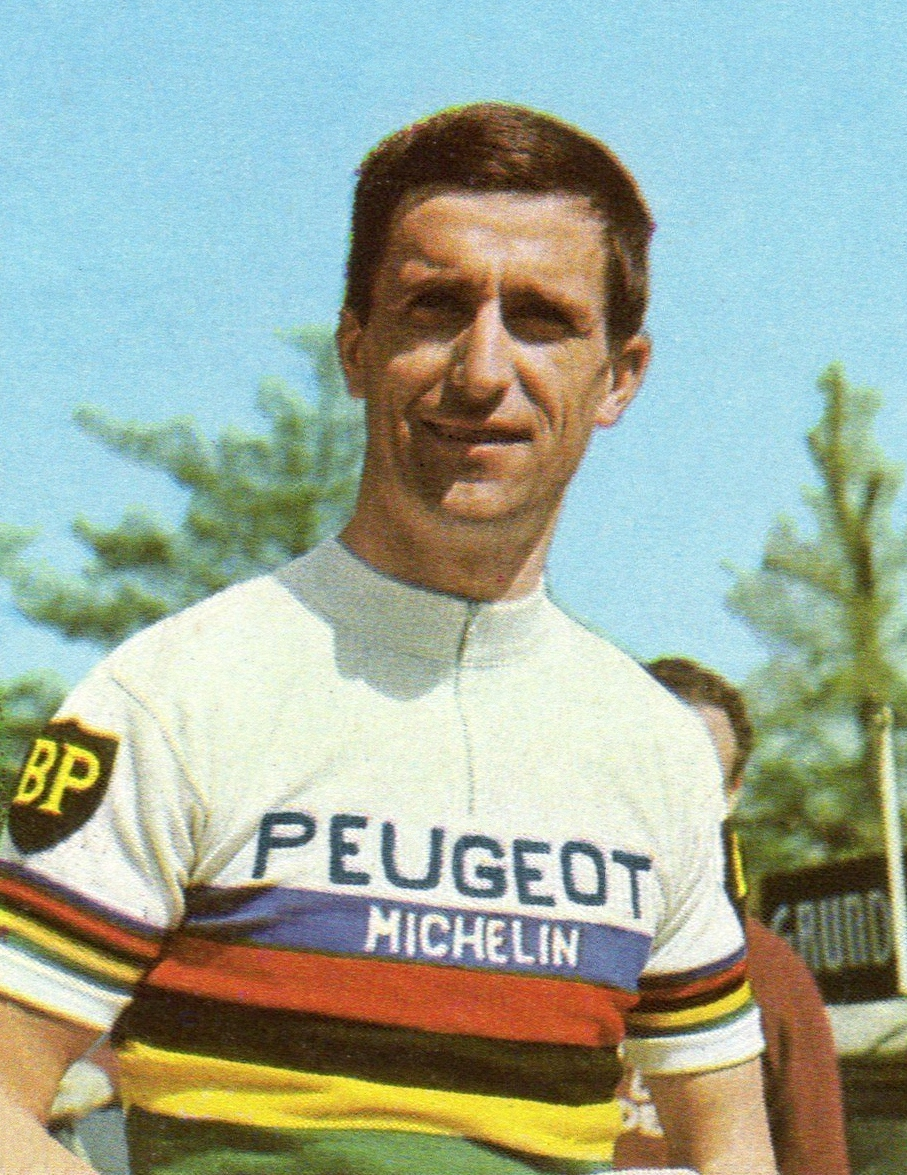
- Simpson c. 1966

Personal information
- Full name: Thomas Simpson
- Nickname: Major Simpson
- Born: 30 November 1937 Haswell, County Durham, England
- Died: 13 July 1967 (aged 29) Mont Ventoux, Vaucluse, France
- Height: 1.81 m (5 ft 11 1/2 in)
- Weight: 69 kg (152 lb; 10 st 12 lb)

Cycling career
- Sport: Cycling
- Disciplines: Road and track
- Role: Rider
- Rider type: All-rounder

Amateur teams
- –: Harworth & District CC
- –: Scala Wheelers
- –: Club Olympique Briochin
- –: Gentse Wielersport
- –: Saint-Raphaël VC 12e

Professional teams
- 1959: Saint-Raphaël–R. Geminiani–Dunlop
- 1960–1961: Rapha–Gitane–Dunlop
- 1962: Gitane–Leroux–Dunlop–R. Geminiani
- 1963–1967: Peugeot–BP–Englebert

Major wins
- Grand Tours Vuelta a España 2 individual stages (1967) Stage races Paris–Nice (1967) One-day and classic races World Road Race Championships (1965) Tour of Flanders (1961) Bordeaux–Paris (1963) Milan–San Remo (1964) Giro di Lombardia (1965)
Medal record
Representing Great Britain
Men's road bicycle racing
World Championships
Gold medal – first place	1965 San Sebastián	Road race
Olympic Games
Bronze medal – third place	1956 Melbourne	Team pursuit
Representing England
British Empire and Commonwealth Games
Silver medal – second place	1958 Cardiff	Individual pursuit

Thomas Simpson (30 November 1937 – 13 July 1967) was one of Britain's most successful professional cyclists. He was born in Haswell, County Durham, and later moved to Harworth, Nottinghamshire. Simpson began road cycling as a teenager before taking up track cycling, specialising in pursuit races. He won a bronze medal for track cycling at the 1956 Summer Olympics and a silver at the 1958 British Empire and Commonwealth Games.

In 1959, at age 21, Simpson was signed by the French professional road-racing team Saint-Raphaël–R. Geminiani–Dunlop. He advanced to their first team (Rapha–Gitane–Dunlop) the following year, and won the 1961 Tour of Flanders. Simpson then joined Gitane–Leroux–Dunlop–R. Geminiani; in the 1962 Tour de France he became the first British rider to wear the yellow jersey, finishing sixth overall.

In 1963 Simpson moved to Peugeot–BP–Englebert, winning Bordeaux–Paris that year and the 1964 Milan–San Remo. In 1965 he became Britain's first professional world road race champion and won the Giro di Lombardia; this made him the BBC Sports Personality of the Year, the first cyclist to win the award. Injuries hampered much of Simpson's 1966 season. He won two stages of the 1967 Vuelta a España before he won the general classification of Paris–Nice that year.

In the thirteenth stage of the 1967 Tour de France, Simpson collapsed and died during the ascent of Mont Ventoux. He was 29 years old. The post-mortem examination found that he had mixed amphetamines and alcohol; this diuretic combination proved fatal when combined with the heat, the hard climb of the Ventoux and a stomach complaint. A memorial near where he died has become a place of pilgrimage for many cyclists. Simpson was known to have taken performance-enhancing drugs during his career, when no doping controls existed. He is held in high esteem by many fans for his character and will to win.

== Early life and amateur career ==
=== Childhood and club racing ===
At age 12, Simpson moved from Haswell, County Durham, to Harworth on the Nottinghamshire–Yorkshire border.

Simpson was born on 30 November 1937 in Haswell, County Durham, the youngest of six children of coal miner Tom Simpson and his wife Alice (née Cheetham). His father had been a semi-professional sprinter in athletics. The family lived modestly in a small terraced house until 1943, when his parents took charge of the village's working men's club and lived above it. In 1950 the Simpsons moved to Harworth on the Nottinghamshire–Yorkshire border, where young Simpson's maternal aunt lived; new coalfields were opening, with employment opportunities for him and older brother Harry, by now, the only children left at home. Simpson rode his first bike, his brother-in-law's, at age 12, sharing it with Harry and two cousins for time trials around Harworth. Following Harry, Tom joined Harworth & District CC (Cycling Club) aged 13. He delivered groceries in the Bassetlaw district by bicycle and traded with a customer for a better road bike. He was often left behind in club races; members of his cycling club nicknamed him "four-stone Coppi", after Italian rider Fausto Coppi, due to his slim physique.

Simpson began winning club time trials, but sensed resentment of his boasting from senior members. He left Harworth & District and joined Rotherham's Scala Wheelers at the end of 1954. Simpson's first road race was as a junior at the Forest Recreation Ground in Nottingham. After leaving school he was an apprentice draughtsman at an engineering company in Retford, using the 10 mi (16.1 km) commute by bike as training. He placed well in half mile races on grass and cement, but decided to concentrate on road racing. In May 1955 Simpson won the National Cyclists' Union South Yorkshire individual pursuit track event as a junior; the same year, he won the British League of Racing Cyclists (BLRC) junior hill climb championship and placed third in the senior event.

Simpson immersed himself in the world of cycling, writing letters asking for advice. Naturalised Austrian rider George Berger responded, travelling from London to Harworth to help him with his riding position. In late 1955, Simpson ran a red light in a race and was suspended from racing for six months by the BLRC. During his suspension he dabbled in motorcycle trials, nearly quitting cycling but unable to afford a new motorcycle necessary for progress in the sport.

=== Track years ===
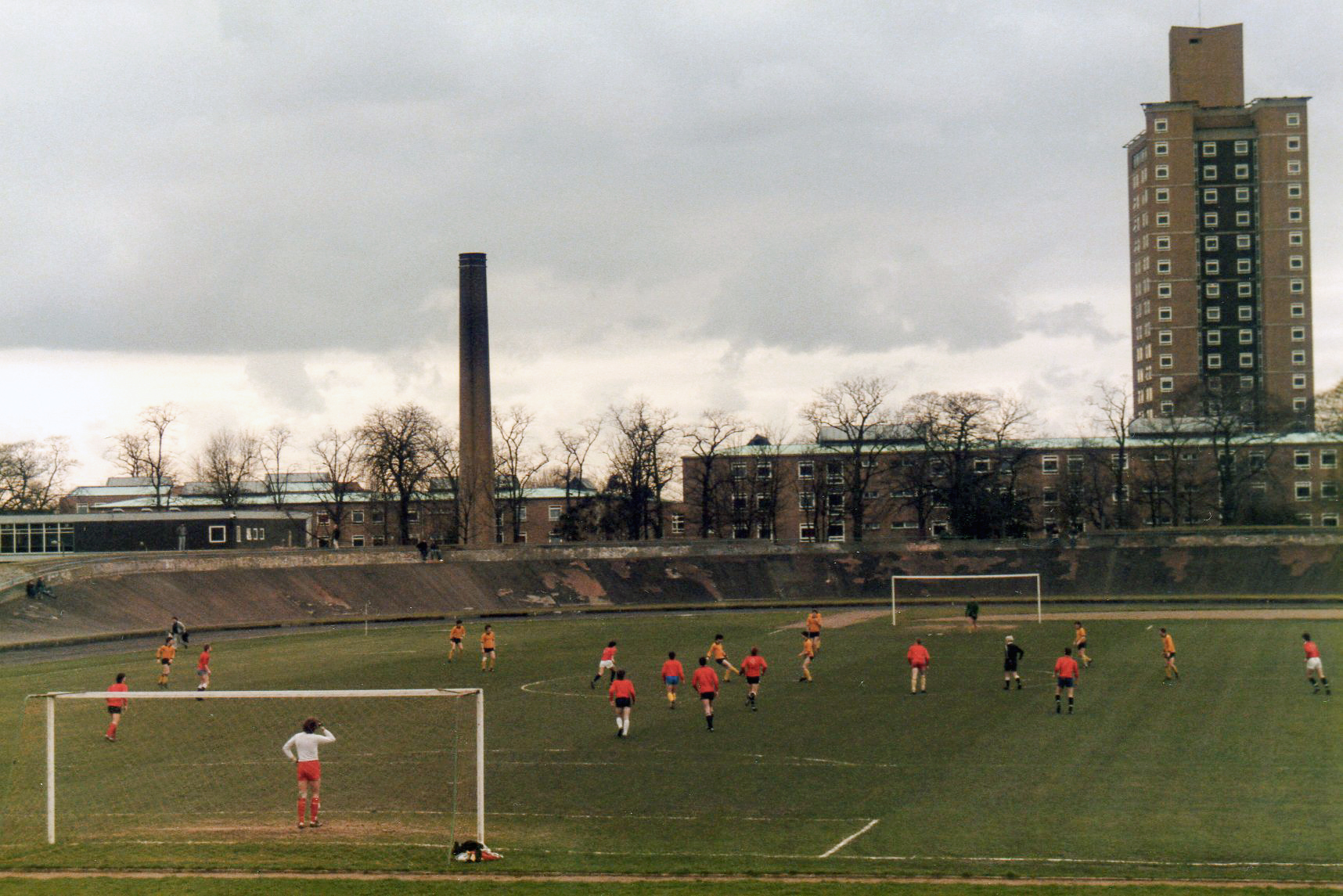
In 1956, aged 18, Simpson began track cycling at Manchester's Fallowfield Stadium (pictured in 1985).

Berger told Simpson that if he wanted to be a successful road cyclist, he needed experience in track cycling, particularly in the pursuit discipline. Simpson competed regularly at Fallowfield Stadium in Manchester, where in early 1956 he met amateur world pursuit silver medallist Cyril Cartwright, who helped him develop his technique. At the national championships at Fallowfield the 18-year-old Simpson won a silver medal in the individual pursuit, defeating amateur world champion Norman Sheil before losing to Mike Gambrill.

Simpson began working with his father as a draughtsman at the glass factory in Harworth. He was riding well; although not selected by Great Britain for the amateur world championships, he made the 4,000-metre team pursuit squad for the 1956 Olympics. In mid-September, Simpson competed for two weeks in Eastern Europe against Russian and Italian teams to prepare for the Olympics. The seven-rider contingent began with races in Leningrad, continuing to Moscow before finishing in Sofia. He was nicknamed "the Sparrow" by the Soviet press because of his slender build. The following month he was in Melbourne for the Olympics, where the team qualified for the team-pursuit semi-finals against Italy; they were confident of defeating South Africa and France but lost to Italy, taking the bronze medal. Simpson blamed himself for the loss for pushing too hard on a turn and being unable to recover for the next.

There was one name on everyone's lips on that day: "Tom Simpson". There was a buzz in the crowd as he began to climb, you could feel it, and I remember this lad with a shock of hair thundering up the hill past me, carried on a solid wave of excitement. The overall feeling that day was that this was the future, this was the man to watch – Tom Simpson.

— Spectator Gordon Hill, remembering the 1957 BLRC national hill climb championships.

After the Olympics, Simpson trained throughout his winter break into 1957. In May, he rode in the national 25-mile championships; although he was the favourite, he lost to Sheil in the final. In a points race at an international event at Fallowfield a week later Simpson crashed badly, almost breaking his leg; he stopped working for a month and struggled to regain his form. At the national pursuit championships, he was beaten in the quarter-finals. After this defeat Simpson returned to road racing, winning the BLRC national hill climb championship in October before taking a short break from racing. In spring 1958 he traveled to Sofia with Sheil for two weeks' racing. On his return he won the national individual pursuit championship at Herne Hill Velodrome. In July, Simpson won a silver medal for England in the individual pursuit at the British Empire and Commonwealth Games in Cardiff, losing to Sheil by one-hundredth of a second in the final. A medical exam taken with the Royal Air Force (RAF) revealed Simpson to be colour blind.

In September 1958, Simpson competed at the amateur world championships in Paris. Against reigning champion Carlo Simonigh of Italy in the opening round of the individual pursuit, he crashed on the concrete track at the end of the race. Simpson was briefly knocked unconscious and sustained a dislocated jaw; however, he won the race since he crashed after the finish line. Although he was in pain, team manager Benny Foster forced Simpson to race in the quarter-final against New Zealand's Warwick Dalton, hoping to unsettle Dalton ahead of a possible meeting with Simpson's teammate Sheil. Simpson wanted to turn professional, but needed to prove himself first, setting his sights on the world amateur indoor hour record. Reg Harris arranged for an attempt at Zürich's Hallenstadion velodrome on Simpson's birthday in November. He failed by 320 metres, covering a distance of 43.995 km (27.337 mi) and blaming his failure on the low temperature generated by an ice rink in the centre of the velodrome. The following week he travelled to Ghent, in the Flanders region of Belgium, to ride amateur track races. He stayed at the Café Den Engel, run by Albert Beurick, who organised for him to ride at Ghent's Kuipke velodrome in the Sportpaleis (English: Sport Palace).

Simpson decided to move to the continent for a better chance at success, and contacted French brothers Robert and Yvon Murphy, whom he met while racing. They agreed that he could stay with them in the Breton fishing port of Saint-Brieuc. His final event in Britain was at Herne Hill, riding motor-paced races. Simpson won the event and was invited to Germany to train for the 1959 motor-paced world championships, but declined the opportunity in favour of a career on the road. Bicycle manufacturer Elswick Hopper invited him to join their British-based team, but Benny Foster advised him to continue with his plans to move to France.

=== Move to Brittany ===
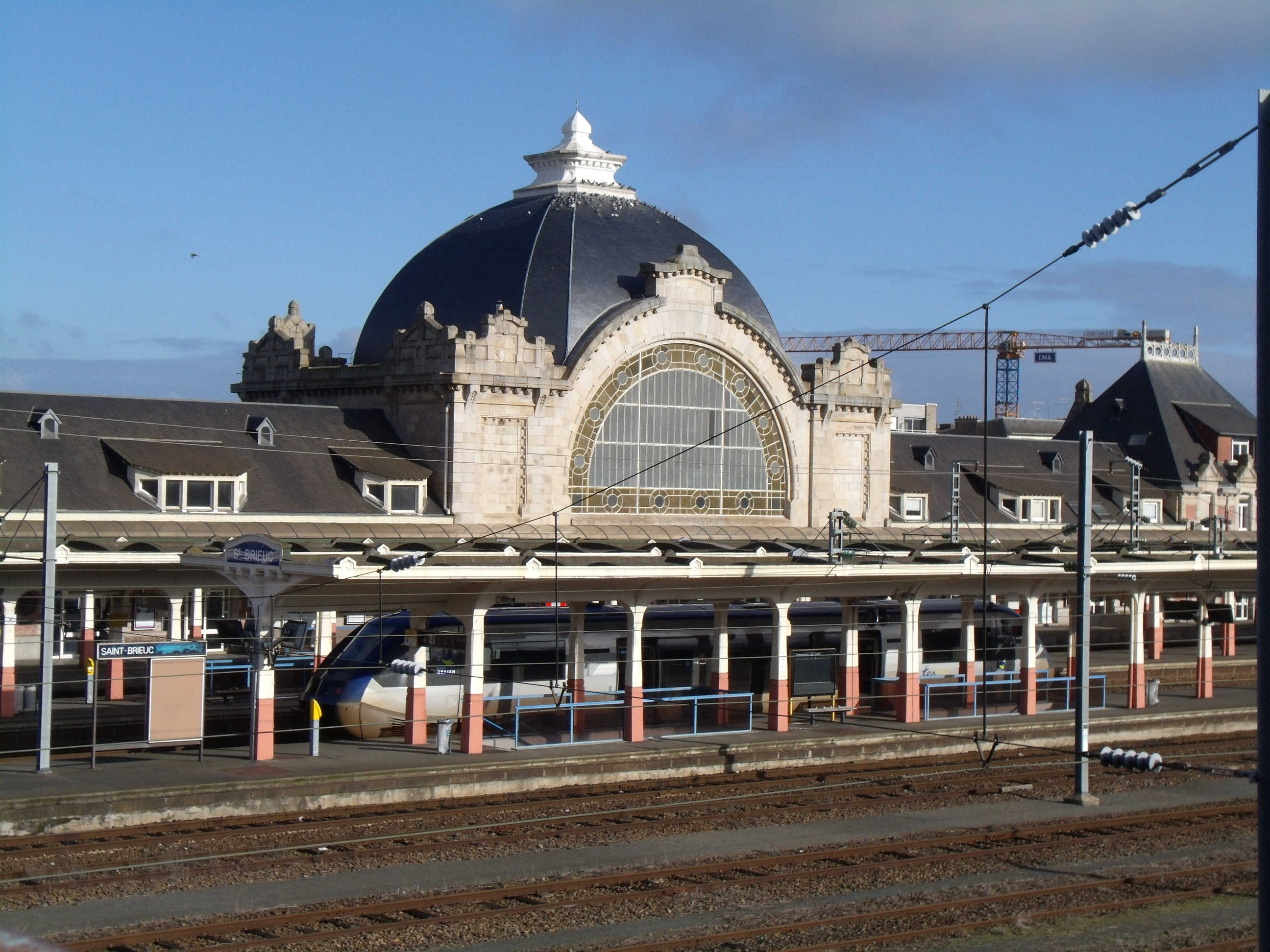
In April 1959, 21-year-old Simpson arrived at Gare de Saint-Brieuc in Brittany (pictured in 2011) with £100 and the hope of launching his continental professional career.

In April 1959, Simpson left for France with £100 savings and two Carlton bikes, one road and one track, given in appreciation of his help promoting the company. His last words to his mother before the move were, "I don't want to be sitting here in twenty years' time, wondering what would have happened if I hadn't gone to France". The next day, his National Service papers were delivered; although willing to serve before his move, he feared the call-up would put his potential career at risk. His mother returned them, with the hope they would understand this.

He applied to local cycling clubs, and joined Club Olympique Briochin, racing with an independent (semi-professional) licence from the British Cycling Federation. When settled with the Murphy family, 21-year-old Simpson met 19-year-old Helen Sherburn, an au pair from Sutton, Yorkshire. Simpson began attracting attention, winning races and criteriums. He was invited to race in the eight-day stage race Route de France by the Saint-Raphaël VC 12e, the amateur club below the professional team Saint-Raphaël–R. Geminiani–Dunlop. Simpson won the final stage, breaking away from the peloton and holding on for victory. After this win, he declined an offer to ride in the Tour de France for the professional team. Simpson had contract offers from two professional teams, Mercier–BP–Hutchinson and Saint-Raphaël–R. Geminiani–Dunlop, which had a British cyclist, Brian Robinson; opting for the latter team, on 29 June he signed a contract for 80,000 francs (£80 a month).

On Simpson's return to Harworth for Christmas, the RAF were notified and the press ran stories on his apparent draft avoidance. He passed a medical in Sheffield, but history repeated itself and the papers arrived the day after his departure for his team's training camp in Narbonne in southern France. The French press, unlike the British, found the situation amusing.

== Professional career ==
=== 1959: Foundations ===
In July, four months after leaving England, Simpson rode his first race as a professional, the Tour de l'Ouest in west France. He won the fourth stage and took the overall race leader's jersey. He won the next stage's individual time trial, increasing his lead. On the next stage he lost the lead with a punctured tyre, finishing the race in fourteenth place overall.

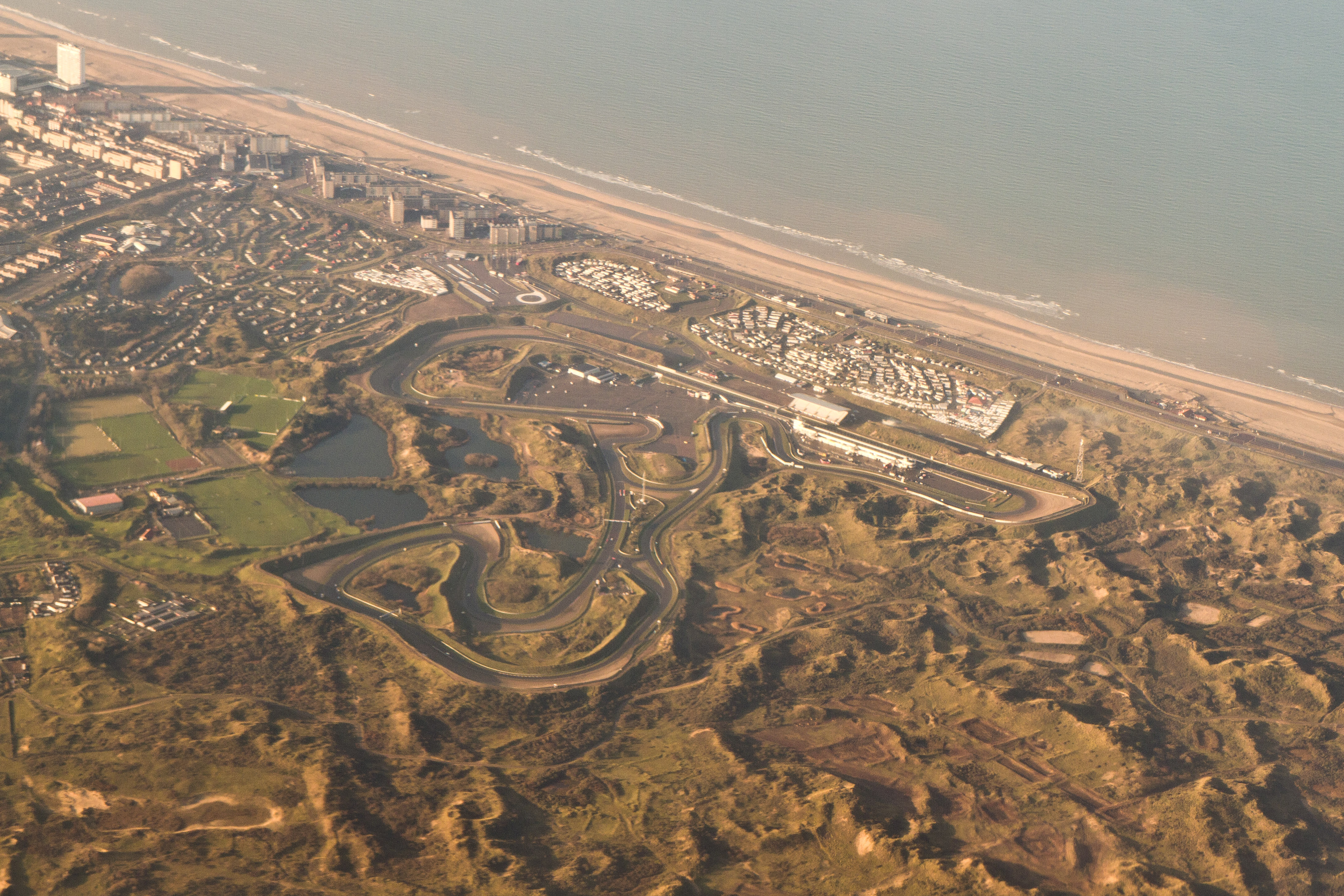
Simpson's fourth place in the 1959 world road race championships at Circuit Park Zandvoort in the Netherlands (pictured in 2011) was the highest ever by a British rider.

In August Simpson competed at the world championships in the 5000 m individual pursuit at Amsterdam's large, open-air velodrome and the road race on the nearby Circuit Park Zandvoort motor-racing track. He placed fourth in the individual pursuit, losing by 0.3 seconds in the quarter-finals. He prepared for the 180 mi (290 km) road race, eight laps of the track. After 45 mi (72 km) a ten-rider breakaway formed; Simpson bridged the gap. As the peloton began to close in, he tried to attack. Although he was brought back each time, Simpson placed fourth in a sprint for the best finish to date by a British rider. He was praised by the winner, André Darrigade of France, who thought that without Simpson's work on the front, the breakaway would have been caught. Darrigade helped him enter criteriums for extra money. His fourth place earned Simpson his nickname, "Major Simpson", from French sports newspaper L'Équipe. They ran the headline: "Les carnets du Major Simpson" ("The notes of Major Simpson"), referencing the 1950s series of books, Les carnets du Major Thompson by Pierre Daninos.

Simpson moved up to Saint-Raphaël–R. Geminiani–Dunlop's first team, Rapha–Gitane–Dunlop, for the end-of-season one-day classic races. In his first appearance in the Giro di Lombardia, one of the five "monuments" of cycling, he retired with a tyre puncture while in the lead group of riders. In Simpson's last race of the season, he finished fourth in the Trofeo Baracchi, a two-man team time trial with Gérard Saint, racing against his boyhood idol, Fausto Coppi; it was Coppi's final race before his death. Simpson finished the season with twenty-eight wins.

=== 1960: Tour de France debut ===
His first major race of the 1960 season was the one-day "monument" Milan–San Remo in March, in which the organisers introduced the Poggio climb (the final climb) to keep the race from finishing with a bunch sprint. Simpson broke clear from a breakaway group over the first climb, the Turchino, leading the race for 45 km (28 mi) before being caught. He lost contact over the Poggio, finishing in 38th place. In April he moved to the Porte de Clichy district of Paris, sharing a small apartment with his teammate Robinson.

Days after his move, Simpson rode in Paris–Roubaix, known as "The Hell of the North", the first cycling race to be shown live on Eurovision. He launched an attack as an early breakaway, riding alone at the front for 40 km (24.9 mi), but was caught around a mile from the finish at Roubaix Velodrome, coming in ninth. Simpson rode a lap of honour after the race at the request of the emotional crowd. His televised effort gained him attention throughout Europe. He then won the Mont Faron hill climb and the overall general classification of the Tour du Sud-Est, his first overall win in a professional stage race. He planned to ride in the Isle of Man International road race, excited to see to his home fans. There were rumours, which proved correct, that the Royal Military Police were waiting for him at the airport, so he decided not to travel. This was the last he heard from the authorities regarding his call-up. The British Cycling Federation fined him £25 for his absence.

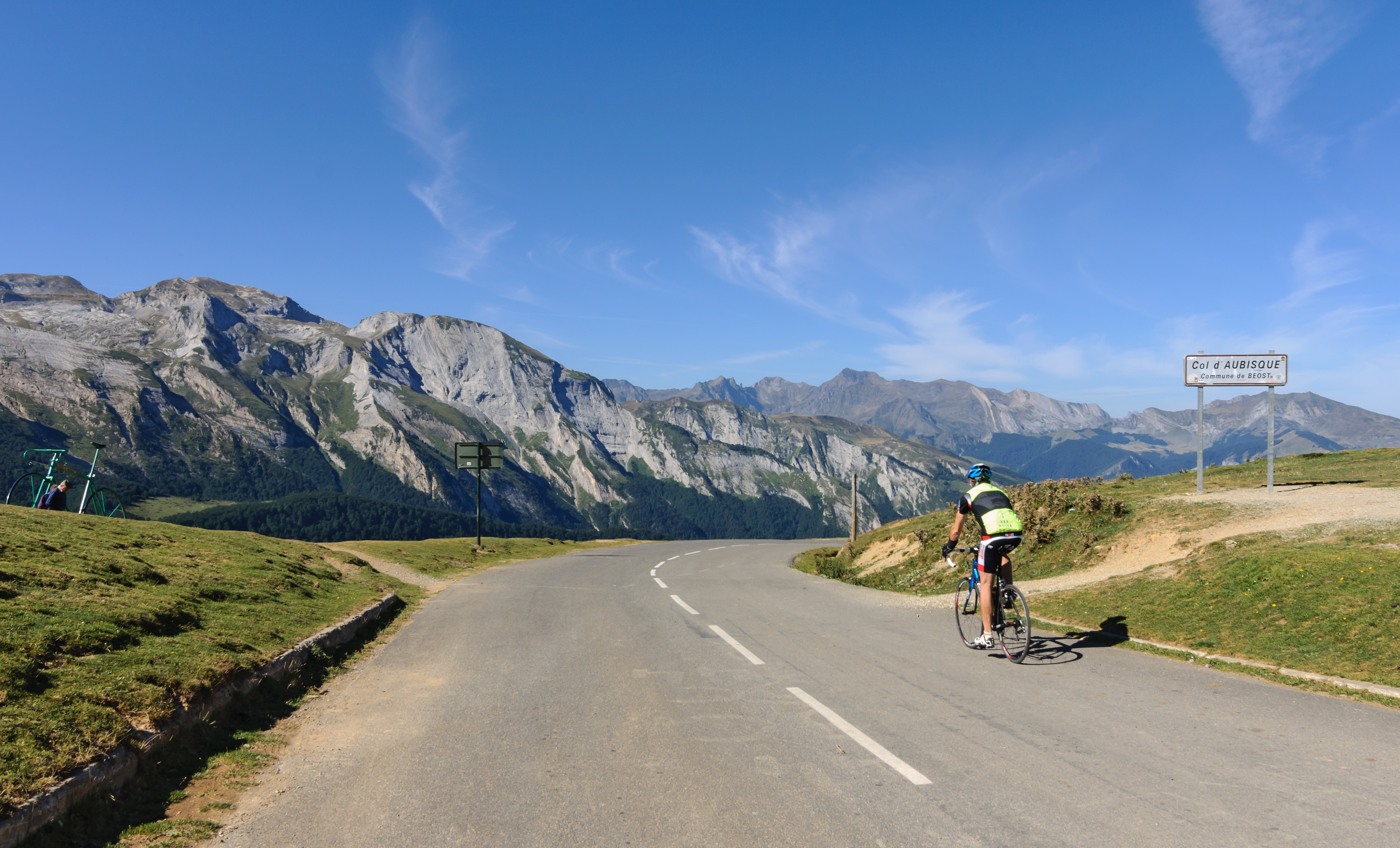
Simpson crashed descending the Col d'Aubisque (pictured) during the tenth stage of the 1960 Tour de France, finishing the tour in 29th place overall.

In June, Simpson made his Grand Tour debut in the Tour de France aged 22. Rapha directeur sportif (team manager) Raymond Louviot opposed his participation, but since the race was contested by national teams Simpson accepted the invitation from the British squad. During the first stage, he was part of a thirteen-rider breakaway which finished over two minutes in front of the field; he crashed on the cinder track at Heysel Stadium in Brussels, finishing thirteenth, but received the same time as the winner. Later that day he finished ninth in the time trial, moving up to fifth place overall. During the third stage Simpson was part of a breakaway with two French riders who repeatedly attacked him, forcing him to chase and use energy needed for the finish; he finished third, missing the thirty-second bonus for a first-place finish, which would have put him in the overall race leader's yellow jersey. He dropped to ninth overall by the end of the first week. During stage ten, Simpson crashed descending the Col d'Aubisque in the Pyrenees but finished the stage in fourteenth place. In the following stage he was dropped, exhausted, from a chasing group; failing to recover. He finished the Tour in twenty-ninth place overall, losing 2 st (13 kg; 28 lb) in weight over the three weeks.

After the Tour, Simpson rode criteriums around Europe until crashing in central France; he returned home to Paris and checked himself into a hospital. Following a week's bed-rest, he rode in the road world championships at the Sachsenring in East Germany. During the race Simpson stopped to adjust his shoes on the right side of the road and was hit from behind by a car, sustaining a cut to his head which required five stitches. In the last of the classics, the Giro di Lombardia, he struggled, finishing eighty-fourth. Simpson had been in constant contact with Helen, who was now working in Stuttgart, Germany, meeting with her between races. They became engaged on Christmas Day, and originally planned to marry at the end of 1961, but in fact wed on 3 January 1961 in Doncaster, Yorkshire.

=== 1961: Tour of Flanders and injury ===
Simpson's first major event of the 1961 season was the Paris–Nice stage race in March. In stage three he helped his team win the team time trial and took the general classification lead by three seconds; however, he lost it in the next stage. In the final stages of the race Simpson's attacks were thwarted, and he finished fifth overall.

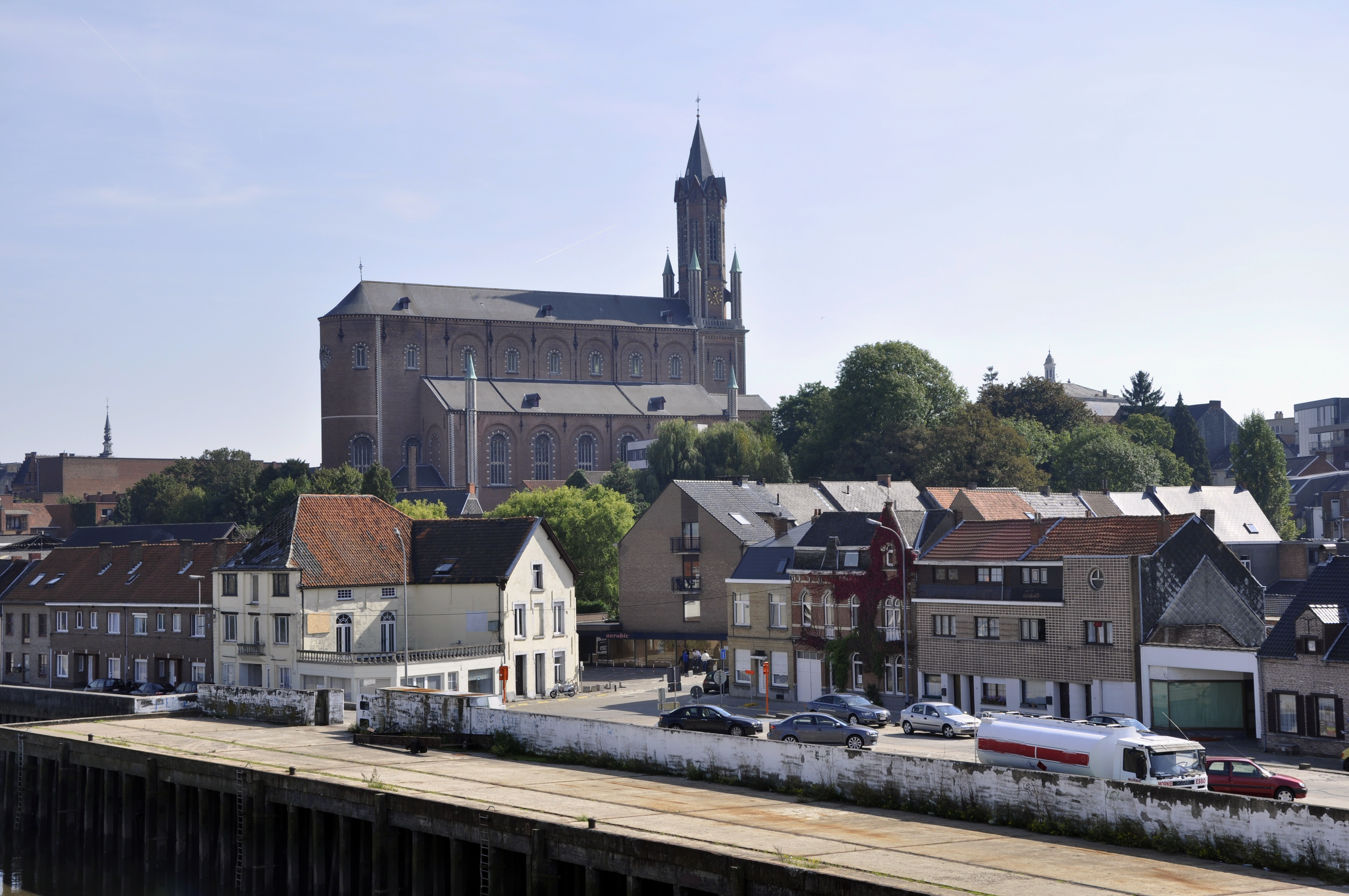
Simpson won the 1961 Tour of Flanders in a two-man sprint with Nino Defilippis in Wetteren, Belgium, becoming the first Briton to win a "monument" classic.

On 26 March, Simpson rode in the one-day Tour of Flanders. With Carpano's Nino Defilippis, he chased down an early breakaway. Simpson worked with the group; with about 8 km (5 mi) to go he attacked, followed by Defilippis. The finish, three circuits around the town of Wetteren, was flat; Defilippis, unlike Simpson, was a sprinter and was expected to win. One kilometre from the finish, Simpson launched a sprint; he eased off with 300 m to go, tricking Defilippis into thinking he was exhausted. As Defilippis passed, Simpson jumped again to take victory, becoming the first Briton to win a "monument" classic. Defilippis protested that the finishing banner had been blown down, and he did not know where the finish was; however, the judges noted that the finish line was clearly marked on the road itself. Defilippis' team asked Simpson to agree to a tie, saying no Italian had won a classic since 1953. He replied: "An Englishman had not won one since 1896!"

A week later, Simpson rode in Paris–Roubaix in the hope of bettering his previous year's ninth place. As the race reached the paved section he went on a solo attack, at which point he was told that Mercier–BP–Hutchinson rider Raymond Poulidor was chasing him down. Simpson increased his speed, catching the publicity and press vehicles ahead (known as the caravane). A press car swerved to avoid a pothole; this forced him into a roadside ditch. Simpson fell, damaging his front wheel and injuring his knee. He found his team car and collected a replacement wheel, but by then the front of the race had passed. Back in the race he crashed twice more, finishing 88th.

At Simpson's next race, the four-day Grand Prix d'Eibar, his first in Spain, his knee injury still bothered him. He won the second stage, but was forced to quit during the following stage. His injury had not healed, even after treatment by various specialists, but for financial reasons he was forced to enter the Tour de France with the British team. He abandoned on stage three, which started in Roubaix, struggling to pedal on the cobbles. Three months after his fall at Paris–Roubaix he saw a doctor at St. Michael's Hospital in Paris. He gave Simpson injections in his knee, which reduced the inflammation. Once healed, he competed in the road world championships in Berne, Switzerland. On the track he qualified for the individual pursuit with the fourth-fastest time, losing in the quarter-finals to Peter Post of the Netherlands. In the road race, Simpson was part of a seventeen-rider breakaway that finished together in a sprint; he crossed the line in ninth place.

Helen became pregnant; Simpson's apartment in Paris was now unsuitable and a larger home in France was not in their means. In October, with help from his friend, Albert Beurick, they moved into a small cottage in Ghent. Low on funds, Simpson earned money in one-day track races in Belgium.

=== 1962: Yellow jersey ===
Simpson's contract with Rapha-Gitane-Dunlop had ended with the 1961 season. Tour de France winner Jacques Anquetil signed with them for 1962, but Simpson wanted to lead a team, and signed with Gitane–Leroux–Dunlop–R. Geminiani for the 1962 season. After training camp at Lodève in southern France, he rode in Paris–Nice. He helped his team win the stage-3a team time trial and finished second overall, behind Flandria–Faema–Clément's Jef Planckaert. He was unable to ride in Milan–San Remo when its organisers limited the race to Italian-based teams; (Note: The organisers of the 1962 Milan–San Remo only allowed Italian teams to participate as an attempt to get an Italian winner, as the last one was in 1953.) instead he rode in Gent–Wevelgem, finishing sixth, then defended his Tour of Flanders title. At the end of the latter, Simpson was in a select group of riders at the head of the race. Although he led over each of the final climbs, at the finish he finished fifth and won the King of the Mountains prize. A week later Simpson finished thirty-seventh in Paris–Roubaix, delayed by a crash.

At the 1962 Tour de France Simpson claimed the yellow jersey at the end of stage 12 as general classification leader, losing it the next day.

Coming into the Tour de France, Simpson was leader of his team; it was the first time since 1929 that company teams were allowed to compete. He finished ninth in the first stage, in a group of twenty-two riders who finished over eight minutes ahead of the rest. Simpson's team finished second to Flandria–Faema–Clément in the stage-2b team time trial; he was in seventh place in the general classification, remaining in the top ten the rest of the first week. During stage 8a he was in a thirty-rider group which gained about six minutes, moving him to second overall behind teammate André Darrigade. At the end of the eleventh stage Simpson was third in the overall, over a minute behind race leader Willy Schroeders (Flandria–Faema–Clément) and fifty-one seconds behind Darrigade. Stage twelve from Pau to Saint-Gaudens, the hardest stage of the 1962 Tour (known as the "Circle of Death"), was the Tour's first mountain stage. Simpson saw an opportunity to lead the race. The team now solely concentrated on his interests, since Darrigade was a sprinter and would no longer be involved in the general classification. As the peloton reached the Col du Tourmalet, Simpson attacked with a small group of select riders, finishing eighteenth place in a bunch sprint. As he finished ahead of all the other leaders in the general classification, he became the overall new leader of race, and the first British rider to wear the leader's yellow jersey. Simpson lost the lead on the following stage, a short time trial ending with a steep uphill finish at Superbagnères. He finished thirty-first and dropped to sixth overall. On stage nineteen he advanced recklessly descending the Col de Porte in the Alps, crashing on a bend and only saved from falling over the edge by a tree, leaving him with a broken left middle finger. He lost almost eleven minutes in the next stage's time trial, finishing the Tour at Paris' Parc des Princes stadium 17 minutes and 9 seconds behind in 6th place.

After the Tour Simpson rode criteriums before the road world championships in Salò, Italy, where he retired after missing a large breakaway. He began riding six-day track races into his winter break. In December he made an appearance at the Champions' Concert cycling awards held at Royal Albert Hall in London. Separately, he won the British Cycling Federation's Personality of the Year. Simpson and Helen were expecting their second child and upgraded to a larger house in Sint-Amandsberg, a sub-municipality of Ghent.

=== 1963: Bordeaux–Paris ===
Leroux withdrew its sponsorship of the Gitane team for the 1963 season. Simpson was contracted to their manager, Raymond Louviot; Louviot was rejoining Saint-Raphaël–Gitane–R. Geminiani and Simpson could follow, but he saw that as a step backwards. Peugeot–BP–Englebert bought the contract from Louviot, which ran until the end of the season. Simpson's season opened with Paris–Nice; he fell out of contention after a series of tyre punctures in the opening stages, using the rest of the race as training. He withdrew from the race on the final stage to rest for his next race, Milan–San Remo; after breaking away by himself he stopped beside the road, which annoyed his fellow riders. At Milan–San Remo, Simpson was in a four-rider breakaway; his tyre punctured, and although he got back to the front, he finished nineteenth. He placed third in the Tour of Flanders in a three-rider sprint. In Paris–Roubaix Simpson worked for teammate, and winner, Emile Daems, finishing ninth. In the one-day Paris–Brussels he was in a breakaway near the Belgian border; with 50 km (31.1 mi) remaining he was left with world road race champion Jean Stablinski of Saint-Raphaël–Gitane–R. Geminiani, who attacked on a cobbled climb in Alsemberg outside Brussels. Simpson's bike slipped a gear, and Stablinski stayed away for the victory. After his second-place finish, Simpson led the Super Prestige Pernod International season-long competition for world's best cyclist. The following week he raced in the Ardennes classics, placing thirty-third in Liège–Bastogne–Liège, after he rode alone for about 100 km (62 mi) before being caught in the closing kilometres.

In 1963, Simpson won the 557 km (346 mi) derny-paced Bordeaux–Paris race, one of the longest one-day races.

On 26 May, Simpson rode in the one-day, 557 km (346 mi) Bordeaux–Paris. Also known as the "Derby of the Road", it was the longest he had ever ridden. The race began at 1:58 am; the initial 161 km (100 mi) were unpaced until the town of Châtellerault, where dernys (motorised bicycles) paced each rider to the finish. Simpson broke away in a group of three riders. Simpson's pacer, Fernand Wambst, increased his speed, and Simpson dropped the other two. He caught the lead group, thirteen minutes ahead, over a distance of 161 km (100 mi). Simpson attacked, and with 36 km (22.4 mi) remaining, opening a margin of two minutes. His lead steadily increased, and he finished in the Parc des Princes over five minutes ahead of teammate Piet Rentmeester.

Simpson announced that he would not ride the Tour de France, concentrating on the world road championships instead. Before, he won the Isle of Man International in treacherous conditions where only sixteen out of seventy riders finished. At the road world championships in Ronse, Belgium, the Belgians controlled the race until Simpson broke free, catching two riders ahead: Henry Anglade (France) and Shay Elliott (Ireland). Anglade was dropped, and Elliott refused to work with Simpson. (Note: Shay Elliott rode for Saint-Raphaël–Gitane–R. Geminiani, the rival team of Simpson's Peugeot team, and would not work with Simpson and risk him winning. Two years later Simpson revealed in The People that he offered Elliott £1,100 for him to work with him.) They were caught; the race finished in a bunch sprint, with Simpson crossing the line in 29th. Simpson's season ended with six-day races across Europe and an invitation only race on the Pacific island of New Caledonia, along with other European riders. He skipped his usual winter training schedule for his first skiing holiday at Saint-Gervais-les-Bains in the Alps, taking Helen and his two young daughters, Jane and Joanne.

=== 1964: Milan–San Remo ===
After a training camp near Nice in southern France Simpson rode in the one-day Kuurne–Brussels–Kuurne in Belgium, finishing second to Solo–Superia's Arthur Decabooter. The conditions were so cold, he only completed the race to keep warm. Albert Beurick started Simpson's supporters club at the Café Den Engel, raising £250 for him in the first nine months. In Paris–Nice, his tyre punctured during stage four, losing five minutes and used the rest of the race for training.

Profile of the 1964 Milan–San Remo, which Simpson won, riding his second season with Peugeot–BP–Englebert

On 19 March, two days later, Simpson rode in Milan–San Remo. Before the race, French journalist René de Latour advised Simpson not to attack early: "If you feel good then keep it for the last hour of the race." In the final 32 km (19.9 mi), Simpson escaped in a group of four riders, which included the 1961 winner, Poulidor of Mercier–BP–Hutchinson. On final climb, the Poggio, Poulidor launched a series of attacks on the group; only Simpson managed to stay with him and they crossed the summit and descended into San Remo. With 500 m to go, Simpson began his sprint; Poulidor could not respond, leaving Simpson to take the victory with a record average speed of 27.1 mph (43.6 km/h).

Simpson spent the next two months training for the Tour de France at the end of June. After the first week of the Tour, Simpson was in tenth place overall. On the ninth stage, he was part of 22-rider breakaway which finished together at Monaco's Stade Louis II; he placed second to Anquetil, moving up to eighth overall. The next day, he finished 20th in the 20.8 km (12.9 mi) time trial. During the 16th stage, which crossed four cols, Simpson finished 33rd, 25 minutes and 10 seconds behind the stage winner, and dropped to 17th overall. He finished the Tour in 14th place overall. Simpson later discovered that he rode the Tour suffering from tapeworms.

After the race, Simpson prepared for the world road championships with distance training and criteriums. At the world championships on 3 September, the 290 km (180 mi) road race consisted of twenty-four laps of a varying circuit at Sallanches in the French Alps. Simpson crashed on the third lap while descending in wet conditions, damaging a pedal. He got back to the peloton, launching a solo attack on a descent; he then chased down the group of four leaders with two laps to go. On the last lap he was dropped by three riders, finishing six seconds behind. On 17 October, Simpson rode in the Giro di Lombardia. Halfway through the race he was given the wrong musette (bag) by his team in the feed zone, and threw it away. With the head of the race reduced to five riders, Molteni's Gianni Motta attacked. Simpson was the only one who could follow, but he began to feel the effects of not eating. Motta gave him part of his food, which sustained him for a while. On the final climb Simpson led Motta, but was exhausted. Over the remaining 10 km (6.2 mi) of flat terrain, Motta dropped him; Simpson cracked, and was repeatedly overtaken, finishing twenty-first. He closed the year riding track races.

=== 1965: World championship and Lombardia ===
The Simpson family spent Christmas in England, before a trip to Saint-Gervais-les-Bains, where Simpson injured himself skiing, suffering a broken foot and a sprained ankle. He recovered, riding six-day races. At the Antwerp six-day, he dropped out on the fourth day with a cold. His cold worsened and he missed most of March. He abandoned Milan–San Remo at the foot of the Poggio. On 11 April, he finished seventh in Paris–Roubaix after crashing in the lead group. The crash forced him to miss the Tour of Flanders as he struggled to walk on his injured foot. In Liège–Bastogne–Liège he attacked with Salvarani's Felice Gimondi, catching an early break. They worked together for 25 km (15.5 mi), until Gimondi gave up. Simpson rode alone before slipping on oil mixed with water; he stayed with the front group, finishing tenth.

On 29 May, Simpson rode in the London–Holyhead race, the longest unpaced one-day race, with a distance of 265 mi (426 km); he won in a bunch sprint, setting a record of ten hours and twenty-nine minutes. He followed with an appearance at Bordeaux–Paris. François Mahé (Pelforth–Sauvage–Lejeune) went on a lone break, Simpson attacked in pursuit, followed by Jean Stablinski. Simpson's derny broke down, and he was delayed changing motorbikes. He caught Stablinski, and was joined by Anquetil. Outside Paris Mahé was caught and dropped, after 200 km (124 mi) on his own. Anquetil won the race by fifty-seven seconds ahead of Stablinski, who beat Simpson in a sprint. Peugeot manager Gaston Plaud ordered Simpson to ride the Midi Libre stage race to earn a place in the Tour de France, and he finished third overall. The 1965 Tour was considered open due to Anquetil's absence, and Simpson was among the riders favoured by L'Équipe. During stage nine he injured his hand crashing on the descent of the Col d'Aubisque in the Pyrenees, finishing tenth in the stage and seventh in general classification. Simpson developed bronchitis after stage fifteen and cracked on the next stage, losing nearly nineteen minutes. His hand became infected, but he rode the next three stages before the Tour doctor stopped him from racing. He was taken to hospital, where they operated on his hand and treated him for blood poisoning, bronchitis and a kidney infection.

Simpson won the 1965 world road race championship, claiming the rainbow jersey and wearing it during the following season.

After ten days off his bike, Simpson was only contracted to three post-Tour criteriums. His training for the road world championships included kermesse circuit races in Flanders. Simpson's last race before the world championships was the Paris–Luxembourg stage race, riding as a super-domestique (lieutenant). On 5 September, Simpson rode in the road race at the world championships in San Sebastián, Spain. The race was a 267.4 km (166 mi) hilly circuit of fourteen laps. The British team had no support; Simpson and his friend Albert Beurick obtained food and drink by stealing from other teams. During the first lap, a strong break was begun by British rider Barry Hoban. As his lead stretched to one minute, Simpson and teammates Vin Denson and Alan Ramsbottom bridged the gap, followed by Germany's Rudi Altig. Hoban kept the pace high enough to prevent any of the favourites from joining. Simpson and Altig broke clear with two-and-a-half laps remaining, staying together until the final kilometre, when Simpson launched his sprint; he held off Altig for victory by three bike lengths, becoming the first British professional world road race champion.

On 16 October, Simpson rode in the Giro di Lombardia, which featured five mountain passes. He escaped with Motta, and dropped him before the finish in Como to win his third "monument" classic over three minutes ahead of the rest. Simpson was the second world champion to win in Italy; the first was Alfredo Binda in 1927. Simpson was offered lucrative contracts by teams, including Flandria–Faema–Clément who were prepared to pay him the year's salary in advance. He could not escape his contract with Peugeot, which ran until the end of the 1967 season. For the next three weeks he rode contract races, riding an estimated 12,000 mi (19,000 km). He rode 18 races, with each earning him £300–£350.

Simpson ended the year second to Anquetil in the Super Prestige Pernod International, and won the Daily Express Sportsman of the Year, the Sports Journalists' Association Sportsman of the Year, presented by the Prime Minister Harold Wilson, and the BBC Sports Personality of the Year. In British cycling Simpson won the British Cycling Federation Personality of the Year and the Bidlake Memorial Prize. He was given the freedom of Sint-Amandsberg; his family, including his parents, were driven in an open-top car along the crowd-lined route from the Café Den Engel to the Town Hall.

=== 1966: An injury-ridden season ===
As in the previous winter, Simpson went on a skiing holiday. On 25 January he fell, breaking his right tibia, and his leg was in a plaster cast until the end of February. He missed contract races, crucial training and most of the spring classics. Simpson began riding again in March, and in late April started, but did not finish, Liège–Bastogne–Liège.

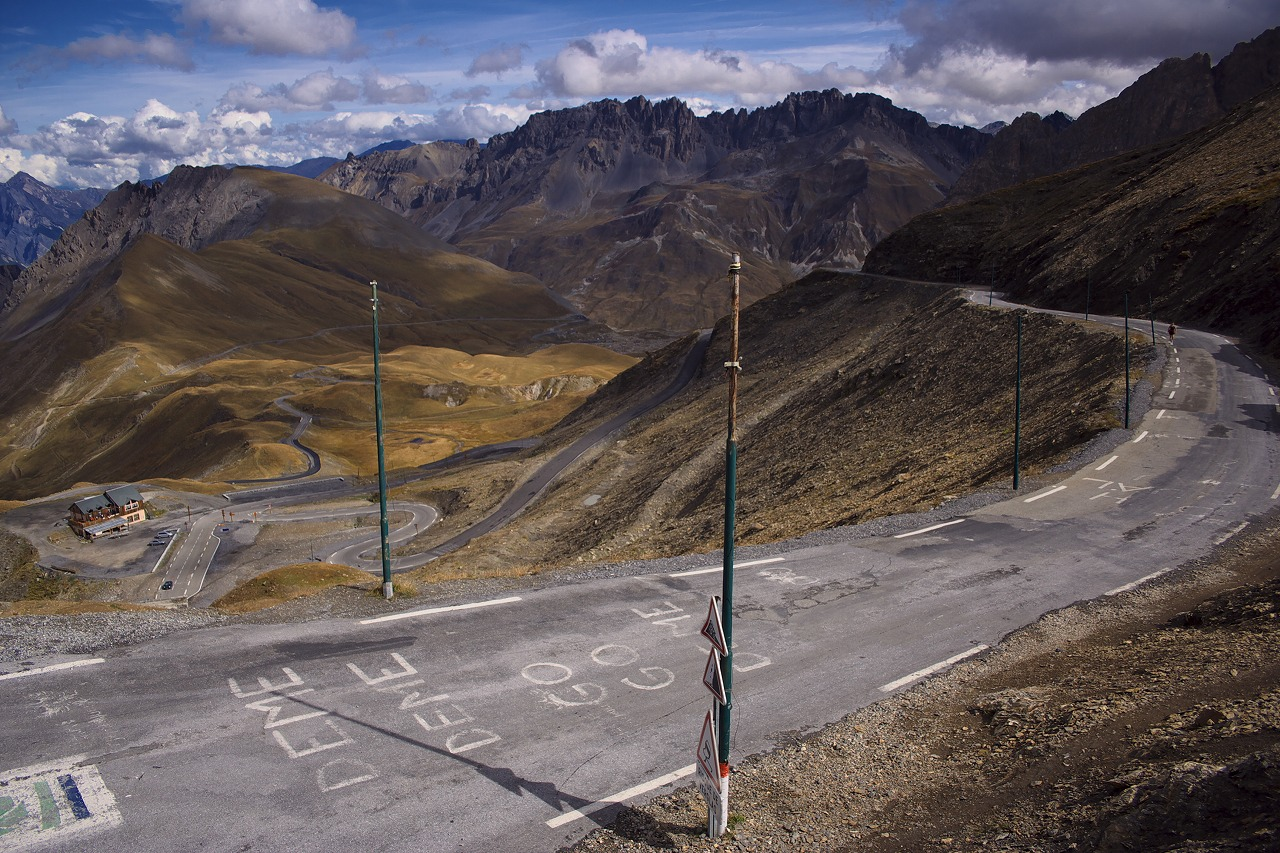
Simpson crashed descending the Col du Galibier (pictured) during stage sixteen of the 1966 Tour de France, injuring his arm and forcing him to abandon the Tour the next day.

Simpson's injury did not stop the press from naming him a favourite for the Tour de France. He was subdued in the race until stage twelve, when he forced a breakaway with Altig (Molteni), finishing second. Simpson again finished second in the next stage, jumping clear of the peloton in a three-rider group in the final kilometres. After the stage he was eighteenth overall, over seven minutes down. Simpson moved up to 16th after finishing 5th in stage 14b – a short time trial. As the race reached the Alps, he decided to make his move. During stage sixteen he attacked on the descent of the first of three cols, the Croix de Fer. He crashed but continued, attacking again. Simpson was joined by Ford France–Hutchinson's Julio Jiménez on the climb of the Télégraphe to the Galibier. Simpson was caught by a chase group descending the Galibier before he crashed again, knocked off his bike by a press motorcycle. The crash required five stitches in his arm. The next day he struggled to hold the handlebars and could not use the brake lever with his injured arm, forcing him to abandon. His answer to journalists asking about his future was, "I don't know. I'm heartbroken. My season is ruined."

After recovering from his injury Simpson rode 40 criteriums in 40 days, capitalising on his world championship and his attacks in the Tour. He retired from the road world championships at the Nürburgring with cramp. His road season ended with retirements from autumn classics Paris–Tours and the Giro di Lombardia. He rode six-day races, finishing fourteenth in the winter rankings. The misfortune he endured during the season made him the first rider named as a victim of the "curse of the rainbow jersey". For the winter Simpson took his family to the island of Corsica, planning the build of his retirement home.

=== 1967: Paris–Nice and Vuelta stages ===
Simpson's primary objective for 1967 was overall victory in the Tour de France; in preparation, he planned to ride stage races instead of one-day classics. Simpson felt his chances were good because this Tour was contested by national, rather than professional teams. (Note: The national team format was used in the 1967 Tour de France after tour organiser, Félix Lévitan, believed the team sponsors were behind the riders' strike in the previous year's Tour.) He would lead the British team, which – although one of the weakest – would support him totally, unlike Peugeot. During Simpson's previous three years with Peugeot, he was only guaranteed a place on their Tour team if he signed with them for the following year. Free to join a new team for the 1968 season, he was offered at least ten contracts; Simpson had a verbal agreement with Italian team Salvarani, and would share its leadership with Felice Gimondi. In an interview with Cycling (now Cycling Weekly) journalist, Ken Evans, in April, Simpson revealed his intention to attempt the hour record in the 1967 season. He also said he wanted retire from road racing aged 33, to ride on the track and spend more time with his family.

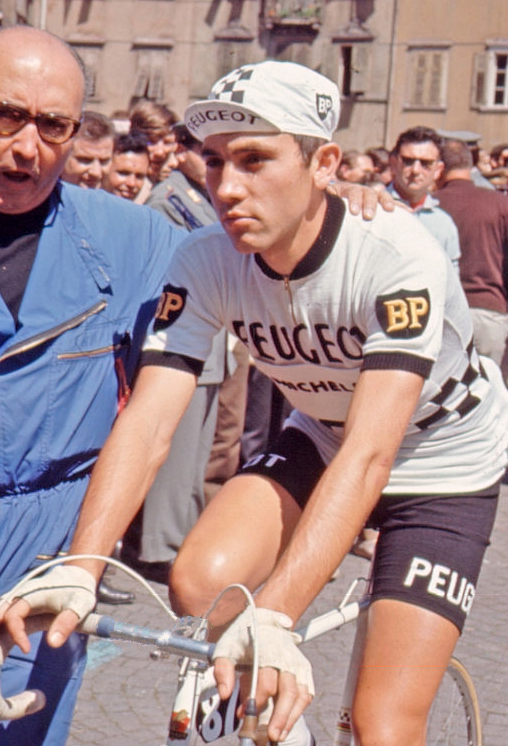
Simpson contested leadership of Peugeot–BP–Michelin with 21-year-old Eddy Merckx (pictured) at the 1967 Paris–Nice, which Simpson won.

In March he rode in the Paris–Nice. After stage two his teammate, Eddy Merckx, took the overall lead. Simpson moved into the lead the next day as part of a breakaway, missed by Merckx, which finished nearly twenty minutes ahead. Merckx thought Simpson double-crossed him, but Simpson was a passive member of the break. At the start of stage six, Simpson was in second place behind Bic–Hutchinson's Rolf Wolfshohl. Merckx drew clear as the race approached Mont Faron, with Simpson following. They stayed together until the finish in Hyères, with Simpson allowing Merckx to take first place. Simpson finished over a minute ahead of Wolfshohl, putting him in the race leader's white jersey. He held the lead in the next two stages to win the race. Three days later Simpson and Merckx both raced in Milan–San Remo. Simpson escaped early in a five-rider breakaway lasting about 220 km (137 mi), before Merckx won in a bunch sprint with assistance from Simpson, who finished in seventieth place. After 110 mi (177 km) of Paris–Roubaix, Simpson's bike was unridable and he retired from the race.

In late April Simpson rode in his first Vuelta a España, using the eighteen-stage race to prepare for the Tour. During stage two a breakaway group gained over thirteen minutes, dashing his hopes for a high placing. Simpson nearly quit the race before the fifth stage, from Salamanca to Madrid, but rode it because it was easier to get home by air from Madrid. He won the stage, attacking from a breakaway, and finished second in stage seven. On the eleventh stage, concluding in Andorra, Simpson rode away from the peloton on his own. With 30 km (18.6 mi) remaining, he began to lose control of his bike and was halted by Peugeot manager Gaston Plaud until he had recovered, by which time the race had passed. In an interview with L'Équipe's Philippe Brunel in February 2000, Tour de France physician Pierre Dumas revealed that Simpson told him that he was taken to hospital during the Vuelta. Simpson won stage sixteen, which ended in San Sebastián, and finished the Vuelta thirty-third overall.

Simpson was determined to make an impact in the Tour de France; in his eighth year as a professional cyclist, he hoped for larger appearance fees in post-Tour criteriums to help secure his financial future after retirement. His plan was to finish in the top three, or to wear the yellow jersey at some point in the race. He targeted three key stages, one of which was the thirteenth, over Mont Ventoux, and planned to ride conservatively until the race reached the mountains. In the prologue, Simpson finished thirteenth. After the first week he was in sixth place overall, leading the favourites. As the race crossed the Alps, Simpson fell ill, across the Col du Galibier, with diarrhoea and stomach pains. Unable to eat, he finished stage ten in 16th place and dropped to seventh overall as his rivals passed him. Teammate Vin Denson advised Simpson to limit his losses and accept what he had. He placed in 39th position on stage 11 and 7th on stage 12. In Marseille, on the evening before stage thirteen, Simpson's manager, Daniel Dousset, pressured him for good results. Plaud begged Simpson to quit the race.

== Death ==
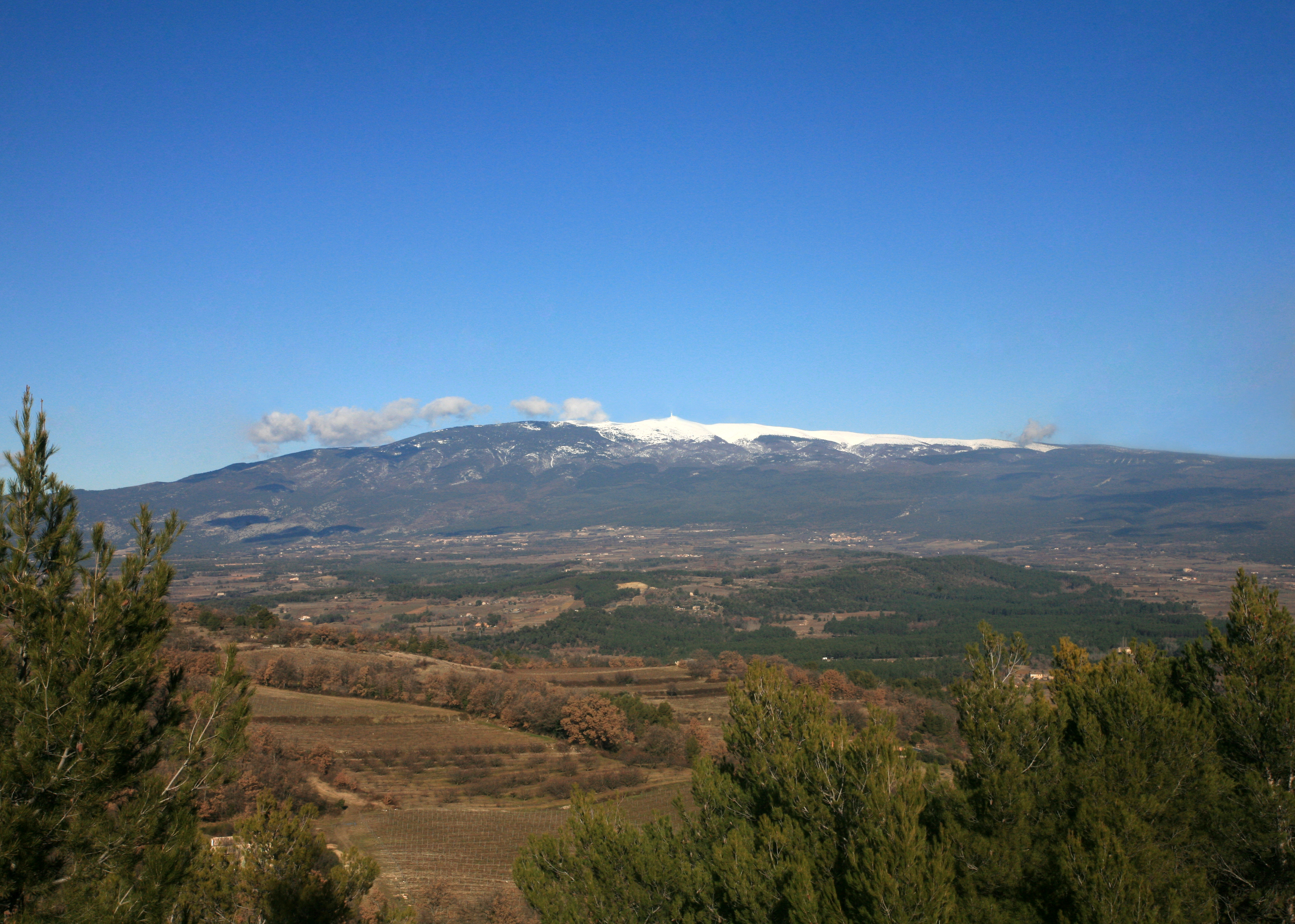
Simpson collapsed one kilometre from the summit of the 1,912 m (6,273 ft)-high Mont Ventoux.

The thirteenth stage (13 July) of the 1967 Tour de France measured 211.5 km (131.4 mi); it started in Marseille, crossing Mont Ventoux (the "Giant of Provence") before finishing in Carpentras. At dawn, Tour doctor Pierre Dumas met journalist Pierre Chany near his hotel. Dumas noted the warm temperature, "If the boys stick their nose in a 'topette' [bag of drugs] today, we could have a death on our hands." At the start line, a journalist noticed Simpson looked tired and asked him if the heat was the problem. Simpson replied, "No, it's not the heat, it's the Tour."

As the race reached the lower slopes of Ventoux, Simpson's team mechanic Harry Hall, witnessed Simpson, still ill, putting the lid back on his water bottle as he exited a building. Race commissaire (official) Jacques Lohmuller later confirmed to Hall that he also saw the incident and that Simpson was putting brandy in his bottle. (Note: Alcohol was used as a stimulant and to dull pain. At the time, the Tour de France organisers limited each rider to four bidons (bottles) of water, about two litres, two on the bike and two more given at feeding stations – the effects of dehydration being poorly understood. During races, riders raided roadside bars for drinks, and filled their bottles from fountains.) Near the summit of Ventoux, the peloton began to fracture. Simpson was in the front group before slipping back to a group of chasers about a minute behind. He then began losing control of his bike, zig-zagging across the road. (Note: Zig-zagging on an ascent is a way of lessening the gradient.) A kilometre from the summit, Simpson fell off his bike. Team manager Alec Taylor and Hall arrived in the team car to help him. Hall tried to persuade Simpson to stop, saying: "Come on Tom, that's it, that's your Tour finished", but Simpson said he wanted to continue. Taylor said, "If Tom wants to go on, he goes". Noticing his toe straps were still undone, Simpson said, "Me straps, Harry, me straps!" They got him on his bike and pushed him off. Simpson's last words, as remembered by Hall, were "On, on, on." (Note: "Put me back on my bike!" was invented by Sid Saltmarsh, who was covering the Tour for The Sun and Cycling (now Cycling Weekly). Saltmarsh was not there at the time, and was in a dead reception zone for live accounts on Radio Tour.) Hall estimated Simpson rode a further 500 yd (457 m) before he began to wobble, (Note: A Daily Mail reporter, J. L. Manning, went to the location of Simpson's death later and found two piles of stones 420 yd (384 m) apart, both with notes attached; the first read: "Tom Simpson fell", and the second: "Here Tom Simpson died tragically on the 13th stage of the Tour de France".) and was held upright by spectators; he was unconscious, with his hands locked on the handlebars. Hall and a nurse from the Tour's medical team took turns giving Simpson mouth-to-mouth resuscitation, before Dumas arrived with an oxygen mask. Approximately forty minutes after his collapse, a police helicopter took Simpson to nearby Avignon hospital, where he was pronounced dead at 5:40 p.m. Two empty tubes and a half-full one of amphetamines, one of which was labelled "Tonedron", were found in the rear pocket of his jersey. The official cause of death was "heart failure caused by exhaustion."

Tommy Simpson rode to his death in the Tour de France so doped that he did not know he had reached the limit of his endurance. He died in the saddle, slowly asphyxiated by intense effort in a heatwave after taking methylamphetamine drugs and alcoholic stimulants.

— Daily Mail reporter, J. L. Manning, broke the news that drugs were involved in Simpson's death, 31 July 1967.

On the next racing day, the other riders were reluctant to continue racing and asked the organisers for a postponement. France's Stablinski suggested that the race continue, with a British rider, whose team would wear black armbands, allowed to win the stage. Hoban won the stage, although many thought the stage winner should have been Denson, Simpson's close friend. Media reports suggested that his death was caused by heat exhaustion, until, on 31 July 1967 British journalist J. L. Manning of the Daily Mail broke the news about a formal connection between drugs and Simpson's death. French authorities confirmed that Simpson had traces of amphetamine in his body, impairing his judgement and allowing him to push himself beyond his limits. His death contributed to the introduction of mandatory testing for performance-enhancing drugs in cycling, leading to tests in 1968 at the Giro d'Italia, Tour de France and Summer Olympics. Simpson was buried in Harworth Cemetery, after a service at the 12th-century village church attended by an estimated 5,000 mourners, including Peugeot teammate Eddy Merckx, the only continental rider in attendance. The epitaph on Simpson's gravestone in Harworth cemetery reads, "His body ached, his legs grew tired, but still he would not give in", taken from a card left by his brother, Harry, following his death.

== Doping ==
Unlike the majority of his contemporaries, Simpson was open about the use of drugs in professional cycling. In 1960, interviewed by Chris Brasher for The Observer newspaper, Simpson spoke about his understanding of how riders could beat him, saying: "I know from the way they ride the next day they are taking dope. I don't want to have to take it – I have too much respect for my body." Two years before his death, Simpson hinted in the newspaper, The People, at drug-taking in races, although he implied that he himself was not involved. Asked about drugs by Eamonn Andrews on the BBC Home Service radio network, Simpson did not deny taking them; however, he said that a rider who frequently took drugs might get to the top but would not stay there.

In his biography of Simpson, Put Me Back on My Bike, William Fotheringham quoted Alan Ramsbottom as saying, "Tom went on the [1967] Tour de France with one suitcase for his kit and another with his stuff, drugs and recovery things", which Fotheringham said was confirmed by Simpson's roommate Colin Lewis. Ramsbottom added, "Tom took a lot of chances. He took a lot of it [drugs]. I remember him taking a course of strychnine to build up to some big event. He showed me the box, and had to take one every few days." (Note: Strychnine is one of the oldest drugs used in cycling. In small quantities it tightens the muscles.) although he implied that other competitors were involved. Lewis recalled Simpson acquiring a small box at their hotel. Simpson explained to him: "That's my year's supply of Micky Finns'. That lot cost me £800."

Commentator and Simpson's close friend David Saunders stated in his 1971 book, Cycling in the Sixties, that although he did not condone Simpson's use of drugs, he thought it was not the reason for his death. He said: "I am quite convinced that Simpson killed himself because he just did not know when to stop. All his racing life he had punished his frail body, pushing it to the limits of endurance with his tremendous will-power and single-mindedness and, on Mont Ventoux, he pushed it too far, perhaps the drug easing the pain of it all." Saunders went on to say that Simpson was not alone in the taking of drugs in professional cycling and that the authorities ignored their use. His opinion was that Simpson did not take drugs to gain an unfair advantage, but because "he was not going to be beaten by a pill".

== Riding style and legacy ==
Simpson in his adolescence was described as fearsome in descent by fellow Scala Wheelers club member George Shaw, who explained that if Simpson dropped behind on a climb, he would come back on the descent. Simpson's risk-taking on descents was evident throughout his career, crashing in four out of the seven Tours de France he competed in. Track rider Norman Sheil recalled: "When racing on a banked velodrome, Simpson would sometimes ride up the advertising boards at the top of the bankings, Wall of Death-style, to please the crowds." Simpson's death was attributed to his unwillingness to admit defeat ascending Mont Ventoux. He described a near-death experience during a race in 1964, the Trofeo Baracchi two-man time trial, to Vin Denson, who recalled: "He said he felt peace of mind and wasn't afraid to die. He said he would have been happy dying."

Simpson looked for any advantage over his opponents. He made his own saddle, a design which is now standard. During his time with Peugeot, he rode bikes made by Italian manufacturer Masi that resembled Peugeots. Simpson was obsessed with dieting since 1956, when he was mentored by Cyril Cartwright. Simpson understood the value of fruit and vegetables after reading Les Cures de jus by nutritionist Raymond Dextreit; during the winter, he would consume 10 lb (4.5 kg) of carrots a day. Other unusual food preferences included pigeons, duck and trout skin, raspberry leaves and garlic in large quantities.

In the 1968 Tour de France, there was a special prize given in his honour, the Souvenir Tom Simpson, a sprint on stage 15 in the small town of Mirepoix, won by the soloing Roger Pingeon. Winner of the race Jan Janssen said of him, "Occasionally Tommy could be annoying. When it was rolling along at 30kmh and - paf!… he’d attack. Oh leave us alone! There's still 150km to go pipe down. But often, he wanted war." Janssen went on to say, "Even in the feed zones. It's not the law, but it's not polite. Musettes (lunch bags) were up in the air there was panic and crashes. It was Simpson acting like a jerk. It didn't happen often. Occasionally I was angry at him. I’d say to him in his native English: You f*****g c**t... There were often many teams, five or six, in the same hotel together every evening. Each had their own table. And at a certain moment, Tommy walked into the restaurant like a gentleman, with a cane, bowler hat and in costume… He was like a Lord in England and the rest of us were in tracksuits. Everyone saw that, laughed, and the things he had done during the race were forgotten."

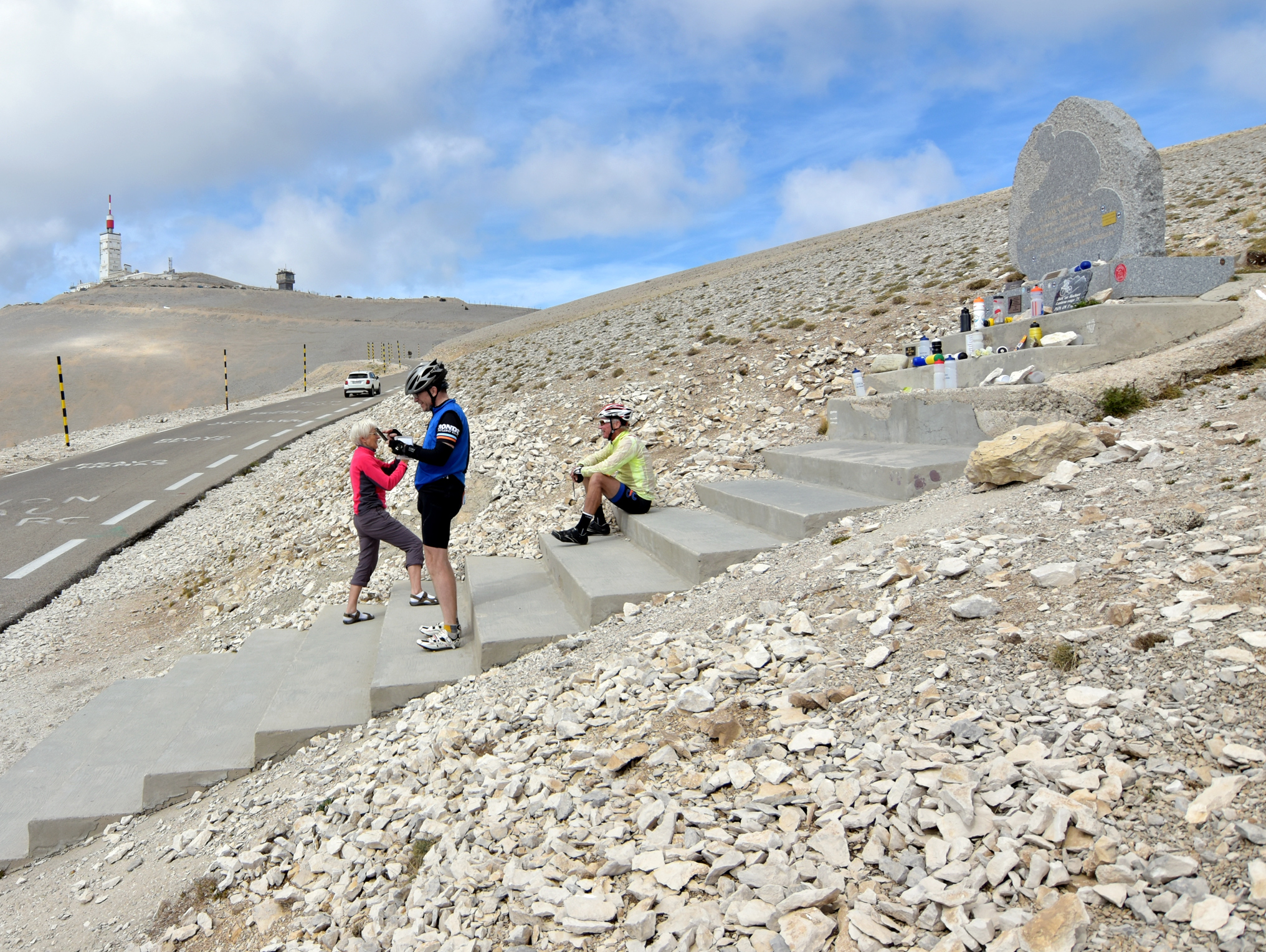
The memorial to Simpson (pictured in 2009) on the spot where he died on Mont Ventoux has become a pilgrimage for many cyclists.

A granite memorial to Simpson, with the words "Olympic medallist, world champion, British sporting ambassador", stands on the spot where he collapsed and died on Ventoux, one kilometre east of the summit. Cycling began a fund for a monument a week after Simpson's death, raising about £1,500. The memorial was unveiled in 1968. It has become a site of pilgrimage for cyclists, who frequently leave cycling-related objects, such as water bottles and caps, in tribute. In nearby Bédoin, a plaque was installed in the town square by journalists following the 1967 Tour. The Harworth and Bircotes Sports and Social Club has a small museum dedicated to Simpson, opened by Belgian cyclist Lucien Van Impe in August 2001. In 1997, to commemorate the 30th anniversary of his death, a small plaque was added to the Mont Ventoux memorial, with the words "There is no mountain too high. Your daughters Jane and Joanne, July 13, 1997", and a replica of the memorial was erected outside the museum. In his adopted hometown of Ghent, there is a bust of Simpson at the entrance to the Kuipke velodrome. Every year since his death, the Tom Simpson Memorial Race has taken place in Harworth.

Ray Pascoe, a fan, made the 1995 film Something To Aim At, a project he began in the years following Simpson's death; the film includes interviews with those closest to Simpson. The 2005 documentary Wheels Within Wheels follows actor Simon Dutton as he searches for people and places in Simpson's life. Dutton's four-year project chronicles the midlife crisis that sparked his quest to rediscover Simpson. British rider David Millar won stage twelve of the 2012 Tour de France on the 45th anniversary of Simpson's death; previously banned from cycling for using performance-enhancing drugs, he paid tribute to Simpson and reinforced the importance of learning from his – and Simpson's – mistakes. Millar wrote the introduction for a reissue of Simpson's autobiography, Cycling Is My Life, published in 2009. In 2010, Simpson was inducted into the British Cycling Hall of Fame. He inspired Simpson Magazine, which began in March 2013. According to the magazine's creators, “It was Simpson's spirit and style, his legendary tenacity and his ability to suffer that endeared him to cycling fans everywhere as much as the trophies he won.”

== Family and interests ==
Soon after moving to France in 1959, Simpson met Helen Sherburn. They married in 1961, before moving to Ghent, Belgium, the following year. They had two daughters, Jane (born April 1962) and Joanne (born May 1963), who were brought up, and live, in Belgium. After his death, Helen Simpson married Barry Hoban in December 1969. Simpson is the maternal uncle of retired Belgian-Australian cyclist Matthew Gilmore, whose father, Graeme, was also a cyclist. The 2000 book Mr. Tom: The True Story of Tom Simpson, written by Simpson's nephew, Chris Sidwells, focuses on his career and family life.

Simpson spoke fluent French, and was also competent in Flemish and Italian. He was interested in vintage cars, and his driving and riding styles were similar; Helen remembered, "Driving through the West End of London at 60 mph (97 km/h), was nothing." In January 1966, Simpson was a guest castaway on BBC Radio 4's Desert Island Discs; his favourite musical piece was "Ari's Theme" from Exodus by the London Festival Orchestra, his book choice was The Pickwick Papers and his luxury item was golf equipment. Helen said that she chose his records for the show, since he was not interested in music. Simpson's autobiography, Cycling Is My Life, was first published in 1966.

== Career achievements ==
=== Major results ===
1955
1st BLRC National Junior Hill Climb Championship
1956
2nd Individual pursuit, Amateur National Track Championships
3rd Team pursuit, Olympic Games
1957
1st BLRC National Hill Climb Championship
1st Individual pursuit, Amateur National Track Championships
1958
1st Individual pursuit, Amateur National Track Championships
2nd Individual pursuit, British Empire and Commonwealth Games
1959 (2 pro wins)
Tour de l'Ouest

1st Stages 4 & 5b (ITT)

1st Stage 8 Route de France
2nd Overall Essor Breton
4th Road race, UCI Road World Championships
4th Trofeo Baracchi (with Gérard Saint)
5th GP Martini
7th Circuit de l'Aulne
1960 (2)
1st Overall Tour du Sud-Est
1st Stage 1b (TTT) Four Days of Dunkirk
1st Mont Faron hill climb
3rd Overall Genoa–Rome

1st Mountains classification

7th La Flèche Wallonne
9th Paris–Roubaix
1961 (2)
1st Tour of Flanders
1st Stage 2 Euskal Bizikleta
2nd Overall Menton–Rome

1st Points classification

5th Overall Paris–Nice

1st Stage 3 (TTT)

9th Road race, UCI Road World Championships
1962
2nd Overall Paris–Nice

1st Stage 3a (TTT)

2nd Overall Paris–Saint-Étienne
3rd Critérium des As
3rd Six Days of Madrid (with John Tressider)
5th Tour of Flanders

1st Mountains classification

6th Overall Tour de France

Held after Stage 12

6th Gent–Wevelgem
1963 (3)
1st Bordeaux–Paris
1st Isle of Man International
1st Grand Prix du Parisien
2nd Overall Tour du Var

1st Stage 1

2nd Overall Super Prestige Pernod International
2nd Critérium des As
2nd Gent–Wevelgem
2nd Paris–Brussels
2nd De Kustpijl
2nd Paris–Tours
3rd Tour of Flanders
8th Paris–Roubaix
10th La Flèche Wallonne
10th Giro di Lombardia
1964 (2)
1st Milan–San Remo
1st Stage 5 Circuit de Provençal
2nd Kuurne–Brussels–Kuurne
2nd Mont Faron hill climb
3rd Trofeo Baracchi (with Rudi Altig)
4th Road race, UCI Road World Championships
10th Paris–Roubaix
1965 (2)
1st Road race, UCI Road World Championships
1st Giro di Lombardia
1st London–Holyhead
1st Six Days of Brussels (with Peter Post)
2nd Six Days of Ghent (with Peter Post)
2nd Overall Super Prestige Pernod International
3rd Overall Midi Libre
3rd La Flèche Wallonne

1st Mountains classification

3rd Overall Circuit de Provençal
3rd Bordeaux–Paris
5th Harelbeke–Antwerp–Harelbeke
6th Paris–Roubaix
6th Circuit des Onze Villes
6th GP Forli
7th GP Union Dortmund
8th Overall Escalada a Montjuïc
10th Liège–Bastogne–Liège
1966
1st Stage 2b (TTT) Four Days of Dunkirk
2nd Six Days of Münster (with Klaus Bugdahl)
2nd Grand Prix of Aargau Canton
1967 (5)
1st Overall Paris–Nice
Vuelta a España

1st Stages 5 & 16

1st Isle of Man International
1st Stage 5 Giro di Sardegna
3rd Six Days of Antwerp (with Leo Proost and Emile Severeyns)
4th Polymultipliée

=== Grand Tour general classification results timeline ===
Grand Tour	1960	1961	1962	1963	1964	1965	1966	1967
Vuelta a España	—	—	—	—	—	—	—	33
Giro d'Italia	—	—	—	—	—	—	—	—
Tour de France	29	DNF	6	—	14	DNF	DNF	DNF

=== Monuments results timeline ===
Monument	1959	1960	1961	1962	1963	1964	1965	1966	1967
Milan–San Remo	—	38	25	—	19	1	DNF	—	70
Tour of Flanders	—	—	1	5	3	—	—	—	—
Paris–Roubaix	—	9	88	37	8	10	6	—	DNF
Liège–Bastogne–Liège	—	11	—	—	33	—	10	DNF	—
Giro di Lombardia	DNF	84	—	—	10	21	1	—	—

Legend
—	Did not compete
DNF	Did not finish

=== Awards and honours ===
- British Cycling Federation Personality of the Year: 1962, 1965
- BBC Sports Personality of the Year: 1965
- Bidlake Memorial Prize: 1965
- Daily Express Sportsman of the Year: 1965
- Freedom of Sint-Amandsberg: 1965
- Sports Journalists' Association Sportsman of the Year: 1965
- British Cycling Hall of Fame: 2010

== See also ==
- List of British cyclists
- List of British cyclists who have led the Tour de France general classification
- List of Desert Island Discs episodes (1961–70)
- List of doping cases in cycling
- List of Olympic medalists in cycling (men)
- List of cyclists with a cycling-related death
- Yellow jersey statistics

== Notes and references ==
=== Bibliography ===
- Dauncey, Hugh; Hare, Geoff (2003). The Tour De France, 1903–2003: A Century of Sporting Structures, Meanings and Values. London: Frank Cass & Co. ISBN 978-0-203-50241-9.
- Fotheringham, William (2003). A Century of Cycling: The Classic Races and Legendary Champions. London: Mitchell Beazley. ISBN 978-0-7603-1553-8.
- Fotheringham, William (2007) [1st. pub. 2002]. Put Me Back on My Bike: In Search of Tom Simpson. London: Yellow Jersey Press. ISBN 978-0-224-08018-7.
- Fotheringham, William (2012). Merckx: Half Man, Half Bike. London: Yellow Jersey Press. ISBN 978-0-224-09195-4.
- Henderson, Jon (2011). Best of British: Hendo's Sporting Heroes. London: Yellow Jersey Press. ISBN 978-1-4481-1341-5.
- Houlihan, Barrie (2002). Dying to Win: Doping in Sport And the Development of Anti-doping Policy, Part 996 (2nd ed.). Strasbourg, France: Council of Europe. ISBN 978-92-871-4685-4.
- Mazanov, Jason (2013). Towards a Social Science of Drugs in Sport. London: Routledge. ISBN 978-1-317-98454-2.
- McGann, Bill; McGann, Carol (2006). The Story of the Tour De France, Volume 1: 1903–1964. Indianapolis, IN: Dog Ear Publishing. ISBN 978-1-59858-180-5.
- McGann, Bill; McGann, Carol (2008). The Story of the Tour De France, Volume 2: 1965–2007. Indianapolis, IN: Dog Ear Publishing. ISBN 978-1-59858-608-4.
- Mehlman, Maxwell J. (2009). The Price of Perfection: Individualism and Society in the Era of Biomedical Enhancement. Baltimore, MD: JHU Press. ISBN 978-0-8018-9538-8.
- Pierre, Roger St. (1967). Tom Simpson: An 80 Page Picture Tribute to Britain's Greatest Ever Road Cycling Champion. London: Daily Mirror.
- Saunders, David (1971). Cycling in the Sixties. London: Pelham Books. ISBN 978-0-7207-0456-3.
- Sidwells, Chris (2000). Mr Tom: True Story of Tom Simpson. Norwich, UK: Mousehold Press. ISBN 978-1-874739-14-2.
- Simpson, Tommy (2009) [1st. pub. Stanley Paul:1966]. Cycling is My Life. London: Yellow Jersey Press. ISBN 978-0-224-08308-9.
- Wilcockson, John (2009). Lance: The Making of the World's Greatest Champion. Cambridge, MA: Da Capo Press. ISBN 978-0-7867-4805-1.
- Williams, Nicola; Le Nevez, Catherine (2007) [1st. pub. 1999]. Provence and the Côte d'Azur (5th ed.). Melbourne: Lonely Planet. ISBN 978-1-74104-236-8.
- Woodland, Les (2007) [1st. pub. 2003]. The Yellow Jersey Companion to the Tour de France. London: Yellow Jersey Press. ISBN 978-0-224-08016-3.

Sporting positions
Preceded by Jo de Roo	Winner of Bordeaux–Paris; 1963	Succeeded by Michel Nédélec
Preceded by Jacques Anquetil	Winner of Paris–Nice; 1967	Succeeded by Rolf Wolfshohl
