= 1965 La Flèche Wallonne =

Race details
- Dates: 29 April 1965
- Stages: 1
- Distance: 215 km (133.6 mi)
- Winning time: 6h 21' 48"

Results
	Winner	Roberto Poggiali (ITA)	(Ignis)
	Second	Felice Gimondi (ITA)	(Salvarani)
	Third	Tom Simpson (GBR)	(Peugeot–BP–Michelin)

The 1965 La Flèche Wallonne was the 29th edition of La Flèche Wallonne cycle race and was held on 29 April 1965. The race started in Liège and finished in Marcinelle. The race was won by Roberto Poggiali of the Ignis team.

== General classification ==
Final general classification

Rank	Rider	Team	Time
1	Roberto Poggiali (ITA)	Ignis	6h 21' 48"
2	Felice Gimondi (ITA)	Salvarani	+ 0"
3	Tom Simpson (GBR)	Peugeot–BP–Michelin	+ 31"
4	Willy Bocklant (BEL)	Flandria–Romeo	+ 1' 45"
5	Georges Van Coningsloo (BEL)	Peugeot–BP–Michelin	+ 2' 59"
6	Carmine Preziosi (ITA)	Pelforth–Sauvage–Lejeune	+ 2' 59"
7	Roger Verheyden (BEL)	Lamot–Libertas	+ 2' 59"
8	Cees van Espen (NED)	Televizier	+ 2' 59"
9	Gilbert Desmet (BEL)	Wiel's–Groene Leeuw	+ 2' 59"
10	Jos Huysmans (BEL)	Dr. Mann	+ 2' 59"
