= 1967 Paris–Nice =

Race details
- Dates: 8–15 March 1967
- Stages: 8
- Distance: 1,104 km (686 mi)
- Winning time: 29h 53' 58"

Results
Jersey awarded to the overall winner	Winner	Tom Simpson (GBR)	(Peugeot–BP–Michelin)
	Second	Bernard Guyot (FRA)	(Pelforth–Sauvage–Lejeune)
	Third	Rolf Wolfshohl (GER)	(Bic)
Jersey awarded to the points classification winner	Points	Jean-Claude Wuillemin (FRA)	(Pelforth–Wild–Lejeune)
	Mountains	Bernard Guyot (FRA)	(Pelforth–Wild–Lejeune)
	Combination	Bernard Guyot (FRA)	(Pelforth–Wild–Lejeune)
	Team	Pelforth–Wild–Lejeune	

The 1967 Paris–Nice was the 25th running of the Paris–Nice cycling stage race, often known as the Race to the Sun. It started on 8 March in Athis-Mons, south of Paris, and ended on 15 March in Nice and consisted of eight stages, including an individual time trial. A total of 96 riders from twelve teams entered the race, which was won by Briton Tom Simpson of the Peugeot–BP–Michelin team.

Simpson became the first British rider to win the Paris–Nice general classification. In the other race classifications, Bernard Guyot of Pelforth–Wild–Lejeune won the mountains classification, Jean-Claude Wuillemin of Pelforth–Wild–Lejeune took the points classification green jersey. Pelforth–Wild–Lejeune finished as the winners of the team classification, which ranks each of the twelve teams contesting the race by lowest cumulative time.

== Teams ==
Twelve teams were invited to participate in the 1967 edition of the Paris–Nice. One of the teams, Beer 33-Gitane, was amateur. Each team sent a squad of eight riders, which meant that the race started with a peloton of 96 cyclists. From the riders that began the race, 83 made it to the finish in Nice.

The teams entering the race were:

- Bic
- Beer 33-Gitane (amateur)
- Flandria–De Clerck
- Kamome–Wolber
- Mann–Grundig
- Mercier–BP–Hutchinson
- Pelforth–Wild–Lejeune
- Peugeot–BP–Michelin
- Romeo–Smith's–Plume Sport
- Salvarani
- Tigra–Grammont–de Gribaldy
- Willem II–Gazelle

== Stages ==
=== Stage 1 ===
8 March 1967 — Athis-Mons to Châteaurenard, 146 km (90.7 mi)

Stage 1 result

	Cyclist	Team	Time
1	Guido Reybrouck (BEL)	Romeo–Smith's–Plume Sport	3h 31' 1"
2	Adriano Durante (ITA)	Salvarani	s.t.
3	Raymond Steegmans (BEL)	Bic	s.t.
4	Daniel Van Ryckeghem (BEL)	Mann–Grundig	s.t.

=== Stage 2 ===
9 March 1967 — Châteaurenard to Château-Chinon, 148 km (92.0 mi)

Stage 2 result

	Cyclist	Team	Time
1	Eddy Merckx (BEL)	Peugeot–BP–Michelin	3h 56' 20"
2	Georges Chappe (FRA)	Mercier–BP–Hutchinson	+1' 11"
3	Jaak De Boever (BEL)	Romeo–Smith's–Plume Sport	+1' 20"
4	Paul Gutty (FRA)	Tigra–Grammont–de Gribaldy	+1' 21"
5	Jos Huysmans (BEL)	Mann–Grundig	s.t.
6	Daniel Van Ryckeghem (BEL)	Mann–Grundig	s.t.
7	Michel Grain (FRA)	Bic	s.t.
8	Rolf Wolfshohl (GER)	Bic	s.t.
9	Raymond Poulidor (FRA)	Mercier–BP–Hutchinson	s.t.
10	Willy Bocklant (BEL)	Flandria–De Clerck	s.t.

=== Stage 3 ===
10 March 1967 — Lucy-sur-Cure to Saint-Étienne, 195 km (121.2 mi)

Stage 3 result

	Cyclist	Team	Time
1	Guido Reybrouck (BEL)	Romeo–Smith's–Plume Sport	5h 22' 5"
2	Walter Godefroot (BEL)	Flandria–De Clerck	s.t.
3	Jan Janssen (NED)	Pelforth–Wild–Lejeune	s.t.
4	Roger Rosiers (BEL)	Mann–Grundig	s.t.
5	Ludo Vandromme (BEL)	Mann–Grundig	s.t.
6	Adriano Durante (ITA)	Salvarani	s.t.
7	Rik Van Looy (BEL)	Willem II–Gazelle	s.t.
8	Noël Vanclooster (BEL)	Flandria–De Clerck	s.t.
9	Michel Grain (FRA)	Bic	s.t.

=== Stage 4 ===
11 March 1967 — Saint-Étienne to Bollène, 183 km (113.7 mi)

Stage 4 result

	Cyclist	Team	Time
1	Rik Van Looy (BEL)	Willem II–Gazelle	4h 41' 52"
2	Walter Godefroot (BEL)	Flandria–De Clerck	s.t.
3	Tom Simpson (GBR)	Peugeot–BP–Michelin	s.t.
4	Lucien Aimar (FRA)	Bic	s.t.
5	Bernard Guyot (FRA)	Pelforth–Wild–Lejeune	s.t.
6	Rolf Wolfshohl (GER)	Bic	s.t.
7	Gilbert Desmet (BEL)	Romeo–Smith's–Plume Sport	s.t.
8	Italo Zilioli (ITA)	Salvarani	s.t.
9	Henri De Wolf (BEL)	Willem II–Gazelle	s.t.
10	Charly Grosskost (FRA)	Peugeot–BP–Michelin	s.t.

=== Stage 5 ===
12 March 1967 — Bollène to Marignane, 172 km (106.9 mi)

Stage 5 result

	Cyclist	Team	Time
1	André Desvages (FRA)	Peugeot–BP–Michelin	4h 4' 4"
2	Jan Janssen (NED)	Pelforth–Wild–Lejeune	s.t.
3	Guido Reybrouck (BEL)	Romeo–Smith's–Plume Sport	s.t.
4	Adriano Durante (ITA)	Salvarani	s.t.
5	Jos Huysmans (BEL)	Mann–Grundig	s.t.
6	Julien Stevens (BEL)	Willem II–Gazelle	s.t.
7	Victor Van Schil (BEL)	Flandria–De Clerck	s.t.
8	Roger Rosiers (BEL)	Mann–Grundig	s.t.
9	Michel Grain (FRA)	Bic	s.t.
10	Ludo Vandromme (BEL)	Mann–Grundig	s.t.

=== Stage 6 ===
13 March 1967 — Marignane to Hyères, 142 km (88.2 mi)

Stage 6 result

	Cyclist	Team	Time
1	Eddy Merckx (BEL)	Peugeot–BP–Michelin	3h 32' 41"
2	Tom Simpson (GBR)	Peugeot–BP–Michelin	s.t.
3	Lucien Aimar (FRA)	Bic	+1' 26"
4	Rolf Wolfshohl (GER)	Bic	s.t.
5	Bernard Guyot (FRA)	Pelforth–Wild–Lejeune	+2' 9"
6	Jos Huysmans (BEL)	Mann–Grundig	+2' 19"
7	Charly Grosskost (FRA)	Peugeot–BP–Michelin	+4' 16"
8	Raymond Poulidor (FRA)	Mercier–BP–Hutchinson	s.t.
9	Louis Pfenninger (SWI)	Tigra–Grammont–de Gribaldy	s.t.
10	Victor Van Schil (BEL)	Flandria–De Clerck	s.t.

=== Stage 7 ===
14 March 1967 — Hyères to Antibes, 168 km (104.4 mi)

Stage 7 result

	Cyclist	Team	Time
1	André Desvages (FRA)	Peugeot–BP–Michelin	4h 4' 6"
2	Bernard Van de Kerckhove (BEL)	Pelforth–Wild–Lejeune	+25"
3	Guido Reybrouck (BEL)	Romeo–Smith's–Plume Sport	s.t.
4	Willy Bocklant (BEL)	Flandria–De Clerck	s.t.
5	Jo de Roo (NED)	Willem II–Gazelle	s.t.
6	Jan Janssen (NED)	Pelforth–Wild–Lejeune	s.t.
7	Raymond Steegmans (BEL)	Bic	s.t.
8	Michel Grain (FRA)	Bic	s.t.

=== Stage 8 ===
15 March 1967 — Antibes to Nice, 28 km (17.4 mi) individual time trial (ITT)

Stage 8 result

	Cyclist	Team	Time
1	Bernard Guyot (FRA)	Pelforth–Sauvage–Lejeune	40' 1"
2	Rolf Wolfshohl (GER)	Bic	+2"
3	Jacques Anquetil (FRA)	Bic	+11"
4	Eddy Merckx (BEL)	Peugeot–BP–Michelin	+19"
5	Raymond Poulidor (FRA)	Mercier–BP–Hutchinson	+38"
6	Ferdinand Bracke (BEL)	Peugeot–BP–Michelin	+39"
7	Felice Gimondi (ITA)	Salvarani	+52"
8	Gilbert Desmet (BEL)	Romeo–Smith's–Plume Sport	+1' 4"
9	Louis Pfenninger (SWI)	Tigra–Grammont–de Gribaldy	+1' 14"
10	Georges Chappe (FRA)	Mercier–BP–Hutchinson	+1' 18"

== Final general classification ==
Final General Classification Result

	Cyclist	Team	Time
1	Tom Simpson (GBR)	Peugeot–BP–Michelin	29h 53' 58"
2	Bernard Guyot (FRA)	Pelforth–Wild–Lejeune	+2' 7"
3	Rolf Wolfshohl (GER)	Bic	+3' 47"
4	Lucien Aimar (FRA)	Bic	+4' 12"
5	Jaak De Boever (BEL)	Romeo–Smith's–Plume Sport	+6' 48"
6	Rik Van Looy (BEL)	Willem II–Gazelle	+9' 31"
7	Italo Zilioli (ITA)	Salvarani	+10' 17"
8	Gilbert Desmet (BEL)	Romeo–Smith's–Plume Sport	+10' 24"
9	Walter Godefroot (BEL)	Flandria–De Clerck	+12' 23"
10	Eddy Merckx (BEL)	Peugeot–BP–Michelin	+18' 46"
