= 1964 Paris–Roubaix =

Race details
- Dates: 19 April 1964
- Stages: 1
- Distance: 265 km (164.7 mi)
- Winning time: 5h 52' 19"

Results
	Winner	Peter Post (NED)	(Flandria–Romeo)
	Second	Benoni Beheyt (BEL)	(Wiel's–Groene Leeuw)
	Third	Yvo Molenaers (BEL)	(Wiel's–Groene Leeuw)

The 1964 Paris–Roubaix was the 62nd edition of the Paris–Roubaix cycle race and was held on 19 April 1964. The race started in Compiègne and finished in Roubaix. The race was won by Peter Post of the Flandria team.

== General classification ==
Final general classification

Rank	Rider	Team	Time
1	Peter Post (NED)	Flandria–Romeo	5h 52' 19"
2	Benoni Beheyt (BEL)	Wiel's–Groene Leeuw	+ 0"
3	Yvo Molenaers (BEL)	Wiel's–Groene Leeuw	+ 0"
4	Willy Bocklant (BEL)	Flandria–Romeo	+ 0"
5	Louis Proost (BEL)	Solo–Superia	+ 2' 28"
6	Frans Melckenbeeck (BEL)	Mercier–BP–Hutchinson	+ 2' 32"
7	Jean Stablinski (FRA)	Saint-Raphaël–Gitane–Dunlop	+ 2' 32"
8	Jan Janssen (NED)	Pelforth–Sauvage–Lejeune	+ 2' 32"
9	Gilbert Desmet (BEL)	Wiel's–Groene Leeuw	+ 2' 32"
10	Tom Simpson (GBR)	Peugeot–BP–Englebert	+ 2' 32"
