= Gilbert Desmet =

Belgian cyclist (1931–2024)

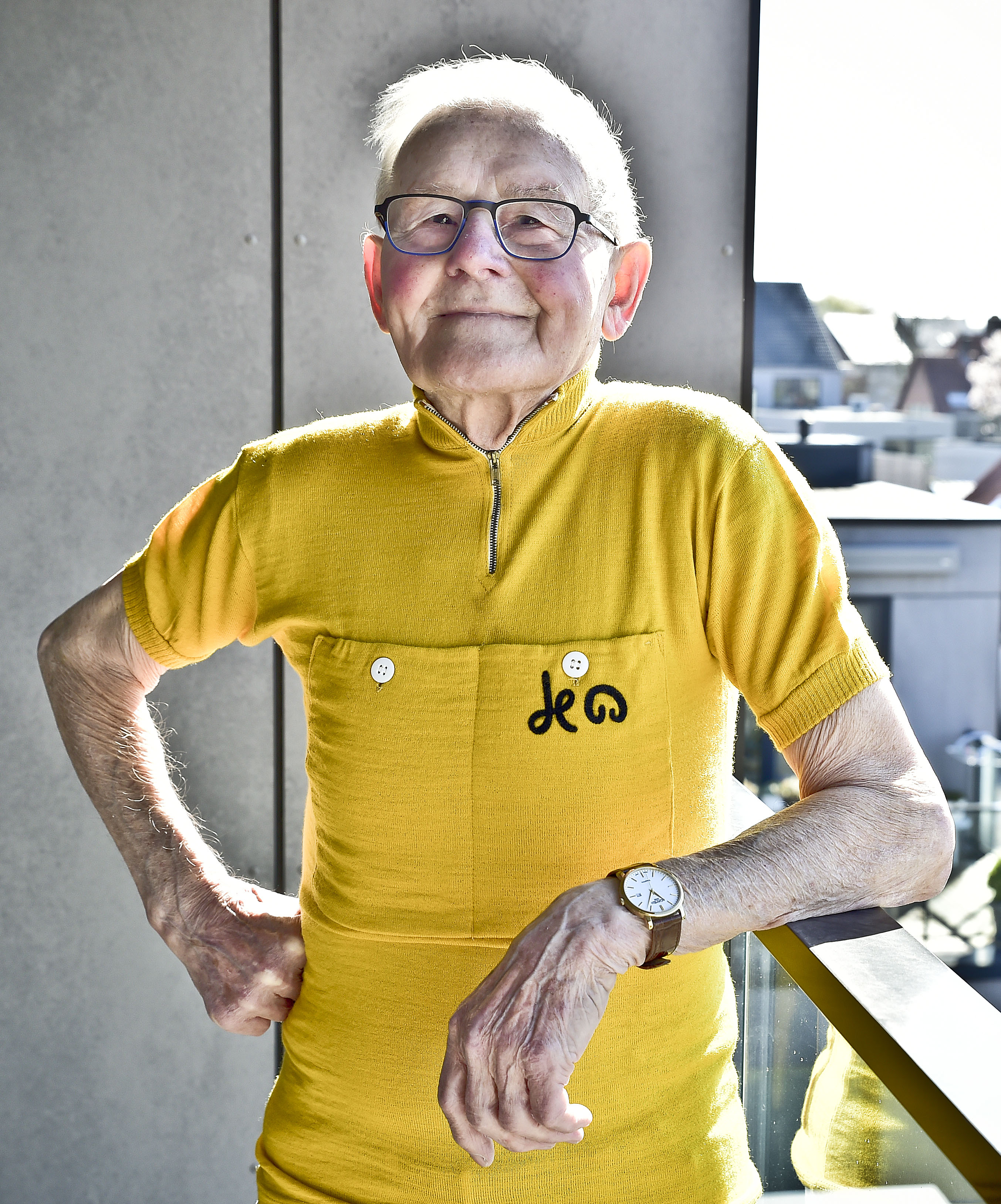
- Desmet in 2019

Personal information
- Nickname: Smetje van Lichtervelde
- Born: 2 February 1931 Roeselare, Belgium
- Died: 30 June 2024 (aged 93) Rumbeke, Belgium

Cycling career
- Sport: Cycling
- Discipline: Road
- Role: Rider

Professional teams
- 1952–1955: Groene Leeuw
- 1956: Bertin–d'Allessandro
- 1957–1959: Faema–Guerra
- 1959–1962: Carpano
- 1963–1965: Wiel's–Groene Leeuw
- 1966–1967: Roméo–Smith's

Major wins
- Paris–Tours (1958); La Flèche Wallone (1964); Four Days of Dunkirk (1964); Kuurne–Brussels–Kuurne (1958)

Gilbert Desmet (2 February 1931 – 30 June 2024), nicknamed Smetje van Lichtervelde, was a Belgian cyclist who was professional from 1952 to 1967. In the 1956 Tour de France, he wore the yellow jersey for two days, and in the 1963 Tour de France he wore it for nine days. Desmet won 101 professional races, including Paris–Tours, La Flèche Wallonne and Four Days of Dunkirk. His best result in the Tour de France was his 4th place in 1962. He finished second in the 1959 Paris–Roubaix. In total, Desmet won 101 professional races.

Throughout his career, he was often confused with Gilbert De Smet, another Belgian cyclist with a similar name.

Desmet died on 30 June 2024, at the age of 93.

== Major results ==
Yellow jersey of Desmet worn in the 1963 Tour de France

1951
2nd Kattekoers
1954
1st GP Stad Zottegem
8th Omloop Het Volk
1955
1st Textielprijs Vichte
1956
Tour de France

Held after Stages 3–4a

1st Overall Drielandentrofee

1st Stage 1

1st Omloop van Oost-Vlaanderen
2nd Overall Four Days of Dunkirk
2nd Vijfbergenomloop
1957
1st Omloop van het Houtland
2nd Overall Driedaagse van Antwerpen
6th Kuurne–Brussels–Kuurne
1958
1st Paris–Tours
1st Kuurne–Brussels–Kuurne
1st Omloop van het Houtland
1st Stage 7 Vuelta a España
2nd Grand Prix Jules Lowie
3rd GP Lugano
1959
1st Vijfbergenomloop
2nd Paris–Roubaix
3rd Tour of Flanders
3rd Overall Vuelta a la Comunidad Valenciana
5th La Flèche Wallonne
8th Gent–Wevelgem
8th Overall Giro di Sardegna
9th Liège–Bastogne–Liège
1960
1st Overall Menton–Genoa–Rome

1st Stage 1

1st Kampioenschap van Vlaanderen
1st Grand Prix Jules Lowie
1st Stage 3 Paris–Nice
2nd GP Lugano
4th Tour of Flanders
5th Kuurne–Brussels–Kuurne
7th Paris–Roubaix
1961
1st Gran Premio Industria e Commercio di Prato
1st Stage 1 Giro di Sardegna
2nd Paris–Tours
2nd Paris–Brussels
2nd Grand Prix des Nations
3rd Trofeo Matteotti
7th Gent–Wevelgem
10th Paris–Roubaix
1962
1st De Kustpijl
1st Omloop der drie Provinciën
4th Overall Tour de France
4th Overall Tour de Suisse

1st Stage 5

1963
Tour de France

Held after Stages 6–16

6th Road race, UCI Road World Championships
7th Grand Prix des Nations
9th Milan–San Remo
1964
1st Overall Four Days of Dunkirk
1st La Flèche Wallonne
1st Stage 2 Tour de Luxembourg
3rd Overall Tour of Belgium
5th Paris–Brussels
6th Brabantse Pijl
8th Overall Tour de France
9th Tour of Flanders
9th Paris–Roubaix
1965
1st Omloop van het Houtland
1st Stage 2b Critérium du Dauphiné Libéré
2nd Overall Tour of Belgium
8th Liège–Bastogne–Liège
9th La Flèche Wallonne
1966
2nd Omloop van het Houtland
1967
8th Overall Paris–Nice
1968
1st Ronde van Oost-Vlaanderen

== Notes ==
- Cornillië, Patrick (1994). Lichtervelde op twee wielen (in Dutch). De Beer.
- Cornillië, Patrick (2004). Gilbert Desmet – Smetje van Lichtervelde (in Dutch). De Eecloonaar. ISBN 90-74128-99-8
