= 1964 Milan–San Remo =

- Profile of the race

Race details
- Dates: March 19, 1964
- Stages: 1
- Distance: 288 km (179 mi)
- Winning time: 6h 37' 59"

Results
	Winner	Tom Simpson (GBR)	(Peugeot–BP–Englebert)
	Second	Raymond Poulidor (FRA)	(Mercier–Hutchinson)
	Third	Willy Bocklant (BEL)	(Flandria–Romeo)

The 1964 Milan–San Remo cycling race took place on March 19, 1964, and was won by Peugeot–BP–Englebert's Tom Simpson, becoming the first British winner. It was the 55th edition of the Milan–San Remo "monument" classic race. Simpson set a record pace for the event at 43.420 km/h.

== Results ==
	Cyclist	Team	Time
1	Tom Simpson (GBR)	Peugeot–BP–Englebert	6h 37' 59"
2	Raymond Poulidor (FRA)	Mercier–Hutchinson	+2"
3	Willy Bocklant (BEL)	Flandria–Romeo	+1' 1"
4	Rik Van Looy (BEL)	Solo–Superia	+1' 9"
5	Georges Van Coningsloo (BEL)	Peugeot–BP–Englebert	s.t.
6	Jean Graczyk (FRA)	Margnat–Paloma	s.t.
7	Renato Pelizzoni (ITA)	Ignis	s.t.
8	Edward Sels (BEL)	Solo–Superia	s.t.
9	Jean Forestier (FRA)	Peugeot–BP–Englebert	s.t.
10	Yvo Molenaers (BEL)	Wiel's–Groene Leeuw	s.t.
