= 1963 Paris–Tours =

Race details
- Dates: 6 October 1963
- Stages: 1
- Distance: 255 km (158.4 mi)
- Winning time: 6h 30' 41"

Results
| | Winner | Jo de Roo (NED) |
| | Second | Tom Simpson (GBR) |
| | Third | Raymond Poulidor (FRA) |

The 1963 Paris–Tours was the 57th edition of the Paris–Tours cycle race and was held on 6 October 1963. The race started in Paris and finished in Tours. The race was won by Jo de Roo.

== General classification ==
Final general classification

| Rank | Rider | Time |
|---|---|---|
| 1 | Jo de Roo (NED) | 6h 30' 41" |
| 2 | Tom Simpson (GBR) | + 0" |
| 3 | Raymond Poulidor (FRA) | + 0" |
| 4 | Carmine Preziosi (ITA) | + 0" |
| 5 | Willy Bocklant (BEL) | + 0" |
| 6 | Rolf Wolfshohl (FRG) | + 0" |
| 7 | Norbert Kerckhove (BEL) | + 0" |
| 8 | Luis Otaño (ESP) | + 0" |
| 9 | Ferdinand Bracke (BEL) | + 0" |
| 10 | Frans Melckenbeeck (BEL) | + 0" |
