= 1958 Paris–Tours =

Race details
- Dates: 5 October 1958
- Stages: 1
- Distance: 251 km (156.0 mi)
- Winning time: 6h 45' 24"

Results
	Winner	Gilbert Desmet (BEL)
	Second	Fred De Bruyne (BEL)
	Third	François Mahé (FRA)

The 1958 Paris–Tours was the 52nd edition of the Paris–Tours cycle race and was held on 5 October 1958. The race started in Paris and finished in Tours. The race was won by Gilbert Desmet.

== General classification ==
Final general classification

Rank	Rider	Time
1	Gilbert Desmet (BEL)	6h 45' 24"
2	Fred De Bruyne (BEL)	+ 0"
3	François Mahé (FRA)	+ 0"
4	Rik Van Looy (BEL)	+ 0"
5	André Vlayen (BEL)	+ 0"
6	André Darrigade (FRA)	+ 0"
7	Leon Vandaele (BEL)	+ 0"
8	Jacques Dupont (FRA)	+ 0"
9	Joseph Groussard (FRA)	+ 0"
10	Tino Sabbadini (FRA)	+ 0"
