= 1962 Paris–Nice =

Race details
- Dates: 9–17 March 1962
- Stages: 9
- Distance: 1,565.6 km (972.8 mi)
- Winning time: 39h 04' 45"

Results
Jersey awarded to the overall winner	Winner	Jef Planckaert (BEL)	(Flandria–Faema–Clément)
	Second	Tom Simpson (GBR)	(Gitane–Leroux–Dunlop–R. Geminiani)
	Third	Rolf Wolfshohl (FRG)	(Gitane–Leroux–Dunlop–R. Geminiani)

The 1962 Paris–Nice was the 20th edition of the Paris–Nice cycle race and was held from 9 March to 17 March 1962. The race started in Paris and finished in Nice. The race was won by Jef Planckaert of the Flandria team.

== General classification ==
Final general classification

Rank	Rider	Team	Time
1	Jef Planckaert (BEL)	Flandria–Faema–Clément	39h 04' 45"
2	Tom Simpson (GBR)	Gitane–Leroux–Dunlop–R. Geminiani	+ 2' 57"
3	Rolf Wolfshohl (FRG)	Gitane–Leroux–Dunlop–R. Geminiani	+ 5' 58"
4	Armand Desmet (BEL)	Flandria–Faema–Clément	+ 6' 23"
5	Bas Maliepaard (NED)	Gitane–Leroux–Dunlop–R. Geminiani	+ 8' 47"
6	Rik Van Looy (BEL)	Flandria–Faema–Clément	+ 9' 00"
7	Raymond Poulidor (FRA)	Mercier–BP–Hutchinson	+ 9' 15"
8	Henry Anglade (FRA)	Liberia–Grammont–Wolber	+ 11' 13"
9	Jean Gainche (FRA)	Mercier–BP–Hutchinson	+ 11' 32"
10	Georges Groussard (FRA)	Pelforth–Sauvage–Lejeune	+ 13' 33"
