= 1963 La Flèche Wallonne =

Race details
- Dates: 6 May 1963
- Stages: 1
- Distance: 213 km (132 mi)
- Winning time: 6h 08' 39"

Results
	Winner	Raymond Poulidor (FRA)	(Mercier–BP–Hutchinson)
	Second	Jan Janssen (NED)	(Pelforth–Sauvage–Lejeune)
	Third	Peter Post (NED)	(Dr. Mann–Labo)

The 1963 La Flèche Wallonne was the 27th edition of La Flèche Wallonne cycle race and was held on 6 May 1963. The race started in Liège and finished in Charleroi. The race was won by Raymond Poulidor of the Mercier team.

== General classification ==
Final general classification

Rank	Rider	Team	Time
1	Raymond Poulidor (FRA)	Mercier–BP–Hutchinson	6h 08' 39"
2	Jan Janssen (NED)	Pelforth–Sauvage–Lejeune	+ 11"
3	Peter Post (NED)	Dr. Mann–Labo	+ 11"
4	Georges Van Coningsloo (BEL)	Solo–Terrot	+ 11"
5	Willy Bocklant (BEL)	Flandria–Faema	+ 13"
6	Pino Cerami (BEL)	Peugeot–BP–Englebert	+ 13"
7	Clément Roman (BEL)	Flandria–Faema	+ 13"
8	Armand Desmet (BEL)	Flandria–Faema	+ 13"
9	Willy Vanden Berghen (BEL)	Mercier–BP–Hutchinson	+ 18"
10	Tom Simpson (GBR)	Peugeot–BP–Englebert	+ 32"
