= Rapha–Gitane–Dunlop =

French professional cycling team

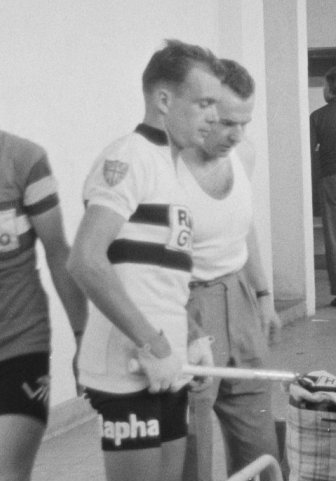
- Brian Robinson at the 1960 Tour de France

Team information
- Registered: France
- Founded: 1959
- Disbanded: 1961
- Discipline: Road
- Bicycles: R. Géminiani (1959); Gitane (1960-1961)

Key personnel
- General manager: Raymond Louviot (1961)

Team name history
- 1959 1960–1961: Rapha–R. Geminiani–Dunlop; Rapha–Gitane–Dunlop

Rapha–Gitane–Dunlop was a French professional cycling team that existed from 1959 to 1961. It was created as a sister team of the Saint-Raphaël–R. Geminiani–Dunlop.

The Rapha premium cycling brand has taken its name from the Rapha team.

== Major results ==
1960
Mazé Cyclo-cross, Rolf Wolfshohl
Germany Cyclo-cross National Championships, Rolf Wolfshohl
UCI Cyclo-cross World Championships, Rolf Wolfshohl
Paris Cyclo-cross, Rolf Wolfshohl
Vincennes Cyclo-cross, Rolf Wolfshohl
Köln Cyclo-cross, Rolf Wolfshohl
Paris–Brussels, Pierre Everaert
Overall Deutschland Tour, Ab Geldermans

Stage 2, Ab Geldermans
Stage 3, Pierre Everaert
Stage 7, Rudi Altig

Stage 4 Tour de Champagne, Gilbert Scodeller
Liège–Bastogne–Liège, Ab Geldermans
Stages 1 & 6 Tour du Maroc, Alves Barbosa
Stage 2 Tour du Maroc, Antonino Baptista
Stage 3b Quatre Jours de Dunkerque, Roger Rivière
Overall Tour de l'Aude, Gérard Thiélin

Stage 2, Brian Robinson

Overall Tour du Sud-Est, Tom Simpson
Stage 3 GP du Midi-Libre, Brian Robinson
Stage 5b Critérium du Dauphiné, Roger Rivière
Stage 7b Critérium du Dauphiné, Raymond Mastrotto
Stage 1b (TTT) Driedaagse van Antwerpen, Rolf Wolfshohl, Tom Simpson & Ab Geldermans
Stages 1b, 6 & 10 Tour de France, Roger Rivière
Hoepertingen Criterium, Jo de Haan
Overall Grande Prémio Vilar, Alves Barbosa

Stages 3a, 4a, 4b, 5, 7, 8b, 9a & 9b, Alves Barbosa

Zandvoort Criterium, Jo de Haan
Lommel, Jo de Haan
Nantua Criterium, Rudi Altig
Bussières Criterium: Raymond Elena
Paris–Tours, Jo de Haan
Middelkerke Cyclo-cross, Rolf Wolfshohl
Battel Cyclo-cross, Rolf Wolfshohl

1961
Mazé Cyclo-cross, Rolf Wolfshohl
Germany Cyclo-cross National Championships, Rolf Wolfshohl
UCI Cyclo-cross World Championships, Rolf Wolfshohl
Bordeaux–Saintes, Fernand Delort
Tour of Flanders, Tom Simpson
Overall Tour de Tunisie, Jean-Claude Lebaube
Stage 1b Quatre Jours de Dunkerque, Tom Simpson
Overall Critérium du Dauphiné, Brian Robinson

Stage 3, Brian Robinson

Stage 1 Tour de l'Avenir, Jean-Claude Lebaube
Stage 1 Circuit d'Aquitaine, Gérard Thiélin
Harelbeke Cyclo-cross, Rolf Wolfshohl
Middelkerke Cyclo-cross, Rolf Wolfshohl
Giussano Cyclo-cross, Rolf Wolfshohl
