= 1959 Paris–Roubaix =

Cycling race

Race details
- Dates: 12 April 1959
- Stages: 1
- Distance: 262.5 km (163.1 mi)
- Winning time: 6h 08' 20"

Results
	Winner	Noël Foré (BEL)
	Second	Gilbert Desmet (BEL)
	Third	Marcel Janssens (BEL)

The 1959 Paris–Roubaix was the 57th edition of the Paris–Roubaix, a classic one-day cycle race in France. The single day event was held on 12 April 1959 and stretched 262.5 km (163 mi) from Paris to the finish at Roubaix Velodrome. The winner was Noël Foré from Belgium.

== Results ==
Final results (1–10)
Rank	Cyclist	Time
1	Noël Foré (BEL)	6h 08' 20″
2	Gilbert Desmet (BEL)	+0' 00″
3	Marcel Janssens (BEL)	+0' 00″
4	Rik Van Looy (BEL)	+0' 57″
5	Tino Sabbadini (FRA)	+0' 57″
6	Alfred De Bruyne (BEL)	+0' 57″
7	Frans de Mulder (BEL)	+0' 57″
8	Leon van Daele (BEL)	+1' 04″
9	Frans Aerenhouts (BEL)	+1' 04″
10	Raymond Impanis (BEL)	+1' 04″
