= 1961 Paris–Nice =

Race details
- Dates: 10–16 March 1961
- Stages: 7
- Distance: 1,228 km (763.0 mi)
- Winning time: 31h 59' 41"

Results
| Jersey awarded to the overall winner | Winner | Jacques Anquetil (FRA) | (Helyett–Fynsec–Hutchinson) |
| | Second | Joseph Groussard (FRA) | (Alcyon–Leroux) |
| | Third | Jef Planckaert (BEL) | (Wiel's–Flandria) |

The 1961 Paris–Nice was the 19th edition of the Paris–Nice cycle race and was held from 10 March to 16 March 1961. The race started in Paris and finished in Nice. The race was won by Jacques Anquetil of the Helyett team.

== General classification ==
Final general classification

| Rank | Rider | Team | Time |
|---|---|---|---|
| 1 | Jacques Anquetil (FRA) | Helyett–Fynsec–Hutchinson | 31h 59' 41" |
| 2 | Joseph Groussard (FRA) | Alcyon–Leroux | + 1' 59" |
| 3 | Jef Planckaert (BEL) | Wiel's–Flandria | + 2' 00" |
| 4 | Jean-Claude Lefebvre (FRA) | Alcyon–Leroux | + 2' 07" |
| 5 | Tom Simpson (GBR) | Rapha–Gitane–Dunlop | + 2' 10" |
| 6 | Albertus Geldermans (NED) | Saint-Raphaël–R. Geminiani–Dunlop | + 2' 26" |
| 7 | Rik Van Looy (BEL) | Faema | + 2' 29" |
| 8 | Armand Desmet (BEL) | Faema | + 3' 40" |
| 9 | Raymond Poulidor (FRA) | Mercier–BP–Hutchinson | + 4' 50" |
| 10 | Édouard Delberghe (FRA) | Helyett–Fynsec–Hutchinson | + 5' 14" |
