= 1963 Giro di Lombardia =

Race details
- Dates: 19 October 1963
- Stages: 1
- Distance: 263 km (163.4 mi)
- Winning time: 7h 05' 30"

Results
| | Winner | Jo de Roo (NED) | (Saint-Raphaël–Gitane–R. Geminiani) |
| | Second | Adriano Durante (ITA) | (Legnano) |
| | Third | Michele Dancelli (ITA) | (Molteni) |

The 1963 Giro di Lombardia was the 57th edition of the Giro di Lombardia cycle race and was held on 19 October 1963. The race started in Milan and finished in Como. The race was won by Jo de Roo of the Saint-Raphaël team.

== General classification ==
Final general classification

| Rank | Rider | Team | Time |
|---|---|---|---|
| 1 | Jo de Roo (NED) | Saint-Raphaël–Gitane–R. Geminiani | 7h 05' 30" |
| 2 | Adriano Durante (ITA) | Legnano | + 0" |
| 3 | Michele Dancelli (ITA) | Molteni | + 0" |
| 4 | Willy Bocklant (BEL) | Flandria–Faema | + 0" |
| 5 | Italo Zilioli (ITA) | Carpano | + 0" |
| 6 | Angelo Conterno (ITA) | Carpano | + 0" |
| 7 | Guido De Rosso (ITA) | Molteni | + 0" |
| 8 | Aldo Moser (ITA) | San Pellegrino–Firte | + 0" |
| 9 | Luigi Maserati (ITA) | Gazzola | + 0" |
| 10 | Tom Simpson (GBR) | Peugeot–BP–Englebert | + 1' 49" |
