= 1965 Giro di Lombardia =

Race details
- Dates: 16 October 1965
- Stages: 1
- Distance: 266 km (165 mi)
- Winning time: 6h 47' 00"

Results
| | Winner | Tom Simpson (GBR) | (Peugeot-Michelin BP) |
| | Second | Gerben Karstens (NED) | (Carpano) |
| | Third | Jean Stablinski (FRA) | (Ford France-Gitane-Dunlop) |

The 1965 Giro di Lombardia cycling race took place on 16 October 1965, and was won by Peugeot-Michelin BP's Tom Simpson, becoming the first British winner. It was the 59th edition of the Giro di Lombardia "monument" classic race.

== Results ==
| | Cyclist | Team | Time |
|---|---|---|---|
| 1 | Tom Simpson (GBR) | Peugeot-Michelin BP | 6h 47' 00" |
| 2 | Gerben Karstens (NED) | Televizier | +3' 11" |
| 3 | Jean Stablinski (FRA) | Ford France-Gitane-Dunlop | s.t. |
| 4 | Franco Bitossi (ITA) | Filotex | s.t. |
| 5 | Gianni Motta (ITA) | Molteni | s.t. |
| 6 | Raymond Poulidor (FRA) | Mercier- Hutchinson-BP | s.t. |
| 7 | Michele Dancelli (ITA) | Molteni | s.t. |
| 8 | Jacques Anquetil (FRA) | Ford France-Gitane-Lejeune | s.t. |
| 9 | Guido Marcello Mugnaini (ITA) | Maino | s.t. |
| 10 | Willy Monty (BEL) | Pelforth-Sauvage-Lejeune | s.t. |
