= 1962 Milan–San Remo =

Race details
- Dates: 19 March 1962
- Stages: 1
- Distance: 288 km (179 mi)
- Winning time: 6h 48' 06"

Results
	Winner	Emile Daems (BEL)
	Second	Yvo Molenaers (BEL)
	Third	Louis Proost (BEL)

The 1962 Milan–San Remo was the 53rd edition of the Milan–San Remo cycle race and was held on 19 March 1962. The race started in Milan and finished in San Remo. The race was won by Emile Daems.

== General classification ==
Final general classification

Rank	Rider	Time
1	Emile Daems (BEL)	6h 48' 06"
2	Yvo Molenaers (BEL)	+ 1' 15"
3	Louis Proost (BEL)	+ 1' 19"
4	Willy Schroeders (BEL)	+ 1' 19"
5	Diego Ronchini (ITA)	+ 1' 19"
6	Carlo Brugnami (ITA)	+ 1' 19"
7	Guido Carlesi (ITA)	+ 1' 35"
8	Robert Seneca (BEL)	+ 1' 35"
9	Bruno Mealli (ITA)	+ 1' 35"
10	Antonio Bailetti (ITA)	+ 1' 35"
