= 1963 Paris–Roubaix =

Race details
- Dates: 7 April 1963
- Stages: 1
- Distance: 266 km (165.3 mi)
- Winning time: 7h 03' 33"

Results
	Winner	Emile Daems (BEL)	(Peugeot–BP–Englebert)
	Second	Rik Van Looy (BEL)	(G.B.C.–Libertas)
	Third	Jan Janssen (NED)	(Pelforth–Sauvage–Lejeune)

The 1963 Paris–Roubaix was the 61st edition of the Paris–Roubaix cycle race and was held on 7 April 1963. The race started in Compiègne and finished in Roubaix. The race was won by Emile Daems of the Peugeot team.

== General classification ==
Final general classification

Rank	Rider	Team	Time
1	Emile Daems (BEL)	Peugeot–BP–Englebert	7h 03' 33"
2	Rik Van Looy (BEL)	G.B.C.–Libertas	+ 0"
3	Jan Janssen (NED)	Pelforth–Sauvage–Lejeune	+ 0"
4	Marcel Janssens (BEL)	Flandria–Faema	+ 0"
5	Armand Desmet (BEL)	Flandria–Faema	+ 0"
6	Raymond Poulidor (FRA)	Mercier–BP–Hutchinson	+ 0"
7	Peter Post (NED)	Dr. Mann–Labo	+ 0"
8	Tom Simpson (GBR)	Peugeot–BP–Englebert	+ 0"
9	Arthur Decabooter (BEL)	Solo–Terrot	+ 0"
10	Jef Planckaert (BEL)	Flandria–Faema	+ 0"
