= 1963 Milan–San Remo =

Race details
- Dates: 19 March 1963
- Stages: 1
- Distance: 288 km (179 mi)
- Winning time: 6h 59' 38"

Results
	Winner	Joseph Groussard (FRA)
	Second	Rolf Wolfshohl (FRG)
	Third	Willy Schroeders (BEL)

The 1963 Milan–San Remo was the 54th edition of the Milan–San Remo cycle race and was held on 19 March 1963. The race started in Milan and finished in San Remo. The race was won by Joseph Groussard.

== General classification ==
Final general classification

Rank	Rider	Time
1	Joseph Groussard (FRA)	6h 59' 38"
2	Rolf Wolfshohl (FRG)	+ 0"
3	Willy Schroeders (BEL)	+ 28"
4	Willy Bocklant (BEL)	+ 53"
5	Vittorio Adorni (ITA)	+ 53"
6	Luis Otaño (ESP)	+ 2' 07"
7	Franco Balmamion (ITA)	+ 2' 32"
8	Jean Graczyk (FRA)	+ 2' 52"
9	Gilbert Desmet (BEL)	+ 2' 52"
10	Vin Denson (GBR)	+ 2' 52"
