= 1961 Tour of Flanders =

Race details
- Dates: March 26, 1961
- Stages: 1
- Distance: 255 km (158.4 mi)
- Winning time: 6h 22' 00"

Results
	Winner	Tom Simpson (GBR)	(Rapha-Gitane-Dunlop)
	Second	Nino Defilippis (ITA)	(Carpano)
	Third	Jo de Haan (NED)	(Rapha-Gitane-Dunlop)

The 1961 Tour of Flanders cycling race took place on March 26, 1961, and was won by Rapha-Gitane-Dunlop's Tom Simpson, becoming the first British winner. It was the 45th edition of the Tour of Flanders "monument" classic race.

== Route ==
The race started in Ghent and finished in Wetteren for the last time – after 17 years. The total distance was 255 km. There were six categorized climbs:

- Kwaremont
- Kruisberg
- Edelareberg
- Valkenberg
- Kasteelstraat
- Grotenberge

== Results ==
	Cyclist	Team	Time
1	Tom Simpson (GBR)	Rapha-Gitane-Dunlop	6h 22' 00"
2	Nino Defilippis (ITA)	Carpano	s.t.
3	Jo de Haan (NED)	Rapha-Gitane-Dunlop	+11"
4	Emile Daems (BEL)	Philco	+34"
5	Mies Stolker (NED)	Helyett-Fynsec-Hutchinson	+56"
6	Camille Le Menn (FRA)	Peugeot-BP-Dunlop	+59"
7	Jean Graczyk (FRA)	Helyett-Fynsec-Hutchinson	+1' 00"
8	Arthur Decabooter (BEL)	Carpano	s.t.
9	Martin Van Geneugden (BEL)	Torpedo	s.t.
10	Frans Schoubben (BEL)	Peugeot-BP-Dunlop	s.t.
