= 1963 Tour of Flanders =

47th Tour of Flanders
Race details
- Dates: 31 March 1963
- Stages: 1
- Distance: 249 km (154.7 mi)
- Winning time: 6h 08'

Results
| | Winner | Noël Foré (BEL) | (Flandria–Faema) |
| | Second | Frans Melckenbeeck (BEL) | (Mercier–Hutchinson) |
| | Third | Tom Simpson (GBR) | (Peugeot–BP–Englebert) |

The 47th Tour of Flanders cycling classic was held on Sunday, 31 March 1963. It was won by Belgian Noël Foré in a three-man sprint with Frans Melckenbeeck and Tom Simpson. Foré set a new record speed average of 40.683 km/h (25.279 mph). 35 of 127 riders finished.

== Route ==
The race started in Ghent and finished in Gentbrugge – covering 249 km (155 mi). There were six categorized climbs:

- Kwaremont
- Kruisberg
- Edelareberg
- Valkenberg
- Kasteelstraat
- Grotenberge

== Results ==
Result
| Rank | Rider | Team | Time |
|---|---|---|---|
| 1 | Noël Foré (BEL) | Flandria–Faema | 6h 08' 00" |
| 2 | Frans Melckenbeeck (BEL) | Mercier–Hutchinson | s.t. |
| 3 | Tom Simpson (GBR) | Peugeot–BP–Englebert | s.t. |
| 4 | Willy Vannitsen (BEL) | Peugeot–BP–Englebert | + 36" |
| 5 | Jos Wouters (BEL) | Solo–Terrot | s.t. |
| 6 | Rik Van Looy (BEL) | GBC–Libertas | s.t. |
| 7 | Michel Van Aerde (BEL) | Solo–Terrot | s.t. |
| 8 | Emile Daems (BEL) | Peugeot–BP–Englebert | s.t. |
| 9 | Raymond Poulidor (FRA) | Mercier–Hutchinson | s.t. |
| 10 | Jo de Roo (NED) | Saint-Raphael–Gitane–Hutchinson | s.t. |
