= Piet Rentmeester =

Dutch racing cyclist

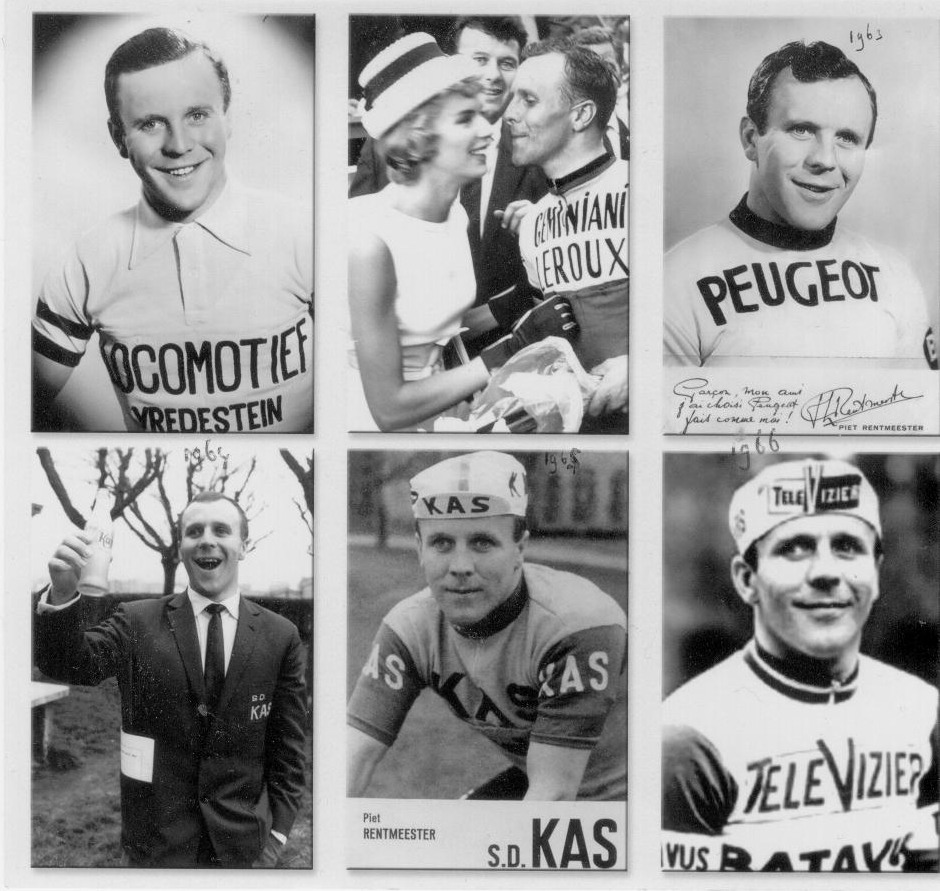

Personal information
- Born: 27 August 1938 Yerseke, Netherlands
- Died: 11 February 2017 (aged 78) Goes, Netherlands

Cycling career
- Sport: Cycling
- Role: Rider

Piet Rentmeester (27 August 1938 – 11 February 2017) was a Dutch professional racing cyclist. He won the Kuurne–Brussels–Kuurne race in 1962.

== Career ==
Rentmeester’s greatest victory was the classic race Kuurne–Brussels–Kuurne in 1962. In the same year, he also won Paris–Camembert. He participated once in a Grand Tour, riding the Vuelta a España in 1964, but did not finish the race. At the UCI Road World Championships, he placed eleventh in both 1961 and 1962. Rentmeester came to public attention in 1965 after a doping test reportedly showed that he had submitted a urine sample belonging to his wife. He was mockingly nicknamed “the pregnant cyclist” for years afterward. He denied the allegation, stating that it never resulted in a formal accusation by the national cycling federation. According to Rentmeester, the story had been spread by an unknown freelance journalist. After retiring from professional cycling, Rentmeester ran a wholesale business in cycling equipment. He sold the company to Manfred Krikke in 1980. Rentmeester died in 2017 at the age of 78.
