= Carmine Preziosi =

Italian cyclist

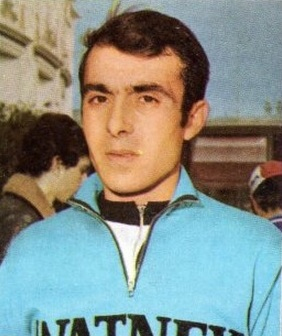

Personal information
- Full name: Carmine Preziosi
- Born: 8 July 1943 (age 83) Sant'Angelo all'Esca, Italy

Cycling career
- Sport: Cycling
- Discipline: Road
- Role: Rider

Professional teams
- 1963–1965: Pelforth-Sauvage-Lejeune
- 1966: Bianchi-Mobylette
- 1967: Molteni
- 1968: Frimatic-Viva-De Gribaldy
- 1969: Goldor-Hertekamp-Gerka
- 1970: Mann-Grundig
- 1971–1972: Watneys-Avia

Major wins
- Liège–Bastogne–Liège (1965)

Carmine Preziosi (born 8 July 1943) is an Italian former professional road bicycle racer.

== Palmarès ==
1962
1st, Overall, Triptyque Ardennais

2nd, Stage 2a
1st, Stage 2b

1963
1st, Brussel-Opwijk
1st, Grand Prix Bodson
3rd, Omloop der Vlaamse Gewesten, Amateurs
3rd, Oostakker
1st, Zellik
1st, Puteaux

1964
2nd, Beringen
2nd, Brussel-Verviers
2nd, Stage 8, Critérium du Dauphiné Libéré
3rd, Kruishoutem
2nd, Mandel-Leie-Schelde
3rd, Stage 1, Tour de Luxembourg
1st, Ferrière-la-Grande
2nd, Giro di Lombardia

1965
1st, Brussel-Verviers
3rd, Brussel–Ingooigem
2nd, Stage 7a, Critérium du Dauphiné Libéré
2nd, GP Monaco
1st, Genoa–Nice
1st, Liège–Bastogne–Liège
1st, Hasselt

1966
2nd, GP de Cannes
1st, Giro dell'Emilia

1967
1st, Brussel-Verviers
2nd, Grand Prix Pino Cerami
3rd, Hannut
2nd, Overall, Tirreno–Adriatico
1st, Overall, Tour of Belgium

3rd, Stage 1
1st, Stage 2a

1st, Denderwindeke

1968
1st, GP de Fréjus
