= Willy Bocklant =

Belgian cyclist (1941–1985)

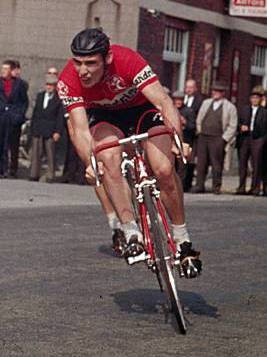
- Bocklant in 1967

Personal information
- Full name: Willy Bocklant
- Born: 26 January 1941 Bellegem, Belgium
- Died: 6 June 1985 (aged 44) Mouscron, Belgium

Cycling career
- Sport: Cycling
- Discipline: Road
- Role: Rider

Professional teams
- 1962: Gritzner-Veith
- 1963–1965: Flandria
- 1966: Mann-Grundig
- 1967: Flandria
- 1968–1969: Pull Over Centrale-Tasmanie

Major wins
- Liège–Bastogne–Liège (1964); Tour de Romandie (1963)

Willy Bocklant (26 January 1941 – 6 June 1985) was a Belgian professional road racing cyclist active as a professional between 1962 and 1969. Among his biggest victories are the 1964 edition of Liège–Bastogne–Liège and the overall classification of the Tour de Romandie in 1963. Bocklant was born in Bellegem and died in Mouscron.

== Palmarès ==
Date	Placing	Event	Competition	Location	Country
1960	1	Overall	Circuit Franco-Belge	Roubaix	Belgium
1960	1	Stage 1	Triptyque Ardennaise	Rotheux	Belgium
1960	1	Stage 3	Triptyque Ardennaise	Pepinster	Belgium
1960	1	Overall	Triptyque Ardennaise	Pepinster	Belgium
1961	1		GP Stan Ockers		France
1963	1		GP Stan Ockers		France
1963	1		Stadsprijs Geraardsbergen		Belgium
1963	1	Overall	Tour de Romandie		Switzerland
1964	1		Giro del Piemonte		Italy
1964	1		Weekend Ardennais		Belgium
1964	1		Antwerp–Ougrée		Belgium
1964	1		Liège–Bastogne–Liège	Liège	Belgium
1964	1		GP de la Basse-Sambre	Auvelais	Belgium
1965	1		Circuit des régions frontalières Mouscron		Belgium
1965	1		Grand Prix d'Isbergues		France
1965	1	Stage 3	Tour du Nord	Anzin	France
1965	1	Stage 2	Paris–Nice	Château-Chinon	France
1965	1		Brabantse Pijl		Belgium
1965	1	Stage 2	Tour de Romandie	Bassecourt	Switzerland
1965	1		Brussels–Ingooigem	Ingooigem	Belgium
1967	1		E3 Prijs Vlaanderen	Harelbeke	Belgium
1968	1	Stage 5	Tour du Nord	Roubaix	France
