= 1961 Tour de Romandie =

Race details
- Dates: 11–14 May 1961
- Stages: 4
- Distance: 771 km (479 mi)
- Winning time: 20h 41' 56"

Results
	Winner	Louis Rostollan (FRA)
	Second	Giuseppe Fezzardi (ITA)
	Third	Imerio Massignan (ITA)

The 1961 Tour de Romandie was the 15th edition of the Tour de Romandie cycle race and was held from 11 to 14 May 1961. The race started in Geneva and finished in Lausanne. The race was won by Louis Rostollan.

== General classification ==
Final general classification
Rank	Rider	Time
1	Louis Rostollan (FRA)	20h 41' 56"
2	Giuseppe Fezzardi (ITA)	+ 1' 31"
3	Imerio Massignan (ITA)	+ 2' 28"
4	Charly Gaul (LUX)	+ 3' 12"
5	Wilfried Thaler (AUT)	+ 5' 12"
6	Alfred Rüegg (SUI)	+ 6' 17"
7	Hans Junkermann (FRG)	+ 6' 29"
8	Stéphane Lach (FRA)	+ 8' 26"
9	Graziano Battistini (ITA)	+ 9' 26"
10	Jacques Anquetil (FRA)	+ 9' 42"
