= Jacques Anquetil =

French cyclist (1934–1987)

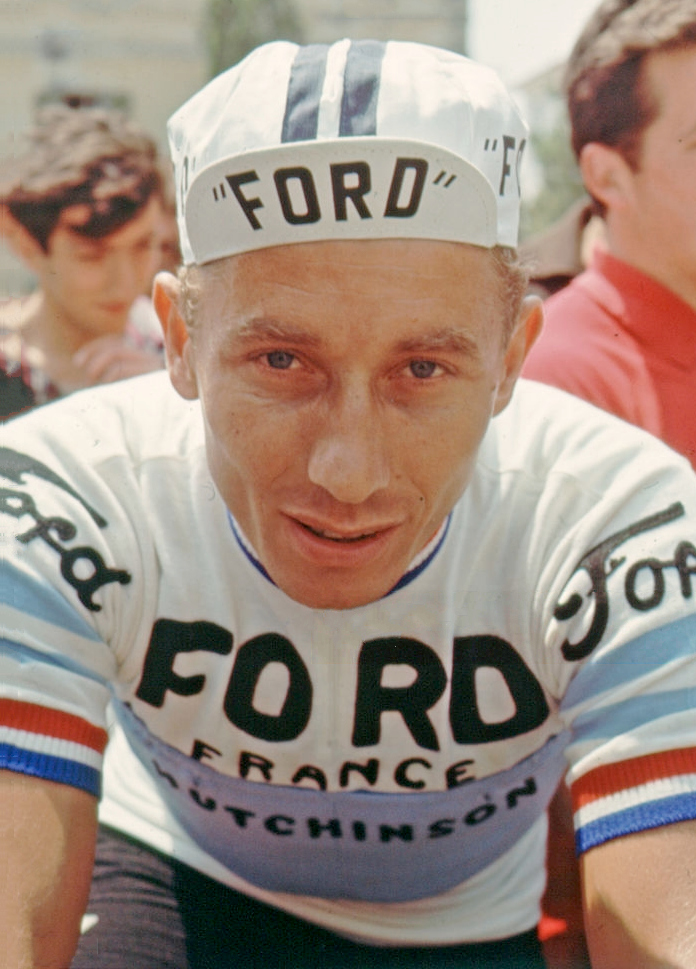
- Anquetil at the 1966 Giro d'Italia

Personal information
- Full name: Jacques Anquetil
- Nicknames: Monsieur Chrono; Maître Jacques
- Born: 8 January 1934 Mont-Saint-Aignan, France
- Died: 18 November 1987 (aged 53) Rouen, France
- Height: 1.76 m (5 ft 9 1/2 in)
- Weight: 70 kg (154 lb; 11 st 0 lb)

Cycling career
- Sport: Cycling
- Disciplines: Road and track
- Role: Rider
- Rider type: Time trialist All-rounder

Amateur team
- 1950–1952: AC Sottevillais

Professional teams
- 1953–1955: La Perle
- 1956–1961: Helyett–Potin–Hutchinson
- 1962–1964: Saint-Raphaël–R. Geminiani–Dunlop
- 1965–1966: Ford France–Gitane
- 1967–1969: Bic–Hutchinson

Major wins
- Grand Tours Tour de France General classification (1957, 1961, 1962, 1963, 1964) 16 individual stages (1957, 1961, 1962, 1963, 1964) 1 TTT stage (1957) Giro d'Italia General classification (1960, 1964) 6 individual stages (1959, 1960, 1961, 1964) Vuelta a España General classification (1963) 1 individual stage (1963) Stage races Paris–Nice (1957, 1961, 1963, 1965, 1966) Critérium du Dauphiné Libéré (1963, 1965) Volta a Catalunya (1967) Tour of the Basque Country (1969) One-day races and Classics Liège–Bastogne–Liège (1966) Gent–Wevelgem (1964) Other Hour record (1956) Super Prestige Pernod International (1961, 1963, 1965, 1966)
Medal record
Representing France
Men's road bicycle racing
Olympic Games
Bronze medal – third place	1952 Helsinki	Team time trial
World Championships
Silver medal – second place	1966 Nürburgring	Road race
Men's track bicycle racing
World Championships
Silver medal – second place	1956 Copenhagen	Individual Pursuit

Jacques Anquetil (pronounced [ʒak ɑ̃k.til]; 8 January 1934 – 18 November 1987) was a French road racing cyclist and the first cyclist to win the Tour de France five times, in 1957 and from 1961 to 1964.

He stated before the 1961 Tour that he would gain the yellow jersey on day one and wear it all through the tour, a tall order with two previous winners in the field—Charly Gaul and Federico Bahamontes—but he did it. (Note: Anquetil took the yellow jersey after the second half-stage (time trial) of the first day, Darrigade having won the first half-stage.) His victories in stage races such as the Tour were built on an exceptional ability to ride alone against the clock in individual time trial stages, which lent him the name "Monsieur Chrono".

He won eight Grand Tours in his career, which was a record when he retired and was surpassed only by Eddy Merckx and Bernard Hinault.

== Early life ==
Anquetil was born on 8 January 1934 in a clinic in Mont-Saint-Aignan, a suburb of Rouen in Normandy situated next to Bois-Guillaume, where his parents had a house at the time. His father Ernest was the grandson of a Prussian soldier called Ernst, who died in the Franco-Prussian War after having an affair with Melanie Grouh, Ernest's grandmother. Melanie later married Frédéric Anquetil, who adopted her son Ernest Victor, Jacques' grandfather, who would later die in World War I, leaving Jacques' father Ernest as the head of the family at the age of 11. On 25 May 1929, Ernest married Jacques' mother Marie, who had been orphaned since the age of 2 and been raised by nuns in an orphanage. Jacques had a younger brother, Philippe.

Anquetil received his first bike from his father at the age of 4. When Jacques was seven, his father Ernest returned from his service in World War II and, unable to find building work except for the German occupying forces, moved with the family to Le Bourguet close to Quincampoix to become a strawberry farmer. It was here that the young Anquetil attended school, receiving good grades, particularly in mathematics. Ernest Anquetil often became violent after excess alcohol consumption, and Jacques' mother eventually moved into an apartment in Paris, leaving her sons with their father. As his second bike grew too small for him, Anquetil needed a new one at the age of 11. With his father being unable to afford it, Jacques argued successfully to allow him to replace one of the workers on the strawberry fields, earning him the necessary money to buy a Stella bicycle on his own. At the age of 14, he began to attend Technical College in Rouen's southern district of Sotteville to become a metalworker. It was here that he met and befriended Maurice Dieulois, who rode amateur bike races on the weekends and whose father had been president of the local cycling club AC Sottevillais. Through him, Anquetil got into bicycle racing, signing up to the club under the tutelage of André Boucher late in the summer of 1950. Since it was too late to participate in any more races that year, he instead focused on getting into shape for the coming season. Boucher recognized Anquetil's talent and offered him two bikes, one for training and one for races, as well as free supply of tyres, bike maintenance and a performance bonus. At the end of 1950, Anquetil gained his diploma and by the end of January 1951 had taken a job in a workshop in Sotteville, for a meager pay of 64 francs an hour. Since his employer would not allow him Thursday evening off, which the club used for training rides, he quit his position at the beginning of March, moving back to working on his father's farm while pursuing a career in cycling.

== Amateur career ==
Anquetil's first race as an amateur was in Le Havre on 8 April 1951. While Dieulois won, Anquetil finished in the field. He took his first victory in his fourth race, the Grand Prix Maurice Latour on 3 May of the same year. Over the remaining course of the season, he won a total of eight races, including winning the Normandy team time trial championships with his teammates in July. Ending the season was his first ever individual time trial, which was also the last race of the season-long maillot des jeunes competition for local amateur riders. Setting off last as the leader of the competition, four minutes after Dieulois, Anquetil showed reluctance to catch and overtake his friend, but eventually did so, winning both the race and the competition as a whole.

For his second amateur season in 1952, Anquetil moved up from the junior into the senior ranks. The year produced another eleven victories and five more top-three placings. During the regional championship race for Normandy, he was marked the entire race by rival riders from the powerful cycling club from Caen. 120 km (75 mi) from the finish, frustrated by his opponents' tactics, Anquetil was ready to retire, but Boucher urged him on. Anquetil then pretended by untie his toe-straps, falling back in the group, causing his opponents to assume he would retire. He then attacked from the back of the group, left the competition behind, bridged a five-minute gap to the leading group and won. He was also victorious in the Grand Prix de France time trial, winning the event by a significant 12-minute margin. His first ever appearance at a national race came at the qualification event for the Olympic Games, he came third. Shortly after, he won the French amateur championships in Carcassonne, securing a call-up for the French squad at the Helsinki Olympic Games later in the year. On 3 August, he lined up for road race at the 1952 Summer Olympics, but was disappointed to only finish twelfth. He fared better in the team race, taking the bronze medal alongside Alfred Tonello and Claude Rouer. Next, he competed in the amateur road race at the 1952 UCI Road World Championships in Luxembourg, which also featured future stars such as Charly Gaul and Rik van Looy. The course, being run over a flat terrain, did not suit Anquetil, and he finished in the bunch, being ranked in equal eighth place with all finishers in his group.

For his final season as an amateur, Anquetil took a licence as an "independent", a category between amateur and professional, which was abolished in 1966. This allowed him to enter races with young professionals to further test himself. After winning the independent championship of Normandy, his first race against professional competition came in August at the three-stage Tour de la Manche. On the first stage, he finished second, 24 seconds behind future World Champion Jean Stablinski. In the following day's 38.6 km (24.0 mi) time trial, Anquetil won by almost 2 minutes, taking the lead of the race. On the final stage to Cherbourg, the riders on the rival teams tried to dislodge him, going so far as to force him into crashing into a ditch. Anquetil was then helped by another independent rider, Maurice Pelé, who disapproved of the others' tactics and assisted Anquetil in getting back into the group. Anquetil went on to finish safely in the peloton and won the race overall. In the amateur category, Anquetil was leading the season-long maillot des As competition run by the newspaper Paris–Normandy. The last race of the competition was a 122 km (76 mi) time trial on 23 August 1953. Anquetil won the event by a margin of nine minutes over second-placed Claude Le Ber at an average speed of 42.05 km/h (26.13 mph), a speed unheard of from an amateur rider. This led journalist Alex Virot from Radio Luxembourg to joke that "In Normandy there can only be 900 metres in a kilometre!". Following this exploit, Anquetil was invited to race in the Circuit de l'Aulne, the most prestigious criterium race in France, which that year included Tour de France winner Louison Bobet. Anquetil finished in the leading group but during the final sprint was held by the jersey by another, unknown rider, preventing him from victory, which went to Bobet.

== Professional career ==
=== 1953: Grand Prix des Nations ===
After his success at the Tour de la Manche, Anquetil was approached by several professional teams. Francis Pélissier, a former professional and sporting director of the La Perle team, offered him a contract in order to race in the Grand Prix des Nations in September. It was back then considered the most prestigious time trial event in the world, often described as the "unofficial world championship" for time trialists. Anquetil, still a minor, needed consent from his parents to sign the contract, which initially ran for two months from September to October 1953. He was paid 30,000 francs per month. The contract with La Perle briefly led to conflict between Anquetil and his coach Boucher, who threatened legal action. The two made up however in time for Boucher to help Anquetil prepare for the race.

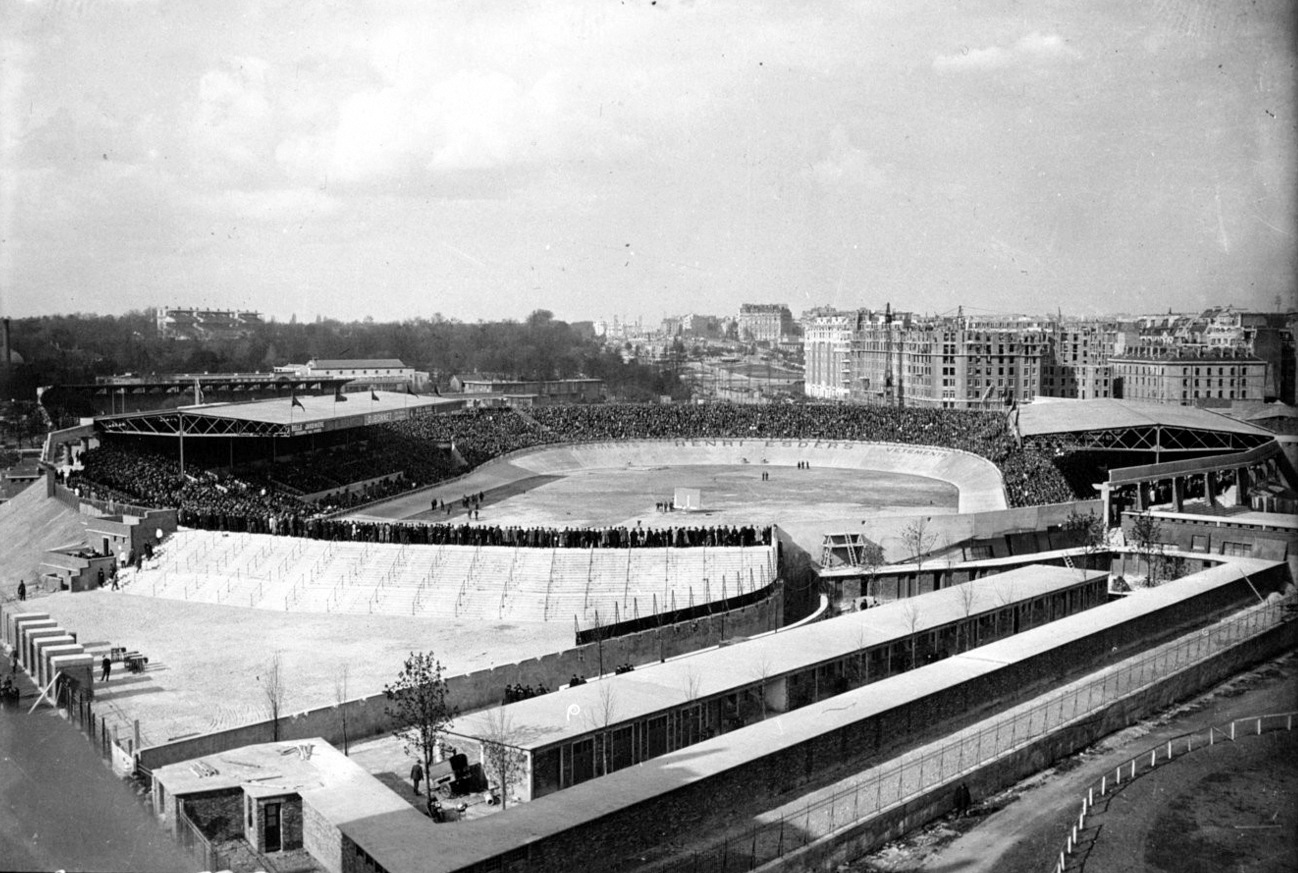
The old Parc des Princes in Paris, which in Anquetil's time served as the finish of the Grand Prix des Nations, a time trial race which Anquetil won a record nine times.

The Grand Prix des Nations took place on 27 September over a 140 km (87 mi) distance from Versailles to the Parc des Princes in Paris. Anquetil prepared meticulously, sending himself postcards from different places along the route describing the course. On race day, he started strongly, even though he was held back by a puncture and a bike swap within the first couple of kilometres. He eventually won the time trial by a margin of almost seven minutes ahead of Roger Creton. Even though still just 19 years of age, he came within 35 seconds of beating the track record set by Hugo Koblet two years earlier. The victory made Anquetil an instant sensation in the sports press, with the Tour de France director Jacques Goddet writing an article in L'Equipe titled: "When the Child Champion was Born."

Anquetil followed up his victory three weeks later with another in the Grand Prix de Lugano in Switzerland. Anquetil was then invited to ride the prestigious Trofeo Baracchi, a two-man time trial in Italy. On his way there, Anquetil visited his idol Fausto Coppi, still considered the best cyclist of the era at the time. They both competed in the Trofeo Baracchi, with Coppi winning alongside Riccardo Filippi. Anquetil and his partner, experienced rider Antonin Rolland, finished second. Rolland commented after the finish: "I was well prepared and in very good form. Nevertheless, Jacques assassinated me and for the last 30 kilometres I could not go through; I was clinging on by the skin of my teeth."

=== 1954–1956: military service and Hour Record ===
The first big challenge in Anquetil's first full season as a professional was the week-long early-season stage race Paris–Nice. (Note: Run that year as Paris–Côte d'Azur.) Albeit still only 20 years old, he managed to win the time trial stage and finished seventh overall. Strong results, although without victories, still secured him a spot on the French team for the World Championships held in Solingen. 45 km (28 mi) from the finish, Anquetil was part of an elite group at the front of the race, containing Bobet, Coppi, and Gaul. While Anquetil dropped back soon after, Bobet won the world title, but Anquetil finished a credible fifth, ahead of Coppi. All throughout the season, tensions grew between Anquetil and Pélissier, who felt that his young prodigy did not show enough discipline in terms of diet and constraint with alcohol. When Pélissier decided to follow Hugo Koblet during this year's running of the Grand Prix des Nations, Anquetil was enraged by this perceived loss of trust. Come race day, he beat Koblet comprehensively. At the finish, Anquetil ignored Pélissier and then drove to Pélissier's café outside of Paris and delivered the winner's bouquet to his director's wife.

Following an eleventh-place finish at Paris–Tours, Anquetil had to enroll for compulsory military service, which at the time in France lasted 30 months. He was transferred to the sportsman's battalion at Joinville and was given great leeway to train and continue his cycling career in the following years. At the Trofeo Baracchi, Anquetil this time partnered Bobet, but having had only three hours of sleep prior to the race and arriving late in Italy, the pair finished second, again to Coppi and Filippi.

The 1955 season would be the last for the La Perle team, as funds were running low. In the spring, Anquetil finished 14th at Paris–Roubaix after breaking a chain during the race, while he was forced to abandon the Critérium National after a crash. He gathered more experience when he placed 15th at the Critérium du Dauphiné Libéré. At the French National Road Race Championships, he supported his teammate André Darrigade to beat Bobet for the title. Towards the end of the season, Anquetil won the national championship in the individual pursuit on the track, finished sixth in the world championship road race, before adding a third straight victory at the Grand Prix des Nations.

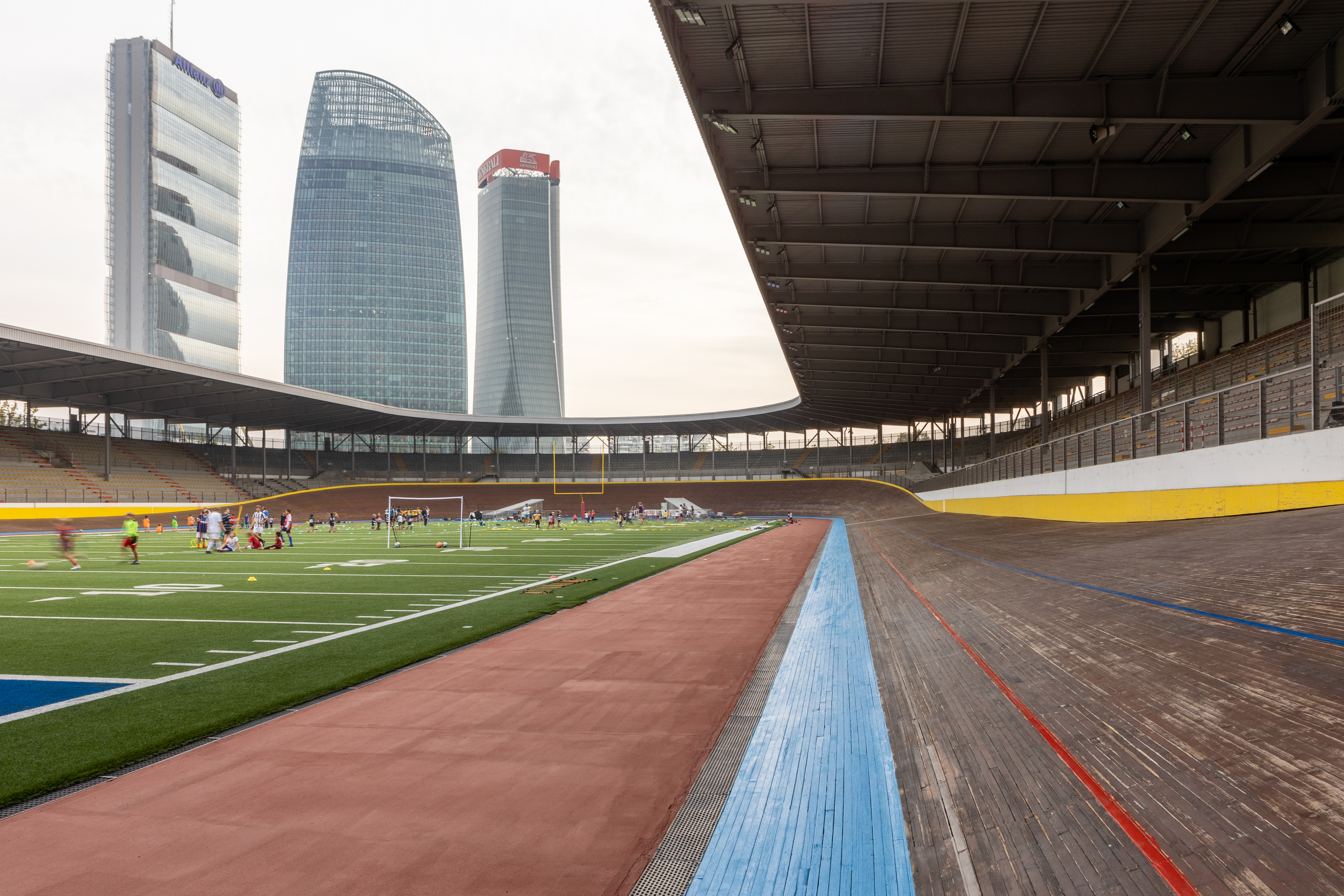
The Velodromo Vigorelli in Milan, where Anquetil set his hour record.

Momentum had been building in the press, urging Anquetil, known for his strength in time trials, to attempt to beat Coppi's hour record for the longest distance covered in an hour, set in November 1942. Eventually, Anquetil announced that he would attempt to break the record, set for 22 October 1955 at the Velodromo Vigorelli in Milan. Anquetil started his attempt in a very high speed and was soon up on Coppi's split times, but eventually slowed and he grew exhausted towards the end and failed, posting a distance 600 m (660 yd) shorter than Coppi. His final race of the season was once again the Trofeo Baracchi, this time teamed with Darrigade, only to again come second to the pairing of Coppi and Filippi.

Due to the ongoing Algerian War, every military service included a six-month stint in Algeria, which Anquetil had to begin in the second half of 1956. He therefore decided to make another attempt at the hour record before. Beforehand, he won another national pursuit title, but had to drop out of Paris–Nice due to a crash. Now riding for the Helyett team, he went on to win a stage at the Three Days of Antwerp. Anquetil then made his second attempt at the hour record on 25 June. Having again started too fast, he abandoned the attempt with five minutes to go. Another attempt was scheduled just four days later. This time not starting too fast and keeping to a rigid schedule, Anquetil finally managed to beat Coppi's distance on the third attempt, breaking the hour record with 46.159 km (28.682 mi), 311 m (340 yd) further than Coppi.

After his record, Anquetil continued the season by taking the silver medal in the individual pursuit at the Track Cycling World Championships. Another victory at the Grand Prix des Nations followed. Anquetil and Darrigade then went together to Italy to compete for the first time in the Giro di Lombardia, one of cycling's monument classics, a race that Darrigade won. Anquetil was then posted to Algeria and ended his season.

=== 1957: first Tour de France victory ===
Anquetil was discharged from the army on 1 March 1957. His first race back came just one day later, at Genoa–Nice, where he finished second in the sprint to Bobet. The result was impressive, considering that Anquetil had gained 10 kg (22 lb) during his time in the army. It took him one month and 1,200 km (750 mi) of training to get back to his previous weight, before he started Paris–Nice. In the race, he won the mountainous stage 5 time trial, putting him into the overall lead, which he defended until the end. In a last-minute decision, Anquetil then again competed at the Track World Championships in the individual pursuit, but lost his race against eventual champion Roger Rivière.

By now, Anquetil was considered a possible favourite for the Tour de France, the most prestigious cycling race in the world. At this time, the riders in the Tour did not compete in trade teams, as in every other race, but in national teams. The selection for the French team was difficult for its manager Marcel Bidot. The previous year's race had been won by a relatively unknown French rider from a regional team, Roger Walkowiak. This made him an automatic pick for the national team this time around. Meanwhile, three-time Tour winner Bobet, and with him his teammate Raphaël Géminiani, were also expected to be in the selection. Anquetil and Darrigade on the other hand publicly announced they would only ride if both were selected together. The selection was decided in Anquetil's favour when Bobet announced during the Giro d'Italia that he would skip the Tour.

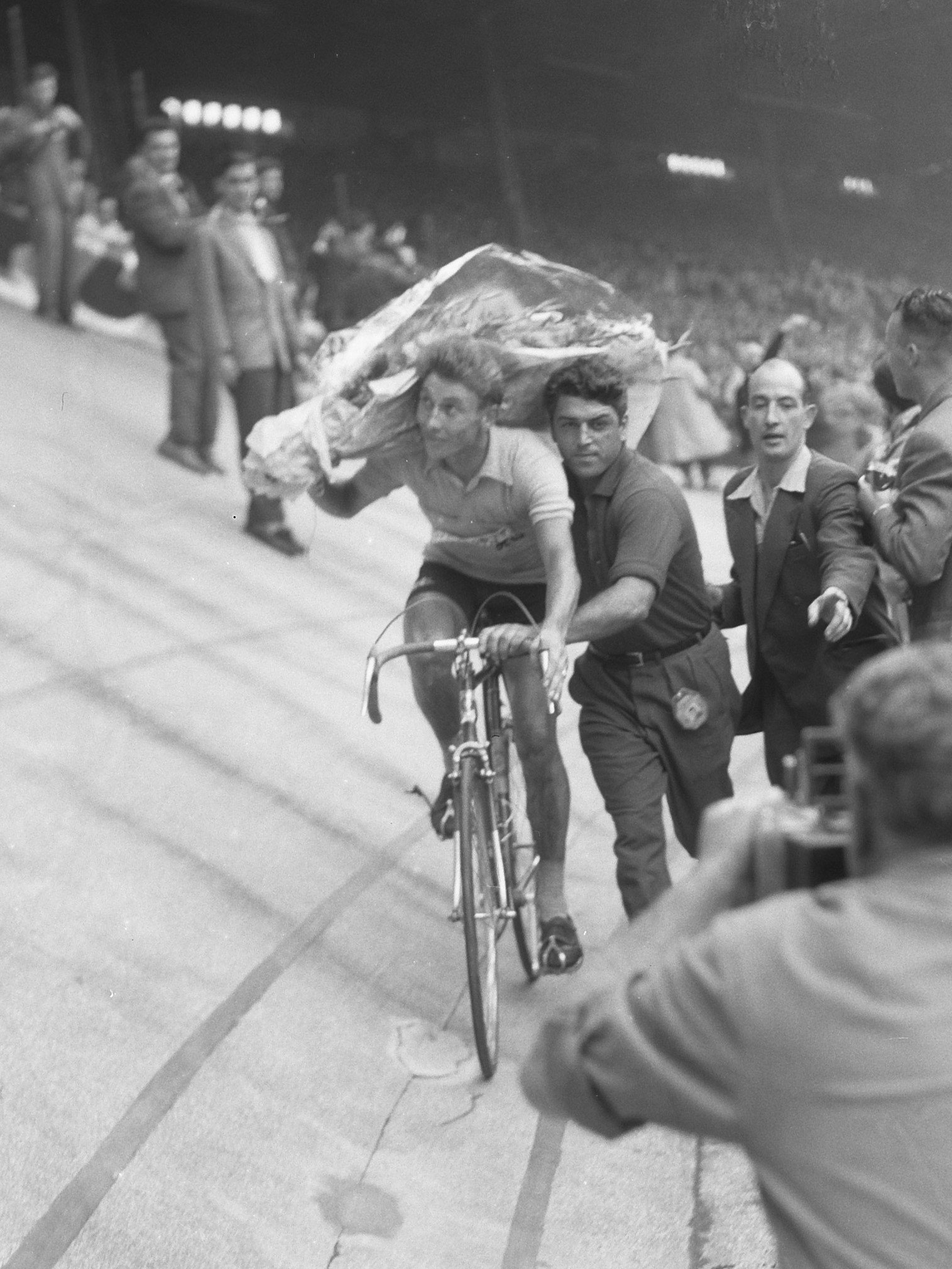
Anquetil doing a lap of honour in the Parc des Princes velodrome after winning the 1957 Tour de France

At the Tour, Anquetil was the only debutant in the French team. On stage 1, he was involved in a crash, but was safely brought back into the field. Anquetil's first stage win came on stage 3 into his home town of Rouen. On stage 5 into Charleroi, Anquetil escaped with another rider and gained the yellow jersey of leader in the general classification for the first time in his career. He held the lead for two days and then attacked on stage 9 and won the into Thonon-les-Bains to reclaim the yellow jersey, gaining 11 minutes on his principal rivals. Federico Bahamontes, another race favourite, retired on the following rest day, due to the intense heat wave affecting the race. On the first high-mountain stage of the race into Briançon, Anquetil finished fourth, less than two minutes behind stage winner Gastone Nencini and Marcel Janssens, but retained the lead, 11 minutes ahead of Janssens. Following some uneventful stages, Anquetil's rivals took advantage of him riding towards the back of the peloton to attack on stage 14, building a seven-rider lead group, all of which were within the top ten in the general classification. Darrigade fell back and worked with Anquetil to close the gap back down. The following day, Anquetil won the time trial at the Montjuïc circuit in Barcelona to extend his overall lead. He lost small amounts of time on stage 18, but bounced back to win the stage 20 time trial to seal his first victory in the Tour de France. His eventual winning margin over Janssens was almost 15 minutes. At 23, he was the youngest Tour winner since the end of World War II.

After the Tour, Anquetil competed in the World Championships in Waregem. The final part of the race was contested between a six-men group consisting of three French and three Belgian riders. Rik van Steenbergen won the sprint ahead of Bobet and Darrigade, while Anquetil finished sixth. He then won the Grand Prix des Nations again, beating Ercole Baldini. At the Six Days of Paris, he competed with Darrigade and Italian Ferdinando Terruzzi on the track, winning the event.

=== 1958: année terrible ===
In 1958, Anquetil started his season slowly. He won the time trial stage at Paris–Nice in March, but only finished tenth overall, the same position he achieved at Milan–San Remo a couple of days later. After finishing twelfth at the Critérium National, he targeted Paris–Roubaix, a race he felt suited him. Still 200 km (120 mi) from the finish, he launched an attack, creating a 17-rider lead group, which soon broke down to just four due to Anquetil's relentless pace setting. However, the Belgian teams in the peloton never allowed the gap to grow to over four minutes. While Anquetil managed to come back to the lead group after puncturing a tyre with 13 km (8.1 mi) left to run, the group was eventually caught 4 km (2.5 mi) before the finish. The failure to win at Roubaix was noted by the public, since it had been the first time that he had started a classics race with the intention of winning. Anquetil bounced back from the disappointment by taking victory at the Four Days of Dunkirk. In preparation for the Tour de France, Anquetil then finished eighth at the national championships.

As defending champion, Anquetil was the French team's number one choice for the Tour de France. However, Bidot could not leave out three-time winner Bobet, which left the team with two captains. Anquetil agreed to this, but insisted that Bobet's close ally Géminiani be left off the squad. Bidot relented and as Bobet did not stand up for Géminiani, their friendship was heavily strained thereafter. Géminiani went to the Tour as the leader of the Centre-Midi regional team and used every opportunity to attack the main French squad. (Note: Géminiani went so far as to bring a donkey to the start of the Tour, declaring to have christened it "Marcel", since it was "just like Bidot - stubborn and stupid.") After an uneventful start to the race, Géminiani attacked on stage 6 and gained ten minutes on Anquetil. Two days later, during the first time trial of the Tour, Anquetil was dealt another blow when Charly Gaul, usually considered more of a climber than a time trialist, managed to beat Anquetil in his favourite discipline, albeit by just seven seconds. On stage 18, a mountain time trial up Mont Ventoux, Anquetil lost more than four minutes on Gaul. While he had predicted such a result before the Tour started, as the climb suited Gaul more than him, it was still a blow considering the time Anquetil had already lost. Géminiani meanwhile did enough to secure the yellow jersey and gained more time on the following stage, owing to an untimely mechanical issue for Gaul. Going into stage 21 to Aix-les-Bains, Géminiani led the overall standings, Anquetil was third, 7:57 minutes behind, while Gaul was fifth at more than 15 minutes deficit. The stage featured five climbs, on the second of which Gaul attacked in rainy and cold conditions. Anquetil followed and was only two minutes behind Gaul at the foot of the next climb, the Col de Porte. The weather then got to Anquetil, who had opted to wear a light silk jersey instead of one made of wool. He lost 22 minutes by the end of the stage and developed a chest infection. Géminiani fared little better, losing 15 minutes to Gaul, who would go on to win the Tour after winning the final time trial. Even with his infection, Anquetil still decided to start the following stage in order to help the French team win the team classification, but after he coughed up blood, he was taken to hospital with 40.6 °C (105.1 °F) fever and was forced to abandon.

Anquetil took some time to recover from his infection. In what he later described as the lowest point in his career, he even contemplated to retire, but eventually continued his career. The illness still hampered his efforts at the World Championships in Reims, where he abandoned. He recovered to win three end-of-the-season time trials, the Grands Prix in Geneva and Lugano, and the Grand Prix des Nations for the sixth time in a row. He then finished twelfth at both Paris–Tours and the Giro di Lombardia, before ending the road season by coming second at the Trofeo Baracchi. On the track, Anquetil, Darrigade, and Teruzzi then defended their title at the Parix Six-Days to close out the year, the last time the event was held at the Vélodrome d'Hiver. Anquetil's biographer Paul Howard later described 1958 as his année terrible ["terrible year"].

=== 1959: failed attempt at the Giro–Tour double ===
By the beginning of 1959, Roger Rivière had emerged as a serious challenger to Anquetil. Not only had he beaten Anquetil on his way to becoming World Champion in the individual pursuit, he also broke Baldini's hour record and eventually improved it once again, becoming the first man to cover more than 47 km (29 mi) in an hour. Both riders faced each other for the first time on the road at the 1959 Paris–Nice. (Note: That year called Paris–Nice–Rome, ending in Rome.) Neither rider won, and Rivière finished higher on the overall classification, but Anquetil's teammate Jean Graczyk took the victory and Anquetil was faster in the time trial.

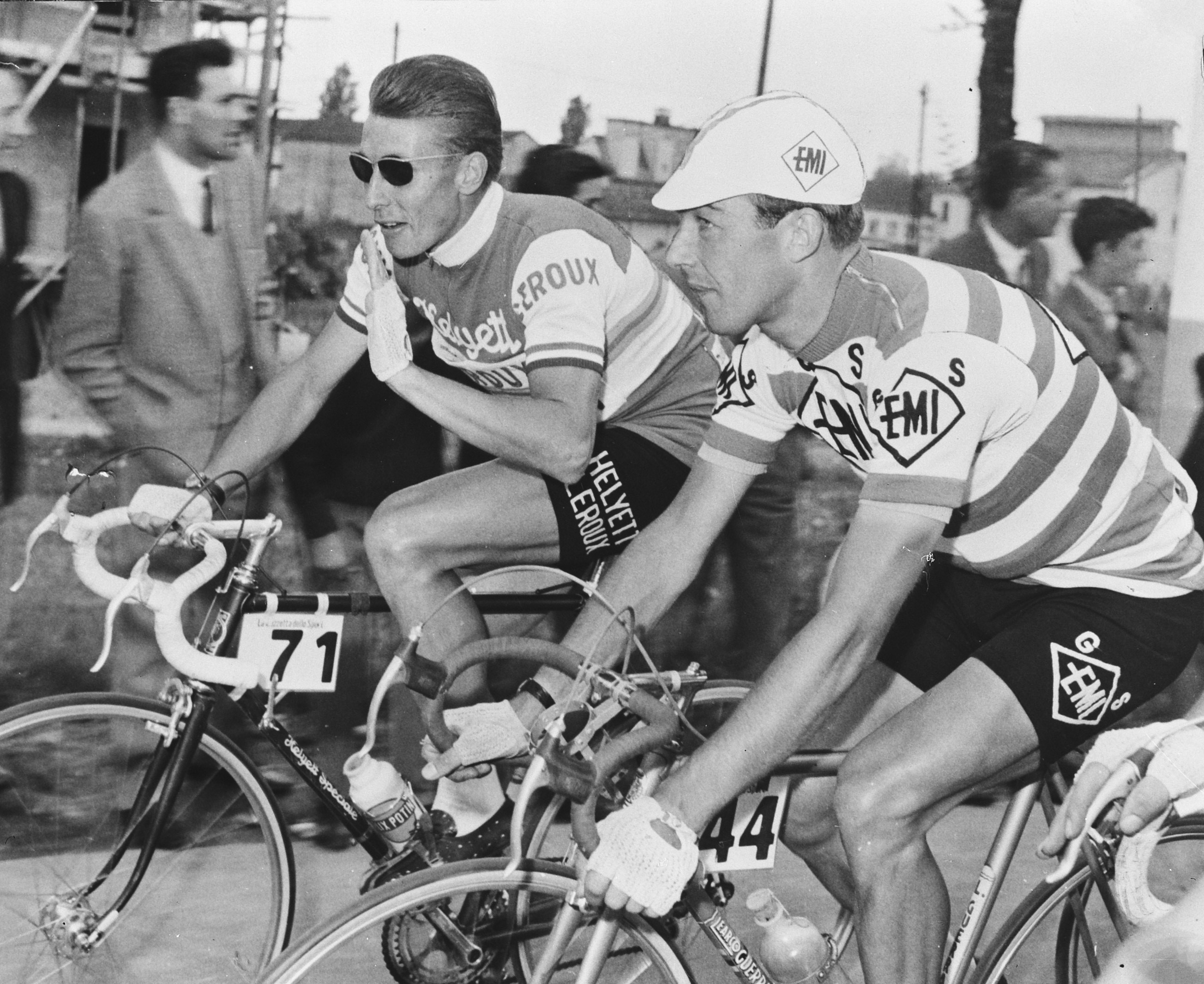
Charly Gaul (right) beat Anquetil (left) into second place at the 1959 Giro d'Italia.

For 1959, Anquetil had set himself the target to equal his idol Fausto Coppi by winning the Giro d'Italia and the Tour de France in the same year. Also at the Giro was Gaul, who had won the race previously, in 1956. Anquetil started the race strongly, taking the race leader's pink jersey after a short time trial on stage 2. He lost his lead to Gaul the following day, at a hilltop finish. Gaul increased his advantage on stage 7 by winning the mountain time trial up Mount Vesuvius, extending his advantage over second-placed Anquetil to 2:19 minutes. Anquetil was able to gain back 22 seconds on Gaul the next day, in another time trial. During stage 12, which featured three ascents of Monte Titano in San Marino, he managed to distance Gaul, gaining one-and-a-half minutes, reducing his deficit to just 34 seconds. On stage 15, Anquetil escaped with several other riders on a downhill and gained another two-and-a-half minutes on Gaul, taking back the pink jersey. While leading the race, Anquetil then won the stage 19 time trial to Susa. Riding at an average speed of 47.713 km/h (29.647 mph) (faster than Rivière's hour record speed), Anquetil still managed to gain only 2:01 minutes on Gaul, who had started his effort one-and-a-half minutes ahead of Anquetil, and once the latter passed him, had hung on to limit his losses. After the time trial, Anquetil led Gaul by 3:49 minutes in the overall standings. The decisive stage therefore came on stage 21 to Courmayeur, where Gaul attacked on the Col du Petit-Saint-Bernard and eventually arrived at the stage finish almost ten minutes ahead of Anquetil to seal overall victory. Anquetil finished the Giro in second place, 6:12 minutes behind Gaul.

For the Tour de France, the French national team started with four possible contenders for overall victory: Anquetil, Bobet, Géminiani, and Rivière. While the latter two were riding on the same trade team and got along well, there was little sympathy and cooperation between the riders otherwise. In the event, Bobet retired from what would be his last Tour on top of the Col de l'Iseran, while Géminiani was significantly weaker than the year before and was not a threat for overall victory. The French team's main challengers would come from Gaul, Spain's Federico Bahamontes, Italian Ercole Baldini, and Henry Anglade, a Frenchman riding on the Centre/Midi regional team. The first notable stage for the general classification came in form of the stage 6 time trial, which was won by Rivière, 21 ahead of Baldini and almost a minute faster than Anquetil. The following day, Anglade was part of a breakaway that gained nearly 5 minutes on the rest of the field. On stage 13, Anglade won ahead of Anquetil, with Baldini and Bahamontes also in the lead group. Gaul suffered on the stage and lost twenty minutes, effectively ruling him out of contention. Anglade was now second in the overall standings, more than 3 minutes ahead of Baldini, Bahamontes, and Anquetil, while Rivière was more than six minutes behind Anglade. Two days later, Bahamontes won the mountain time trial up the Puy de Dôme, taking more than three minutes out of Anglade's lead. Anquetil now laid sixth in the standings, more than five minutes behind second-placed Bahamontes. On stage 17 in the Alps, Bahamontes and Gaul escaped together, the latter taking the stage win while Bahamontes moved into the race lead, finishing three-and-a-half minutes ahead of the other challengers. The next stage was the decisive one of the race, with several high mountain climbs. Following the Col de l'Iseran, Anquetil and Rivière found themselves in a lead group, having distanced Bahamontes and Gaul, but allowed them to catch back on. On the descent of the following climb, the Col du Petit-Saint-Bernard, Anglade, Baldini, and Gaul attacked. Anquetil and Rivière then both assisted Bahamontes in regaining contact with the others. Baldini would win the stage while Bahamontes remained in the lead, 4:04 minutes ahead of Anglade, who lost another minute the following day. In the time trial on the penultimate stage to Dijon, Rivière again won ahead of Anquetil, beating him by 1:38 minutes, while Bahamontes sealed overall victory. As the French riders entered the Parc des Princes during the final stage, they were booed by the crowd, who felt that Anquetil and Rivière had colluded with Bahamontes against their fellow Frenchman, Anglade. The decision to have done so might have been affected by the fact that, had another French rider won the Tour, Anquetil's market value for participation money in the lucrative post-Tour criteriums would have been less. (Note: Anquetil made no secret that he embraced the hostile reaction of the crowd, later naming a boat he owned Sifflets '59 ["The Whistles of '59"].) Anquetil eventually finished the Tour third overall, 17 seconds ahead of fourth-placed Rivière.

At the World Championships in Zandvoort, Anquetil finished ninth as his friend Darrigade won the title. In early September, he won the prestigious Critérium des As, run behind dernys. Anquetil ended his season with victories at the Grand Prix Martini and Grand Prix de Lugano time trials, but for the first time since his first victory in 1953, he did not compete in the Grand Prix des Nations, won by Aldo Moser ahead of Rivière. At the Trofeo Baracchi, Anquetil, paired with Darrigade, finished only third, after they missed the start time by over a minute, but where also outridden by the pairing of Moser and Baldini.

=== 1960: Giro d'Italia success ===
Following two years without victory in a major stage race and with Rivière proving his match in time trials, Anquetil's star seemed to be fading at the beginning of 1960. Not wanting to share leadership of the French team with Rivière, Anquetil therefore chose to focus solely on the Giro d'Italia this year. At Paris–Nice, in the team time trial on stage 2, Anquetil, who had suffered mechanical issues, was dropped by his teammates and lost four-and-a-half minutes on his principal rivals. On stage 4, a large breakaway got clear and Anquetil's team decided not to organize a chase. This allowed the leading group to come in more than 23 minutes ahead of the field, making it virtually impossible for anybody not in it to compete for overall victory. Anquetil's poor form was further highlighted when he finished only fourth in the time trial on stage 6b and he retired the following day. He then finished third at the Critérium National, before coming in fourteenth at the Tour of Flanders.

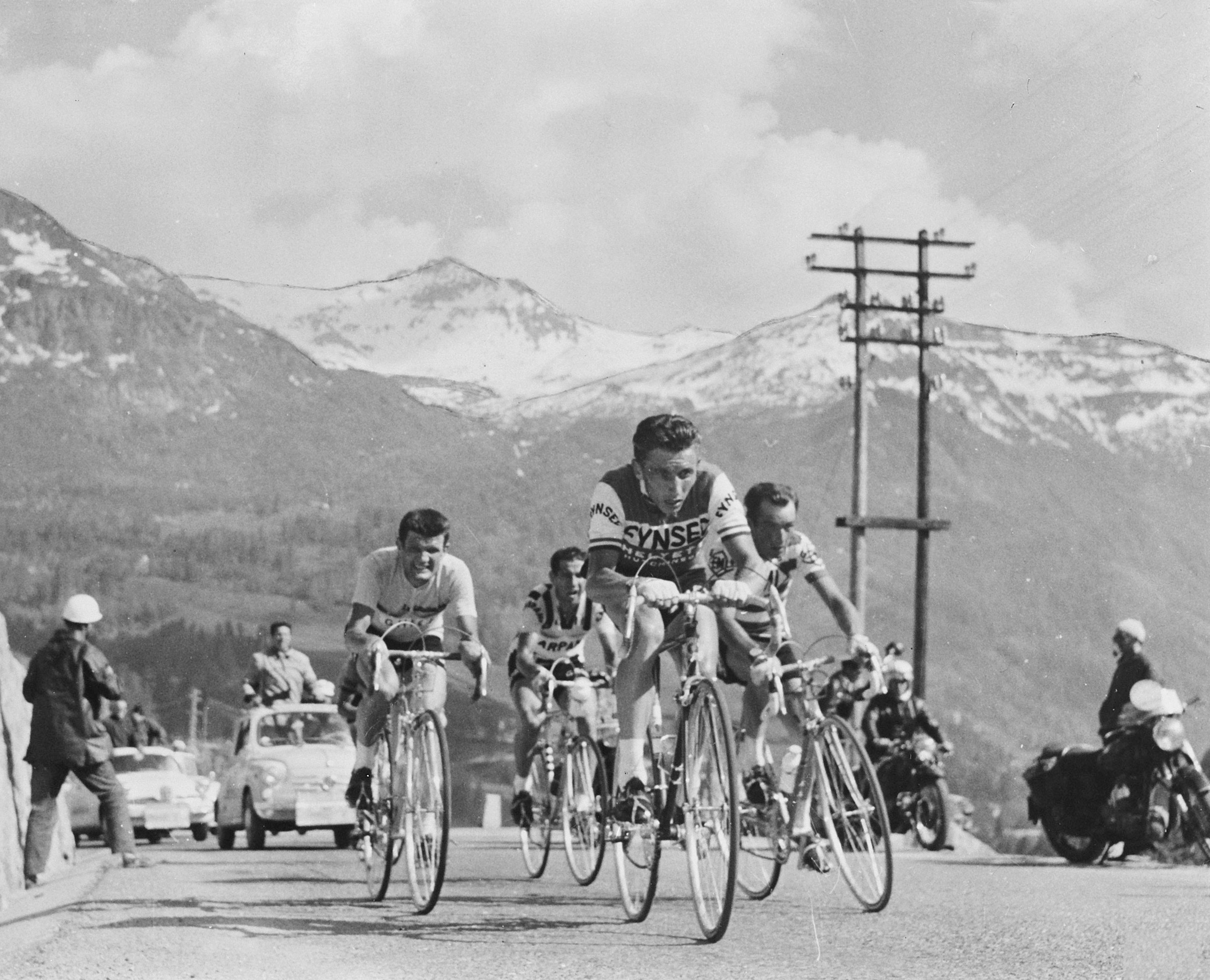
Anquetil (centre) climbing during the 1960 Giro d'Italia alongside Jos Hoevenaers, Gastone Nencini, and Charly Gaul (from left to right)

In the first time trial of the Giro d'Italia, Anquetil finished second, but then took advantage of a breakaway he was part of on stage 3 to take the overall lead. Anquetil then led the lead move to Jos Hoevenaers, who had been part of a breakaway on stage 6. In the long time trial of the race on stage 14, Anquetil retook the lead, finishing 1:27 minutes ahead of Baldini and more than 6 minutes on Gaul. His speed had been so fast that had the organizers applied the usual rules, 70 riders would have missed the time cut. In the event, the rules were loosened and only two riders eliminated. Ahead of the final mountain stages, Anquetil now led Nencini by 3:40 minutes, with Gaul in fifth, 7:32 minutes behind. Stage 20 included the Gavia Pass for the first time in the race's history. On the ascent, Nencini was able to establish a gap to Anquetil, after the latter had a flat tire. More punctures and three bike changes followed on the dangerous descent, putting Anquetil's race lead in danger. He teamed up with Agostino Coletto, whom he offered money to help him in the chase effort, to limit his losses. At the finish in Bormio, Gaul won ahead of Nencini, with Anquetil losing only 2:34 minutes and retaining the pink jersey by 28 seconds. Following a ceremonial final stage, Anquetil arrived in Milan the winner of the Giro for the first time.

In Anquetil's absence, Rivière competed in the 1960 Tour de France as leader of the French team and was well placed when, on stage 14, he crashed while trying to follow Nencini on a steep descent. He fell 10 m (11 yd) down a ravine and broke two vertebrae, immediately ending his career. The great rivalry with Anquetil therefore ended abruptly. Paul Howard later wrote that with Rivière's accident "by late 1960 Anquetil was temporarily free from a serious adversary, at least within French cycling circles".

At the World Championships in East Germany, Anquetil arrived with little preparation, but still managed to finish ninth. Another strong time trial performance followed at the Grand Prix de Lugano, where Anquetil was so fast that second-placed rider Gilbert Desmet owed his position to the fact that Anquetil overtook him and he followed him into the finish. He followed this up with another victory at the Critérium des As, breaking the record speed in the process. Having attacked 10 km (6.2 mi) into the race to test his legs, Anquetil decided that he felt so good that he did not slow down and rode alone until the finish.

=== 1961: Tour de France return ===
In early 1961, Anquetil took victory at Paris–Nice. At the Critérium National, he attacked with 1.5 km (0.93 mi) left to go and won ahead of Darrigade, who had switched teams to Alcyon–Leroux. It was Anquetil's first ever victory at a one-day road race. He then competed in the Tour de Romandie, winning the time trial and finishing tenth overall, in preparation for the Giro d'Italia.

At the Giro, Anquetil won the time trial on stage 9 and gained the pink jersey the following day, when he was part of a breakaway that reached the finish ahead of previous leader Guillaume van Tongerloo. On stage 14, a seven-rider breakaway got away, which included Arnaldo Pambianco, who was third overall. At the finish, they had a 1:42 minute advantage on the peloton containing Anquetil, putting Pambianco into the lead. Anquetil then lost another twenty seconds on stage 17, before the race reached the high mountains. On the decisive stage 20, which featured the climbs of the Penser Joch and the Stelvio Pass, Gaul won two minutes ahead of Pambianco, with Anquetil losing another three minutes (two of which in time bonuses). Therefore, Pambianco won the Giro, 3:45 minutes ahead of Anquetil.

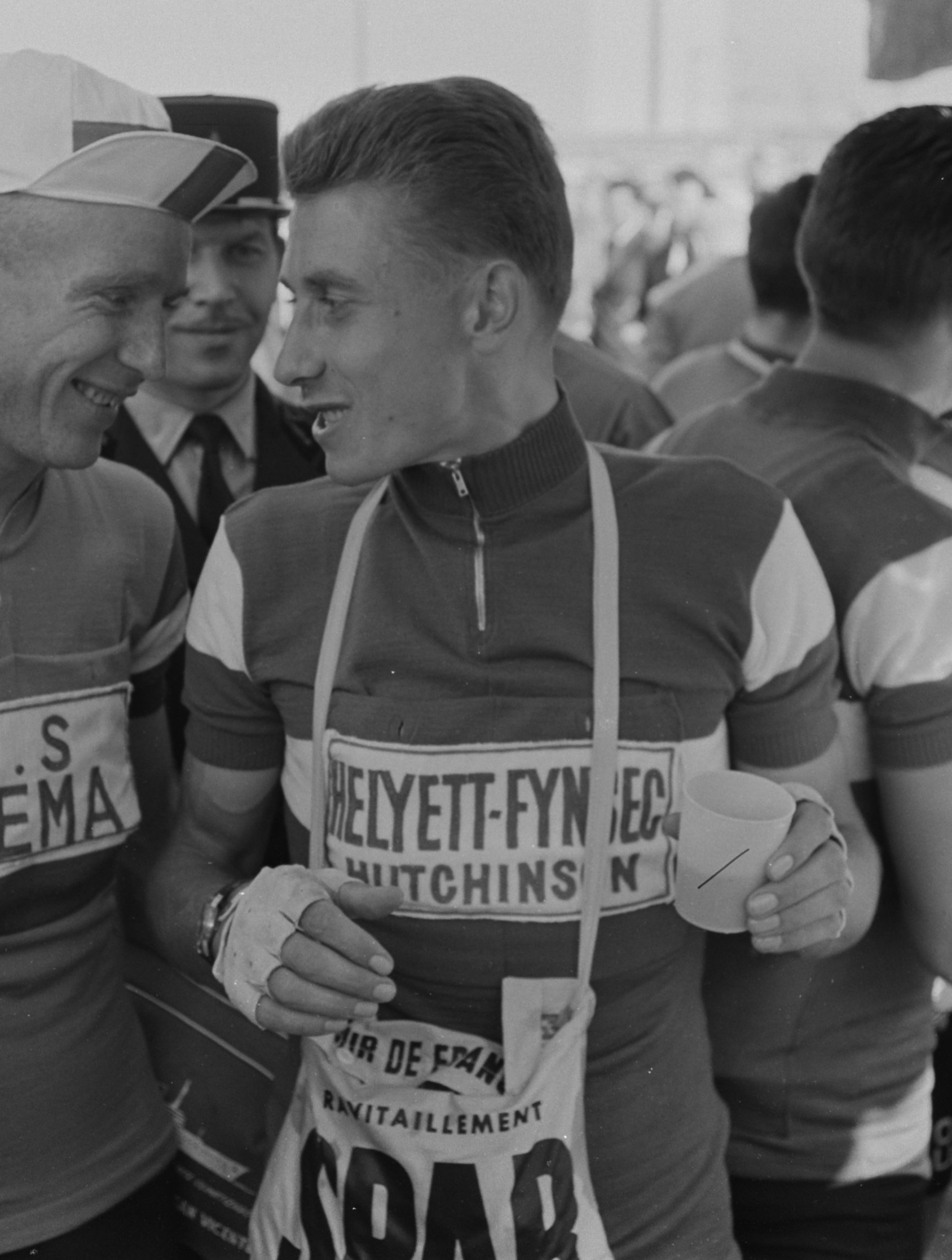
Anquetil talking to Piet van Est during the 1961 Tour de France

At the National Championship race before the Tour, Anquetil finished fourth, with the title going to Raymond Poulidor, who had earlier in the year won Milan–San Remo. Poulidor would emerge as Anquetil's new main rival, but was left out of the French team for the upcoming Tour de France as his team manager Antonin Magne did not want him to have to work for Anquetil. The Tour began in Anquetil's home town of Rouen and before the start, he announced that he planned to hold the race lead from the first day until the end. There were two stages run on the first day, a road stage to Versailles in the morning and then a time trial in the afternoon, with the yellow jersey only being awarded at the end of the day. Anquetil already got in the winning breakaway on the first stage, won by Darrigade, and then in the afternoon, he won the time trial by more than three minutes from the rider in second place to move into the overall lead. Over the course of the race, Anquetil rode very passively, only chasing down attacks and limiting his losses, but never going on the attack himself. This led to a race that was considered dull by the public, with sales numbers of the organizing newspaper L'Equipe going down as the Tour progressed. Anquetil won the time trial on stage 19 to effectively seal his second Tour de France victory, finishing the course almost three minutes faster than second-placed Gaul. On the final stage into Paris, he attacked together with teammate Robert Cazala, who won the stage. Guido Carlesi used the same breakaway to distance Gaul and take over second place. Anquetil's winning margin over him was 12:14 minutes. Due to what the spectators considered a lack of excitement during the race, Anquetil was booed when they arrived at the Parc des Princes.

Following the Tour, Anquetil competed at the World Championships in Bern, finishing in the lead group in 13th place. He then rode the Grand Prix des Nations for the first time since 1958, taking victory in record time and beating second-placed Desmet by more than nine minutes. Following victory at the Grand Prix de Lugano, he managed only fifth place at the Trofeo Baracchi, partnered by Michel Stolker, his worst position at the event during his career. Nevertheless, at the end of the season he was honored with the Super Prestige Pernod for the first time, an award given to the best rider of the year based on points given for high positions in prestigious races.

=== 1962: third Tour de France victory ===
For the new season in 1962, Anquetil's team Heylett folded and merged with the Saint-Raphaël team, whose sporting director was Géminiani, Anquetil's former rival, who had since retired. His early season results were not good, having to retire from both Genoa–Nice and Paris–Nice. Anquetil had set himself the goal to become the first rider to have won all three of cycling's Grand Tours, which meant that for 1962, he targeted the Vuelta a España. Here, he had to share team leadership with Rudi Altig. The race came down to the time trial on stage 15, which Altig won decisively. Anquetil then dropped out of the race following the stage, only to be diagnosed with viral hepatitis once back in France. Altig eventually won the Vuelta. Against the advice of his doctor, who felt that the illness had weakened Anquetil too much, he then raced in the Critérium du Dauphiné Libéré in preparation for the Tour. He suffered during the fifth stage, where he lost 17 minutes, but managed to finish the race in 12th place overall.

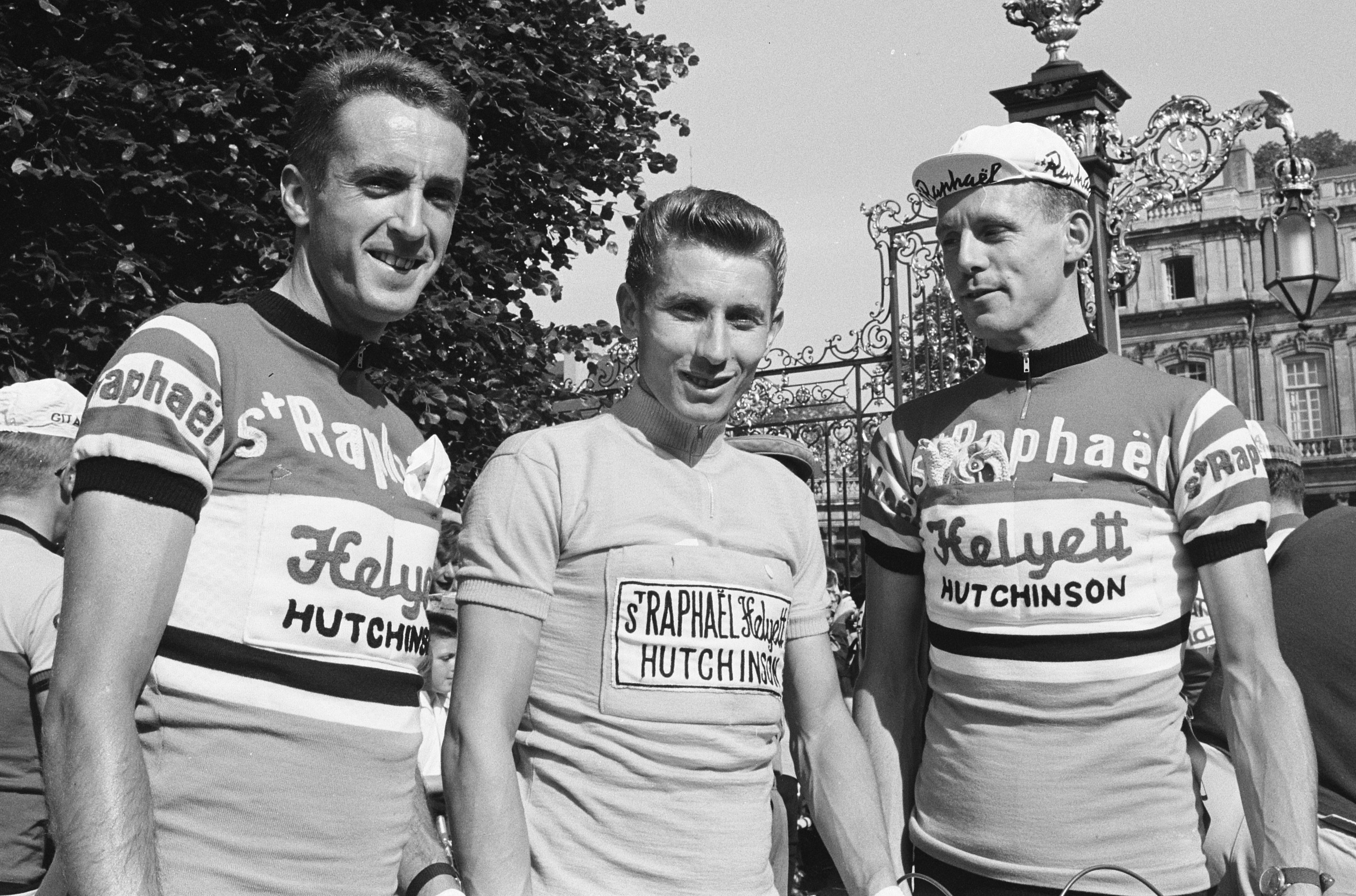
Anquetil with his Saint-Raphaël teammates Ab Geldermans (left) and Mies Stolker (right) at the 1962 Tour de France

For the 1962 Tour de France, the organizers dropped the provisions of national teams and allowed the riders to compete in trade teams, meaning that Anquetil rode for Saint-Raphaël. Poulidor was considered his main competition along with reigning World Champion Rik van Looy, both were riding their first Tour. A break within the peloton on the first stage, won by Altig, saw Poulidor lose almost 8 minutes. Anquetil won the stage 8b time trial and moved into 12th place in the general classification, behind a number of riders who had been in an earlier breakaway, but were not considered threats for overall victory. On stage 11, the first in the Pyrenees, van Looy was brought down when a motorbike caused a crash, leading him to abandon. After stage 12, also in the high mountains, Anquetil moved up into sixth place. The following day was a mountain time trial to Superbagnères. Anquetil finished the day third, behind stage winner Bahamontes and Jef Planckaert, the surprise of the Tour, who moved into the race lead, with Anquetil in fourth, 1:08 minutes behind. On stage 19, Poulidor escaped and went on to win the stage, while Anquetil finished with Planckaert, which left their time difference intact. However, Anquetil had moved up to second and Poulidor up to third. In the 68 km (42 mi) time trial on stage 20 to Lyon, Anquetil won with ease, catching Poulidor for three minutes at the half-way mark of the course and beating Planckaert by 5:19 minutes. This gave Anquetil a record-equalling third Tour victory, 4:59 minutes ahead of Planckaert, who showed sportsmanship when he did not attack Anquetil when the latter suffered a crash on the final day into Paris. After the Tour, it was discovered that Anquetil had ridden the entire event with a tapeworm.

While recovering from the worm, Anquetil placed only fifteenth at the World Championships in Salò, won by his friend and teammate Jean Stablinski. Still weakened, he then skipped most of the late-season time trials, but for the Trofeo Baracchi, which he attended together with Altig. Not having prepared well for the event, Anquetil suffered from the beginning and was unable to take turns at the front, forced to stay in Altig's slipstream and at some points suffering the humiliation of Altig having to push him in order to keep up. When they reached the finish, their time was taken at the entrance of the velodrome. As they entered the arena, Anquetil was unable to take the sharp right turn onto the track, drove onto the grass, and crashed into a crowd of spectators. The pair had won the event, in record time, but Anquetil was brought into hospital, his face covered in blood, while Altig took the victory lap on his own. Feeling humiliated by the experience, Anquetil prepared well for a similar two-men time trial event two weeks later in Altig's home country, in Baden-Baden. This time, it was Anquetil who set a high pace which Altig had a hard time following.

=== 1963: Vuelta-Tour double ===
Early in 1963, Anquetil won Paris–Nice and the Critérium National in preparation for another attempt at the Vuelta. He lined up at the 1963 Vuelta a España in good shape. He won the stage 1b time trial on the first afternoon by 2:51 minutes on the second placed rider, including the time bonus, he already held more than three minutes advantage on his rivals. Anquetil's team managed to neutralize all the attacks during the difficult first week. The remaining stages were mostly flat and suited Anquetil. Even though he only finished second on the stage 12b time trial to Tarragona, suffering from stomach cramps, he eventually won the Vuelta easily, beating José Martín Colmenarejo by 3:06 minutes. With his victory, he became the first rider to have won all the Grand Tours.

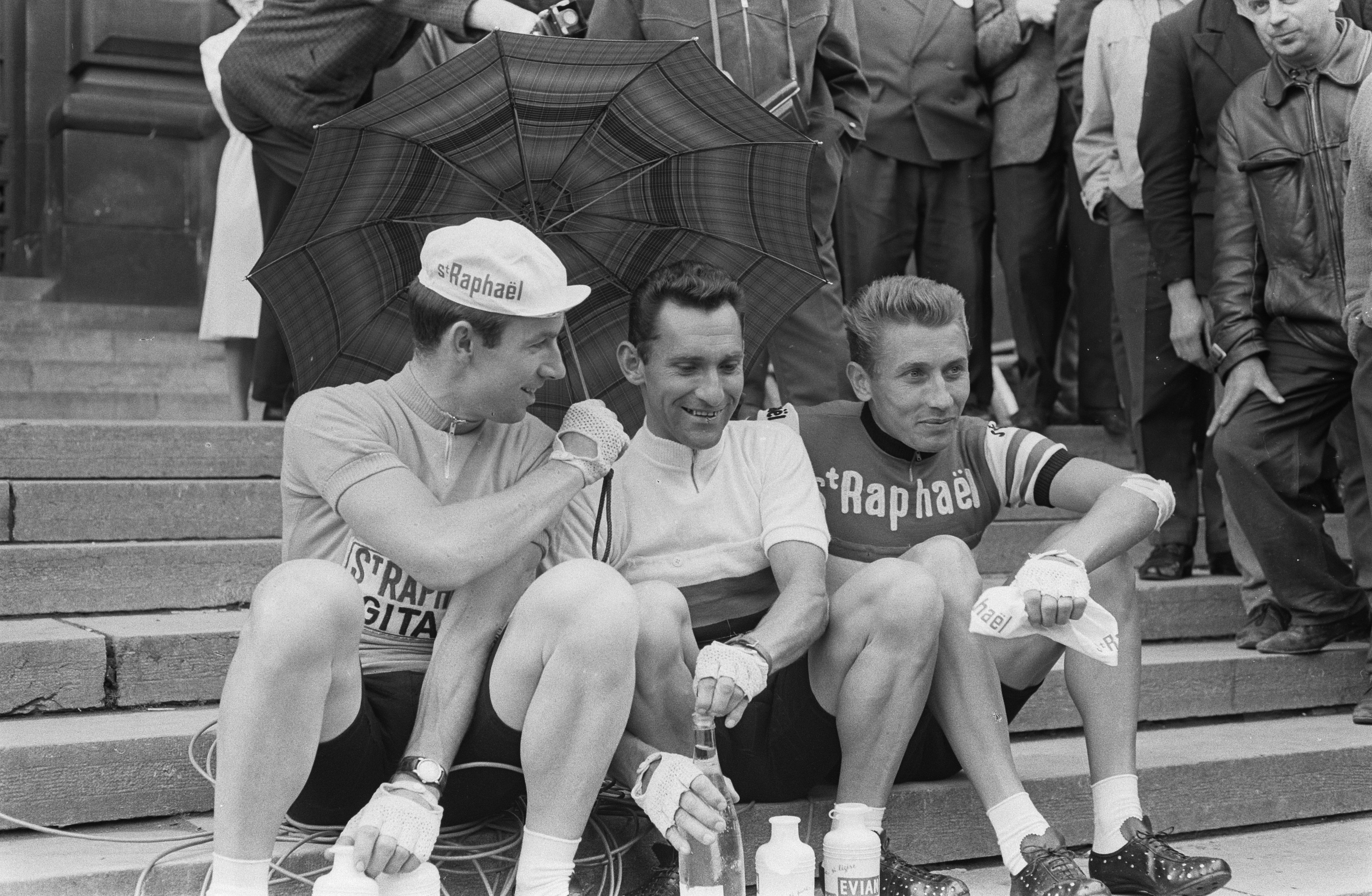
Anquetil (right) with teammates Shay Elliott and Jean Stablinski at the 1963 Tour de France

To prepare for the Tour, Anquetil competed in the Critérium du Dauphiné Libéré, where he won the time trial and the general classification. Thereafter, he helped Stablinski to victory at the National Championships, himself finishing third. The Tour de France became a fight between Anquetil and Bahamontes, who gained time when he got into a breakaway on the first stage. After winning the stage 6b time trial, Anquetil moved up into seventh place overall, behind a number of riders who had been in earlier breakaways, but more than a minute ahead of Bahamontes and Poulidor. On stage 10, he managed to stay with Bahamontes and outsprinted him at the finish, gaining his first-ever victory on a mountain stage. On stage 17, Anquetil and Géminiani used a ruse, pretending to suffer a broken chain, to allow Anquetil to switch to a lighter bike for the ascent of the Col de la Forclaz, allowing him to stay with Bahamontes on the steep climb and again outsprint him at the finish. He had therefore moved into the race lead, extending his advantage in the final time trial. His eventual winning margin over Bahamontes was 3:35 minutes as he became the first rider to win the Tour four times.

At the World Championship road race in Ronse, Anquetil was leading alone with 1 km (0.62 mi) ahead of the chasing field, but led up his effort when he turned around to see the other riders approaching. After the finish, second-placed van Looy was irritated at Anquetil, saying that he had given up his chance at certain victory. Towards the end of the season, he competed in the Trofeo Baracchi, partnered with Poulidor, where they finished second. For the second time, he won the Super Prestige Pernod for the best rider of the season.

=== 1964: Giro d'Italia, a fifth Tour de France, and the duel with Poulidor ===
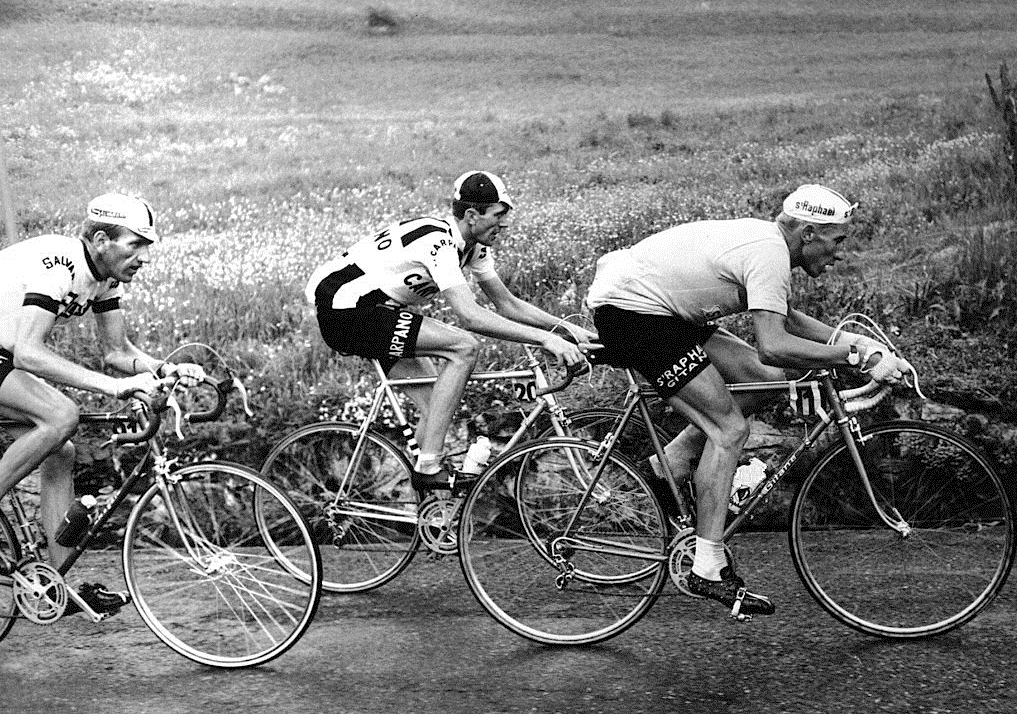
Vittorio Adorni, Italo Zilioli, and Anquetil (from left to right) at the 1964 Giro d'Italia

At the beginning of the 1964 season, Anquetil raced at Paris–Nice again, being beaten in the uphill time trial by Poulidor and finishing only sixth. When he lined up for the spring classic Gent–Wevelgem, few expected much of him, since Anquetil did not usually excel at one-day races. A few kilometres before the finish, Anquetil, not familiar with the course, asked another rider where the finish was. Given the answer that it was not far away, he broke away from the field for an unlikely victory, his first at a one-day road race outside of France. For 1964, Anquetil had again set himself the target to emulate Coppi by winning the Giro and the Tour in the same year. He started the Giro d'Italia strongly, winning the stage 5 time trial at a speed of more than 48 km/h (30 mph), taking the race lead in the process. Though he was unable to add another stage victory, he would not lose the pink jersey until the finish in Milan, beating Italo Zilioli by 1:22 minutes.

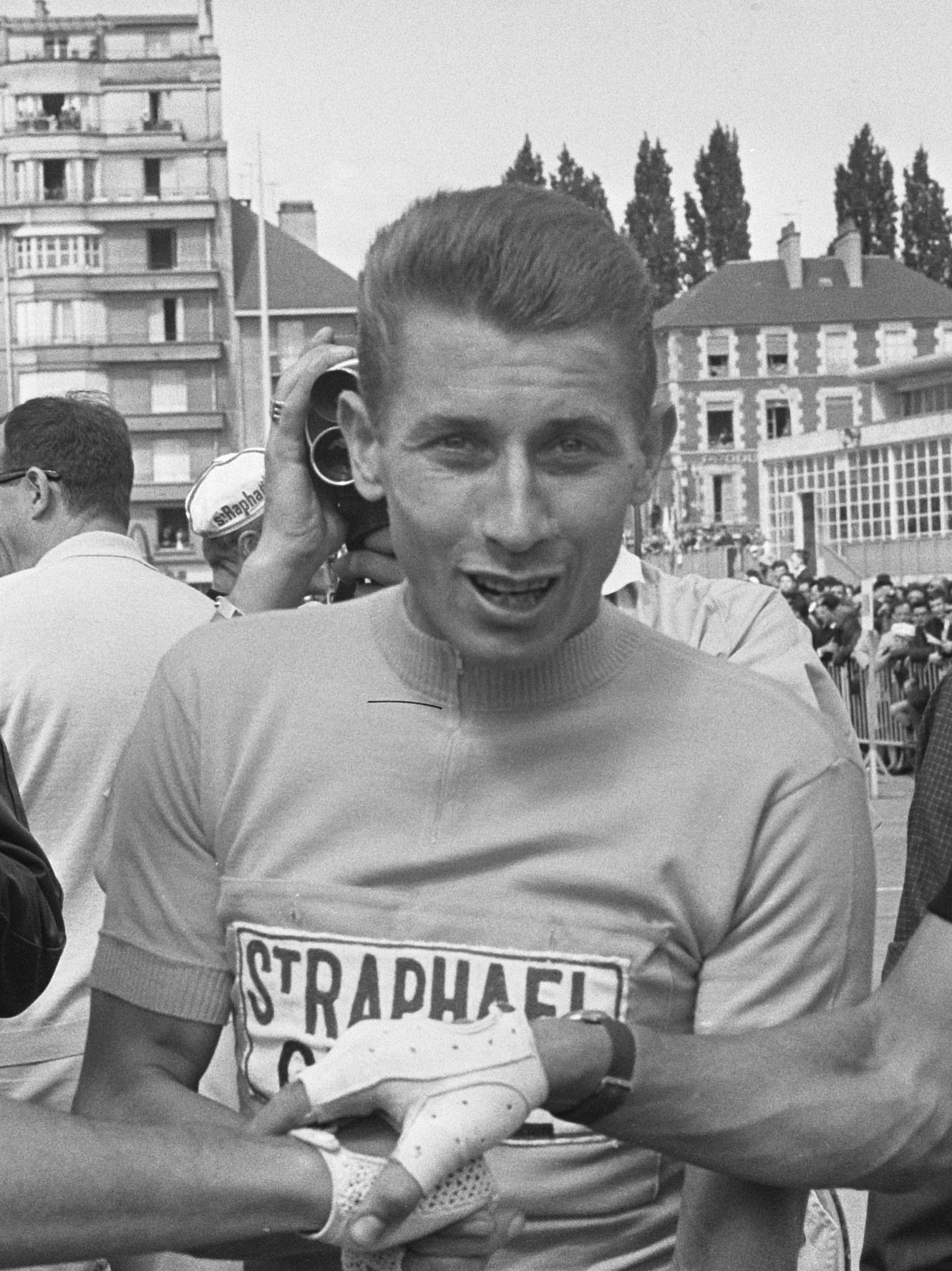
Anquetil at the 1964 Tour de France

The 1964 Tour de France would become a two-man fight between Anquetil and Poulidor. The latter lost 14 seconds after a crash on the first stage, but took some time back when he escaped in a group on stage 7, with Anquetil reaching the finish 34 seconds behind. The next day, Anquetil lost another 47 seconds, as Poulidor finished second and Anquetil suffered a puncture. On stage 9, finishing in Monaco, Poulidor sprinted for the stage victory and celebrated, only to realize there was another lap to run. The second time around, it was Anquetil who won the stage and with it a one-minute time bonus. The next day, Anquetil also won the time trial, taking another 46 seconds advantage on Poulidor. In the general classification, Anquetil now was second, with Poulidor third, 31 seconds behind. During the rest day in Andorra, Anquetil, known for his extravagant eating habits, was pictured eating a méchoui, an entire lamb. The next day, stage 14, Anquetil started badly, falling behind on the first climb and even contemplating retiring from the race. Being four minutes behind Poulidor, Bahamontes, and yellow jersey Georges Groussard, Anquetil found himself in a group of seven riders who worked well together and succeeded in bridging the gap. Poulidor then had to change bikes with 28 km (17 mi) to go, and fell into the ditch when his director pushed him too hard when he got going again. By the end of the stage, Poulidor had lost 2:37 minutes on Anquetil. Poulidor managed to record a strong solo victory on the following stage into Luchon, gaining enough time to close the gap on Anquetil in the general classification to just nine seconds. In the stage 17 time trial, Anquetil took victory, but Poulidor managed to reduce his losses to just 37 seconds, even though he suffered a puncture and a slow bike change, leaving him 56 seconds down on Anquetil overall. Stage 20 was the decisive leg of the race, ending on the Puy de Dôme climb. Poulidor attacked early in the stage, but was brought back by Anquetil with the help of Altig. As they reached the final climb, Bahamontes and Julio Jiménez escaped, while Anquetil and Poulidor made the ascent side-by-side. In what would become one of the Tour's most historic stages, the two opponents went up the climb elbow to elbow, until 900 m (980 yd), Anquetil weakened, allowing Poulidor to slowly get ahead of him. By the finish, Poulidor had taken 42 seconds out of Anquetil's advantage, who remained in the yellow jersey. After crossing the finish line, Anquetil asked Géminiani how much time he had lost. When his sporting director answered "Fourteen seconds", Anquetil replied: "Well, that's thirteen more than I need." Anquetil then went on to win the final time trial into Paris, extending his eventual winning margin to 55 seconds over Poulidor. It was Anquetil's fifth Tour victory and the fierce duel between him and Poulidor started a cycling boom in France. Anquetil became the first rider since Coppi to win both the Giro and the Tour in the same year. (Note: The feat has since been repeated by Eddy Merckx (1970, 1972, 1974), Bernard Hinault (1982, 1985), Stephen Roche (1987), Miguel Induráin (1992, 1993), Marco Pantani (1998), and Tadej Pogačar (2024).)

Anquetil raced little after the Tour, finishing seventh at the World Championships in Sallanches and skipping all of the end-of-season time trials.

=== 1965: Critérium du Dauphiné Libéré and Bordeaux–Paris ===
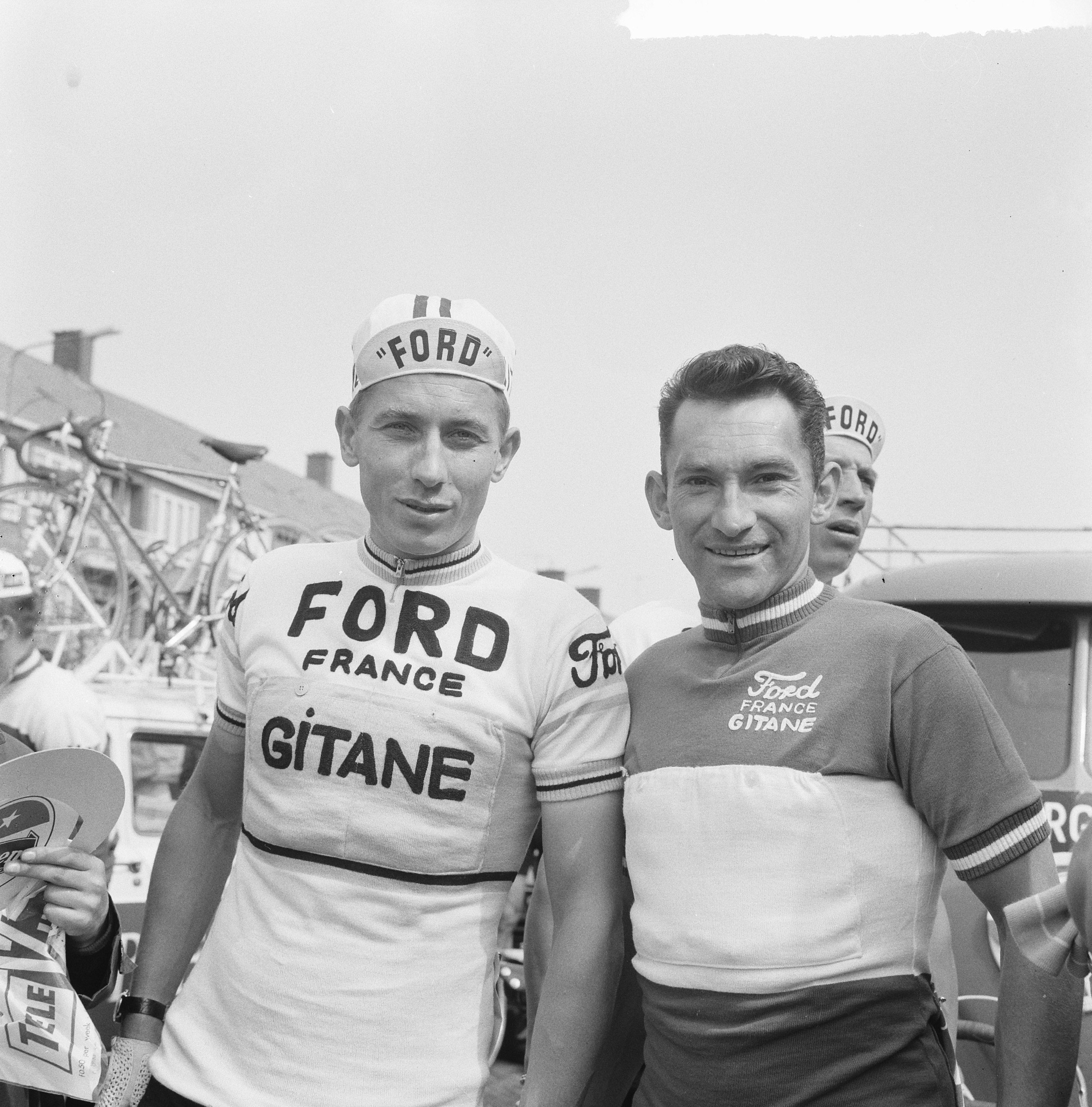
Anquetil and his close friend and teammate Jean Stablinski (right) at the Tour of the Netherlands in 1965

For 1965, Saint-Raphaël stopped sponsorship of Anquetil's team, which was taken over by Ford France. In those days, the main income for professional cyclists came from criteriums, small races run over laps in city centres, usually held shortly after the Tour de France. Since Anquetil had found that winning more Tours would not increase his value in terms of start money, he opted not to race any of the three Grand Tours in 1965. Early in the season, he won both Paris–Nice and the Critérium National and also participated for three days in the Monte Carlo Rally to placate his new sponsor Ford.

Instead of the Grand Tours, Géminiani decided to propose another feat: the 1965 Critérium du Dauphiné Libéré ended on the same day that the 560 km (350 mi) classic Bordeaux–Paris started, a race partly done behind dernies due to its excessive length. Géminiani pitched the idea to Anquetil's wife Jeanine, who then convinced her husband to try to win both races. The announcement of the attempt made headlines in the newspapers, bringing significant publicity to both events. The organizers of the Critérium du Dauphiné, originally reluctant of the idea, eventually aided the attempt by moving the start time of the final stage one hour forward to give Anquetil enough time to get from Avignon (finishing town of the Dauphiné) to Bordeaux. At the Critérium du Dauphiné, Anquetil won narrowly, mostly through time bonuses at stage finishes and a slender victory in the time trial. However, he eventually won the race by 1:43 minutes over Poulidor. Just 15 minutes after standing on the podium at 5 pm, Anquetil was already in a car, being driven to the hotel for a bath and dinner, before heading to Nîmes airport, boarding a private jet which flew him to Bordeaux. The race to Paris started in the middle of the night, and Anquetil, not having slept, suffered at the beginning. Coming close to retiring in the early hours of the morning, he was convinced by his teammates to continue. He eventually joined a breakaway with Tom Simpson and Stablinski and then attacked on the Côte de Picardie climb, 8 km (5.0 mi) from the finish, and went on to win the race by 57 seconds ahead of Stablinski.

After failing to finish the World Championships in San Sebastián, Anquetil returned to the end-of-season time trials. He won the Grand Prix des Nations ahead of Altig and then beat Gianni Motta at the Gran Premio di Lugano. Anquetil then won his second ever Trofeo Baracchi, partnered with Stablinski. For the third time, Anquetil won the Super Prestige Pernod.

=== 1966: Grand Tour return and Liège–Bastogne–Liège victory ===
Anquetil started the 1966 strongly with victory at the Giro di Sardegna. At Paris–Nice, he was in the race lead but lost time to Poulidor on a hilly time trial due to his bike not being fitted properly. Anquetil then struck an alliance with the Italian riders around Gianni Motta and their joint attacks put Poulidor under pressure, allowing Anquetil to win the stage and the race overall. In early May, he was on the start line for Liège–Bastogne–Liège, the oldest race on the cycling calendar and one of the sport's so-called monuments. Anquetil felt he had a chance of victory at escaped alone from a group containing Motta, Felice Gimondi, and a young Eddy Merckx. Even though the trio worked together well to bring him back, Anquetil's advantage continued to grow until the finish, where he won by almost five minutes. After the finish, he was approached while conducting interviews, being told he had to deliver a urine sample for the doping control, but he did not pay any attention to it and left. The next day, news broke that he had been disqualified by the Belgian cycling federation for his refusal. Following Anquetil's insistence that he had not been approached for the test officially, the authorities relented and his victory was allowed to stand.

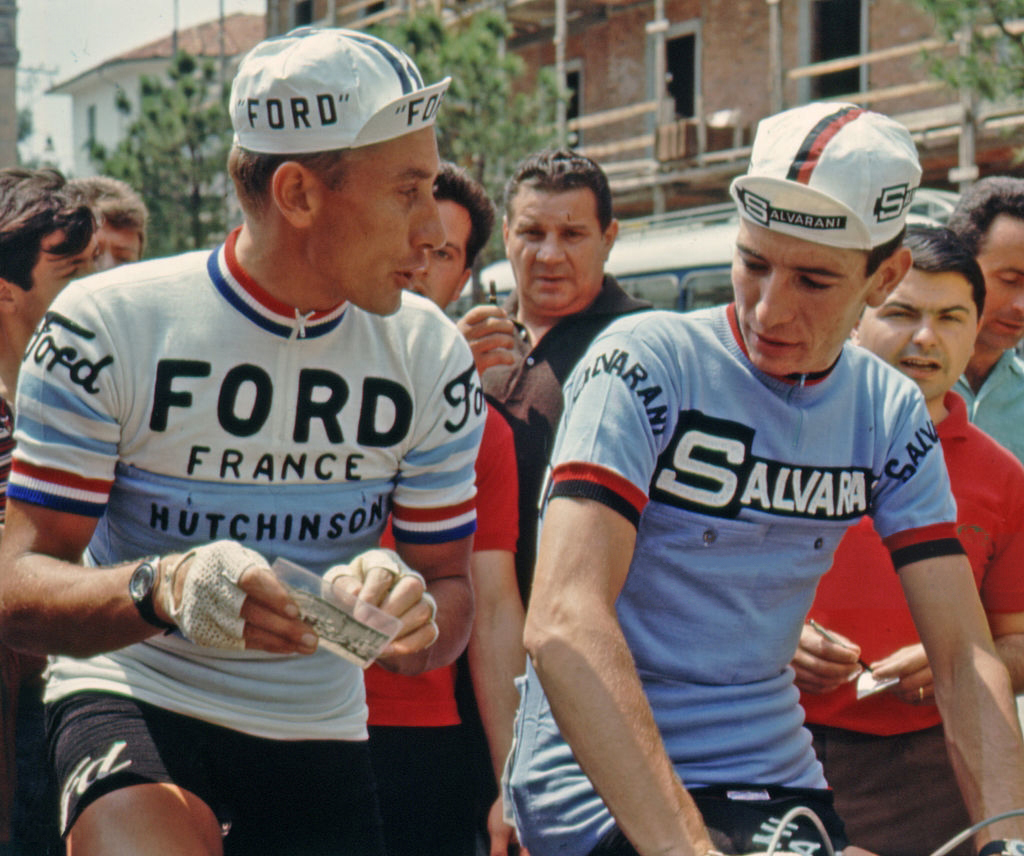
Anquetil and Felice Gimondi (right) at the 1966 Giro d'Italia

Unlike the previous year, Anquetil lined up for the 1966 Giro d'Italia. On the very first stage, he suffered two flat tires when an overenthusiastic fan tried to give him water, fell, and the glass bottle broke on the ground. A 22-rider group, containing all the other favourites, got away while Anquetil had his tires taken care of and at the finish, he had lost 3:15 minutes. Second place behind Vittorio Adorni in the stage 13 time trial brought him up to tenth place overall, but Anquetil no longer felt like he could win the Giro and set to preventing Gimondi from winning, since he considered the rising popularity of the young Italian a threat to his financial opportunities during the criteriums. After some strong riding in the mountain stages, Anquetil eventually finished third in the Giro, 4:40 minutes behind winner Motta.

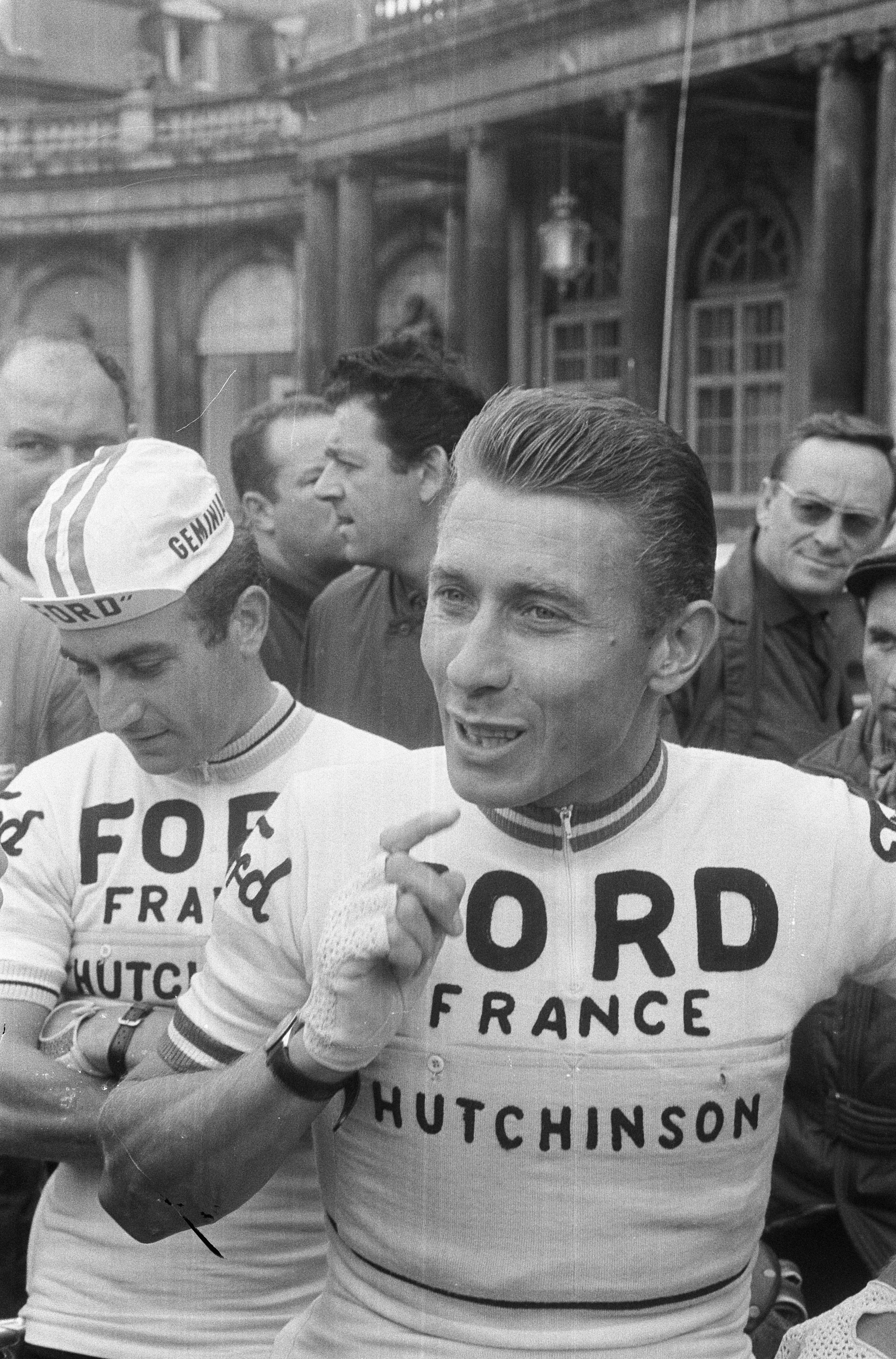
Anquetil (right) with eventual race winner Lucien Aimar at the 1966 Tour de France

The 1966 Tour de France was again expected to be a battle between Anquetil and Poulidor. On stage 9, Anquetil led a strike by the riders against the newly established anti-doping controls. Both Anquetil and Poulidor mainly marked one another, allowing Anquetil's teammate Lucien Aimar and Jan Janssen to gain time on stage 10. Poulidor won the time trial on stage 14b, 7 seconds ahead of Anquetil. On stage 17, Aimar took advantage of the stalemate to break away from the lead group, win the stage, and take over the race lead. Anquetil, weakened by illness, helped Aimar by chasing down attacks from Janssen and Poulidor over the next stage, before dropping out the next day. Aimar eventually won the Tour ahead of Janssen and Poulidor.

After the Tour, Anquetil competed at the World Championships held on the Nürburgring racing circuit. Late in the race, Anquetil and Poulidor were in a leading group with Motta, but both Frenchmen did not work together, allowing Altig to catch back up. In the final sprint to the line, Altig, by far the best sprinter, easily won, taking the title on home soil. Anquetil finished second, ahead of Poulidor, the highest position he would ever achieve in the World Championships. Anquetil then started and won the Grand Prix des Nations for the ninth time in his career, the final time he would ride the race. In the Super Prestige Pernod, Anquetil was highly placed going into the final race of the competition, the Giro di Lombardia. He finished fourth, earning him enough points to win the season-long competition for the fourth and last time in his career.

=== 1967–1969: final years and invalidated Hour Record attempt ===
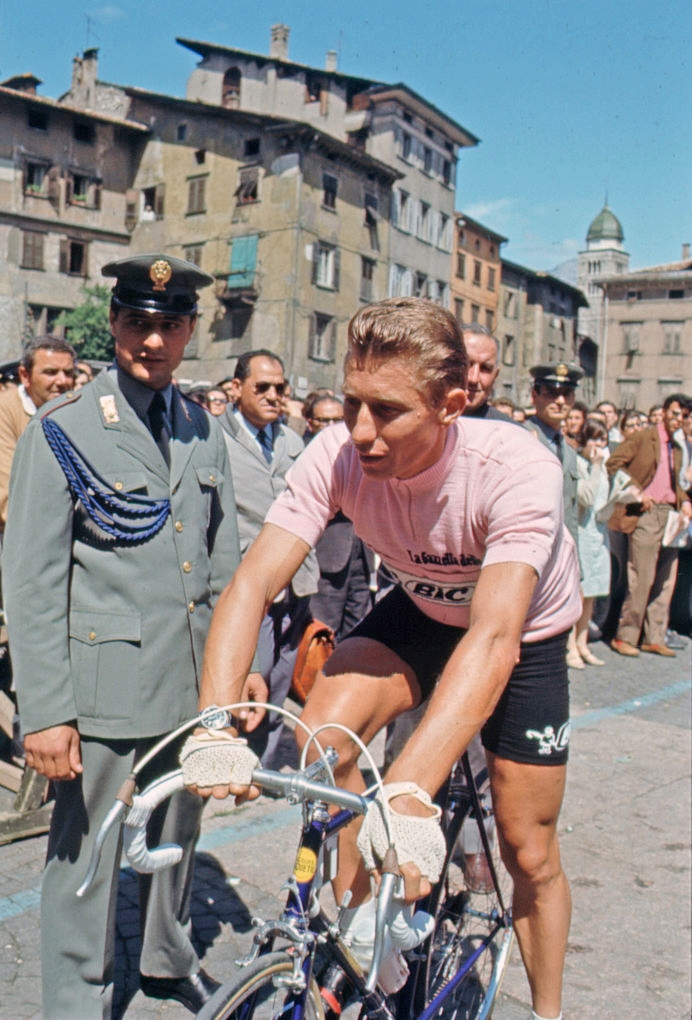
Anquetil in the pink jersey ahead of stage 21 of the 1967 Giro d'Italia, the last time he wore a leader's jersey at a Grand Tour.

With Ford France pulling out of sponsorship, Anquetil, like many of his teammates and director Géminiani, switched over to the Bic team. By 1967, Anquetil started to appear in less one-day races, but lined up on short notice at the Critérium National, held in his home town of Rouen, and won. Anquetil then again started at the Giro d'Italia, losing some time early on, before moving into the pink jersey with a fourth place in the stage 16 time trial, as all other favourites put in poor rides. He lost the lead the next day to Silvano Schiavon, who had shared a successful breakaway with Franco Balmamion. Having lost all but two teammates by the start of stage 20, Anquetil managed to limit his losses on the stage to regain the overall lead, albeit just 34 seconds ahead of Gimondi. During the following stage, he fended off several attacks, but eventually Gimondi managed to escape, gaining 4:09 minutes on Anquetil, relegating him to second place. On the penultimate stage on the final day, Anquetil made several attacks, but was unable to break away from Gimondi. Thus tired, he proceeded to lose second place to Balmamion and finished the Giro in third. (Note: In 2012, it was revealed that former deputy race director Giovanni Michelotti admitted late in his life to having aided Gimondi on stage 21 by giving him the slipstream of the race organization's car as he was riding away from Anquetil. He allegedly did so to make up for the fact that he had annulled the result of stage 19 to Tre Cime di Lavaredo after many riders had been pushed up the climb by spectators. Gimondi had originally won that stage and gained the pink jersey before the result was taken back.)

For its 1967 edition, the Tour de France reverted to national teams and Marcel Bidot picked Poulidor as leader, while Anquetil stayed away. He instead decided that he would make an attempt at breaking Rivière's now eleven-year old hour record. On 27 September, he made the attempt, again at the Velodromo Vigorelli, beating the record by 146 m (160 yd). After Anquetil finished his ride, he was approached by the doctor appointed by the sport's governing body, the Union Cycliste Internationale (UCI), to conduct his doping test. Géminiani protested that there was no lavatory on site at the velodrome and that Anquetil would not provide the urine sample out in the open. Since the doctor refused to travel with Anquetil to his hotel, no test was done and Anquetil's record therefore never ratified by the UCI. For the first time in his career, Anquetil was not chosen as part of the French team at the World Championships, but Anquetil managed a second place at the Trofeo Baracchi, partnering Bernard Guyot, to end his season. At the end of the year, Anquetil became chairman of the French Professional Cyclists Union, responsible for advocating the riders' interests towards the governing bodies and race organizers.

The final two seasons of Anquetil's career were relatively quiet. He did not race much in 1968, with his only victory coming at the Trofeo Baracchi, riding together with Gimondi. In 1969, he finished third at Paris–Nice and then won the Tour of the Basque Country, his last victory as a professional. His last professional race on the road was the World Championship road race in Zolder, where he placed 40th. He participated in a number of autumn criteriums and raced for the last time in Paris at the La Cipale velodrome at a track event, the venue would later be named after him. Anquetil's final outing was at a track event in Belgium (Note: There are conflicting reports on the location. While Richard Yates places the event in Brussels, Paul Howard writes that it was in Antwerp.) on 27 December 1969.

== Post-retirement ==
After he retired from professional cycling, Anquetil spent most of his time tending to his own farm, even though it was not profitable. He also owned several properties in Cannes as well as a gravel pit in Normandy. Apart from these business endeavors, Anquetil served as race director at both Paris–Nice and the Grand Prix du Midi Libre. He wrote columns for the L'Equipe sports newspaper and worked as commentator during races, first on the radio for Europe 1 and then on television for Antenne 2. In the early 1970s, Anquetil agreed to help Richard Marillier, who had been his superior in the army in Algeria, run the French national cycling team. Anquetil did not really fulfill any practical function in his position, but helped bring Marillier, who was relatively unknown in the cycling world, a greater sense of authority. Anquetil continued in this position until the 1987 UCI Road World Championships, shortly before his death.

== Anquetil–Poulidor: the social significance ==
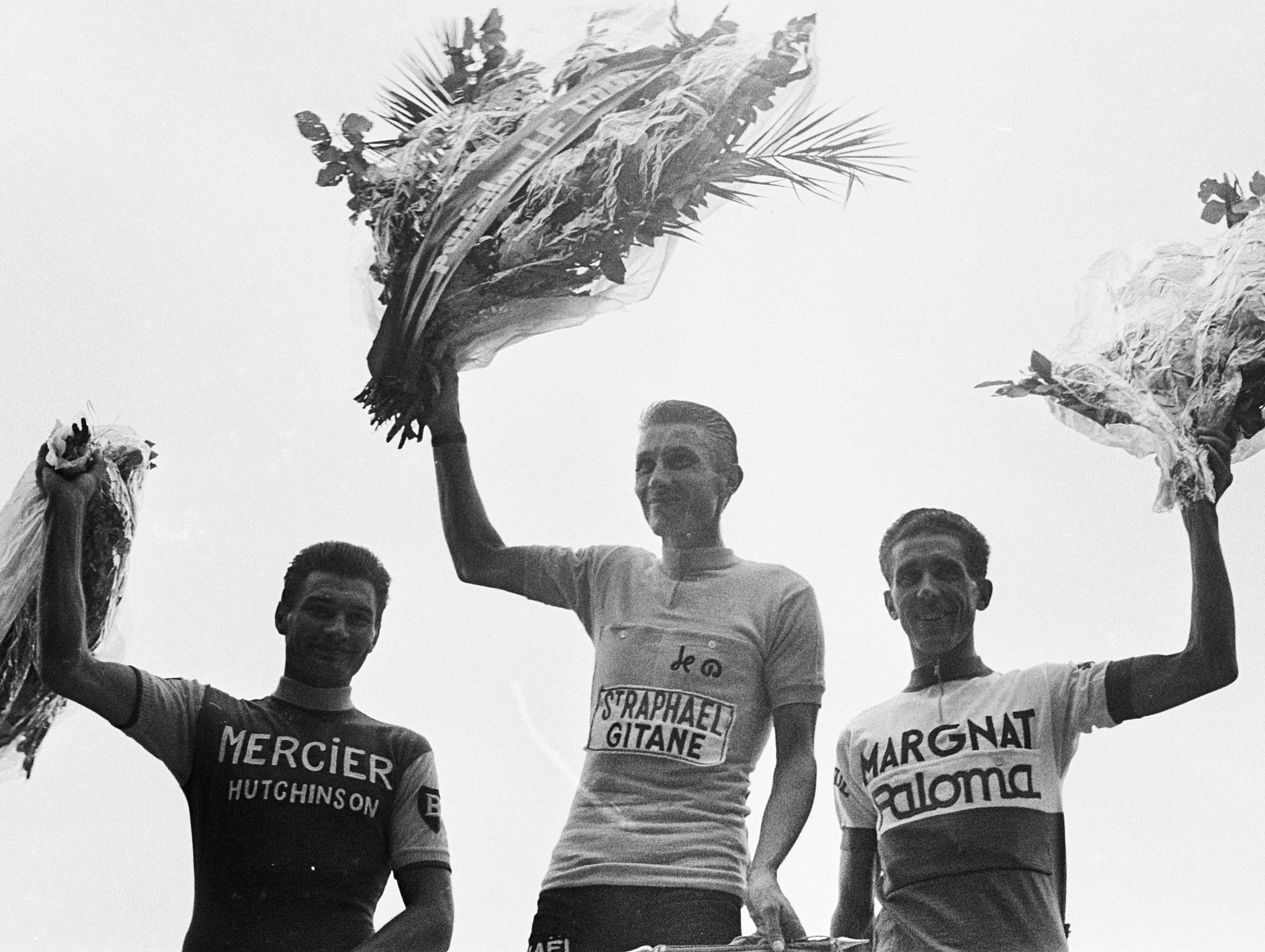
Raymond Poulidor, Anquetil, and Federico Bahamontes (from left to right) on the podium of the 1964 Tour de France

Anquetil unfailingly beat Raymond Poulidor in the Tour and yet Poulidor remained more popular. Divisions between their fans became marked, which two sociologists studying the impact of the Tour on French society say became emblematic of France old and new. The extent of those divisions is shown in a story, perhaps apocryphal, told by Pierre Chany, who was close to Anquetil:

The Tour de France has the major fault of dividing the country, right down to the smallest hamlet, even families, into two rival camps. I know a man who grabbed his wife and held her on the grill of a heated stove, seated and with her skirts held up, for favouring Jacques Anquetil when he preferred Raymond Poulidor. The following year, the woman became a Poulidor-iste. But it was too late. The husband had switched his allegiance to Gimondi. The last I heard they were digging in their heels and the neighbours were complaining.

Jean-Luc Boeuf and Yves Léonard, in their study, wrote:

Those who recognised themselves in Jacques Anquetil liked his priority of style and elegance in the way he rode. Behind this fluidity and the appearance of ease was the image of France winning and those who took risks identified with him. Humble people saw themselves in Raymond Poulidor, whose face – lined with effort – represented the life they led on land they worked without rest or respite. His declarations, full of good sense, delighted the crowds: a race, even a difficult one, lasts less time than a day bringing in the harvest. A big part of the public therefore finished by identifying with the one who symbolised bad luck and the eternal position of runner-up, an image that was far from true for Poulidor, whose record was particularly rich. Even today, the expression of the eternal second and of a Poulidor Complex is associated with a hard life, as an article by Jacques Marseille showed in Le Figaro when it was headlined "This country is suffering from a Poulidor Complex".

== Riding style ==
Anquetil was a smooth rider, a beautiful pedalling machine according to the American journalist Owen Mulholland:

The sight of Jacques Anquetil on a bicycle gives credence to an idea we Americans find unpalatable, that of a natural aristocracy. From the first day he seriously straddled a top tube, "Anq" had a sense or perfection most riders spend a lifetime searching for. Between 1950, when he rode his first race, and nineteen years later, when he retired, Anquetil had countless frames underneath him, yet that indefinable poise was always there.

The look was that of a greyhound. His arms and legs were extended more than was customary in his era of pounded post World War II roads. And the toes pointed down. Just a few years before, riders had prided their ankling motion, but Jacques was the first of the big gear school. His smooth power dictated his entire approach to the sport. Hands resting serenely on his thin Mafac brake levers, the sensation from Quincampoix, Normandy, appeared to cruise while others wriggled in desperate attempts to keep up.

== Personal life and family ==
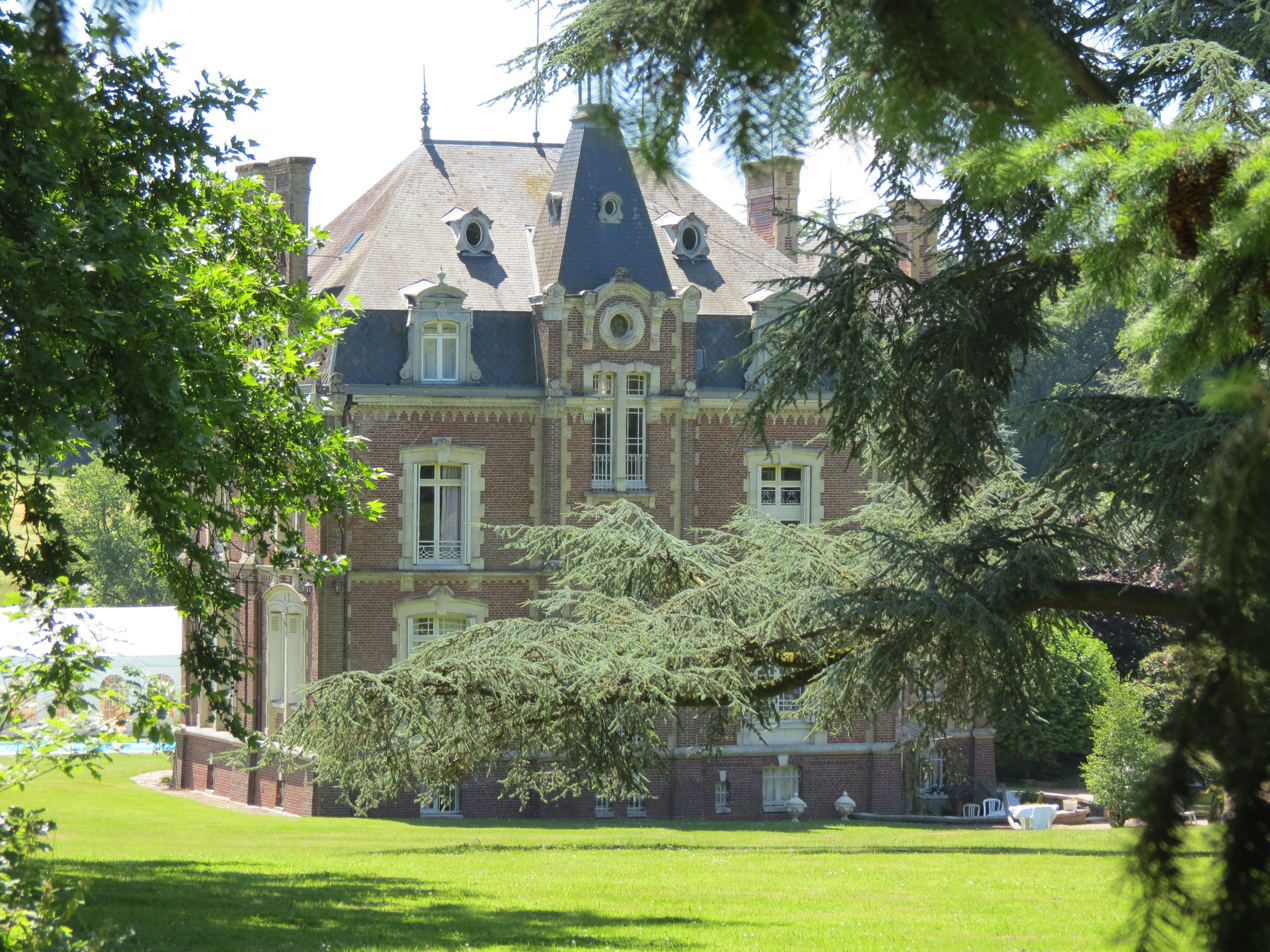
The château formerly owned by Anquetil near Rouen

Anquetil's grave in Quincampoix

In March 1957, Anquetil began an affair with Jeanine Boëda, the wife of his doctor and seven years his senior. They had known each other for several years before the start of their relationship. Anquetil had just been discharged from the army, where, in Algeria, he had begun an affair with Paule Voland, a ballet dancer at the Opera d'Algers. This affair had caused a public sensation and Voland traveled to Rouen in June 1957 to visit Anquetil's parents, in the belief that he would propose marriage to her. He eventually had Jeanine deliver the news to Voland that he did not intend to do so. In early 1958, Jeanine confessed the ongoing affair to her husband, who denied her a divorce. Anquetil then abandoned a training camp in the Mediterranean to travel to Normandy and showed up on the Boëdas' doorstep. Only dressed in her night clothes, Jeanine went with him to Paris. They lived together from that point on. Jeanine's two children, her daughter Annie and her son Alain, moved in with them two years later. Jeanine would accompany Anquetil to most of his races, at a time when it was unusual for a partner to do so. By the end of 1958, her husband granted Jeanine a divorce and she and Anquetil were married on 22 December 1958. In late 1967, Anquetil bought the château next to the farm he owned close to Rouen. He prolonged his career by two years in order to be able to pay it off.

Following his retirement from professional cycling, Anquetil had a strong desire to father a child of his own, however, Jeanine was no longer able to conceive. Anquetil therefore suggested using a surrogate mother, someone they would pay to have their child. Jeanine, not liking the idea of a stranger who they might deprive of their child, instead went to her 18-year-old daughter Annie, who consented to the idea of having a child with her stepfather. Even after their daughter, Sophie, was born in 1971, Annie and Anquetil remained in a sexual relationship while he remained happily married to Jeanine for another 12 years. While the general public was in the dark about the situation surrounding Sophie's parentage, according to Jeanine, their close friends knew about it. Annie eventually met another man and ended her relationship with Anquetil, moving out in 1983, while Sophie initially remained with him and her grandmother. Several months later, in an apparent attempt to win back Annie by making her jealous, Anquetil seduced Dominique, wife of his stepson Alain, who both lived with the family. Anquetil's new affair broke the family apart, with Sophie moving in with Annie and Jeanine leaving to live in Paris shortly thereafter. Alain also left and remarried. Anquetil and Jeanine were eventually divorced in September 1987. Dominique and Anquetil had a son together, Christopher, born on 2 April 1986.

=== Illness and death ===
Anquetil was diagnosed with an advanced form of stomach cancer on 25 May 1987. According to both his childhood friend Dieulois and fellow Tour winner Bernard Hinault, Anquetil waited until he received proper treatment, delaying it to fulfill commentating duties over the summer before going to hospital. On 11 August, he had his stomach removed surgically. He died on 18 November 1987, surrounded by Sophie and Dominique, at the Saint Hilaire Clinic in Rouen.

=== Legacy ===
The 1997 Tour de France paid homage to Anquetil, on the 40th anniversary of his first Tour victory and ten years after his death, by having the Grand Départ around Rouen. On the day of the first stage, a ceremony was held at his grave and a pier in Quincampoix was renamed Quai Anquetil.

== Doping ==
Anquetil never hid the fact that he took drugs: in a debate with a government minister on French television, he said only a fool would imagine it was possible to ride Bordeaux–Paris on just water. He and other cyclists had to ride through "the cold, through heat waves, in the rain and in the mountains", and they had the right to treat themselves as they wished, he said, before adding: "Leave me in peace; everybody takes dope." There was implied acceptance of doping right to the top of the state: Charles de Gaulle said: "Doping? What doping? Did he or did he not make them play the Marseillaise [the national anthem] abroad?"

Jacques had the strength – for which he was always criticised – to say out loud what others would only whisper. So, when I asked him 'What have you taken?' he didn't drop his eyes before replying. He had the strength of conviction.

— Pierre Chany on Anquetil

Anquetil argued that professional riders were workers and had the same right to treat their pains, as say, a geography teacher. But the argument found less support as more riders were reported to have died or suffered health problems through drug-related incidents, including the death of Tom Simpson, in the 1967 Tour de France.

However, there was great support in the cyclist community for Anquetil's argument that, if there were to be rules and tests, the tests should be carried out consistently and with dignity. He said it was professional dignity, the right of a champion not to be ridiculed in front of his public, that led to his refusal to take a test in the centre of the Vigorelli track after breaking the world hour record.

The unrecognised time that Anquetil set that day was nevertheless broken by the Belgian rider Ferdinand Bracke. Anquetil was hurt that the French government had never sent him a telegram of congratulations but sent one to Bracke, who was not French. It was a measure of the unacceptability of Anquetil's arguments, as was the way he was quietly dropped from future French teams.

== Major results ==
=== Road ===
1952
3rd Team road race, Olympic Games
8th Amateur road race, UCI Road World Championships
1953
1st Grand Prix des Nations
1st Gran Premio di Lugano
2nd Trofeo Baracchi (with Antonin Rolland)
3rd Circuit de l'Aulne
1954
1st Grand Prix des Nations
1st Gran Premio di Lugano
2nd Critérium des As
2nd Trofeo Baracchi (with Louison Bobet)
5th Road race, UCI Road World Championships
7th Overall Paris–Nice

1st Stage 5

9th Critérium National de la Route
10th Overall Tour de l'Ouest
1955
1st Grand Prix des Nations
3rd Trofeo Baracchi (with André Darrigade)
6th Road race, UCI Road World Championships
9th Overall Tour des Provinces du Sud-Est

1st Stage 6

10th Grand Prix de Cannes
1956
1st Grand Prix des Nations
9th Grand Prix du Midi Libre
1957
1st Overall Tour de France

1st Stage 3a (TTT), 3b, 9, 15b (ITT) & 20 (ITT)

1st Overall Paris–Nice

1st Stage 5a (ITT)

1st Grand Prix des Nations
2nd Genoa–Nice
4th Circuit des Boucles de la Seine
4th Trofeo Baracchi (with André Darrigade)
6th Road race, UCI Road World Championships
7th Critérium National de la Route
10th Paris–Tours
1958
1st Overall Four Days of Dunkirk

1st Stage 4 (ITT)

1st Grand Prix des Nations
1st Gran Premio di Lugano
2nd Trofeo Baracchi (with André Darrigade)
3rd Circuit des Boucles de la Seine
10th Overall Paris–Nice

1st Stage 5a (ITT)

10th Milan–San Remo
1959
1st Overall Four Days of Dunkirk

1st Stage 4 (ITT)

1st Critérium des As
1st Gran Premio di Lugano
1st Stage 5a (ITT) Paris–Nice
2nd Overall Giro d'Italia

1st Stages 2 (ITT) & 19 (ITT)
Held after Stages 2 & 15–20

3rd Overall Tour de France
3rd Gent–Wevelgem
3rd Trofeo Baracchi (with André Darrigade)
5th Critérium National de la Route
9th Road race, UCI Road World Championships
1960
1st Overall Giro d'Italia

1st Stage 9b (ITT) & 14 (ITT)

1st Critérium des As
1st Gran Premio di Lugano
3rd Critérium National de la Route
7th Circuit de l'Aulne
8th Overall Tour de Romandie

1st Stage 4b (ITT)

8th Paris–Roubaix
9th Road race, UCI Road World Championships
1961
1st Overall Tour de France

1st Stages 1b (ITT) & 19 (ITT)
Held after Stage 1b

1st Overall Paris–Nice

1st Stage 6a (ITT)

1st Critérium National de la Route
1st Grand Prix des Nations
1st Gran Premio di Lugano
2nd Overall Giro d'Italia

1st Stage 9 (ITT)
Held after Stages 10–13

3rd Mont Faron Hill Climb
4th Critérium des As
5th Trofeo Baracchi (with Michel Stolker)
6th La Flèche Wallonne
9th Genoa–Nice
10th Overall Tour de Romandie

1st Stage 2b (ITT)

1962
1st Overall Tour de France

1st Stages 8b (ITT) & 20 (ITT)

1st Circuit de l'Aulne
1st Trofeo Baracchi (with Rudi Altig)
1st Stage 3 Tour du Var
4th Manx Trophy
6th Gran Premio di Lugano
9th Critérium des As
1963
1st Overall Tour de France

1st Stage 6b (ITT), 10, 17 & 19 (ITT)

1st Overall Vuelta a España

1st Stage 1b (ITT)

1st Overall Paris–Nice

1st Stage 6a (ITT)

1st Overall Critérium du Dauphiné Libéré

1st Stage 6a (ITT)

1st Overall Critérium National de la Route

1st Stage 3 (ITT)

1st Critérium des As
2nd GP Union Dortmund
2nd Trofeo Baracchi (with Raymond Poulidor)
3rd Road race, National Road Championships
3rd Subida a Arrate
4th Overall Tour du Var

1st Stage 2

6th Overall Paris–Luxembourg
8th Circuit de l'Aulne
1964
1st Overall Tour de France

1st Stage 9, 10b (ITT), 17 (ITT) & 22b (ITT)

1st Overall Giro d'Italia

1st Stage 5 (ITT)

1st Gent–Wevelgem
1st Stage 1 Critérium National de la Route
3rd Critérium des As
6th Overall Paris–Nice

1st Stage 3 (ITT)

7th Road race, UCI Road World Championships
7th Overall Paris–Luxembourg
7th Grand Prix de Cannes
10th Subida a Arrate
1965
1st Overall Paris–Nice

1st Stage 6a (ITT)

1st Overall Critérium du Dauphiné Libéré

1st Stages 3, 5 & 7b (ITT)

1st Overall Critérium National de la Route

1st Stage 3 (ITT)

1st Critérium des As
1st Manx Trophy
1st Mont Faron Hill Climb
1st Bordeaux–Paris
1st Grand Prix des Nations
1st Gran Premio di Lugano
1st Trofeo Baracchi (with Jean Stablinski)
2nd Circuit de l'Aulne
3rd Road race, National Road Championships
3rd Circuit des Boucles de la Seine
4th Overall Giro di Sardegna
5th Overall Escalada a Montjuïc
6th Overall Subida a Arrate
7th Overall Circuit du Provençal
7th Trofeo Laigueglia
8th Overall Ronde van Nederland
8th Giro di Lombardia
10th Tour de l'Hérault
1966
1st Overall Paris–Nice

1st Stage 8a

1st Overall Giro di Sardegna
1st Liège–Bastogne–Liège
1st Grand Prix des Nations
2nd Road race, UCI Road World Championships
2nd Overall Volta a Catalunya

1st Stage 6b

2nd Giro di Campania
3rd Overall Giro d'Italia
3rd Gran Premio di Lugano
4th Overall Escalada a Montjuïc
4th Giro di Lombardia
9th Tour de l'Hérault
1967
1st Overall Volta a Catalunya

1st Stage 7b (ITT)

1st Critérium National de la Route
2nd Tour de l'Hérault
2nd Critérium des As
2nd Trofeo Baracchi (with Bernard Guyot)
3rd Overall Giro d'Italia

Held after Stages 16 & 20

6th Overall Escalada a Montjuïc
7th Overall Giro di Sardegna
7th À travers Lausanne
1968
1st Circuit de l'Aulne
1st Maël-Pestivien
1st Trofeo Baracchi (with Felice Gimondi)
2nd Mont Faron Hill Climb
2nd Baden-Baden (with Rudi Altig)
4th Liège–Bastogne–Liège
5th Critérium des As
9th Overall Escalada a Montjuïc
10th Overall Paris–Nice
1969
1st Overall Tour of the Basque Country
3rd Overall Paris–Nice
4th Overall Critérium du Dauphiné Libéré
7th Genoa–Nice

=== General classification results timeline ===
Grand Tour general classification results
Grand Tour	1953	1954	1955	1956	1957	1958	1959	1960	1961	1962	1963	1964	1965	1966	1967	1968	1969
Vuelta a España	Not held		—	—	—	—	—	—	—	DNF	1	—	—	—	—	—	—
Giro d'Italia	—	—	—	—	—	—	2	1	2	—	—	1	—	3	3	—	—
Tour de France	—	—	—	—	1	DNF	3	—	1	1	1	1	—	DNF	—	—	—
Major stage race general classification results
Major stage race	1953	1954	1955	1956	1957	1958	1959	1960	1961	1962	1963	1964	1965	1966	1967	1968	1969
Paris–Nice	—	7	—	—	1	10	11	DNF	1	DNF	1	6	1	1	16	10	3
Tirreno–Adriatico	Not held													—	—	—	—
Tour of the Basque Country	Not held																1
Tour de Romandie	—	—	—	—	—	—	—	8	10	—	—	—	—	—	—	—	—
Critérium du Dauphiné	—	—	15	—	—	—	—	—	—	12	1	—	1	—	Not held		4
Volta a Catalunya	—	—	—	—	—	—	—	—	—	—	—	—	—	2	1	—	—
Tour de Suisse	—	—	—	—	—	—	—	—	—	—	—	—	—	—	—	—	—

=== Classics results timeline ===
Monuments results timeline
Monument	1953	1954	1955	1956	1957	1958	1959	1960	1961	1962	1963	1964	1965	1966	1967	1968	1969
Milan–San Remo	—	—	—	12	17	10	—	23	—	—	—	—	—	—	—	—	—
Tour of Flanders	—	—	—	—	—	—	—	14	—	—	—	—	—	—	—	—	—
Paris–Roubaix	—	53	15	31	25	14	24	8	60	31	—	—	16	—	—	—	—
Liège–Bastogne–Liège	—	—	—	—	—	—	—	—	—	—	—	—	—	1	—	4	—
Giro di Lombardia	—	—	—	—	23	12	21	34	17	—	—	—	8	4	—	—	—

=== Major championship results timeline ===
	1953	1954	1955	1956	1957	1958	1959	1960	1961	1962	1963	1964	1965	1966	1967	1968	1969
World Championships	—	5	6	—	6	DNF	9	9	13	15	14	7	DNF	2	—	11	40
National Championships	—	—	—	DNF	—	—	—	—	—	—	3	—	3	—	—	—	—

Legend
—	Did not compete
DNF	Did not finish

=== Track ===
1956
2nd Individual pursuit, UCI Track World Championships
1957
1st Six Days of Paris (with André Darrigade and Ferdinando Terruzzi)

=== World records ===
Discipline	Record	Date	Velodrome	Track	Ref
Hour record	46.159 km	29 June 1956	Vigorelli (Milan)	Indoor	
Hour record	~~47.493 km~~	27 September 1967	Vigorelli (Milan)	Indoor	(Note: Anquetil set a record distance in 1967 of 47.493 km but the record was never ratified by the UCI following Anquetil's refusal to take a post race doping control, and on 13 October the UCI voted not to allow the record.)

=== Awards and decorations ===
- BBC Overseas Sports Personality of the Year: 1963
- Knight of the Legion of Honour (France): 1966

== See also ==
- List of doping cases in cycling
- List of Giro d'Italia general classification winners
- List of Grand Tour general classification winners
- List of Tour de France general classification winners
- List of Vuelta a España general classification winners
- Yellow jersey statistics

== Bibliography ==
- Belbin, Giles (2017). Chasing the Rainbow: The Story of Road Cycling's World Championships. London: Aurum Press. ISBN 978-1-78131-631-3.
- Beoutis, Didier (2018). Le duel: Anquetil–Poulidor. Dix ans de confrontation (1960–1969) [The Duel: Anquetil–Poulidor. Ten Years of Confrontation (1960–1969)] (in French). Paris: Mareuil Éditions. ISBN 978-2-37254-084-1.
- Boelsen, Helmut (2007). Die Geschichte der Rad-Weltmeisterschaft: Die WM-Straßenrennen der Profis von 1927 bis heute [The History of the Cycling World Championships: The Professional World Championship Road Races from 1927 to Today] (in German). Bielefeld: Covadonga. ISBN 978-3-93697-333-4.
- Cossins, Peter (2015). The Monuments: The Grit and the Glory of Cycling's Greatest One-Day Races. London/New York: Bloomsbury. ISBN 978-1-40884-683-4.
- Dauncey, Hugh; Hare, Geoff, eds. (2003). The Tour de France 1903–2003: A Century of Sporting Structures, Meanings and Values. Sport in Global Society. London: Frank Cass Publishers. ISBN 0-71468-297-7.
- Fallon, Lucy; Bell, Adrian (2019). Viva la Vuelta! 1935–2018 (3rd ed.). Norwich: Mousehold Press. ISBN 978-1-87473-989-0.
- Fife, Graeme (2000). Tour de France: The History, the Legend, the Riders. Edinburgh: Mainstream Publishing. ISBN 978-1-84018-284-2.
- Fotheringham, William (2003). A Century of Cycling: The Classic Races and Legendary Champions. London: Mitchell Beazley. ISBN 1-84000-654-4.
- Fournel, Paul (2017). Anquetil, Alone: The legend of the controversial Tour de France champion. London: Profile Books. ISBN 978-1-78283-298-0.
- Gallagher, Brendan (2017). Corsa Rosa: A History of the Giro d'Italia. London: Bloomsbury. ISBN 978-1-4729-1880-2.
- Howard, Paul (2008). Sex, Lies and Handlebar Tape: The Remarkable Life of Jacques Anquetil, the First Five-Times Winner of the Tour de France. Edinburgh: Mainstream Publishing. ISBN 978-1-84596-301-9.
- Mallon, Bill; Heijmans, Jeroen (2011). Historical Dictionary of Cycling. Lanham, Maryland: Scarecrow Press. ISBN 978-0-8108-7369-8.
- Maso, Benjo (2010). The Sweat of the Gods: Myths and Legends of Bicycle Racing. Norwich: Mousehold Press. ISBN 978-1-87473-937-1.
- McGann, Bill; McGann, Carol (2006). The Story of the Tour de France: How a Newspaper Promotion Became the Greatest Sporting Event in the World. Volume 1: 1903–1964. Vol. 1. Indianapolis: Dog Ear Publishing. ISBN 978-1-59858-180-5.
- McGann, Bill; McGann, Carol (2008). The Story of the Tour de France: How a Newspaper Promotion Became the Greatest Sporting Event in the World. Volume 2: 1965–2007. Vol. 2. Indianapolis: Dog Ear Publishing. ISBN 978-1-59858-608-4.
- McGann, Bill; McGann, Carol (2011). The Story of the Giro d'Italia: A Year-by-Year History of the Tour of Italy. Volume 1: 1909–1970. Vol. 1. Indianapolis: Dog Ear Publishing. ISBN 978-0-98431-176-7.
- Rendell, Matt (2008). Blazing Saddles: The Cruel and Unusual History of the Tour de France (2nd ed.). London: Quercus Publishing. ISBN 978-1-84724-382-9.
- Sidwells, Chris (2018). The Call of the Road: The History of Cycle Road Racing. London: HarperCollins. ISBN 978-0-00822-077-8.
- Smith, Martin, ed. (2009). The Telegraph Book of the Tour de France. London: Aurum Press. ISBN 978-1-84513-545-4.
- Thompson, Christopher S. (2008). The Tour de France: A Cultural History. Berkeley: University of California Press. ISBN 978-0-52025-630-9.
- Wheatcroft, Geoffrey (2013). Le Tour: A History of the Tour de France. London: Simon & Schuster. ISBN 978-1-4711-2894-3.
- Whittle, Jeremy (2014), "In Search of Panache", in Bacon, Ellis; Birnie, Lionel (eds.), The Cycling Anthology, vol. 5, London: Yellow Jersey Press, pp. 30–44, ISBN 978-0-22409-242-5
- Woodland, Les (2003). The Crooked Path to Victory. San Francisco: Cycle Publishing. ISBN 1-89249-540-6.
- Yates, Richard (2001). Master Jacques: The Enigma of Jacques Anquetil. Norwich, UK: Mousehold Press. ISBN 978-1-874739-18-0.

Preceded by Fausto Coppi	UCI hour record (46.159 km); 29 June 1956 – 19 September 1956	Succeeded by Ercole Baldini
