= 1960 Tour de Romandie =

Race details
- Dates: 12–15 May 1960
- Stages: 4
- Distance: 722 km (449 mi)
- Winning time: 19h 21' 31"

Results
	Winner	Louis Rostollan (FRA)
	Second	Édouard Delberghe (FRA)
	Third	Jos Hoevenaers (BEL)

The 1960 Tour de Romandie was the 14th edition of the Tour de Romandie cycle race and was held from 12 May to 15 May 1960. The race started and finished in Nyon. The race was won by Louis Rostollan.

== General classification ==
Final general classification
Rank	Rider	Time
1	Louis Rostollan (FRA)	19h 21' 31"
2	Édouard Delberghe (FRA)	+ 2' 26"
3	Jos Hoevenaers (BEL)	+ 4' 20"
4	Ezio Pizzoglio (ITA)	+ 10' 53"
5	Attilio Moresi (SUI)	+ 11' 54"
6	Kurt Gimmi (SUI)	+ 13' 54"
7	Angelo Conterno (ITA)	+ 14' 28"
8	Jacques Anquetil (FRA)	+ 15' 04"
9	Romeo Venturelli (ITA)	+ 15' 18"
10	André Darrigade (FRA)	+ 16' 26"
