= 1964 Gent–Wevelgem =

- Official poster of the event

Race details
- Dates: 21 March 1964
- Stages: 1
- Distance: 233 km (145 mi)
- Winning time: 5h 36' 20"

Results
	Winner	Jacques Anquetil (FRA)	(Saint-Raphaël–Gitane–Dunlop)
	Second	Yvo Molenaers (BEL)	(Wiel's–Groene Leeuw)
	Third	Rik Van Looy (BEL)	(Solo–Superia)

The 1964 Gent–Wevelgem was the 26th edition of the Belgian Gent–Wevelgem cycle race and was held on 21 March 1964. The race started in Ghent and finished in Wevelgem. The race was won by Jacques Anquetil of the Saint-Raphaël team.

== General classification ==
Final general classification

Rank	Rider	Team	Time
1	Jacques Anquetil (FRA)	Saint-Raphaël–Gitane–Dunlop	5h 36' 20"
2	Yvo Molenaers (BEL)	Wiel's–Groene Leeuw	+ 0"
3	Rik Van Looy (BEL)	Solo–Superia	+ 0"
4	Benoni Beheyt (BEL)	Wiel's–Groene Leeuw	+ 0"
5	Peter Post (NED)	Flandria–Romeo	+ 0"
6	Jan Janssen (NED)	Pelforth–Sauvage–Lejeune	+ 0"
7	Georges Vandenberghe (BEL)	Flandria–Romeo	+ 0"
8	Joseph Wouters (BEL)	Libertas	+ 0"
9	Noël Foré (BEL)	Flandria–Romeo	+ 0"
10	Lode Troonbeeckx (BEL)	Dr. Mann–Labo	+ 0"
