= André Boucher =

André Boucher (5 May 1910, Bernay, Eure – 27 January 1993, Rouen) was a French moderate professional racing cyclist and a talented coach who trained the Tour de France winner, Jacques Anquetil, and the world champion, Jean Jourden. He is remembered by a memorial in Rouen.

== Death and memorial ==
Boucher died when he was 82, in 1993. Jacky Hardy, a Sotteville rider who became a professional and then worked with the Canadian national team in Europe, said: "He was a great man. He was perhaps more of an administrator than a technician but with what we know now about preparation, we can see that what he did wasn't so far from what we do now."

Boucher is remembered by a memorial at the Antenne roundabout, near the Paradis bend on the old Circuit des Essarts at Rouen. It stands not far from the rue Jacques Anquetil. Inaugurated in June 2006, the plaque reads: "Hommage to André Boucher, 1910-1993, emblematic official and trainer of the Auto-Cycle Sottevillais. He trained numerous champions and gave the club one of the most glorious record of successes of French amateur cycling." The memorial is a stylised face talking or shouting to a passing cyclist.
