= 1969 Paris–Nice =

Race details
- Dates: 10–16 March 1969
- Stages: 7
- Distance: 1,206 km (749.4 mi)
- Winning time: 31h 56' 57"

Results
Jersey awarded to the overall winner	Winner	Eddy Merckx (BEL)	(Faema)
	Second	Raymond Poulidor (FRA)	(Mercier–BP–Hutchinson)
	Third	Jacques Anquetil (FRA)	(Bic)

The 1969 Paris–Nice was the 27th edition of the Paris–Nice cycle race and was held from 10 March to 16 March 1969. The race started in Paris and finished in Nice. The race was won by Eddy Merckx of the Faema team.

== General classification ==
Final general classification

Rank	Rider	Team	Time
1	Eddy Merckx (BEL)	Faema	31h 56' 57"
2	Raymond Poulidor (FRA)	Mercier–BP–Hutchinson	+ 51"
3	Jacques Anquetil (FRA)	Bic	+ 2' 17"
4	Herman Van Springel (BEL)	Dr. Mann–Grundig	+ 3' 40"
5	Raymond Delisle (FRA)	Peugeot–BP–Michelin	+ 4' 27"
6	Jan Janssen (NED)	Bic	+ 4' 51"
7	Gilbert Bellone (FRA)	Bic	+ 4' 57"
8	Rolf Wolfshohl (FRG)	Bic	+ 5' 04"
9	Roger Pingeon (FRA)	Peugeot–BP–Michelin	+ 5' 56"
10	Alain Vasseur (FRA)	Bic	+ 6' 17"
