= 1967 Volta a Catalunya =

Race details
- Dates: 6–13 September 1967
- Stages: 8
- Distance: 1,405 km (873.0 mi)
- Winning time: 37h 06' 25"

Results
	Winner	Jacques Anquetil (FRA)
	Second	Antonio Gómez del Moral (ESP)
	Third	Robert Hagmann (SUI)

The 1967 Volta a Catalunya was the 47th edition of the Volta a Catalunya cycle race and was held from 6 September to 13 September 1967. The race started in Terrassa and finished in Castelldefels. The race was won by Jacques Anquetil.

== General classification ==
Final general classification

Rank	Rider	Time
1	Jacques Anquetil (FRA)	37h 06' 25"
2	Antonio Gómez del Moral (ESP)	+ 37"
3	Robert Hagmann (SUI)	+ 1' 16"
4	Ginés García Perán (ESP)	+ 1' 38"
5	José Manuel Lasa (ESP)	+ 1' 55"
6	José Pérez Francés (ESP)	+ 2' 11"
7	Gregorio San Miguel (ESP)	+ 2' 23"
8	Bernard Guyot (FRA)	+ 2' 33"
9	Willy Van Neste (BEL)	+ 2' 52"
10	Bernard Van de Kerckhove (BEL)	+ 3' 16"
