= 1965 Critérium du Dauphiné Libéré =

Race details
- Dates: 22–29 May 1965
- Stages: 8
- Distance: 1,565 km (972 mi)
- Winning time: 42h 04' 36"

Results
	Winner	Jacques Anquetil (FRA)	(Ford France–Gitane)
	Second	Raymond Poulidor (FRA)	(Mercier–BP–Hutchinson)
	Third	Karl-Heinz Kunde (FRG)	(Wiel's–Groene Leeuw)
Jersey awarded to the points classification winner	Points	Jan Janssen (NED)	(Pelforth–Sauvage–Lejeune)
Jersey awarded to the mountains classification winner	Mountains	Angelino Soler (ESP)	(Peugeot–BP–Michelin)
	Team	Ferrys	

The 1965 Critérium du Dauphiné Libéré was the 18th edition of a cycle race. It was from 22 May to 29 May 1965. The race started in Mâcon and then finished in Avignon. The race was won by Jacques Anquetil of the Ford France–Gitane team, Raymond Poulidor was second, and Karl-Heinz Kunde was third.

== General classification ==
Final general classification

Rank	Rider	Team	Time
1	Jacques Anquetil (FRA)	Ford France–Gitane	42h 04' 36"
2	Raymond Poulidor (FRA)	Mercier–BP–Hutchinson	+ 1' 43"
3	Karl-Heinz Kunde (FRG)	Wiel's–Groene Leeuw	+ 5' 58"
4	Lucien Aimar (FRA)	Ford France–Gitane	+ 8' 53"
5	Roger Pingeon (FRA)	Peugeot–BP–Michelin	+ 10' 23"
6	Fernando Manzaneque (ESP)	Ferrys	+ 11' 16"
7	Eduardo Castelló (ESP)	Ferrys	+ 13' 25"
8	Ginés García (ESP)	Margnat–Paloma–Inuri–Dunlop	+ 14' 15"
9	André Foucher (FRA)	Pelforth–Sauvage–Lejeune	+ 15' 49"
10	Raymond Mastrotto (FRA)	Margnat–Paloma–Inuri–Dunlop	+ 16' 32"
