= 1963 Paris–Nice =

Cycling race in France

Race details
- Dates: 10–17 March 1963
- Stages: 8
- Distance: 1,389.2 km (863.2 mi)
- Winning time: 37h 13' 29"

Results
| Jersey awarded to the overall winner | Winner | Jacques Anquetil (FRA) | (Saint-Raphaël–Gitane–R. Geminiani) |
| | Second | Rudi Altig (FRG) | (Saint-Raphaël–Gitane–R. Geminiani) |
| | Third | Rik Van Looy (BEL) | (G.B.C.–Libertas) |

The 1963 Paris–Nice was the 21st edition of the Paris–Nice cycle race and was held from 10 March to 17 March 1963. The race started in Paris and finished in Nice. The race was won by Jacques Anquetil of the Saint-Raphaël team.

== General classification ==
Final general classification

| Rank | Rider | Team | Time |
|---|---|---|---|
| 1 | Jacques Anquetil (FRA) | Saint-Raphaël–Gitane–R. Geminiani | 37h 13' 29" |
| 2 | Rudi Altig (FRG) | Saint-Raphaël–Gitane–R. Geminiani | + 53" |
| 3 | Rik Van Looy (BEL) | G.B.C.–Libertas | + 3' 04" |
| 4 | Henry Anglade (FRA) | Pelforth–Sauvage–Lejeune | + 3' 31" |
| 5 | Joseph Groussard (FRA) | Pelforth–Sauvage–Lejeune | + 3' 38" |
| 6 | Luis Otaño (ESP) | Margnat–Paloma–Dunlop | + 4' 31" |
| 7 | Jean Stablinski (FRA) | Saint-Raphaël–Gitane–R. Geminiani | + 4' 43" |
| 8 | Hans Junkermann (FRG) | Wiel's–Groene Leeuw | + 6' 05" |
| 9 | Huub Zilverberg (NED) | G.B.C.–Libertas | + 7' 22" |
| 10 | Vin Denson (GBR) | Pelforth–Sauvage–Lejeune | + 9' 23" |
