= 1965 Paris–Nice =

Race details
- Dates: 9–16 March 1965
- Stages: 8
- Distance: 1,299.2 km (807.3 mi)
- Winning time: 36h 14' 09"

Results
Jersey awarded to the overall winner	Winner	Jacques Anquetil (FRA)	(Ford France–Gitane)
	Second	Rudi Altig (FRG)	(Margnat–Paloma–Inuri–Dunlop)
	Third	Italo Zilioli (ITA)	(Sanson)

The 1965 Paris–Nice was the 23rd edition of the Paris–Nice cycle race and was held from 9 March to 16 March 1965. The race started in Paris and finished in Nice. The race was won by Jacques Anquetil of the Ford France team.

== General classification ==
Final general classification

Rank	Rider	Team	Time
1	Jacques Anquetil (FRA)	Ford France–Gitane	36h 14' 09"
2	Rudi Altig (FRG)	Margnat–Paloma–Inuri–Dunlop	+ 2' 18"
3	Italo Zilioli (ITA)	Sanson	+ 2' 56"
4	Raymond Poulidor (FRA)	Mercier–BP–Hutchinson	+ 3' 51"
5	Jan Janssen (NED)	Pelforth–Sauvage–Lejeune	+ 4' 10"
6	Arie den Hartog (NED)	Ford France–Gitane	+ 4' 19"
7	Hans Junkermann (FRG)	Margnat–Paloma–Inuri–Dunlop	+ 4' 57"
8	Gianni Motta (ITA)	Molteni	+ 5' 13"
9	Michel Nédélec (FRA)	Peugeot–BP–Michelin	+ 6' 24"
10	Cees Haast (NED)	Televizier	+ 6' 58"
