= 1969 Tour of the Basque Country =

Race details
- Dates: 16–20 April 1969
- Stages: 5
- Distance: 891 km (554 mi)
- Winning time: 25h 22' 05"

Results
	Winner	Jacques Anquetil (FRA)	(Bic)
	Second	Francisco Gabica (ESP)	(Fagor)
	Third	Mariano Díaz (ESP)	(Fagor)

The 1969 Tour of the Basque Country was the ninth edition of the Tour of the Basque Country cycle race and was held from 16 April to 20 April 1969. The race started and finished in Eibar. The race was won by Jacques Anquetil of the Bic team.

== General classification ==
Final general classification

Rank	Rider	Team	Time
1	Jacques Anquetil (FRA)	Bic	25h 22' 05"
2	Francisco Gabica (ESP)	Fagor	+ 32"
3	Mariano Díaz (ESP)	Fagor	+ 40"
4	Gregorio San Miguel (ESP)	Kas–Kaskol	+ 1' 06"
5	Eduardo Castelló (ESP)	Kas–Kaskol	+ 2' 57"
6	Luis Ocaña (ESP)	Fagor	+ 3' 59"
7	Raymond Poulidor (FRA)	Mercier–BP–Hutchinson	+ 4' 08"
8	Joaquim Galera (ESP)	Fagor	+ 4' 19"
9	Domingo Perurena (ESP)	Fagor	+ 6' 59"
10	Eusebio Vélez (ESP)	Fagor	+ 8' 32"
