= 1957 Paris–Nice =

Race details
- Dates: 12–17 March 1957
- Stages: 6
- Distance: 1,206 km (749.4 mi)
- Winning time: 30h 19' 26"

Results
Jersey awarded to the overall winner	Winner	Jacques Anquetil (FRA)	(Helyett–Potin)
	Second	Désiré Keteleer (BEL)	(Carpano–Coppi)
	Third	Jean Brankart (BEL)	(Peugeot–BP–Dunlop)

The 1957 Paris–Nice was the 15th edition of the Paris–Nice cycle race and was held from 12 March to 17 March 1957. The race started in Paris and finished in Nice. The race was won by Jacques Anquetil of the Helyett team.

== General classification ==
Final general classification

Rank	Rider	Team	Time
1	Jacques Anquetil (FRA)	Helyett–Potin	30h 19' 26"
2	Désiré Keteleer (BEL)	Carpano–Coppi	+ 23"
3	Jean Brankart (BEL)	Peugeot–BP–Dunlop	+ 55"
4	Jef Planckaert (BEL)	Peugeot–BP–Dunlop	+ 1' 01"
5	Louison Bobet (FRA)	Bobet–BP–Hutchinson	+ 1' 24"
6	Jean Forestier (FRA)	Helyett–Potin	+ 2' 11"
7	Ernest Heyvaert (BEL)	Carpano–Coppi	+ 3' 02"
8	Brian Robinson (GBR)	Saint-Raphaël–R. Geminiani–Dunlop	+ 3' 08"
9	Jacques Dupont (FRA)	Saint-Raphaël–R. Geminiani–Dunlop	+ 3' 24"
10	Jean Bobet (FRA)	Bobet–BP–Hutchinson	+ 3' 36"
