= 1966 Volta a Catalunya =

Race details
- Dates: 11–18 September 1966
- Stages: 8
- Distance: 1,299 km (807.2 mi)
- Winning time: 35h 47' 04"

Results
	Winner	Arie den Hartog (NED)
	Second	Jacques Anquetil (FRA)
	Third	Paul Gutty (FRA)

The 1966 Volta a Catalunya was the 46th edition of the Volta a Catalunya cycle race and was held from 11 September to 18 September 1966. The race started in Sabadell and finished in Barcelona. The race was won by Arie den Hartog.

== General classification ==
Final general classification

Rank	Rider	Time
1	Arie den Hartog (NED)	35h 47' 04"
2	Jacques Anquetil (FRA)	+ 1' 23"
3	Paul Gutty (FRA)	+ 2' 07"
4	Vicente López Carril (ESP)	+ 2' 17"
5	Ginés García Perán (ESP)	+ 2' 29"
6	Antonio Gómez del Moral (ESP)	+ 2' 48"
7	Joaquim Galera (ESP)	+ 2' 53"
8	Jaime Alomar (ESP)	+ 3' 11"
9	José Pérez Francés (ESP)	+ 3' 18"
10	Mariano Díaz (ESP)	+ 3' 55"
