= 1959 Paris–Nice =

1959 Paris–Nice–Rome
Race details
- Dates: 4–14 March 1959
- Stages: 11
- Distance: 2,044.5 km (1,270 mi)
- Winning time: 53h 36' 04"

Results
Jersey awarded to the overall winner	Winner	Jean Graczyk (FRA)	(Helyett–Leroux–Fynsec–Hutchinson)
	Second	Gérard Saint (FRA)	(Saint-Raphaël–R. Geminiani–Dunlop)
	Third	Pierino Baffi (ITA)	(Ignis–Frejus)

The 1959 Paris–Nice–Rome was the 17th edition of the Paris–Nice cycle race and was held from 4 March to 14 March 1959. The race started in Paris and finished in Rome. It was the only time the race covered this route from Nice to Rome. The race was won by Jean Graczyk of the Helyett team.

== General classification ==
Final general classification

Rank	Rider	Team	Time
1	Jean Graczyk (FRA)	Helyett–Leroux–Fynsec–Hutchinson	53h 36' 04"
2	Gérard Saint (FRA)	Saint-Raphaël–R. Geminiani–Dunlop	+ 15"
3	Pierino Baffi (ITA)	Ignis–Frejus	+ 4' 15"
4	Henry Anglade (FRA)	Liberia–Hutchinson	+ 4' 44"
5	Pierre Everaert (FRA)	Saint-Raphaël–R. Geminiani–Dunlop	+ 5' 13"
6	Gastone Nencini (ITA)	Carpano	+ 5' 50"
7	Roger Rivière (FRA)	Saint-Raphaël–R. Geminiani–Dunlop	+ 6' 24"
8	Nicolas Barone (FRA)	Saint-Raphaël–R. Geminiani–Dunlop	+ 6' 26"
9	Michel Van Aerde (BEL)	Carpano	+ 8' 10"
10	Jean Dotto (FRA)	Liberia–Hutchinson	+ 9' 32"
