= Louis Rostollan =

French cyclist (1936–2020)

Personal information
- Full name: Louis Rostollan
- Born: 1 January 1936 Marseille, France
- Died: 13 November 2020 (aged 84) Marseille, France

Cycling career
- Sport: Cycling
- Discipline: Road
- Role: Rider

Major wins
- Critérium du Dauphiné Libéré (1958); Tour de Romandie (1960, 1961)

Louis Rostollan (1 January 1936 – 13 November 2020) was a French professional road bicycle racer.

He was a professional from 1958 until 1967, winning the Critérium du Dauphiné Libéré in 1958 and the Tour de Romandie in 1960 and 1961.

Rostollan died on 13 November 2020 of a lung disease at the age of 84.

== Major results ==
1957
2nd, Overall, Tour du Sud-Est

3rd, Stage 5

Critérium du Dauphiné Libéré

1st, Stage 8b
1st, Stage 4

1958
1st, Overall, Critérium du Dauphiné Libéré

3rd, Stage 4

1959
1st, Cluny

1960
1st, Boucles Roquevairoises
1st, Overall, Tour de Romandie

3rd, Stage 1
3rd, Stage 4b

2nd, France National Road Championships

1961
1st, Overall, Tour de Champagne
1st, Overall, Tour de Romandie

1st, Stage 3

1st, Vergt

1962
1st, Polymultipliée

1964
1st, Circuit d'Auvergne

1965
1st, Circuit des Boucles de la Seine
