= Ruban Jaune =

Cycling title created in 1936 by Henri Desgrange

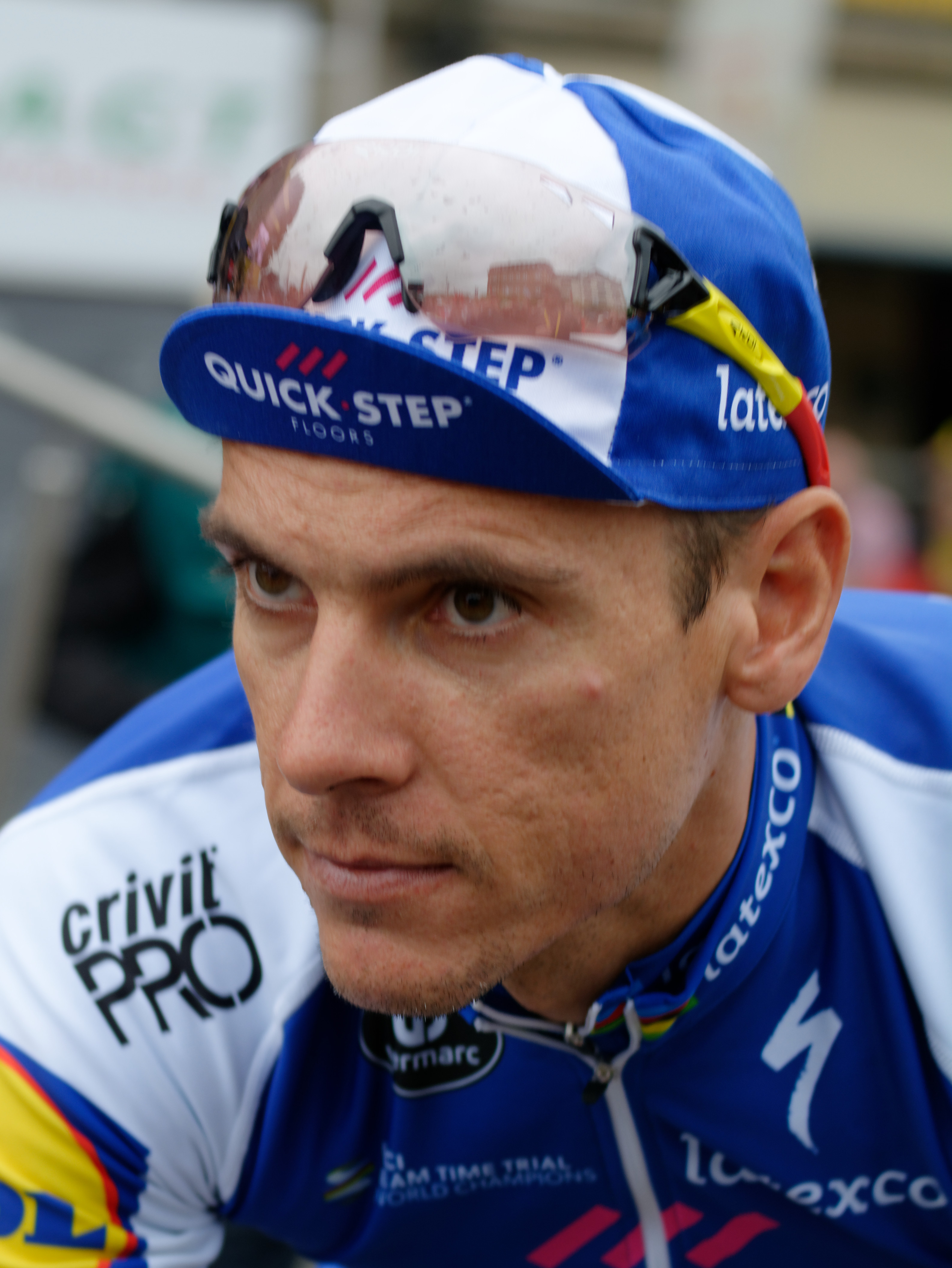
Philippe Gilbert (pictured in 2017) is the current holder of the Ruban Jaune, having won stage 17 of the 2019 Vuelta a España at an average speed of 50.63 km/h (31.46 mph).

The Ruban Jaune (English; Yellow Ribbon) is a cycling title created in 1936 by Henri Desgrange, awarded to the rider recording the fastest average speed in a professional cycling race or stage longer than 200 km. The name is thought to have come from comparison with the Blue Riband accolade awarded to the passenger liner crossing the Atlantic Ocean in record time. Desgrange changed the colour to yellow to reflect the newsprint of L'Auto, the sports newspaper he edited. The current holder of the Ruban Jaune is Philippe Gilbert.

== History ==
The first holder of the Ruban Jaune was Gustave Danneels of Belgium, who won the 1936 Paris–Tours in 41.455 km/h. Paris–Tours was long associated with the Ruban Jaune because its flat course, often coupled with a tailwind, makes for a fast speed; changes to the course from 2018, introducing gravel sections and hills in the latter stages, make it less favourable now. Jules Rossi of Italy took the record in 1938 when covering 251 km at an average of 42.1 km/h in Paris–Tours.

The suspension of professional cycling during World War II meant Rossi’s record stood for ten years until April 4, 1948, when Rik Van Steenbergen won Paris–Roubaix with an average speed of 43.6 km/h. The race had a violent tailwind. Van Steenbergen attacked at Hem 6 km from the finish, caught Emile Idée and Fiorenzo Magni and then beat Idée in a sprint in Roubaix Velodrome. In 1955 the record returned to Paris–Tours when Jacques Dupont covered the 253.7 km with an average speed of 43.8 km/h.

Dupont held the record until 1962 when Jo de Roo won Paris–Tours with an average speed of 44.9 km/h over 267.5 km. However, the previous year saw two unratified claims. Jean Anastasi won a 218 km stage of the 1961 Paris–Nice between St Etienne and Avignon with an average speed of 44.9 km/h. The record was not recognised because the course had not been properly measured. Also in 1961 Walter Martin of Italy won Milano–Torino with an average speed of 45.1 km/h but this too was not accepted.

In 1964 Peter Post claimed the Ruban Jaune in winning Paris–Roubaix with an average speed of 45.1 km/h. The race took off very fast. The high average speed can be further explained by the final break at Attiches 33 km from the finish. It contained two riders from the Flandria team and three from Weils-Groene-Leeuw and they worked together to keep a high speed with the race decided in a sprint. Post’s record stood for more than a decade although the 1969 Milano–Vignola was initially won by Roger Kindt with a record average speed of 46 km/h before he was disqualified at the medical control and victory was awarded to Attilio Rota. Post’s record was beaten by Freddy Maertens in the 1975 Paris-Brussels, with an average speed of 46.1 km/h over 285.5 km.

Maertens held the record for more than 20 years, before Andrei Tchmil set a record in 1997 when he won the 254.5 km Paris–Tours with an average speed of 47.2 km/h. The race covered 49.3 km in the first hour and 48.9 km in the second. Tchmil beat Max Sciandri in a sprint after the two had broken away 5 km from the finish. Erik Zabel set a new best in the 2003 Paris–Tours of 47.6 km/h over 257 km, a brisk tailwind pushing the race over 51 km in the fourth hour along the Loire valley. Zabel eventually won the race in a bunch sprint in Tours. On October 10, 2010 Óscar Freire broke the record yet again in Paris–Tours, taking advantage of a favourable wind over a new shortened course of 233 km, he covered the distance in 4 hours 52 mins 54 seconds at an average speed of 47.7 km/h. Two Italian riders then took the title at further editions of Paris–Tours: Marco Marcato in 2012 and Matteo Trentin in 2015, with an average speed of 49.6 km/h (30.8 mph). Philippe Gilbert is the current holder of the honour, after winning stage 17 of the 2019 Vuelta a España at an average speed of 50.6 km/h (31.4 mph). That stage saw the peloton breaking up into echelons in the first part of the course, with various parts of the peloton chasing after each other. A strong tailwind in the second part ensured that the high pace was maintained until the finish in Guadalajara.

== Holders of the Ruban Jaune ==
Year	Rider	Nationality	Race	Km / Hour	Distance
1936	Gustave Danneels	Belgium	Paris–Tours	41.46	251 km
1938	Jules Rossi	Italy	Paris–Tours	42.09	251 km
1948	Rik Van Steenbergen	Belgium	Paris–Roubaix	43.61	246 km
1955	Jacques Dupont	France	Paris–Tours	43.67	253 km
1962	Jo de Roo	Netherlands	Paris–Tours	44.9	267.5 km
1964	Peter Post	Netherlands	Paris–Roubaix	45.13	265 km
1975	Freddy Maertens	Belgium	Paris–Brussels	46.11	285.5 km
1997	Andrei Tchmil	Ukraine	Paris–Tours	47.17	254.5 km
2003	Erik Zabel	Germany	Paris–Tours	47.55	257.5 km
2010	Óscar Freire	Spain	Paris–Tours	47.73	233 km
2012	Marco Marcato	Italy	Paris–Tours	48.63	235.5 km
2015	Matteo Trentin	Italy	Paris–Tours	49.64	231 km
2019	Philippe Gilbert	Belgium	Vuelta a España (Stage 17)	50.63	219.6 km
