= 1943 Paris–Tours =

Race details
- Dates: 30 May 1943
- Stages: 1
- Distance: 241 km (149.8 mi)
- Winning time: 6h 27' 24"

Results
	Winner	Gabriel Gaudin (FRA)
	Second	Achiel Buysse (BEL)
	Third	Albert Hendrickx (BEL)

The 1943 Paris–Tours was the 37th edition of the Paris–Tours cycle race and was held on 30 May 1943. The race started in Paris and finished in Tours. The race was won by Gabriel Gaudin.

== General classification ==
Final general classification

Rank	Rider	Time
1	Gabriel Gaudin (FRA)	6h 27' 24"
2	Achiel Buysse (BEL)	+ 0"
3	Albert Hendrickx (BEL)	+ 0"
4	André Denhez (FRA)	+ 0"
5	Gustave Danneels (BEL)	+ 28"
6	Paul Maye (FRA)	+ 2' 11"
7	Joseph Goutorbe (FRA)	+ 2' 11"
8	Marcel Kint (BEL)	+ 2' 11"
9	Désiré Keteleer (BEL)	+ 2' 11"
10	Fernand Mithouard (FRA)	+ 2' 11"
