= 1962 Super Prestige Pernod =

- Fourth edition of the Super Prestige Pernod

Details
- Dates: 4 March – 28 October
- Location: Europe
- Races: 19

Champions
- Individual champion: Jo de Roo (NED) (Saint-Raphaël–Helyett–Hutchinson)

The 1962 Super Prestige Pernod was the fourth edition of the Super Prestige Pernod, a season-long competition for road bicycle racing. It included nineteen races in Europe. Dutchman Jo de Roo of the Saint-Raphaël–Helyett–Hutchinson team won the overall title.

== Races ==
1962 Super Prestige Pernod races
Date	Race	Country	Winner	Team	Report
4 March	Genoa–Nice	Italy	Antonio Bailetti (ITA)	Carpano	Report
9–17 March	Paris–Nice	France	Jef Planckaert (BEL)	Flandria–Faema–Clément	Report
19 March	Milan–San Remo	Italy	Emile Daems (BEL)	Philco	Report
29 March	Giro di Campania	Italy	Silvano Ciampi (ITA)	Philco	Report
1 April	Tour of Flanders	Belgium	Rik Van Looy (BEL)	Flandria–Faema–Clément	Report
8 April	Paris–Roubaix	France	Rik Van Looy (BEL)	Flandria–Faema–Clément	Report
27 April – 13 May	Vuelta a España	Spain	Rudi Altig (FRG)	Saint-Raphaël–Helyett–Hutchinson	Report
29 April	Paris–Brussels	France/Belgium	Joseph Wouters (BEL)	Solo–Van Steenbergen	Report
1 May	Grand Prix Stan Ockers	France	Joseph Velly (FRA)	Margnat–Paloma–D'Alessandro	Report
7 May	La Flèche Wallonne	Belgium	Henri De Wolf (BEL)	Gitane–Leroux–Dunlop–R. Geminiani	Report
10–13 May	Tour de Romandie	Switzerland	Guido De Rosso (ITA)	Molteni	Report
19 May – 9 June	Giro d'Italia	Italy	Franco Balmamion (ITA)	Carpano	Report
27 May	Bordeaux–Paris	France	Jo de Roo (NED)	Saint-Raphaël–Helyett–Hutchinson	Report
28 May – 3 June	Critérium du Dauphiné Libéré	France	Raymond Mastrotto (FRA)	Gitane–Leroux–Dunlop–R. Geminiani	Report
24 June – 15 July	Tour de France	France	Jacques Anquetil (FRA)	Saint-Raphaël–Helyett–Hutchinson	Report
2 September	World Championships	—	Jean Stablinski (FRA)	Saint-Raphaël–Helyett–Hutchinson	Report
16 September	Grand Prix des Nations	France	Ferdinand Bracke (BEL)	Peugeot–BP–Dunlop	Report
7 October	Paris–Tours	France	Jo de Roo (NED)	Saint-Raphaël–Helyett–Hutchinson	Report
20 October	Giro di Lombardia	Italy	Jo de Roo (NED)	Saint-Raphaël–Helyett–Hutchinson	Report

== Final standings ==
1962 Super Prestige Pernod final standings (1–10)
Rank	Cyclist	Team	Points
1	Jo de Roo (NED)	Saint-Raphaël–Helyett–Hutchinson	170
2	Jef Planckaert (BEL)	Flandria–Faema–Clément	148
3	Emile Daems (BEL)	Philco	120
4	Rik Van Looy (BEL)	Flandria–Faema–Clément	110
5	Jacques Anquetil (FRA)	Saint-Raphaël–Helyett–Hutchinson	90
6	Imerio Massignan (ITA)	Legnano–Pirelli	80
7	Raymond Poulidor (FRA)	Mercier–BP–Hutchinson	75
8	Jean Stablinski (FRA)	Saint-Raphaël–Helyett–Hutchinson	70
8	Seamus Elliott (IRE)	Saint-Raphaël–Helyett–Hutchinson	70
8	Franco Balmamion (ITA)	Carpano	70
