= 1942 Paris–Tours =

Race details
- Dates: 31 May 1942
- Stages: 1
- Distance: 248 km (154.1 mi)
- Winning time: 6h 41' 24"

Results
	Winner	Paul Maye (FRA)
	Second	Gérard Virol (FRA)
	Third	Jules Rossi (ITA)

The 1942 Paris–Tours was the 36th edition of the Paris–Tours cycle race and was held on 31 May 1942. The race started in Paris and finished in Tours. The race was won by Paul Maye.

== General classification ==
Final general classification

Rank	Rider	Time
1	Paul Maye (FRA)	6h 41' 24"
2	Gérard Virol (FRA)	+ 0"
3	Jules Rossi (ITA)	+ 0"
4	Domenico Pedrali (ITA)	+ 0"
5	Georges Claes (BEL)	+ 0"
6	Robert Van Eenaeme (BEL)	+ 0"
7	Robert Panier (FRA)	+ 0"
8	Gustaaf Van Overloop (BEL)	+ 0"
9	André Deforge (FRA)	+ 0"
10	Louis Gauthier (FRA)	+ 0"
