= 1928 Paris–Tours =

Race details
- Dates: 22 April 1928
- Stages: 1
- Distance: 253 km (157.2 mi)
- Winning time: 7h 16' 53"

Results
	Winner	Denis Verschueren (BEL)
	Second	Charles Pélissier (FRA)
	Third	Marius Gallottini (FRA)

The 1928 Paris–Tours was the 23rd edition of the Paris–Tours cycle race and was held on 22 April 1928. The race started in Paris and finished in Tours. The race was won by Denis Verschueren.

== General classification ==
Final general classification

Rank	Rider	Time
1	Denis Verschueren (BEL)	7h 16' 53"
2	Charles Pélissier (FRA)	+ 0"
3	Marius Gallottini (FRA)	+ 0"
4	Achille Souchard (FRA)	+ 0"
5	Georges Cuvelier (FRA)	+ 0"
6	Joseph Dervaes (BEL)	+ 0"
7	Joseph Wauters (BEL)	+ 0"
8	Charles Meunier (BEL)	+ 0"
9	Nicolas Frantz (LUX)	+ 0"
10	Marcel Bidot (FRA)	+ 0"
