= Cerato =

Cerato may refer to:

== People ==
- Alcide Cerato (1939–2026), Italian professional road cyclist and businessman
- Amy Cerato, American geotechnical engineer

== Other uses ==
- Kia Cerato, a compact car produced by the South Korean automaker Kia Motors
- Ceratostigma, is a genus of eight species of flowering plants in the family Plumbaginaceae
