= 1925 Paris–Tours =

Race details
- Dates: 3 May 1925
- Stages: 1
- Distance: 342 km (212.5 mi)
- Winning time: 12h 27' 00"

Results
	Winner	Denis Verschueren (BEL)
	Second	August Mortelmans (BEL)
	Third	Jean Hillarion (FRA)

The 1925 Paris–Tours was the 20th edition of the Paris–Tours cycle race and was held on 3 May 1925. The race started in Paris and finished in Tours. The race was won by Denis Verschueren.

== General classification ==
Final general classification

Rank	Rider	Time
1	Denis Verschueren (BEL)	12h 27' 00"
2	August Mortelmans (BEL)	+ 0"
3	Jean Hillarion (FRA)	+ 0"
4	Heiri Suter (SUI)	+ 2' 30"
5	Jean Rossius (BEL)	+ 2' 30"
6	Alfonso Piccin (ITA)	+ 2' 30"
7	Marcel Colleu (FRA)	+ 2' 30"
8	Marcel Buysse (BEL)	+ 2' 30"
9	Aimé Dossche (BEL)	+ 2' 30"
10	Omer Vermeulen (BEL)	+ 2' 30"
