= 1951 Paris–Tours =

Race details
- Dates: 7 October 1951
- Stages: 1
- Distance: 251 km (156.0 mi)
- Winning time: 5h 58' 54"

Results
	Winner	Jacques Dupont (FRA)
	Second	Alfredo Martini (ITA)
	Third	Attilio Redolfi (FRA)

The 1951 Paris–Tours was the 45th edition of the Paris–Tours cycle race and was held on 7 October 1951. The race started in Paris and finished in Tours. The race was won by Jacques Dupont.

== General classification ==
Final general classification

Rank	Rider	Time
1	Jacques Dupont (FRA)	5h 58' 54"
2	Alfredo Martini (ITA)	+ 0"
3	Attilio Redolfi (FRA)	+ 0"
4	Roger Chupin (FRA)	+ 0"
5	Maurice Blomme (BEL)	+ 0"
6	René Walschot (BEL)	+ 0"
7	Jacques Renaud (FRA)	+ 0"
8	Guy Lintilhac (FRA)	+ 0"
9	Dominique Canavese (FRA)	+ 0"
10	Dominique Forlini (FRA)	+ 24"
