= 1937 Paris–Roubaix =

Cycling race

Race details
- Dates: 28 March 1937
- Stages: 1
- Distance: 255 km (158.4 mi)
- Winning time: 7h 17' 57"

Results
	Winner	Jules Rossi (ITA)
	Second	Albert Hendrickx (BEL)
	Third	Noël Declercq (BEL)

The 1937 Paris–Roubaix was the 38th edition of the Paris–Roubaix, a classic one-day cycle race in France. The single day event was held on 28 March 1937 and stretched 255 km (158 mi) from Paris to its end in a velodrome in Roubaix. The winner was Jules Rossi from Italy.

== Results ==
Final results (1–10)
Rank	Cyclist	Time
1	Jules Rossi (ITA)	7h 17' 57″
2	Albert Hendrickx (BEL)	+0' 00″
3	Noël Declercq (BEL)	+0' 00″
4	Emiel Vandepitte (BEL)	+0' 00″
5	Aimé Lievens (BEL)	+0' 00″
6	Gustave Danneels (BEL)	+1' 03″
7	Edgard De Caluwé (BEL)	+1' 03″
8	Frans Bonduel (BEL)	+1' 03″
9	Severin Vergili (FRA)	+1' 03″
10	Georges Speicher (FRA)	+1' 03″
