= Noël Vantyghem =

Belgian cyclist

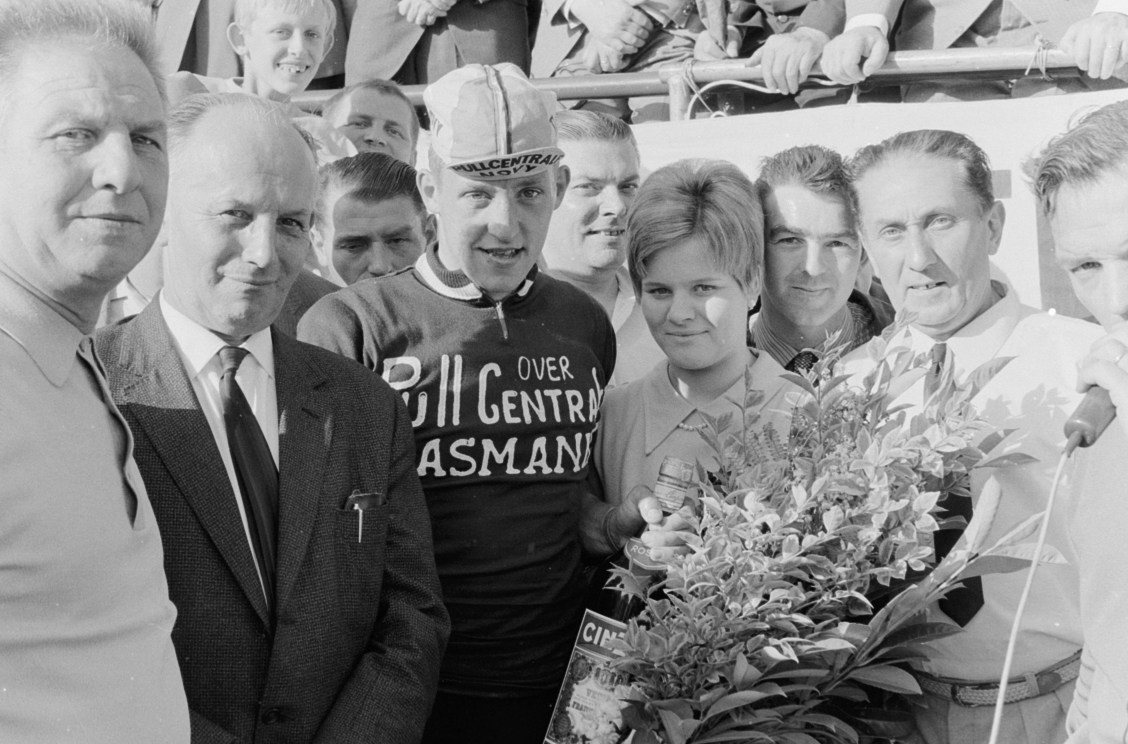
- Vantyghem after winning 1969 Gullegem Koerse

Personal information
- Born: 9 October 1947 Ypres, Belgium
- Died: 10 June 1994 (aged 46) De Panne, Belgium

Cycling career
- Sport: Cycling
- Discipline: Road
- Role: Rider
- Rider type: Classics specialist

Professional teams
- 1969: Pull Over Centrale–Tasmania
- 1970–1971: Hertekamp–Magniflex
- 1972: Novy–Dubble Bubble
- 1973: Flandria–Carpenter
- 1974: Merlin Plage–Shimano–Flandria
- 1975: Alsaver–Jeunet–de Gribaldy

Major wins
- Paris–Tours (1972)

Noël Vantyghem (9 October 1947 – 10 June 1994) was a Belgian professional cyclist.

Vantyghem's biggest win was the 1972 Paris–Tours. Later, he remarked "Together with Eddy Merckx, I won all classics races that could be won. I won Paris–Tours, he the rest."

== Major results ==
1968
1st National Amateur Road Race Championships
1st Stage 2 Peace Race
2nd Overall Tour of Greece

1st Stage 2

1969
1st Gullegem Koerse
2nd GP Isbergues
2nd Kuurne–Brussels–Kuurne
1970
1st Grand Prix de Fourmies
1st Circuit des Frontières
2nd Schaal Sels
2nd De Kustpijl
1971
1st Stage 2 Tour d'Indre-et-Loire
3rd Omloop Het Volk
1972
1st Paris–Tours
1st Circuit des Frontières
1st Schaal Sels
1st Stage 2 Four Days of Dunkirk
2nd Dwars door Vlaanderen
2nd Grote Prijs Stad Zottegem
3rd De Kustpijl
3rd Dwars door West–Vlaanderen
3rd Rund um den Henninger Turm
3rd Grand Prix de Fourmies
9th Omloop Het Volk
1973
1st Nokere Koerse
4th Omloop Het Volk
