= Gabriel Gaudin =

French bicycle racer

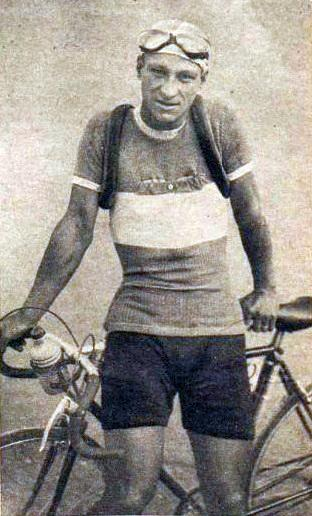
- Gaudin in 1943

Personal information
- Born: 24 August 1919 Les Epesses, France
- Died: 28 April 1999 (aged 79) La Roche-sur-Yon, France

Cycling career
- Sport: Cycling
- Discipline: Road
- Role: Rider

Professional teams
- 1943–1946: Peugeot–Dunlop
- 1947–1948: Stella–Hutchinson
- 1949–1956: Gitane–Hutchinson

Gabriel Gaudin (1919 - 1999) was a French cyclist who won Paris–Tours in 1943.

== Major results ==
1943
1st Paris–Tours
1st Paris-Nantes
1945
2nd Paris-Caen
1949
6th Critérium National de la Route
1950
6th Bordeaux–Paris
1952
2nd Bordeaux-Saintes
