= Jo de Roo =

Dutch cyclist

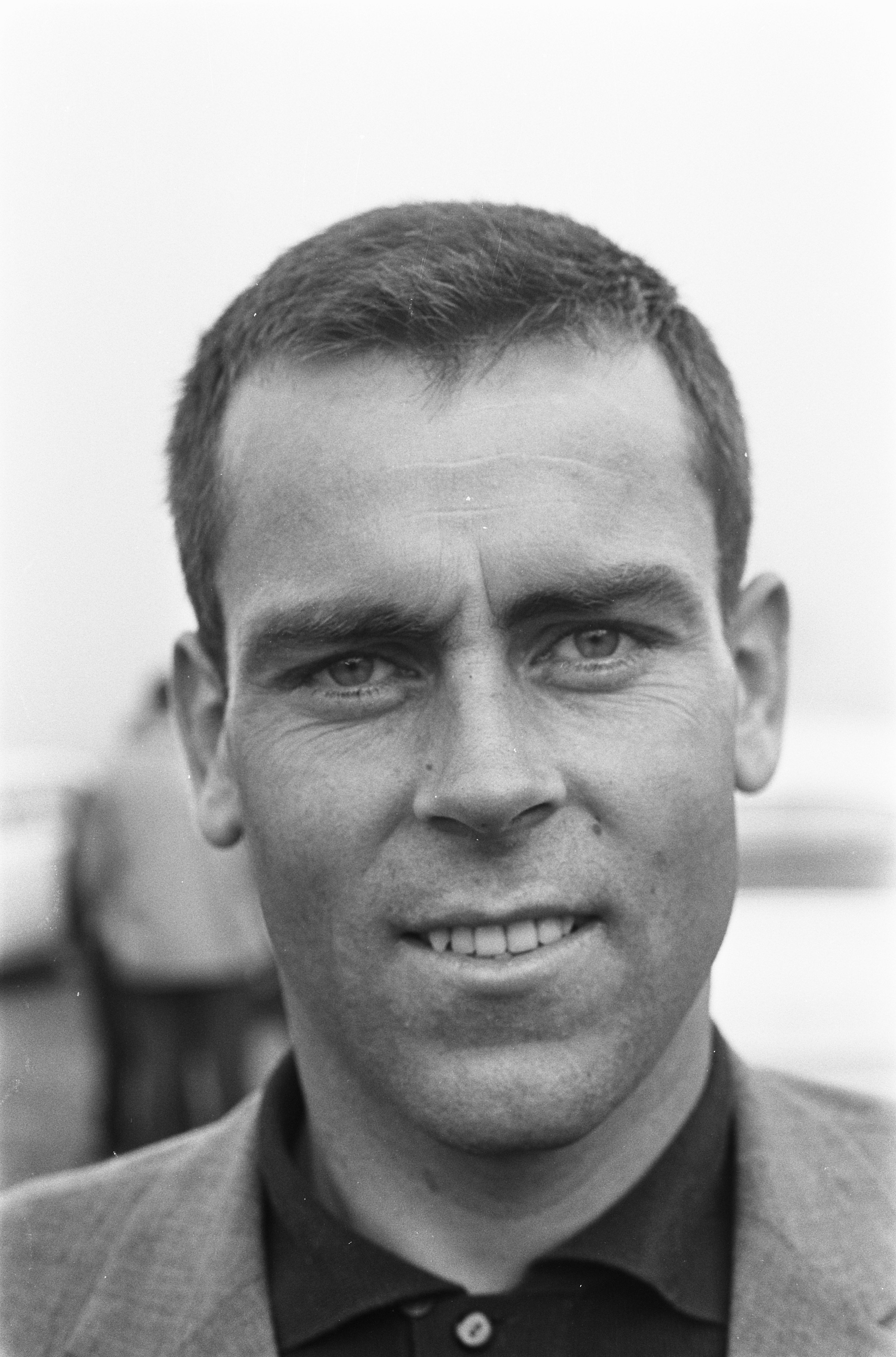
- Jo de Roo in 1967

Personal information
- Full name: Johan de Roo
- Born: 5 July 1937 (age 89) Schore, the Netherlands

Cycling career
- Sport: Cycling
- Current team: Retired
- Discipline: Road
- Role: Rider
- Rider type: All Rounder

Amateur team
- 1954–1957: Unknown

Professional teams
- 1958–1959: Magneet-Vredestein
- 1960–1961: Helyett-Fynsec
- 1962: Saint-Raphael-Helyett
- 1963–1964: Saint-Raphael-Gitane
- 1965: Televizier
- 1966: Televizier-Batavus
- 1967–1968: Willem II-Gazelle

Major wins
- Grand Tours Tour de France 3 individual Stages 1 TTT Vuelta a España 1 individual Stage Stage Races Giro di Sardegna (1960) Single-Day Races and Classics Dutch Road Race Champion (1964, 1965) Tour of Flanders (1965) Giro di Lombardia (1962, 1963) Paris–Tours (1962, 1963) Bordeaux-Paris (1962) Other Super Prestige Pernod (1962)

Johan de Roo (born 5 July 1937) is a Dutch former professional road racing cyclist between 1958 and 1968. During 11 seasons as a professional he had six victories in single-day classics, three stages of the Tour de France and one stage of the Vuelta a España. He had 46 wins as a professional. He was the most successful rider from Zeeland until the emergence of Jan Raas.

== Career details ==
De Roo caught the eye in 1957 as a 20-year-old amateur when he took two stages in the Olympia's Tour as well as winning the Omloop van de Kempen. The following year he turned professional with the Dutch Magneet-Vredestein team, with which he stayed for two seasons. In 1960 he moved to the Helyett, which had Jacques Anquetil as leader. He rode for five years with Anquetil at Helyett and then at St-Raphaël.

In 1960 he rode his first Tour de France, abandoning after stage 14 and saying the tour was not for him. 1962 was de Roo's best year as a professional. He won the Gerrit Schulte Trophy as Dutch cyclist of the year after winning Paris–Tours, the Giro di Lombardia and Bordeaux–Paris. De Roo's Autumn Double of Paris–Tours and the Giro di Lombardia in the same year is a rare achievement as the races are different in style and topography. In winning the 1962 Paris–Tours, de Roo was awarded the Ruban Jaune for setting a record speed for a professional race of 44.903kmh over 267 km. In 1962 de Roo also won the Super Prestige Pernod, a season-long competition to find the best rider in the classics and top stage races.

De Roo did not go to the 1962 world championship after a disagreement over expenses with the Dutch cycling federation.

De Roo repeated the Autumn Double in 1963. In 1964 he was Dutch road race champion and then returned to the Tour de France after a three-year hiatus to win the stage between Montpellier and Perpignan. In 1965 de Roo left Anquetil's team and signed a two-year contract with the Dutch Televizier squad, which included Gerben Karstens. 1965 saw victory in the Tour of Flanders when he escaped with Ward Sels on the Valkenberg and then won the sprint. Another stage win came at that year's Tour de France, into Bordeaux. 1966 saw victory at the Omloop "Het Volk"; he won another stage in the Tour de France on his birthday (between Montpellier and Aubenas) and a stage in the Vuelta a España between Madrid and Calatayud.

De Roo spent the last two years of his career (1967 and 1968) with Willem II-Gazelle, riding in the company of Rik Van Looy and Peter Post in the last days of their careers. He rode the 1967 Tour de France as part of the Dutch national team and finished 76th. Jo de Roo retired at the end of 1968 at 31. His last victory was on 25 June 1968 in Zomergem.

== Major results ==
1957
1st Omloop van de Kempen
3rd Overall Ronde van West-Vlaanderen

1st Stage 1
1st Stage 2

1st Stage 2 Olympia's Tour
1st Stage 3b Olympia's Tour(TTT)
1st Patrijzenjacht
1st Stage 3b Omloop der 9 provincies
1958
1st Stage 6 Ronde van Nederland
1959
1st Six days of Antwerp (with Jean Palmans)
1960
1st Overall Giro di Sardegna

1st Stage 1

1st Stage 4 Ronde van Nederland
1st Stage 3 Tour de Champagne
1961
1st GP Monaco
1962
1st Overall Super Prestige Pernod
1st Giro di Lombardia
1st Paris–Tours
1st Bordeaux–Paris
1st Stage 2b GP du Midi-Libre
1st Stage 2 Tour du Sud-Est
1st Stage 1 Tour de l'Aude
1963
1st Giro di Lombardia
1st Paris–Tours
1964
1st National Road Race Champion
1st Stage 12 Tour de France
1st Stage 4b GP du Midi-Libre
3rd Tour of Flanders
1965
1st National Road Race Champion
1st Stage 8 Tour de France
1st Tour of Flanders
1st Stage 5 Ronde van Nederland
1966
1st Stage 3a Tour de France (TTT)
1st Stage 14a Tour de France
1st Stage 6 Vuelta a España
1st Omloop Het Volk
1st Dr. Tistaert Prijs
1967
1st Belsele-Puivelde koers
1968
1st Zomergem

Sporting positions
Preceded by Peter Post	Dutch National Road Race Champion; 1964	Succeeded by Jo de Roo
Preceded by Jo de Roo	Dutch National Road Race Champion; 1965	Succeeded by Gerben Karstens
