= Matteo Trentin =

Italian road cyclist

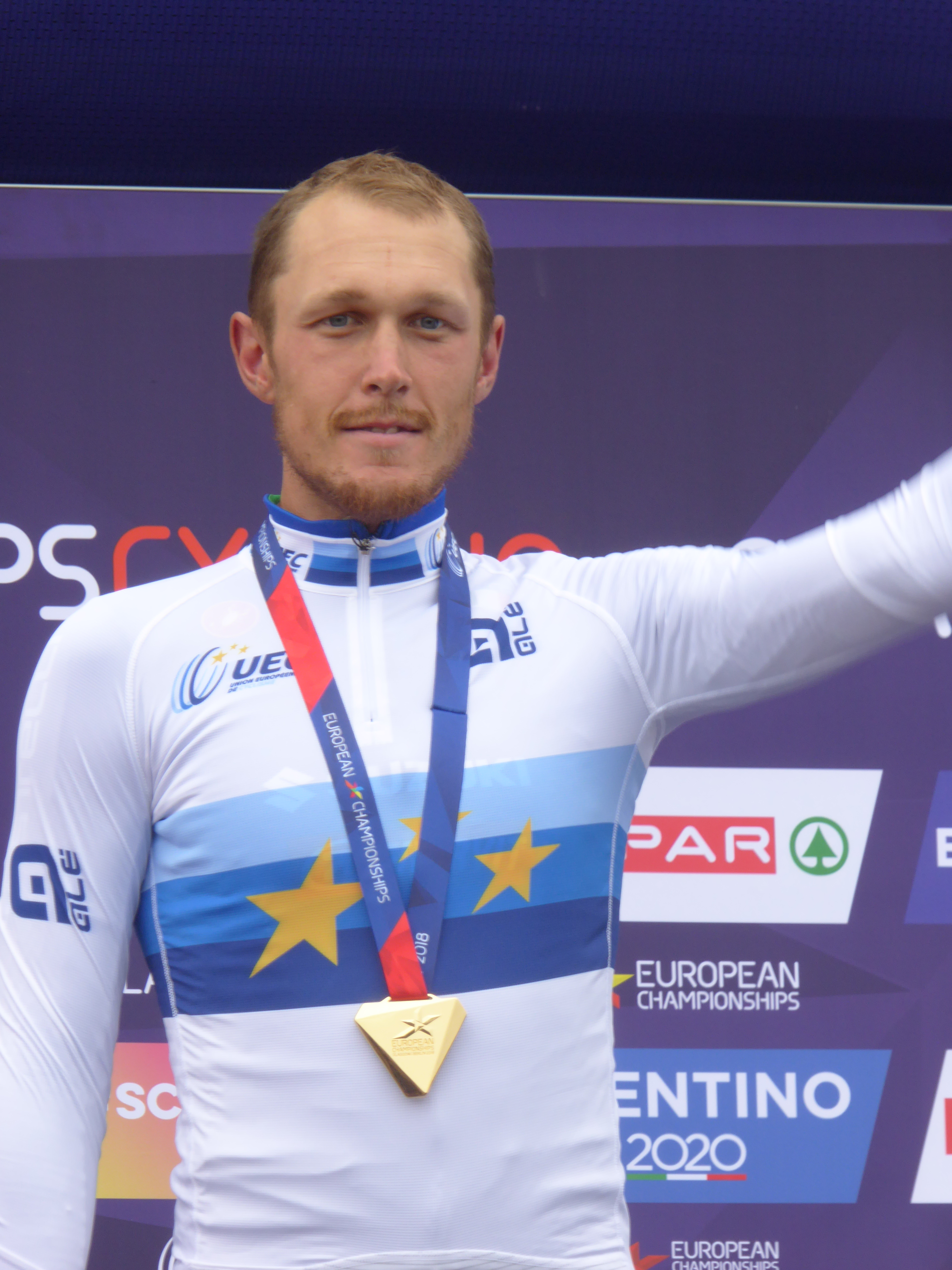
- Trentin, having won the men's road race at the 2018 European Road Cycling Championships

Personal information
- Full name: Matteo Trentin
- Born: 2 August 1989 (age 37) Borgo Valsugana, Italy
- Height: 1.79 m (5 ft 10 in)
- Weight: 74 kg (163 lb)

Cycling career
- Sport: Cycling
- Current team: Tudor Pro Cycling Team
- Disciplines: Road; Cyclo-cross (former)
- Role: Rider
- Rider type: Sprinter; Classics specialist

Amateur teams
- 2007–2009: Moro Scott Bicycle Line Spercenigo
- 2010: Marchiol–Pasta Montegrappa–Orogildo
- 2011: Brilla–Pasta Montegrappa

Professional teams
- 2011–2017: Quick-Step
- 2018–2019: Mitchelton–Scott
- 2020: CCC Team
- 2021–2023: UAE Team Emirates
- 2024–: Tudor Pro Cycling Team

Major wins
- Grand Tours Tour de France 3 individual stages (2013, 2014, 2019) Giro d'Italia 1 individual stage (2016) Vuelta a España 4 individual stages (2017) Stage races Tour de Wallonie (2024) One-day races and Classics European Road Race Championships (2018) Paris–Tours (2015, 2017, 2025) Primus Classic (2017) Giro del Veneto (2022)
Medal record
Representing Italy
Men's road bicycle racing
World Championships
Silver medal – second place	2019 Harrogate	Road race
European Championships
Gold medal – first place	2018 Glasgow	Road race

Matteo Trentin (born 2 August 1989) is an Italian professional cyclist, who rides for UCI ProTeam Tudor Pro Cycling Team. Having initially started his career in cyclo-cross, Trentin has competed more prominently in road bicycle racing, having taken more than thirty professional victories – including eight stage wins across the three Grand Tours, victories at Paris–Tours in 2015, 2017 and 2025, and he won the road race at the 2018 European Road Cycling Championships in Glasgow.

== Career ==
=== Junior and amateur career ===
Born in Borgo Valsugana, Trentin first competed as a junior for the Moro Scott Bicycle Line Spercenigo team. In 2007, Trentin was given a two-month suspension, following a positive test for salbutamol recorded the previous year at a UCI Cyclo-cross World Cup event. He joined Marchiol–Pasta Montegrappa–Orogildo in 2010, where he won the opening stage of the Giro del Friuli-Venezia Giulia from a breakaway. The following year, Trentin joined the Brilla–Pasta Montegrappa team, winning the Gran Premio della Liberazione, the Trofeo Alcide De Gasperi, and the under-23 Italian National Road Race Championships.

=== Quick-Step (2011–2017) ===
Having initially been announced to ride as a stagiaire in the second half of the 2011 season, Trentin turned professional that August with Quick-Step, making his first start with the team at the Eneco Tour. In his first full season with the team in 2012, Trentin finished second on the penultimate stage of the Volta ao Algarve, having led out teammate Gerald Ciolek to an eventual stage victory. The following year, he fractured his right scaphoid bone at the start of the 2013 season following a fall during Omloop Het Nieuwsblad, leaving him out of competition for two months. Trentin took his maiden professional victory that July at the Tour de France, winning stage 14 in Lyon, following a sprint against his breakaway counterparts.

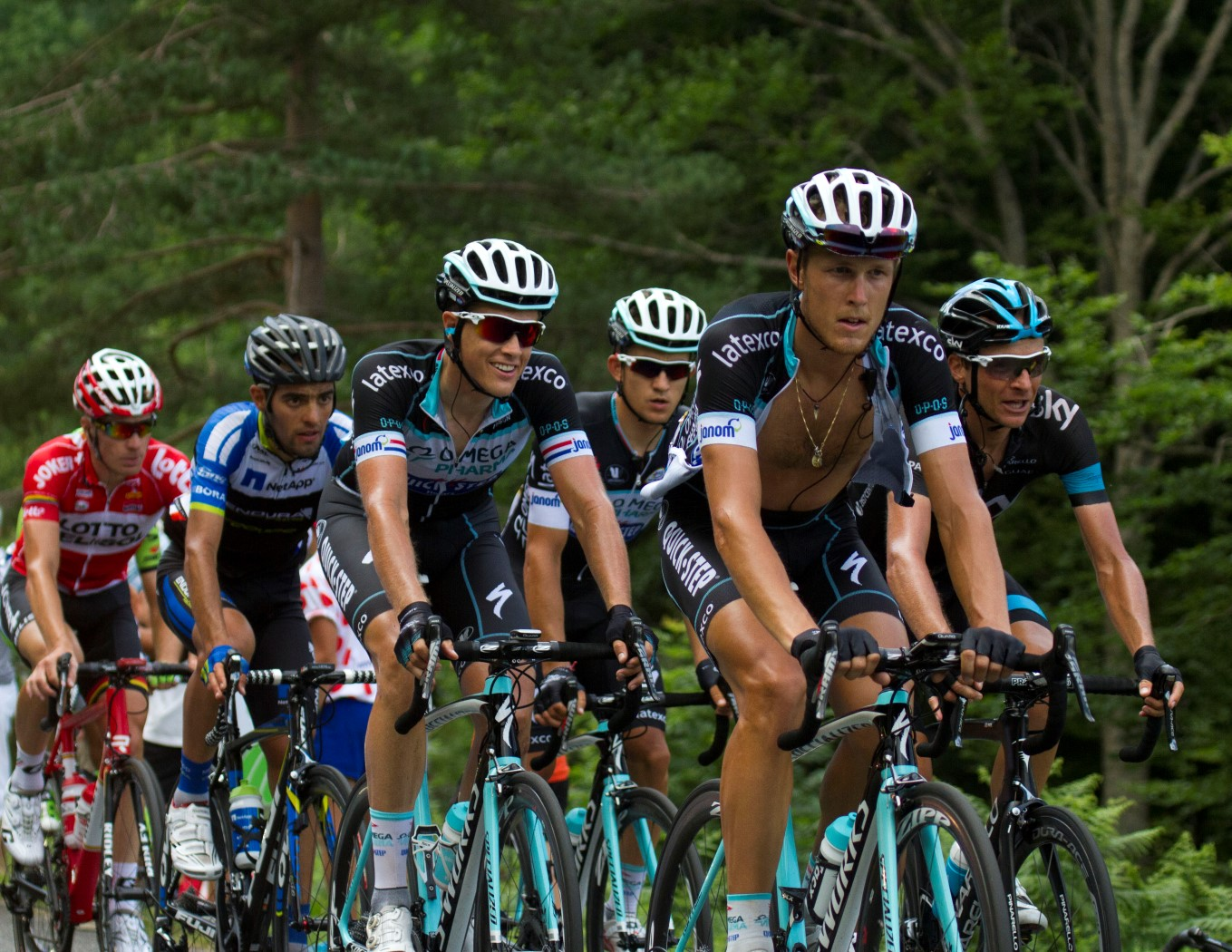
Trentin leading a group of riders at the 2014 Tour de France, where he won a stage of the race for the second consecutive year

In June 2014, Trentin won a stage of the Tour de Suisse, following a lead-out from teammate Tony Martin, who was the race leader at the time. A month later, he took a prestigious victory on Stage 7 of the Tour de France, where he won the sprint by a few centimetres over Peter Sagan.

During the 2015 cobbled classics, Trentin took his first podium finish when he finished in third place at E3 Harelbeke, winning the main sprint behind Geraint Thomas and teammate Zdeněk Štybar. In August, he won two stages and the points classification at the Tour du Poitou-Charentes, and followed this with a stage win at the Tour of Britain the following month. He recorded podium finishes in Italian races either side of the UCI Road World Championships, with third at the Coppa Bernocchi, and second in Gran Piemonte, before concluding his season with victory in Paris–Tours. At Paris–Tours, Trentin won the race in a record speed for a professional race over 200 kilometres (120 miles) in length, thus becoming the new Ruban Jaune.

Trentin recorded his first top-ten finish in one of the cycling monuments in 2016, when he finished as part of the lead group – in tenth place – at Milan–San Remo. In May, he won stage 18 of the Giro d'Italia from the breakaway, usurping Moreno Moser and teammate Gianluca Brambilla before the finish line in Pinerolo, having bridged over from a chasing group in the closing kilometres. He then won a stage and the points classification at the Tour de Wallonie in July, and then repeated the feat the following month, at the Tour de l'Ain.

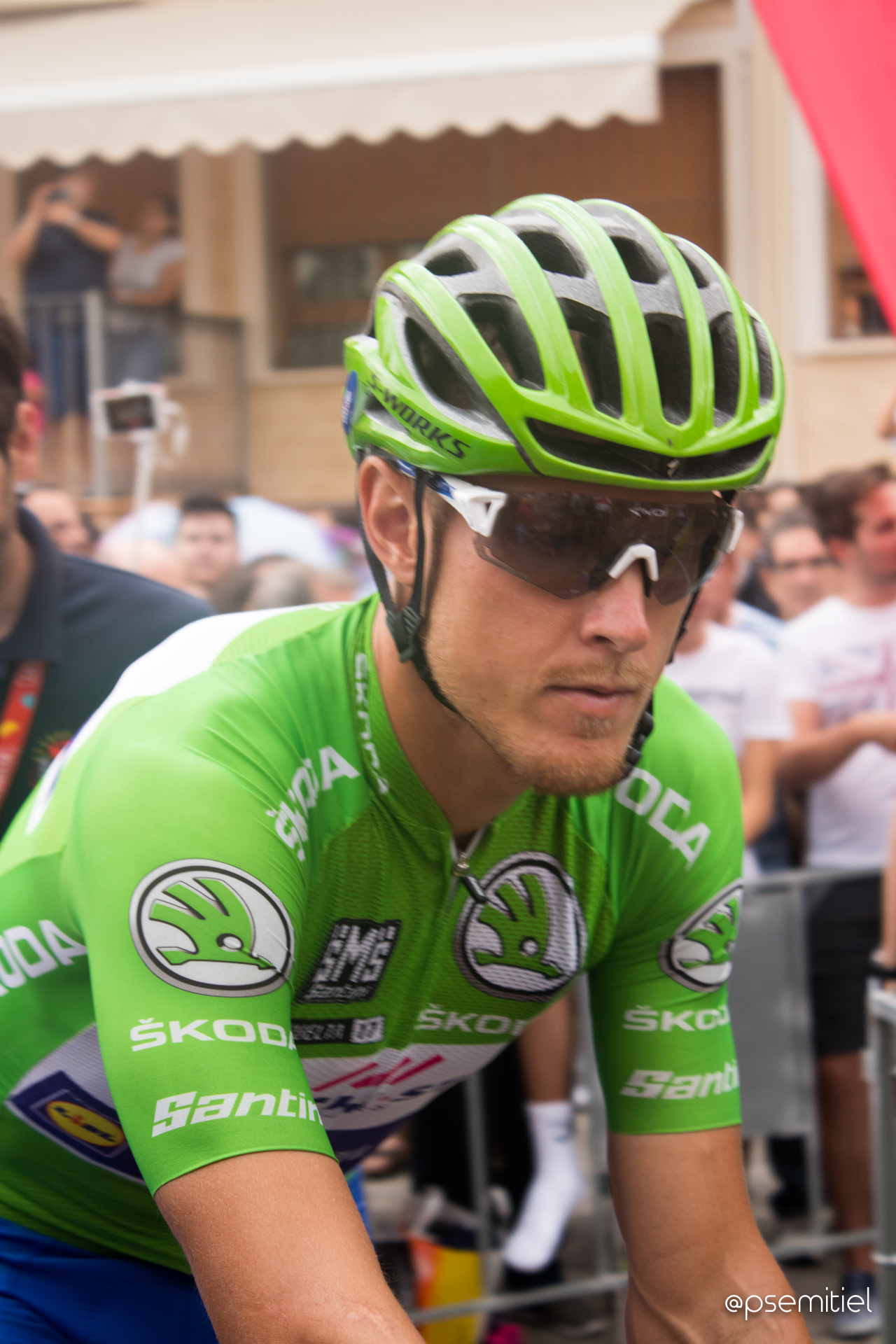
Trentin at the 2017 Vuelta a España, where he won four stages but missed out on the points classification by two points to Chris Froome

Having taken top-five placings at both the Trofeo Laigueglia (fourth), and Kuurne–Brussels–Kuurne (fifth), Trentin's first victory of the 2017 season did not come until early August, when he won the second stage of the Vuelta a Burgos on his birthday. At the Vuelta a España, Trentin led home the peloton on the first sprint stage, on day two – behind teammate Yves Lampaert, who had soloed clear with a kilometre remaining. Two stages later, he won the sprint into Tarragona, and as a result, became the 100th rider to win stages at each of the three Grand Tours. He added further stage victories on stages 10, 13, and 21, but he missed out on the green points classification jersey to overall race winner Chris Froome, who had sprinted for 11th place on the final day to retain the jersey. Following the Vuelta a España, Trentin took further victories – both from late attacks – at the Grand Prix Impanis-Van Petegem, and Paris–Tours. He also finished in second place at Binche–Chimay–Binche, and fourth place in the road race at the UCI Road World Championships in Norway.

=== Mitchelton–Scott (2018–2019) ===
In August 2017, it was announced that Trentin was joining Orica–Scott – later renamed as Mitchelton–Scott – from the 2018 season, on a two-year contract.

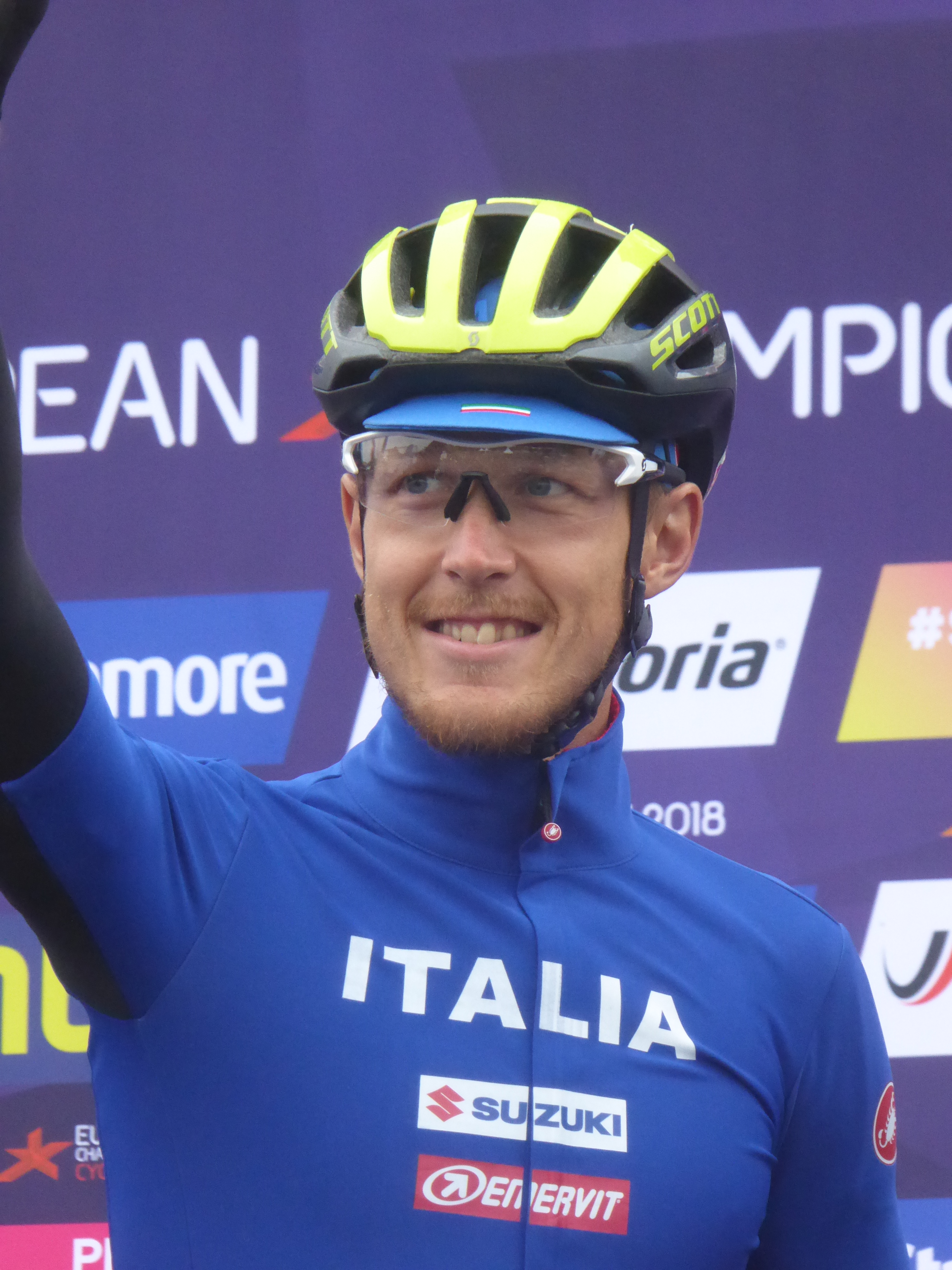
Trentin at the 2018 European Road Cycling Championships, where he won the men's road race

Prior to August's European Championships in Glasgow, Trentin's best result of the 2018 season was a third-place stage finish on the opening day of the Tour de Pologne. In the European road race, Trentin was one of two Italian riders in a group of five that remained clear of the field on the final lap; with a lead-out from teammate Davide Cimolai, Trentin was able to fend off Mathieu van der Poel and Wout van Aert in the sprint for the victory. Having debuted the European champion's jersey at the EuroEyes Cyclassics the following weekend, finishing in fifth place, Trentin took one more victory during the season, winning the penultimate stage at the Tour of Guangxi in October.

In 2019, Trentin started his season with a block of racing in Spain, taking a stage victory at the Volta a la Comunitat Valenciana, and then recorded a further two stage wins at the Vuelta a Andalucía. His next victory did not come until July, when he took his third career stage victory at the Tour de France, with a 14-kilometre (8.7-mile) solo move from the breakaway on stage 17 into Gap. Trentin won the second stage of September's Tour of Britain, ultimately finishing second overall to Van der Poel; he also won the points classification, having finished no lower than thirteenth on any of the eight stages. Having then won the Trofeo Matteotti, Trentin was one of the favourites for the road race at the UCI Road World Championships in Yorkshire. Held in treacherous weather conditions, Trentin was part of a group of four riders that remained clear on the circuits around Harrogate, but was beaten to the line by Denmark's Mads Pedersen, ultimately finishing with the silver medal.

=== CCC Team (2020) ===
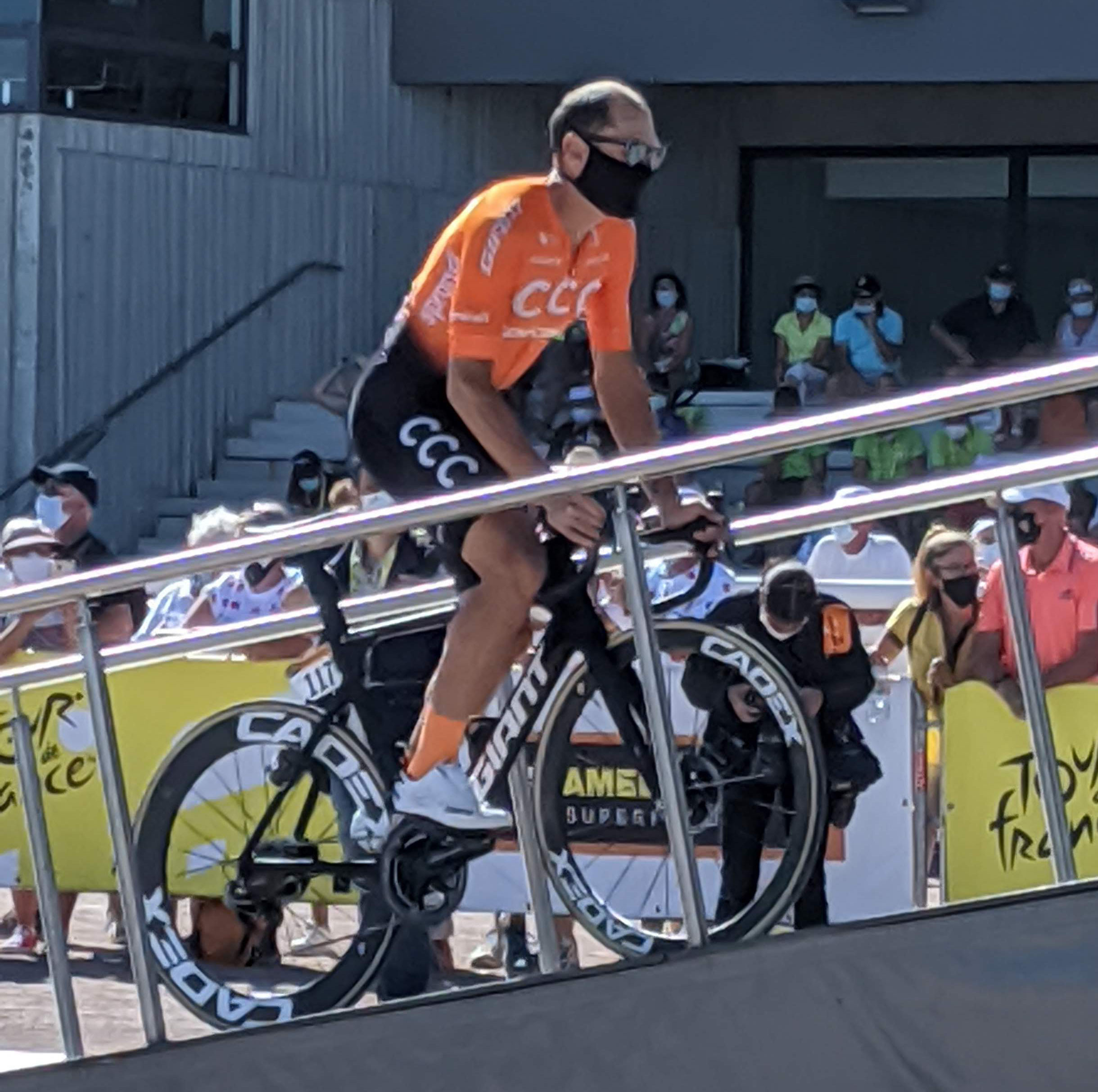
Trentin at the 2020 Tour de France

In August 2019, it was announced that Trentin was to leave Mitchelton–Scott at the end of the 2019 season to join the CCC Team from 2020, signing an initial two-year contract. In the early part of 2020, Trentin finished in fourth place at Omloop Het Nieuwsblad, having been dropped by the leaders on the Muur van Geraardsbergen on the run-in to Ninove. With the remainder of the season impacted by the COVID-19 pandemic, Trentin recorded his best result of the season with a third-place result at Gent–Wevelgem – delayed from the spring to October – when he led the CCC Team at the race following an injury suffered by Greg Van Avermaet.

=== UAE Team Emirates (2021–2023) ===
As CCC Team was taken over at the end of the 2020 season, Trentin rode for his third team in as many seasons in 2021, having joined UAE Team Emirates on an initial two-year contract.

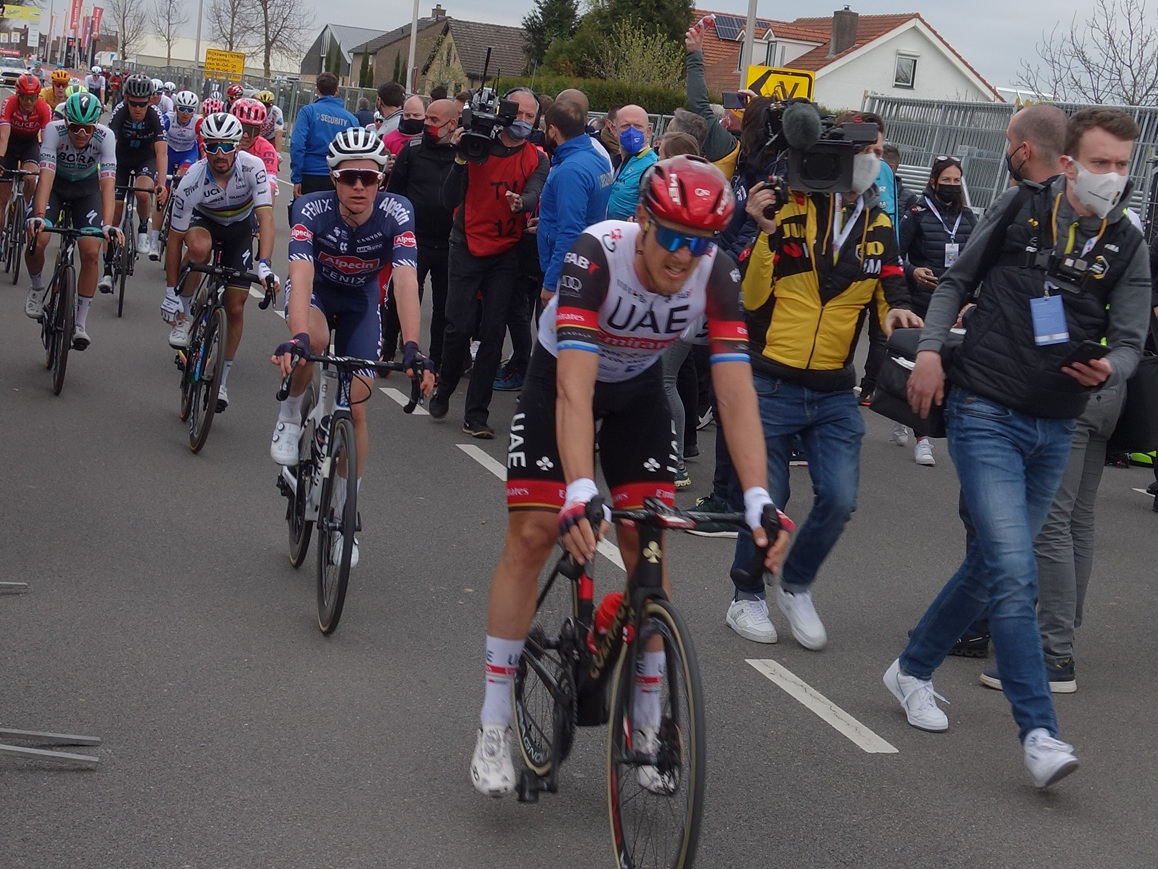
Trentin leading a group of riders at the finish of the 2021 Amstel Gold Race

He recorded a top-ten finish in his first race with the team with seventh place at the Grand Prix La Marseillaise, and recorded further top-ten finishes in both races held as part of the Belgian "Opening Weekend" – finishing eighth at Omloop Het Nieuwsblad, and fourth at Kuurne–Brussels–Kuurne. He then repeated his third-place finish from the previous year at Gent–Wevelgem, and scored another third-place finish the following month at Brabantse Pijl. After missing out on a victory on stage 13 at the Vuelta a España to Florian Sénéchal, Trentin recorded six consecutive top-four finishes in Italian races held in September and October – which included a fourth-place finish in the road race at the European Road Championships, and a second victory in three years at the Trofeo Matteotti.

Having placed second behind teammate Alessandro Covi at February's Vuelta a Murcia, Trentin took his first victory of the 2022 season the following month at Le Samyn, winning the sprint from a lead group of eight riders. He was scheduled to compete in the Tour de France, but two days prior to the start in Copenhagen, Trentin recorded a positive test for COVID-19, and was replaced by Marc Hirschi. In September, Trentin won a stage and the points classification at the Tour de Luxembourg, before finishing in fifth place in the road race at the UCI Road World Championships in Australia. He took his third win of the season the following month, winning the Giro del Veneto in a sprint from a small group.

In 2023, Trentin recorded his first top-ten finish at the Tour of Flanders in April, recording a tenth-place finish after having been a part of several attacks in the middle third of the race. At the Critérium du Dauphiné in June, Trentin missed out on two stage victories to Christophe Laporte, and at the Tour de France, Trentin found himself in two breakaways during the race. He ultimately went through a season winless for the first time since 2020.

=== Tudor Pro Cycling Team ===
In 2024, Trentin dropped down from UCI WorldTeam level, as he joined the Tudor Pro Cycling Team – a UCI ProTeam – on a three-year contract. He finished ninth in his first race with the team, at the Grand Prix La Marseillaise, before taking his first podium finish a couple of weeks later at the Clásica de Almería, with a third-place finish. He rode the Giro d'Italia for the team, again making it into two breakaways during the race – finishing sixth on the second of these, on stage twelve.

In 2025, Trentin won Paris–Tours for the third time, tying the record for the most wins.

== Personal life ==
Trentin lives in Monaco and is married to television presenter and former skier Claudia Morandini, and the couple have two children.

== Major results ==
=== Road ===
2010
1st Stage 1 Giro del Friuli-Venezia Giulia
2nd Trofeo Alcide De Gasperi
2nd Ruota d'Oro
3rd Faè di Oderzo
5th Trofeo Gianfranco Bianchin
6th Trofeo Edil C
7th Gran Premio della Liberazione
2011
1st Road race, National Under-23 Championships
1st Gran Premio della Liberazione
1st Trofeo Alcide De Gasperi
2nd Gran Premio Industrie del Marmo
5th Ronde Van Vlaanderen Beloften
2012
1st Gullegem Koerse
9th Grote Prijs Jef Scherens
10th Overall Driedaagse van West-Vlaanderen
10th Le Samyn
2013 (1 pro win)
1st Stage 14 Tour de France
2014 (2)
1st Stage 7 Tour de France
1st Stage 6 Tour de Suisse
1st Stage 1 (TTT) Tirreno–Adriatico
4th Trofeo Ses Salines
9th Kuurne–Brussels–Kuurne
2015 (4)
1st Paris–Tours
Tour du Poitou-Charentes

1st Points classification
1st Stages 2 & 5

1st Stage 6 Tour of Britain
2nd Gran Piemonte
3rd E3 Harelbeke
3rd Coppa Bernocchi
6th Scheldeprijs
2016 (3)
1st Stage 18 Giro d'Italia
Tour de l'Ain

1st Points classification
1st Stage 1

Tour de Wallonie

1st Points classification
1st Stage 4

4th Paris–Tours
4th Münsterland Giro
5th Trofeo Felanitx–Ses Salines-Campos-Porreres
9th EuroEyes Cyclassics
9th Bretagne Classic
10th Milan–San Remo
2017 (7)
1st Paris–Tours
1st Primus Classic
Vuelta a España

1st Stages 4, 10, 13 & 21
Combativity award Stage 10
Held after Stages 4–8, 10–14

1st Stage 2 Vuelta a Burgos
2nd Binche–Chimay–Binche
4th Road race, UCI World Championships
4th Trofeo Laigueglia
5th Kuurne–Brussels–Kuurne
9th Omloop Het Nieuwsblad
2018 (2)
1st Road race, UEC European Championships
1st Stage 5 Tour of Guangxi
4th Vuelta a Murcia
5th EuroEyes Cyclassics
6th Gran Premio Bruno Beghelli
7th Gent–Wevelgem
2019 (6)
1st Trofeo Matteotti
Tour de France

1st Stage 17
Combativity award Stages 12 & 17

Vuelta a Andalucía

1st Stages 2 & 5

1st Stage 2 Volta a la Comunitat Valenciana
2nd Road race, UCI World Championships
2nd Overall Tour of Britain

1st Points classification
1st Stage 2

7th Road race, UEC European Championships
7th Overall Vuelta a Murcia
7th E3 Binckbank Classic
7th Gent–Wevelgem
7th EuroEyes Cyclassics
9th Omloop Het Nieuwsblad
10th Milan–San Remo
10th Amstel Gold Race
2020
3rd Gent–Wevelgem
4th Omloop Het Nieuwsblad
6th Three Days of Bruges–De Panne
2021 (1)
1st Trofeo Matteotti
2nd Coppa Agostoni
2nd Giro del Veneto
3rd Gent–Wevelgem
3rd Brabantse Pijl
4th Road race, UEC European Championships
4th Kuurne–Brussels–Kuurne
4th Gran Piemonte
4th Memorial Marco Pantani
7th Grand Prix La Marseillaise
8th Omloop Het Nieuwsblad
9th Circuito de Getxo
Combativity award Stage 10 Vuelta a España
2022 (3)
1st Le Samyn
1st Giro del Veneto
2nd Vuelta a Murcia
4th Coppa Bernocchi
5th Road race, UCI World Championships
5th Veneto Classic
6th Overall Tour de Luxembourg

1st Points classification
1st Stage 2

7th Omloop Het Nieuwsblad
9th Kuurne–Brussels–Kuurne
9th Grand Prix of Aargau Canton
2023
4th Binche–Chimay–Binche
4th Circuito de Getxo
5th Road race, National Championships
5th Vuelta a Murcia
9th Overall Renewi Tour
10th Tour of Flanders
2024 (2)
1st Overall Tour de Wallonie

1st Points classification
1st Stage 4

3rd Clásica de Almería
5th Time trial, National Championships
6th Super 8 Classic
8th Overall Danmark Rundt
9th Omloop Het Nieuwsblad
9th Hamburg Cyclassics
9th Grand Prix La Marseillaise
10th Gent–Wevelgem
10th Scheldeprijs
2025 (1)
1st Paris–Tours
5th Grand Prix de Wallonie
6th Coppa Bernocchi
6th Super 8 Classic
9th Milan–San Remo
2026
3rd Kuurne–Brussels–Kuurne
6th Gent–Wevelgem
8th Overall Renewi Tour
9th Milan–San Remo
10th E3 Saxo Classic

==== Grand Tour general classification results timeline ====
Grand Tour	2013	2014	2015	2016	2017	2018	2019	2020	2021	2022	2023	2024	2025	2026
Giro d'Italia	117	—	—	74	—	—	—	—	—	—	—	82	—	—
Tour de France	142	93	117	—	DNF	—	52	79	—	—	107	—	99	DNF
Vuelta a España	—	—	—	—	84	125	—	—	80	—	—	—	—	—

==== Classics results timeline ====
Monument	2011	2012	2013	2014	2015	2016	2017	2018	2019	2020	2021	2022	2023	2024	2025	2026
Milan–San Remo	—	DNF	—	DNF	—	10	55	37	10	DNF	12	—	19	21	9	9
Tour of Flanders	—	DNF	—	58	88	34	13	45	21	62	57	34	10	19	22	DNF
Paris–Roubaix	—	DNF	—	95	51	36	88	DNF	43	NH	DNF	43	19	—	—	—
Liège–Bastogne–Liège	Has not contested during his career															
Giro di Lombardia	DNF	—	—	—	DNF	—	—	—	DNF	—	—	—	—	—	—	—
Classic	2011	2012	2013	2014	2015	2016	2017	2018	2019	2020	2021	2022	2023	2024	2025	2026
Omloop Het Nieuwsblad	—	DNF	DNF	72	47	—	9	55	9	4	8	7	98	9	12	15
Kuurne–Brussels–Kuurne	—	—	NH	9	106	—	5	16	DNF	DNF	4	9	DNF	85	91	3
E3 Harelbeke	—	90	—	—	3	12	22	11	7	NH	18	—	DNF	23	14	10
Gent–Wevelgem	—	64	—	15	28	47	51	7	7	3	3	70	21	10	15	6
Scheldeprijs	—	11	—	114	6	85	20	—	—	—	—	—	—	10	—	—
Brabantse Pijl	—	—	—	—	—	—	—	—	—	75	3	22	DNF	—	87	—
Amstel Gold Race	—	—	—	—	—	58	—	—	10	NH	12	17	52	—	DNF	—
Hamburg Cyclassics	85	83	—	27	—	9	—	5	7	NH	—	12	—	9	44	105
Bretagne Classic	113	105	—	52	24	9	—	—	22	—	—	88	18	—	—	
Paris–Tours	—	—	—	—	1	4	1	—	—	—	—	26	107	11	1	

==== Major championships timeline ====
Event		2012	2013	2014	2015	2016	2017	2018	2019	2020	2021	2022	2023	2024	2025
World Championships	Road race	120	—	—	34	DNF	4	—	2	—	DNF	5	DNF	—	—
European Championships	Road race	Elite did not exist				—	—	1	7	45	4	64	14	45	—
National Championships	Road race	DNF	—	17	DNF	—	9	32	DNF	16	—	DNF	5	15	42

Legend
—	Did not compete
DNF	Did not finish
NH	Not held

=== Cyclo-cross ===
2005–2006
3rd National Junior Championships
2006–2007
1st National Junior Championships
2009–2010
3rd National Under-23 Championships
2010–2011
3rd UCI Under-23 World Cup

3rd Pont-Château

3rd Faè di Oderzo

== See also ==
- List of riders with stage wins at all three cycling Grand Tours
