= Albert Goutal =

French cyclist

Personal information
- Born: 1 December 1918 Piriac-sur-Mer, France
- Died: 2 May 2009 (aged 90) Batz-sur-Mer, France

Cycling career
- Sport: Cycling
- Discipline: Road
- Role: Rider

Professional teams
- 1938-1939: Terrot - Hutchinson
- 1941-1945: Dilecta - Wolber
- 1943: Génial Lucifer
- 1946-1947: Arliguie - Hutchinson
- 1948: La Perle - Hutchinson
- 1949: Rochet - Dunlop
- 1949: Vanoli-Dunlop
- 1950: Terrot - Wolber
- 1951: Rochet - Dunlop
- 1952: Vanoli

Major wins
- French National Road Race Championships (1941)

Albert Goutal (1 December 1918– 2 May 2009) was a French cyclist. Professional 1938 to 1952, he won the French National Road Race Championships in the occupied area in 1941.

== Palmarès ==
1941

French National Road Race Championships in the occupied zone
2nd of Paris–Tours
2nd of Bordeaux-Angoulême
3rd of the National Criterium - occupied zone

1942

5th stage b Circuit France
Hillclimb Ménilmontant

1949

6th stage of the Tour of Algeria

1950

2nd stage of the Circuit of Gold Coast
2nd Circuit Côte d'Or

== Results on the major tours ==
=== Tour de France ===
- 1939: DNF
