= 1937 Paris–Tours =

Race details
- Dates: 25 April 1937
- Stages: 1
- Distance: 251 km (156.0 mi)
- Winning time: 6h 06' 27"

Results
	Winner	Gustave Danneels (BEL)
	Second	Frans Bonduel (BEL)
	Third	Edgard De Caluwé (BEL)

The 1937 Paris–Tours was the 32nd edition of the Paris–Tours cycle race and was held on 25 April 1937. The race started in Paris and finished in Tours. The race was won by Gustave Danneels.

== General classification ==
Final general classification

Rank	Rider	Time
1	Gustave Danneels (BEL)	6h 06' 27"
2	Frans Bonduel (BEL)	+ 0"
3	Edgard De Caluwé (BEL)	+ 0"
4	Paul Chocque (FRA)	+ 0"
5	Albert Hendrickx (BEL)	+ 0"
6	Maurice Archambaud (FRA)	+ 0"
7	Sylvain Marcaillou (FRA)	+ 0"
8	Antonin Magne (FRA)	+ 0"
9	Emile Gamard (FRA)	+ 0"
10	Félicien Vervaecke (BEL)	+ 0"
