= 2025 Paris–Tours =

- 2025 UCI ProSeries

Race details
- Dates: 12 October 2025
- Stages: 1
- Distance: 211.6 km (131.5 mi)
- Winning time: 4h 18' 50"

Results
	Winner	Matteo Trentin (ITA)	(Tudor Pro Cycling Team)
	Second	Christophe Laporte (FRA)	(Visma–Lease a Bike)
	Third	Albert Philipsen (DEN)	(Lidl–Trek)

The 2025 Paris–Tours was the 119th edition of the Paris–Tours road cycling classic. It was held on 12 October 2025 as part of the 2025 UCI ProSeries calendar.

== Teams ==
12 of the 18 UCI WorldTeams, seven UCI ProTeams, and four UCI Continental teams made up the 23 teams that participated in the race.

UCI WorldTeams

- Visma–Lease a Bike
- Lidl–Trek
- Alpecin–Deceuninck
- Decathlon–AG2R La Mondiale
- UAE Team Emirates XRG
- Groupama–FDJ
- Ineos Grenadiers
- Arkéa–B&B Hotels
- XDS Astana Team
- Cofidis
- Intermarché–Wanty
- Team Picnic–PostNL

UCI ProTeams

- Lotto
- Uno-X Mobility
- Team TotalEnergies
- Tudor Pro Cycling Team
- Israel–Premier Tech
- Q36.5 Pro Cycling Team
- Unibet Tietema Rockets

UCI Continental Teams

- St. Michel–Preference Home–Auber93
- Van Rysel–Roubaix
- CIC–U–Nantes
- Nice Métropole Côte d'Azur

== Results ==
Result
Rank	Rider	Team	Time
1	Matteo Trentin (ITA)	Tudor Pro Cycling Team	4h 18' 50"
2	Christophe Laporte (FRA)	Visma–Lease a Bike	+ 0"
3	Albert Philipsen (DEN)	Lidl–Trek	+ 0"
4	Paul Lapeira (FRA)	Decathlon–AG2R La Mondiale	+ 0"
5	Thibaud Gruel (FRA)	Groupama–FDJ	+ 0"
6	Stefan Bissegger (SUI)	Decathlon–AG2R La Mondiale	+ 03"
7	Mathias Vacek (CZE)	Lidl–Trek	+ 19"
8	Dorian Godon (FRA)	Decathlon–AG2R La Mondiale	+ 23"
9	Jasper Stuyven (BEL)	Lidl–Trek	+ 23"
10	Alessandro Covi (ITA)	UAE Team Emirates XRG	+ 23"
