= Eugène Prévost (cyclist) =

French bicycle racer

Personal information
- Full name: Lucien Eugène Prévost
- Born: 29 June 1863 Champdôtre, France
- Died: 26 November 1961 (aged 98) Savigny-lès-Beaune, France

Cycling career
- Sport: Cycling
- Discipline: Road
- Role: Rider

Lucien Eugène Prévost (French: [øʒɛn pʁevo]; 29 June 1863 – 26 November 1961) was a French cyclist who won the first edition of Paris–Tours in 1896. He also rode in the 1904 Tour de France, but dropped out on the first stage.

He was the brother of cyclists Noël Prévost and Charles Prévost.
