= 1945 Paris–Roubaix =

Cycling race

Race details
- Dates: 9 April 1945
- Stages: 1
- Distance: 246 km (152.9 mi)
- Winning time: 7h 52' 54"

Results
	Winner	Paul Maye (FRA)
	Second	Lucien Teisseire (FRA)
	Third	Kléber Piot (FRA)

The 1945 Paris–Roubaix was the 43rd edition of the Paris–Roubaix, a classic one-day cycle race in France. The single day event was held on 9 April 1945 and stretched 246 km (153 mi) from Paris to the finish at Roubaix Velodrome. The winner was Paul Maye from France.

== Results ==
Final results (1–10)
Rank	Cyclist	Time
1	Paul Maye (FRA)	7h 52' 54″
2	Lucien Teisseire (FRA)	+0' 00″
3	Kléber Piot (FRA)	+0' 00″
4	Louis Thiétard (FRA)	+0' 00″
5	Maurice Desimpelaere (BEL)	+0' 00″
6	Édouard Muller (FRA)	+0' 00″
7	Robert Renonce (FRA)	+0' 00″
8	Maurice De Muer (FRA)	+3' 01″
9	Maurice Quentin (FRA)	+3' 01″
10	Lucien Maelfait (FRA)	+3' 01″
