= 2022 Vuelta a Murcia =

2022 UCI Europe Tour

Race details
- Dates: 12 February 2022
- Distance: 183.2 km (113.8 mi)
- Winning time: 4h 34' 50"

Results
	Winner	Alessandro Covi (ITA)	(UAE Team Emirates)
	Second	Matteo Trentin (ITA)	(UAE Team Emirates)
	Third	Matis Louvel (FRA)	(Arkéa–Samsic)

The 2022 Vuelta a Murcia was the 42nd edition of the Vuelta a Murcia road cycling race. It was held on 12 February 2022 in the titular region of southeastern Spain as a category 1.1 event on the 2022 UCI Europe Tour calendar.

The 183.2-kilometre (113.8 mi) long race started in Fortuna and finished in Puerto de Cartagena. It was won by Italian rider Alessandro Covi (UAE Team Emirates), finishing one second ahead of the peloton after a 5 kilometer solo. Covi's teammate and fellow Italian Matteo Trentin won the sprint for second, followed by French rider Matis Louvel (Arkéa–Samsic) coming in third.

== Teams ==
Seven UCI WorldTeams, eleven UCI ProTeams, and two UCI Continental teams made up the twenty teams that participated in the race. Fifteen teams each fielded seven riders, which was the maximum allowed, while four teams each fielded six, and one team (Human Powered Health) only fielded five. Of the 134 riders to start the race, 113 finished.

UCI WorldTeams

- Astana Qazaqstan Team
- Bora–Hansgrohe
- Cofidis
- EF Education–EasyPost
- Intermarché–Wanty–Gobert Matériaux
- Movistar Team
- UAE Team Emirates

UCI ProTeams

- Arkéa–Samsic
- B&B Hotels–KTM
- Bingoal Pauwels Sauces WB
- Burgos BH
- Caja Rural–Seguros RGA
- Drone Hopper–Androni Giocattoli
- Eolo–Kometa
- Equipo Kern Pharma
- Euskaltel–Euskadi
- Human Powered Health
- Sport Vlaanderen–Baloise

UCI Continental Teams

- Electro Hiper Europa–Caldas
- Manuela Fundación

== Results ==
Result
Rank	Rider	Team	Time
1	Alessandro Covi (ITA)	UAE Team Emirates	4h 34' 50"
2	Matteo Trentin (ITA)	UAE Team Emirates	+ 1"
3	Matis Louvel (FRA)	Arkéa–Samsic	+ 1"
4	Jonas Koch (GER)	Intermarché–Wanty–Gobert Matériaux	+ 1"
5	Loïc Vliegen (BEL)	Bora–Hansgrohe	+ 1"
6	Orluis Aular (VEN)	Caja Rural–Seguros RGA	+ 1"
7	Warren Barguil (FRA)	Arkéa–Samsic	+ 1"
8	Thibault Ferasse (FRA)	B&B Hotels–KTM	+ 1"
9	Jesús Ezquerra (ESP)	Burgos BH	+ 1"
10	Marco Tizza (ITA)	Bingoal Pauwels Sauces WB	+ 1"
