= 1936 Paris–Tours =

Race details
- Dates: 3 May 1936
- Stages: 1
- Distance: 251 km (156.0 mi)
- Winning time: 6h 03' 17"

Results
	Winner	Gustave Danneels (BEL)
	Second	Fernand Mithouard (FRA)
	Third	Jules Coelaert (BEL)

The 1936 Paris–Tours was the 31st edition of the Paris–Tours cycle race and was held on 3 May 1936. The race started in Paris and finished in Tours. The race was won by Gustave Danneels.

== General classification ==
Final general classification

Rank	Rider	Time
1	Gustave Danneels (BEL)	6h 03' 17"
2	Fernand Mithouard (FRA)	+ 0"
3	Jules Coelaert (BEL)	+ 0"
4	René Le Grevès (FRA)	+ 5' 14"
5	Georges Speicher (FRA)	+ 5' 14"
6	Jean Aerts (BEL)	+ 5' 14"
7	Louis Thiétard (FRA)	+ 5' 14"
8	Jules Rossi (ITA)	+ 5' 14"
9	Raymond Louviot (FRA)	+ 5' 14"
10	Maurice Archambaud (FRA)	+ 5' 14"
