= 1938 Paris–Tours =

Race details
- Dates: 8 May 1938
- Stages: 1
- Distance: 251 km (156.0 mi)
- Winning time: 5h 57' 47"

Results
	Winner	Jules Rossi (ITA)
	Second	Albertin Disseaux (BEL)
	Third	Paul Maye (FRA)

The 1938 Paris–Tours was the 33rd edition of the Paris–Tours cycle race and was held on 8 May 1938. The race started in Paris and finished in Tours. The race was won by Jules Rossi.

== General classification ==
Final general classification

Rank	Rider	Time
1	Jules Rossi (ITA)	5h 57' 47"
2	Albertin Disseaux (BEL)	+ 30"
3	Paul Maye (FRA)	+ 1' 42"
4	Raymond Louviot (FRA)	+ 1' 42"
5	Lucien Vlaemynck (BEL)	+ 1' 42"
6	Roger Lapébie (FRA)	+ 1' 42"
7	Marcel Kint (BEL)	+ 2' 31"
8	Lucien Lauk (FRA)	+ 2' 31"
9	René Le Grevès (FRA)	+ 2' 31"
10	Éloi Meulenberg (BEL)	+ 2' 31"
