= 1964 Tour of Flanders =

48th Tour of Flanders
Race details
- Dates: 5 April 1964
- Stages: 1
- Distance: 236 km (146.6 mi)
- Winning time: 5h 43' 27"

Results
	Winner	Rudi Altig (FRG)	(Saint-Raphael–Gitane–Dunlop)
	Second	Benoni Beheyt (BEL)	(Mercier–Hutchinson)
	Third	Jo de Roo (NED)	(Saint-Raphael–Gitane–Hutchinson)

The 48th Tour of Flanders cycling classic was held on Sunday, 5 April 1964. The race was won by West German rider Rudi Altig after a 60 km solo breakaway. At four minutes, Benoni Beheyt won the sprint for second place before Jo de Roo. 51 of 119 riders finished.

== Route ==
The race started in Ghent and finished in Gentbrugge – covering 240 km. There were six categorized climbs:

- Kwaremont
- Kruisberg
- Edelareberg
- Valkenberg
- Kasteelstraat
- Grotenberge

== Results ==
Result
Rank	Rider	Team	Time
1	Rudi Altig (FRG)	Saint-Raphael–Gitane–Dunlop	5h 43' 27"
2	Benoni Beheyt (BEL)	Wiels–Groene Leeuw	+ 4' 05"
3	Jo de Roo (NED)	Saint-Raphael–Gitane–Hutchinson	s.t.
4	Edward Sels (BEL)	Solo–Superia	s.t.
5	Georges Vanconingsloo (BEL)	Peugeot–BP–Englebert	s.t.
6	Arthur Decabooter (BEL)	Solo–Superia	s.t.
7	Jos Verachtert (BEL)	Dr.Mann	s.t.
8	Gustaaf De Smet (BEL)	Wiels–Groene Leeuw	s.t.
9	Gilbert Desmet (BEL)	Wiels–Groene Leeuw	s.t.
10	Rik Van Looy (BEL)	Solo–Superia	s.t.
