= 1955 Paris–Tours =

Race details
- Dates: 9 October 1955
- Stages: 1
- Distance: 253 km (157.2 mi)
- Winning time: 5h 47' 38"

Results
	Winner	Jacques Dupont (FRA)
	Second	Fred De Bruyne (BEL)
	Third	Jean-Marie Cieleska (FRA)

The 1955 Paris–Tours was the 49th edition of the Paris–Tours cycle race and was held on 9 October 1955. The race started in Paris and finished in Tours. The race was won by Jacques Dupont.

== General classification ==
Final general classification

Rank	Rider	Time
1	Jacques Dupont (FRA)	5h 47' 38"
2	Fred De Bruyne (BEL)	+ 0"
3	Jean-Marie Cieleska (FRA)	+ 0"
4	Emiel Van Cauter (BEL)	+ 0"
5	Jozef Sneyers (BEL)	+ 0"
6	Robert Desbats (FRA)	+ 0"
7	Jean Brankart (BEL)	+ 0"
8	Jozef Schils (BEL)	+ 43"
9	Stan Ockers (BEL)	+ 43"
10	Martin Van Geneugden (BEL)	+ 43"
