= Noël Declercq =

Belgian cyclist

Personal information
- Full name: Noël Declercq
- Born: 26 December 1912 Mouscron, Belgium
- Died: 3 May 1945 (aged 32) Baltic Sea, Germany

Cycling career
- Sport: Cycling
- Current team: Retired
- Discipline: Road
- Role: Rider
- Rider type: Classics

Professional teams
- 1936: Mercier–Hutchinson
- 1937: Mercier–Hutchinson
- 1938: Ganna
- 1939: Dossche Sport
- 1940: Alcyon–Dunlop

Noël Declercq (26 December 1912 – 3 May 1945) was a Belgian cyclist. He was one of the victims of the bombing of the SS Cap Arcona and SS Thielbek by the RAF in May 1945. He was one of the prisoners that were being moved from the Neuengamme concentration camp.

== Major results ==
1937
3rd - Paris - Roubaix
1939
10th - Paris - Roubaix

== Giro d'Italia ==
- 1938 - 37th
