= 1941 Paris–Tours =

Race details
- Dates: 11 May 1941
- Stages: 1
- Distance: 249 km (154.7 mi)
- Winning time: 6h 22' 07"

Results
	Winner	Paul Maye (FRA)
	Second	Albert Goutal (FRA)
	Third	Pierre Cloarec (FRA)

The 1941 Paris–Tours was the 35th edition of the Paris–Tours cycle race and was held on 11 May 1941. The race started in Paris and finished in Tours. The race was won by Paul Maye.

== General classification ==
Final general classification

Rank	Rider	Time
1	Paul Maye (FRA)	6h 22' 07"
2	Albert Goutal (FRA)	+ 0"
3	Pierre Cloarec (FRA)	+ 0"
4	Louis Gauthier (FRA)	+ 0"
5	Fernand Mithouard (FRA)	+ 0"
6	Pierre Jaminet (FRA)	+ 0"
7	Yvan Marie (FRA)	+ 0"
8	Eloi Tassin (FRA)	+ 59"
9	Tolmino Casellato (ITA)	+ 2' 23"
10	Marcel Vandevelde (FRA)	+ 2' 47"
