= 1945 Paris–Tours =

Race details
- Dates: 29 April 1945
- Stages: 1
- Distance: 253 km (157.2 mi)
- Winning time: 6h 48' 37"

Results
	Winner	Paul Maye (FRA)
	Second	Joseph Goutorbe (FRA)
	Third	Émile Idée (FRA)

The 1945 Paris–Tours was the 39th edition of the Paris–Tours cycle race and was held on 29 April 1945. The race started in Paris and finished in Tours. The race was won by Paul Maye.

== General classification ==
Final general classification

Rank	Rider	Time
1	Paul Maye (FRA)	6h 48' 37"
2	Joseph Goutorbe (FRA)	+ 0"
3	Émile Idée (FRA)	+ 0"
4	Maurice Desimpelaere (BEL)	+ 0"
5	Robert Renonce (FRA)	+ 0"
6	Louis Thiétard (FRA)	+ 0"
7	Lucien Teisseire (FRA)	+ 0"
8	Urbain Caffi (FRA)	+ 0"
9	Albert Sercu (BEL)	+ 0"
10	Camille Danguillaume (FRA)	+ 0"
