= 2010 Paris–Tours =

Cycling road race in France

The 2010 Paris–Tours was the 104th edition of this single day road bicycle racing event and is organized by the Amaury Sport Organisation (ASO), which also runs the Tour de France. Óscar Freire won the Ruban Jaune as he broke the record for the fastest average speed in a professional cycling race or stage longer than 200 km in 2010 Paris–Tours. Taking advantage of a favourable wind over a new shortened course of 233 kilometres (145 mi), he covered the distance in 4 hours 52 minutes 54 seconds at an average speed of 47.730 kilometres per hour (29.658 mph).

== General standings ==
=== 2010-10-10: La Loupe–Tours, 233 km ===
	Cyclist	Team	Time
1	Óscar Freire (ESP)	Rabobank	4h 52' 54"
2	Angelo Furlan (ITA)	Lampre–Farnese Vini	s.t.
3	Gert Steegmans (BEL)	Team RadioShack	s.t.
4	Klaas Lodewyck (BEL)	Topsport Vlaanderen–Mercator	s.t.
5	Yukiya Arashiro (JPN)	Bbox Bouygues Telecom	s.t.
6	Romain Feillu (FRA)	Vacansoleil	s.t.
7	Yoann Offredo (FRA)	Française des Jeux	s.t.
8	Wouter Weylandt (BEL)	Quick-Step	s.t.
9	Bernhard Eisel (AUT)	Team HTC–Columbia	s.t.
10	Sébastien Chavanel (FRA)	FDJ	s.t.
