= 2015 Paris–Tours =

109th Paris–Tours
2015 UCI Europe Tour

Race details
- Dates: 11 October 2015
- Stages: 1
- Distance: 231 km (143.5 mi)
- Winning time: 4h 39' 12"

Results
	Winner	Matteo Trentin (ITA)	(Etixx–Quick-Step)
	Second	Tosh Van der Sande (BEL)	(Lotto–Soudal)
	Third	Greg Van Avermaet (BEL)	(BMC Racing Team)

The 109th edition of the Paris–Tours cycling classic was held on 11 October 2015. The race was part of the 2015 UCI Europe Tour, ranked as a 1.HC event.

Italian rider Matteo Trentin won the race in a three-man sprint with Belgians Tosh Van der Sande and Greg Van Avermaet. At an average speed of 49.64 km/h (30.84 mph), it was the fastest edition in the history of Paris–Tours, surpassing the previous record set by Marco Marcato in 2012, and thus earning Trentin the Ruban Jaune.

== Teams ==
Twenty-three teams started the race. Each team had a maximum of eight riders:

UCI WorldTeams

- AG2R La Mondiale
- Etixx–Quick-Step
- IAM Cycling
- Team Giant–Alpecin
- Tinkoff–Saxo
- BMC Racing Team
- FDJ
- Lotto–Soudal
- LottoNL–Jumbo
- Trek Factory Racing

UCI Professional Continental teams

- Bora–Argon 18
- Cofidis
- MTN–Qhubeka
- Team Novo Nordisk
- Wanty–Groupe Gobert
- Bretagne–Séché Environnement
- Team Europcar
- Team Roompot
- Topsport Vlaanderen–Baloise

UCI Continental teams

- Armée de Terre
- Team Marseille 13 KTM
- Auber 93
- Roubaix–Lille Métropole

== Results ==
Final general classification

Rank	Rider	Team	Time
1	Matteo Trentin (ITA)	Etixx–Quick-Step	4h 39' 12"
2	Tosh Van der Sande (BEL)	Lotto–Soudal	s.t.
3	Greg Van Avermaet (BEL)	BMC Racing Team	+ 4"
4	Tiesj Benoot (BEL)	Lotto–Soudal	+ 20"
5	Roy Jans (BEL)	Wanty–Groupe Gobert	s.t.
6	Yves Lampaert (BEL)	Etixx–Quick-Step	s.t.
7	Heinrich Haussler (AUS)	IAM Cycling	s.t.
8	Edward Theuns (BEL)	Topsport Vlaanderen–Baloise	s.t.
9	Mike Teunissen (NED)	LottoNL–Jumbo	s.t.
10	Pim Ligthart (NED)	Lotto–Soudal	s.t.
