= 1934 Paris–Tours =

Race details
- Dates: 29 April 1934
- Stages: 1
- Distance: 243 km (151.0 mi)
- Winning time: 6h 20' 10"

Results
| | Winner | Gustave Danneels (BEL) |
| | Second | Romain Gijssels (BEL) |
| | Third | Félicien Vervaecke (BEL) |

The 1934 Paris–Tours was the 29th edition of the Paris–Tours cycle race and was held on 29 April 1934. The race started in Paris and finished in Tours. The race was won by Gustave Danneels.

== General classification ==
Final general classification

| Rank | Rider | Time |
|---|---|---|
| 1 | Gustave Danneels (BEL) | 6h 20' 10" |
| 2 | Romain Gijssels (BEL) | + 17" |
| 3 | Félicien Vervaecke (BEL) | + 17" |
| 4 | Jef Demuysere (BEL) | + 17" |
| 5 | Robert Rigaux (FRA) | + 1' 12" |
| 6 | André Leducq (FRA) | + 1' 12" |
| 7 | Edgard De Caluwé (BEL) | + 1' 12" |
| 8 | Pierre Cloarec (FRA) | + 1' 12" |
| 9 | Raymond Louviot (FRA) | + 1' 55" |
| 10 | René Bernard (FRA) | + 1' 55" |
