= 1972 Paris–Tours =

Race details
- Dates: 1 October 1972
- Stages: 1
- Distance: 292 km (181.4 mi)
- Winning time: 7h 10' 41"

Results
	Winner	Noël Vantyghem (BEL)
	Second	Jos Huysmans (BEL)
	Third	Willy De Geest (BEL)

The 1972 Paris–Tours was the 66th edition of the Paris–Tours cycle race and was held on 1 October 1972. The race started in Paris and finished in Tours. The race was won by Noël Vantyghem.

== General classification ==
Final general classification

Rank	Rider	Time
1	Noël Vantyghem (BEL)	7h 10' 41"
2	Jos Huysmans (BEL)	+ 0"
3	Willy De Geest (BEL)	+ 0"
4	Roger De Vlaeminck (BEL)	+ 7"
5	Cees Koeken (NED)	+ 1' 47"
6	Guido Reybrouck (BEL)	+ 1' 47"
7	Cyrille Guimard (FRA)	+ 1' 47"
8	Rik Van Linden (BEL)	+ 1' 47"
9	Barry Hoban (GBR)	+ 1' 47"
10	Walter Planckaert (BEL)	+ 1' 47"
