= 1926 Paris–Tours =

Race details
- Dates: 2 May 1926
- Stages: 1
- Distance: 324 km (201.3 mi)
- Winning time: 11h 28' 37"

Results
	Winner	Heiri Suter (SUI)
	Second	Kastor Notter (SUI)
	Third	Nicolas Frantz (LUX)

The 1926 Paris–Tours was the 21st edition of the Paris–Tours cycle race and was held on 2 May 1926. The race started in Paris and finished in Tours. The race was won by Heiri Suter.

== General classification ==
Final general classification

Rank	Rider	Time
1	Heiri Suter (SUI)	11h 28' 37"
2	Kastor Notter (SUI)	+ 0"
3	Nicolas Frantz (LUX)	+ 3' 55"
4	Joseph Curtel (FRA)	+ 3' 55"
5	Julien Delbecque (BEL)	+ 3' 55"
6	Achille Souchard (FRA)	+ 6' 38"
7	Leopold Matton (BEL)	+ 6' 38"
8	Gaston Rebry (BEL)	+ 6' 38"
9	Léon Parmentier (BEL)	+ 6' 38"
10	Albert Dejonghe (BEL)	+ 6' 38"
