= August Mortelmans =

Belgian cyclist

- Mortelmans in 1927

Personal information
- Full name: August Mortelmans
- Born: 24 April 1901 Kerkom-bij-Sint-Truiden, Belgium
- Died: 8 October 1985 (aged 84) Lier, Belgium

Cycling career
- Sport: Cycling
- Role: Rider

Professional teams
- 1924: Independent
- 1925: J.B. Louvet
- 1926: Automoto, Christophe-Hutchinson
- 1927: J.B. Louvet
- 1928: Independent
- 1929: Génial Lucifer-Hutchinson
- 1930–31: Independent
- 1932: Wonder
- 1933–35: Victory

Major wins
- One-day races and Classics National Road Race Championships (1927)

August Mortelmans (24 April 1901 – 8 October 1985) was a Belgian racing cyclist. He won the Belgian national road race title in 1927.

== Major results ==
1922
2nd Bruxelles-Luxembourg-Mondorf
1923
3rd Munich-Zurich
1924
1st Bruxelles-Liège
2nd Binche–Chimay–Binche
1925
2nd Paris–Tours
1926
3rd Schaal Sels
1927
1st Belgian National Road Race Championships, road race
1st Heistse Pijl
1st Stage 3 Tour of Belgium
1928
1st Heistse Pijl
2nd Tour of Flanders
3rd Bruxelles-Paris
1929
3rd De Drie Zustersteden
3rd Bruxelles-Paris
1930
1st Heistse Pijl
1931
3rd Six Days of Saint-Étienne (with Armand Haesendonck)
1932
1st Heistse Pijl
3rd Schaal Sels
