= 1896 Paris–Tours =

Race details
- Dates: 17 May 1896
- Stages: 1
- Distance: 250 km (160 mi)
- Winning time: 8h 08' 00"

Results
	Winner	Eugène Prévost (FRA)
	Second	Émile Ouzou (FRA)
	Third	Lucien Bouvet (FRA)

The 1896 Paris–Tours was the inaugural edition of the Paris–Tours cycle race and was held on 17 May 1896. The race started in Paris and finished in Tours. The race was won by Eugène Prévost.

== General classification ==
Final general classification

Rank	Rider	Time
1	Eugène Prévost (FRA)	8h 08' 00"
2	Émile Ouzou (FRA)	+ 11' 00"
3	Lucien Bouvet (FRA)	+ 26' 00"
4	Pigelet (FRA)	+ 38' 00"
5	Sigouard (FRA)	+ 42' 00"
6	Vernet (FRA)	+ 44' 00"
7	Haralamb (FRA)	+ 44' 00"
8	Loysel (FRA)	+ 57' 00"
9	Bonne (FRA)	+ 57' 00"
10	Delalande (FRA)	+ 1h 06' 00"
