= Alcide Cerato =

Italian bicycle racer (1939–2026)

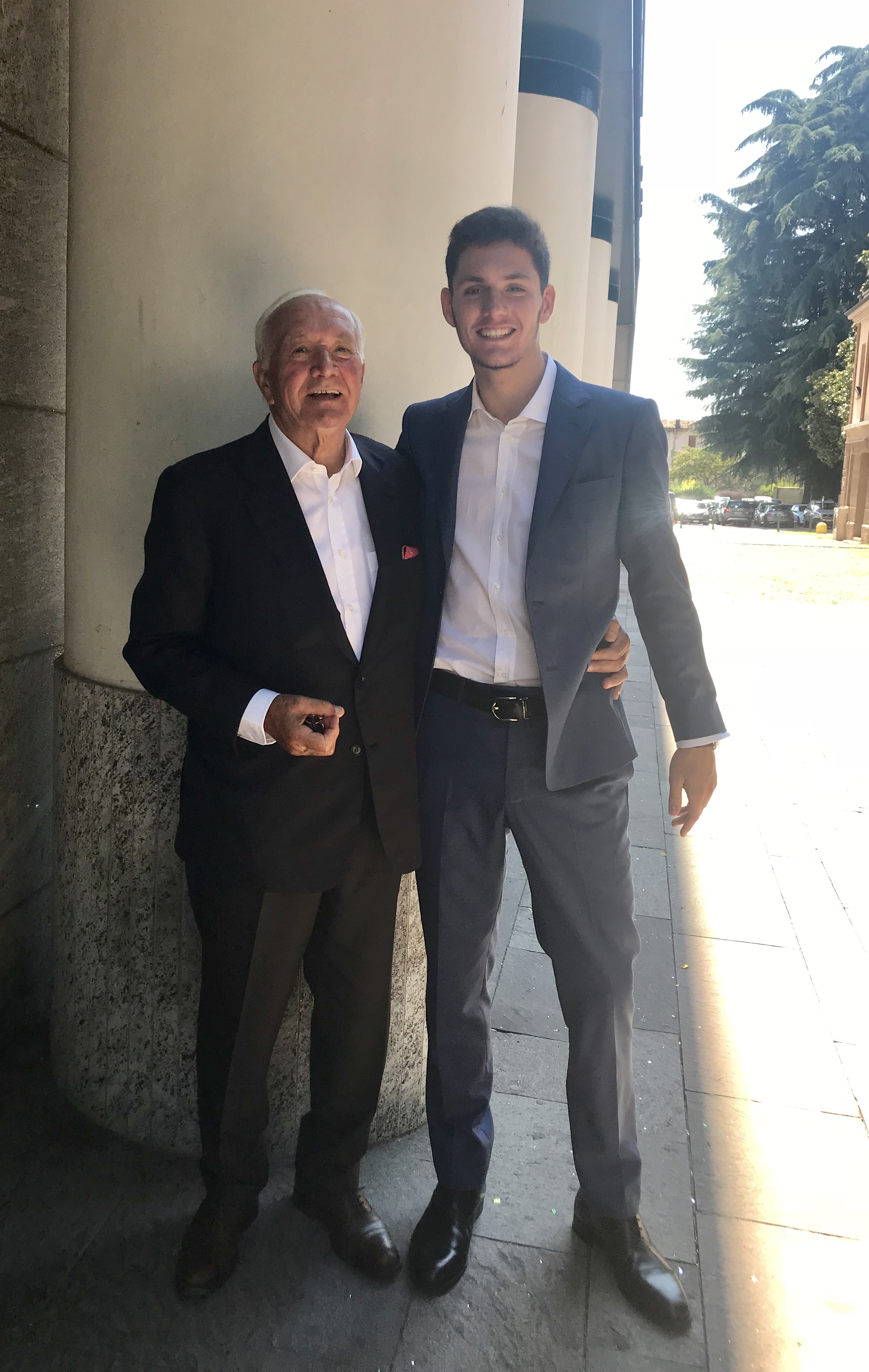
- Cerato (left) in 2018

Personal information
- Born: 11 March 1939 Legnaro, Italy
- Died: 23 August 2026 (aged 87) Olbia, Italy

Cycling career
- Sport: Cycling
- Discipline: Road
- Role: Rider

Professional teams
- 1961–1963: Molteni
- 1964: Cite

Alcide Cerato (11 February 1939 – 23 August 2026) was an Italian professional road cyclist and businessman. Professional from 1961 to 1964, he notably finished third in the 1962 Giro di Lombardia. He also rode in the 1962 and 1963 Giro d'Italia.

In 1964, his career was cut short by a bad crash in the Giro di Lombardia, and he went on to take over his father-in-law's funeral home business, and soon after founded the company Impresa San Siro in Milan.

Cerato died in Olbia on 23 August 2026, at the age of 87.

== Major results ==
1959
1st Gran Premio Città di Camaiore
1962
2nd Giro del Trentino
2nd Coppa Placci
3rd Giro di Lombardia
1963
3rd Coppa Placci
3rd Individual pursuit, National Track Championships
