= Amy Cerato =

American civil engineer

Amy B. Cerato is an American civil engineer focused on geotechnical engineering, including soil mechanics, soil stabilization, and expansive soil. She is the Rapp Foundation Presidential Professor of Civil Engineering at the University of Oklahoma.

== Education and career ==
Cerato grew up in rural Pennsylvania. She majored in civil engineering at Lafayette College, a private liberal arts college in Pennsylvania, where she graduated in 1999. She continued her studies at the University of Massachusetts Amherst, where she received a master's degree in civil engineering in 2001, a second master's degree in geosciences in 2004, and a Ph.D. in geotechnical engineering in 2005.

She joined the University of Oklahoma as an assistant professor of civil engineering in 2005. She was promoted to associate professor in 2011 and full professor in 2016. She was given the Rapp Foundation Presidential Professorship in 2009.

Cerato is also a licensed professional engineer in Oklahoma, and since 2014 she has consulted in geotechnical engineering through her firm, Cerato Geotechnical Engineering, PLLC.

== Recognition ==
Cerato was a 2004–2005 Selected Professions Fellow of the American Association of University Women. She was a 2009 recipient of the Presidential Early Career Award for Scientists and Engineers, given "for innovative research on the micro-level understanding of the behavior of expansive soils leading toward development of models to predict soil response to moisture changes, and for educational and outreach activities to bring an appreciation of engineering's role in society to K-12 students".

She was one of two 2010 winners of the Arthur Casagrande Professional Development Award of the American Society of Civil Engineers. In 2011 the University of Massachusetts Amherst Riccio College of Engineering gave her their Outstanding Young Alumni Award. She was the 2015 recipient of the Shamsher Prakash Foundation Prize for Excellence in Teaching of Geotechnical Engineering.

== Personal life ==
Cerato is the president of Pike Off OTA, an Oklahoma environmental group that opposes highway construction by the Oklahoma Turnpike Authority.
