= Paris–Tours =

French one-day road cycling race

Race details
- Date: Mid-October
- Region: Chevreuse to Loire, France
- Competition: UCI ProSeries
- Type: One-day
- Organiser: Amaury Sport Organisation
- Web site: www.paris-tours.fr/en/

History
- First edition: 1896
- Editions: 120 (as of 2026)
- First winner: Eugène Prévost (FRA)
- Most wins: 3 wins: Gustave Danneels (BEL); Paul Maye (FRA); Guido Reybrouck (BEL); Erik Zabel (GER); Matteo Trentin (ITA)
- Most recent: Per Strand Hagenes (NOR)

Paris–Tours is a French one-day classic road cycling race held every October from the outskirts of Paris to the cathedral city of Tours. It is a predominantly flat course through the Chevreuse and Loire valleys; the highest point is 200 m, at Le Gault-du-Perche. Historically, it is known as a "Sprinters' Classic" because it frequently ends in a bunch sprint at the finish, in Tours. Since 2018, the course has featured gravel sectors in vineyards near Tours.

For several decades the race arrived on the 2.7 km long Avenue de Grammont, one of cycling's best-known finishing straits, particularly renowned among sprinters. Since 2011 the finish was moved to a different location because a new tram line was built on the Avenue de Grammont.

== History ==
Paris–Tours was first run for amateurs in 1896, making it one of the oldest cycling races in the world. It was organised by the magazine Paris-Vélo, which described that edition won by Eugène Prévost as, "A crazy, unheard of, unhoped for success". It was five years before the race was run again and a further five years (1906) before it became an annual event for professionals, with L'Auto as organiser. L’Auto ran the Tour de France (TDF) and Paris–Tours is still run by the Tour organiser, Amaury Sport Organisation.

The race was part of the UCI Road World Cup from 1989 to 2004, and the UCI ProTour from 2005 to 2007. From 2008 to 2019 it was part of the UCI Europe Tour before joining the UCI ProSeries in 2020.

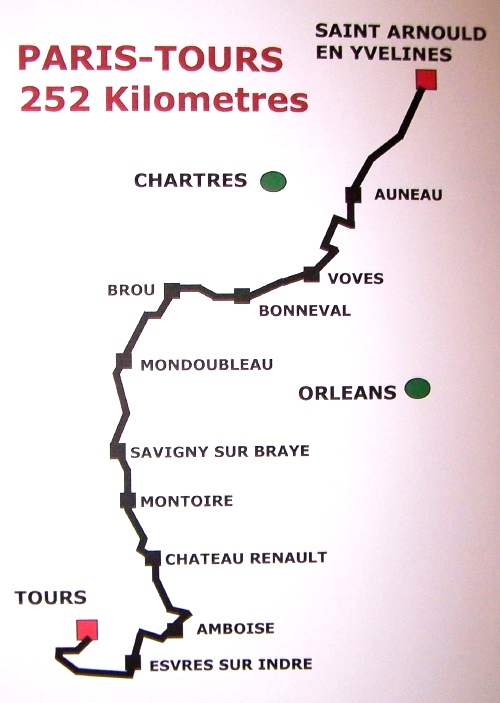
Paris–Tours now starts in Saint-Arnoult-en-Yvelines 50km south-west of Paris, runs south-west towards Tours crossing the Loire at Amboise, then over several small climbs before the finish on the Avenue de Grammont in Tours

== The route ==
Paris–Tours has had many route changes although the distance has remained about 250 km. The start was moved out of Paris in the early days, first to Versailles, then to at Saint-Arnoult-en-Yvelines. Since 2009, the route has started in the Department of Eure-et-Loir. A loop through Chinon was added between 1919 and 1926 to make the approach to Tours hilly lanes on the south bank of the Loire and the total distance 342 km. Sprinters continued to dominate and in 1959 the organisers added three ascents of the Alouette Hill. It made little difference.

In 1965 dérailleurs were banned and riders were limited to two gears. The race was won by Dutch first-year professional Gerben Karstens who chose 53/16 and 53/15, covering 246 km at a record 45.029 km/h. The experiment was judged a failure when the 1966 race ended the same way as 1964.

The course was reversed and the route constantly changed between 1974 and 1987. It was sometimes known as the Grand Prix d'Automne and sometimes by the names of the start and finish towns. For many the event lost character as the race was run between Tours and Versailles (1974–75) Blois and Chaville (1976–77 and 1979–84), Blois to Autodrome de Montlhéry (1978) and Créteil to Chaville (1985–87). In 1988 the race reverted to its original Paris–Tours route.

The wind can often be hostile; in 1988 Peter Pieters averaged just 34kmh, slowest for 57 years. However, Paris–Tours becomes the fastest classic when the wind is behind the riders, Óscar Freire winning in 2010 at 47.730kmh. It gave him the Ruban Jaune or "Yellow Riband" for the fastest speed in a classic, in fact the Ruban Jaune has been awarded nine times (as of 2016) to riders winning Paris–Tours and posting the fastest time in a professional race.

The route for the 2018 edition of the race was changed radically with the race starting in Chartres and incorporating 12.5 kilometres' of unpaved gravel tracks inside the final 60 kilometres as the race winds it way around vineyards in the Tours area. Seven new punchy climbs were also included in the finale of the race which was reduced to a distance of 211 kilometres to compensate for the additional difficulties.

== Classic races and riders ==
The 1921 edition had blizzards. Half the field abandoned in Chartres. The winner, Francis Pélissier, punctured late in the race; his hands frozen, he tore the tyre off the rim with his teeth. Riding on the rim, he caught Eugène Christophe and soloed to the finish. Rik Van Looy won the 1959 race, the first to feature the Alouette Hill. One of the best sprinters of his day, Van Looy dropped two others on the second ascent and won alone.

The record for the most victories is three, held by Gustave Danneels (1934, 1936, 1937), Paul Maye (1941, 1942, 1945), Guido Reybrouck (1964, 1966, 1968) and Erik Zabel (1994, 2003, 2005).

Eddy Merckx never won Paris–Tours; he could have triumphed in 1968 but handed victory to teammate Guido Reybrouck, pulling out of the sprint, to thank him for help earlier in the season. Later, Noël Vantyghem (winner of the 1972 edition) said "Together with Eddy Merckx, I won all classics races that could be won. I won Paris-Tours, he the rest."

Erik Zabel took his first big victory at Paris–Tours in 1994. He won Paris–Tours again in 2003 and 2005. Jacky Durand, Andrea Tafi, Marc Wauters, Richard Virenque, Erik Dekker and Philippe Gilbert (two times) have all won solo or from a small group, denying sprinters a chance. Virenque had just returned from a drugs ban. He broke away with Durand shortly after the start and stayed away despite Durand's dropping back outside Tours.

== The Autumn Double ==
The Autumn Double refers to Paris–Tours and the Giro di Lombardia, considered cycling's most important classics in Autumn, run within a week of each other in October. The races are different – Lombardia is for climbers – making the double difficult. Only four have achieved it in the same year: Belgians Philippe Thys in 1917 and Rik Van Looy in 1959, Dutchman Jo de Roo twice (1962–1963) and Belgian Philippe Gilbert in 2009.

== Results ==
=== List of winners ===
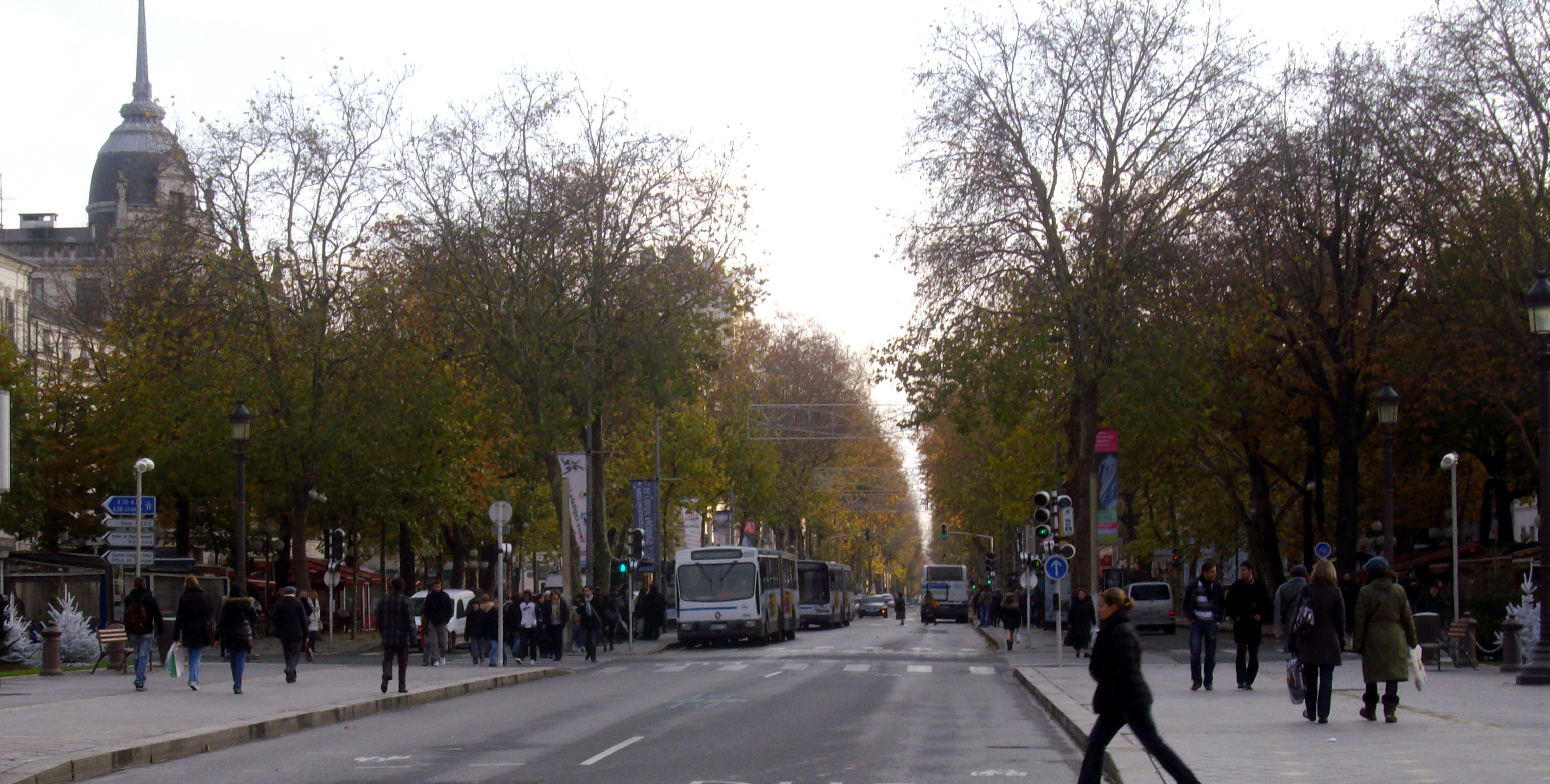
Avenue de Grammont in October, scene of the finish of Paris-Tours until 2010

Year	Country	Rider	Team
1896	France	Eugène Prévost	individual
1901	France	Jean Fischer	individual
1906	France	Lucien Petit-Breton	Peugeot
1907	France	Georges Passerieu	Peugeot–Wolber
1908	France	Omer Beaugendre	Peugeot–Wolber
1909	Luxembourg	François Faber	Alcyon–Dunlop
1910	Luxembourg	François Faber	Alcyon–Dunlop
1911	France	Octave Lapize	La Française–Diamant
1912	Belgium	Louis Heusghem	Alcyon–Dunlop
1913	France	Charles Crupelandt	La Française–Diamant
1914	Switzerland	Oscar Egg	Peugeot–Lion
1917	Belgium	Philippe Thys	Peugeot–Wolber
1918	France	Charles Mantelet	individual
1919	Belgium	Hector Tiberghien	individual
1920	France	Eugène Christophe	individual
1921	France	Francis Pélissier	J.B. Louvet
1922	France	Henri Pélissier	J.B. Louvet
1923	Belgium	Paul Deman	O. Lapize
1924	Belgium	Louis Mottiat	Alcyon–Dunlop
1925	Belgium	Denis Verschueren	Wonder
1926	Switzerland	Heiri Suter	Olympique–Wolber
1927	Switzerland	Heiri Suter	Olympique–Wolber
1928	Belgium	Denis Verschueren	J.B. Louvet
1929	Luxembourg	Nicolas Frantz	Alcyon–Dunlop
1930	France	Jean Maréchal	Colin–Wolber
1931	France	André Leducq	Alcyon–Dunlop
1932	France	Jules Moineau	France Sport–Dunlop
1933	France	Jules Merviel	Colin–Wolber
1934	Belgium	Gustave Danneels	Alcyon–Dunlop
1935	France	René Le Grevès	Alcyon–Dunlop
1936	Belgium	Gustave Danneels	Alcyon–Dunlop
1937	Belgium	Gustave Danneels	Alcyon–Dunlop
1938	Italy	Jules Rossi	Alcyon–Dunlop
1939	Belgium	Frans Bonduel	Dilecta–Wolber
1941	France	Paul Maye	Alcyon–Dunlop
1942	France	Paul Maye	Alcyon–Dunlop
1943	France	Gabriel Gaudin	Peugeot–Dunlop
1944	France	Lucien Teisseire	France Sport–Dunlop
1945	France	Paul Maye	Alcyon–Dunlop
1946	Belgium	Alberic Schotte	Alcyon–Dunlop
1947	Belgium	Alberic Schotte	Alcyon–Dunlop
1948	France	Louis Caput	Olympia–Dunlop
1949	Belgium	Albrecht Ramon	Bertin–Wolber
1950	France	André Mahé	Stella–Dunlop
1951	France	Jacques Dupont	Peugeot–Dunlop
1952	France	Raymond Guegan	Gitane
1953	Belgium	Jozef Schils	Bianchi–Pirelli
1954	France	Gilbert Scodeller	Mercier–BP–Hutchinson
1955	France	Jacques Dupont	La Perle–Hutchinson
1956	France	Albert Bouvet	Mercier–BP–Hutchinson
1957	Belgium	Fred De Bruyne	Carpano–Coppi
1958	Belgium	Gilbert Desmet	Faema
1959	Belgium	Rik Van Looy	Faema
1960	Netherlands	Jo de Haan	Rapha–Gitane
1961	Belgium	Joseph Wouters	Solo–Terrot–Van Steenbergen
1962	Netherlands	Jo de Roo	Saint-Raphaël–Helyett–Hutchinson
1963	Netherlands	Jo de Roo	Saint-Raphaël–Gitane-Geminiani
1964	Belgium	Guido Reybroeck	Flandria–Romeo
1965	Netherlands	Gerben Karstens	Televizier
1966	Belgium	Guido Reybroeck	Romeo–Smith's
1967	Belgium	Rik Van Looy	Willem II–Gazelle
1968	Belgium	Guido Reybroeck	Faema
1969	Belgium	Herman Van Springel	Dr.Mann–Grundig
1970	West Germany	Jürgen Tschan	Peugeot–BP–Michelin
1971	Belgium	Rik van Linden	Hertekamp–Magniflex–Novy
1972	Belgium	Noël Vantyghem	Novy–Dubble Bubble
1973	Belgium	Rik van Linden	Rokado
1974	Italy	Francesco Moser	Filotex
1975	Belgium	Freddy Maertens	Flandria–Carpenter
1976	Belgium	Ronald Dewitte	Brooklyn
1977	Netherlands	Joop Zoetemelk	Gan–Mercier
1978	Netherlands	Jan Raas	TI–Raleigh
1979	Netherlands	Joop Zoetemelk	Gan–Mercier
1980	Belgium	Daniel Willems	IJsboerke–Warncke
1981	Netherlands	Jan Raas	TI–Raleigh
1982	Belgium	Jean-Luc Vandenbroucke	La Redoute
1983	Belgium	Ludo Peeters	TI–Raleigh
1984	Ireland	Sean Kelly	Skil–Sem
1985	Belgium	Ludo Peeters	Kwantum Hallen
1986	Australia	Phil Anderson	Panasonic
1987	Netherlands	Adri van der Poel	PDM–Concorde
1988	Netherlands	Peter Pieters	TVM–Van Schilt
1989	Netherlands	Jelle Nijdam	Superconfex–Yoko–Opel–Colnago
1990	Denmark	Rolf Sørensen	Ariostea
1991	Belgium	Johan Capiot	TVM–Sanyo
1992	Belgium	Hendrik Redant	Lotto–Mavic–MBK
1993	Belgium	Johan Museeuw	GB–MG Maglificio
1994	Germany	Erik Zabel	Team Telekom
1995	Italy	Nicola Minali	Gewiss-Ballan
1996	Italy	Nicola Minali	Gewiss-Playbus
1997	Ukraine	Andrei Tchmil	Lotto–Mobistar–Isoglass
1998	France	Jacky Durand	Casino–Ag2r
1999	Belgium	Marc Wauters	Rabobank
2000	Italy	Andrea Tafi	Mapei–Quick-Step
2001	France	Richard Virenque	Domo–Farm Frites
2002	Denmark	Jakob Piil	CSC–Tiscali
2003	Germany	Erik Zabel	Team Telekom
2004	Netherlands	Erik Dekker	Rabobank
2005	Germany	Erik Zabel	T-Mobile Team
2006	France	Frédéric Guesdon	Française des Jeux
2007	Italy	Alessandro Petacchi	Team Milram
2008	Belgium	Philippe Gilbert	Française des Jeux
2009	Belgium	Philippe Gilbert	Silence–Lotto
2010	Spain	Oscar Freire	Rabobank
2011	Belgium	Greg Van Avermaet	BMC Racing Team
2012	Italy	Marco Marcato	Vacansoleil–DCM
2013	Germany	John Degenkolb	Argos–Shimano
2014	Belgium	Jelle Wallays	Topsport Vlaanderen–Baloise
2015	Italy	Matteo Trentin	Etixx–Quick-Step
2016	Colombia	Fernando Gaviria	Etixx–Quick-Step
2017	Italy	Matteo Trentin	Quick-Step Floors
2018	Denmark	Søren Kragh Andersen	Team Sunweb
2019	Belgium	Jelle Wallays	Lotto–Soudal
2020	Denmark	Casper Pedersen	Team Sunweb
2021	France	Arnaud Démare	Groupama–FDJ
2022	France	Arnaud Démare	Groupama–FDJ
2023	United States	Riley Sheehan	Israel–Premier Tech
2024	France	Christophe Laporte	Visma–Lease a Bike
2025	Italy	Matteo Trentin	Tudor Pro Cycling Team
2026	Norway	Per Strand Hagenes	Visma–Lease a Bike

=== Multiple winners ===
Riders in italics are still active

Wins	Rider	Nationality	Editions
3	Gustave Danneels	Belgium	1934 + 1936 + 1937
3	Paul Maye	France	1941 + 1942 + 1945
3	Guido Reybrouck	Belgium	1964 + 1966 + 1968
3	Erik Zabel	Germany	1994 + 2003 + 2005
3	Matteo Trentin	Italy	2015 + 2017 + 2025
2	François Faber	Luxembourg	1909 + 1910
2	Denis Verschueren	Belgium	1925 + 1928
2	Heiri Suter	Switzerland	1926 + 1927
2	Briek Schotte	Belgium	1946 + 1947
2	Jacques Dupont	France	1951 + 1955
2	Rik Van Looy	Belgium	1959 + 1967
2	Jo de Roo	Netherlands	1962 + 1963
2	Rik Van Linden	Belgium	1971 + 1973
2	Joop Zoetemelk	Netherlands	1977 + 1979
2	Jan Raas	Netherlands	1978 + 1981
2	Ludo Peeters	Belgium	1983 + 1985
2	Nicola Minali	Italy	1995 + 1996
2	Philippe Gilbert	Belgium	2008 + 2009
2	Jelle Wallays	Belgium	2014 + 2019
2	Arnaud Démare	France	2021 + 2022

=== Wins per country ===
Wins	Country
42	Belgium
34	France
12	Netherlands
10	Italy
5	Germany (including West Germany)
4	Denmark
3	Luxembourg; Switzerland
1	Australia; Colombia; Ireland; Norway; Spain; Ukraine; United States

=== Tours–Paris ===
In 1917 and 1918 a race was held from Tours–Paris as well as Paris–Tours.

The winners of Tours–Paris were:

Year	Country	Rider	Team
1917	Belgium	Charles Deruyter	
1918	Belgium	Philippe Thys	
