= Gustave Danneels =

Belgian cyclist

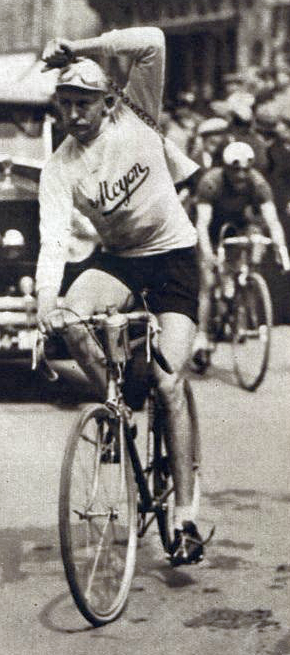
- Danneels in 1934

Personal information
- Full name: Gustave Danneels
- Born: 6 September 1913 Loos-en-Gohelle, France
- Died: 13 April 1976 (aged 62) Knokke, Belgium

Cycling career
- Sport: Cycling
- Discipline: Road
- Role: Rider

Major wins
- Paris–Tours (1934, 1936, 1937)
Medal record
Men's road bicycle racing
Representing Belgium
World Championships
Bronze medal – third place	1934 Leipzig	Elite Men's Road Race
Bronze medal – third place	1935 Floreffe	Elite Men's Road Race

Gustave Danneels (6 September 1913 – 13 April 1976) was a Belgian professional road bicycle racer. He is known for bronze medals in the 1934 and the 1935 UCI Road World Championships and his victories in Paris–Tours. When winning the 1936 edition of Paris-Tours Danneels was awarded the Ruban Jaune for recording the fastest time in a professional race.

== Major results ==
1931
Belgium U17 Road Race Champion
1933
Belgium Independent Road Race Champion
1934
Paris–Tours
GP d'Europe
(bronze) World Road Race Championship
1935
Belgium Road Race Champion
Winner Stage 2, Tour of Belgium
(bronze) World Road Race Championship
1936
Paris–Tours
Winner stages 3 and 6 Paris–Nice
1937
Paris–Tours
Tour de France:

Winner stage 11B

1938
Winner stages 4 & 5, Tour du Sud-Ouest

== Notes ==
Sporting positions
Preceded by Jules Merviel	Winner of Paris–Tours; 1934	Succeeded by René Le Grevès
Preceded by René Le Grevès	Winner of Paris–Tours; 1936–1937	Succeeded by Jules Rossi
