= Marius Gallottini =

Italian cyclist

Personal information
- Born: 10 November 1904
- Died: 3 October 2001 (aged 96)

Cycling career
- Sport: Cycling
- Discipline: Road
- Role: Rider

Marius Gallottini (10 November 1904 – 3 October 2001) was an Italian racing cyclist. He rode in the 1927 Tour de France.
