= Joseph Goutorbe =

French cyclist (1916–2002)

Personal information
- Born: 25 April 1916 Fleury, France
- Died: 14 March 2002 (aged 85) Saussay, France

Cycling career
- Sport: Cycling
- Discipline: Road
- Role: Rider

Professional teams
- 1938–1939: Helyett–Hutchinson
- 1940: Individual
- 1941–1943: Mercier–Hutchinson
- 1944: A. Trialoux–Wolber
- 1945–1946: Métropole–Dunlop
- 1947: La Perle–Hutchinson
- 1948: Dilecta–J.B. Louvet–Wolber
- 1949–1950: Dilecta-Wolber
- 1951–1953: Individual

Joseph Goutorbe (25 April 1916 – 14 March 2002) was a French racing cyclist. He rode in the 1938 Tour de France. He most notably won the Paris–Camembert in 1942 and the Critérium National de la Route in 1945.

== Major results ==
1942
1st Paris–Camembert
1943
1st Grand Prix du Tour de France
7th Critérium National de la Route
10th Paris–Roubaix
1945
1st Critérium National de la Route
2nd Paris–Tours
3rd Road race, National Road Championships
