= Fernand Mithouard =

French cyclist

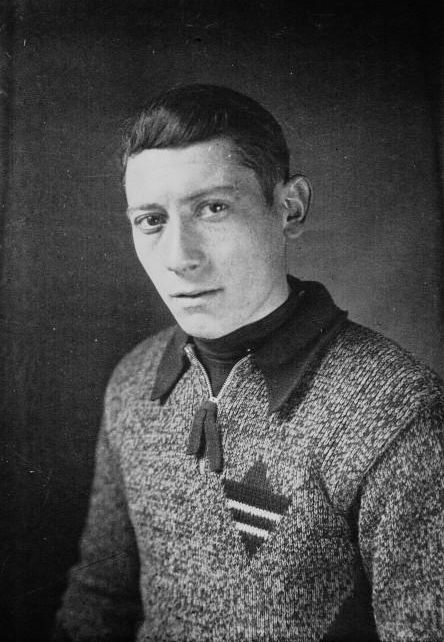

Personal information
- Full name: Fernand Mithouard
- Born: 22 May 1909 Chevreuse, France
- Died: 10 December 1993 (aged 84) Chevreuse, France

Cycling career
- Sport: Cycling
- Discipline: Road
- Role: Rider

Professional teams
- 1933: Lutetia-Wolber
- 1933-1934: F.Pélissier-Mercier-Hutchinson
- 1935: F.Pelissier-Hutchinson
- 1936-1937: La Française-Dunlop
- 1938-1943: La Française
- 1942-1943: Alcyon-Dunlop
- 1944: La Française-Dunlop
- 1945-1947: Alcyon-Dunlop

Managerial team
- 1947-1957: Alcyon-Dunlop

Major wins
- Bordeaux-Paris (1933)

Fernand Mithouard (22 May 1909 – 10 December 1993) was a French professional cyclist who won the Bordeaux-Paris in 1933.

In 1934 Mithouard traveled to Australia with Paul Chocque to compete in the Centenary 1000, one week road bicycle race over seven stages covering 1,102 miles (1,773 km). The race was part of the celebrations of the Centenary of Victoria. Mithouard was leading the championship when he crashed in stage 6 and abandoned at Omeo.

== Palmarès ==
- 1931
  - 3rd Paris-Reims
- 1932
  - Paris-Argentan
  - Paris-Chateau Thierry
  - Paris-Évreux
- 1933
  - Bordeaux-Paris
  - 4th Grand Prix des Nations
- 1934
  - 1st Critérium de l'Écho d'Alger
  - Centenary 1000
- 1935
  - 5th Grand Prix des Nations
- 1936
  - 2ndParis-Tours
  - 2nd Critérium national
  - 6th Grand Prix des Nations
- 1937
  - 2nd stage Paris-Nice
  - 9th Grand Prix des Nations
- 1939
  - Paris-Saint-Etienne
    - General Classification
    - 1st stage
  - 3rd Tour de Luxembourg
- 1941
  - 2nd Grand Prix des Nations (free zone)
  - 5th Paris-Tours
  - 6thGrand Prix des Nations (occupied zone)
- 1942
  - 6th Grand Prix des Nations (occupied zone)
- 1943
  - La Flèche française

== Results in the Grand tours ==
=== Tour de France ===
- 1936 : abandoned (Stage 7)
- 1939 : abandoned (Stage 5)
