= Gérard Virol =

French cyclist

Personal information
- Born: 13 December 1913
- Died: 17 November 1996 (aged 82)

Cycling career
- Sport: Cycling
- Discipline: Road
- Role: Rider

Gérard Virol (13 December 1913 – 17 November 1996) was a French racing cyclist. He rode in the 1939 Tour de France.
