= 1962 Giro di Lombardia =

Race details
- Dates: 20 October 1962
- Stages: 1
- Distance: 253 km (157.2 mi)
- Winning time: 7h 05' 58"

Results
	Winner	Jo de Roo (NED)	(Saint-Raphaël–Helyett–Hutchinson)
	Second	Livio Trapè (ITA)	(Ghigi)
	Third	Alcide Cerato (ITA)	(Molteni)

The 1962 Giro di Lombardia was the 56th edition of the Giro di Lombardia cycle race and was held on 20 October 1962. The race started in Milan and finished in Como. The race was won by Jo de Roo of the Saint-Raphaël team.

== General classification ==
Final general classification

Rank	Rider	Team	Time
1	Jo de Roo (NED)	Saint-Raphaël–Helyett–Hutchinson	7h 05' 58"
2	Livio Trapè (ITA)	Ghigi	+ 0"
3	Alcide Cerato (ITA)	Molteni	+ 51"
4	Emile Daems (BEL)	Philco	+ 51"
5	Vito Taccone (ITA)	Atala	+ 1' 57"
6	Angelo Conterno (ITA)	Carpano	+ 2' 12"
7	Ercole Baldini (ITA)	Ignis–Moschettieri	+ 2' 24"
8	Armand Desmet (BEL)	Flandria–Faema–Clément	+ 2' 24"
9	Jos Hoevenaers (BEL)	Philco	+ 3' 37"
10	Idrio Bui (ITA)	Ignis–Moschettieri	+ 3' 37"
