= Paul Maye =

French cyclist

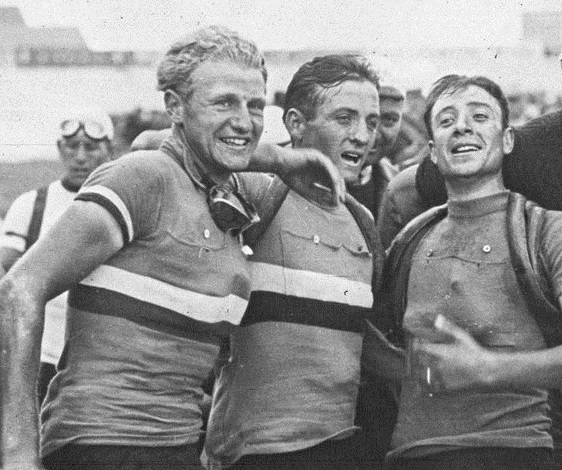
- Raoul Lesueur (left), Maye (center), and the French Sauveur Ducazeaux (right). (1936)

Personal information
- Full name: Paul Maye
- Born: 19 August 1913 Bayonne, France
- Died: 19 April 1987 (aged 73) Biarritz, France

Cycling career
- Sport: Cycling
- Discipline: Road
- Role: Rider

Major wins
- Paris–Tours (3x); French National Road Race Champion (2x); Paris–Roubaix

Paul Maye (19 August 1913 – 19 April 1987) was a French professional road bicycle racer. Maye shares the record of three Paris–Tours victories. He won the 1945 Paris–Roubaix.

== Major results ==
1934
France national amateur road race championships
1935
France national military road race championships
1936
Bordeaux-Saint-Jean d'Angély
Tour de France

Winner stages 10 and 19C

1935
France national road race championships
1941
Paris–Tours
Circuit de Paris
1942
Paris–Tours
Circuit de Paris
1943
France national road race championships
1945
Paris–Roubaix
Paris–Tours
