= Jacques Dupont (cyclist) =

French cyclist (1928–2019)

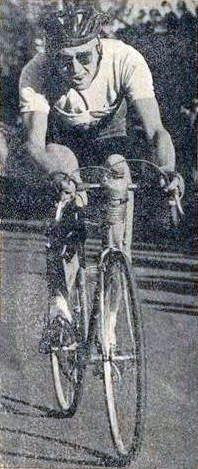
- Dupont in 1951

Personal information
- Born: 19 June 1928 Lézat-sur-Lèze, Ariège, France
- Died: 4 November 2019 (aged 91) Lézat-sur-Lèze

Cycling career
- Sport: Cycling
Medal record
Representing FRA
Men's cycling
Olympic Games
Gold medal – first place	1948 London	1000 m time trial
Bronze medal – third place	1948 London	Team road race

Jacques Dupont (French pronunciation: [ʒak dypɔ̃]; 19 June 1928 – 4 November 2019) was a French racing cyclist and Olympic champion in track cycling. He won a gold medal in the 1000m time trial at the 1948 Summer Olympics in London. He also won a bronze medal in the team road race, together with José Beyaert and Alain Moineau. He won Paris–Tours in 1951 and 1955. He won the 1955 event in what was then a record speed for a professional race covering the 253 km at an average of 43.666 km per hour and being awarded the Ruban Jaune.
