= Denis Verschueren =

Belgian cyclist

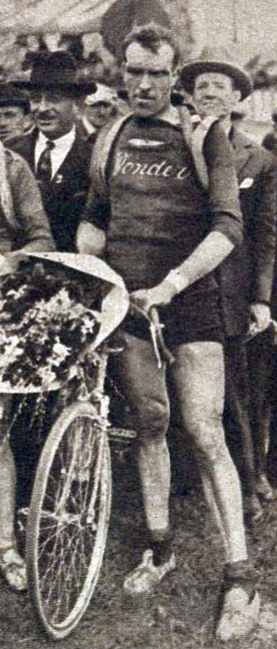

Personal information
- Full name: Denis Verschueren
- Born: 11 February 1897 Berlaar, Belgium
- Died: 18 April 1954 (aged 57) Lier, Belgium

Cycling career
- Sport: Cycling
- Discipline: Road
- Role: Rider

Professional teams
- 1923–1927: Wonder
- 1928: JB Louvet-Hutchinson
- 1929: Génial Lucifer-Hutchinson
- 1932: Wonder

Major wins
- Paris–Tours (1925, 1928); Tour of Belgium (1925); Tour of Flanders (1926); Paris–Brussels (1926); Scheldeprijs Vlaanderen (1930)

Denis Verschueren (11 February 1897 – 18 April 1954) was a Belgian racing cyclist.
