= 1962 Paris–Tours =

Race details
- Dates: 7 October 1962
- Stages: 1
- Distance: 267 km (165.9 mi)
- Winning time: 5h 57' 26"

Results
	Winner	Jo de Roo (NED)
	Second	Frans Melckenbeeck (BEL)
	Third	Benoni Beheyt (BEL)

The 1962 Paris–Tours was the 56th edition of the Paris–Tours cycle race and was held on 7 October 1962. The race started in Paris and finished in Tours. The race was won by Jo de Roo.

== General classification ==
Final general classification

Rank	Rider	Time
1	Jo de Roo (NED)	5h 57' 26"
2	Frans Melckenbeeck (BEL)	+ 2"
3	Benoni Beheyt (BEL)	+ 2"
4	Piet Damen (NED)	+ 2"
5	Gustaaf De Smet (BEL)	+ 2"
6	Willy Bocklant (BEL)	+ 2"
7	Fernand Delort (FRA)	+ 2"
8	Bernard Viot (FRA)	+ 2"
9	Etienne Vercauteren (BEL)	+ 2"
10	Piet Rentmeester (NED)	+ 2"
