= Jules Rossi =

Italian cyclist

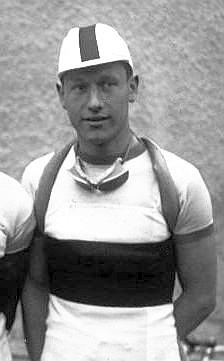
- Jules Rossi in 1934

Personal information
- Full name: Giulio Rossi
- Born: 3 November 1914 Acquanera di San Giustin, Italy
- Died: 30 June 1968 (aged 53) Champigny-sur-Marne, France

Cycling career
- Sport: Cycling
- Discipline: Road
- Role: Rider

Major wins
- Paris–Roubaix (1937); Paris–Tours (1938)

Jules Rossi (3 November 1914 – 30 June 1968) was an Italian professional road bicycle racer. Rossi became an orphan at the age of six and came to France to live in the town of Nogent-sur-Marne with the rest of his family. He started serious cycling at the age of 14 in 1928 and by 1933 had become one of the top amateurs in France riding for the Velo Club de Levallois. In 1934 Rossi turned professional for the Alcyon-Dunlop team of Ludovic Feuillet. He soon turned in some impressive performances as a professional winning the Circuit of the Allier in 1935 and Paris-St Etienne in 1936. In 1936 he finished fifth in Paris–Roubaix and in 1937 he became the first Italian to win that cobbled classic at the age of just 23. In 1938 he won Paris–Tours in a record average speed for a professional race of 42.092 km per hour, being awarded the Ruban Jaune for that achievement. Also in 1938 Rossi won Stage 6A of the Tour de France between Bordeaux and Arcachon. Rossi continued to race throughout the years of World War II winning Paris-Reims twice (1941 and 1943) and the Grand Prix des Nations in 1941.

== Major results ==
1936
Paris – Saint-Etienne
1937
Paris–Roubaix
1938
Paris–Tours
Tour de France:

Winner stage 6A

1941
Paris-Reims
Grand Prix des Nations
1943
Paris-Reims
1945
Nantua
