= List of teams and cyclists in the 1969 Tour de France =

List of cyclists

For the 1969 Tour de France, Eddy Merckx had been removed from the 1969 Giro d'Italia in leading position because of a positive doping result, and was initially not allowed to join, but his suspension was later lifted. The Tour started with the following 13 teams, each with 10 cyclists:

- Bic
- Mann–Grundig
- Peugeot–BP–Michelin
- Kas–Kaskol
- Flandria–De Clerck–Krüger
- Faema
- Sonolor–Lejeune–Wolber
- Mercier–BP–Hutchinson
- Frimatic–de Gribaldy–Viva–Wolber
- Willem II–Gazelle
- Fagor
- Molteni
- Salvarani

== Start list ==
=== By team ===
Bic
No.	Rider	Pos.
1	Jan Janssen (NED)	10
2	Lucien Aimar (FRA)	30
3	Gilbert Bellone (FRA)	45
4	Roland Berland (FRA)	53
5	Serge Bolley (FRA)	DNF
6	Charly Grosskost (FRA)	DNF
7	Anatole Novak (FRA)	DNF
8	José Pérez Francés (ESP)	DNF
9	José Samyn (FRA)	DNF
10	Michael Wright (GBR)	71

Mann–Grundig
No.	Rider	Pos.
11	Roger Cooreman (BEL)	84
12	Ronald De Witte (BEL)	DNF
13	Jos Huysmans (BEL)	DNF
14	Paul In 't Ven (BEL)	75
15	Willy In 't Ven (BEL)	DNF
16	Georges Pintens (BEL)	DNF
17	André Poppe (BEL)	33
18	Roger Rosiers (BEL)	DNF
19	Willy Van Neste (BEL)	DNF
20	Herman Van Springel (BEL)	18

Peugeot–BP–Michelin
No.	Rider	Pos.
21	André Bayssière (FRA)	31
22	Robert Bouloux (FRA)	55
23	Ferdinand Bracke (BEL)	57
24	Raymond Delisle (FRA)	37
25	Jean Dumont (FRA)	16
26	Gerben Karstens (NED)	65
27	Désiré Letort (FRA)	9
28	Willy Monty (BEL)	DNF
29	Roger Pingeon (FRA)	2
30	Christian Raymond (FRA)	42

Kas–Kaskol
No.	Rider	Pos.
31	Eduardo Castelló (ESP)	19
32	Francisco Galdós (ESP)	21
33	Andrés Gandarias (ESP)	5
34	Antonio Gómez del Moral (ESP)	DNF
35	José Gómez (ESP)	58
36	Aurelio González Puente (ESP)	DNF
37	Nemesio Jiménez (ESP)	61
38	Santiago Lazcano (ESP)	41
39	Gabriel Mascaró Febrer (ESP)	DNF
40	Gregorio San Miguel (ESP)	DNF

Flandria–De Clerck–Krüger
No.	Rider	Pos.
41	Michel Coulon (BEL)	74
42	Wilfried David (BEL)	27
43	Marc De Block (BEL)	82
44	Jaak De Boever (BEL)	60
45	Roger De Vlaeminck (BEL)	DNF
46	Eric Leman (BEL)	79
47	Pol Mahieu (BEL)	DNF
48	Jean Monteyne (BEL)	DNF
49	Pieter Nassen (BEL)	DNF
50	Noël Van Clooster (BEL)	DNF

Faema
No.	Rider	Pos.
51	Eddy Merckx (BEL)	1
52	Frans Mintjens (BEL)	76
53	Guido Reybrouck (BEL)	77
54	Pietro Scandelli (ITA)	59
55	Jozef Spruyt (BEL)	28
56	Julien Stevens (BEL)	72
57	Roger Swerts (BEL)	44
58	Georges Vandenberghe (BEL)	56
59	Martin Van Den Bossche (BEL)	23
60	Victor Van Schil (BEL)	29

Sonolor–Lejeune–Wolber
No.	Rider	Pos.
61	Stéphane Abrahamian (FRA)	34
62	José Catieau (FRA)	66
63	Édouard Delberghe (FRA)	70
64	Roger Gilson (LUX)	DNF
65	Bernard Guyot (FRA)	50
66	Yves Ravaleu (FRA)	DNF
67	Jean-Claude Theillière (FRA)	13
68	Lucien Van Impe (BEL)	12
69	André Wilhelm (FRA)	86
70	André Zimmermann (FRA)	26

Mercier–BP–Hutchinson
No.	Rider	Pos.
71	Eddy Beugels (NED)	83
72	Georges Chappe (FRA)	DNF
73	Jean-Pierre Genet (FRA)	68
74	Barry Hoban (GBR)	67
75	Edward Janssens (BEL)	40
76	Bernard Labourdette (FRA)	25
77	Paul Lemeteyer (FRA)	DNF
78	Raymond Poulidor (FRA)	3
79	Raymond Riotte (FRA)	80
80	Jean Vidament (FRA)	48

Frimatic–de Gribaldy–Viva–Wolber
No.	Rider	Pos.
81	Joaquim Agostinho (POR)	8
82	Jean-Louis Bodin (FRA)	62
83	Paul Gutty (FRA)	17
84	Derek Harrison (GBR)	32
85	Maurice Izier (FRA)	35
86	Jean Jourden (FRA)	DNF
87	Jean-Claude Lebaube (FRA)	46
88	Pierre Matignon (FRA)	85
89	Willy Planckaert (BEL)	DNF
90	Francis Rigon (FRA)	54

Willem II–Gazelle
No.	Rider	Pos.
91	Evert Dolman (NED)	49
92	Cees Haast (NED)	63
93	Henk Nijdam (NED)	DNF
94	Harm Ottenbros (NED)	78
95	René Pijnen (NED)	DNF
96	Leen Poortvliet (NED)	DNF
97	Jozef Timmermann (BEL)	DNF
98	Juul Van Der Flaas (BEL)	64
99	Rik Van Looy (BEL)	DNF
100	Marinus Wagtmans (NED)	6

Fagor
No.	Rider	Pos.
101	Mariano Díaz (ESP)	DNF
102	Francisco Gabica (ESP)	24
103	Joaquim Galera (ESP)	11
104	Manuel Galera (ESP)	47
105	José Manuel López (ESP)	22
106	Ramón Mendiburu (ESP)	DNF
107	José Antonio Momeñe (ESP)	DNF
108	Luis Ocaña (ESP)	DNF
109	Domingo Perurena (ESP)	38
110	Luis Pedro Santamarina (ESP)	DNF

Molteni
No.	Rider	Pos.
111	Mario Anni (ITA)	69
112	Marino Basso (ITA)	DNF
113	Giannino Bianco (ITA)	DNF
114	Michele Dancelli (ITA)	20
115	Sigfrido Fontanelli (ITA)	DNF
116	Giancarlo Polidori (ITA)	DNF
117	Giacinto Santambrogio (ITA)	73
118	Edy Schütz (LUX)	15
119	Guerrino Tosello (ITA)	DNF
120	Pierfranco Vianelli (ITA)	7

Salvarani
No.	Rider	Pos.
121	Rudi Altig (FRG)	DNF
122	Franco Balmamion (ITA)	39
123	Lino Carletto (ITA)	DNF
124	Giancarlo Ferretti (ITA)	43
125	Felice Gimondi (ITA)	4
126	Pietro Guerra (ITA)	81
127	Wladimiro Panizza (ITA)	14
128	Wilfried Peffgen (FRG)	52
129	Roberto Poggiali (ITA)	51
130	Dino Zandegù (ITA)	36

=== By rider ===
Legend
No.	Starting number worn by the rider during the Tour
Pos.	Position in the general classification
DNF	Denotes a rider who did not finish

No.	Name	Nationality	Team	Pos.	Ref
1	Jan Janssen	Netherlands	Bic	10	
2	Lucien Aimar	France	Bic	30	
3	Gilbert Bellone	France	Bic	45	
4	Roland Berland	France	Bic	53	
5	Serge Bolley	France	Bic	DNF	
6	Charly Grosskost	France	Bic	DNF	
7	Anatole Novak	France	Bic	DNF	
8	José Pérez Francés	Spain	Bic	DNF	
9	José Samyn	France	Bic	DNF	
10	Michael Wright	Great Britain	Bic	71	
11	Roger Cooreman	Belgium	Mann–Grundig	84	
12	Ronald De Witte	Belgium	Mann–Grundig	DNF	
13	Jos Huysmans	Belgium	Mann–Grundig	DNF	
14	Paul In 't Ven	Belgium	Mann–Grundig	75	
15	Willy In 't Ven	Belgium	Mann–Grundig	DNF	
16	Georges Pintens	Belgium	Mann–Grundig	DNF	
17	André Poppe	Belgium	Mann–Grundig	33	
18	Roger Rosiers	Belgium	Mann–Grundig	DNF	
19	Willy Van Neste	Belgium	Mann–Grundig	DNF	
20	Herman Van Springel	Belgium	Mann–Grundig	18	
21	André Bayssière	France	Peugeot–BP–Michelin	31	
22	Robert Bouloux	France	Peugeot–BP–Michelin	55	
23	Ferdinand Bracke	Belgium	Peugeot–BP–Michelin	57	
24	Raymond Delisle	France	Peugeot–BP–Michelin	37	
25	Jean Dumont	France	Peugeot–BP–Michelin	16	
26	Gerben Karstens	Netherlands	Peugeot–BP–Michelin	65	
27	Désiré Letort	France	Peugeot–BP–Michelin	9	
28	Willy Monty	Belgium	Peugeot–BP–Michelin	DNF	
29	Roger Pingeon	France	Peugeot–BP–Michelin	2	
30	Christian Raymond	France	Peugeot–BP–Michelin	42	
31	Eduardo Castelló	Spain	Kas–Kaskol	19	
32	Francisco Galdós	Spain	Kas–Kaskol	21	
33	Andrés Gandarias	Spain	Kas–Kaskol	5	
34	Antonio Gómez del Moral	Spain	Kas–Kaskol	DNF	
35	José Gómez	Spain	Kas–Kaskol	58	
36	Aurelio González Puente	Spain	Kas–Kaskol	DNF	
37	Nemesio Jiménez	Spain	Kas–Kaskol	61	
38	Santiago Lazcano	Spain	Kas–Kaskol	41	
39	Gabriel Mascaró Febrer	Spain	Kas–Kaskol	DNF	
40	Gregorio San Miguel	Spain	Kas–Kaskol	DNF	
41	Michel Coulon	Belgium	Flandria–De Clerck–Krüger	74	
42	Wilfried David	Belgium	Flandria–De Clerck–Krüger	27	
43	Marc De Block	Belgium	Flandria–De Clerck–Krüger	82	
44	Jaak De Boever	Belgium	Flandria–De Clerck–Krüger	60	
45	Roger De Vlaeminck	Belgium	Flandria–De Clerck–Krüger	DNF	
46	Eric Leman	Belgium	Flandria–De Clerck–Krüger	79	
47	Pol Mahieu	Belgium	Flandria–De Clerck–Krüger	DNF	
48	Jean Monteyne	Belgium	Flandria–De Clerck–Krüger	DNF	
49	Pieter Nassen	Belgium	Flandria–De Clerck–Krüger	DNF	
50	Noël Van Clooster	Belgium	Flandria–De Clerck–Krüger	DNF	
51	Eddy Merckx	Belgium	Faema	1	
52	Frans Mintjens	Belgium	Faema	76	
53	Guido Reybrouck	Belgium	Faema	77	
54	Pietro Scandelli	Italy	Faema	59	
55	Jozef Spruyt	Belgium	Faema	28	
56	Julien Stevens	Belgium	Faema	72	
57	Roger Swerts	Belgium	Faema	44	
58	Georges Vandenberghe	Belgium	Faema	56	
59	Martin Van Den Bossche	Belgium	Faema	23	
60	Victor Van Schil	Belgium	Faema	29	
61	Stéphane Abrahamian	France	Sonolor–Lejeune–Wolber	34	
62	José Catieau	France	Sonolor–Lejeune–Wolber	66	
63	Édouard Delberghe	France	Sonolor–Lejeune–Wolber	70	
64	Roger Gilson	Luxembourg	Sonolor–Lejeune–Wolber	DNF	
65	Bernard Guyot	France	Sonolor–Lejeune–Wolber	50	
66	Yves Ravaleu	France	Sonolor–Lejeune–Wolber	DNF	
67	Jean-Claude Theillière	France	Sonolor–Lejeune–Wolber	13	
68	Lucien Van Impe	Belgium	Sonolor–Lejeune–Wolber	12	
69	André Wilhelm	France	Sonolor–Lejeune–Wolber	86	
70	André Zimmermann	France	Sonolor–Lejeune–Wolber	26	
71	Eddy Beugels	Netherlands	Mercier–BP–Hutchinson	83	
72	Georges Chappe	France	Mercier–BP–Hutchinson	DNF	
73	Jean-Pierre Genet	France	Mercier–BP–Hutchinson	68	
74	Barry Hoban	Great Britain	Mercier–BP–Hutchinson	67	
75	Edward Janssens	Belgium	Mercier–BP–Hutchinson	40	
76	Bernard Labourdette	France	Mercier–BP–Hutchinson	25	
77	Paul Lemeteyer	France	Mercier–BP–Hutchinson	DNF	
78	Raymond Poulidor	France	Mercier–BP–Hutchinson	3	
79	Raymond Riotte	France	Mercier–BP–Hutchinson	80	
80	Jean Vidament	France	Mercier–BP–Hutchinson	48	
81	Joaquim Agostinho	Portugal	Frimatic–de Gribaldy–Viva–Wolber	8	
82	Jean-Louis Bodin	France	Frimatic–de Gribaldy–Viva–Wolber	62	
83	Paul Gutty	France	Frimatic–de Gribaldy–Viva–Wolber	17	
84	Derek Harrison	Great Britain	Frimatic–de Gribaldy–Viva–Wolber	32	
85	Maurice Izier	France	Frimatic–de Gribaldy–Viva–Wolber	35	
86	Jean Jourden	France	Frimatic–de Gribaldy–Viva–Wolber	DNF	
87	Jean-Claude Lebaube	France	Frimatic–de Gribaldy–Viva–Wolber	46	
88	Pierre Matignon	France	Frimatic–de Gribaldy–Viva–Wolber	85	
89	Willy Planckaert	Belgium	Frimatic–de Gribaldy–Viva–Wolber	DNF	
90	Francis Rigon	France	Frimatic–de Gribaldy–Viva–Wolber	54	
91	Evert Dolman	Netherlands	Willem II–Gazelle	49	
92	Cees Haast	Netherlands	Willem II–Gazelle	63	
93	Henk Nijdam	Netherlands	Willem II–Gazelle	DNF	
94	Harm Ottenbros	Netherlands	Willem II–Gazelle	78	
95	René Pijnen	Netherlands	Willem II–Gazelle	DNF	
96	Leen Poortvliet	Netherlands	Willem II–Gazelle	DNF	
97	Jozef Timmermann	Belgium	Willem II–Gazelle	DNF	
98	Jules Van Der Flaas	Belgium	Willem II–Gazelle	64	
99	Rik Van Looy	Belgium	Willem II–Gazelle	DNF	
100	Marinus Wagtmans	Netherlands	Willem II–Gazelle	6	
101	Mariano Díaz	Spain	Fagor	DNF	
102	Francisco Gabica	Spain	Fagor	24	
103	Joaquim Galera	Spain	Fagor	11	
104	Manuel Galera	Spain	Fagor	47	
105	José Manuel López	Spain	Fagor	22	
106	Ramón Mendiburu	Spain	Fagor	DNF	
107	José Antonio Momeñe	Spain	Fagor	DNF	
108	Luis Ocaña	Spain	Fagor	DNF	
109	Domingo Perurena	Spain	Fagor	38	
110	Luis Pedro Santamarina	Spain	Fagor	DNF	
111	Mario Anni	Italy	Molteni	69	
112	Marino Basso	Italy	Molteni	DNF	
113	Giannino Bianco	Italy	Molteni	DNF	
114	Michele Dancelli	Italy	Molteni	20	
115	Sigfrido Fontanelli	Italy	Molteni	DNF	
116	Giancarlo Polidori	Italy	Molteni	DNF	
117	Giacinto Santambrogio	Italy	Molteni	73	
118	Edy Schütz	Luxembourg	Molteni	15	
119	Guerrino Tosello	Italy	Molteni	DNF	
120	Pierfranco Vianelli	Italy	Molteni	7	
121	Rudi Altig	West Germany	Salvarani	DNF	
122	Franco Balmamion	Italy	Salvarani	39	
123	Lino Carletto	Italy	Salvarani	DNF	
124	Giancarlo Ferretti	Italy	Salvarani	43	
125	Felice Gimondi	Italy	Salvarani	4	
126	Pietro Guerra	Italy	Salvarani	81	
127	Wladimiro Panizza	Italy	Salvarani	14	
128	Wilfried Peffgen	West Germany	Salvarani	52	
129	Roberto Poggiali	Italy	Salvarani	51	
130	Dino Zandegù	Italy	Salvarani	36	
