= Omloop Het Nieuwsblad U23 =

Belgian one-day road cycling race

- Poster to the 2023 event in Herzele

Race details
- Date: July
- Region: Flanders
- Discipline: Road
- Competition: Amateur race (1950–1998, 2003–2009); UCI 1.7.1 (1999–2001); UCI 1.7.2 (2002); UCI Europe Tour (2010–2018); Interclub U23 Road Series (2019–present)
- Type: One-day race
- Web site: www.omloophetnieuwsblad.be/nl/under-23

History
- First edition: 1950
- Editions: 71 (as of 2023)
- First winner: Georges Vermeersch (BEL)
- Most wins: Dimitri Claeys (BEL) (2 wins)
- Most recent: Liam Van Bylen (BEL)

The Omloop Het Nieuwsblad U23 is a cycling race held annually in Flanders, Belgium. It was previously part of the UCI Europe Tour in category 1.2.

== Winners ==
Year	Winner	Second	Third
1950	Georges Vermeersch (BEL)	Edgard Sorgeloos (BEL)	André Demeulenaere (BEL)
1951	Gilbert Vercammen (BEL)	Paul Taeldeman (BEL)	Albert Vandevoorde (BEL)
1952	Gilbert Van de Wiele (BEL)	Joseph De Bakker (BEL)	Camilius Demunster (BEL)
1953	Rik Van Looy (BEL)	Camilius Demunster (BEL)	René Van Meenen (BEL)
1954	Piet De Jongh (NED)	Roger Callewaert (BEL)	Maurice Minne (BEL)
1955	Gabriel Borra (BEL)	Julien Schepens (BEL)	Werner Van Haecke (BEL)
1956	Gustaaf De Smet (BEL)	Antoon Diependaele (BEL)	Jos Sterckx (BEL)
1957	August Auwers (BEL)	Theo Verhoeven (BEL)	Marcel Sleeuwaert (BEL)
1958	Lucien Stevens (BEL)	Edmond Coppens (BEL)	Leopold Coppens (BEL)
1959	Willy De Clercq (BEL)	Lode Troonbeeckx (BEL)	Raoul Lampaert (BEL)
1960	No race		
1961	Emiel Verbiest (BEL)	Roland Aper (BEL)	Benoni Beheyt (BEL)
1962	Léon Lenaerts (BEL)	Werner Verbeke (BEL)	Claude Vermaut (BEL)
1963	Jozef Timmerman (BEL)	Wilfried Bonte (BEL)	Guido Reybrouck (BEL)
1964	Hubert Criel (BEL)	Willy Planckaert (BEL)	Jos Meesters (BEL)
1965	Robert Legein (BEL)	Vital Dheedene (BEL)	Jules Van Der Flaas (BEL)
1966	Marcel Maes (BEL)	Eddy Beugels (NED)	Fernand De Keyser (BEL)
1967	Pol Mahieu (BEL)	Freddy Decloedt (BEL)	Robert Van Oostende (BEL)
1968	Jozef Schoeters (BEL)	Roger Volckaert (BEL)	Willy Moonen (BEL)
1969	Emile Cambré (BEL)	Jos Abelshausen (BEL)	Frans Kerremans (BEL)
1970	Frans Verhaegen (BEL)	Willy Van Mechelen (BEL)	Marcel Sannen (BEL)
1971	No race		
1972	Freddy Maertens (BEL)	Daniel Moenaert (BEL)	Cees Swinkels (NED)
1973	Gerrie Knetemann (NED)	Ludo Noels (BEL)	Ad Dekkers (NED)
1974	Hans Koot (NED)	Benny Schepmans (BEL)	Jean-Luc Vandenbroucke (BEL)
1975	Jean-Luc Vandenbroucke (BEL)	Peer Maas (NED)	Hugo Van Gastel (BEL)
1976	Jacques Vooys (NED)	Roger Young (USA)	Leo van Vliet (NED)
1977	Gérard Mak (NED)	Leo Van Thielen (BEL)	Frits Pirard (NED)
1978	François Caethoven (BEL)	Henk Mutsaars (NED)	Anton van der Steen (NED)
1979	Peter Zijerveld (NED)	Marc Crassaerts (BEL)	Ruud van der Rakt (NED)
1980	Johnny Broers (NED)	Detlef Kurzweg (RFA)	Adri van der Poel (NED)
1981	Wim Van Eynde (BEL)	Luc De Decker (BEL)	Erik Lamers (BEL)
1982	Alain Lippens (BEL)	Roger Van Den Bossche (BEL)	Philippe Christiaens (BEL)
1983	Franky Van Oyen (BEL)	Rudy Patry (BEL)	Gino Knockaert (BEL)
1984	Carlo Bomans (BEL)	Frank Verleyen (BEL)	Ronny Van Sweevelt (BEL)
1985	Marc Sprangers (BEL)	Ronny Van Sweevelt (BEL)	Frank Neyrinck (BEL)
1986	Peter Roes (BEL)	Andre Vermeiren (BEL)	Edwig Van Hooydonck (BEL)
1987	Benny Heylen (BEL)	Peter De Clercq (BEL)	Patrick Robeet (BEL)
1988	Johnny Dauwe (BEL)	Peter Punt (BEL)	Jan Vervecken (BEL)
1989	Pascal De Roeck (BEL)	Luc Heuvelmans (BEL)	Patrick van Passel (NED)
1990	Patrick Van Roosbroeck (BEL)	Peter Farazijn (BEL)	Stéphane Hennebert (BEL)
1991	Stéphane Hennebert (BEL)	Gino Primo (BEL)	Patrick Vandermaesen (BEL)
1992	Rufin De Smet (BEL)	Sébastien Van Den Abeele (BEL)	Gino Primo (BEL)
1993	Mario Liboton (BEL)	Carl Roes (BEL)	Patrick Laenen (BEL)
1994	Patrick Ruyloft (BEL)	Gerdy Goossens (BEL)	Kris Gerits (BEL)
1995	Danny In 't Ven (BEL)	Andy De Smet (BEL)	Guillaume Belzile (CAN)
1996	Steven Van Malderghem (BEL)	Tim Lenaers (BEL)	Jarno Vanfrachem (BEL)
1997	Leif Hoste (BEL)	Gunther Stockx (BEL)	Jurgen Vermeersch (BEL)
1998	Wesley Huvaere (BEL)	Frédéric Finot (FRA)	Franck Pencolé (FRA)
1999	Kevin Hulsmans (BEL)	Tom Serlet (BEL)	James Vanlandschoot (BEL)
2000	Gorik Gardeyn (BEL)	Davy Commeyne (BEL)	Wesley Van Speybroeck (BEL)
2001	Gert Steegmans (BEL)	Tom Boonen (BEL)	Jan Kuyckx (BEL)
2002	Johan Vansummeren (BEL)	Kevin Van der Slagmolen (BEL)	Glen Zelderloo (BEL)
2003	Preben Van Hecke (BEL)	Glen Zelderloo (BEL)	Hilton Clarke (AUS)
2004	Stijn Vandenbergh (BEL)	Sven Renders (BEL)	Jean-Paul Simon (BEL)
2005	Nick Ingels (BEL)	Pieter Jacobs (BEL)	Bart Vanheule (BEL)
2006	Dominique Cornu (BEL)	Geert Steurs (BEL)	Steven De Decker (BEL)
2007	Gert Dockx (BEL)	Stijn Hoornaert (BEL)	Steven De Decker (BEL)
2008	Joeri Clauwaert (BEL)	Tim Vermeersch (BEL)	Sep Vanmarcke (BEL)
2009	Laurens De Vreese (BEL)	Sep Vanmarcke (BEL)	Jan Ghyselinck (BEL)
2010	Jarl Salomein (BEL)	Laurens De Vreese (BEL)	Klaas Sys (BEL)
2011	Tom Van Asbroeck (BEL)	Huub Duyn (NED)	Olivier Pardini (BEL)
2012	Sander Helven (BEL)	Gregory Franckaert (BEL)	Dimitri Claeys (BEL)
2013	Dimitri Claeys (BEL)	Stig Broeckx (BEL)	Clément Lhotellerie (FRA)
2014	Dimitri Claeys (BEL)	Dylan Teuns (BEL)	Jef Van Meirhaeghe (BEL)
2015	Floris Gerts (NED)	Dimitri Claeys (BEL)	Gianni Vermeersch (BEL)
2016	Elias Van Breussegem (BEL)	Gianni Vermeersch (BEL)	Dennis Coenen (BEL)
2017	Tanguy Turgis (FRA)	Aaron Verwilst (BEL)	Robbe Ghys (BEL)
2018	Erik Resell (NOR)	Brent Van Moer (BEL)	Jordi van Dingenen (BEL)
2019	Ward Vanhoof (BEL)	Arne Marit (BEL)	Dennis van der Horst (NED)
2020	Not held due to the COVID-19 pandemic in Belgium		
2021	Arnaud De Lie (BEL)	Milan Fretin (BEL)	Nathan Vandepitte (FRA)
2022	Luca Van Boven (BEL)	Siebe Deweirdt (BEL)	Warre Vangheluwe (BEL)
2023	Gianluca Pollefliet (BEL)	Dylan Vandenstorme (BEL)	Warre Vangheluwe (BEL)
2024	Robin Orins (BEL)	Matys Grisel (FRA)	Liam Van Bylen (BEL)
2025	Liam Van Bylen (BEL)	Tobias Müller (GER)	Marvin Peters (NED)
