= 1968 Brabantse Pijl =

Race details
- Dates: 14 April 1968
- Stages: 1
- Distance: 186 km (115.6 mi)
- Winning time: 4h 28' 00"

Results
	Winner	Victor Van Schil (BEL)
	Second	Willy Van Neste (BEL)
	Third	Eddy Beugels (NED)

The 1968 Brabantse Pijl was the eighth edition of the Brabantse Pijl cycle race and was held on 14 April 1968. The race started and finished in Sint-Genesius-Rode. The race was won by Victor Van Schil.

== General classification ==
Final general classification

Rank	Rider	Time
1	Victor Van Schil (BEL)	4h 28' 00"
2	Willy Van Neste (BEL)	+ 0"
3	Eddy Beugels (NED)	+ 0"
4	Roger Swerts (BEL)	+ 0"
5	Roger Cooreman (BEL)	+ 0"
6	Lino Carletto (ITA)	+ 0"
7	Herman Flabat (BEL)	+ 0"
8	Eddy Merckx (BEL)	+ 40"
9	Herman Van Springel (BEL)	+ 40"
10	Jos Spruyt (BEL)	+ 40"
