= Jan Janssen =

Dutch cyclist (born 1940)

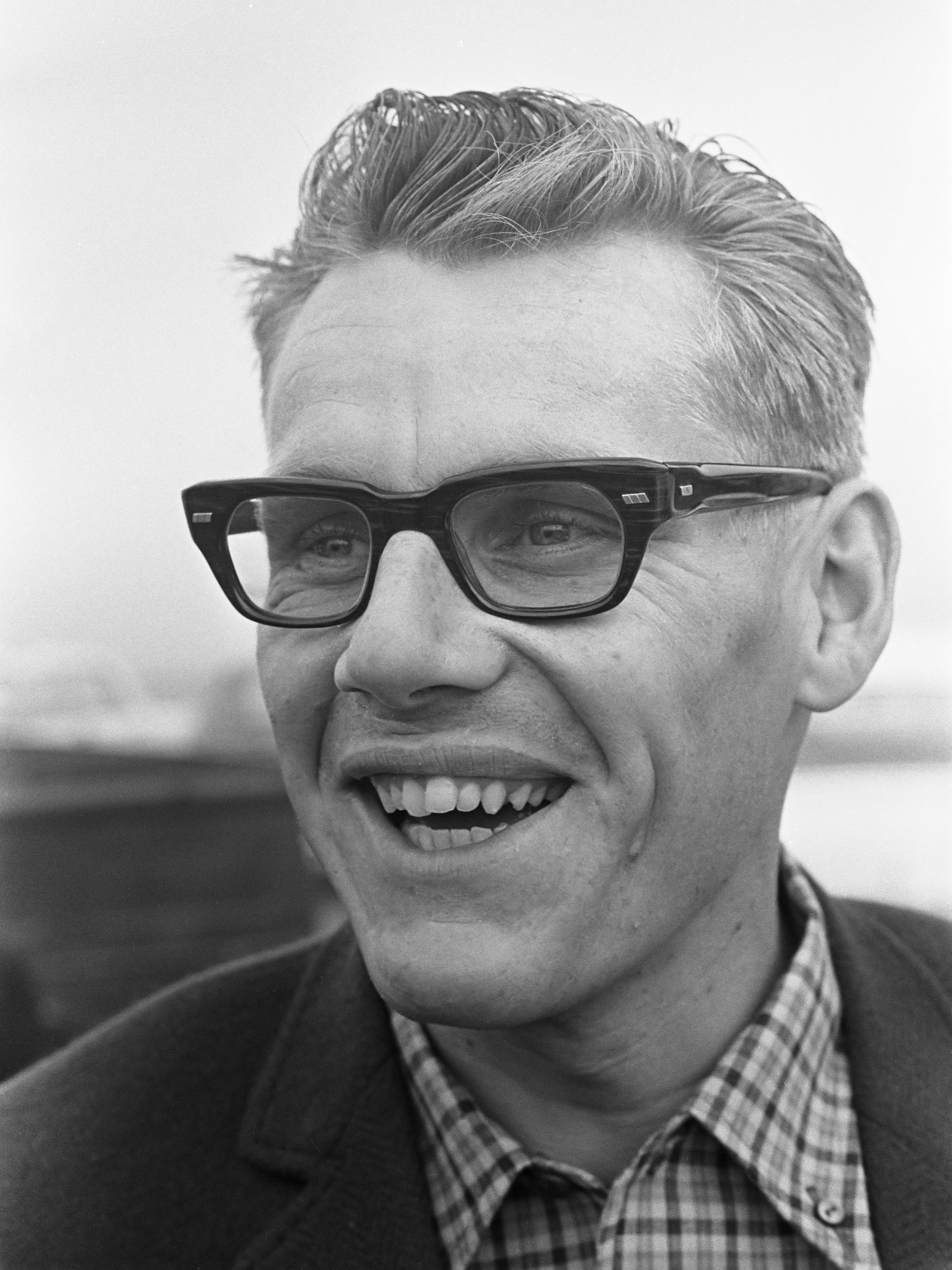
- Janssen at the 1967 Tour de France

Personal information
- Full name: Johannes Adrianus Janssen
- Born: 19 May 1940 (age 86) Nootdorp, South Holland, Netherlands
- Height: 1.74 m (5 ft 8 1/2 in)
- Weight: 76 kg (168 lb; 12 st 0 lb)

Cycling career
- Sport: Cycling
- Current team: Retired
- Discipline: Road
- Role: Rider
- Rider type: All-rounder

Professional teams
- 1962: Locomotief–Vredestein
- 1962–1968: Pelforth–Sauvage–Lejeune
- 1969–1971: Bic
- 1972: Beaulieu–Flandria

Major wins
- Grand Tours Tour de France General classification (1968) Points classification (1964, 1965, 1967) 7 individual stages (1963, 1964, 1965, 1967, 1968) 1 TTT Stage (1963) Vuelta a España General classification (1967) Points classification (1967, 1968) 3 individual stages (1967, 1968) Stage Races Paris–Nice (1964) One-day races and Classics World Road Race Championships (1964) Paris–Roubaix (1967)
Medal record
Representing the Netherlands
Men's road bicycle racing
World Championships
Gold medal – first place	1964 Sallanches	Elite Men's Road Race
Silver medal – second place	1967 Heerlen	Elite Men's Road Race

Johannes Adrianus "Jan" Janssen (Note: The phrase Johannes Adrianus Janssen is pronounced [joːˈɦɑnəs aːdriˈjaːnʏ ˈɕɑnsə(n)]. In isolation, the words are pronounced [joːˈɦɑnəs], [aˑdriˈjaːnʏs] and [ˈjɑnsə(n)]. Jan Janssen is pronounced [jɑ ˈɲɑnsə(n)]; in isolation, Jan is pronounced [jɑn].) (born 19 May 1940) is a Dutch former professional cyclist. He was world champion and winner of the Tour de France and the Vuelta a España, the first Dutch rider to win either. He rode the Tour de France eight times and finished all but the first time. He won seven stages and wore the yellow jersey for two days (after stage 16 in 1966 and after stage 22B in 1968). He was easily spotted in the peloton because of his blond hair and his glasses. As of the death of Federico Bahamontes in August 2023, he is the oldest surviving winner of the Tour de France, but not the most ancient winner: Lucien Aimar won in 1966.

== Early life ==
Janssen was born at Nootdorp, a small town near The Hague and Delft, just five days after the Netherlands surrendered to the Nazis. He later moved to Putte, a village on the Belgian border between Roosendaal and Antwerp. He worked with his parents as a youth, digging the heavy ground of the western Netherlands to excavate foundations for the buildings the family firm erected. He joined the cycling club at Delft when he was 16 and as a novice won 25 races in two years.

== Career ==
Janssen turned professional after an amateur career in which he won several Dutch classics and rode for the Netherlands in the Tour de l'Avenir, which was then open to amateurs and to independents, or semi-professionals. Janssen rode for French teams and is especially associated with Pelforth-BP, sponsored by a brewer and an oil company. His talent, authority, and command of French quickly established him as the team leader. At first he had a reputation as a sprinter but he quickly developed into a rider of multi-day races.

He competed in the individual road race at the 1960 Summer Olympics.

He rode his first Tour de France in 1963, when he won a stage, but a crash forced him to retire. In 1964 he won Paris–Nice, then two stages and the green jersey of points leader in the Tour. Later that year he became world champion at Sallanches, in France. He wore the green jersey again in the Tour of 1965 and in 1966 came close to winning overall. But it was finally in 1968 that he became the first Dutchman to win the Tour de France, beating the Belgian, Herman Van Springel, by 38 seconds. That remained the smallest winning margin until 1989, when Greg LeMond won by only eight seconds ahead of Laurent Fignon. Janssen had not worn the yellow jersey as leader of the general classification in 1968 until he reached Paris at the end of the final stage, an individual time-trial.

The Tour in 1968 was, like the previous year, for national teams rather than trade teams. The organisers resolved to "experiment" with national teams in a measure widely interpreted as revenge by the organiser, Félix Lévitan, on sponsors he thought had provoked a strike against drug tests the previous year. Putting into one team riders who the rest of the year rode for rival sponsors proved a problem and internal rivalries were said to divide the Dutch team more than most. Janssen had to overcome these internal problems to win. His victory in the orange jersey of the Netherlands rather than the blue, yellow and white of the Pelforth team made his first win for the Netherlands all the more popular at home.

== Retirement ==
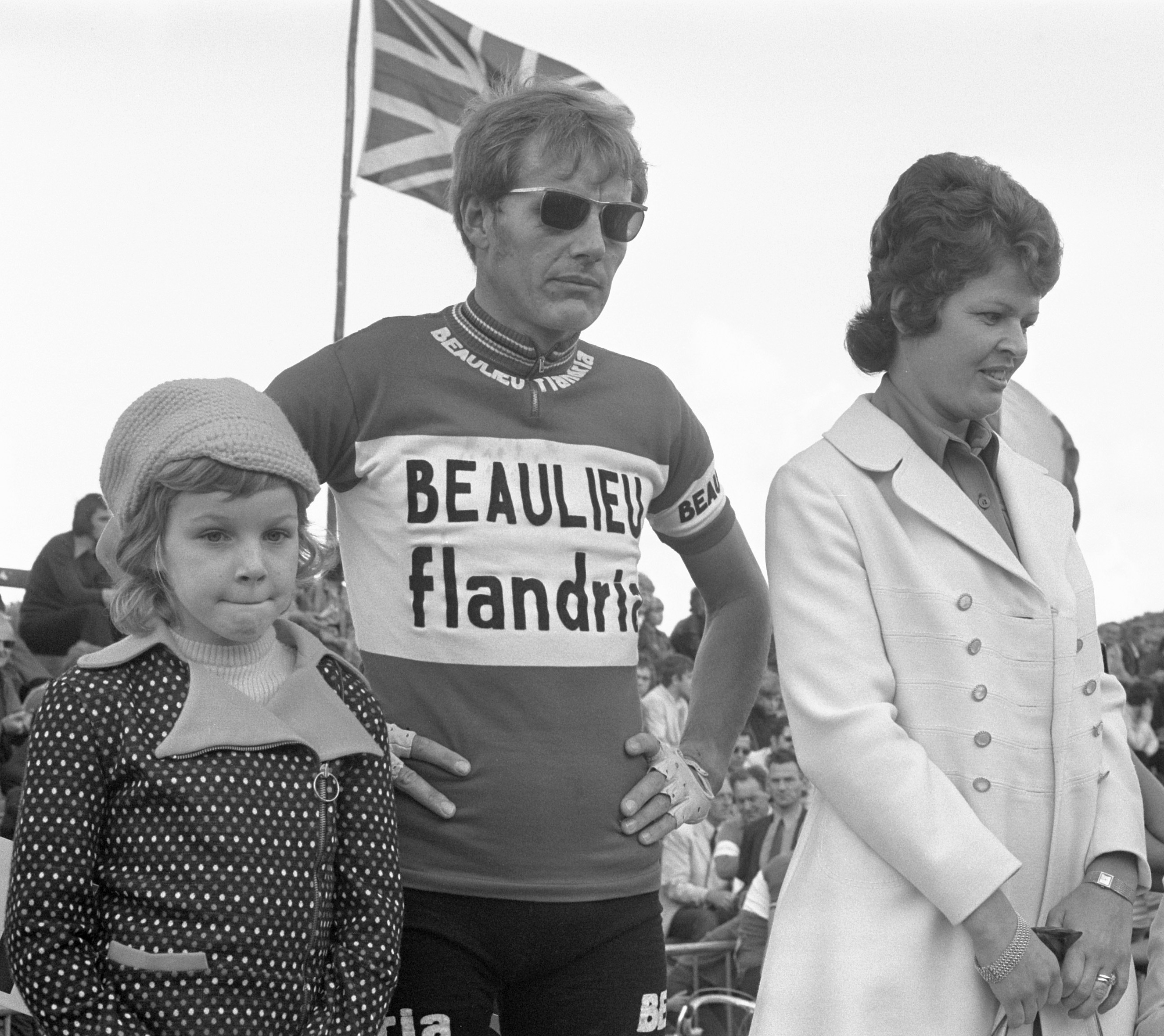
Janssen with his wife and daughter Karin during his retirement ceremony on 23 September 1972

He retired from racing, he says, after being left behind in the Tour of Luxembourg and being ashamed to hear his name listed on the race radio service among other also-rans.

"I knew then that I was Jan Janssen, winner of the Tour de France and the championship of the world and that it was time for me to stop", he says.

He left the peloton to run a bicycle frame-building business in the south-western village of Putte, which is divided by the border with Belgium. That company still bears his name today. His neighbours there included another world champion, Hennie Kuiper. Janssen continued to ride his bike in retirement as a member of the Zuid-West Hoek club. He continues to make personal appearances along with other Dutch riders of his era. He said he enjoyed being recognised while on training rides.

== Personality ==
The Dutch race organiser Charles Ruys, who called Janssen a businesslike, honest and straightforward man, said:

Anybody who tries to do something unpleasant to Jan, may it be in a race or a matter of money, has a very tough opponent. Like most successful bikies, Jan knows the value of money. So much so that he gives the impression that he is our Minister of Finance.

A bit of insight into his personality, showing the respect and compassion he showed for his fellow riders, can be gathered from a 2007 interview regarding the feisty British rider Tom Simpson (see the Death of Tom Simpson):

"Occasionally Tommy could be annoying. When it was rolling along at 30kmh and - paf!… he’d attack. Oh leave us alone! There's still 150km to go pipe down. But often, he wanted war.” Janssen went on to say, “Even in the feed zones. It's not the law, but it's not polite. Musettes (lunch bags) were up in the air there was panic and crashes. It was Simpson acting like a jerk. It didn't happen often. Occasionally I was angry at him. I’d say to him in his native English: You fucking cunt... There were often many teams, five or six, in the same hotel together every evening. Each had their own table. And at a certain moment, Tommy walked into the restaurant like a gentleman, with a cane, bowler hat and in costume… He was like a Lord in England and the rest of us were in tracksuits. Everyone saw that, laughed, and the things he had done during the race were forgotten.”

== Views of modern racing ==
Janssen spent most of his career with a French sponsor, profiting from the higher rate that the French franc enjoyed then against the guilder. But since then things have changed, he said.

We had to be good all the time, from the first of February until the end of October. Because it was my duty to make the most of my sponsor's name, to get publicity. And if you had an off-day, well, you were letting your sponsors down. Now the whole sponsorship of sport has taken off. It has become so interesting to a company, because a company that wants to get its name known, you can buy a good team, with good management, good public relations, and you can get all the big names. I think, too, that the motivation has changed with the professionals as well. You get riders like Steven Rooks and Gert-Jan Theunisse saying that after the Tour they are stopping at home because they can't be bothered with criteriums, and that's not attractive for the public.

== Career achievements ==
=== Major results ===
1959
2nd Ronde van Overijssel
1960
1st Ronde van Midden-Nederland
1st Ronde van Overijssel
1961
1st Ronde van Noord-Holland
3rd Ronde van Midden-Nederland
9th Overall Tour de l'Avenir

1st Stage 13

1962
1st Züri-Metzgete
3rd Overall Olympia's Tour

1st Stage 4

3rd Overall Tour de l'Avenir

1st Stage 1, 4 & 7

5th Tour des Quatre-Cantons
6th Overall Deutschland Tour
8th Road race, National Road Championships
8th Rund um den Henninger Turm
1963
Tour de France

1st Stages 2b (TTT) & 7

2nd Overall Grand Prix du Midi Libre

1st Stage 3 & 5

2nd La Flèche Wallonne
2nd Omloop van Oost-Vlaanderen
3rd Paris–Roubaix
4th Kuurne–Brussels–Kuurne
4th Grand Prix du Parisien (TTT)
6th Tour des Onze Villes
7th Road race, UCI World Championships
7th Brabantse Pijl
8th Overall Tour of Belgium

1st Stage 3a

9th Overall Tour du Var
9th Liège–Bastogne–Liège
1964
1st Road race, UCI World Championships
1st Overall Paris–Nice

1st Points classification

Tour de France

1st Points classification
1st Stage 7 & 10a

2nd La Flèche Wallonne
3rd Paris–Camembert
6th Overall Paris–Luxembourg
6th Gent–Wevelgem
6th Paris–Brussels
7th Giro di Lombardia
8th Paris–Roubaix
8th Paris–Tours
1965
1st Overall Ronde van Nederland

1st Stage 3

1st Grand Prix du Parisien (TTT)
Critérium du Dauphiné Libéré

1st Points classification
1st Stage 7a

2nd Overall Circuit du Provençal

1st Points classification
1st Stage 3a

2nd Critérium des As
5th Overall Paris–Nice

1st Stage 3a

5th Omloop Het Volk
6th Milan–San Remo
7th Paris–Tours
9th Overall Tour de France

1st Points classification
1st Stage 12

9th Overall Grand Prix du Midi Libre

1st Stage 1

10th Kuurne–Brussels–Kuurne
1966
1st Brabantse Pijl
1st Bordeaux–Paris
2nd Overall Tour de France

Held after Stage 16

2nd Overall Four Days of Dunkirk
2nd Paris–Roubaix
4th La Flèche Wallonne
4th Paris–Tours
5th Critérium des As
6th Dwars door België
7th Gent–Wevelgem
9th Giro di Lombardia
1967
1st Overall Vuelta a España

1st Points classification
1st Stage 1b (ITT)

1st Overall Paris–Luxembourg

1st Stage 1

1st Paris–Roubaix
1st Genoa–Nice
Volta a Catalunya

1st Stages 4b, 6 & 7a

2nd Road race, UCI World Championships
2nd Gent–Wevelgem
3rd Overall Tour of Belgium
3rd Trofeo Laigueglia
3rd Tour de l'Hérault
5th Overall Tour de France

1st Points classification
1st Stage 13

5th Overall Escalada a Montjuïc
6th À travers Lausanne
8th GP Union Dortmund
9th Road race, National Road Championships
9th Tour of Flanders
9th Giro di Lombardia
10th Harelbeke–Antwerp–Harelbeke
1968
1st Overall Tour de France

1st Stage 14 & 22b (ITT)

1st Stage 5 Vuelta a Mallorca
2nd Maël-Pestivien
3rd Tour of Flanders
3rd La Flèche Wallonne
4th Giro di Lombardia
5th Overall Paris–Nice

1st Stage 5

6th Overall Vuelta a España

1st Points classification
1st Stage 1a & 1b (ITT)
Held after Stages 1a–3a

7th Overall Escalada a Montjuïc
8th Paris–Roubaix
9th Harelbeke–Antwerp–Harelbeke
1969
1st Overall Vuelta a Mallorca

1st Stage 2a

1st Grand Prix d'Isbergues
Critérium du Dauphiné Libéré

1st Points classification
1st Stage 2

2nd Bordeaux–Paris
6th Overall Paris–Nice

1st Stage 5b

7th Milan–San Remo
9th Overall Four Days of Dunkirk
9th Giro di Lombardia
10th Overall Tour de France
10th Overall Tour de Suisse

1st Points classification

1970
1st Stage 3a Tour of the Basque Country
1st Stage 2 Grand Prix du Midi Libre
3rd Overall Paris–Nice

1st Stage 6

7th Paris–Roubaix
7th Gent–Wevelgem
8th Tour of Flanders
9th Overall Critérium du Dauphiné Libéré
Tour de France

Held after Stages 2 & 3a

1971
4th Paris–Roubaix
6th Overall Tour de la Nouvelle-France

1st Stage 5b

6th Tour of Flanders
7th Bruxelles–Meulebeke
9th Gent–Wevelgem
1972
1st Stage 2 Tour de Luxembourg
10th Rund um den Henninger Turm

=== Grand Tour general classification results timeline ===
Grand Tour	1962	1963	1964	1965	1966	1967	1968	1969	1970	1971	1972
Vuelta a España	—	—	—	—	—	1	6	—	—	—	—
Giro d'Italia	Did not contest during career										
Tour de France	—	DNF	24	9	2	5	1	10	26	—	—

=== Classics results timeline ===
Monuments results timeline
Monument	1962	1963	1964	1965	1966	1967	1968	1969	1970	1971	1972
Milan–San Remo	—	—	—	6	—	32	17	7	DNF	20	—
Tour of Flanders	—	13	11	—	44	9	3	17	8	6	13
Paris–Roubaix	—	3	8	—	2	1	8	—	7	4	—
Liège–Bastogne–Liège	—	9	—	11	—	—	—	—	—	—	—
Giro di Lombardia	—	—	7	—	9	9	4	9	—	—	—

=== Major championship results timeline ===
	1962	1963	1964	1965	1966	1967	1968	1969	1970	1971	1972
World Championships	31	7	1	43	—	2	DNF	—	16	36	—
National Championships	Did not contest during career										

Legend
—	Did not compete
DNF	Did not finish

== See also ==
- List of Dutch Olympic cyclists
- List of Dutch cyclists who have led the Tour de France general classification

== Notes ==
Awards
Preceded by Kees Verkerk	Dutch Sportsman of the Year; 1968	Succeeded by Tom Okker
