= Van Sweevelt =

Van Sweevelt is a surname that is mainly found in Belgium. Notable people with the surname include:

- Guido Van Sweevelt (born 1949), Belgian road bicycle racer
- Ronny Van Sweevelt (1962–2020), Belgian cyclist, brother of Valère
- Valère Van Sweevelt (born 1947), Belgian racing cyclist
