= 1961 Milan–San Remo =

Race details
- Dates: 18 March 1961
- Stages: 1
- Distance: 288 km (179 mi)
- Winning time: 7h 41' 07"

Results
	Winner	Raymond Poulidor (FRA)
	Second	Rik Van Looy (BEL)
	Third	Rino Benedetti (ITA)

The 1961 Milan–San Remo was the 52nd edition of the Milan–San Remo cycle race and was held on 18 March 1961. The race started in Milan and finished in San Remo. It was won by Raymond Poulidor, who earlier had to be encouraged by his director Antonin Magne not to give up after suffering a puncture. The peloton arrived 3 seconds later, with Rik Van Looy winning the sprint.

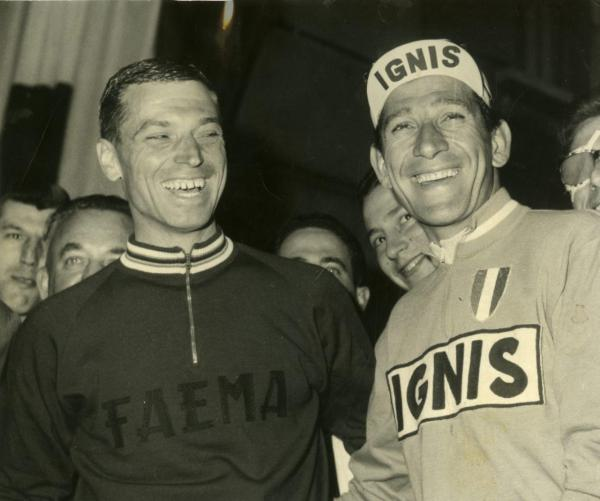
Rik Van Looy and Gastone Nencini at the start of the 1961 Milan-San Remo

== General classification ==
Final general classification

Rank	Rider	Time
1	Raymond Poulidor (FRA)	7h 41' 07"
2	Rik Van Looy (BEL)	+ 3"
3	Rino Benedetti (ITA)	+ 3"
4	Dino Bruni (ITA)	+ 3"
5	Michel Van Aerde (BEL)	+ 3"
6	Dino Liviero (ITA)	+ 3"
7	Walter Martin (ITA)	+ 3"
8	André Darrigade (FRA)	+ 3"
9	Pietro Musone (ITA)	+ 3"
10	Jo de Haan (NED)	+ 3"
