= 1960 Paris–Tours =

Race details
- Dates: 2 October 1960
- Stages: 1
- Distance: 267 km (165.9 mi)
- Winning time: 6h 41' 14"

Results
| | Winner | Jo de Haan (NED) | (Saint-Raphaël–R. Geminiani–Dunlop) |
| | Second | Michel Stolker (NED) | (Helyett–Leroux–Fynsec–Hutchinson) |
| | Third | Luis Otaño (ESP) | (Saint-Raphaël–R. Geminiani–Dunlop) |

The 1960 Paris–Tours was the 54th edition of the Paris–Tours cycle race and was held on 2 October 1960. The race started in Paris and finished in Tours. The race was won by Jo de Haan of the Saint-Raphaël team.

== General classification ==
Final general classification

| Rank | Rider | Team | Time |
|---|---|---|---|
| 1 | Jo de Haan (NED) | Saint-Raphaël–R. Geminiani–Dunlop | 6h 41' 14" |
| 2 | Michel Stolker (NED) | Helyett–Leroux–Fynsec–Hutchinson | + 2" |
| 3 | Luis Otaño (ESP) | Saint-Raphaël–R. Geminiani–Dunlop | + 27" |
| 4 | Edgard Sorgeloos (BEL) | Faema | + 27" |
| 5 | Norbert Kerckhove (BEL) | Faema | + 27" |
| 6 | Ercole Baldini (ITA) | Ignis | + 27" |
| 7 | Raymond Poulidor (FRA) | Mercier–BP–Hutchinson | + 27" |
| 8 | Jean Forestier (FRA) | Helyett–Leroux–Fynsec–Hutchinson | + 27" |
| 9 | Nino Defilippis (ITA) | Carpano | + 27" |
| 10 | Jef Planckaert (BEL) | Wiel's–Flandria | + 27" |
