= 1963 Liège–Bastogne–Liège =

Race details
- Dates: 5 May 1963
- Stages: 1
- Distance: 237 km (147 mi)
- Winning time: 5h 26' 28"

Results
	Winner	Frans Melckenbeeck (BEL)	(Mercier–BP–Hutchinson)
	Second	Pino Cerami (BEL)	(Peugeot–BP–Englebert)
	Third	Vittorio Adorni (ITA)	(Cynar–Frejus)

The 1963 Liège–Bastogne–Liège was the 49th edition of the Liège–Bastogne–Liège cycle race and was held on 5 May 1963. The race started and finished in Liège. The race was won by Frans Melckenbeeck of the Mercier team.

== General classification ==
Final general classification

Rank	Rider	Team	Time
1	Frans Melckenbeeck (BEL)	Mercier–BP–Hutchinson	5h 26' 28"
2	Pino Cerami (BEL)	Peugeot–BP–Englebert	+ 0"
3	Vittorio Adorni (ITA)	Cynar–Frejus	+ 0"
4	Jo de Roo (NED)	Saint-Raphaël–Gitane–R. Geminiani	+ 0"
5	Raymond Poulidor (FRA)	Mercier–BP–Hutchinson	+ 0"
6	Frans Schoubben (BEL)	Peugeot–BP–Englebert	+ 9"
7	Jo de Haan (NED)	Peugeot–BP–Englebert	+ 9"
8	Alan Ramsbottom (GBR)	Pelforth–Sauvage–Lejeune	+ 9"
9	Jan Janssen (NED)	Pelforth–Sauvage–Lejeune	+ 9"
10	Georges Van Coningsloo (BEL)	Solo–Terrot	+ 9"
