= Aaron Verwilst =

Belgian cyclist

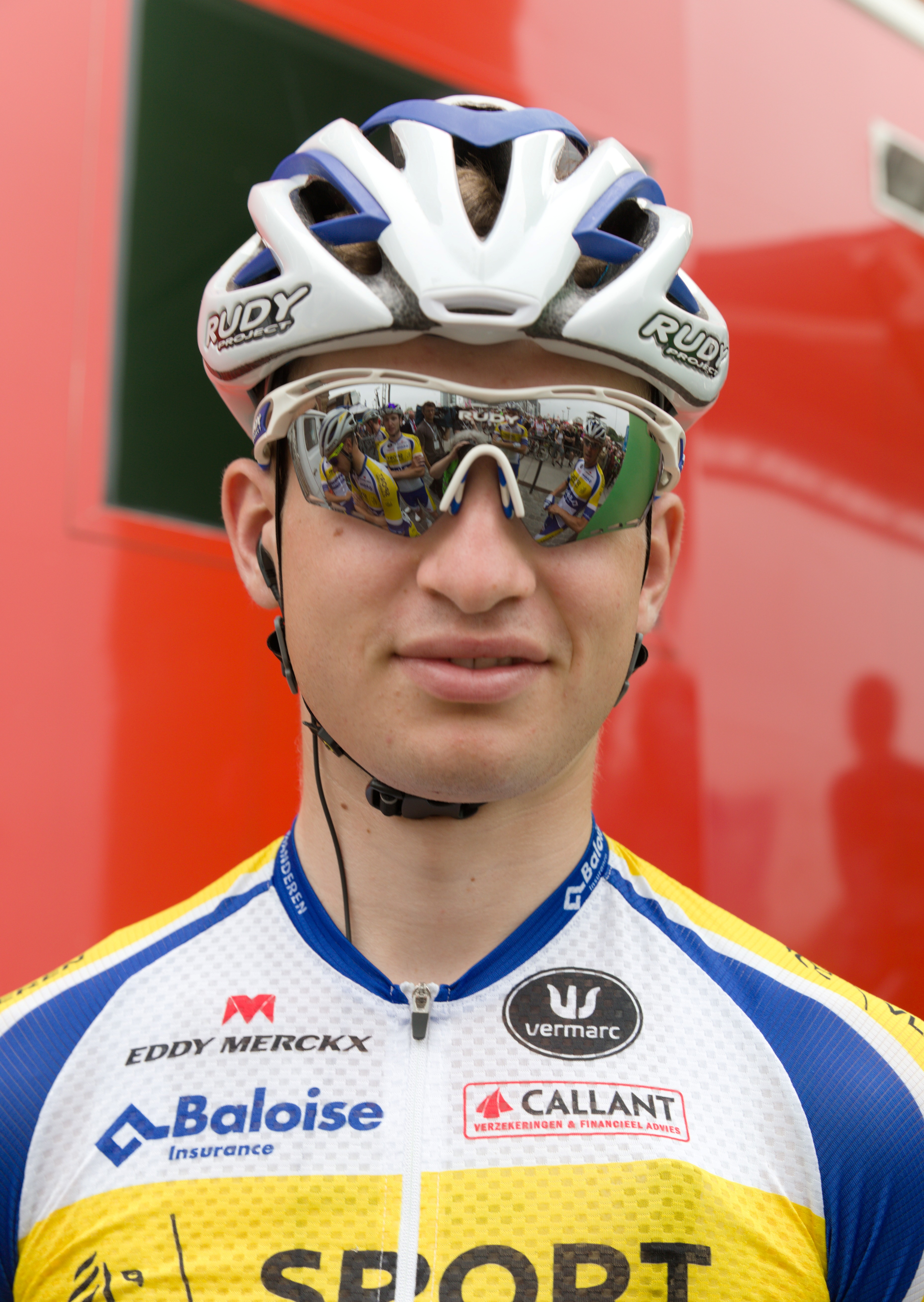
- Verwilst in 2018

Personal information
- Full name: Aaron Verwilst
- Born: 2 May 1997 (age 29) Ruiselede, Belgium
- Height: 1.81 m (5 ft 11 in)
- Weight: 68 kg (150 lb)

Cycling career
- Sport: Cycling
- Discipline: Road
- Role: Rider

Amateur teams
- 2014–2015: Tieltse Rennersclub
- 2016–2017: Lotto–Soudal U23

Professional team
- 2018–2021: Sport Vlaanderen–Baloise

Aaron Verwilst (born 2 May 1997) is a Belgian cyclist, who last rode for UCI ProTeam Team Flanders–Baloise.

== Major results ==
2014
1st Junior Tour of Flanders
6th Overall Keizer der Juniores
2015
2nd Junior Tour of Flanders
2nd Overall Internationale Niedersachsen-Rundfahrt
4th Road race, UEC European Junior Road Championships
7th Overall Trophée Centre Morbihan
9th Overall GP Général Patton
10th Overall Grand Prix Rüebliland
2017
2nd Omloop Het Nieuwsblad U23
2019
5th Paris–Chauny
2022
7th Omloop Mandel-Leie-Schelde
8th Oost Vlaamse Sluitingsprijs
