= 1976 Grand Prix d'Automne =

Race details
- Dates: 26 September 1976
- Stages: 1
- Distance: 253 km (157.2 mi)
- Winning time: 5h 49' 30"

Results
	Winner	Ronald De Witte (BEL)
	Second	Raymond Poulidor (FRA)
	Third	Robert Bouloux (FRA)

The 1976 Grand Prix d'Automne was the 70th edition of the Paris–Tours cycle race and was held on 26 September 1976. The race started in Tours and finished in Versailles. The race was won by Ronald De Witte.

== General classification ==
Final general classification

Rank	Rider	Time
1	Ronald De Witte (BEL)	5h 49' 30"
2	Raymond Poulidor (FRA)	+ 1"
3	Robert Bouloux (FRA)	+ 2"
4	Frans Van Looy (BEL)	+ 27"
5	Jean-Luc Vandenbroucke (BEL)	+ 27"
6	Jean-Jacques Fussien (FRA)	+ 27"
7	Jan Aling (NED)	+ 27"
8	Jan Raas (NED)	+ 27"
9	Geert Malfait (BEL)	+ 27"
10	Eric Van De Wiele (BEL)	+ 27"
