= 1966 Critérium du Dauphiné Libéré =

Race details
- Dates: 4–11 June 1966
- Stages: 7
- Distance: 1,613 km (1,002 mi)
- Winning time: 46h 13' 05"

Results
	Winner	Raymond Poulidor (FRA)	(Mercier–BP–Hutchinson)
	Second	Carlos Echeverría (ESP)	(Kas–Kaskol)
	Third	Francisco Gabica (ESP)	(Kas–Kaskol)
	Points	Lucien Aimar (FRA)	(Ford France–Hutchinson)
	Mountains	Joaquim Galera (ESP)	(Kas–Kaskol)
	Team	Kas–Kaskol	

The 1966 Critérium du Dauphiné Libéré was the 20th edition of the cycle race and was held from 4 June to 11 June 1966. The race started in Évian and finished at Grenoble. The race was won by Raymond Poulidor of the Mercier team.

== General classification ==
Final general classification

Rank	Rider	Team	Time
1	Raymond Poulidor (FRA)	Mercier–BP–Hutchinson	46h 13' 05"
2	Carlos Echeverría (ESP)	Kas–Kaskol	+ 2' 04"
3	Francisco Gabica (ESP)	Kas–Kaskol	+ 2' 26"
4	Christian Raymond (FRA)	Peugeot–BP–Michelin	+ 4' 48"
5	Lucien Aimar (FRA)	Ford France–Hutchinson	+ 5' 10"
6	Henri Guimbard (FRA)	Grammont–Tigra	+ 5' 18"
7	Gregorio San Miguel (ESP)	Kas–Kaskol	+ 6' 12"
8	Cees Haast (NED)	Televizier–Batavus	+ 8' 18"
9	Jean-Claude Theillière (FRA)	Ford France–Hutchinson	+ 11' 25"
10	Aurelio González (ESP)	Kas–Kaskol	+ 12' 44"
