= 1966 La Flèche Wallonne =

Race details
- Dates: 29 April 1966
- Stages: 1
- Distance: 223 km (138.6 mi)
- Winning time: 5h 46' 30"

Results
	Winner	Michele Dancelli (ITA)	(Molteni)
	Second	Lucien Aimar (FRA)	(Ford France–Hutchinson)
	Third	Rudi Altig (FRG)	(Molteni)

The 1966 La Flèche Wallonne was the 30th edition of La Flèche Wallonne cycle race and was held on 29 April 1966. The race started in Liège and finished in Marcinelle. The race was won by Michele Dancelli of the Molteni team.

== General classification ==
Final general classification

Rank	Rider	Team	Time
1	Michele Dancelli (ITA)	Molteni	5h 46' 30"
2	Lucien Aimar (FRA)	Ford France–Hutchinson	+ 0"
3	Rudi Altig (FRG)	Molteni	+ 0"
4	Jan Janssen (NED)	Pelforth–Sauvage–Lejeune	+ 1' 55"
5	Roger Swerts (BEL)	Mercier–BP–Hutchinson	+ 1' 55"
6	André Messelis (BEL)	Dr. Mann–Grundig	+ 1' 55"
7	Willy In 't Ven (BEL)	Dr. Mann–Grundig	+ 2' 50"
8	Rolf Wolfshohl (FRG)	Mercier–BP–Hutchinson	+ 2' 50"
9	Georges Van Coningsloo (BEL)	Peugeot–BP–Michelin	+ 3' 30"
10	Felice Gimondi (ITA)	Salvarani	+ 3' 30"
