= 1969 Tour du Haut Var =

Race details
- Dates: 3 March 1969
- Stages: 1
- Distance: 160 km (99.42 mi)
- Winning time: 4h 02' 35"

Results
	Winner	Raymond Poulidor (FRA)
	Second	Willy Monty (BEL)
	Third	Albert Van Vlierberghe (BEL)

The 1969 Tour du Haut Var was the inaugural edition of the Tour du Haut Var cycle race and was held on 3 March 1969. The race started in Nice and finished in Seillans. The race was won by Raymond Poulidor.

== General classification ==
Final general classification

Rank	Rider	Time
1	Raymond Poulidor (FRA)	4h 02' 35"
2	Willy Monty (BEL)	+ 2' 28"
3	Albert Van Vlierberghe (BEL)	+ 2' 28"
4	José Catieau (FRA)	+ 2' 28"
5	Jean-Pierre Genet (FRA)	+ 2' 28"
6	Jean-Louis Bodin (FRA)	+ 2' 28"
7	Jean-Claude Theillière (FRA)	+ 2' 28"
8	Wladimiro Panizza (ITA)	+ 2' 38"
9	Daniel Ducreux (FRA)	+ 2' 38"
10	Gianpaolo Cucchietti (ITA)	+ 2' 45"
