= Valère Van Sweevelt =

Belgian cyclist

Personal information
- Born: 15 April 1947 (age 79) Kuringen, Belgium

Cycling career
- Sport: Cycling
- Discipline: Road
- Role: Rider

Professional teams
- 1968: Smith's
- 1969: Faema
- 1970: Peugeot–BP–Michelin
- 1973: Goldor–Hercka

Major wins
- One-day races and Classics Liège–Bastogne–Liège (1968)

Valère Van Sweevelt (born 15 April 1947) is a Belgian former racing cyclist. He won the 1968 edition of the Liège–Bastogne–Liège.

Valère was the older brother of Belgian former racing cyclist Ronny Van Sweevelt.

== Major results ==
1966
1st Internationales Ernst-Sachs-Gedächtnis-Rennen
2nd Circuit du Hainaut
1967
1st Flèche Ardennaise
1st Ronde Van Vlaanderen Beloften
1968
1st Liège–Bastogne–Liège
Paris–Nice

1st Points classification
1st Stages 3 & 4b

1st Stage 3a Tour de Romandie
2nd Rund um den Henninger Turm
2nd Züri-Metzgete
4th Tour du Condroz
5th Nokere Koerse
7th Harelbeke–Antwerp–Harelbeke
7th Bruxelles–Meulebeke
8th Grand Prix Flandria
1969
3rd Omloop Het Volk
3rd Ronde van Limburg
4th Tour du Condroz
6th Gent–Wevelgem
9th Amstel Gold Race
1970
6th Omloop van de Fruitstreek
9th Grand Prix de Wallonie

=== Classics results timeline ===
Monument	1968	1969	1970
Milan–San Remo	12	95	—
Tour of Flanders	Did not contest		
Paris–Roubaix	—	—	24
Liège–Bastogne–Liège	1	—	—
Giro di Lombardia	Did not contest		

Legend
—	Did not compete
DNF	Did not finish
