= Jo de Haan =

Dutch cyclist (1936–2006)

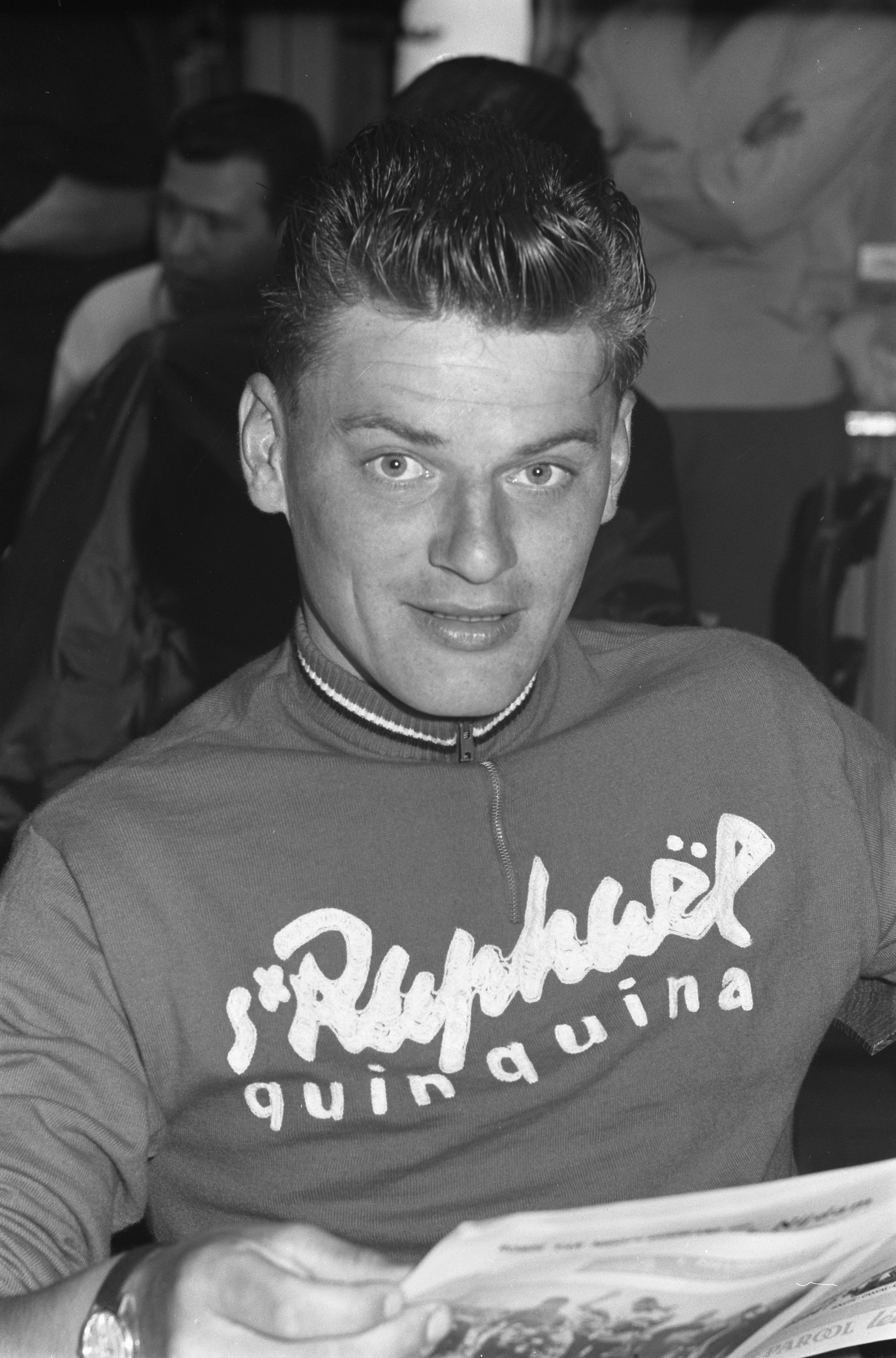
- Jo de Haan in 1961

Personal information
- Born: 25 December 1936 Klaaswaal, the Netherlands
- Died: 19 April 2006 (aged 69) Huijbergen, the Netherlands

Sport
- Sport: Cycling

Jo de Haan (25 December 1936 – 19 April 2006) was a Dutch cyclist who was active between 1956 and 1966. After winning four local road races as amateur in 1956 and 1958, he turned professional. His best achievements came in 1960 when he won the Paris–Tours and Tour de Picardie. In 1963 he finished third at the 1963 UCI Road World Championships. In total, he won 36 races during his career. He died of cancer.

== Major results ==
1958
1st Stage 3b Olympia's Tour
1959
1st GP Flandria
1st Circuit du Cher
1st Stage 7 Tour de l'Ouest
2nd Overall Tour de Champagne

1st Stages 2 & 3

3rd Nationale Sluitingprijs - Putte - Kapellen
7th Overall GP du Midi-Libre
1960
1st Overall Tour de Picardie

1st Stage 1

1st Paris–Tours
1st Paris-Valenciennes
6th Overall Deutschland Tour
1961
1st Stage 2b Roma-Napoli-Roma
1st Stage 5b Ronde van Nederland
3rd Tour of Flanders
4th Bordeaux-Paris
10th Overall Tour du Nord

1st Stage 4

10th Milan-San Remo
1962
1st Stage 2 Volta a la Comunitat Valenciana
1st Stage 2 4 Jours de Dunkerque
1st Stage 3 GP du Midi-Libre
8th La Flèche Wallonne
9th Bordeaux-Paris
1963
3rd Road race, UCI Road World Championships
7th Liège-Bastogne-Liège
1964
1st Stage 2 4 Jours de Dunkerque
6th Road race, UCI Road World Championships
