= 1964 UCI Road World Championships – Men's road race =

Men's Individual Road Race
1964 UCI Road World Championships
- Rainbow jersey

Race details
- Dates: 6 September 1964
- Stages: 1
- Distance: 290 km (180.2 mi)
- Winning time: 7h 35' 52"

Results
	Winner	Jan Janssen (NED)	(Netherlands)
	Second	Vittorio Adorni (ITA)	(Italy)
	Third	Raymond Poulidor (FRA)	(France)

The men's road race at the 1964 UCI Road World Championships was the 31st edition of the event. The race took place on Sunday 6 September 1964 in Sallanches, France. The race was won by Jan Janssen of the Netherlands.

== Final classification ==
General classification (1–10)

Rank	Rider	Time
1st place, gold medalist(s)	Jan Janssen (NED)	7h 35' 52"
2nd place, silver medalist(s)	Vittorio Adorni (ITA)	+ 0"
3rd place, bronze medalist(s)	Raymond Poulidor (FRA)	+ 0"
4	Tom Simpson (GBR)	+ 6"
5	Italo Zilioli (ITA)	+ 6"
6	Jo de Haan (NED)	+ 6"
7	Jacques Anquetil (FRA)	+ 6"
8	Fernando Manzaneque (ESP)	+ 38"
9	Jean Stablinski (FRA)	+ 38"
10	Franco Cribiori (ITA)	+ 38"
