= Victor Van Schil =

Belgian cyclist (1939–2009)

- Van Schil in 1973

Personal information
- Born: 21 December 1939 Nijlen, Belgium
- Died: 30 September 2009 (aged 69) Nijlen, Belgium

Cycling career
- Sport: Cycling
- Discipline: Road
- Role: Rider

Professional teams
- 1962–1966: Mercier–BP–Hutchinson
- 1967: Flandria–De Clerck
- 1968–1970: Faema
- 1971–1976: Molteni
- 1977: IJsboerke–Colnago

Victor "Vic" Van Schil (21 December 1939 – 30 September 2009) was a Belgian racing cyclist. He rode in 21 Grand Tours in his career, including 11 editions of the Tour de France, four editions of the Vuelta a España, and six editions of the Giro d'Italia.

== Career ==
Van Schil's main victories were two stages of the Vuelta a España, in 1964 and 1968, and the 1968 Brabantse Pijl. He also had success in the 1969 Liège–Bastogne–Liège, finishing alongside his teammate Eddy Merckx, eight minutes ahead of the next rider.

Van Schil was a teammate of Eddy Merckx for nine years, riding with him on Faema from 1968 to 1970, and Molteni from 1971 to 1976, and was known for being Merckx's main domestique. He also rode with Raymond Poulidor from 1962 to 1966 on Mercier–BP–Hutchinson.

== Death ==
Van Schil committed suicide at his home on 30 September 2009, at age 69, due to suffering from depression.

== Major results ==
1962
1st Tour du Condroz
3rd Scheldeprijs
1963
1st Schaal Sels
1964
1st Stage 11 Vuelta a España
2nd Brussels–Ingooigem
3rd Grand Prix du Midi Libre
3rd Overall Circuit du Provençal
1965
3rd Tour du Condroz
4th Paris–Roubaix
1966
1st Stage 1a Tour of Belgium
2nd Liège–Bastogne–Liège
1967
1st Overall Tour de Wallonie
1968
1st Stage 13 Vuelta a España
1st Brabantse Pijl
3rd Grand Prix Fayt-le-Franc
3rd Overall Tour de Wallonie
5th Paris–Roubaix
1969
1st Stage 4 Vuelta a Mallorca
2nd Schaal Sels
2nd Liège–Bastogne–Liège
2nd Brussels–Ingooigem
1970
1st Tour du Condroz
2nd Brabantse Pijl
1972
1st Tour du Condroz
2nd Züri-Metzgete
3rd Grand Prix Monaco
9th Liège–Bastogne–Liège
1973
2nd Brabantse Pijl
2nd Grote Prijs Jef Scherens
2nd Schaal Sels
1976
2nd Druivenkoers Overijse
