= 1968 UCI Road World Championships – Men's road race =

Men's Individual Road Race
1968 UCI Road World Championships
- Rainbow jersey

Race details
- Dates: 1 September 1968
- Stages: 1
- Distance: 277.3 km (172.3 mi)
- Winning time: 7h 27' 39"

Results
	Winner	Vittorio Adorni (ITA)	(Italy)
	Second	Herman Van Springel (BEL)	(Belgium)
	Third	Michele Dancelli (ITA)	(Italy)

The men's road race at the 1968 UCI Road World Championships was the 35th edition of the event. The race took place on Sunday 1 September 1968 in Imola, Italy. The race was won by Vittorio Adorni of Italy after a successful 90 km breakaway from the leading group on the 4th lap.

== Final classification ==
General classification (1–10)

Rank	Rider	Time
1st place, gold medalist(s)	Vittorio Adorni (ITA)	7h 27' 39"
2nd place, silver medalist(s)	Herman Van Springel (BEL)	+ 9' 50"
3rd place, bronze medalist(s)	Michele Dancelli (ITA)	+ 10' 18"
4	Franco Bitossi (ITA)	+ 10' 18"
5	Vito Taccone (ITA)	+ 10' 18"
6	Felice Gimondi (ITA)	+ 10' 18"
7	Raymond Poulidor (FRA)	+ 10' 18"
8	Eddy Merckx (BEL)	+ 10' 18"
9	Jean Jourden (FRA)	+ 10' 18"
10	Lucien Aimar (FRA)	+ 10' 18"
