= Leen Poortvliet =

Dutch cyclist

Personal information
- Born: 20 July 1943 (age 83)

Cycling career
- Sport: Cycling
- Role: Rider

Leen Poortvliet (born 20 July 1943) is a Dutch racing cyclist. He rode in the 1969 Tour de France and won the 16th 4 Jours de Dunkerque / Tour du Nord-pas-de-Calais(SPP) in 1970.
