= Giannino Bianco =

Italian cyclist

Personal information
- Born: 24 October 1944
- Died: 26 November 2016 (aged 72)

Cycling career
- Sport: Cycling
- Role: Rider

Giannino Bianco (24 October 1944 – 26 November 2016) was an Italian racing cyclist. He rode in the 1969 Tour de France.
