= 1967 UCI Road World Championships – Men's road race =

Men's Individual Road Race
1967 UCI Road World Championships
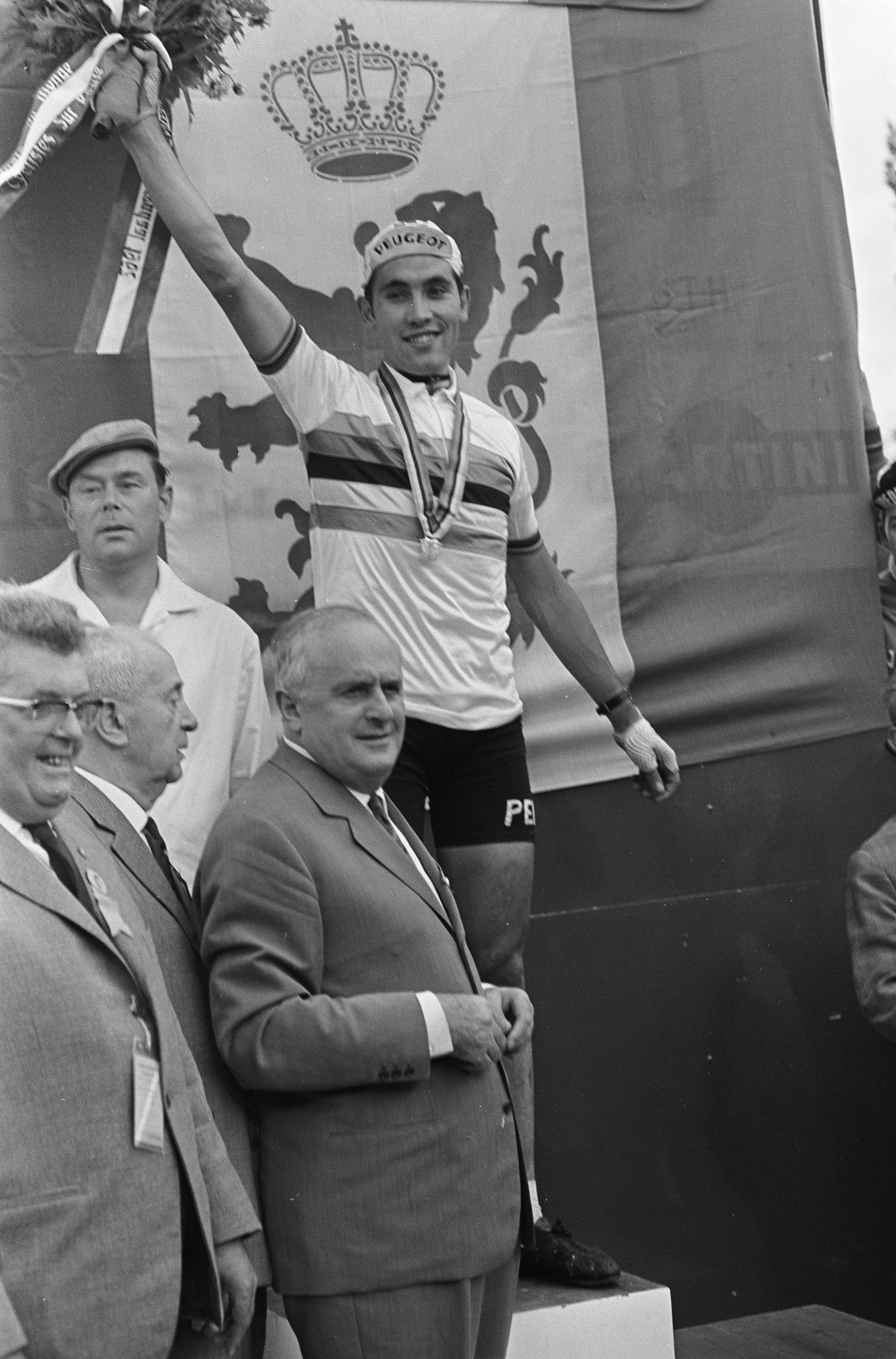
- Eddy Merckx on the podium in the rainbow jersey

Race details
- Dates: 3 September 1967
- Stages: 1
- Distance: 265.2 km (164.8 mi)
- Winning time: 6h 44' 42"

Results
	Winner	Eddy Merckx (BEL)	(Belgium)
	Second	Jan Janssen (NED)	(Netherlands)
	Third	Ramón Sáez (ESP)	(Spain)

The men's road race at the 1967 UCI Road World Championships was the 34th edition of the event. The race took place on Sunday 3 September 1967 in Heerlen, the Netherlands. The race was won by Eddy Merckx of Belgium.

== Final classification ==
General classification (1–10)

Rank	Rider	Time
1st place, gold medalist(s)	Eddy Merckx (BEL)	6h 44' 42"
2nd place, silver medalist(s)	Jan Janssen (NED)	+ 0"
3rd place, bronze medalist(s)	Ramón Sáez (ESP)	+ 0"
4	Gianni Motta (ITA)	+ 0"
~~5~~	~~Jos van der Vleuten (NED)~~	~~+ 0"~~ (Note: Van der Vleuten was disqualified for a positive dope test.)
6	José Manuel Lasa (ESP)	+ 2' 05"
7	Daniel Van Ryckeghem (BEL)	+ 2' 05"
8	Michele Dancelli (ITA)	+ 2' 05"
9	Jozef Boons (BEL)	+ 2' 05"
10	Robert Hagmann (SUI)	+ 2' 05"
