= Raymond Poulidor =

French cyclist (1936–2019)

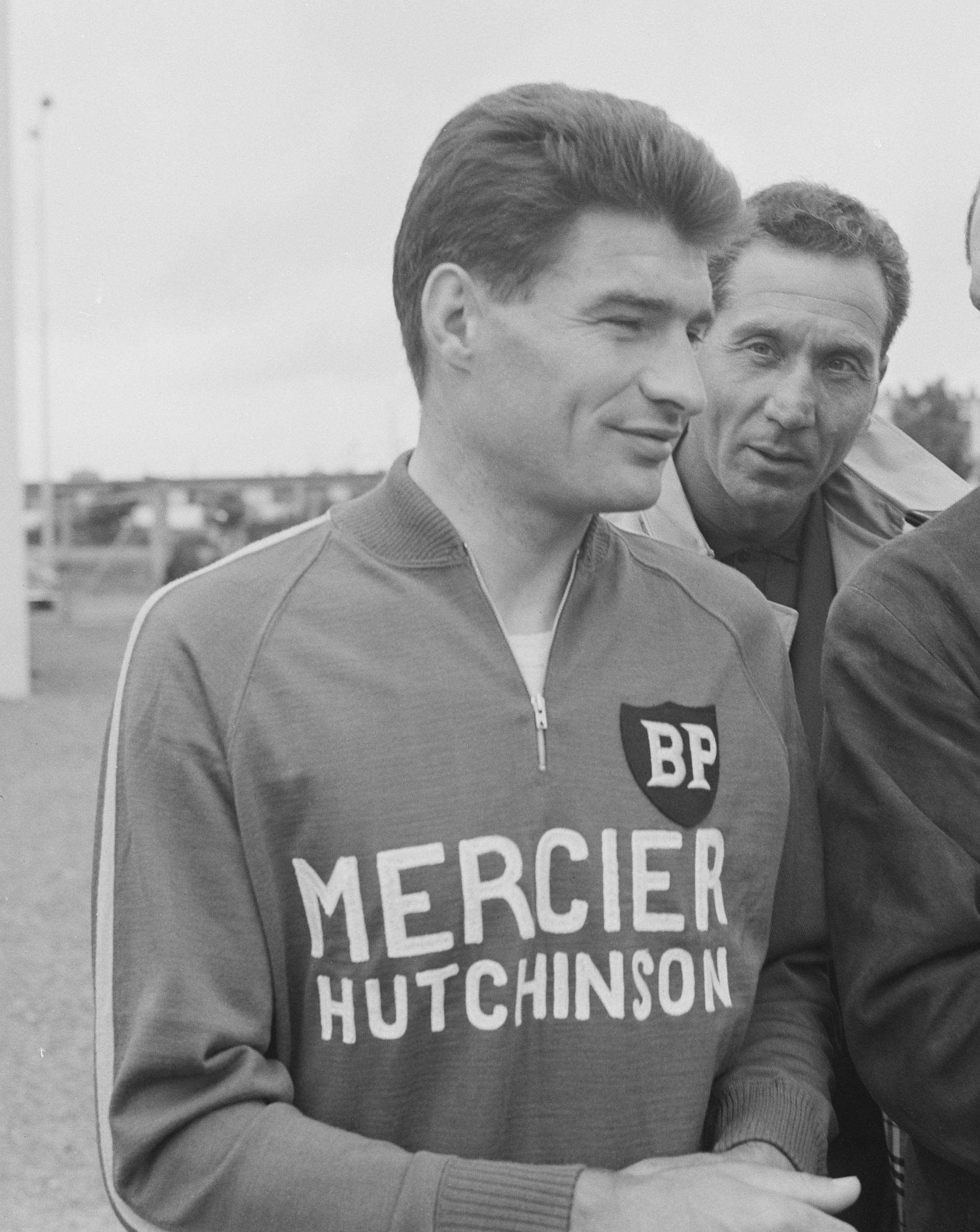
- Poulidor at the 1966 Tour de France

Personal information
- Full name: Raymond Poulidor
- Nicknames: Pou-Pou; The Eternal Second
- Born: 15 April 1936 Masbaraud-Mérignat, France
- Died: 13 November 2019 (aged 83) Saint-Léonard-de-Noblat, France
- Height: 1.73 m (5 ft 8 in)
- Weight: 71 kg (157 lb; 11 st 3 lb)

Cycling career
- Sport: Cycling
- Discipline: Road
- Role: Rider
- Rider type: All-rounder

Professional team
- 1960–1977: Mercier–BP–Hutchinson

Major wins
- Grand Tours Tour de France 7 individual stages (1962, 1964, 1965, 1966, 1967, 1974) Vuelta a España General classification (1964) 4 individual stages (1964, 1965, 1967) Stage races Critérium du Dauphiné Libéré (1966, 1969) Paris–Nice (1972, 1973) One-day races and Classics National Road Race Championships (1961) Milan–San Remo (1961) La Flèche Wallonne (1963)
Medal record
Representing France
Men's road bicycle racing
World Championships
Silver medal – second place	1974 Montréal	Road race
Bronze medal – third place	1961 Bern	Road race
Bronze medal – third place	1964 Sallanches	Road race
Bronze medal – third place	1966 Nürburgring	Road race

Raymond Poulidor (French pronunciation: [ʁɛmɔ̃ pulidɔʁ]; 15 April 1936 – 13 November 2019), nicknamed "Pou-Pou" (pronounced [pu pu]), was a French professional racing cyclist, who rode for Mercier his entire career.

His distinguished career coincided with two other outstanding riders – Jacques Anquetil and Eddy Merckx. This underdog position may have been the reason Poulidor was a favourite of the public. He was known as "The Eternal Second", because he never won the Tour de France despite finishing in second place three times, and in third place five times (including his final Tour at the age of 40). Despite his consistency, he never wore the yellow jersey as leader of the general classification in 14 Tours (of which he completed 12). He did win one Grand Tour, the 1964 Vuelta a España. Of the eighteen Grand Tours that he entered in his career, he finished in the top 10 fifteen times.

== Early life and amateur career ==
Raymond Poulidor was the son of Martial and Maria Poulidor, small farmers outside the hamlet of Masbaraud-Mérignat, where the Creuse region east of Limoges meets the département of Haute-Vienne. Poulidor began working on the farm where, he remembered, "the soil was poor and we had to work hard; farming incomes were poor." The need for working hands on the farm meant he left school at 14 even though he wanted to continue his studies. Local entertainment went little further than village fairs, with coconut shies, sack-races, competitions for bottles of home-made jam... and inter-village cycle races. Poulidor continued to help out on his parents' farm even after he turned professional.

Poulidor was given his first bike by a local shop owner at the age of 14. He started racing bicycles at the age of 16, picking up the interest from the magazine Miroir-Sprint given to him by one of his school teachers. He initially hid his passion from his mother, who was afraid of the dangers the sport entailed.

It was only when Poulidor was taken into the army for compulsory national service in 1955 that he first travelled in a train. Pierre Chany, a French reporter who followed 49 Tours de France, drew the comparison with Poulidor's eventual rival, Jacques Anquetil: by the time Poulidor first stepped into a train, Anquetil had already been to Helsinki, ridden the Olympic Games, won a medal for France, turned professional and won the Grand Prix des Nations. Yet there was less than two years between them.

The army sent Poulidor to the war then going on in Algeria, where he worked as a driver and put on 12 kg through lack of exercise. In 1960 he dedicated himself to cycling again and lost the weight in a month. He won his first race after army service by six minutes. When he then came second in the GP de Peyrat-le-Château and won 80,000 old francs, he calculated that he had won more in one race than he would have earned in six years on the farm.

== Professional career ==
Poulidor turned professional in 1960 with the Mercier team, directed by former Tour winner Antonin Magne. Magne offered Poulidor 25,000 old francs a month. Poulidor asked for 30,000. Magne countered that that was more than he paid Gauthier and Louis Privat and refused. Later, aware that he had a rival for Anquetil, he conceded.

In just his second season, Poulidor won Milan–San Remo, one of cycling's "monument classics". 125 km (78 mi) from the finish, he was about to abandon after he suffered a puncture and was two minutes behind the leading riders. Magne convinced him to continue and Poulidor bridged the gap. On the climb of the Capo Berta, he attacked, joined by Albertus Geldermans and teammate Jean-Claude Annaert, who set the tempo until they reached the foot of the final climb, the Poggio. Here, Poulidor attacked again and opened a gap. Despite being guided in the wrong direction by a police man in the final corner, he was able to hold off the chasing field by three seconds to take the victory. Also in 1961, he became French road race champion.

=== The Anquetil years ===
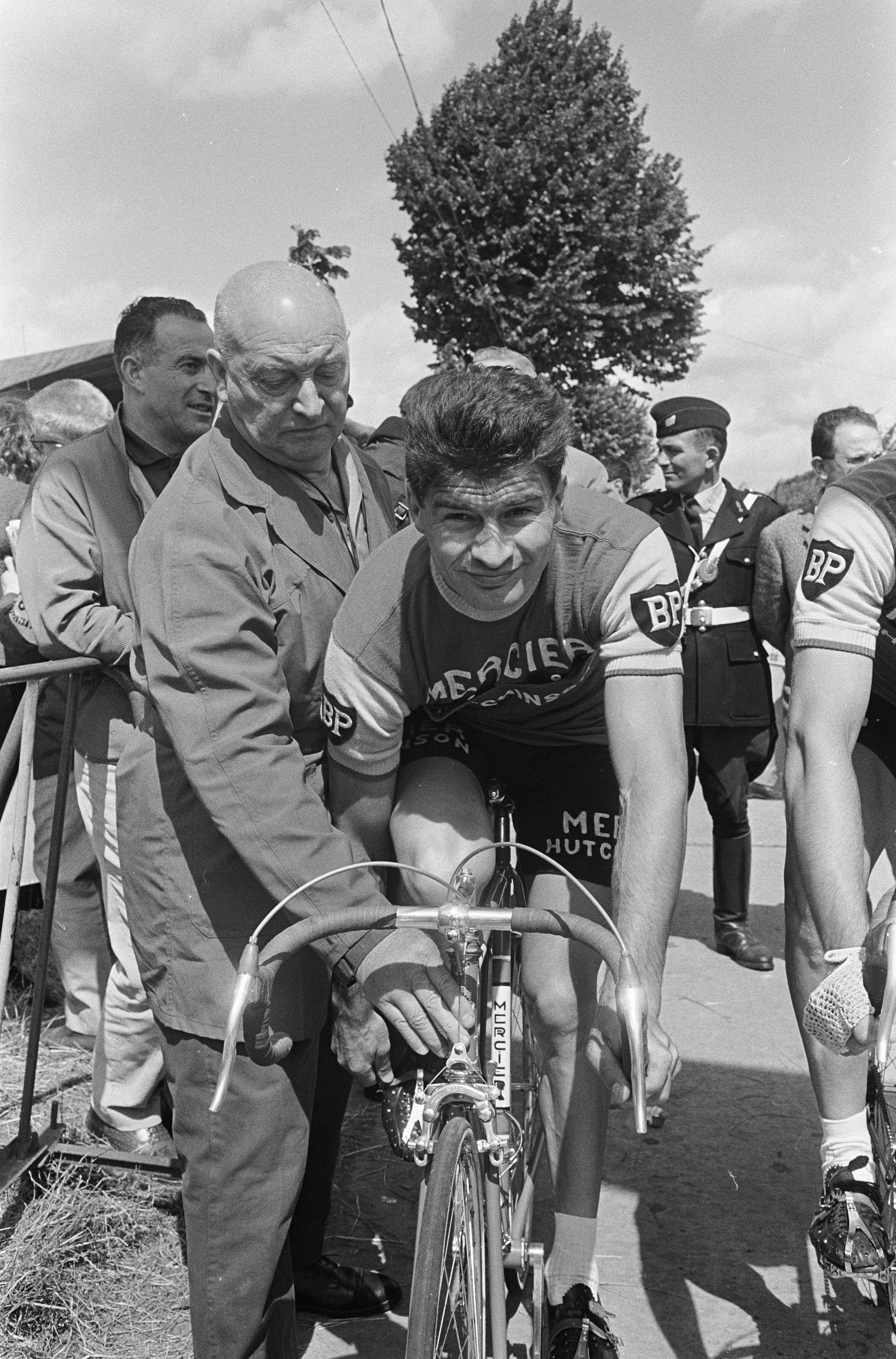
Poulidor at the 1966 Tour de France

Poulidor's rivalry with Anquetil is a legend in cycling. While a good climber, Poulidor had a hard time matching Anquetil in the individual time trial, often having victory snatched from him by losing time in time-trial stages of the Tour de France.

Poulidor's riding style was aggressive and attacking, whereas Anquetil preferred to control the race in the mountains and win time in the time-trials. Poulidor became the darling of the French public, to the ire of Anquetil. Poulidor's mid-France upbringing and his slow Limousin speech also contrasted with Anquetil's northern background and sharper accent. Poulidor's face was deeply tanned and furrowed; Anquetil had high cheekbones, a smoother face and brushed-up blond hair.

Poulidor's best chance of defeating Anquetil came in the 1964 Tour de France, in the finish on the Puy de Dôme. Anquetil rode beside Poulidor but both were so exhausted that only in the last few hundred metres could Poulidor take nearly enough time to threaten Anquetil's first place in the general classification. The Tour organiser, Jacques Goddet, was behind the pair as they turned off the main road and climbed through what police estimated as half a million spectators.

Anquetil rode on the inside by the mountain wall while Poulidor took the outer edge by the precipice. They could sometimes feel the other's hot gasps on their bare arms. At the end, Anquetil cracked, after a battle of wills and legs so intense that at times they banged elbows. Poulidor says he was so tired that he has no memory of the two touching, although a photograph shows that they did. Of Anquetil, the veteran French reporter Pierre Chany wrote: "His face, until then purple, lost all its colour; the sweat ran down in drops through the creases of his cheeks." Anquetil was only semiconscious, he said. Poulidor gained time but when they reached Paris, Anquetil still had a 55-second lead and won his last Tour de France thanks to the time-trial on the final day.

=== Anquetil-Poulidor: the social significance ===
Anquetil unfailingly beat Poulidor in the Tour de France and yet Poulidor remained the more popular. "The more unlucky I was, the more the public liked me and the more money I earned", he said. Divisions between fans became marked, which two sociologists studying the impact of the Tour on French society say became emblematic of France old and new. Research showed that more than 4,000 newspaper articles appeared about him in France in just 1974 and that no other rider "had ever incited so many sociological investigations, so many university theses, seeking to find the cause of his prodigious popularity."

=== Poupou, the nickname ===
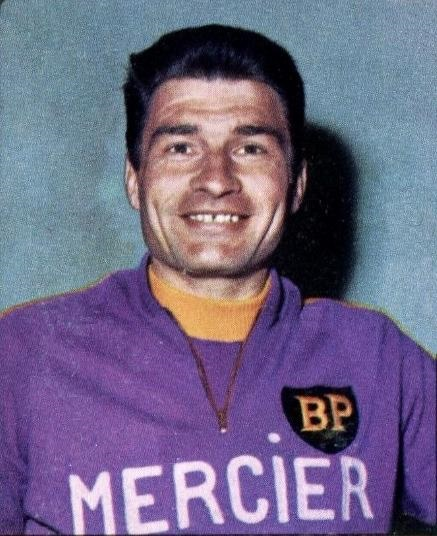
Poulidor in 1968

Poulidor's original nickname was Pouli. It was Émile Besson of the daily newspaper L'Humanité who first wrote of Poupou. The name was taken up throughout France, leading to headlines such as "Poupoularité" in L'Équipe. A poupée is a doll and the nickname hints at that and follows the French tradition of repeating the first syllable of a word in childspeak. Poulidor never liked the name but accepted it.

=== The Merckx years ===
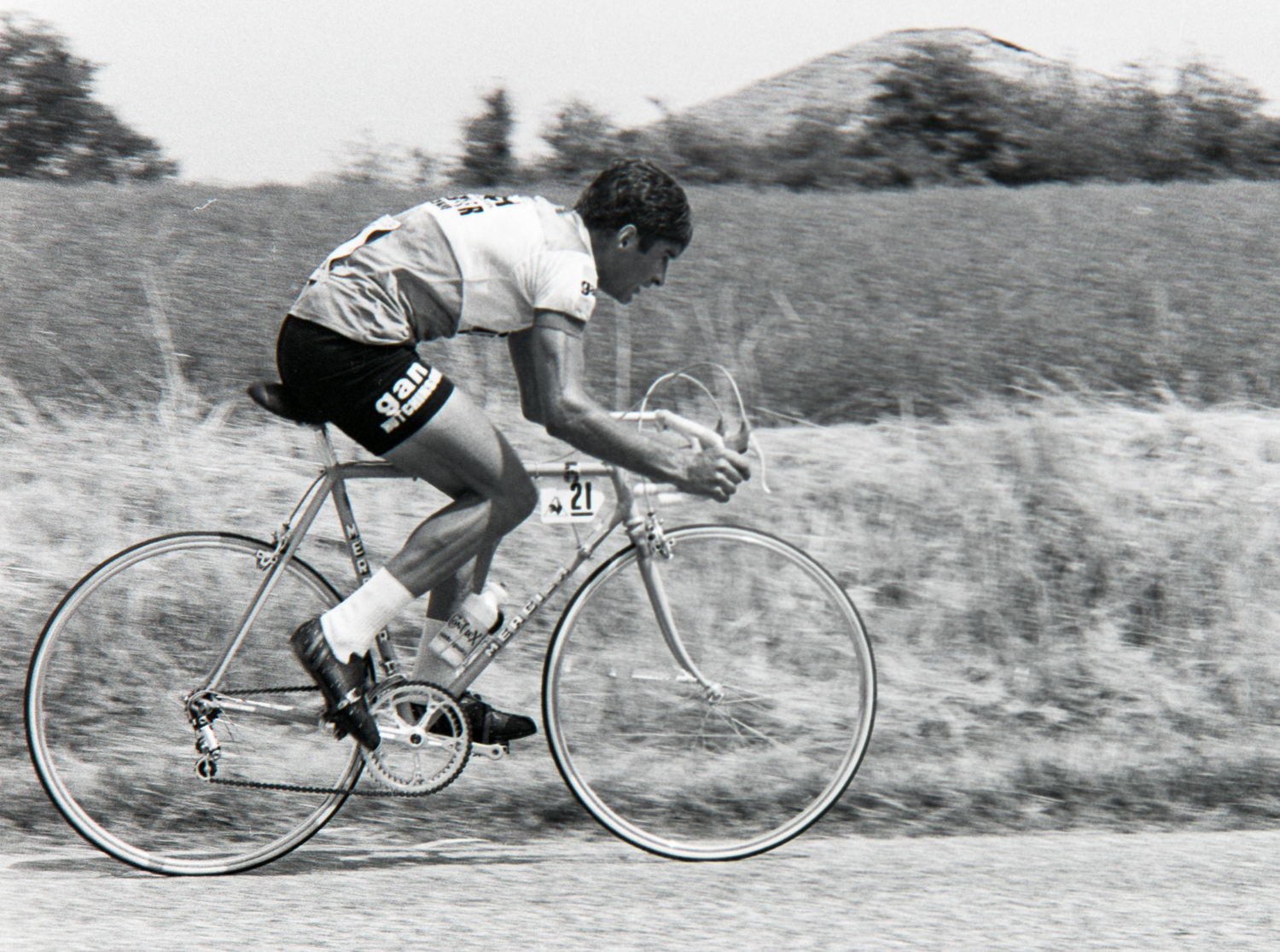
Poulidor at the 1976 Tour de France

The end of the Anquetil era presented opportunities for Poulidor to finally win the Tour de France. This was not to be due to injuries in 1967 and 1968, and the arrival of Eddy Merckx in 1969. Poulidor was no match for Merckx, although he offered much resistance.

In the 1973 Tour Poulidor almost lost his life on the descent from the Col de Portet d'Aspet when he plunged into a ravine, taking a serious blow to the head and crawling out with the help of the race director, Jacques Goddet.

=== Poulidor and Dr Mabuse ===
Antonin Magne remained manager of Poulidor's Mercier team until 1970, when he was replaced by another former rider, Louis Caput. Caput brought with him as deputy directeur sportif a man who described himself as a homeopath, Bernard Sainz. Sainz is known in cycling as Dr Mabuse, after a pulp-fiction character created by Norbert Jacques. Mabuse is a criminal mastermind who becomes rich through hypnotic powers. He plots to take over the world but is foiled by the police. From his cell he masterminds criminal plots by writing endless gibberish. Sainz recognises the nickname and used it in the name of his autobiography.

Sainz is a former velodrome rider of national level who stopped racing after a fall and became involved in horse racing, where he was twice convicted of maltreating horses. It was in horse-racing, where he turned unremarkable animals into champions, that he acquired his nickname. He has been repeatedly investigated by police and has been convicted of illegally practising medicine and incitement to doping. Sainz claims that he only engages in homeopathic treatment, though whatever methods he engages in are effective, casting doubt on this claim.

Louis Caput approached Edmond Mercier, the bicycle-maker behind Poulidor's team, and asked to bring Sainz into the team management. Mercier agreed, said Sainz, because he was already treating Mercier for his own health problems. Mercier had also brought in the insurance company, GAN, as main sponsor. GAN, said Sainz, demanded that Poulidor be in the team photo even if all he did was train with the team at the start of the season. In 1971 Poulidor had decided against riding any more. The tactic, Sainz said, was bluff, to increase his motivation. In Paris–Nice, the first important stage race of the season, Poulidor was 22 seconds behind Eddy Merckx on the morning of the last day. Poulidor attacked from the start, setting a speed record on the Col de la Turbie that stood for more than 10 years and won Paris–Nice by two seconds. Next year he won Paris–Nice again and also the Critérium du Dauphiné Libéré.

== Drug testing ==
Raymond Poulidor was the first rider to be tested for drugs in the Tour de France. Testers arrived at the Tour for the first time in 1966, in Bordeaux, although only after word had spread and many riders had left their hotels. The first competitor they found was Poulidor.

A few other riders were found, including Rik Van Looy, and some obliged and others refused. Next morning, the race left the city on the way to the Pyrenees and stopped in the suburb of Gradignan, in the university area of La House. The riders climbed off and began walking, shouting protests in general and in particular abuse at the race doctor, Pierre Dumas, whom some demanded should also take a test to see if he'd been drinking wine or taking aspirin to make his own job easier. Riders also criticised Poulidor for accepting to be tested. He dismissed their protests and stayed at the back of the strike. Other prominent riders, including Jacques Anquetil, were at the front. Poulidor said his indifference to the controls and the strike harmed his relations with fellow riders. "After that, they did me no favours in the peloton", he said.

== Retirement and death ==
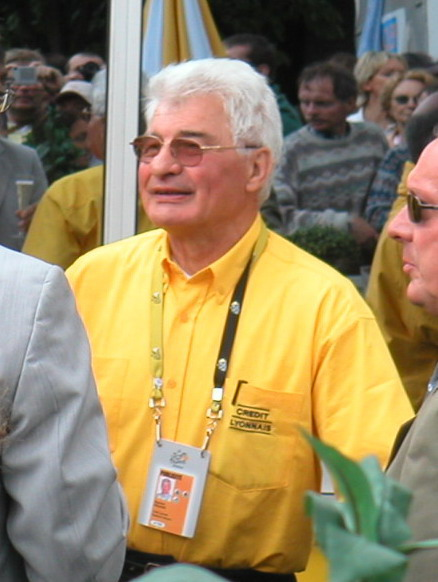
Poulidor at the 2004 Tour de France

Poulidor has several times accepted that his career was handicapped by a lack of ambition and by the psychological domination of Jacques Anquetil. Poulidor said in an interview in 1992: I knew straight away that I was getting places everywhere. I got all the leaders' jerseys but I used to lose them. Tonin [Magne] said to me "Raymond, you're always in a daydream!" And was that true? Were you distracted? It was true. I thought what was happening to me was already marvellous enough. I never thought of winning. Never, ever, did I get up in the morning with the idea of winning!

On 25 January 1973 Poulidor was made a Chevalier de la Légion d'honneur. In 2003 the President, Jacques Chirac increased the award. Poulidor also has a rose named after him, reflecting his love of gardening in general and roses in particular.

He lived with his wife Gisèle in Saint-Léonard-de-Noblat, east of Limoges, where he made short trips on his mountain bike. Their daughter, Corinne, is married to the former world cyclo-cross champion and Tour of Flanders winner Adri van der Poel. His grandsons David and Mathieu van der Poel are also cyclists: Mathieu became cyclo-cross world champion eight times, road world champion once and won three of the five Monuments as well as a stage in the 2021 Tour de France at which he dedicated his win and yellow jersey to his grandfather.

Poulidor worked in public relations for Crédit Lyonnais, sponsor of the yellow jersey, during the Tour. He had bicycles made under his name by the France-Loire company, and has appeared in television commercials aimed at older people.

When asked about his longevity compared to fellow cyclists, Poulidor said he took things in moderation and did not overstretch himself.

Poulidor has written several biographies, the first of which was Gloire sans le Maillot Jaune, written in 1964. Poulidor Intime was published in May 2007 by Éditions Jacob-Duvernet in France. In 2004 he helped write Poulidor par Raymond Poulidor with the radio reporter Jean-Paul Brouchon. The preface is by Eddy Merckx.

On 13 November 2019, Raymond Poulidor died in Saint-Léonard-de-Noblat. He had been in a hospital for two months prior, having suffered from heart problems. In 2008, the artist Sanfourche created a lithograph in tribute to his sporting achievements

== Career achievements ==
=== Major results ===
1959
3rd Grand Prix d'Oradour-sur-Vayres
1960
1st Bordeaux–Saintes
2nd Circuit des Boucles de la Seine
3rd Overall Grand Prix de Fourmies
4th Overall Grand Prix du Midi Libre
5th Road race, UCI Road World Championships
6th Overall Tour du Sud-Est

1st Stage 2

7th Paris–Tours
7th Circuit de l'Aulne
8th Grand Prix d'Isbergues
10th Overall Critérium du Dauphiné Libéré
1961
1st Road race, National Road Championships
1st Milan–San Remo
1st Mont Faron Hill Climb
2nd Overall Four Days of Dunkirk

1st Mountains classification

3rd Road race, UCI Road World Championships
3rd Overall Grand Prix du Midi Libre
3rd Genoa–Nice
3rd Grand Prix de Cannes
4th Manx Trophy
7th Bordeaux–Paris
9th Overall Paris–Nice
9th Paris–Brussels
10th Gran Premio di Lugano
1962
2nd Mont Faron Hill Climb
3rd Overall Tour de France

1st Stage 19

3rd Overall Critérium du Dauphiné Libéré
5th Paris–Roubaix
6th Overall Tour du Sud-Est
7th Overall Paris–Nice
8th Overall Grand Prix du Midi Libre
10th Overall Tour du Var
1963
1st La Flèche Wallonne
1st Grand Prix des Nations
1st Gran Premio di Lugano
2nd Overall Critérium National de la Route

1st Stage 1

2nd Overall Tour du Sud-Est
2nd Genoa–Nice
2nd Grand Prix de Cannes
2nd Trofeo Baracchi (with Jacques Anquetil)
3rd Overall Paris–Luxembourg

1st Stage 2

3rd Paris–Tours
5th Road race, UCI Road World Championships
5th Liège–Bastogne–Liège
5th Grand Prix du Parisien (TTT)
6th Paris–Roubaix
8th Overall Tour de France
8th Circuit de l'Aulne
9th Tour of Flanders
10th Critérium des As
1964
1st Overall Vuelta a España

1st Stage 15 (ITT)

1st Overall Critérium National de la Route

1st Stage 3 (ITT)

1st Grand Prix de Cannes
1st Stage 7 Paris–Nice
1st Stage 2a Circuit du Provençal
2nd Overall Tour de France

1st Stage 15

2nd Overall Critérium du Dauphiné Libéré

1st Stages 2 & 4a (ITT)

2nd Milan–San Remo
3rd Road race, UCI Road World Championships
4th Overall Paris–Luxembourg
6th Trofeo Baracchi (with Henry Anglade)
1965
1st Overall Escalada a Montjuïc

1st Stages 1a & 1b (ITT)

2nd Road race, National Road Championships
2nd Overall Tour de France

1st Stages 5b (ITT) & 14

2nd Overall Vuelta a España

1st Stages 4a (ITT) & 16 (ITT)
Held after Stages 4a–7

2nd Overall Critérium du Dauphiné Libéré
2nd Overall Critérium National de la Route

1st Stage 2

3rd Grand Prix des Nations
4th Overall Paris–Nice
4th Trofeo Baracchi (with Georges Chappe)
6th Overall Circuit du Provençal

1st Stage 3a

6th Giro di Lombardia
10th Circuit de l'Aulne
10th Genoa–Nice
1966
1st Overall Critérium du Dauphiné Libéré

1st Stage 7b (ITT)

1st Overall Critérium National de la Route

1st Stage 3 (ITT)

1st Subida a Arrate
1st Mont Faron Hill Climb
2nd Overall Paris–Nice

1st Stages 6b (ITT)

2nd Trofeo Baracchi (with Georges Chappe)
3rd Road race, UCI Road World Championships
3rd Overall Tour de France

1st Stage 14b (ITT)

3rd Giro di Lombardia
3rd Grand Prix d'Aix-en-Provence
3rd Critérium des As
5th Genoa–Nice
5th Grand Prix des Nations
6th Overall Escalada a Montjuïc
7th Milan–San Remo
9th Paris–Tours
9th Circuit des Boucles de la Seine
1967
1st Overall Escalada a Montjuïc

1st Stage 1b (ITT)

1st Circuit de l'Aulne
1st Bol d'Or des Monédières Chaumeil
1st A Travers Lausanne
2nd Critérium National de la Route
3rd Overall Grand Prix du Midi Libre
3rd Giro di Lombardia
3rd Polymultipliée
5th Circuit des Boucles de la Seine
5th Trofeo Baracchi (with Roger Pingeon)
6th GP du canton d'Argovie
7th Paris–Roubaix
7th Coppa Agostoni
7th Gran Premio di Lugano
8th Overall Vuelta a España

1st Stage 15b (ITT)

9th Overall Tour de France

1st Stage 22b (ITT)

1968
1st Overall Escalada a Montjuïc

1st Stages 1a & 1b (ITT)

1st Critérium National de la Route
1st Subida a Arrate
2nd Circuit de l'Aulne
2nd Critérium des As
3rd Overall Four Days of Dunkirk

1st Stage 3b (ITT)

3rd Overall A Travers Lausanne
3rd Liège–Bastogne–Liège
4th Overall Tour of Belgium

1st Stage 3

5th Milan–San Remo
6th Paris–Roubaix
7th Road race, UCI Road World Championships
8th Overall Tour de Suisse
8th Overall Polymultipliée

1st Stage 2 (ITT)

9th Overall Paris–Luxembourg
1969
1st Overall Critérium du Dauphiné Libéré

1st Stages 1a (ITT) & 5a (ITT)

1st Tour du Haut Var
2nd Overall Paris–Nice

1st Stage 1a (ITT)

2nd Grand Prix d'Aix-en-Provence
2nd Grand Prix des Nations
3rd Overall Tour de France
4th Overall Grand Prix du Midi Libre
4th Overall Escalada a Montjuïc
5th Giro di Lombardia
5th Trofeo Laigueglia
7th Overall Tour of the Basque Country

1st Stage 4b (ITT)

7th Overall Four Days of Dunkirk
7th Polymultipliée
8th Genoa–Nice
9th Critérium National de la Route
1970
2nd Overall Setmana Catalana de Ciclisme
2nd Overall A Travers Lausanne
4th Overall Paris–Nice
4th Polymultipliée
6th Genoa–Nice
7th Overall Tour de France
8th Overall Escalada a Montjuïc
8th Liège–Bastogne–Liège
8th Critérium des As
8th Grand Prix des Nations
10th La Flèche Wallonne
1971
1st Overall Étoile des Espoirs

1st Stage 5 (ITT)

1st Overall Setmana Catalana de Ciclisme
1st Critérium National de la Route
2nd Overall Tour of the Basque Country
4th Overall Critérium du Dauphiné Libéré
5th Overall Escalada a Montjuïc
5th GP Union Dortmund
6th Grand Prix des Nations
9th Overall Vuelta a España
1972
1st Overall Paris–Nice

1st Stage 7b (ITT)

1st Critérium National de la Route
1st Critérium des As
2nd Overall Setmana Catalana de Ciclisme

1st Stage 1b (ITT)

2nd La Flèche Wallonne
3rd Overall Tour de France
4th Overall Grand Prix du Midi Libre
4th Grand Prix des Nations
5th Bruxelles–Meulebeke
7th Overall Critérium du Dauphiné Libéré
10th Paris–Roubaix
1973
1st Overall Paris–Nice
1st Overall Grand Prix du Midi Libre
3rd Overall A Travers Lausanne
4th Overall Four Days of Dunkirk
4th Liège–Bastogne–Liège
5th Overall Escalada a Montjuïc
6th Grand Prix de Wallonie
7th Overall Critérium du Dauphiné Libéré
7th Circuit de l'Aulne
9th Grand Prix des Nations
10th Paris–Roubaix
1974
2nd Road race, UCI Road World Championships
2nd Overall Tour de France

1st Stage 16

2nd Overall Critérium du Dauphiné Libéré

1st Mountains classification
1st Stage 6b (ITT)

4th Critérium National de la Route
5th Overall Paris–Nice
5th Overall Tour de Romandie

1st Prologue

5th Grand Prix de Fourmies
6th Critérium des As
1975
2nd Overall Tour du Limousin

1st Stage 3

3rd Paris–Bourges
4th Overall Critérium du Dauphiné Libéré
7th Overall Grand Prix du Midi Libre
7th Overall Tour de l'Oise
8th Grand Prix de Monaco
10th Critérium des As
1976
2nd Paris–Tours
3rd Overall Tour de France
4th Overall Grand Prix du Midi Libre
5th Giro di Lombardia
7th Overall Tour Méditerranéen
7th Grand Prix des Nations
8th Liège–Bastogne–Liège
1977
4th Overall Circuit de la Sarthe
6th Overall Paris–Nice
7th Overall Tour de l'Aude
7th Critérium des As
9th Overall Tour Cycliste du Tarn

=== Grand Tour general classification results timeline ===
Grand Tour	1960	1961	1962	1963	1964	1965	1966	1967	1968	1969	1970	1971	1972	1973	1974	1975	1976	1977
Vuelta a España	—	—	—	—	1	2	—	8	—	—	—	9	—	—	—	—	—	—
Giro d'Italia	Did not contest during his career																	
Tour de France	—	—	3	8	2	2	3	9	DNF	3	7	—	3	DNF	2	19	3	—

=== Monuments results timeline ===
Monument	1960	1961	1962	1963	1964	1965	1966	1967	1968	1969	1970	1971	1972	1973	1974	1975	1976	1977
Milan–San Remo	—	1	—	57	2	41	7	33	5	53	62	—	—	46	—	—	48	—
Tour of Flanders	—	17	—	9	30	32	36	27	14	—	—	67	28	—	27	—	42	—
Paris–Roubaix	19	36	5	6	—	—	DSQ	7	6	—	13	11	10	10	24	—	13	12
Liège–Bastogne–Liège	—	—	—	5	—	—	—	—	3	—	8	—	—	4	—	—	8	—
Giro di Lombardia	96	12	—	13	—	6	3	3	16	5	—	—	15	—	—	—	5	—

=== Major championships results timeline ===
	1960	1961	1962	1963	1964	1965	1966	1967	1968	1969	1970	1971	1972	1973	1974	1975	1976	1977
World Championships	5	3	25	5	3	DNF	3	24	7	56	37	45	33	35	2	17	24	32
National Championships	—	1	—	—	—	2	—	—	—	—	—	—	—	—	—	—	—	

Legend
—	Did not compete
DNF	Did not finish
DSQ	Disqualified

== Bibliography ==
- Belbin, Giles (2017). Chasing the Rainbow: The Story of Road Cycling's World Championships. London: Quarto Publishing. ISBN 978-1-78131-631-3.
- Cossins, Peter (2015). The Monuments: The Grit and the Glory of Cycling's Greatest One-Day Races. London: Bloomsbury. ISBN 978-1-4088-4681-0.
- Fife, Graeme (1999). Tour de France: The History, the Legend, the Riders. Edinburgh: Mainstream Publishing. ISBN 1-84018-284-9.
- Heijmans, Jeroen; Mallon, Bill, eds. (2011). Historical Dictionary of Cycling. Lanham: The Scarecrow Press. ISBN 978-0-8108-7175-5.
- Maso, Benjo (2005). The Sweat of the Gods: Myths and Legends of Bicycle Racing. Norwich: Mousehold Press. ISBN 978-1-874-739-37-1.
