= 1968 Liège–Bastogne–Liège =

Race details
- Dates: 28 April 1968
- Stages: 1
- Distance: 268 km (167 mi)
- Winning time: 7h 22' 00"

Results
	Winner	Valere Van Sweevelt (BEL)	(Smith's)
	Second	Walter Godefroot (BEL)	(Flandria–De Clerck)
	Third	Raymond Poulidor (FRA)	(Mercier–BP–Hutchinson)

The 1968 Liège–Bastogne–Liège was the 54th edition of the Liège–Bastogne–Liège cycle race and was held on 28 April 1968. The race started and finished in Liège. The race was won by Valere Van Sweevelt of the Smith's team.

== General classification ==
Final general classification

Rank	Rider	Team	Time
1	Valere Van Sweevelt (BEL)	Smith's	7h 22' 00"
2	Walter Godefroot (BEL)	Flandria–De Clerck	+ 0"
3	Raymond Poulidor (FRA)	Mercier–BP–Hutchinson	+ 0"
4	Jacques Anquetil (FRA)	Bic	+ 0"
5	Herman Van Springel (BEL)	Dr. Mann–Grundig	+ 0"
6	Wim Schepers (NED)	Caballero–Wielersport	+ 0"
7	Roger Pingeon (FRA)	Peugeot–BP–Michelin	+ 0"
8	Bernard Guyot (FRA)	Pelforth–Sauvage–Lejeune	+ 0"
9	Willy Van Neste (BEL)	Bic	+ 0"
10	Barry Hoban (GBR)	Mercier–BP–Hutchinson	+ 1' 45"
