= Jules Van Der Flaas =

Belgian cyclist

Personal information
- Born: 7 December 1945 (age 80)

Cycling career
- Sport: Cycling
- Role: Rider

Jules Van Der Flaas (born 7 December 1945) is a Belgian racing cyclist. He rode in the 1969 Tour de France.
