= Roger Cooreman =

Belgian cyclist (1941–2026)

Personal information
- Born: 25 June 1941
- Died: 12 October 2026 (aged 85)

Cycling career
- Sport: Cycling
- Role: Rider

Roger Cooreman (25 June 1941 – 12 October 2026) was a Belgian racing cyclist. He rode in the 1969 Tour de France.

== Biography ==
A professional from 1965 to 1971, he distinguished himself mainly in Belgian competitions, having several victories and various places of honor. He also finished second in a stage of the 1970 Critérium du Dauphiné Libéré in 1970, or fourth in Liège-Bastogne-Liège in 1965.

Cooreman died on 12 October 2026, at the age of 85. His daughter Anne-Marie Cooreman also practiced competitive cycling.
