= Lino Carletto =

Italian cyclist (1943–2026)

Personal information
- Born: 20 July 1943 Vigasio, Italy
- Died: 23 May 2026 (aged 83) Isola della Scala, Italy

Cycling career
- Sport: Cycling
- Role: Rider

Lino Carletto (20 July 1943 – 23 May 2026) was an Italian racing cyclist. He rode in the 1969 Tour de France.

Carletto died on 23 May 2026, at the age of 82.
