= 1968 Milan–San Remo =

Race details
- Dates: 19 March 1968
- Stages: 1
- Distance: 288 km (179 mi)
- Winning time: 6h 51' 58"

Results
	Winner	Rudi Altig (FRG)	(Salvarani)
	Second	Charly Grosskost (FRA)	(Bic)
	Third	Adriano Durante (ITA)	(Max Meyer)

The 1968 Milan–San Remo was the 59th edition of the Milan–San Remo cycle race and was held on 19 March 1968. The race started in Milan and finished in San Remo. The race was won by Rudi Altig of the Salvarani team.

== General classification ==
Final general classification

Rank	Rider	Team	Time
1	Rudi Altig (FRG)	Salvarani	6h 51' 58"
2	Charly Grosskost (FRA)	Bic	+ 0"
3	Adriano Durante (ITA)	Max Meyer	+ 0"
4	Edward Sels (BEL)	Bic	+ 0"
5	Raymond Poulidor (FRA)	Mercier–BP–Hutchinson	+ 0"
6	Rolf Maurer (SUI)	Zimba Automatic–Mondia	+ 0"
7	Roberto Ballini (ITA)	Max Meyer	+ 0"
8	Edy Schütz (LUX)	Molteni	+ 11"
9	Walter Godefroot (BEL)	Flandria–De Clerck	+ 11"
10	Rik Van Looy (BEL)	Willem II–Gazelle	+ 15"
