= Ronny Van Sweevelt =

Belgian cyclist (1962–2020)

Personal information
- Born: 3 August 1962 Hasselt, Belgium
- Died: 17 June 2020 (aged 57) Hasselt, Belgium

Cycling career
- Sport: Cycling

Ronny Van Sweevelt (3 August 1962 – 17 June 2020) was a Belgian cyclist. He competed in the individual road race event at the 1984 Summer Olympics.

In later life he became addicted to drugs. He was in the news in 2000 after a police chase in Antwerp, after a suspected drug possession. He was sentenced in 2001.

Van Sweevelt died in Hasselt on 17 June 2020, after being in a coma which was caused by choking during a meal.

Ronny was the younger brother of Valère Van Sweevelt, also a former Belgian racing cyclist who won Liège–Bastogne–Liège in 1968.
