= Pol Mahieu =

Belgian cyclist

Personal information
- Born: 29 July 1944 Ledegem, West Flanders
- Died: 26 March 2022 (aged 77) Roeselare, West Flanders

Cycling career
- Sport: Cycling
- Role: Rider

Pol Mahieu (1944 - 2022) is a Belgian racing cyclist. He rode in the 1969 Tour de France.
