= Eddy Beugels =

Dutch cyclist (1944–2018)

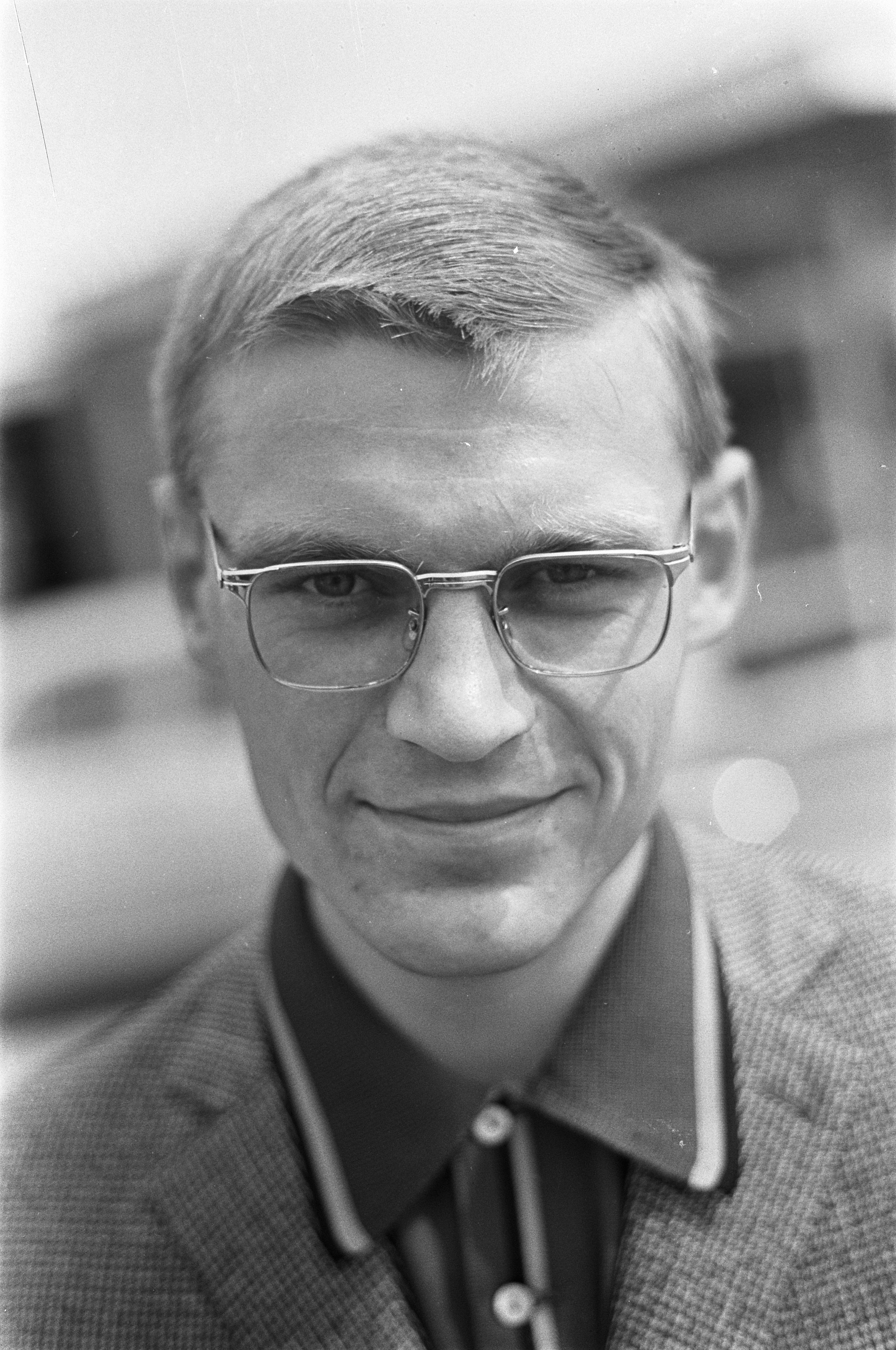
- Eddy Beugels in 1968

Personal information
- Born: 19 March 1944 Schinnen, Netherlands
- Died: 12 January 2018 (aged 73) Maastricht, Netherlands

Sport
- Sport: Cycling
Medal record
Representing the Netherlands
UCI Road World Championships
Silver medal – second place	1966 Nürburgring	Team time trial

Eddy Beugels (19 March 1944 – 12 January 2018) was a Dutch cyclist who won a silver medal in the team time trial at the 1966 UCI Road World Championships. He also won the Ronde van Noord-Holland (1966), Grand Prix de Wallonie (1968), Eschborn-Frankfurt City Loop, and one stage of the Olympia's Tour (1965). During his career that spanned seven years between 1964 and 1970 he competed three times in the Tour de France, in 1968, 1969 and 1970.
