= List of teams and cyclists in the 1950 Giro d'Italia =

The 1950 Giro d'Italia was the 33rd edition of the Giro d'Italia, one of cycling's Grand Tours. The three-week 3,981-kilometre (2,474 mi) race of 18 stages with two rest days, started in Milan on 24 May and finished at the Rome on 13 June.

== Teams ==
Majority of Italian cyclists

- Arbos (riders)
- Atala (riders)
- Bartali (riders)
- Benotto (riders)
- Bianchi–Ursus (riders)
- Bottecchia (riders)
- Cimatti (riders)
- Fréjus–Superga (riders)
- Ganna–Superga (riders)
- Legnano–Pirelli (riders)
- Taurea (riders)
- Viscontea (riders)
- Wilier Triestina (riders)

Majority of French cyclists

- Helyett–Hutchinson (riders)

Majority of Swiss cyclists

- Guerra–Ursus (riders)

== Cyclists ==
Legend
No.	Starting number worn by the rider during the Giro
Pos.	Position in the general classification
Time	Deficit to the winner of the general classification
*	Denotes the winner of the general classification
‡	Denotes the winner of the mountains classification
DNS	Denotes a rider who did not start a stage, followed by the stage before which he withdrew
DNF	Denotes a rider who did not finish a stage, followed by the stage in which he withdrew
HD	Denotes a rider who finished outside the time limit, followed by the stage in which he did so
Age correct as of 24 May 1950, the date on which the Giro began

=== By starting number ===
No.	Name	Nationality	Team	Age	Pos.	Time	Refs
1	Fausto Coppi	Italy	Bianchi–Ursus	30	DNF-9	—	
2	Désiré Keteleer	Belgium	Bianchi–Ursus	29	43	+ 1h 46' 29"	
3	Oreste Conte	Italy	Bianchi–Ursus	30	66	+ 3h 08' 02"	
4	Serse Coppi	Italy	Bianchi–Ursus	27	60	+ 2h 57' 32"	
5	Andrea Carrea	Italy	Bianchi–Ursus	25	69	+ 3h 21' 34"	
6	Ettore Milano	Italy	Bianchi–Ursus	24	51	+ 2h 16' 50"	
7	Fiorenzo Crippa	Italy	Bianchi–Ursus	24	54	+ 2h 26' 23"	
8	Gino Bartali	Italy	Bartali	35	2	+ 5' 12"	
9	Mario Gestri	Italy	Bartali	26	75	+ 5h 00' 04"	
10	Giovanni Corrieri	Italy	Bartali	28	67	+ 3h 19' 33"	
11	Mario Baroni	Italy	Bartali	23	35	+ 1h 28' 56"	
12	Attilio Lambertini	Italy	Bartali	29	63	+ 3h 07' 11"	
13	Angelo Brignole	Italy	Bartali	26	64	+ 3h 07' 53"	
14	Bruno Giannelli	Italy	Bartali	24	59	+ 2h 56' 16"	
15	Fiorenzo Magni	Italy	Wilier Triestina	29	6	+ 12' 14"	
16	Antonio Bevilacqua	Italy	Wilier Triestina	31	29	+ 1h 19' 54"	
17	Egidio Feruglio	Italy	Wilier Triestina	29	61	+ 3h 01' 08"	
18	Adolfo Grosso	Italy	Wilier Triestina	22	62	+ 3h 05' 58"	
19	Selvino Selvatico	Italy	Wilier Triestina	25	DNF-9	—	
20	Giuseppe Molinari	Italy	Wilier Triestina	27	DNF-9	—	
21	Giuseppe Ausenda	Italy	Wilier Triestina	31	DNF-17	—	
22	Adolfo Leoni	Italy	Legnano–Pirelli	33	DNF-16	—	
23	Pasquale Fornara	Italy	Legnano–Pirelli	25	12	+ 24' 52"	
24	Virgilio Salimbeni	Italy	Legnano–Pirelli	27	23	+ 55' 01"	
25	Renzo Soldani	Italy	Legnano–Pirelli	25	32	+ 1h 23' 38"	
26	Luciano Frosini	Italy	Legnano–Pirelli	22	DNF-3	—	
27	Giuseppe Minardi	Italy	Legnano–Pirelli	22	55	+ 2h 31' 15"	
28	Giorgio Albani	Italy	Legnano–Pirelli	20	47	+ 2h 02' 36"	
29	Luciano Maggini	Italy	Taurea	24	5	+ 10' 49"	
30	Alfredo Martini	Italy	Taurea	29	3	+ 8' 41"	
31	Giancarlo Astrua	Italy	Taurea	22	25	+ 59' 54"	
32	Vittorio Rossello	Italy	Taurea	24	24	+ 58' 57"	
33	Vincenzo Rossello	Italy	Taurea	27	27	+ 1h 08' 07"	
34	Franco Franchi	Italy	Taurea	26	22	+ 52' 17"	
35	Ugo Fondelli	Italy	Taurea	30	50	+ 2h 07' 17"	
36	Vito Ortelli	Italy	Atala	28	DNF-3	—	
37	Luigi Casola	Italy	Atala	28	70	+ 3h 26' 29"	
38	Luciano Pezzi	Italy	Atala	29	8	+ 14' 34"	
39	Guido De Santi	Italy	Atala	27	40	+ 1h 43' 10"	
40	Armando Peverelli	Italy	Atala	28	37	+ 1h 35' 03"	
41	Valeriano Zanazzi	Italy	Atala	23	68	+ 3h 19' 48"	
42	Widner Servadei	Italy	Atala	23	57	+ 2h 34' 40"	
43	Nedo Logli	Italy	Ganna–Superga	26	DNF-9	—	
44	Aldo Bini	Italy	Ganna–Superga	34	DNF-14	—	
45	Angelo Fumagalli	Italy	Ganna–Superga	26	36	+ 1h 33' 24"	
46	Vittorio Seghezzi	Italy	Ganna–Superga	25	DNF-16	—	
47	Donato Zampini	Italy	Ganna–Superga	23	14	+ 26' 36"	
48	Giovanni Meazzo	Italy	Ganna–Superga	21	DNF-14	—	
49	Luciano Chiti	Italy	Ganna–Superga	21	DNF-15	—	
50	Ferdinand Kübler	Switzerland	Fréjus–Superga	30	4	+ 8' 45"	
51	Jean Goldschmit	Luxembourg	Fréjus–Superga	26	41	+ 1h 43' 17"	
52	Silvio Pedroni	Italy	Fréjus–Superga	32	7	+ 13' 07"	
53	Franco Fanti	Italy	Fréjus–Superga	26	56	+ 2h 32' 50"	
54	Giuseppe Doni	Italy	Fréjus–Superga	20	58	+ 2h 47' 32"	
55	Armando Barducci	Italy	Fréjus–Superga	24	16	+ 29' 34"	
56	Antonio Covolo	Italy	Fréjus–Superga	30	71	+ 3h 37' 31"	
57	Giulio Bresci	Italy	Bottecchia	28	9	+ 18' 08"	
58	Alfredo Pasotti	Italy	Bottecchia	25	21	+ 43' 50"	
59	Serafino Biagioni	Italy	Bottecchia	30	DNF-14	—	
60	Giacomo Zampieri	Italy	Bottecchia	24	19	+ 34' 38"	
61	Dino Ottusi	Italy	Bottecchia	22	45	+ 1h 57' 14"	
62	Mario Fazio	Italy	Bottecchia	30	48	+ 2h 05' 54"	
63	Marcello Paolieri	Italy	Bottecchia	24	73	+ 4h 05' 07"	
64	Jean Robic	France	Viscontea	28	DNF-13	—	
65	André Brule	France	Viscontea	28	33	+ 1h 25' 54"	
66	Claudio Ricci	Italy	Viscontea	24	DNF-10	—	
67	Primo Volpi	Italy	Viscontea	34	38	+ 1h 36' 48"	
68	Mario Vicini	Italy	Viscontea	37	18	+ 34' 28"	
69	Nello Sforacchi	Italy	Viscontea	21	39	+ 1h 40' 51"	
70	Dante Rivola	Italy	Viscontea	23	DNF-13	—	
71	Danilo Barozzi	Italy	Cimatti	22	DNF-13	—	
72	Dino Rossi	Italy	Cimatti	29	31	+ 1h 23' 37"	
73	Ezio Cecchi	Italy	Cimatti	37	17	+ 34' 03"	
74	Pietro Giudici	Italy	Cimatti	28	10	+ 20' 05"	
75	Oliviero Tonini	Italy	Cimatti	28	65	+ 3h 07' 53"	
76	Guido Cavalli	Italy	Cimatti	24	DNF-12	—	
77	Bruno Pasquini	Italy	Cimatti	25	20	+ 37' 37"	
78	Apo Lazaridès	France	Helyett–Hutchinson	24	34	+ 1h 27' 50"	
79	Lucien Teisseire	France	Helyett–Hutchinson	30	DNF-13	—	
80	Lucien Lazaridès	France	Helyett–Hutchinson	27	DNF-6	—	
81	Pierre Cogan	France	Helyett–Hutchinson	36	DNF-11	—	
82	Nello Lauredi	France	Helyett–Hutchinson	25	15	+ 26' 39"	
83	Emile Teisseire	France	Helyett–Hutchinson	26	DNF-9	—	
84	José Beyaert	France	Helyett–Hutchinson	24	72	+ 4h 00' 12"	
85	Fritz Schär	Switzerland	Arbos	24	11	+23' 53"	
86	Renzo Zanazzi	Italy	Arbos	26	49	+ 2h 06' 37"	
87	Bruno Pontisso	Italy	Arbos	24	DNF-9	—	
88	Livio Isotti	Italy	Arbos	22	DNF-8	—	
89	Leo Castellucci	Italy	Arbos	22	30	+ 1h 20' 19"	
90	Sergio Pagliazzi	Italy	Arbos	23	28	+ 1h 15' 49"	
91	Enzo Coppini	Italy	Arbos	30	DNF-10	—	
92	Aldo Ronconi	Italy	Benotto	31	13	+ 24' 55"	
93	Umberto Drei	Italy	Benotto	25	DNF-9	—	
94	Aldo Tosi	Italy	Benotto	26	DNF-15	—	
95	Valerio Bonini	Italy	Benotto	25	26	+ 1h 07' 21"	
96	Giorgio Cargioli	Italy	Benotto	21	DNF-13	—	
97	Annibale Brasola	Italy	Benotto	24	52	+ 2h 20' 42"	
98	Alberto Ghirardi	Italy	Benotto	40	44	+ 1h 55' 18"	
99	Marcel Dupont	Belgium	Guerra–Ursus	32	DNF-13	—	
100	Olimpio Bizzi	Italy	Guerra–Ursus	33	53	+ 2h 23' 31"	
101	Hugo Koblet*‡	Switzerland	Guerra–Ursus	25	1	117h 28' 03"	
102	Gottfried Weilenmann	Switzerland	Guerra–Ursus	30	46	+ 1h 58' 22"	
103	Pino Cerami	Italy	Guerra–Ursus	28	DNF-3	—	
104	Leo Weilenmann	Switzerland	Guerra–Ursus	27	74	+ 4h 32' 23"	
105	Fausto Marini	Italy	Guerra–Ursus	26	42	+ 1h 45' 02"	

=== By team ===
Bianchi–Ursus
No.	Rider	Pos.
1	Fausto Coppi (ITA)	DNF-9
2	Désiré Keteleer (BEL)	43
3	Oreste Conte (ITA)	66
4	Serse Coppi (ITA)	60
5	Andrea Carrea (ITA)	69
6	Ettore Milano (ITA)	38
7	Fiorenzo Crippa (ITA)	54

Bartali
No.	Rider	Pos.
8	Gino Bartali (ITA)	2
9	Mario Gestri (ITA)	75
10	Giovanni Corrieri (ITA)	67
11	Mario Baroni (ITA)	35
12	Attilio Lambertini (ITA)	63
13	Angelo Brignole (ITA)	64
14	Bruno Giannelli (ITA)	59

Wilier Triestina
No.	Rider	Pos.
15	Fiorenzo Magni (ITA)	6
16	Antonio Bevilacqua (ITA)	29
17	Egidio Feruglio (ITA)	61
18	Adolfo Grosso (ITA)	62
19	Selvino Selvatico (ITA)	DNF-9
20	Giuseppe Molinari (ITA)	DNF-9
21	Giuseppe Ausenda (ITA)	DNF-17

Legnano–Pirelli
No.	Rider	Pos.
22	Adolfo Leoni (ITA)	DNF-16
23	Pasquale Fornara (ITA)	12
24	Virgilio Salimbeni (ITA)	23
25	Renzo Soldani (ITA)	32
26	Luciano Frosini (ITA)	DNF-3
27	Giuseppe Minardi (ITA)	55
28	Giorgio Albani (ITA)	47

Taurea
No.	Rider	Pos.
29	Luciano Maggini (ITA)	5
30	Alfredo Martini (ITA)	3
31	Giancarlo Astrua (ITA)	25
32	Vittorio Rossello (ITA)	24
33	Vincenzo Rossello (ITA)	27
34	Franco Franchi (ITA)	22
35	Ugo Fondelli (ITA)	50

Atala
No.	Rider	Pos.
36	Vito Ortelli (ITA)	DNF-3
37	Luigi Casola (ITA)	70
38	Luciano Pezzi (ITA)	8
39	Guido De Santi (ITA)	40
40	Armando Peverelli (ITA)	37
41	Valeriano Zanazzi (ITA)	68
42	Widner Servadei (ITA)	57

Ganna–Superga
No.	Rider	Pos.
43	Nedo Logli (ITA)	DNF-9
44	Aldo Bini (ITA)	DNF-14
45	Angelo Fumagalli (ITA)	36
46	Vittorio Seghezzi (ITA)	DNF-16
47	Donato Zampini (ITA)	14
48	Giovanni Meazzo (ITA)	DNF-14
49	Luciano Chiti (ITA)	DNF-15

Fréjus–Superga
No.	Rider	Pos.
50	Ferdinand Kübler (SUI)	4
51	Jean Goldschmit (LUX)	41
52	Silvio Pedroni (ITA)	7
53	Franco Fanti (ITA)	56
54	Giuseppe Doni (ITA)	58
55	Armando Barducci (ITA)	16
56	Antonio Covolo (ITA)	71

Bottecchia
No.	Rider	Pos.
57	Giulio Bresci (ITA)	9
58	Alfredo Pasotti (ITA)	21
59	Serafino Biagioni (ITA)	DNF-14
60	Giacomo Zampieri (ITA)	19
61	Dino Ottusi (ITA)	45
62	Mario Fazio (ITA)	48
63	Marcello Paolieri (ITA)	73

Viscontea
No.	Rider	Pos.
64	Jean Robic (FRA)	DNF-13
65	André Brulé (FRA)	33
66	Claudio Ricci (ITA)	DNF-10
67	Primo Volpi (ITA)	38
68	Mario Vicini (ITA)	18
69	Nello Sforacchi (FRA)	39
70	Dante Rivola (ITA)	DNF-13

Cimatti
No.	Rider	Pos.
71	Danilo Barozzi (ITA)	DNF-13
72	Dino Rossi (ITA)	31
73	Ezio Cecchi (ITA)	17
74	Pietro Giudici (ITA)	10
75	Oliviero Tonini (ITA)	65
76	Guido Cavalli (ITA)	DNF-12
77	Bruno Pasquini (ITA)	20

Helyett–Hutchinson
No.	Rider	Pos.
78	Apo Lazaridès (FRA)	34
79	Lucien Teisseire (FRA)	DNF-13
80	Lucien Lazaridès (FRA)	DNF-6
81	Pierre Cogan (FRA)	DNF-11
82	Nello Lauredi (ITA)	15
83	Emile Teisseire (FRA)	DNF-9
84	José Beyaert (FRA)	72

Arbos
No.	Rider	Pos.
85	Fritz Schär (SUI)	11
86	Renzo Zanazzi (ITA)	49
87	Bruno Pontisso (ITA)	DNF-9
88	Livio Isotti (ITA)	DNF-8
89	Leo Castellucci (ITA)	30
90	Sergio Pagliazzi (ITA)	28
91	Enzo Coppini (ITA)	DNF-10

Benotto
No.	Rider	Pos.
92	Aldo Ronconi (ITA)	13
93	Umberto Drei (ITA)	DNF-9
94	Aldo Tosi (ITA)	DNF-15
95	Valerio Bonini (ITA)	26
96	Giorgio Cargioli (ITA)	DNF-13
97	Annibale Brasola (ITA)	52
98	Alberto Ghirardi (ITA)	44

Guerra–Ursus
No.	Rider	Pos.
99	Marcel Dupont (BEL)	DNF-13
100	Olimpio Bizzi (ITA)	53
101	Hugo Koblet (SUI)*‡	1
102	Gottfried Weilenmann (SUI)	46
103	Pino Cerami (ITA)	DNF-3
104	Leo Weilenmann (SUI)	74
105	Fausto Marini (ITA)	42

=== By nationality ===
Country	No. of riders	Finishers	Stage wins
Belgium	2	1	
France	9	4	
Italy	88	64	15 (Adolfo Leoni, Alfredo Martini, Annibale Brasola, Antonio Bevilacqua x2, Fiorenzo Magni, Franco Franchi, Giancarlo Astrua, Gino Bartali, Luciano Maggini x2, Mario Fazio, Olimpio Bizzi, Oreste Conte x2)
Luxembourg	1	1	
Switzerland	5	5	3 (Fritz Schär, Hugo Koblet x2)
Total	105	75	18
