= List of teams and cyclists in the 1951 Giro d'Italia =

The 1951 Giro d'Italia was the 34th edition of the Giro d'Italia, one of cycling's Grand Tours. The field consisted of 98 riders, and 75 riders finished the race.

== By rider ==
Legend
No.	Starting number worn by the rider during the Giro
Pos.	Position in the general classification
DNF	Denotes a rider who did not finish

No.	Name	Nationality	Team	Ref
1	Fiorenzo Magni	Italy	Ganna–Ursus	
2	Nedo Logli	Italy	Ganna–Ursus	
3	Donato Zampini	Italy	Ganna–Ursus	
4	Aldo Bini	Italy	Ganna–Ursus	
5	Franco Franchi	Italy	Ganna–Ursus	
6	Franco Fanti	Italy	Ganna–Ursus	
7	Serafino Biagioni	Italy	Ganna–Ursus	
8	Antonio Bevilacqua	Italy	Benotto	
9	Guido De Santi	Italy	Benotto	
10	Umberto Drei	Italy	Benotto	
11	Valerio Bonini	Italy	Benotto	
12	Dante Rivola	Italy	Benotto	
13	Bartolo Bof	Italy	Benotto	
14	Giovanni Pettinati	Italy	Benotto	
15	Fausto Coppi	Italy	Bianchi–Pirelli	
16	Serse Coppi	Italy	Bianchi–Pirelli	
17	Désiré Keteleer	Belgium	Bianchi–Pirelli	
18	Andrea Carrea	Italy	Bianchi–Pirelli	
19	Fiorenzo Crippa	Italy	Bianchi–Pirelli	
20	Ettore Milano	Italy	Bianchi–Pirelli	
21	Oreste Conte	Italy	Bianchi–Pirelli	
22	Ferdi Kubler	Switzerland	Fréjus–Ursus	
23	Emilio Croci-Torti	Switzerland	Fréjus–Ursus	
24	Silvio Pedroni	Italy	Fréjus–Ursus	
25	Armando Barducci	Italy	Fréjus–Ursus	
26	Marcello Ciolli	Italy	Fréjus–Ursus	
27	Luigi Spotti	Italy	Fréjus–Ursus	
28	Bruno Pasquini	Italy	Fréjus–Ursus	
29	Fritz Schär	Switzerland	Arbos	
30	Renzo Zanazzi	Italy	Arbos	
31	Livio Isotti	Italy	Arbos	
32	Bruno Pontisso	Italy	Arbos	
33	Giacomo Zampieri	Italy	Arbos	
34	Luciano Frosini	Italy	Arbos	
35	Ersilio Dordoni	Italy	Arbos	
36	Louison Bobet	France	Bottecchia	
37	Édouard Muller	France	Bottecchia	
38	Giulio Bresci	Italy	Bottecchia	
39	Mario Fazio	Italy	Bottecchia	
40	Giovanni Roma	Italy	Bottecchia	
41	Giovanni Pinarello	Italy	Bottecchia	
42	Vittorio Seghezzi	Italy	Bottecchia	
43	Alfredo Martini	Italy	Taurea	
44	Loretto Petrucci	Italy	Taurea	
45	Giancarlo Astrua	Italy	Taurea	
46	Vincenzo Rossello	Italy	Taurea	
47	Vittorio Rossello	Italy	Taurea	
48	Mario Baroni	Italy	Taurea	
49	Orfeo Ponsin	Italy	Taurea	
50	Erminio Leoni	Italy	Legnano–Pirelli	
51	Renzo Soldani	Italy	Legnano–Pirelli	
52	Pasquale Fornara	Italy	Legnano–Pirelli	
53	Virgilio Salimbeni	Italy	Legnano–Pirelli	
54	Giorgio Albani	Italy	Legnano–Pirelli	
55	Giuseppe Minardi	Italy	Legnano–Pirelli	
56	Tranquillo Scudellaro	Italy	Legnano–Pirelli	
57	Luciano Maggini	Italy	Atala	
58	Luigi Casola	Italy	Atala	
59	Luciano Pezzi	Italy	Atala	
60	Danilo Barozzi	Italy	Atala	
61	Arigo Padovan	Italy	Atala	
62	Waldemaro Bartolozzi	Italy	Atala	
63	Édouard Fachleitner	France	Atala	
64	Gino Bartali	Italy	Bartali	
65	Giovanni Corrieri	Italy	Bartali	
66	Attilio Lambertini	Italy	Bartali	
67	Bruno Giannelli	Italy	Bartali	
68	Mario Gestri	Italy	Bartali	
69	Remo Sabatini	Italy	Bartali	
70	Jacques Dupont	France	Bartali	
71	Jacques Marinelli	France	Stucchi–Ursus	
72	Pietro Giudici	Italy	Stucchi–Ursus	
73	Ugo Fondelli	Italy	Stucchi–Ursus	
74	Lido Sartini	Italy	Stucchi–Ursus	
75	Sergio Vitali	Italy	Stucchi–Ursus	
76	Angelo Menon	Italy	Stucchi–Ursus	
77	Cesare Olmi	Italy	Stucchi–Ursus	
78	Hugo Koblet	Switzerland	Guerra–Ursus	
79	Martin Metzger	Switzerland	Guerra–Ursus	
80	Olimpio Bizzi	Italy	Guerra–Ursus	
81	Dino Rossi	Italy	Guerra–Ursus	
82	Elio Bertocchi	Italy	Guerra–Ursus	
83	Renato Barbiero	Italy	Guerra–Ursus	
84	Rodolfo Falzoni	Italy	Guerra–Ursus	
85	Alfredo Pasotti	Italy	Wilier Triestina	
86	Rinaldo Moresco	Italy	Wilier Triestina	
87	Adolfo Grosso	Italy	Wilier Triestina	
88	Luciano Cremonese	Italy	Wilier Triestina	
89	Annibale Brasola	Italy	Wilier Triestina	
90	Elio Brasola	Italy	Wilier Triestina	
91	Pietro Zappon	Italy	Wilier Triestina	
92	Briek Schotte	Belgium	Girardengo	
93	Rik Van Steenbergen	Belgium	Girardengo	
94	Raymond Impanis	Belgium	Girardengo	
95	Marcel Kint	Belgium	Girardengo	
96	Marcel Hendrickx	Belgium	Girardengo	
97	Prosper Depredomme	Belgium	Girardengo	
98	Franco Giacchero	Italy	Girardengo	
