= List of teams and cyclists in the 1949 Giro d'Italia =

The 1949 Giro d'Italia was the 32nd edition of the Giro d'Italia, one of cycling's Grand Tours. The field consisted of 102 riders, and 65 riders finished the race.

== By rider ==
Legend
No.	Starting number worn by the rider during the Giro
Pos.	Position in the general classification
DNF	Denotes a rider who did not finish

No.	Name	Nationality	Team	Ref
1	Luigi Maggini	Italy	Wilier Triestina	
2	Giordano Cottur	Italy	Wilier Triestina	
3	Giulio Bresci	Italy	Wilier Triestina	
4	Alfredo Martini	Italy	Wilier Triestina	
5	Egidio Feruglio	Italy	Wilier Triestina	
6	Antonio Ausenda	Italy	Wilier Triestina	
7	Sante Carollo	Italy	Wilier Triestina	
8	Sergio Maggini	Italy	Atala	
9	Antonio Bevilacqua	Italy	Atala	
10	Guido De Santi	Italy	Atala	
11	Armando Peverelli	Italy	Atala	
12	Luciano Pezzi	Italy	Atala	
13	Bartolo Bof	Italy	Atala	
14	Angelo Fumagalli	Italy	Atala	
15	Adolfo Leoni	Italy	Legnano–Pirelli	
16	Dino Ottusi	Italy	Legnano–Pirelli	
17	Vincenzo Rossello	Italy	Legnano–Pirelli	
18	Vittorio Rossello	Italy	Legnano–Pirelli	
19	Renzo Soldani	Italy	Legnano–Pirelli	
20	Pasquale Fornara	Italy	Legnano–Pirelli	
21	Luciano Frosini	Italy	Legnano–Pirelli	
22	Pino Cerami	Belgium	Ganna–Ursus	
23	Albert Dubuisson	Belgium	Ganna–Ursus	
24	Jean Lesage	Belgium	Ganna–Ursus	
25	Roger Missine	Belgium	Ganna–Ursus	
26	Marcel Buysse	Belgium	Ganna–Ursus	
27	Jozef Van Der Helst	Belgium	Ganna–Ursus	
28	Joseph Van Staeyen	Belgium	Ganna–Ursus	
29	Gino Bartali	Italy	Bartali	
31	Noël Benso	Italy	Bartali	
32	Georges Jomaux	Belgium	Bartali	
33	Giovanni Corrieri	Italy	Bartali	
34	Angelo Brignole	Italy	Bartali	
35	Enzo Bellini	Italy	Bartali	
36	Fausto Coppi	Italy	Bianchi–Ursus	
37	Oreste Conte	Italy	Bianchi–Ursus	
38	Serse Coppi	Italy	Bianchi–Ursus	
39	Bruno Pasquini	Italy	Bianchi–Ursus	
40	Andrea Carrea	Italy	Bianchi–Ursus	
41	Ettore Milano	Italy	Bianchi–Ursus	
42	Fiorenzo Crippa	Italy	Bianchi–Ursus	
43	Silvio Pedroni	Italy	Fréjus–Pirelli	
44	Settimio Simonini	Italy	Fréjus–Pirelli	
45	Giuseppe Doni	Italy	Fréjus–Pirelli	
46	Armando Barducci	Italy	Fréjus–Pirelli	
47	Franco Franchi	Italy	Fréjus–Pirelli	
48	Franco Fanti	Italy	Fréjus–Pirelli	
49	Rino Burchi	Italy	Fréjus–Pirelli	
50	Ezio Cecchi	Italy	Cimatti	
51	Danilo Barozzi	Italy	Cimatti	
52	Dino Rossi	Italy	Cimatti	
53	Oliviero Tonini	Italy	Cimatti	
55	Alighiero Ridolfi	Italy	Cimatti	
56	Freido Pasquetti	Italy	Cimatti	
57	Aldo Ronconi	Italy	Viscontea	
58	Mario Ricci	Italy	Viscontea	
59	Ugo Fondelli	Italy	Viscontea	
60	Sarafino Biagioni	Italy	Viscontea	
61	Attilio Lambertini	Italy	Viscontea	
62	Mario Vicini	Italy	Viscontea	
63	Glauco Servadei	Italy	Viscontea	
64	Nedo Logli	Italy	Arbos	
65	Primo Volpi	Italy	Arbos	
66	Leo Castellucci	Italy	Arbos	
67	Marcello Paolieri	Italy	Arbos	
68	Vitaliano Lazzerini	Italy	Arbos	
69	Bruno Pontisso	Italy	Arbos	
70	Valeriano Zanazzi	Italy	Arbos	
71	Olimpio Bizzi	Italy	Edelweiss	
72	Aldo Baito	Italy	Edelweiss	
73	Pietro Fulcheri	Italy	Edelweiss	
74	Aldo Tosi	Italy	Edelweiss	
75	Vittorio Seghezzi	Italy	Edelweiss	
77	Elio Busancano	Italy	Edelweiss	
78	Fritz Schär	Switzerland	Stucchi	
79	Pietro Tarchini	Switzerland	Stucchi	
80	Emilio Croci-Torti	Switzerland	Stucchi	
81	Luigi Malabrocca	Italy	Stucchi	
82	Giovanni Mattavelli	Italy	Stucchi	
83	Giovanni Pinarello	Italy	Stucchi	
84	Fernandino Della Giustina	Italy	Stucchi	
85	Luigi Casola	Italy	Benotto	
86	Alfredo Pasotti	Italy	Benotto	
87	Giorgio Cargioli	Italy	Benotto	
88	Alberto Ghirardi	Italy	Benotto	
89	Umberto Drei	Italy	Benotto	
90	Giancarlo Astrua	Italy	Benotto	
91	Valerio Bonini	Italy	Benotto	
92	Jean Goldschmit	Luxembourg	Fiorelli	
93	Jakob Schenk	Switzerland	Fiorelli	
94	Rudi Valenta	Italy	Fiorelli	
95	Egidio Marangoni	Italy	Fiorelli	
96	Gildo Monari	Italy	Fiorelli	
97	Primo Zuccotti	Italy	Fiorelli	
98	Enzo Nannini	Italy	Fiorelli	
99	Mario Fazio	Italy	Bottecchia	
100	Adriano Lugatti	Italy	Bottecchia	
101	Vittorio Magni	Italy	Bottecchia	
102	Enzo Coppini	Italy	Bottecchia	
103	Annibale Brasola	Italy	Bottecchia	
104	Selvino Selvatico	Italy	Bottecchia	
105	Alfio Fazio	Italy	Bottecchia	
