= List of teams and cyclists in the 1948 Giro d'Italia =

The 1948 Giro d'Italia was the 31st edition of the Giro d'Italia, one of cycling's Grand Tours. The field consisted of 77 riders, and 41 riders finished the race.

== By rider ==
Legend
No.	Starting number worn by the rider during the Giro
Pos.	Position in the general classification
DNF	Denotes a rider who did not finish

No.	Name	Nationality	Team	Ref
1	Gino Bartali	Italy	Legnano–Pirelli	
2	Adolfo Leoni	Italy	Legnano–Pirelli	
3	Mario Ricci	Italy	Legnano–Pirelli	
4	Giovanni Corrieri	Italy	Legnano–Pirelli	
5	Vincenzo Rossello	Italy	Legnano–Pirelli	
6	Virgilio Salimbeni	Italy	Legnano–Pirelli	
7	Leo Castellucci	Italy	Legnano–Pirelli	
8	Albert Ritservelde	Belgium	Lygie	
9	Jérôme Dufromont	Belgium	Lygie	
10	Frans Gielen	Belgium	Lygie	
11	Karel Leysen	Belgium	Lygie	
12	Hilaire Couvreur	Belgium	Lygie	
13	Eugène Cappelmans	Belgium	Lygie	
14	Albert Daenekint	Belgium	Lygie	
15	Émile Idée	France	Peugeot–Dunlop	
16	Camille Danguillaume	France	Peugeot–Dunlop	
17	Maurice De Muer	Belgium	Peugeot–Dunlop	
18	Alphonse De Vreese	Belgium	Peugeot–Dunlop	
19	Paul Giguet	France	Peugeot–Dunlop	
20	Jean de Gribaldy	France	Peugeot–Dunlop	
21	Robert Dorgebray	France	Peugeot–Dunlop	
22	Fiorenzo Magni	Italy	Wilier Triestina	
23	Giordano Cottur	Italy	Wilier Triestina	
24	Luciano Maggini	Italy	Wilier Triestina	
25	Giulio Bresci	Italy	Wilier Triestina	
26	Alfredo Martini	Italy	Wilier Triestina	
27	Egidio Feruglio	Italy	Wilier Triestina	
28	Guido De Santi	Italy	Wilier Triestina	
29	Egidio Marangoni	Italy	Viani–Cral	
30	Vittorio Rossello	Italy	Viani–Cral	
31	Serafino Biagioni	Italy	Viani–Cral	
32	Vittorio Magni	Italy	Viani–Cral	
33	Antonio Usenda	Italy	Viani–Cral	
34	Settimio Simonini	Italy	Viani–Cral	
35	Amedo Maricanola	Italy	Viani–Cral	
36	Renzo Zanazzi	Italy	Cimatti	
37	Valeriano Zanazzi	Italy	Cimatti	
38	Gikdo Monari	Italy	Cimatti	
39	Ezio Cecchi	Italy	Cimatti	
40	Luigi Casola	Italy	Cimatti	
41	Enzo Bellini	Italy	Cimatti	
42	Carlo Moscardini	Italy	Cimatti	
43	Vito Ortelli	Italy	Atala	
44	Antonio Bevilacqua	Italy	Atala	
45	Italo De Zan	Italy	Atala	
46	Elio Bertocchi	Italy	Atala	
47	Sergio Pagliazzi	Italy	Atala	
48	Armando Peverelli	Italy	Atala	
49	Bartolo Bof	Italy	Atala	
50	Angelo Brignole	Italy	Arbos	
51	Nedo Logli	Italy	Arbos	
52	Primo Volpi	Italy	Arbos	
53	Luciano Pezzi	Italy	Arbos	
54	Attilio Lambertini	Italy	Arbos	
55	Vitaliano Lazzerini	Italy	Arbos	
56	Marcello Paolieri	Italy	Arbos	
57	Aldo Bini	Italy	Benotto	
58	Antonio Covolo	Italy	Benotto	
59	Angelo Menon	Italy	Benotto	
60	Umberto Drei	Italy	Benotto	
61	Alfredo Pasotti	Italy	Benotto	
62	Giorgio Cargioli	Italy	Benotto	
63	Giancarlo Astrua	Italy	Benotto	
64	Fausto Coppi	Italy	Bianchi	
65	Aldo Ronconi	Italy	Bianchi	
66	Oreste Conte	Italy	Bianchi	
67	Bruno Pasquini	Italy	Bianchi	
68	Mario Vicini	Italy	Bianchi	
69	Désiré Keteleer	Belgium	Bianchi	
70	Prosper Depredomme	Belgium	Bianchi	
71	Olimpio Bizzi	Italy	Viscontea	
72	Aldo Baito	Italy	Viscontea	
73	Quirino Toccaceli	Italy	Viscontea	
74	Severino Canavesi	Italy	Viscontea	
75	Giovanni Ronco	Italy	Viscontea	
76	Ubaldo Pugnaloni	Italy	Viscontea	
77	Ugo Fondelli	Italy	Viscontea	
