= List of teams and cyclists in the 1946 Giro d'Italia =

The 1946 Giro d'Italia was the 29th edition of the Giro d'Italia, one of cycling's Grand Tours. The field consisted of 79 riders, and 40 riders finished the race.

== By rider ==
Legend
No.	Starting number worn by the rider during the Giro
Pos.	Position in the general classification
DNF	Denotes a rider who did not finish

No.	Name	Nationality	Team	Ref
1	Gino Bartali	Italy	Legnano–Pirelli	
2	Mario Ricci	Italy	Legnano–Pirelli	
3	Aldo Bini	Italy	Legnano–Pirelli	
4	Angelo Brignole	Italy	Legnano–Pirelli	
5	Leopoldo Ricci	Italy	Legnano–Pirelli	
6	Renzo Zanazzi	Italy	Legnano–Pirelli	
7	Valeriano Zanazzi	Italy	Legnano–Pirelli	
8	Adolfo Leoni	Italy	Bianchi	
9	Fausto Coppi	Italy	Bianchi	
10	Glauco Servadei	Italy	Bianchi	
11	Severino Canavesi	Italy	Bianchi	
12	Giovanni De Stefanis	Italy	Bianchi	
13	Secondo Barisone	Italy	Bianchi	
14	Serse Coppi	Italy	Bianchi	
15	Olimpio Bizzi	Italy	Viscontea	
16	Mario Vicini	Italy	Viscontea	
17	Pietro Chiappini	Italy	Viscontea	
18	Elio Bertocchi	Italy	Viscontea	
19	Mario Fazio	Italy	Viscontea	
20	Tolmino Casellato	Italy	Viscontea	
21	Giovanni Corrieri	Italy	Viscontea	
22	Vito Ortelli	Italy	Benotto	
23	Oreste Conte	Italy	Benotto	
24	Aldo Ronconi	Italy	Benotto	
25	Enrico Mollo	Italy	Benotto	
26	Enea Antolini	Italy	Benotto	
27	Guido Lelli	Italy	Benotto	
28	Sergio Maggini	Italy	Benotto	
29	Fermo Camellini	Italy	Olmo	
30	Quirino Toccaceli	Italy	Olmo	
31	Mario De Benedetti	Italy	Olmo	
32	Carlo Rebella	Italy	Olmo	
33	Vincenzo Rossello	Italy	Olmo	
34	Antonio Giauna	Italy	Olmo	
35	Joseph Magnani	Italy	Olmo	
36	Cesare Del Cancia	Italy	Welter	
37	Michele Motta	Italy	Welter	
38	Alfredo Martini	Italy	Welter	
39	Gino Fondi	Italy	Welter	
40	Giulio Bresci	Italy	Welter	
41	Nedo Logli	Italy	Welter	
42	Aimone Landi	Italy	Welter	
43	Giordano Cottur	Italy	Wilier Triestina	
44	Antonio Bevilacqua	Italy	Wilier Triestina	
45	Giovanni Brotto	Italy	Wilier Triestina	
46	Egidio Feruglio	Italy	Wilier Triestina	
47	Giannino Piccolroaz	Italy	Wilier Triestina	
48	Angelo Degano	Italy	Wilier Triestina	
49	Angelo Menon	Italy	Wilier Triestina	
51	Ubaldo Pugnaloni	Italy	Milan–Gazzetta	
52	Egidio Marangoni	Italy	Milan–Gazzetta	
53	Bruno Pasquini	Italy	Milan–Gazzetta	
54	Tino Ausenda	Italy	Milan–Gazzetta	
55	Luigi Malabrocca	Italy	Milan–Gazzetta	
56	Luigi Casola	Italy	Velo Club Bustese	
57	Aldo Baito	Italy	Velo Club Bustese	
58	Silvio Furlan	Italy	Velo Club Bustese	
59	Primo Volpi	Italy	Velo Club Bustese	
60	Paolo Ferrari	Italy	Velo Club Bustese	
61	Andrea Giacometti	Italy	Fronte Gioventu	
62	Enzo Coppini	Italy	Fronte Gioventu	
63	Giovanni Ballarino	Italy	Fronte Gioventu	
64	Francesco Locatelli	Italy	Fronte Gioventu	
65	Serafino Biagioni	Italy	Fronte Gioventu	
66	Salvatore Crippa	Italy	ENAL–Campari	
67	Diego Marabelli	Italy	ENAL–Campari	
68	Vittorio Magni	Italy	ENAL–Campari	
69	Guerrino Amadori	Italy	ENAL–Campari	
70	Remo Sala	Italy	ENAL–Campari	
71	Mario Spinazzi	Italy	Azzini Freno–Universal	
72	Dante Colombo	Italy	Azzini Freno–Universal	
73	Ennio Nardini	Italy	Azzini Freno–Universal	
74	Augusto Introzzi	Italy	Azzini Freno–Universal	
75	Carlo Moscardini	Italy	Azzini Freno–Universal	
76	Ezio Cecchi	Italy	Centro Sportivo Italiano	
77	Marcello Spadolini	Italy	Centro Sportivo Italiano	
78	Fausto Montesi	Italy	Centro Sportivo Italiano	
79	Walter Generati	Italy	Centro Sportivo Italiano	
80	Doro Morigi	Italy	Centro Sportivo Italiano	
