= 1950 Giro d'Italia =

Race details
- Dates: 24 May - 13 June 1950
- Stages: 18
- Distance: 3,981 km (2,474 mi)
- Winning time: 117h 28' 03"

Results
Jersey awarded to the overall winner	Winner	Hugo Koblet (SUI)	(Guerra–Ursus)
	Second	Gino Bartali (ITA)	(Bartali)
	Third	Alfredo Martini (ITA)	(Taurea)
	Mountains	Hugo Koblet (SUI)	(Guerra–Ursus)
	Sprints	Annibale Brasola (ITA)	(Benotto)
	Team	Fréjus–Superga	

The 1950 Giro d'Italia was the 33rd edition of the Giro d'Italia, one of cycling's Grand Tours. The Giro started in Milan on 24 May with a 225 km (139.8 mi) individual time trial and concluded in Salsomaggiore Terme with a 230 km (142.9 mi) relatively flat mass-start stage on 13 June. Fifteen teams entered the race, which was won by Swiss Hugo Koblet of the Guerra team. Second and third respectively were Italians Gino Bartali and Alfredo Martini.

== Teams ==
It was announced in January 1950 that there would not be more than 100 riders starting the race. However, fifteen teams of seven were granted entry for the race. This meant the starting peloton consisted of 105 cyclists, the same amount that started the 1949 edition. Italians comprised the majority of the entrants (88), while the remaining 17 foreign riders were from France (9), Switzerland (5), Belgium (2), and Luxembourg (1). Of the starting riders, 75 completed the course.

The teams entering the race were:

- Arbos
- Atala
- Bartali
- Benotto
- Bianchi–Ursus
- Bottecchia
- Cimatti
- Fréjus–Superga
- Ganna–Superga
- Guerra–Ursus
- Helyett–Hutchinson
- Legnano–Pirelli
- Taurea
- Viscontea
- Wilier Triestina

== Pre-race favorites ==
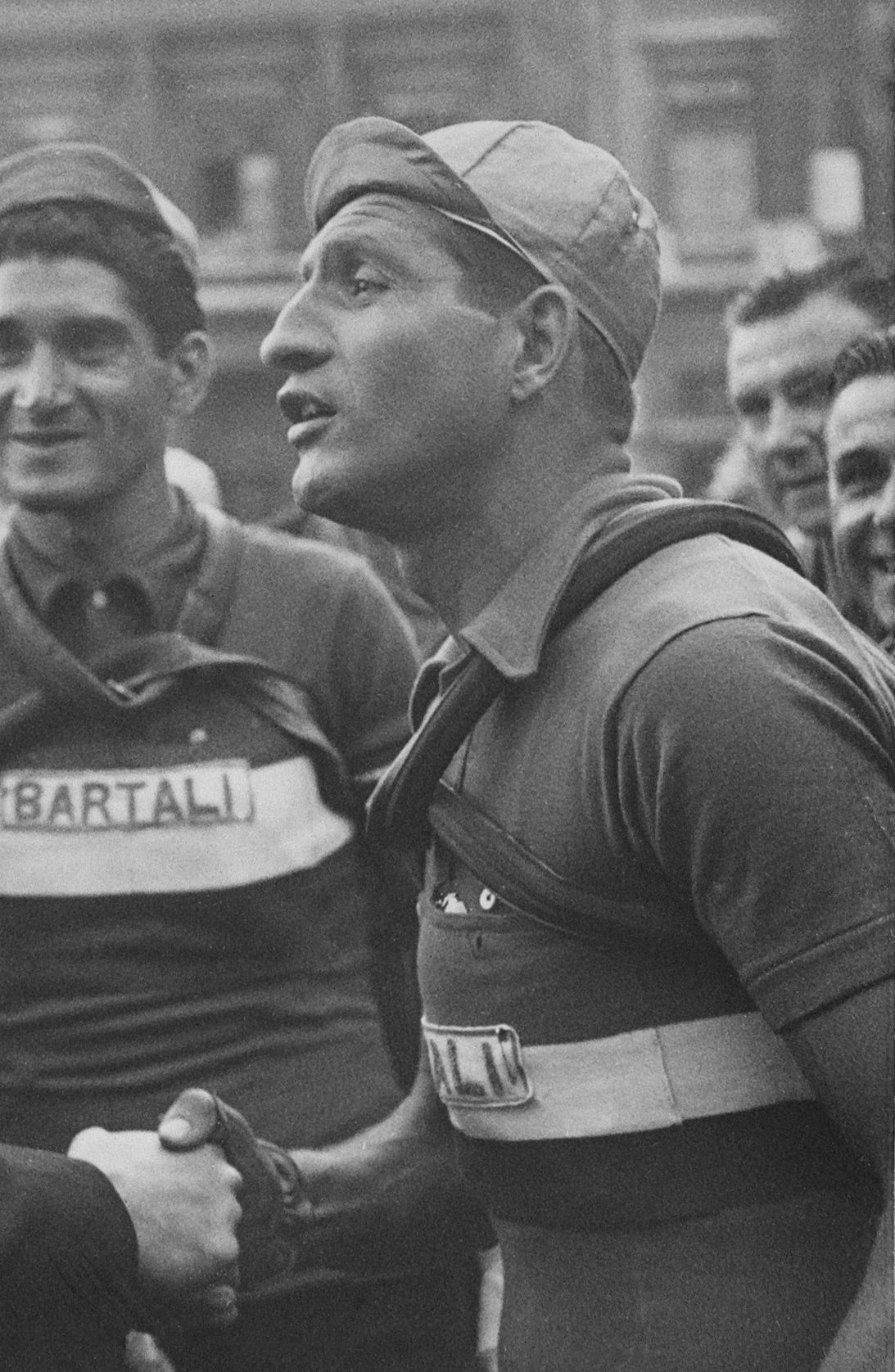
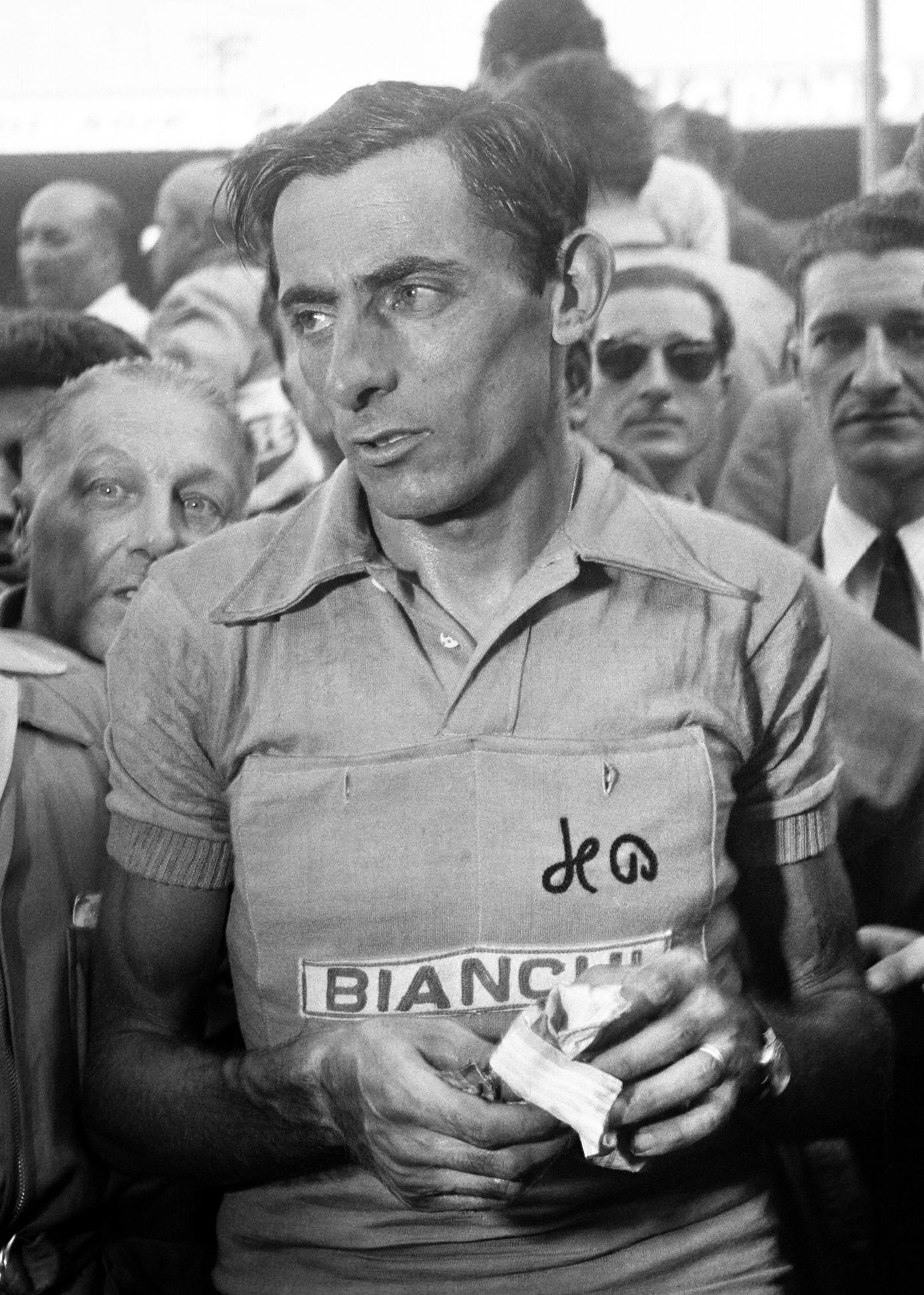
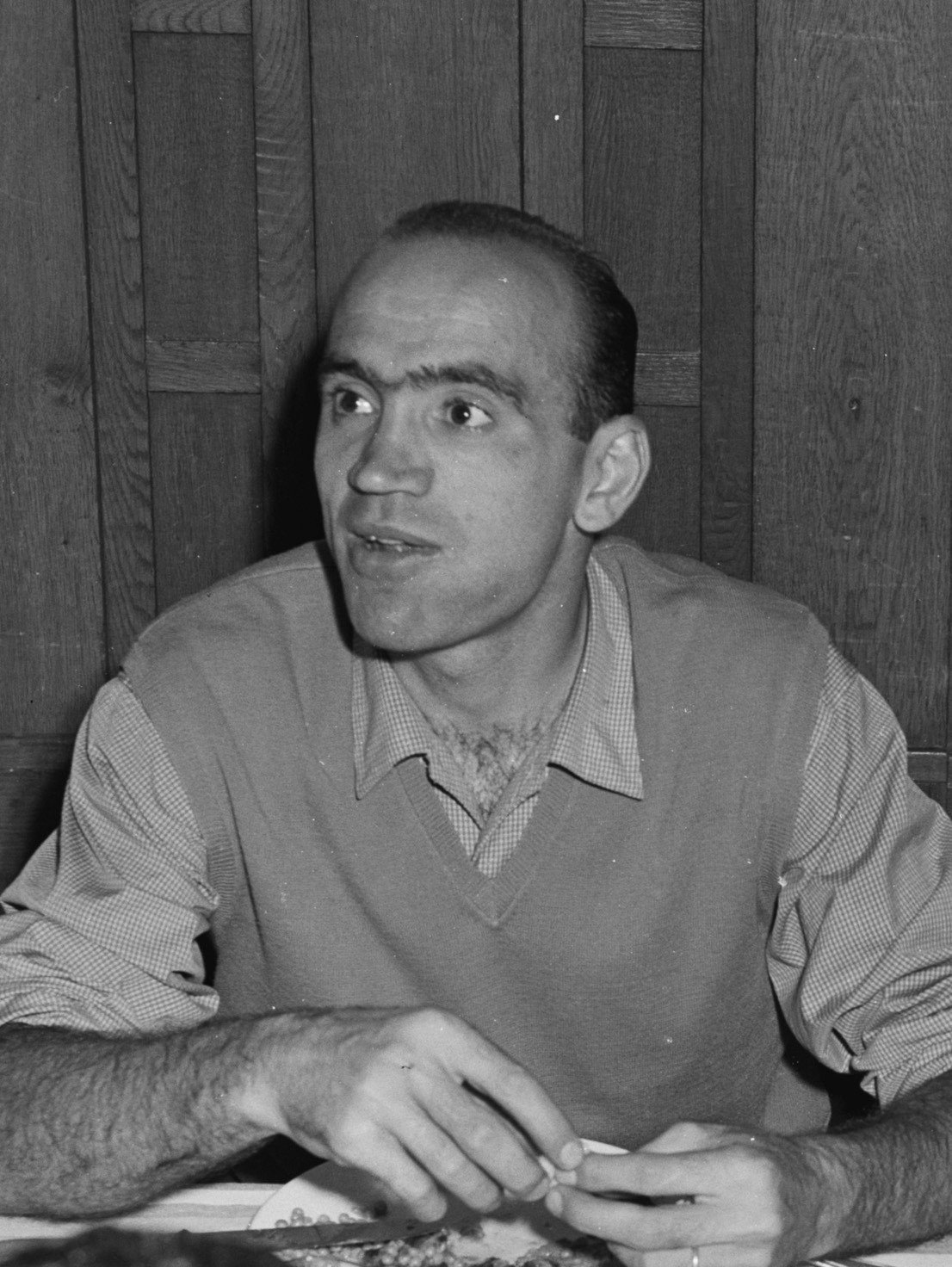
Gino Bartali (left, pictured at the 1950 Tour de France), Fausto Coppi (center, pictured at the 1952 Tour de France), and Fiorenzo Magni (right, pictured at the 1951 Tour de France) were later known as the "Big Three" in Italian cycling. Bartali and Coppi both entered having won three editions of the Giro each, while Magni had won only one (1948).

The race featured three previous winners of the Giro d'Italia that later became known as the "Big Three" or "Italian Tripod": Gino Bartali (Bartali), Fausto Coppi (Bianchi–Ursus), and Fiorenzo Magni (Wilier Triestina). That season the three of them had success in the classics as Bartali won Milan–San Remo, Coppi won Paris–Roubaix and La Flèche Wallonne, and Magni won his second Tour of Flanders. Despite this, many writers and fellow riders like Magni, Jean Robic, and Giulio Bresci still viewed it as a competition between Coppi and Bartali, with Coppi was regarded as the favorite entering the race. When asked who was his toughest opponent in the race, Coppi answered Bartali and Robic.

A Nouvelliste valaisan writer commented that this was the first Giro to feature foreigners as team captains. 1947 Tour de France winner Robic (Viscontea), Fritz Schär (Arbos), and Ferdinand Kübler (Fréjus–Superga) entered as sole leaders of their respective squads. Guerra–Ursus's leader upon entry was Belgian Marcel Dupont, while teammate Hugo Koblet's recent form made some believe he may end up leading the team during the race. El Mundo Deportivo's Luis Bettonica felt that for either Bartali or Coppi to not win they will have to face a large amount of difficulties. Vito Ortelli (Atala) was not viewed as a serious challenger following a poor performance at the Tour de Romandie and due to his general inconsistent finishes. Ortelli when asked about his intentions at the Giro, replied "I will be running it." Kübler was seen as a threat to challenge Bartali and Coppi because his team was strong and had openly stated he would be in good form when the race hits Locarno. The French team (Helyett–Hutchinson) featured Apo Lazaridès and Lucien Teisseire, who placed second and third at the 1948 world championships, respectively. Legnano–Pirelli brought sprinter Adolfo Leoni who won several stages and wore the race leader's pink jersey late into the last year's race before Coppi took the race lead with two stages left and young rider Pasquale Fornara. Taurea's Luciano Maggini was seen as a contender for the sprint finishes, while Alfredo Martini and Giancarlo Astrua were expected to achieve high final rankings in the general classification. l'Unità writer Attilio Camoriano expected Martini to be the "big surprise of the race."

== Route and stages ==
Before being released, it was rumored the race would go from 24 May to 11 June. The route was revealed on 26 January 1950. The route was thought to be easier than in previous years, with the first several stages being fairly easy before the seventh stage introduced climbs over 1,100 m (3,609 ft). The ninth stage in particular featured the three major climbs of Passo Rolle (1,970 m (6,463 ft)), Passo Pordoi (2,239 m (7,346 ft)), Gardena Pass (2,120 m (6,955 ft)). In total the route was thought to be very flat as it contained 15,000 m (49,213 ft) of climbing.

In a break from tradition the race started in Milan rather than finishing in . This change was precipitated because 1950 was declared a Jubilee by Pope Pius XII. Due to the route changes, this meant the Dolomites would be visited during the middle of the race, while the Apennines would be traversed near the race's conclusion. Following the Milan opening in the Piazza del Duomo square, the race route veered west passing through Florence and Genoa on its way into the Dolomites and passing through finishing in Locarno, a Swiss town. Then the route turned south and traveled down along the Adriatic coast and traversed the Apennines before returning north to finish in Rome.

Stage characteristics and results
Stage	Date	Course	Distance	Type	Winner
1	24 May	Milan to Salsomaggiore Terme	225 km (140 mi)	Plain stage	Oreste Conte (ITA)
2	25 May	Salsomaggiore Terme to Florence	245 km (152 mi)	Stage with mountain(s)	Alfredo Martini (ITA)
3	26 May	Florence to Livorno	148 km (92 mi)	Plain stage	Olimpio Bizzi (ITA)
4	27 May	Livorno to Genoa	216 km (134 mi)	Stage with mountain(s)	Antonio Bevilacqua (ITA)
5	28 May	Genoa to Turin	245 km (152 mi)	Plain stage	Franco Franchi (ITA)
6	29 May	Turin to Locarno (Switzerland)	220 km (137 mi)	Plain stage	Hugo Koblet (SUI)
7	31 May	Locarno (Switzerland) to Brescia	293 km (182 mi)	Stage with mountain(s)	Luciano Maggini (ITA)
8	1 June	Brescia to Vicenza	214 km (133 mi)	Stage with mountain(s)	Hugo Koblet (SUI)
9	2 June	Vicenza to Bolzano	272 km (169 mi)	Stage with mountain(s)	Gino Bartali (ITA)
	3 June	Rest day			
10	4 June	Bolzano to Milan	294 km (183 mi)	Plain stage	Mario Fazio (ITA)
11	5 June	Milan to Ferrara	251 km (156 mi)	Plain stage	Adolfo Leoni (ITA)
12	6 June	Ferrara to Rimini	144 km (89 mi)	Plain stage	Antonio Bevilacqua (ITA)
13	7 June	Rimini to Arezzo	244 km (152 mi)	Stage with mountain(s)	Luciano Maggini (ITA)
14	8 June	Arezzo to Perugia	185 km (115 mi)	Stage with mountain(s)	Fritz Schär (SUI)
	9 June	Rest day			
15	10 June	Perugia to L'Aquila	185 km (115 mi)	Stage with mountain(s)	Giancarlo Astrua (ITA)
16	11 June	L'Aquila to Campobasso	203 km (126 mi)	Stage with mountain(s)	Fiorenzo Magni (ITA)
17	12 June	Campobasso to Naples	167 km (104 mi)	Plain stage	Annibale Brasola (ITA)
18	13 June	Naples to Rome	230 km (143 mi)	Plain stage	Oreste Conte (ITA)
	Total		3,981 km (2,474 mi)		

== Classification leadership ==
The leader of the general classification – calculated by adding the stage finish times of each rider, and subtracting time bonuses – wore a pink jersey. This classification is the most important of the race, and its winner is considered as the winner of the Giro. A one-minute bonus was given to the winner of each stage, the intermediate sprint in the twelve stages containing a sprint, and the winner of a mountain classification climb. Second place in those same categories awarded a 30 s time bonus.

Two additional jerseys were awarded. The green jersey was given to the highest ranked non-Italian cyclist in the general classification, and the white jersey was given to the highest ranked independent cyclist in the general classification. Another green jersey was awarded to the best placed foreign rider in the general classification.

There were also some classifications without associated jerseys. There was the mountains classification, for which the race organizers selected different mountains that the route crossed and awarded points to the five riders who crossed them first.

There was a black jersey (maglia nera) awarded to the rider placed last in the general classification. The classification was calculated in the same manner as the general classification.

Secondly, there was an intermediate sprints classification. In twelve stages, there were intermediate sprints midway of the stage, where points for this classification could be won.

The winner of the team classification was determined by adding the finish times of the best three cyclists per team together and the team with the lowest total time was the winner. If a team had fewer than three riders finish, they were not eligible for the classification.

The rows in the following table correspond to the jerseys awarded after that stage was run.

Classification leadership by stage
Stage	Winner	General classification	Best foreign rider	Best independent rider	Mountains classification	Intermediate sprints classification	Last in General classification	Team classification
1	Oreste Conte	Oreste Conte	Désiré Keteleer	Umberto Drei	not awarded	not awarded	Aldo Tosi & Egidio Feruglio	Bianchi–Ursus
2	Alfredo Martini	Fritz Schär	Fritz Schär	Silvio Pedroni	Fritz Schär	Hugo Koblet	Marcello Paolieri	Taurea
3	Olimpio Bizzi	Fritz Schär	Fritz Schär	Silvio Pedroni	Fritz Schär	Hugo Koblet	Marcello Paolieri	Taurea
4	Antonio Bevilacqua	Fritz Schär	Fritz Schär	Silvio Pedroni	Hugo Koblet	Hugo Koblet	Marcello Paolieri	Taurea
5	Franco Franchi	Fritz Schär	Fritz Schär	Silvio Pedroni	Hugo Koblet	Hugo Koblet	Marcello Paolieri	Taurea
6	Hugo Koblet	Fritz Schär	Fritz Schär	Silvio Pedroni	Hugo Koblet	Annibale Brasola	Marcello Paolieri	Taurea
7	Luciano Maggini	Alfredo Martini	Fritz Schär	Silvio Pedroni	Fausto Coppi	Annibale Brasola	Mario Gestri	Taurea
8	Hugo Koblet	Hugo Koblet	Fritz Schär	Silvio Pedroni	Hugo Koblet	Annibale Brasola	Giuseppe Molinari	Taurea
9	Gino Bartali	Hugo Koblet	Hugo Koblet	Silvio Pedroni	Hugo Koblet	Annibale Brasola	Serse Coppi	Taurea
10	Mario Fazio	Hugo Koblet	Hugo Koblet	Silvio Pedroni	Hugo Koblet	Annibale Brasola	Mario Gestri	Taurea
11	Adolfo Leoni	Hugo Koblet	Hugo Koblet	Silvio Pedroni	Hugo Koblet	Annibale Brasola	Mario Gestri	Taurea
12	Antonio Bevilacqua	Hugo Koblet	Hugo Koblet	Silvio Pedroni	Hugo Koblet	Annibale Brasola	Mario Gestri	Taurea
13	Luciano Maggini	Hugo Koblet	Hugo Koblet	Silvio Pedroni	Hugo Koblet	Annibale Brasola	Mario Gestri	Fréjus–Superga
14	Fritz Schär	Hugo Koblet	Hugo Koblet	Silvio Pedroni	Hugo Koblet	Annibale Brasola	Mario Gestri	Fréjus–Superga
15	Giancarlo Astrua	Hugo Koblet	Hugo Koblet	Silvio Pedroni	Hugo Koblet	Annibale Brasola	Mario Gestri	Fréjus–Superga
16	Fiorenzo Magni	Hugo Koblet	Hugo Koblet	Silvio Pedroni	Hugo Koblet	Annibale Brasola	Mario Gestri	Fréjus–Superga
17	Annibale Brasola	Hugo Koblet	Hugo Koblet	Silvio Pedroni	Hugo Koblet	Annibale Brasola	Mario Gestri	Fréjus–Superga
18	Oreste Conte	Hugo Koblet	Hugo Koblet	Silvio Pedroni	Hugo Koblet	Annibale Brasola	Mario Gestri	Fréjus–Superga
Final		Hugo Koblet	Hugo Koblet	Silvio Pedroni	Hugo Koblet	Annibale Brasola	Mario Gestri	Fréjus–Superga

== Final standings ==
Legend
A pink jersey	Denotes the winner of the General classification
A white jersey	Denotes the winner of the Independent rider
A green jersey	Denotes the winner of the Foreign rider classification

=== General classification ===
Final general classification (1–10)
Rank	Rider	Team	Time
1	Hugo Koblet (SUI)	Guerra–Ursus	117h 28' 03"
2	Gino Bartali (ITA)	Bartali	+ 5' 12"
3	Alfredo Martini (ITA)	Taurea	+ 8' 41"
4	Ferdinand Kübler (SUI)	Fréjus–Superga	+ 8' 45"
5	Luciano Maggini (ITA)	Taurea	+ 10' 49"
6	Fiorenzo Magni (ITA)	Wilier Triestina	+ 12' 14"
7	Silvio Pedroni (ITA)	Fréjus–Superga	+ 13' 07"
8	Luciano Pezzi (ITA)	Atala	+ 14' 34"
9	Giulio Bresci (ITA)	Bottecchia	+ 18' 08"
10	Pietro Giudici (ITA)	Cimatti	+ 20' 05"

=== Foreign rider classification ===
Final foreign rider classification (1–10)
Rank	Rider	Team	Time
1	Hugo Koblet (SUI)	Guerra–Ursus	117h 28' 03"
2	Ferdinand Kübler (SUI)	Fréjus–Superga	+ 8' 43"
3	Fritz Schär (SUI)	Arbos	+ 23' 53"
4	Nello Lauredi (FRA)	Helyett–Hutchinson	+ 26' 39"
5	André Brule (FRA)	Viscontea	+ 1h 25' 54"
6	Apo Lazaridès (FRA)	Helyett–Hutchinson	+ 1h 27' 50"
7	Jean Goldschmit (LUX)	Fréjus–Superga	+ 1h 43' 17"
8	Désiré Keteleer (BEL)	Bianchi–Ursus	+ 1h 46' 29"
9	Gottfried Weilenmann (SUI)	Guerra–Ursus	+ 1h 58' 22"
10	José Beyaert (FRA)	Helyett–Hutchinson	+ 2h 00' 12"

=== Independent rider classification ===
Final independent rider classification (1–10)
Rank	Rider	Team	Time
1	Silvio Pedroni (ITA)	Fréjus–Superga	117h 41' 10"
2	Pietro Giudici (ITA)	Cimatti	+ 6' 58"
3	Donato Zampini (ITA)	Ganna–Superga	+ 13' 29"
4	Armando Barducci (ITA)	Fréjus–Superga	+ 15' 27"
5	Giacomo Zampieri (ITA)	Bottecchia	+ 21' 31"
6	Franco Franchi (ITA)	Taurea	+ 39' 10"
7	Valerio Bonini (ITA)	Benotto	+ 54' 14"
8	Sergio Pagliazzi (ITA)	Arbos	+ 1h 02' 42"
9	Leo Castellucci (ITA)	Arbos	+ 1h 07' 12"
10	Renzo Soldani (ITA)	Legnano–Pirelli	+ 1h 10' 31"

=== Mountains classification ===
Final mountains classification (1–9)
Rank	Rider	Team	Points
1	Hugo Koblet (SUI)	Guerra–Ursus	43
2	Gino Bartali (ITA)	Bartali	29
3	Jean Robic (FRA)	Viscontea	21
4	Vittorio Rossello (ITA)	Taurea	11
4	Fritz Schär (SUI)	Arbos	11
6	Pasquale Fornara (ITA)	Legnano–Pirelli	10
7	Fausto Coppi (ITA)	Bianchi–Ursus	9
8	Serse Coppi (ITA)	Bianchi–Ursus	8
9	Valerio Bonini (ITA)	Benotto	6
9	Alfredo Martini (ITA)	Taurea	6
9	Ferdinand Kübler (SUI)	Legnano–Pirelli	6
9	Aldo Ronconi (ITA)	Benotto	6

=== Intermediate sprints classification ===
Final intermediate sprints classification (1–9)
Rank	Rider	Team	Points
1	Annibale Brasola (ITA)	Benotto	27
2	Oreste Conte (ITA)	Bianchi–Ursus	20
3	Hugo Koblet (SUI)	Guerra–Ursus	15
4	Giovanni Corrieri (ITA)	Bartali	10
4	Renzo Zanazzi (ITA)	Arbos	10
6	Ferdinand Kübler (SUI)	Fréjus–Superga	9
7	Serse Coppi (ITA)	Bianchi–Ursus	8
7	Antonio Bevilacqua (ITA)	Wilier Triestina	8
9	Primo Volpi (ITA)	Viscontea	7

=== Team classification ===
Final team classification (1–10)
Rank	Team	Time
1	Fréjus–Superga	353h 14' 35"
2	Taurea	+ 21' 21"
3	Cimatti	+ 41' 19"
4	Bottecchia	+ 46' 10"
5	Legnano–Pirelli	+ 1h 53' 15"
6	Arbos	+ 2h 00' 35"
7	Benotto	+ 2h 37' 08"
8	Atala	+ 2h 42' 23"
9	Viscontea	+ 2h 46' 44"
10	Guerra–Ursus	+ 2h 52' 58"

=== Minor awards ===
Two blue bracelets were awarded for winning a stage with the greatest time gap between the second placed rider. Koblet won the first bracelet for winning the sixth stage into Locarno by 1' 48s, while the second bracelet was given to Astrua for his victory on the fifteenth leg that finished in L'Aquila. He won that stage by five minutes and six seconds. A classification was kept regarding the amount of stage victories per rider. The classification was split by four riders who each won two stages: Conte (stages 1 and 18), Bevilacqua (stages 4 and 12), Koblet (stages, and 8), and Luciano Maggini (stages 7 and 13).

== Aftermath ==
Following the race, the entire peloton that finished the race traveled to St. Peter's Basilica to hear a Wednesday service by Pope Pius XII on 14 June. In particular, Koblet and Bartali spoke with the Pope personally and the Pope asked of Coppi's health. Previous winner Fausto Coppi, who was recovering in a Trento hospital, commented "Koblet deserved to win the Tour of Italy and he is worthy of all praise." Following the race, Guerra announced Koblet renewed his contract with the team. A Swiss newspaper writer Nouvelliste Valaisan wrote that the Swiss riders dominated the race, holding the race lead for all but two days, and all five Swiss riders that started, finished the race. The writer commented that Koblet was not seen as the initial leader for Guerra, as Marcel Dupont entered as their leader. The writer also felt that Koblet's victory earned Swiss cycling respect within the cycling community and may lead to an invitation for a ten-man team to a future Tour de France – which at the time was contested by national teams rather than trade teams. Ferdinand Kübler was viewed to have a great race relative when compared to his last Grand Tour, the 1949 Tour de France. Based on his high finish Kübler was expected to seriously contend at the upcoming Tour de France. Had the race been run without time bonuses factored into the general classification, Bartali would have won the race by 18 seconds over Koblet.
