= 1952 Giro d'Italia =

Race details
- Dates: 17 May - 8 June 1952
- Stages: 20
- Distance: 3,964 km (2,463 mi)
- Winning time: 114h 36' 43"

Results
Jersey awarded to the overall winner	Winner	Fausto Coppi (ITA)	(Bianchi)
	Second	Fiorenzo Magni (ITA)	(Ganna)
	Third	Ferdinand Kübler (SUI)	(Fiorelli)
	Mountains	Raphaël Géminiani (FRA)	(Bianchi)
	Team	Bianchi	

The 1952 Giro d'Italia was the 35th edition of the Giro d'Italia, one of cycling's Grand Tours. The Giro started off in Milan on 17 May with a 217 km (134.8 mi) flat stage and concluded back in Milan with a 147 km (91.3 mi) relatively flat mass-start stage on 8 June. Sixteen teams entered the race, which was won by Italian Fausto Coppi of the Bianchi team. Second and third respectively were Italian Fiorenzo Magni and Swiss rider Ferdinand Kübler.

== Teams ==
Nineteen teams were invited by the race organizers to participate in the 1952 edition of the Giro d'Italia, but only seventeen accepted the invitation. It was planned to have a team of seven German riders, sponsored by Paglianti, so they were assigned bib numbers 71 to 77. A few days before the start of the 1952 Giro, it became clear that there had been a miscommunication between the Giro organisation and the German cycling authority: the German cycling organisation was not planning to send riders, because they never reached an agreement on the financial compensation. Each team sent a squad of seven riders, which meant that the race started with a peloton of 112 cyclists. From the riders that began the race, 98 made it to the finish in Milan.

The teams entering the race were:

- Arbos
- Atala
- Bartali
- Benotto
- Bianchi
- Bottecchia
- Fiorelli
- Fréjus
- Ganna–Ursus
- Garin
- Girardengo
- Guerra
- Legnano
- Nilux
- Torpado
- Welter

== Pre-race favorites ==
The "Big Three" of Italian cycling started the race and were all seen as strong favorites to win the race. Reigning champion Fiorenzo Magni (Ganna) started the race with hopes of winning the race a third time (He also won in 1948). Three-time champion (1940, 1947, & 1949) Fausto Coppi (Bianchi). Gino Bartali (Bartali) made his twelfth start at the race, with a history of winning the race three times (1936, 1937, & 1946) and four second-place finishes.

Due to the participation of several strong riders at the time, including many non-Italian riders, at the race was thought to be very competitive and the event growing into a more international event. Current Swiss road race champion and world road race champion Ferdinand Kübler (Fiorelli) started the race. Kübler entered the race after having won two of the three races comprising the Ardennes classics that took place in early May (Liège–Bastogne–Liège and La Flèche Wallonne). He was seen as a strong favorite to contend for the general classification, along with having a strong team in support. Hugo Koblet (Guerra), who won the 1950 Giro d'Italia, started the race. Attilio Camoriano of l'Unità wrote that Koblet could be a threat in the race if he was not using it as preparation for the upcoming Tour de France. The previous year's runner-up Rik Van Steenbergen and teammate Stan Ockers (Girardengo) were seen as the best Belgian entrants with general classification chances. Milan–San Remo winner Loretto Petrucci (Bianchi) was known to ride for Coppi, but there were thoughts that he would be able to attack after the Dolomites.

The Nilux team featured three Australian riders, who may have been the first Australian riders to participate in the race. The Torpado team featured famed Spanish riders Bernardo Ruiz and Jesús Loroño. It was noted that top French riders at the time were lacking from the race's start list, although Raphaël Géminiani (Bianchi) did participate as a support for Coppi. Géminiani had finished second at the 1951 Tour de France and had the reputation of a climber. Tour de Romandie winner Wout Wagtmans (Garin) was set to ride the Giro, but withdrew at the last moment. It was speculated to be a battle between Swiss and Italian riders.

== Route and stages ==
The route was revealed on 29 February 1952. The race route contained twenty stages, of which two were individual time trials, as well as three rest days. There were twelve categorized climbs that awarded points for the mountains classification across seven stages.

The route was thought to give chances of success to all types of riders as there were several flat stages, "mixed" stages, time trials, and mountainous stages. The first time trial was flat, while the second had a final 7 km (4 mi) that was downhill. The eleventh and nineteenth stages were seen as the most important. The eleventh leg featured three climbs as the race traveled from Venice to Bolzano and climbed the Falzarego, Pordoi Pass, and Passo Sella. Stage 19 stretched from Saint-Vincent to Verbania and featured the climbs of Great St Bernard Pass, which was the highest pass of the race at 2,473 m (8,114 ft), and Simplon Pass. Camoriano wrote when the route was announced that the route was open and good for those that are "capable and complete."

Stage characteristics and results
Stage	Date	Course	Distance	Type	Winner
1	17 May	Milan to Bologna	217 km (135 mi)	Plain stage	Giorgio Albani (ITA)
2	18 May	Bologna to Montecatini Terme	197 km (122 mi)	Stage with mountain(s)	Angelo Conterno (ITA)
3	19 May	Montecatini Terme to Siena	205 km (127 mi)	Plain stage	Antonio Bevilacqua (ITA)
4	20 May	Siena to Rome	250 km (155 mi)	Stage with mountain(s)	Désiré Keteleer (BEL)
	21 May	Rest day			
5	22 May	Rome to Rocca di Papa	35 km (22 mi)	Individual time trial	Fausto Coppi (ITA)
6	23 May	Rome to Naples	23 km (14 mi)	Plain stage	Rik Van Steenbergen (BEL)
7	24 May	Naples to Roccaraso	140 km (87 mi)	Stage with mountain(s)	Giorgio Albani (ITA)
8	25 May	Roccaraso to Ancona	224 km (139 mi)	Plain stage	Rino Benedetti (ITA)
9	26 May	Ancona to Riccione	250 km (155 mi)	Plain stage	Rik Van Steenbergen (BEL)
10	27 May	Riccione to Venezia	285 km (177 mi)	Plain stage	Rik Van Steenbergen (BEL)
	28 May	Rest day			
11	29 May	Venezia to Bolzano	276 km (171 mi)	Stage with mountain(s)	Fausto Coppi (ITA)
12	30 May	Bolzano to Bergamo	226 km (140 mi)	Plain stage	Oreste Conte (ITA)
13	31 May	Bergamo to Como	143 km (89 mi)	Plain stage	Alfredo Pasotti (ITA)
14	1 June	Erba to Como	65 km (40 mi)	Individual time trial	Fausto Coppi (ITA)
15	2 June	Como to Genoa	247 km (153 mi)	Plain stage	Giuseppe Minardi (ITA)
16	3 June	Genoa to Sanremo	141 km (88 mi)	Plain stage	Annibale Brasola (ITA)
	4 June	Rest day			
17	5 June	Sanremo to Cuneo	190 km (118 mi)	Stage with mountain(s)	Nino Defilippis (ITA)
18	6 June	Cuneo to Saint-Vincent	190 km (118 mi)	Plain stage	Pasquale Fornara (ITA)
19	7 June	Saint-Vincent to Verbania	298 km (185 mi)	Stage with mountain(s)	Fritz Schär (SUI)
20	8 June	Verbania to Milan	147 km (91 mi)	Plain stage	Antonio Bevilacqua (ITA)
	Total		3,964 km (2,463 mi)		

== Classification leadership ==
The leader of the general classification – calculated by adding the stage finish times of each rider – wore a pink jersey. This classification is the most important of the race, and its winner is considered as the winner of the Giro. There were no time bonuses in 1951.

There were several secondary classification. The highest ranked cyclist riding with a licence for independents was identified by the white jersey; at the end of the Giro this was Donato Zampini. Another classification was calculated in the same method, but was exclusive to foreign riders and awarded a green jersey.

The mountains classification leader wore no leader's jersey. There was one category for mountains which awarded 6, 4, 3, 2, and 1 point to the first five riders. Although no jersey was awarded, there was also one classification for the teams, in which the stage finish times of best three cyclists per team per stage were added; the leading team was the one with the lowest total time.

Classification leadership by stage
Stage	Winner	General classification	Best foreign rider	Best independent rider	Mountains classification	Team classification
1	Giorgio Albani	Giorgio Albani	Rik Van Steenbergen	Adolfo Grosso	not awarded	Legnano
2	Angelo Conterno	Angelo Conterno	Raphaël Géminiani & Alex Close	Angelo Conterno	Raphaël Géminiani	Legnano
3	Antonio Bevilacqua	Nino Defilippis	Raphaël Géminiani & Alex Close	Nino Defilippis	Raphaël Géminiani	Legnano
4	Désiré Keteleer	Nino Defilippis	Raphaël Géminiani & Alex Close	Nino Defilippis	Raphaël Géminiani	Legnano
5	Fausto Coppi	Giancarlo Astrua	Raphaël Géminiani	Donato Zampini	Raphaël Géminiani	Legnano
6	Rik Van Steenbergen	Giancarlo Astrua	Raphaël Géminiani	Giacomo Zampieri	Raphaël Géminiani	Bianchi
7	Giorgio Albani	Giancarlo Astrua	Raphaël Géminiani	Giacomo Zampieri	Raphaël Géminiani	Bianchi
8	Rino Benedetti	Giancarlo Astrua	Raphaël Géminiani	Giacomo Zampieri	Raphaël Géminiani	Legnano
9	Rik Van Steenbergen	Giancarlo Astrua	Raphaël Géminiani	Giacomo Zampieri	Raphaël Géminiani	Legnano
10	Rik Van Steenbergen	Fausto Coppi	Ferdinand Kübler	Giacomo Zampieri	Raphaël Géminiani	Bottecchia
11	Fausto Coppi	Fausto Coppi	Ferdinand Kübler	Donato Zampini	Fausto Coppi	Bianchi
12	Oreste Conte	Fausto Coppi	Ferdinand Kübler	Donato Zampini	Fausto Coppi	Bianchi
13	Alfredo Pasotti	Fausto Coppi	Ferdinand Kübler	Donato Zampini	Fausto Coppi	Bianchi
14	Fausto Coppi	Fausto Coppi	Ferdinand Kübler	Donato Zampini	Fausto Coppi	Bianchi
15	Giuseppe Minardi	Fausto Coppi	Ferdinand Kübler	Donato Zampini	Fausto Coppi	Bianchi
16	Annibale Brasola	Fausto Coppi	Ferdinand Kübler	Donato Zampini	Fausto Coppi	Bianchi
17	Nino Defilippis	Fausto Coppi	Ferdinand Kübler	Donato Zampini	Fausto Coppi & Raphaël Géminiani	Bianchi
18	Pasquale Fornara	Fausto Coppi	Ferdinand Kübler	Donato Zampini	Fausto Coppi & Raphaël Géminiani	Bottecchia
19	Fritz Schär	Fausto Coppi	Ferdinand Kübler	Donato Zampini	Raphaël Géminiani	Bianchi
20	Antonio Bevilacqua	Fausto Coppi	Ferdinand Kübler	Donato Zampini	Raphaël Géminiani	Bianchi
Final		Fausto Coppi	Ferdinand Kübler	Donato Zampini	Raphaël Géminiani	Bianchi

== Final standings ==
Legend
A pink jersey	Denotes the winner of the General classification
A white jersey	Denotes the best independent rider
A green jersey	Denotes the best foreign rider

=== General classification ===
Final general classification (1–10)
Rank	Name	Team	Time
1	Fausto Coppi (ITA)	Bianchi	114h 36' 43"
2	Fiorenzo Magni (ITA)	Ganna	+ 9' 18"
3	Ferdinand Kübler (SUI)	Fiorelli	+ 9' 24"
4	Donato Zampini (ITA)	Benotto	+ 10' 29"
5	Gino Bartali (ITA)	Bartali	+ 10' 33"
6	Stan Ockers (BEL)	Girardengo	+ 10'58"
7	Giancarlo Astrua (ITA)	Atala	+ 14' 30"
8	Hugo Koblet (SUI)	Guerra	+ 14' 38"
9	Raphaël Géminiani (FRA)	Bianchi	+ 16' 44"
10	Giorgio Albani (ITA)	Legnano	+ 18' 14"

=== Independent rider classification ===
Final Independent rider classification (1–8)
Rank	Name	Time
1	Donato Zampini (ITA)	114h 47' 12"
2	Giacomo Zampieri (ITA)	+ 8' 23"
3	Giovanni Roma (ITA)	+ 13' 28"
4	Vittorio Rossello (ITA)	+ 14' 00"
5	Arrigo Padovan (ITA)	+ 15' 28"
6	Elio Brasola (ITA)	+ 17' 33"
7	Nino Defilippis (ITA)	+ 22' 08"
8	Carlo Clerici (SUI)	+ 25' 00"

=== Mountains classification ===
Final mountains classification (1–4)
	Name	Team	Points
1	Raphaël Géminiani (FRA)	Bianchi	31
2	Fausto Coppi (ITA)	Bianchi	28
3	Gino Bartali (ITA)	Bartali	23
4	Giancarlo Astrua (ITA)	Atala	16

=== Team classification ===
Final team classification (1-3)
	Team	Time
1	Bianchi	344h 56' 35"
2	Bottecchia	+ 4' 25"
3	Legnano	+ 11' 24"

Kubler was the highest ranked non-Italian rider.
