= 1947 Giro d'Italia =

Race details
- Dates: 24 May - 15 June 1947
- Stages: 20
- Distance: 3,843 km (2,388 mi)
- Winning time: 115h 55' 07"

Results
Jersey awarded to the overall winner	Winner	Fausto Coppi (ITA)	(Bianchi)
	Second	Gino Bartali (ITA)	(Legnano)
	Third	Giulio Bresci (ITA)	(Welter)
	Mountains	Gino Bartali (ITA)	(Legnano)
	Team	Welter	

The 1947 Giro d'Italia was the 30th edition of the Giro d'Italia, organized and sponsored by the newspaper La Gazzetta dello Sport. The race began on 24 May in Milan with a stage that stretched 190 km (118 mi) to Turin, finishing back in Milan on 15 June after a 278 km (173 mi) stage and a total distance covered of 3,843 km (2,388 mi).

The Giro was won by Fausto Coppi of the Bianchi team, with fellow Italians Gino Bartali and Giulio Bresci coming in second and third respectively.

== Teams ==
While in previous years, the Giro peloton was a mix of teams and groups, from 1947 on only professional teams could join. A total of twelve teams entered the 1947 Giro d'Italia. Each team sent a squad of seven riders, so the Giro began with a peloton of 84 cyclists. Out of the 84 riders that started this edition of the Giro d'Italia, a total of 50 riders made it to the finish in Milan.

The teams entering the race were:

- Arbos–Talbot
- Benotto
- Bianchi
- Cozzi-Silger
- Legnano
- Lygie
- Olmo
- Monterosa
- Viscontea
- Wally
- Welter
- Wilier Triestina

== Route and stages ==
Stage characteristics and results
Stage	Date	Course	Distance	Type	Winner
1	24 May	Milan to Turin	190 km (118 mi)	Plain stage	Renzo Zanazzi (ITA)
2	25 May	Turin to Genoa	206 km (128 mi)	Plain stage	Gino Bartali (ITA)
3	26 May	Genoa to Reggio Emilia	220 km (137 mi)	Stage with mountain(s)	Luciano Maggini (ITA)
4	27 May	Reggio Emilia to Prato	190 km (118 mi)	Stage with mountain(s)	Fausto Coppi (ITA)
	28 May	Rest day			
5a	29 May	Prato to Bagni di Casciana Terme	84 km (52 mi)	Plain stage	Luciano Maggini (ITA)
5b	29 May	Bagni di Casciana Terme to Florence	141 km (88 mi)	Plain stage	Renzo Zanazzi (ITA)
6	30 May	Florence to Perugia	161 km (100 mi)	Plain stage	Giordano Cottur (ITA)
7	31 May	Perugia to Rome	240 km (149 mi)	Stage with mountain(s)	Oreste Conte (ITA)
8	1 June	Rome to Naples	231 km (144 mi)	Plain stage	Fausto Coppi (ITA)
	2 June	Rest day			
9	3 June	Naples to Bari	288 km (179 mi)	Stage with mountain(s)	Elio Bertocchi (ITA)
10	4 June	Bari to Foggia	129 km (80 mi)	Plain stage	Mario Ricci (ITA)
11	5 June	Foggia to Pescara	223 km (139 mi)	Plain stage	Oreste Conte (ITA)
	6 June	Rest day			
12	7 June	Pescara to Cesenatico	267 km (166 mi)	Plain stage	Giovanni Corrieri (ITA)
13	8 June	Cesenatico to Padua	175 km (109 mi)	Plain stage	Antonio Bevilacqua (ITA)
14	9 June	Padua to Vittorio Veneto	132 km (82 mi)	Plain stage	Adolfo Leoni (ITA)
15	10 June	Vittorio Veneto to Pieve di Cadore	200 km (124 mi)	Stage with mountain(s)	Gino Bartali (ITA)
	11 June	Rest day			
16	12 June	Pieve di Cadore to Trento	194 km (121 mi)	Stage with mountain(s)	Fausto Coppi (ITA)
17	13 June	Trento to Brescia Sant'Eufemia	114 km (71 mi)	Plain stage	Adolfo Leoni (ITA)
18	14 June	Brescia Sant'Eufemia to Lugano (Switzerland)	180 km (112 mi)	Plain stage	Giulio Bresci (ITA)
19	15 June	Lugano (Switzerland) to Milan	278 km (173 mi)	Stage with mountain(s)	Adolfo Leoni (ITA)
	Total		3,843 km (2,388 mi)		

== Race overview ==
In the fifteenth stage, Bartali dismounted his bike to punch a spectator who shouted an anti-Catholic slur at him. He then continued to win the stage.

== Classification leadership ==
The leader of the general classification – calculated by adding the stage finish times of each rider – wore a pink jersey. This classification is the most important of the race, and its winner is considered as the winner of the Giro. There were no time bonuses in 1947.

In the mountains classification, the race organizers selected different mountains that the route crossed and awarded points to the five riders who crossed them first.

There was a black jersey (maglia nera) awarded to the rider placed last in the general classification. The classification was calculated in the same manner as the general classification.

The winner of the team classification was determined by adding the finish times of the best three cyclists per team together and the team with the lowest total time was the winner. If a team had fewer than three riders finish, they were not eligible for the classification.

The rows in the following table correspond to the jerseys awarded after that stage was run.

Classification leadership
Stage	Winner	General classification	Mountains classification	Last in General classification	Team classification
1	Renzo Zanazzi	Renzo Zanazzi	not awarded	Ernesto Ciardossino	Legnano
2	Gino Bartali	Renzo Zanazzi	not awarded	Armando Peverelli	Legnano
3	Luciano Maggini	Renzo Zanazzi	Giovanni Corrieri	?	Legnano
4	Fausto Coppi	Gino Bartali	Gino Bartali	Antonio Ausenda	Benotto
5a	Luciano Maggini	Gino Bartali	Gino Bartali	?	Benotto
5b	Renzo Zanazzi	Gino Bartali	Gino Bartali	?	Benotto
6	Giordano Cottur	Gino Bartali	Gino Bartali	Antonio Ausenda	Benotto
7	Oreste Conte	Gino Bartali	Gino Bartali	Antonio Ausenda	Benotto
8	Fausto Coppi	Gino Bartali	Gino Bartali	Antonio Ausenda	Benotto
9	Elio Bertocchi	Gino Bartali	Gino Bartali	Luigi Malabrocca	Welter
10	Mario Ricci	Gino Bartali	Gino Bartali	Luigi Malabrocca	Welter
11	Oreste Conte	Gino Bartali	Gino Bartali	Luigi Malabrocca	Welter
12	Giovanni Corrieri	Gino Bartali	Gino Bartali	Luigi Malabrocca	Welter
13	Antonio Bevilacqua	Gino Bartali	Gino Bartali	Riccardo Sarti	Welter
14	Adolfo Leoni	Gino Bartali	Gino Bartali	Luigi Malabrocca	Welter
15	Gino Bartali	Gino Bartali	Gino Bartali	Riccardo Sarti	Welter
16	Fausto Coppi	Fausto Coppi	Gino Bartali	?	Welter
17	Adolfo Leoni	Fausto Coppi	Gino Bartali	?	Welter
18	Giulio Bresci	Fausto Coppi	Gino Bartali	?	Welter
19	Adolfo Leoni	Fausto Coppi	Gino Bartali	Luigi Malabrocca	Welter
Final		Fausto Coppi	Gino Bartali	Luigi Malabrocca	Welter

== Final standings ==
Legend
A pink jersey	Denotes the winner of the General classification

=== General classification ===
Final general classification (1–10)
Rank	Name	Team	Time
1	Fausto Coppi (ITA)	Bianchi	115h 55' 07"
2	Gino Bartali (ITA)	Legnano	+ 1' 43"
3	Giulio Bresci (ITA)	Welter	+ 5' 54"
4	Ezio Cecchi (ITA)	Welter	+ 15' 01"
5	Sylvère Maes (BEL)	Olmo	+ 15' 06"
6	Alfredo Martini (ITA)	Welter	+ 19' 00"
7	Mario Vicini (ITA)	Bianchi	+ 30' 46"
8	Salvatore Crippa (ITA)	Lygie	+ 31' 05"
9	Fiorenzo Magni (ITA)	Viscontea	+ 34' 07"
10	Angelo Menon (ITA)	Lygie	+ 35' 49"

=== Mountains classification ===
Final mountains classification (1–10)
	Name	Team	Points
1	Gino Bartali (ITA)	Legnano	24
2	Fausto Coppi (ITA)	Bianchi	21
3	Giulio Bresci (ITA)	Welter	13
4	Giovanni Corrieri (ITA)	Viscontea	7
4	Sylvère Maes (BEL)	Olmo	7
6	Oreste Conte (ITA)	Benotto	5
6	Alfredo Martini (ITA)	Welter	5
6	Ezio Cecchi (ITA)	Welter	5
6	Luigi Casola (ITA)	Bianchi	5
10	Sergio Pagliazzi (ITA)	Cozzi-Silger	4
10	Adolfo Leoni (ITA)	Bianchi	4
10	Antonio Bevilacqua (ITA)	Lygie	4

=== Team classification ===
Final team classification (1-9)
	Team	Time
1	Welter	348h 25' 36"
2	Bianchi	+ 1h 10' 35"
3	Legnano	+ 1h 15' 14"
4	Viscontea	+ 1h 28' 23"
5	Lygie	+ 2h 15' 17"
6	Wally	+ 3h 38' 13"
7	Benotto	+ 3h 44' 28"
8	Arbos-Talbot	+ 4h 00' 41"
9	Wilier-Triestina	+ 5h 14' 43"

=== Minor awards ===
Coppi won the blue bracelet for winning the stage with the greatest time between the second placed rider. He managed to achieve a gap of 4' 24" during the stage from Pieve di Cadore to Trento, where he won by a margin of 4' 24". Coppi and Adolfo Leoni split the "premato veloce" classification which was given to the rider with the most stage wins. Leoni and Coppi both won three stages, while four riders won two stages.
