= 1951 Giro d'Italia =

Race details
- Dates: 19 May - 10 June 1951
- Stages: 20
- Distance: 4,153 km (2,581 mi)
- Winning time: 121h 11' 37"

Results
Jersey awarded to the overall winner	Winner	Fiorenzo Magni (ITA)	(Ganna)
	Second	Rik Van Steenbergen (BEL)	(Girardengo)
	Third	Ferdinand Kübler (SUI)	(Fréjus)
	Mountains	Louison Bobet (FRA)	(Bottecchia)
	Team	Taurea	

The 1951 Giro d'Italia was the 34th edition of the Giro d'Italia, one of cycling's Grand Tours. The Giro started off in Milan on 19 May with a 202 km (125.5 mi) flat stage and concluded back in Milan with a 172 km (106.9 mi) relatively flat mass-start stage on 10 June. Fourteen teams entered the race, which was won by Italian Fiorenzo Magni of the Ganna team. Second and third respectively were Belgian Rik Van Steenbergen and Swiss rider Ferdinand Kübler.

== Teams ==
A total of 14 teams were invited to participate in the 1951 Giro d'Italia. Each team sent a squad of seven riders, so the Giro began with a peloton of 98 cyclists. Italy had the most participants with 80, the foreign participation included Belgium (9), Switzerland (5), and France (4). Out of the 98 riders that started this edition of the Giro d'Italia, a total of 75 riders made it to the finish in Milan.

The teams entering the race were:

- Arbos
- Atala
- Bartali
- Benotto
- Bianchi
- Bottecchia
- Fréjus
- Girardengo
- Ganna
- Guerra
- Legnano
- Stucchi
- Taurea
- Wilier Triestina

== Pre-race favorites ==
It was widely believed that the competing field was very international than in years past at the Giro and it contained all the great cycling champions at the moment. Reigning champion Hugo Koblet (Guerra) entered the race to defend his crown. Koblet did not have a successful early season. Fausto Coppi and his Bianchi team were regarded as the strongest team. Coppi, who had broken his collarbone earlier in the 1951 season during the Milano–Torino, had recently shown his strength as he finished second overall at the Tour de Romandie. Nouelliste Valaisan wrote the even with Gino Bartali (Bartali) and Fiorenzo Magni's (Ganna) participation, that Coppi was the only hope for an Italian victory. Bartali was seen as a rider that could surprise, but not win the race. His most notable result was a second-place finish at La Flèche Wallonne. Magni was viewed as dangerous prospect; he won Milano–Torino and his third straight Tour of Flanders in April. As a whole, the "Big Three" of Italian cycling were seen as the only Italian riders with legitimate chances to win the title.

France's Louison Bobet (Bottecchia) was viewed as a strong candidate and in strong form. Bobet had placed third at the previous year's Tour de France, entered as the French national road race champion, and had won the Milan–San_Remo earlier that season. Swiss rider Fritz Schär (Arbos) was seen as a candidate to win the race as well. Frejus' Ferdinand Kübler, who won the 1950 Tour de France, participated as well with the hopes of winning the general classification. Kübler had a successful start to the 1951 campaign with victories at La Flèche Wallonne and Liège–Bastogne–Liège. Nouvelliste Valaisan speculated Kübler would not try to defend his Tour title in order to give the Giro his best effort. Coppi, Kubler, and Bobet were named among several media outlets to be the top contenders to win the race. The Girardengo team was viewed to be very strong, in part due to the fact the team possessed three riders with a history of winning the world championship men's road race: Marcel Kint (1938), Briek Schotte (1948 & 1950), and Rik Van Steenbergen (1949). Schotte finished second at the 1948 Tour de France (Bartali won the race overall).

== Route and stages ==
The route was revealed on 5 February 1951. There were three rest days that divided the twenty stages. The route averaged 200 km (124 mi) per stage. An alternate route through the Dolomites was created by the organizers in the chances that the Pordoi Pass, Passo Rolle, and the Falzarego Pass were not cross-able. The race did exit Italy to enter Switzerland.

There were some rule changes prior to the 1951 edition. Due to some complaints regarding Koblet's win the year prior, which some credited due to the time bonuses he had garnered from intermediate sprints, summits, and stage finishes, all time bonuses were removed from the race. In addition, the intermediate sprint classification was removed as a whole. Nouvelliste Valaisan felt the changes would make the cyclists lose interest. In addition, rules were changed regarding flat tires, riders would have to change the inner tube rather than change wheels.

The opening stages and the stages between the second and third rest days were thought to be easy, while the last four stages would be the hardest. A writer for Nouvelliste Valaisan felt the Giro had begun to open more to international riders, it has drawn the attention of the Tour de France organizers. At the time it was regarded as one of the top three stage races in the world, along with the Tour de France and the Tour de Suisse.

Stage characteristics and results
Stage	Date	Course	Distance	Type	Winner
1	19 May	Milan to Turin	202 km (126 mi)	Plain stage	Rik Van Steenbergen (BEL)
2	20 May	Turin to Alassio	202 km (126 mi)	Stage with mountain(s)	Antonio Bevilacqua (ITA)
3	21 May	Alassio to Genoa	252 km (157 mi)	Stage with mountain(s)	Rodolfo Falzoni (ITA)
4	22 May	Genoa to Florence	265 km (165 mi)	Stage with mountain(s)	Guido De Santi (ITA)
5	23 May	Florence to Perugia	192 km (119 mi)	Plain stage	Pietro Giudici (ITA)
	24 May	Rest day			
6	25 May	Perugia to Terni	81 km (50 mi)	Individual time trial	Fausto Coppi (ITA)
7	26 May	Terni to Rome	290 km (180 mi)	Stage with mountain(s)	Angelo Menon (ITA)
8	27 May	Rome to Naples	234 km (145 mi)	Plain stage	Luigi Casola (ITA)
9	28 May	Naples to Foggia	181 km (112 mi)	Stage with mountain(s)	Giovanni Corrieri (ITA)
10	29 May	Foggia to Pescara	311 km (193 mi)	Stage with mountain(s)	Giuseppe Minardi (ITA)
	30 May	Rest day			
11	31 May	Pescara to Rimini	246 km (153 mi)	Plain stage	Serafino Biagioni (ITA)
12	1 June	Rimini to San Marino	24 km (15 mi)	Individual time trial	Giancarlo Astrua (ITA)
13	2 June	Rimini to Bologna	249 km (155 mi)	Plain stage	Luciano Maggini (ITA)
14	3 June	Bologna to Brescia	220 km (137 mi)	Plain stage	Adolfo Leoni (ITA)
15	4 June	Brescia to Venice	188 km (117 mi)	Plain stage	Rik Van Steenbergen (BEL)
16	5 June	Venice to Trieste	182 km (113 mi)	Plain stage	Luciano Frosini (ITA)
	6 June	Rest day			
17	7 June	Trieste to Cortina d'Ampezzo	255 km (158 mi)	Stage with mountain(s)	Louison Bobet (FRA)
18	8 June	Cortina d'Ampezzo to Bolzano	242 km (150 mi)	Stage with mountain(s)	Fausto Coppi (ITA)
19	9 June	Bolzano to Sankt Moritz (Switzerland)	166 km (103 mi)	Stage with mountain(s)	Hugo Koblet (SUI)
20	10 June	Sankt Moritz (Switzerland) to Milan	172 km (107 mi)	Plain stage	Antonio Bevilacqua (ITA)
	Total		4,153 km (2,581 mi)		

== Classification leadership ==
The leader of the general classification – calculated by adding the stage finish times of each rider – wore a pink jersey. This classification is the most important of the race, and its winner is considered as the winner of the Giro. There were no time bonuses in 1951.

Two additional jerseys were in use. The green jersey was given to the best foreign cyclist in the general classification; it was won by Belgian Rik Van Steenbergen. The white jersey was given to the best cyclist riding with a licence for independents; this was won by Arrigo Padovan.

In the mountains classification, the race organizers selected different mountains that the route crossed and awarded points to the five riders who crossed them first. The winner of the team classification was determined by adding the finish times of the best three cyclists per team per stage together and the team with the lowest total time was the winner. If a team had fewer than three riders finish, they were not eligible for the classification.

There was a black jersey (maglia nera) awarded to the rider placed last in the general classification. The classification was calculated in the same manner as the general classification.

Unlike the year before, there was no intermediate sprint classification in 1951.

The rows in the following table correspond to the jerseys awarded after that stage was run.

Classification leadership by stage
Stage	Winner	General classification	Best foreign rider	Best independent rider	Mountains classification	Last in General classification	Team classification
1	Rik Van Steenbergen	Rik Van Steenbergen	Rik Van Steenbergen	Luciano Frosini	not awarded	?	Girardengo
2	Antonio Bevilacqua	Fiorenzo Magni	Raymond Impanis	Silvio Pedroni	Antonio Bevilacqua	Marcel Dupont	Girardengo
3	Rodolfo Falzoni	Fiorenzo Magni	Rik Van Steenbergen	Silvio Pedroni	Antonio Bevilacqua & Luciano Pezzi	Marcel Dupont	Girardengo
4	Guido De Santi	Fiorenzo Magni	Rik Van Steenbergen	Silvio Pedroni	Alfredo Pasotti	Marcel Dupont	Legnano
5	Pietro Giudici	Fritz Schär	Fritz Schär	Silvio Pedroni	Alfredo Pasotti	Marcel Dupont	Arbos
6	Fausto Coppi	Fritz Schär	Fritz Schär	Elio Brasola	Alfredo Pasotti	Marcel Dupont	Fréjus
7	Angelo Menon	Rik Van Steenbergen	Rik Van Steenbergen	Elio Brasola	Alfredo Pasotti	Marcel Dupont	Fréjus
8	Luigi Casola	Fiorenzo Magni	Ferdinand Kübler	Donato Zampini	Alfredo Pasotti	Marcel Dupont	Fréjus
9	Giovanni Corrieri	Fiorenzo Magni	Ferdinand Kübler	Donato Zampini	Alfredo Pasotti	Bartello Bof	Fréjus
10	Giuseppe Minardi	Fiorenzo Magni	Ferdinand Kübler	Donato Zampini	Alfredo Pasotti	Giovanni Pinarello	Fréjus
11	Serafino Biagioni	Fiorenzo Magni	Ferdinand Kübler	Donato Zampini	Alfredo Pasotti	Martin Metzger	Fréjus
12	Giancarlo Astrua	Giancarlo Astrua	Ferdinand Kübler	Donato Zampini	Alfredo Pasotti	Martin Metzger	Fréjus
13	Luciano Maggini	Rik Van Steenbergen	Rik Van Steenbergen	Donato Zampini	Alfredo Pasotti	Martin Metzger	Atala
14	Adolfo Leoni	Rik Van Steenbergen	Rik Van Steenbergen	Donato Zampini	Alfredo Pasotti	Martin Metzger	Atala
15	Rik Van Steenbergen	Rik Van Steenbergen	Rik Van Steenbergen	Donato Zampini	Alfredo Pasotti	Martin Metzger	Atala
16	Luciano Frosini	Rik Van Steenbergen	Rik Van Steenbergen	Arrigo Padovan	Alfredo Pasotti	Martin Metzger	Atala
17	Louison Bobet	Rik Van Steenbergen	Rik Van Steenbergen	Arrigo Padovan	Alfredo Pasotti	Martin Metzger	Fréjus
18	Fausto Coppi	Fiorenzo Magni	Rik Van Steenbergen	Elio Brasola	Louison Bobet	Martin Metzger	Atala
19	Hugo Koblet	Fiorenzo Magni	Rik Van Steenbergen	Arrigo Padovan	Louison Bobet	?	Taurea
20	Antonio Bevilacqua	Fiorenzo Magni	Rik Van Steenbergen	Arrigo Padovan	Louison Bobet	Giovanni Pinarello	Taurea
Final		Fiorenzo Magni	Rik Van Steenbergen	Arrigo Padovan	Louison Bobet	Giovanni Pinarello	Taurea

== Final standings ==
Legend
A pink jersey	Denotes the winner of the General classification
A white jersey	Denotes the best independent rider
A green jersey	Denotes the best foreign rider

=== General classification ===
Final general classification (1–10)
Rank	Name	Team	Time
1	Fiorenzo Magni (ITA)	Ganna	121h 11' 37"
2	Rik Van Steenbergen (BEL)	Girardengo	+ 1' 46"
3	Ferdinand Kübler (SUI)	Fréjus	+ 2' 36"
4	Fausto Coppi (ITA)	Bianchi	+ 4' 04"
5	Giancarlo Astrua (ITA)	Taurea	+ 4' 07"
6	Hugo Koblet (SUI)	Guerra	+ 6' 05"
7	Louison Bobet (FRA)	Bottecchia	+ 13' 07"
8	Arrigo Padovan (ITA)	Atala	+ 14' 41"
9	Vincenzo Rossello (ITA)	Taurea	+ 14' 49"
10	Gino Bartali (ITA)	Bartali	+ 21' 12"

=== Independent rider classification ===
Final Independent rider classification (1–10)
Rank	Name	Time
1	Arrigo Padovan (ITA)	121h 26' 18"
2	Elio Brasola (ITA)	+ 10' 51"
3	Bruno Pasquini (ITA)	+ 13' 50"
4	Bruno Pontisso (ITA)	+ 16' 18"
5	Donato Zampini (ITA)	+ 18' 25"
6	Dino Rossi (ITA)	+ 19' 09"
7	Rinaldo Moresco (ITA)	+ 24' 25"
8	Vittorio Rossello (ITA)	+ 24' 10"
9	Pietro Guidici (ITA)	+ 33' 57"
10	Ugo Fondelli (ITA)	+ 39' 01"

=== Foreign rider classification ===
Final Foreign rider classification (1–4)
Rank	Name	Team	Time
1	Rik Van Steenbergen (BEL)	Girardengo	121h 13' 23"
2	Ferdinand Kübler (SUI)	Fréjus	+ 50"
3	Hugo Koblet (SUI)	Guerra	+ 4' 19"
4	Louison Bobet (FRA)	Bottecchia	+ 7' 19"

=== Mountains classification ===
Final mountains classification (1–5)
Rank	Name	Team	Points
1	Louis Bobet (FRA)	Bottecchia	29
2	Fausto Coppi (ITA)	Bianchi	27
3	Alfredo Pasotti (ITA)	Wilier	19
4	Gino Bartali (ITA)	Bartali	17
5	Giovanni Roma (ITA)	Bottecchia	12

=== Team classification ===
Final team classification (1)
	Team	Time
1	Taurea	?
