= Team classification in the Giro d'Italia =

Road cycling classification

Team classification
- Sport: Road Cycling
- Competition: Giro d'Italia
- Awarded for: Fastest team
- Local name: Trofeo Fast Team (in Italian)

History
- First award: 1930
- Editions: 91 (as of 2025)
- First winner: Bianchi
- Most wins: Legnano (5 times)
- Most recent: UAE Team Emirates XRG

The Team classification in the Giro d'Italia, also known as the Trofeo Fast Team, is a prize that is contested in the Giro d'Italia. It has been awarded since the race's inception. In more recent editions the classification is calculated by adding up the top three riders' times from each team for each stage, and then the team with the lowest total time is the leader of the classification. In case of a tie, the teams are separated by the sum of the places obtained by their three best riders at the finish.

There had been team classifications in 1912 and 1913, but the definitive introduction of the teams classification was in 1930.

== Winners ==
=== Team classification ===
Team classification winners

Year	Team
1930	Bianchi
1931	Legnano–Hutchinson
1932	Legnano–Hutchinson
1933	Legnano–Clément
1934	Gloria
1935	Fréjus
1936	Legnano–Wolsit
1937	Fréjus
1938	Gloria–Ambrosiana
1939	Fréjus
1940	Gloria
1946	Benotto
1947	Welter
1948	Wilier Triestina
1949	Wilier Triestina
1950	Fréjus–Superga
1951	Taurea
1952	Bianchi–Pirelli
1953	Ganna–Ursus
1954	Girardengo
1955	Atala
1956	Atala
1957	Legnano
1958	Carpano
1959	Atala–Pirelli–Lygi

Year	Team
1960	Ignis
1961	Faema
1962	Faema
1963	Carpano
1964	Saint-Raphaël–Gitane–Dunlop
1965	Salvarani
1966	Molteni
1967	Kas–Kaskol
1968	Faema
1969	Faema
1970	Faemino–Faema
1971	Molteni
1972	Molteni
1973	Molteni
1974	Kas–Kaskol
1975	Brooklyn
1976	Brooklyn
1977	Flandria–Velda–Latina Assicurazioni
1978	Bianchi–Faema
1979	Sanson–Luxor TV–Campagnolo
1980	Bianchi–Piaggio
1981	Bianchi–Piaggio
1982	Bianchi–Piaggio
1983	Gemeaz Cusin
1984	Renault–Elf

Year	Team
1985	Alpilatte–Cierre
1986	Supermercati Brianzoli
1987	Panasonic–Isostar
1988	Carrera Jeans–Vagabond
1989	Fagor–MBK
1990	ONCE
1991	Carrera Jeans–Tassoni
1992	GB–MG Maglificio
1993	Lampre–Polti
1994	Carrera Jeans–Tassoni
1995	Gewiss–Ballan
1996	Carrera Jeans–Tassoni
1997	Kelme–Costa Blanca
1998	Mapei–Bricobi
1999	Vitalicio Seguros
2000	Mapei–Quick-Step
2001	Alessio
2002	Alessio
2003	Lampre
2004	Saeco
2005	Liquigas–Bianchi
2006	Phonak
2007	Saunier Duval–Prodir
2008	CSF Group–Navigare
2009	Astana

Year	Team
2010	Liquigas–Doimo
2011	Astana
2012	Lampre–ISD
2013	Team Sky
2014	Ag2r–La Mondiale
2015	Astana
2016	Astana
2017	Movistar Team
2018	Team Sky
2019	Movistar Team
2020	INEOS Grenadiers
2021	INEOS Grenadiers
2022	Team Bahrain Victorious
2023	Team Bahrain Victorious
2024	Decathlon–AG2R La Mondiale
2025	UAE Team Emirates XRG
2026	Visma–Lease a Bike

=== Team points classification (1993–2017) ===
Team points classification

Year	Team	Points
1993	Ariostea	531
1994	Team Polti–Vaporetto	543
1995	Gewiss–Ballan	631
1996	Panaria–Vinavil	468
1997	Saeco–Estro	399
1998	Team Polti	479
1999	Team Polti	1243
2000	Fassa Bortolo	456
2001	Fassa Bortolo	370
2002	Alessio	360
2003	Fassa Bortolo	561
2004	Alessio–Bianchi	384

Year	Team	Points
2005	Davitamon–Lotto	347
2006	Phonak	323
2007	Lampre–Fondital	408
2008	Liquigas	360
2009	Team Columbia–High Road	400
2010	Liquigas–Doimo	412
2011	Lampre–ISD	338
2012	Garmin–Barracuda	363
2013	Movistar Team	281
2014	Omega Pharma–Quick-Step	327
2015	Astana	640
2016	Etixx–Quick-Step	506
2017	Quick-Step Floors	516

== See also ==
- Team classification in the Tour de France
- Team classification in the Vuelta a España
