= 1948 Giro d'Italia =

Race details
- Dates: 15 May - 6 June 1948
- Stages: 19
- Distance: 4,164 km (2,587 mi)
- Winning time: 124h 51' 52"

Results
Jersey awarded to the overall winner	Winner	Fiorenzo Magni (ITA)	(Wilier Triestina)
	Second	Ezio Cecchi (ITA)	(Cimatti)
	Third	Giordano Cottur (ITA)	(Wilier Triestina)
	Mountains	Fausto Coppi (ITA)	(Bianchi)
	Team	Wilier Triestina	

The 1948 Giro d'Italia was the 31st edition of the Giro d'Italia, organized and sponsored by the newspaper La Gazzetta dello Sport. The race began on 15 May in Milan with a stage that stretched 190 km (118 mi) to Turin, finishing back in Milan on 6 June after a 231 km (144 mi) stage and a total distance covered of 4,164 km (2,587 mi). The race was won by the Italian rider Fiorenzo Magni of the Wilier Triestina team, with fellow Italians Ezio Cecchi and Giordano Cottur coming in second and third respectively.

== Teams ==
A total of eleven teams entered the 1948 Giro d'Italia. Each team sent a squad of seven riders, so the Giro began with a peloton of 77 cyclists. Out of the 77 riders that started this edition of the Giro d'Italia, a total of 44 riders made it to the finish in Milan.

The teams entering the race were:

- Atala
- Arbos
- Benotto
- Bianchi
- Cimatti
- Legnano
- Lygie
- Peugeot
- Viani-C.R.A.L. Imperia
- Viscontea
- Wilier Triestina

== Route and stages ==
Race organizer and newspaper La Gazzetta dello Sport released the preliminary route for the Giro d'Italia on 27 October 1947. The race was originally planned to start on 22 May and finish on 13 June, while covering 3,715 km (2,308 mi) over nineteen stages.

Stage results
Stage	Date	Course	Distance	Type	Winner
1	15 May	Milan to Turin	190 km (118 mi)	Plain stage	Giordano Cottur (ITA)
2	16 May	Turin to Genoa	226 km (140 mi)	Plain stage	Mario Ricci (ITA)
3	17 May	Genoa to Parma	243 km (151 mi)	Stage with mountain(s)	Luciano Maggini (ITA)
4	18 May	Parma to Viareggio	266 km (165 mi)	Plain stage	Luigi Casola (ITA)
	19 May	Rest day			
5	20 May	Viareggio to Siena	165 km (103 mi)	Plain stage	Adolfo Leoni (ITA)
6	21 May	Siena to Rome	256 km (159 mi)	Plain stage	Luigi Casola (ITA)
7	22 May	Rome to Pescara	230 km (143 mi)	Stage with mountain(s)	Antonio Bevilacqua (ITA)
8	23 May	Pescara to Bari	347 km (216 mi)	Plain stage	Adolfo Leoni (ITA)
	24 May	Rest day			
9	25 May	Bari to Naples	306 km (190 mi)	Stage with mountain(s)	Nedo Logli (ITA)
10	26 May	Naples to Fiuggi	184 km (114 mi)	Plain stage	Italo De Zan (ITA)
11	27 May	Fiuggi to Perugia	265 km (165 mi)	Plain stage	Désiré Keteleer (BEL)
	28 May	Rest day			
12	29 May	Perugia to Florence	169 km (105 mi)	Plain stage	Oreste Conte (ITA)
13	30 May	Florence to Bologna	194 km (121 mi)	Stage with mountain(s)	Bruno Pasquini (ITA)
14	31 May	Bologna to Udine	278 km (173 mi)	Plain stage	Oreste Conte (ITA)
15	1 June	Udine to Auronzo di Cadore	125 km (78 mi)	Stage with mountain(s)	Vincenzo Rossello (ITA)
	2 June	Rest day			
16	3 June	Auronzo di Cadore to Cortina d'Ampezzo	90 km (56 mi)	Stage with mountain(s)	Fausto Coppi (ITA)
17	4 June	Cortina d'Ampezzo to Trento	160 km (99 mi)	Stage with mountain(s)	Fausto Coppi (ITA)
18	5 June	Trento to Brescia	239 km (149 mi)	Plain stage	Elio Bertocchi (ITA)
19	6 June	Brescia to Milan	231 km (144 mi)	Plain stage	Fiorenzo Magni (ITA)
	Total		4,164 km (2,587 mi)		

== Race overview ==
During stage 9 from Bari to Naples, Magni –who was down nine minutes at the time– joined the day's breakaway.

During the Giro, the French and Belgian teams left the race because they thought it was made impossible for foreign riders to ride the Giro. When the leader Magni was punished with only two minutes after being pushed up a mountain, Fausto Coppi and his Bianchi team also left the race out of protest. As a result, only forty riders finished the Giro. Stage seventeen featured several climbs including the Pordoi Pass. Coppi won the stage, but Magni–who had a reputation for struggling on big climbs–finished in time to retain the lead. It was discovered that Magni had been helped up the Pordoi, while some state he was pushed by spectators others say he was pulled by a car. Coppi and Bianchi requested Magni to be thrown out. As there were no photos, the race jury had to go based on testimonies. It was officially declared that the pushing Magni received was planned. The punishment was a two-minute penalty in the general classification, which still allowed him to remain in the lead. Coppi and his team decided to withdraw after that decision.

== Classification leadership ==
The leader of the general classification – calculated by adding the stage finish times of each rider – wore a pink jersey. This classification is the most important of the race, and its winner is considered as the winner of the Giro. There were no time bonuses in the 1948 Giro.

In the mountains classification, the race organizers selected different mountains that the route crossed and awarded points to the five riders who crossed them first. The mountains classification was finalized after the last mountain, riders did not need to finish the Giro to be classified in this classification.

The winner of the team classification was determined by adding the finish times of the best three cyclists per team together and the team with the lowest total time was the winner.If a team had fewer than three riders finish, they were not eligible for the classification.

There was a black jersey (maglia nera) awarded to the rider placed last in the general classification. The classification was calculated in the same manner as the general classification.

The prize money for the winner of the race was one million lire. The prize money increased to one million this year because Totip, a horse race betting company, sponsored the race.

The rows in the following table correspond to the jerseys awarded after that stage was run.

Classification leadership
Stage	Winner	General classification	Mountains classification	Last in General classification	Team classification
1	Giordano Cottur	Giordano Cottur	not awarded	?	Wilier-Triestina
2	Mario Ricci	Giordano Cottur	not awarded	Antonio Covolo	Wilier-Triestina
3	Luciano Maggini	Giordano Cottur	Ezio Cecchi	Enzo Bellini	Wilier-Triestina
4	Luigi Casola	Giordano Cottur	Ezio Cecchi	Antonio Covolo	Wilier-Triestina
5	Adolfo Leoni	Giordano Cottur	Ezio Cecchi	Antonio Covolo	Wilier-Triestina
6	Luigi Casola	Giordano Cottur	Ezio Cecchi	Antonio Covolo	Wilier-Triestina
7	Antonio Bevilacqua	Giordano Cottur	Fausto Coppi	?	Wilier-Triestina
8	Adolfo Leoni	Giordano Cottur	Fausto Coppi	?	Wilier-Triestina
9	Nedo Logli	Vito Ortelli	Ezio Cecchi	Aldo Bini	Wilier-Triestina
10	Italo De Zan	Vito Ortelli	Ezio Cecchi	Aldo Bini	Arbos
11	Désiré Keteleer	Vito Ortelli	Ezio Cecchi	Valeriano Zanazzi	Arbos
12	Oreste Conte	Vito Ortelli	Ezio Cecchi	Valeriano Zanazzi	Arbos
13	Bruno Pasquini	Vito Ortelli	Ezio Cecchi & Fausto Coppi	Prosper Depredomme	Arbos
14	Oreste Conte	Fiorenzo Magni	Ezio Cecchi & Fausto Coppi	?	Arbos
15	Vincenzo Rossello	Ezio Cecchi	Ezio Cecchi	?	Arbos
16	Fausto Coppi	Ezio Cecchi	Fausto Coppi	?	Arbos
17	Fausto Coppi	Fiorenzo Magni	Fausto Coppi	Aldo Bini	Wilier-Triestina
18	Elio Bertocchi	Fiorenzo Magni	Fausto Coppi	Aldo Bini	Wilier-Triestina
19	Fiorenzo Magni	Fiorenzo Magni	Fausto Coppi	Aldo Bini	Wilier-Triestina
Final		Fiorenzo Magni	Fausto Coppi	Aldo Bini	Wilier Triestina

== Final standings ==
Legend
A pink jersey	Denotes the winner of the General classification

=== General classification ===
Final general classification (1–10)
Rank	Name	Team	Time
1	Fiorenzo Magni (ITA)	Wilier Triestina	125h 51' 52"
2	Ezio Cecchi (ITA)	Cimatti	+ 11"
3	Giordano Cottur (ITA)	Wilier Triestina	+ 2' 37"
4	Vito Ortelli (ITA)	Atala	s.t.
5	Primo Volpi (ITA)	Arbos	+ 8' 24"
6	Angelo Brignole (ITA)	Arbos	+ 9' 14"
7	Giulio Bresci (ITA)	Wilier Triestina	+ 9' 17"
8	Gino Bartali (ITA)	Legnano	+ 11' 52"
9	Serafino Biagioni (ITA)	Viani Cral Imperia	+ 15' 05"
10	Alfredo Martini (ITA)	Wilier Triestina	+ 18' 22"

=== Mountains classification ===
Final mountains classification (1–9)
	Name	Team	Points
1	Fausto Coppi (ITA)	Bianchi	25
2	Ezio Cecchi (ITA)	Cimatti	16
3	Gino Bartali (ITA)	Legnano	14
4	Vito Ortelli (ITA)	Atala	12
5	Giordano Cottur (ITA)	Wilier-Triestina	9
6	Serafino Biagioni (ITA)	Viani-C.R.A.L. Imperia	8
7	Primo Volpi (ITA)	Arbos	6
8	Vincenzo Rossello (ITA)	Legnano	5
9	Aldo Baito (ITA)	Viscontea	4
9	Luigi Casola (ITA)	Cimatti	4
9	Alfredo Martini (ITA)	Wilier-Triestina	4

=== Team classification ===
Final team classification (1-8)
	Team	Time
1	Wilier Triestina	374h 47' 30"
2	Arbos	+ 28' 30"
3	Legnano	+ 1h 40' 07"
4	Viani-C.R.A.L. Imperia	+ 2h 04' 25"
5	Benotto	+ 2h 56' 36"
6	Atala	+ 3h 02' 43"
7	Viscontea	+ 4h 40' 14"
8	Cimatti	+ 5h 40' 45"

== Aftermath ==
The Italian cycling federation gave Coppi a suspension of one month because he refused to finish the Giro. After being caught cheating, Magni was the subject of the tifosi's animosity, he was frequently booed and writing on the road included the phrase Abbasso Magni (English: Down with Magni). After winning the final stage into Milan's Vignorelli Velodrome, the crowd's behavior (whistles, boos, and anti–Magni banners) reduced him to tears. The Communist Mayor of Prato sent Magni a telegram congratulating him on the victory, stating that his victory brought "honor to [their] city." Later in his life, Magni said that the telegram pleased him greatly.
