= 1951 Milan–San Remo =

Race details
- Dates: 19 March 1951
- Stages: 1
- Distance: 282 km (175 mi)
- Winning time: 7h 30' 23"

Results
	Winner	Louison Bobet (FRA)
	Second	Pierre Barbotin (FRA)
	Third	Loretto Petrucci (ITA)

The 1951 Milan–San Remo was the 42nd edition of the Milan–San Remo cycle race and was held on 19 March 1951. The race started in Milan and finished in San Remo. The race was won by Louison Bobet.

== General classification ==
Final general classification

Rank	Rider	Time
1	Louison Bobet (FRA)	7h 30' 23"
2	Pierre Barbotin (FRA)	+ 0"
3	Loretto Petrucci (ITA)	+ 3' 19"
4	Angelo Menon (ITA)	+ 3' 30"
5	Raymond Impanis (BEL)	+ 3' 35"
6	Rodolfo Falzoni (ITA)	+ 5' 14"
7	Sergio Maggini (ITA)	+ 5' 14"
8	Alain Moineau (FRA)	+ 5' 14"
9	Danilo Barozzi (ITA)	+ 5' 14"
10	Lido Sartini (ITA)	+ 5' 14"
