= Mario Gestri =

Italian cyclist

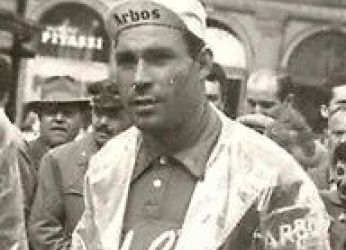

Personal information
- Born: 11 February 1924 Tizzana, Quarrata, Italy
- Died: 4 December 1953 (aged 29) Montecatini Terme, Italy

Cycling career
- Sport: Cycling
- Discipline: Road
- Role: Rider

Professional teams
- 1950–1951: Bartali
- 1952: Ganna–Ursus
- 1952: Tebag
- 1953: Arbos

Major wins
- Grand Tours Giro d'Italia Maglia Nera classification (1950)

Mario Gestri (11 February 1924 – 4 December 1953) was an Italian road cyclist.

Gestri finished last at the 1950 Giro d'Italia, earning the Maglia nera and competed in three other editions of the race. He continued racing into 1953, where he found moderate success. He died in 1953 in a motorcycle accident.
