= Alberto Ghirardi =

Italian cyclist (1921–1987)

Personal information
- Born: 5 May 1921
- Died: 5 December 1987 (aged 66)

Cycling career
- Sport: Cycling
- Role: Rider

Alberto Ghirardi (5 May 1921 – 5 December 1987) was an Italian racing cyclist. He rode in the 1950 Tour de France.
