= Stucchi (cycling team) =

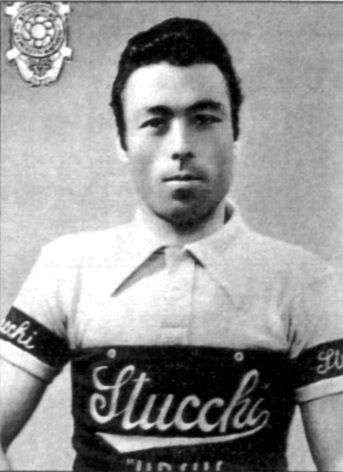
- Luigi Malabrocca

Team information
- Registered: Italy
- Founded: 1909
- Disbanded: 1951
- Discipline: Road
- Bicycles: Stucchi

Team name history
- 1909 1910, 1912–1913 1914 1915–1918 1919–1920 1921 1948–1949 1950–1951: Stucchi–Pirelli; Stucchi; Stucchi–Dunlop; Stucchi; Stucchi–Dunlop; Stucchi–Pirelli; Stucchi; Stucchi–Ursus

Stucchi was an Italian professional cycling team that existed in part between 1909 and 1951. Its main sponsor was Italian company Stucchi & Co. The team had two riders that won the general classification of the Giro d'Italia, Alfonso Calzolari in 1914 and Costante Girardengo in 1919.
