= Guerra (cycling team) =

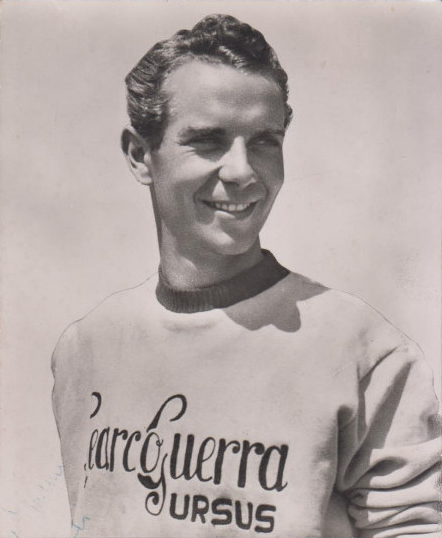
- Hugo Koblet c. 1952–1954

Team information
- Registered: Italy
- Founded: 1949
- Disbanded: 1954
- Discipline: Road
- Bicycles: Guerra

Team name history
- 1949 1950–1952 1953 1954: Guerra; Guerra–Ursus; Guerra; Guerra–Ursus

Guerra was an Italian professional cycling team that existed from 1949 to 1954. Whilst with Guerra, Hugo Koblet won the general classification of the 1950 Giro d'Italia.
