= Rodolfo Falzoni =

Italian cyclist

Personal information
- Born: 10 September 1925
- Died: 18 March 2002 (aged 76)

Cycling career
- Sport: Cycling
- Role: Rider

Rodolfo Falzoni (10 September 1925 – 18 March 2002) was an Italian racing cyclist. He won stage 3 of the 1951 Giro d'Italia in Milan, Italy.
