= Luciano Frosini =

Italian cyclist

Personal information
- Born: 27 December 1927 Pontedera, Italy
- Died: 16 June 2017 (aged 89) Follonica, Italy

Cycling career
- Sport: Cycling
- Role: Rider

Luciano Frosini (27 December 1927 – 16 June 2017) was an Italian racing cyclist. He won stage 16 of the 1951 Giro d'Italia.
