= Virgilio Salimbeni =

Italian cyclist

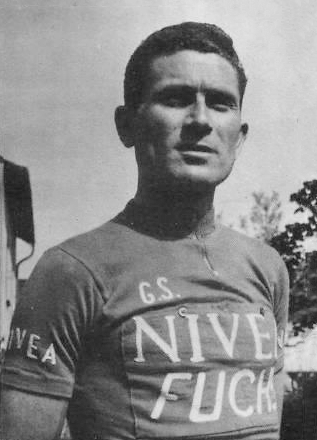
- Virgilio Salimbeni in 1954

Personal information
- Born: 27 May 1922 Lainate, Italy
- Died: 30 October 2011 (aged 91) Seveso, Italy

Cycling career
- Sport: Cycling
- Role: Rider

Virgilio Salimbeni (27 May 1922 – 30 October 2011) was an Italian racing cyclist. He won the Coppa Bernocchi in 1948 and Giro dell'Emilia in 1949, and rode the Tour de France in 1948, 1950 and 1951 and Giro d'Italia in 1948.
