= Vittorio Magni =

Italian cyclist

Personal information
- Born: 8 December 1918 Fucecchio, Italy
- Died: 4 April 2010 (aged 91) Milan, Italy

Cycling career
- Sport: Cycling
- Role: Rider

Vittorio Magni (8 December 1918 – 4 April 2010) was an Italian racing cyclist. He rode in the 1948 Tour de France.
