= Franco Fanti =

Italian cyclist (1924–2007)

Personal information
- Born: 21 March 1924 Colorina, Italy
- Died: 20 September 2007 (aged 83) Cantù, Italy

Cycling career
- Sport: Cycling

Franco Fanti (21 March 1924 – 20 September 2007) was an Italian cyclist. He competed in the individual and team road race events at the 1948 Summer Olympics.
