= Ettore Milano =

Italian cyclist

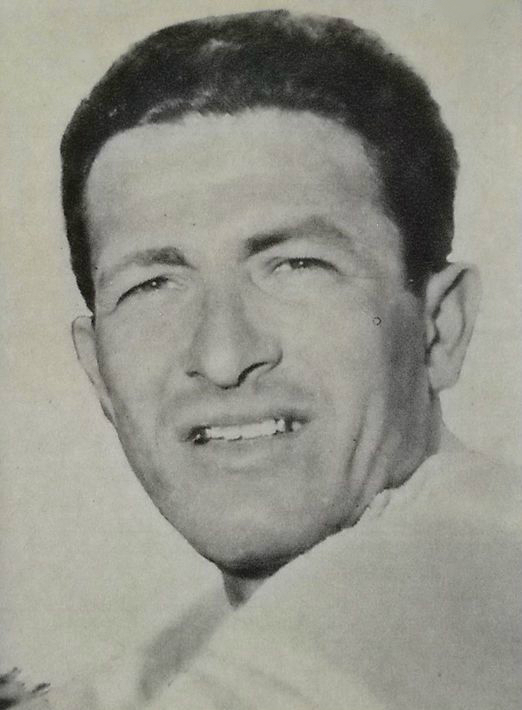

Personal information
- Born: 26 July 1925
- Died: 21 October 2011 (aged 86) Novi Ligure, Italy

Cycling career
- Sport: Cycling
- Role: Rider

Ettore Milano (26 July 1925 – 21 October 2011) was an Italian racing cyclist. He rode in the Tour de France in 1949, 1950 and 1951, placing 51st–52nd. In 1953, he won two stages of the Giro d'Italia.
