= Franco Franchi (cyclist) =

Italian cyclist

Personal information
- Born: 1 September 1923 Poggio Morello, Italy
- Died: 29 October 2018 (aged 95)

Cycling career
- Sport: Cycling
- Role: Rider

Franco Franchi (1 September 1923 – 29 October 2018) was an Italian racing cyclist. He won stage 5 of the 1950 Giro d'Italia. Franchi died on 29 October 2018 at the age of 95.
