= Adolfo Grosso =

Italian cyclist (1927–1980)

Personal information
- Born: 17 December 1927
- Died: 28 July 1980 (aged 52)

Cycling career
- Sport: Cycling
- Role: Rider

Adolfo Grosso (17 December 1927 – 28 July 1980) was an Italian racing cyclist. He won stage 18 of the 1954 Giro d'Italia.
