= Fiorenzo Crippa =

Italian cyclist

Personal information
- Born: 24 January 1926
- Died: 24 September 2017 (aged 91)

Cycling career
- Sport: Cycling
- Role: Rider

Fiorenzo Crippa (24 January 1926 – 24 September 2017) was an Italian racing cyclist. He rode in the 1952 Tour de France.
