= Giovanni Roma =

Italian cyclist

Personal information
- Born: 2 March 1928
- Died: 9 August 2007 (aged 79)

Cycling career
- Sport: Cycling
- Role: Rider

Giovanni Roma (2 March 1928 – 9 August 2007) was an Italian racing cyclist. He finished in seventh place in the 1953 Giro d'Italia.
