= Enzo Coppini =

Italian cyclist

Personal information
- Born: 18 April 1920 Agliana, Italy
- Died: 29 July 2011 (aged 91) Prato, Italy

Cycling career
- Sport: Cycling
- Role: Rider

Enzo Coppini (18 April 1920 – 29 July 2011) was an Italian racing cyclist. He rode in the 1948 Tour de France.
