= Pietro Giudici =

Italian cyclist

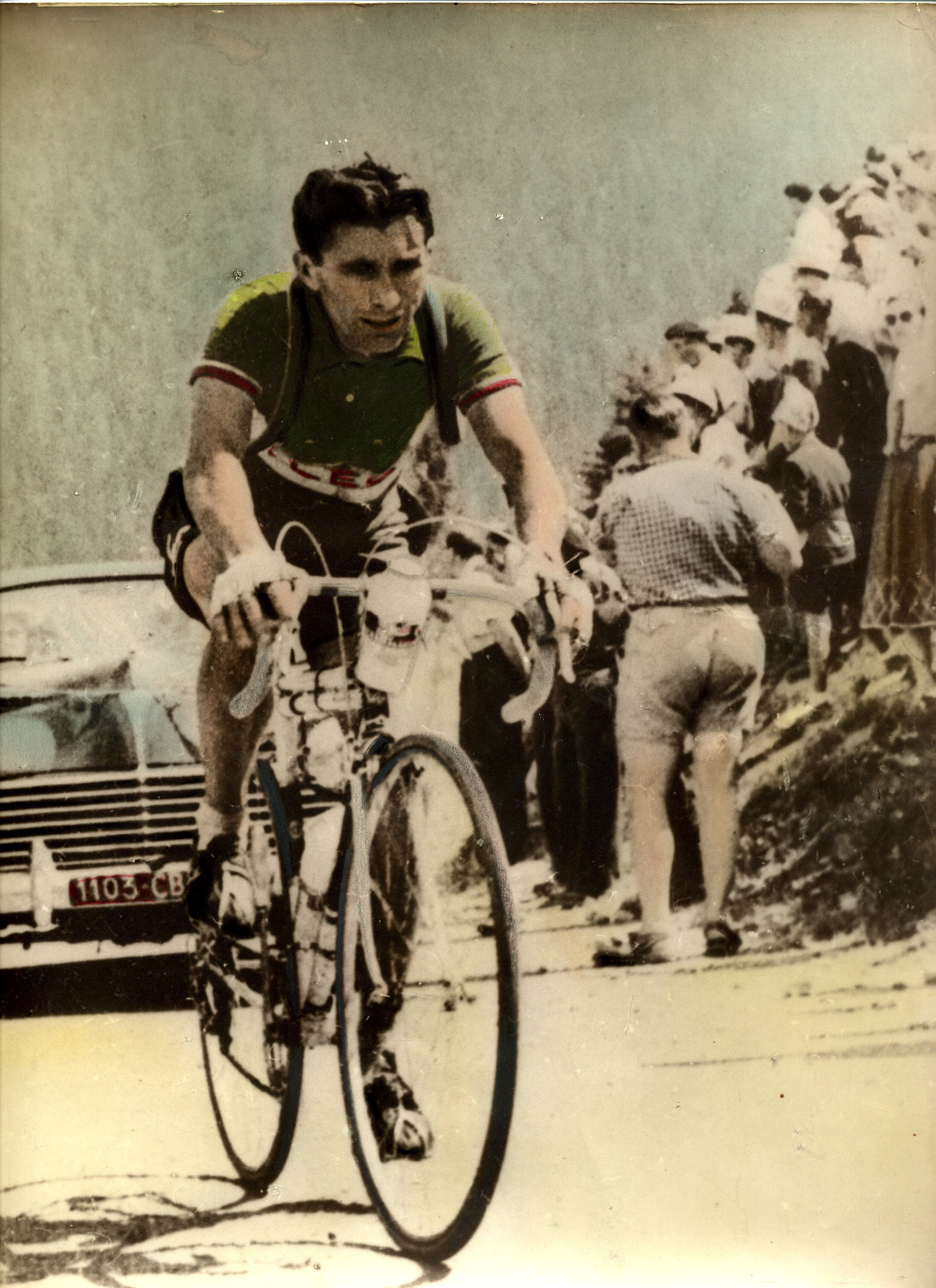
- Pietro Giudici in the 1955 Tour de France

Personal information
- Born: 21 July 1921 Vergiate, Italy
- Died: 11 November 2002 (aged 81) Binago, Italy

Cycling career
- Sport: Cycling
- Role: Rider

Pietro Giudici (21 July 1921 – 11 November 2002) was an Italian professional racing cyclist. He rode in two editions of the Tour de France.
