= Aldo Baito =

Italian cyclist

Personal information
- Born: 4 January 1920 Gorla Minore, Italy
- Died: 20 December 2015 (aged 95)

Cycling career
- Sport: Cycling
- Role: Rider

Aldo Baito (4 January 1920 – 20 December 2015) was an Italian racing cyclist. He won stage 9 of the 1946 Giro d'Italia.

== Major results ==
1948
9th Tour de Romandie
