= Armando Peverelli =

Italian cyclist (1921–1981)

Personal information
- Born: 2 December 1921 Milan, Italy
- Died: 18 July 1981 (aged 59) Italy

Cycling career
- Sport: Cycling
- Role: Rider

Armando Peverelli (2 December 1921 – 18 July 1981) was an Italian racing cyclist. He rode in the 1949 Tour de France.
