= Annibale Brasola =

Italian cyclist

Personal information
- Born: 16 June 1925 Galzignano Terme, Italy
- Died: 30 November 2001 (aged 76)

Cycling career
- Sport: Cycling
- Role: Rider

Annibale Brasola (16 June 1925 – 30 November 2001) was an Italian racing cyclist. He won stage 17 of the 1950 Giro d'Italia.
