= Attilio Lambertini =

Italian cyclist

Personal information
- Born: 3 June 1920 Viconovo, Italy
- Died: 25 December 2002 (aged 82) Acapulco, Mexico

Cycling career
- Sport: Cycling
- Role: Rider

Attilio Lambertini (3 June 1920 – 25 December 2002) was an Italian racing cyclist. He rode in three editions of Tour de France between 1948 and 1951.
