= Valerio Bonini =

Italian cyclist

Personal information
- Born: 9 September 1924
- Died: 15 December 2003 (aged 79)

Cycling career
- Sport: Cycling
- Role: Rider

Valerio Bonini (9 September 1924 – 15 December 2003) was an Italian racing cyclist. He rode in the 1950 Tour de France.
