= Renzo Soldani =

Italian cyclist

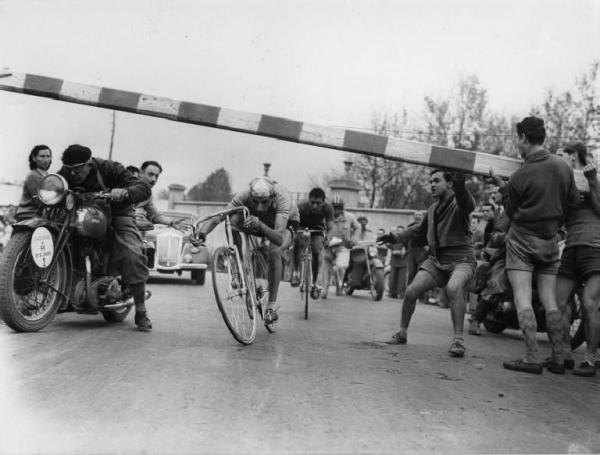
- Coppi Soldano Lombardia 1950

Personal information
- Born: 2 May 1925 Pistoia, Italy
- Died: 2 January 2013 (aged 87) Pistoia, Italy

Cycling career
- Sport: Cycling
- Role: Rider

Renzo Soldani (2 May 1925 – 2 January 2013) was an Italian racing cyclist. He won the 1950 edition of the Giro di Lombardia.
