= Serafino Biagioni =

Italian cyclist (1920–1983)

Personal information
- Full name: Serafino Biagioni
- Born: 12 March 1920 Pistoia, Italy
- Died: 13 February 1983 (aged 62)

Cycling career
- Sport: Cycling
- Discipline: Road
- Role: Rider

Major wins
- 3 stages Giro d'Italia; 2 stages Tour de France

Serafino Biagioni (12 March 1920, at Pistoia, Italy – 13 February 1983) was an Italian professional road bicycle racer.

== Professional career ==
He was professional from 1945 to 1956 and won 8 victories. He won two stage victories in the 1951 Tour de France and wore the yellow jersey. Other victories include three stage wins in the Giro d'Italia.

== Major results ==
1939
Giro dell'Emilia
1945
GP Industria & Commercio di Prato
1948
Giro d'Italia:

Winner stage 10
9th place overall classification

1949
Giro d'Italia:

Winner stage 5
8th place overall classification

1951
Giro d'Italia:

Winner stage 11

Tour de France:

Winner stages 5 and 13
Wearing yellow jersey for one day

1953
Sassari
1955
Pisa
1956
Pisa
