= Angelo Menon =

Italian cyclist

Personal information
- Born: 29 October 1919
- Died: 12 December 2013 (aged 94)

Cycling career
- Sport: Cycling
- Role: Rider

Angelo Menon (29 October 1919 – 12 December 2013) was an Italian racing cyclist. He won stage 7 of the 1951 Giro d'Italia.
