= Egidio Feruglio (cyclist) =

Italian cyclist

Personal information
- Born: 6 January 1921 Tavagnacco, Italy
- Died: 2 July 1981 (aged 60) Udine, Italy

Cycling career
- Sport: Cycling
- Role: Rider

Egidio Feruglio (6 January 1921 – 2 July 1981) was an Italian racing cyclist. He rode in the 1947 and 1948 Tour de France.
