= Alfredo Pasotti =

Italian cyclist

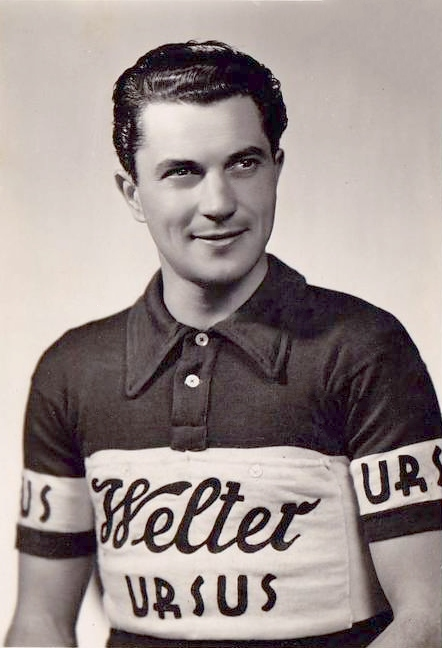

Personal information
- Full name: Alfredo Pasotti
- Born: January 6, 1925 Bastida Pancarana, Italy
- Died: September 12, 2000 (aged 75) Bastida Pancarana, Italy

Cycling career
- Sport: Cycling
- Discipline: Road
- Role: Rider

Major wins
- 2 stages Tour de France

Alfredo Pasotti (6 January 1925 – 12 September 2000) was an Italian professional road bicycle racer. He won stages 3 and 9 at the 1950 Tour de France and stage 13 at the 1952 Giro d'Italia.
