= Silvio Pedroni =

Italian cyclist (1918–2003)

Personal information
- Born: 25 January 1918 Castelverde, Italy
- Died: 10 June 2003 (aged 85) Cremona, Italy

Cycling career
- Sport: Cycling

Silvio Pedroni (25 January 1918 – 10 June 2003) was an Italian cyclist. He competed in the individual and team road race events at the 1948 Summer Olympics. He also rode in the 1949 Tour de France.
