= Elio Bertocchi =

Italian cyclist (1919–1971)

Personal information
- Born: 16 September 1919 Ferrara, Italy
- Died: 27 August 1971 (aged 51)

Cycling career
- Sport: Cycling
- Role: Rider

Elio Bertocchi (16 September 1919 – 27 August 1971) was an Italian racing cyclist. He rode in the 1947 Tour de France.
