= Mario Fazio =

Italian cyclist

Personal information
- Born: 26 July 1919 Catania, Italy
- Died: 13 November 1983 (aged 64) Catania, Italy

Cycling career
- Sport: Cycling
- Role: Rider

Mario Fazio (26 July 1919 – 13 November 1983) was an Italian racing cyclist. He rode in the 1948 Tour de France.
