= Angelo Brignole =

Italian cyclist

Personal information
- Born: 10 March 1924 Borzonasca, Italy
- Died: 19 February 2006 (aged 81) Borgomasca, Italy

Cycling career
- Sport: Cycling
- Role: Rider

Angelo Brignole (10 March 1924 – 19 February 2006) was an Italian racing cyclist. He was an active cyclist between 1946 and 1950. He rode in the 1949 Tour de France.
