= Nedo Logli =

Italian cyclist

Personal information
- Born: 23 July 1923 Prato, Italy
- Died: 28 October 2014 (aged 91)

Cycling career
- Sport: Cycling
- Role: Rider

Nedo Logli (23 July 1923 – 28 October 2014) was an Italian racing cyclist. He won stage 9 of the 1948 Giro d'Italia.
