= Ganna (cycling team) =

Italian professional cycling team

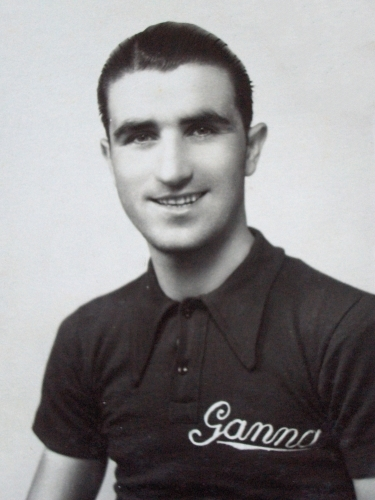
- Cesare Del Cancia c. 1930s

Team information
- Registered: Italy
- Founded: 1913
- Disbanded: 1953
- Discipline: Road
- Bicycles: Ganna

Team name history
- 1913–1915 1922 1923 1924 1926 1927 1931–1932 1933–1940 1949 1950 1951–1953: Ganna; Ganna–Dunlop; Ganna; Ganna–Dunlop; Ganna; Ganna–Dunlop; Ganna–Dunlop; Ganna; Ganna–Ursus; Ganna–Superga; Ganna–Ursus

Ganna was an Italian professional cycling team that existed in part between 1913 and 1953. It was started by Luigi Ganna, winner of the general classification of the inaugural Giro d'Italia, and was sponsored by his bicycle and motorcycle manufacturing company. Whilst with the team, Fiorenzo Magni won the general classification of the 1951 Giro d'Italia. The team was the predecessor of the Nivea–Fuchs team.
