= Fréjus (cycling team) =

Italian professional cycling team

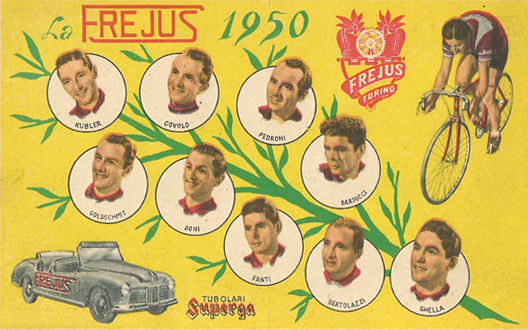
- The Fréjus team of 1950

Team information
- Registered: Italy
- Founded: 1935
- Disbanded: 1956
- Discipline: Road
- Bicycles: Fréjus

Team name history
- 1935–1945 1946–1949 1950 1951 1952–1955 1956: Fréjus; Fréjus–Pirelli; Fréjus–Superga; Fréjus–Ursus; Fréjus; Fréjus–Superga

Fréjus was an Italian professional cycling team that existed from 1935 to 1956. Its main sponsor was the Italian bicycle manufacturer Fréjus. Whilst with Fréjus, Giovanni Valetti won the general classification of the Giro d'Italia in 1938 and 1939.
