= Giulio Bresci =

Italian cyclist

Personal information
- Born: 19 November 1921 Prato, Italy
- Died: 8 August 1998 (aged 76) Prato, Italy

Cycling career
- Sport: Cycling
- Discipline: Road
- Role: Rider

Giulio Bresci (born 19 November 1921 – 8 August 1998) was an Italian professional road racing cyclist.

== Major results ==
1946
6th Giro d'Italia
1947
2nd Giro del Lazio
2nd Tour de Suisse

1st Stage 4

3rd Giro d'Italia

1st Stage 18

1948
1st Gran Premio Industria e Commercio di Prato
1st Stage 4 Tour de Romandie
2nd Tour de Suisse

1st Stage 2

4th Tour de Romandie
7th Giro d'Italia
1949
7th Giro d'Italia
1951
2nd Gran Premio Industria e Commercio di Prato
