= Renzo Zanazzi =

Italian cyclist

Personal information
- Born: 5 April 1924 Gazzuolo, Italy
- Died: 28 January 2014 (aged 89)

Cycling career
- Sport: Cycling
- Role: Rider

Renzo Zanazzi (5 April 1924 – 28 January 2014) was an Italian racing cyclist. He won stage 10 of the 1946 Giro d'Italia.
