= Luciano Pezzi =

Italian cyclist

Personal information
- Full name: Luciano Pezzi
- Born: 7 February 1921 Russi, Italy
- Died: 26 June 1998 (aged 77) Bologna, Italy

Cycling career
- Sport: Cycling
- Discipline: Road
- Role: Rider

Major wins
- 1 stage 1955 Tour de France

Luciano Pezzi (7 February 1921, Russi, Province of Ravenna – 26 June 1998) was an Italian professional road bicycle racer.

== Early life ==
He was born in Russi.

== Death ==
He died in Bologna at age 77.

== Major results ==
1947
1st Coppa Collecchio
1955
Tour de France:

Winner stage 15
