= Luigi Casola =

Italian cyclist

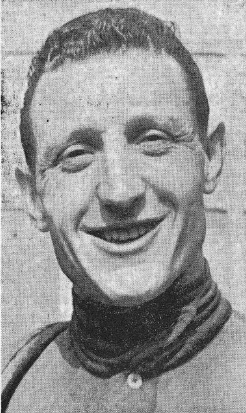

Personal information
- Born: 11 July 1921 Busto Arsizio, Italy
- Died: 6 April 2009 (aged 87)

Cycling career
- Sport: Cycling
- Role: Rider

Luigi Casola (11 July 1921 – 6 April 2009) was an Italian racing cyclist. He won stages 4 and 6 of the 1948 Giro d'Italia.
