= Alfredo Martini =

Italian cyclist and coach

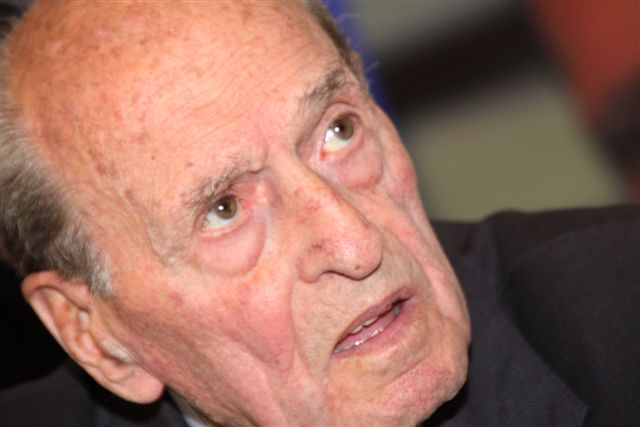

Personal information
- Born: 18 February 1921 Sesto Fiorentino, Italy
- Died: 28 August 2014 (aged 93) Sesto Fiorentino, Italy

Cycling career
- Sport: Cycling
- Role: Rider

Alfredo Martini (18 February 1921 – 25 August 2014) was an Italian cyclist and coach from Sesto Fiorentino, north of Florence. Professional from 1941 to 1957, he won a stage in the 1950 Giro d'Italia and was later the coach of the Italian national team. He also rode in the 1949 Tour de France. In 2021, in honour of Martini's 100th birthday, the one-day race Per sempre Alfredo was first held; the race finishes in Martini's home town of Sesto Fiorentino.

Under his 22-year tenure as head coach, Italy got six gold medals at the Road World Championships with 5 different cyclists (Francesco Moser, Giuseppe Saronni, Moreno Argentin, Maurizio Fondriest once each and Gianni Bugno twice), plus seven silver and as many bronze medals.
