= Wilier Triestina (cycling team) =

Italian professional cycling team

Team information
- Registered: Italy
- Founded: 1946
- Disbanded: 1951
- Discipline: Road
- Bicycles: Wilier Triestina

Team name history
- 1946–1951: Wilier Triestina

Wilier Triestina was an Italian professional cycling team that existed from 1946 to 1951. It was sponsored by Italian bicycle manufacturer Wilier Triestina. Fiorenzo Magni won the general classification of the 1948 Giro d'Italia with the team.
