= 1955 Challenge Desgrange-Colombo =

8th season of cycling tour

- Eighth edition of the Challenge Desgrange-Colombo

Details
- Dates: 19 March – 23 October
- Location: Europe
- Races: 11

Champions
- Individual champion: Stan Ockers (BEL) (Elvé-Peugeot)
- Nations' champion: Belgium

The 1955 Challenge Desgrange-Colombo was the eighth edition of the Challenge Desgrange-Colombo. It included eleven races: all the races form the 1954 edition were retained with no additions. Stan Ockers won the individual championship while Belgium retained the nations championship.

== Races ==
Date	Race	Country	Winner	Team	Report
19 March	Milan–San Remo	Italy	Germain Derycke (BEL)	Alcyon–Dunlop	Report
27 March	Tour of Flanders	Belgium	Louison Bobet (FRA)	Bobet–BP–Hutchinson	Report
10 April	Paris–Roubaix	France	Jean Forestier (FRA)		Report
24 April	Paris–Brussels	France/Belgium	Marcel Hendrickx (BEL)	Elvé-Peugeot	Report
30 April	La Flèche Wallonne	Belgium	Stan Ockers (BEL)	Elvé-Peugeot	Report
1 May	Liège–Bastogne–Liège	Belgium	Stan Ockers (BEL)	Elvé-Peugeot	Report
14 May – 5 June	Giro d'Italia	Italy	Fiorenzo Magni (ITA)	Nivea-Fuchs	Report
11 June – 18 June	Tour de Suisse	Switzerland	Hugo Koblet (SUI)		Report
7 July – 30 July	Tour de France	France	Louison Bobet (FRA)	France	Report
9 October	Paris–Tours	France	Jacques Dupont (FRA)		Report
23 October	Giro di Lombardia	Italy	Cleto Maule (ITA)	Torpado	Report

== Final standings ==
=== Riders ===
	Cyclist	Team	Points
1	Stan Ockers (BEL)	Elvé-Peugeot	91
2	Louison Bobet (FRA)		80
3	Jean Brankart (BEL)		78
4	Hugo Koblet (SUI)		58
5	Germain Derijcke (BEL)		53
6	Pasquale Fornara (ITA)		41
7=	Raymond Impanis (BEL)		38
7=	Bernard Gauthier (FRA)		38
9	Rik Van Steenbergen (BEL)		36
10	Fred De Bruyne (BEL)		34

=== Nations ===
	Nation	Points
1	Belgium	445
2	France	387
3	Italy	359
