= 1953 Challenge Desgrange-Colombo =

Cycling season 6

- Sixth edition of the Challenge Desgrange-Colombo

Details
- Dates: 18 March – 25 October
- Location: Europe
- Races: 11

Champions
- Individual champion: Loretto Petrucci (ITA) (Bianchi–Pirelli)
- Nations' champion: Italy

The 1953 Challenge Desgrange-Colombo was the sixth edition of the Challenge Desgrange-Colombo. It included eleven races: all the races form the 1952 edition were retained with no additions. Loretto Petrucci won the individual championship while Italy retained the nations championship.

== Races ==
Date	Race	Country	Winner	Team	Report
19 March	Milan–San Remo	Italy	Loretto Petrucci (ITA)	Bianchi–Pirelli	Report
5 April	Tour of Flanders	Belgium	Wim van Est (NED)	Garin	Report
12 April	Paris–Roubaix	France	Germain Derycke (BEL)		Report
26 April	Paris–Brussels	France/Belgium	Loretto Petrucci (ITA)	Bianchi–Pirelli	Report
2 May	La Flèche Wallonne	Belgium	Stan Ockers (BEL)		Report
3 May	Liège–Bastogne–Liège	Belgium	Alois De Hertog (BEL)		Report
12 May – 2 June	Giro d'Italia	Italy	Fausto Coppi (ITA)	Bianchi–Pirelli	Report
17 June – 24 June	Tour de Suisse	Switzerland	Hugo Koblet (SUI)		Report
3 July – 26 July	Tour de France	France	Louison Bobet (FRA)	France	Report
4 October	Paris–Tours	France	Jozef Schils (BEL)		Report
25 October	Giro di Lombardia	Italy	Bruno Landi (ITA)	Fiorelli	Report

== Final standings ==
=== Riders ===
	Cyclist	Team	Points
1	Loretto Petrucci (ITA)	Bianchi–Pirelli	69
2	Louison Bobet (FRA)		66
3	Stan Ockers (BEL)		53
4	Pasquale Fornara (ITA)		48
5	Ferdinand Kübler (SUI)		41
6	Nino Defilippis (ITA)		39
7	Germain Derijcke (BEL)		38
8	Wout Wagtmans (NED)		37
9	Raymond Impanis (BEL)		36
10	Alex Close (BEL)		34

=== Nations ===
	Nation	Points
1	Italy	453
2	Belgium	444
3	France	355
