= 1956 Tour of Flanders =

40th Tour of Flanders

Race details
- Dates: 2 April 1956
- Stages: 1
- Distance: 238 km (147.9 mi)
- Winning time: 6h 09'

Results
	Winner	Jean Forestier (FRA)	(Follis–Dunlop)
	Second	Stan Ockers (BEL)	(Elve–Peugeot)
	Third	Leon Van Daele (BEL)	(Bertin)

The 40th running of the Tour of Flanders cycling classic was held on Easter Monday, 2 April 1956. French rider Jean Forestier won the race after a late breakaway from a 30-strong group in Wetteren. Sprint specialist Stan Ockers won the sprint for second place; Leon Van Daele was third. 37 of 122 riders finished.

== Route ==
The race started in Ghent and finished in Wetteren – totaling 238 km. The course featured five categorized climbs:

- Kwaremont
- Kruisberg
- Statieberg
- Eikenberg
- Kattenberg

== Results ==
Result
Rank	Rider	Team	Time
1	Jean Forestier (FRA)	Follis–Dunlop	6h 09' 00"
2	Stan Ockers (BEL)	Elve–Peugeot	+ 9"
3	Leon Van Daele (BEL)	Bertin	s.t.
4	Rik Van Steenbergen (BEL)	Elve–Peugeot	s.t.
5	Lucien Mathys (BEL)	Groene Leeuw	s.t.
6	Germain Derijcke (BEL)	Van Hauwaert–Faema–Guerra	s.t.
7	André Vlayen (BEL)	Elve–Peugeot	s.t.
8	Briek Schotte (BEL)	Faema	s.t.
9	Ernest Sterckx (BEL)	Elve–Peugeot	s.t.
10	Jan Zagers (BEL)	Libertas	s.t.
