= 1954 Giro d'Italia =

Race details
- Dates: 21 May - 13 June 1954
- Stages: 22
- Distance: 4,337 km (2,695 mi)
- Winning time: 129h 13' 07"

Results
| Jersey awarded to the overall winner | Winner | Carlo Clerici (SUI) | (Guerra) |
| | Second | Hugo Koblet (SUI) | (Guerra) |
| | Third | Nino Assirelli (ITA) | (Arbos) |
| | Mountains | Fausto Coppi (ITA) | (Bianchi) |
| | Sprints | Rik Van Steenbergen (BEL) | (Girardengo) |
| | Team | Girardengo | |

The 1954 Giro d'Italia was the 37th edition of the Giro d'Italia, one of cycling's Grand Tours. The Giro started off in Palermo on 21 May with a 36 km (22.4 mi) team time trial and concluded in Milan with a 222 km (137.9 mi) relatively flat mass-start stage on 13 June. Fifteen teams entered the race, which was won by Swiss Carlo Clerici of the Welter team. Second and third respectively were Swiss rider Hugo Koblet and Italian Nino Assirelli.

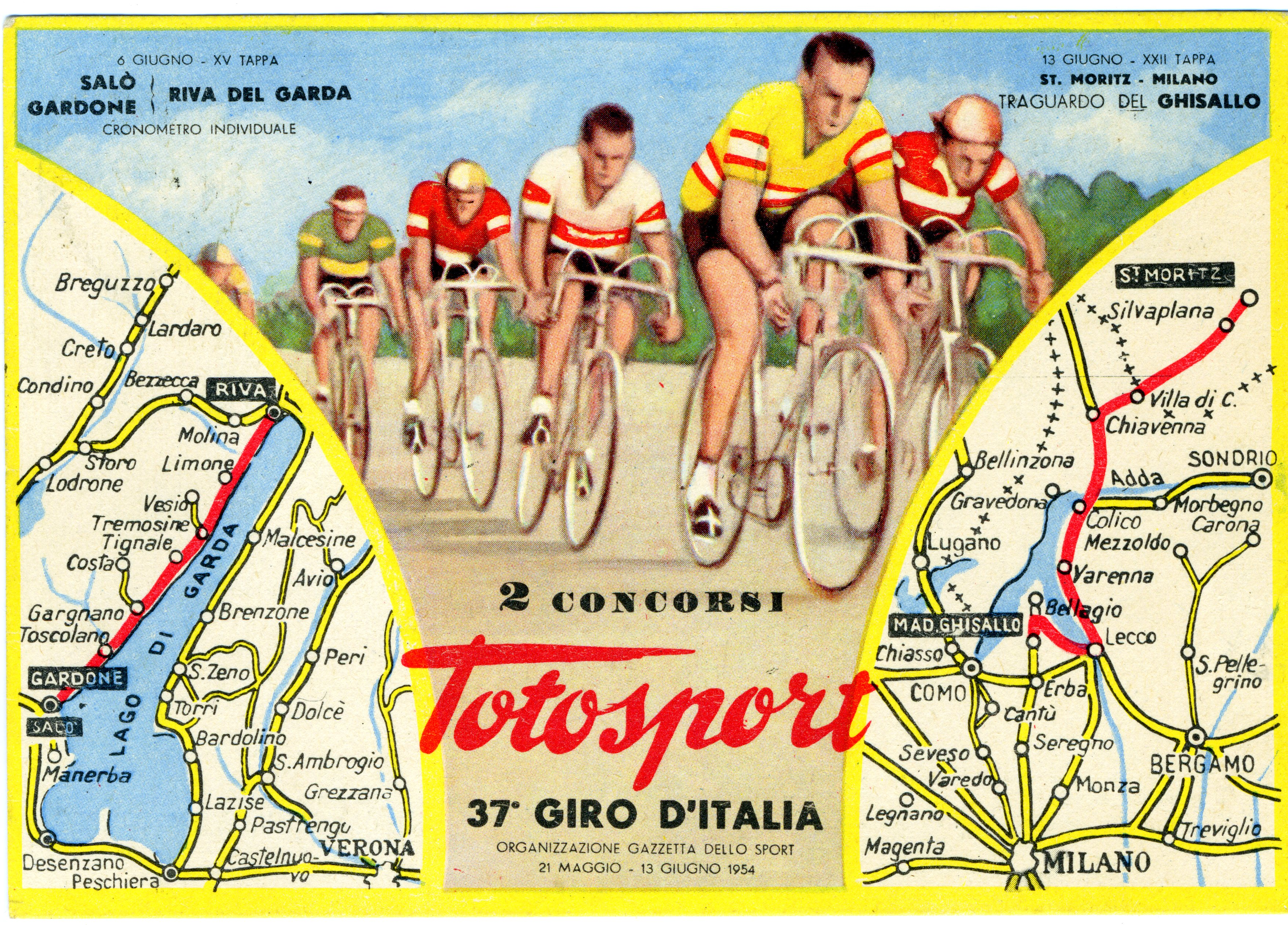
1954 Giro d'Italia promotional postcard

== Teams ==
Fifteen teams were invited by the race organizers to participate in the 1954 edition of the Giro d'Italia. The organizers invited neighboring countries to gather a squad of riders to send to compete in the race. Belgium, Germany, the Netherlands, Switzerland all entered a team, while France was offered a spot in the race and accepted, but could not form a team in time. Each team sent a squad of seven riders, which meant that the race started with a peloton of 105 cyclists. From the riders that began the race, 67 made it to the finish in Milan.

The five national teams were all sponsored by bicycle factories:

- Belgium, sponsored by Girardengo
- Germany, sponsored by Clement
- The Netherlands, sponsored by Locomotief
- Spain, sponsored by Ideor
- Switzerland, sponsored by Guerra

The ten other teams from Italy were:

- Bianchi
- Arbos
- Atala
- Bartali
- Bottecchia
- Doniselli-Lansetina
- Fréjus
- Legnano
- Nivea-Fuchs
- Torpado–Ursus

== Pre-race favorites ==
Fausto Coppi (Bianchi) was seen as the clear–cut favorite, because of the strength of his supporting team. Coppi's greatest challenger was thought to be Hugo Koblet (Cilo). Koblet entered the race in what was regarded as not great form, but if he were to gain his form in the race, then his chances of victory would be large. A La Sentinelle writer felt that Koblet's presence made the competition interesting as it felt no other rider could challenge Coppi. Koblet was thought to have a better support from his team relative to the past couple of years and was expected to contend for the general classification.

Outside candidates included Fiorenzo Magni (Nivea) who would normally be considered a more legitimate contender; however, he was recovering from a fall in the one–day race Roma–Napoli–Roma. Roma-Napoli-Roma winner Bruno Monti (Arbos) and Pasquale Fornara (Bottecchia) were seen as other challengers. "Old" three–time champion Gino Bartali (Bartali) lined up to race while being supported by his usual domestiques Corrieri and Bresci.

While noting that the Giro had been primarily won by Italian riders, Feuille d'Avis Valaisan felt the teams with Belgians, Spanish, and Swiss teams would have a good chance to rival the Italian squads. Nouvelliste Valasain writer even commented that a coalition of some sort exists between Italian riders against the foreign riders. Girardengo-Eldorado riders Stan Ockers and Rik Van Steenbergen were seen as the best Belgian entrants. Their Raymond Impanis was seen a potential threat, but due to disputes with their team director, his participation was questionable. Heinz Müller was the German Clement team's best chance. The Dutch team Locomotief was thought to be filled with good climbers and rouleurs with the likes of Wim Van Est, Wout Wagtmans, and the Voorting brothers Adrie and Gerrit. The team was expected to do well in the opening team time trial. Spanish Climber Jesus Loroño (Ideor) was seen as a contender in the mountains after his performance at the 1953 Tour de France, where he won as a stage and the Mountains classification. Bernardo Ruiz and Francisco Masip were two other Spanish riders to watch. Fritz Schär (Guerra) was seen as a rider who would favor the intermediate sprints classification despite his recent poor performance at the Tour de Romandie. Carlo Clerici (Welter) was thought to have "class and will."

Notable absences included Ferdinand Kübler (Fiorelli) who had an ongoing dispute with the race organizers following his abandonment of the Giro the year before. Louison Bobet (Mercier) was seen as a rider who could pose a threat to Coppi, but due to previous incidents of giving him up, he was not seen as a strong contender.

== Route and stages ==
The route's first fourteen stages were revealed on 25 February 1954, amid speculation that Rome was not going to be included. The rest was revealed on 6 May 1954. The route included two time trials, one team and one individual, and was the longest Giro as of 2023; the fourth stage is the only post-WWII Giro stage longer than 350 km. The inclusion of the team time trial was criticized as it was thought to give too much of an advantage to the wealthier teams. In addition, the team time trial that year was held midway through the race and several teams were down men through disease or abandonment, which only further hindered teams. To assuage this complaint of the teams, the team time trial stage was made first. Critics felt that the route would be similar to year's past, where all the action would be in the closing days, citing the 20th and 21st stages as being the most difficult. The press felt that the increased number of intermediate sprints would lead to more attacks throughout the stage ad help animate the race. The race started in Palermo for the first time since 1949.

Stage characteristics and results
| Stage | Date | Course | Distance | Type | Winner |
|---|---|---|---|---|---|
| 1 | 21 May | Palermo | 36 km (22 mi) | Team time trial | Bianchi |
| 2 | 22 May | Palermo to Taormina | 280 km (174 mi) | Stage with mountain(s) | Giuseppe Minardi (ITA) |
| 3 | 23 May | Reggio Calabria to Catanzaro | 172 km (107 mi) | Plain stage | Nino Defilippis (ITA) |
| 4 | 24 May | Catanzaro to Bari | 352 km (219 mi) | Plain stage | Angelo Conterno (ITA) |
| | 25 May | Rest day | | | |
| 5 | 26 May | Bari to Naples | 279 km (173 mi) | Plain stage | Rik Van Steenbergen (BEL) |
| 6 | 27 May | Naples to L'Aquila | 252 km (157 mi) | Plain stage | Carlo Clerici (SUI) |
| 7 | 28 May | L'Aquila to Rome | 150 km (93 mi) | Plain stage | Giorgio Albani (ITA) |
| 8 | 29 May | Rome to Chianciano Terme | 195 km (121 mi) | Plain stage | Giovanni Pettinati (ITA) |
| 9 | 30 May | Chianciano Terme to Florence | 180 km (112 mi) | Plain stage | Giovanni Corrieri (ITA) |
| 10 | 31 May | Florence to Cesenatico | 211 km (131 mi) | Stage with mountain(s) | Pietro Giudici (ITA) |
| 11 | 1 June | Cesenatico to Abetone | 230 km (143 mi) | Stage with mountain(s) | Mauro Gianneschi (ITA) |
| 12 | 2 June | Abetone to Genoa | 251 km (156 mi) | Plain stage | Hilaire Couvreur (BEL) |
| 13 | 3 June | Genoa to Turin | 211 km (131 mi) | Plain stage | Wout Wagtmans (NED) |
| 14 | 4 June | Turin to Brescia | 240 km (149 mi) | Plain stage | Annibale Brasola (ITA) |
| | 5 June | Rest day | | | |
| 15 | 6 June | Gardone Riviera to Riva del Garda | 42 km (26 mi) | Individual time trial | Hugo Koblet (SUI) |
| 16 | 7 June | Riva del Garda to Abano Terme | 131 km (81 mi) | Plain stage | Rik Van Steenbergen (BEL) |
| 17 | 8 June | Abano Terme to Padua | 105 km (65 mi) | Plain stage | Rik Van Steenbergen (BEL) |
| 18 | 9 June | Padua to Grado | 177 km (110 mi) | Plain stage | Adolfo Grosso (ITA) |
| 19 | 10 June | Grado to San Martino di Castrozza | 247 km (153 mi) | Plain stage | Wout Wagtmans (NED) |
| 20 | 11 June | San Martino di Castrozza to Bolzano | 152 km (94 mi) | Stage with mountain(s) | Fausto Coppi (ITA) |
| 21 | 12 June | Bolzano to Saint Moritz (Switzerland) | 222 km (138 mi) | Stage with mountain(s) | Hugo Koblet (SUI) |
| 22 | 13 June | Saint Moritz (Switzerland) to Milan | 222 km (138 mi) | Plain stage | Rik Van Steenbergen (BEL) |
| | Total | | 4,337 km (2,695 mi) | | |

== Race overview ==
In the sixth stage, Carlo Clerici escaped and took the lead with a big margin.

Before the tenth stage, the German team had already lost four of its seven riders, and in that tenth stage one German rider finished outside of the time limit. The German team thus only had two riders remaining, and saw no reason to continue. The possibility to combine the German team with the Dutch team (which had also lost riders already) was discussed, but was not allowed by the Giro organisation, so the German team left the race.

In the twentieth stage, Fausto Coppi won and took some time back. His fans were hoping that he would show more action on the twenty-first stage which included the Bernina Pass, but cyclists rode slowly as a form of protest against the racing conditions, taking almost ten hours to cover the 222 km stage; this event became known as the Bernina strike. When the race ended in Milan the next day, angry supporters whistled at the cyclists. For his leading role in the strike, Coppi was given a two-month suspension, although this was later revoked.

== Classification leadership ==
The leader of the general classification – calculated by adding the stage finish times of each rider – wore a pink jersey; the Giro of 1954 had no time bonuses. This classification is the most important of the race, and its winner is considered as the winner of the Giro. The winner of the general classification received 72,000 francs. In total 32,555,000 lire (then roughly 227,000 Swiss francs) was awarded. Each day a rider wore the pink jersey, he would win 15,000 francs. Each stage winner received 49,000 francs. There may have been a green jersey was awarded to the best ranked foreign rider in the general classification, who also received a sum of money each day the jersey was awarded, as in the previous years: some sources say there was a jersey, others indicate there is doubt, others indicate there was no jersey.

The mountains classification awarded all awarded three points to the first rider and one point to the second rider to cross the summit of a categorized climb. There was no leader's jersey awarded for this classification. The winner received 10,000 francs.

In the gran premio traguardi volanti or intermediate sprint classification points were awarded at designated sprint locations throughout each stage's route and at the stage finishes.In total there were 64 designated sprint points throughout the race. Points were awarded to the first three riders to pass through the assigned point: first received five points, second received three points, and third received one point. The winner of each sprint will receive 650 francs, while the overall classification winner received 81,000 francs. The leader of this classification wore a white jersey.

Although no jersey was awarded, there was also a classification for the teams, which was calculated as the total points earned per team in the intermediate sprints classification.

Classification leadership by stage
| Stage | Winner | General classification | Mountains classification | Team classification |
|---|---|---|---|---|
| 1 | Bianchi | Fausto Coppi | not awarded | Bianchi |
| 2 | Giuseppe Minardi | Giuseppe Minardi | Giuseppe Minardi | Legnano |
| 3 | Nino Defilippis | Giuseppe Minardi | Giuseppe Minardi | Guerra |
| 4 | Angelo Conterno | Giuseppe Minardi | Giuseppe Minardi | Girardengo |
| 5 | Rik Van Steenbergen | Gerrit Voorting | Giuseppe Minardi | Girardengo |
| 6 | Carlo Clerici | Carlo Clerici | Giuseppe Minardi | Girardengo |
| 7 | Giorgio Albani | Carlo Clerici | Giuseppe Minardi | Girardengo |
| 8 | Giovanni Pettinati | Carlo Clerici | Giuseppe Minardi | Girardengo |
| 9 | Giovanni Corrieri | Carlo Clerici | Giuseppe Minardi | Girardengo |
| 10 | Pietro Giudici | Carlo Clerici | Giuseppe Minardi & Primo Volpi | Girardengo |
| 11 | Mauro Gianneschi | Carlo Clerici | Mauro Gianneschi, Giuseppe Minardi & Primo Volpi | Girardengo |
| 12 | Hilaire Couvreur | Carlo Clerici | Mauro Gianneschi, Giuseppe Minardi & Primo Volpi | Girardengo |
| 13 | Wout Wagtmans | Carlo Clerici | Mauro Gianneschi, Giuseppe Minardi & Primo Volpi | Girardengo |
| 14 | Annibale Brasola | Carlo Clerici | Mauro Gianneschi, Giuseppe Minardi & Primo Volpi | Girardengo |
| 15 | Hugo Koblet | Carlo Clerici | Mauro Gianneschi, Giuseppe Minardi & Primo Volpi | Girardengo |
| 16 | Rik Van Steenbergen | Carlo Clerici | Mauro Gianneschi, Giuseppe Minardi & Primo Volpi | Girardengo |
| 17 | Rik Van Steenbergen | Carlo Clerici | Mauro Gianneschi, Giuseppe Minardi & Primo Volpi | Girardengo |
| 18 | Adolfo Grosso | Carlo Clerici | Mauro Gianneschi, Giuseppe Minardi & Primo Volpi | Girardengo |
| 19 | Wout Wagtmans | Carlo Clerici | Mauro Gianneschi, Giuseppe Minardi & Primo Volpi | Girardengo |
| 20 | Fausto Coppi | Carlo Clerici | Fausto Coppi | Girardengo |
| 21 | Hugo Koblet | Carlo Clerici | Fausto Coppi | Girardengo |
| 22 | Rik Van Steenbergen | Carlo Clerici | Fausto Coppi | Girardengo |
| Final | | Carlo Clerici | Fausto Coppi | Girardengo |

== Final standings ==
Legend
| Pink jersey | Denotes the winner of the General classification |
| A white jersey | Denotes the winner of the intermediate sprints classification |

=== General classification ===
Final general classification (1–10)
| Rank | Name | Team | Time |
|---|---|---|---|
| 1 | Carlo Clerici (SUI) | Guerra | 129h 13' 07" |
| 2 | Hugo Koblet (SUI) | Guerra | + 24' 16" |
| 3 | Nino Assirelli (ITA) | Arbos | + 26' 28" |
| 4 | Fausto Coppi (ITA) | Bianchi | + 31' 17" |
| 5 | Giancarlo Astrua (ITA) | Atala | + 33' 09" |
| 6 | Fiorenzo Magni (ITA) | Nivea | + 34' 01" |
| 7 | Gerrit Voorting (NED) | Locomotief | + 35' 05" |
| 8 | Pasquale Fornara (ITA) | Bottecchia | + 36' 21" |
| 9 | Fritz Schär (SUI) | Guerra | + 40' 51" |
| 10 | Angelo Conterno (ITA) | Fréjus | + 41' 07" |

=== Mountains classification ===
Final mountains classification (1–8)
| | Name | Team | Points |
|---|---|---|---|
| 1 | Fausto Coppi (ITA) | Bianchi | 6 |
| 2 | Giancarlo Astrua (ITA) | Atala | 5 |
| 3 | Primo Volpi (ITA) | Arbos | 3 |
| 3 | Mauro Gianneschi (ITA) | Arbos | 3 |
| 3 | Vincenzo Rossello (ITA) | Nivea | 3 |
| 3 | Angelo Conterno (ITA) | Fréjus | 3 |
| 7 | Pasquale Fornara (ITA) | Bottecchia | 2 |
| 8 | Gerrit Voorting (NED) | Locomotief | 1 |
| 8 | Adolfo Grosso (ITA) | Atala | 1 |
| 8 | Nino Defilippis (ITA) | Torpado | 1 |
| 8 | Jesus Loroño (ESP) | Ideor | 1 |

=== Intermediate sprints classification ===
Final intermediate sprints classification (1–8)
| | Name | Team | Points |
|---|---|---|---|
| 1 | Rik Van Steenbergen (BEL) | Girardengo | 113 |
| 2 | Rino Benedetti (ITA) | Legnano | 45 |
| 3 | Giorgio Albani (ITA) | Legnano | 42 |
| 4 | Guido De Santi (ITA) | Bottecchia | 29 |
| 5 | Adolfo Grosso (ITA) | Atala | 25 |
| 6 | Giovanni Pettinati (ITA) | Torpado | 20 |
| 7 | Giovanni Corrieri (ITA) | Bartali | 19 |
| 8 | Renzo Soldani (ITA) | Doniselli | 18 |
| 8 | Hilaire Couvreur (BEL) | Girardengo | 18 |
| 8 | Renato Ponzini (ITA) | Arbos | 18 |

=== Team classification ===
Final team classification (1–10)
| | Team | Points |
|---|---|---|
| 1 | Girardengo | 152 |
| 2 | Legnano | 101 |
| 3 | Bottecchia | 71 |
| 4 | Arbos | 61 |
| 5 | Torpado | 47 |
| 6 | Bianchi | 45 |
| 7 | Atala | 43 |
| 8 | Locomotif | 40 |
| 9 | Doniselli-Lansetina | 34 |
| 10 | Nivea-Fuchs | 30 |

== Aftermath ==
Following the race, a Nouvelliste Valaisan writer described how non-Italian riders dominated the race by winning 11 of the 22 stage, while having 35 foreigners riding to 75 Italians starting the race. The writer acknowledged that some critics felt Italian cycling was beginning to decline as the "Big Three" Bartali, Coppi, and Magni would be soon exiting the sport; however, the writer noted that Giancarlo Astrua, Nino Defilippis, Pasquale Fornara, among others would help maintain Italian cycling's presence. In particular, the writer felt the younger riders attacked more and forced the older riders out of their reserves quicker than expected. The writer concluded that the Swiss riders have earned respect from their peers and become favorites entering races now, while stating that the Swiss riders that will contest the upcoming Tour de France will have a lengthy time off to rest before its start because of the 1954 FIFA World Cup. A Nouvelliste Valaisan writer wrote that large attacks were expected on the 21st stage which featured the Bernina pass; however, the attacks did not come, which at the time they speculated it was due to fatigue of the riders. Due to the low effort by the riders and slow stage speed, race organizers cut the prize money on the stage by half. The Italian Cycling Federation was so unhappy with what they perceived as a strike, that they did not send an Italian team to the 1954 Tour de France. Later this inaction by the peloton on the 21st stage became known as the "Bernina strike." Another Nouvelliste Valaisan writer described the collective performance by the Swiss riders as the best in the nation's history at the Giro, as three finished in the top 12 of the general classification.
