= 1953 Giro d'Italia =

Race details
- Dates: 12 May - 2 June 1953
- Stages: 21
- Distance: 4,035.5 km (2,508 mi)
- Winning time: 118h 37' 26"

Results
Jersey awarded to the overall winner	Winner	Fausto Coppi (ITA)	(Bianchi)
	Second	Hugo Koblet (SUI)	(Cilo)
	Third	Pasquale Fornara (ITA)	(Cilo)
	Mountains	Pasquale Fornara (ITA)	(Cilo)
	Team	Ganna	

The 1953 Giro d'Italia was the 36th edition of the Giro d'Italia. The Giro started off in Milan on 12 May with a 263 km (163.4 mi) flat stage and concluded back in Milan with a 220 km (136.7 mi) relatively flat mass-start stage on 2 June. Sixteen teams entered the race, which was won by Italian Fausto Coppi of the Bianchi team. Second and third respectively were Swiss rider Hugo Koblet and Italian Pasquale Fornara.

Hugo Koblet held the pink jersey up until the penultimate stage, when Coppi attacked and left him behind on the climb up the Stelvio Pass (included in the Giro for the first time), taking the lead and securing the final victory. Since then the Stelvio Pas is par excellence the Cima Coppi of the competition.

== Teams ==
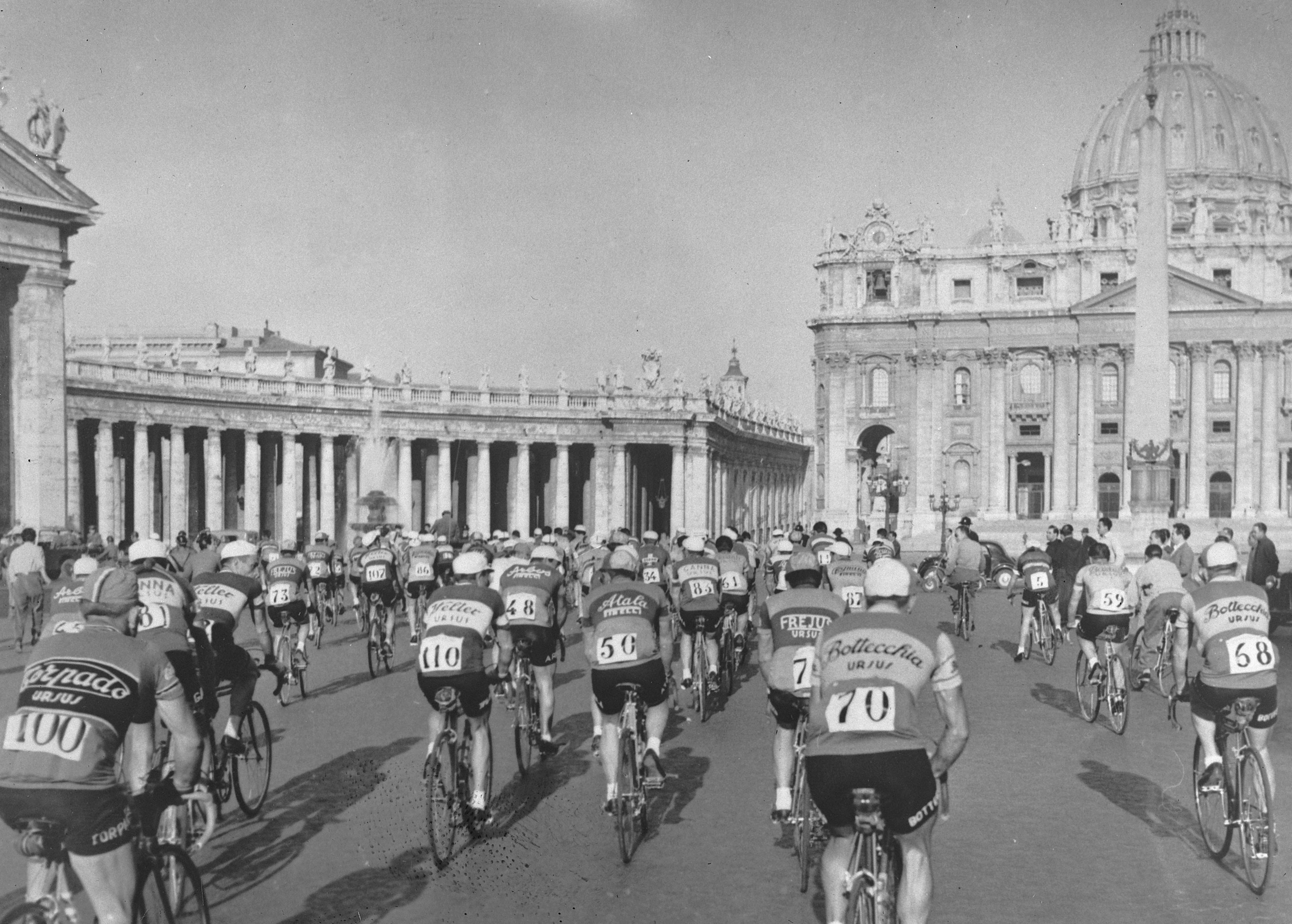
The peloton riding through St. Peter's Square during the tenth stage of the race.

Sixteen teams were invited by the race organizers to participate in the 1953 edition of the Giro d'Italia. Like the Tour de France the teams were nation based for the first time at the Giro, with each national team being sponsored by an Italian brand. Each team sent a squad of seven riders, which meant that the race started with a peloton of 112 cyclists. From the riders that began the race, 72 made it to the finish in Milan. In total there were 35 foreign riders that started the race.

The teams entering the race were:

- Arbos
- Atala
- Bartali
- Bianchi
- Bottecchia
- Fiorelli
- Francia
- Fréjus
- Ganna
- Girardengo
- Guerra
- Legnano
- Levirere
- Locomotief
- Torpado–Ursus
- Welter

== Pre-race favorites ==
The "Big Three" of Gino Bartali (Bartali), Fausto Coppi (Bianchi), and Fiorenzo Magni (Ganna) were expected to dominate the general classification. A La Liberté writer felt that young riders Giancarlo Astrua (Atala), Nino Defilippis (Legnano), Pasquale Fornara (Bottecchia), and climber Bruno Monti (Arbos) would be exciting to watch throughout the race to see their potential. French rider and Swiss riders were thought to be very strong, while Spanish riders Bernardo Ruiz and Michel Gual were thought to be their country's best riders. Swiss rider and former Giro winner Hugo Koblet (Cilo) was regarded as being in sensational form entering the Giro, coming off a win at the Tour de Romandie. Taking that into account with his good health, the media felt Koblet could be the one to challenge Coppi best.

A notable absence from the race was Bianchi rider Loretto Petrucci who had won the previous two Milan–San Remo, who was not brought to the race because of his young age according to his team; however, he had previously raced in 1951 and 1952. A La Sentinelle writer believed that Petrucci's omission from the race was due to Petrucci's desire to race for victories and not for the team leader Coppi.

== Route and stages ==
On 26 March, the route was announced to be from 12 May to 28 May. It was later rumored on 30 March, that the race may include the Olympic stadium. The full route was later unveiled on 9 April 1953, with a changed finale on the 2 June. The race route featured 20 days of racing spread across 22 days as 20 May in Pisa and 27 May in San Pellegrino were set aside as rest days. For the first time since 1937, a team time trial was included. The rules for this team time trial were copied from the Tour de France: the time for each team was determined by the third rider that crossed the finish line.

In some overviews, the two stages of 18 May were seen as a split stage, named 7A and 7B; stages 9--21 are labeled 8--20 in those overviews.

Stage characteristics and results
Stage	Date	Course	Distance	Type	Winner
1	12 May	Milan to Abano Terme	263 km (163 mi)	Plain stage	Wim Van Est (NED)
2	13 May	Abano Terme to Rimini	278 km (173 mi)	Stage with mountain(s)	Pasquale Fornara (ITA)
3	14 May	Rimini to San Benedetto del Tronto	182 km (113 mi)	Plain stage	Albino Crespi (ITA)
4	15 May	San Benedetto del Tronto to Roccaraso	171 km (106 mi)	Stage with mountain(s)	Fausto Coppi (ITA)
5	16 May	Roccaraso to Naples	149 km (93 mi)	Plain stage	Ettore Milano (ITA)
6	17 May	Naples to Rome	285 km (177 mi)	Plain stage	Giuseppe Minardi (ITA)
7	18 May	Rome to Grosseto	178 km (111 mi)	Plain stage	Giovanni Corrieri (ITA)
8	18 May	Grosseto to Follonica	48 km (30 mi)	Individual time trial	Hugo Koblet (SUI)
9	19 May	Follonica to Pisa	114 km (71 mi)	Plain stage	Rik Van Steenbergen (BEL)
	20 May	Rest day			
10	21 May	Pisa to Modena	189 km (117 mi)	Stage with mountain(s)	Fiorenzo Magni (ITA)
11	22 May	Modena to Modena	30 km (19 mi)	Team time trial	Bianchi
12	23 May	Modena to Genoa	278 km (173 mi)	Plain stage	Giorgio Albani (ITA)
13	24 May	Genoa to Bordighera	256 km (159 mi)	Stage with mountain(s)	Oreste Conte (ITA)
14	25 May	Bordighera to Turin	242 km (150 mi)	Plain stage	Pietro Giudici (ITA)
15	26 May	Turin to San Pellegrino Terme	232 km (144 mi)	Plain stage	Nino Assirelli (ITA)
	27 May	Rest day			
16	28 May	San Pellegrino Terme to Riva del Garda	279 km (173 mi)	Stage with mountain(s)	Fiorenzo Magni (ITA)
17	29 May	Riva del Garda to Vicenza	166 km (103 mi)	Plain stage	Bruno Monti (ITA)
18	30 May	Vicenza to Auronzo di Cadore	186 km (116 mi)	Plain stage	Bruno Monti (ITA)
19	31 May	Auronzo di Cadore to Bolzano	164 km (102 mi)	Stage with mountain(s)	Fausto Coppi (ITA)
20	1 June	Bolzano to Bormio	125 km (78 mi)	Stage with mountain(s)	Fausto Coppi (ITA)
21	2 June	Bormio to Milan	220 km (137 mi)	Plain stage	Fiorenzo Magni (ITA)
	Total		4,035.5 km (2,508 mi)		

== Race overview ==
The race started outside the Piazza del Duomo in Milan. Ferdinand Kübler withdrew from the race early on due to disputes.

== Classification leadership ==
The leader of the general classification – calculated by adding the stage finish times of each rider – wore a pink jersey. This classification is the most important of the race, and its winner is considered as the winner of the Giro. There were no time bonuses in the 1953 Giro. Riders were allowed to have teammates and team cars help to following accidents and punctures. "Strollers" in years past were punished with small fines, but in this edition of the race they were punished by time adjustments and repeat offenses may lead to disqualification from the race. The winner of the race received 1 million lire, while the remainder of the podium received 450,000 lire each.

Two additional jerseys were in use. The green jersey was given to the best foreign cyclist in the general classification; at the end of the Giro it was worn by Swiss Hugo Koblet. The white jersey was given to the best cyclist riding with a licence for independents; this was won by Angelo Conterno. The winner of each classification earned 500,000 lire, and it would be the last year that independents and foreign riders had a special classification with a jersey.

The mountains classification leader was not identified by a special jersey. For this classifications, designated mountain passes gave points to the first five riders to pass the summit, from five points down to one point. The winner of the mountains classification was given 400,000 lire.

Although no jersey was awarded, there was also one classification for the teams, in which the stage finish times of the best three cyclists per team were added; the leading team was the one with the lowest total time. The team winning team received 2.5 million lire.

Each day leading the general classification earned the rider and his team 100,000 lira, while the independent rider and foreign rider earned 25,000 lira each day for leading their respective classifications.

In 1953, the Giro also decided to use a combativity award and a bad luck award after every stage, copying the Tour de France.

Classification leadership by stage
Stage	Winner	General classification	Best foreign rider	Best independent rider	Mountains classification	Team classification
1	Wim van Est	Wim van Est	Wim van Est	Alfo Ferrari	not awarded	Locomotief
2	Pasquale Fornara	Guido De Santi	Hugo Koblet	Elio Brasola	Pasquale Fornara	Levriere
3	Albino Crespi	Guido De Santi	Hugo Koblet	Elio Brasola	Pasquale Fornara	Levriere
4	Fausto Coppi	Pasquale Fornara	Louison Bobet	Elio Brasola	Pasquale Fornara	Bianchi & Francia
5	Ettore Milano	Pasquale Fornara	Louison Bobet	Elio Brasola	Pasquale Fornara	Bianchi & Francia
6	Giuseppe Minardi	Guido De Santi	Hugo Koblet	Elio Brasola	Pasquale Fornara	Bianchi & Francia
7	Giovanni Corrieri	Giovanni Corrieri	Hugo Koblet	Arrigo Padovan	Pasquale Fornara	Bianchi & Francia
8	Hugo Koblet	Hugo Koblet	Hugo Koblet	Elio Brasola	Pasquale Fornara	Bartali
9	Rik Van Steenbergen	Hugo Koblet	Hugo Koblet	Elio Brasola	Pasquale Fornara	Bartali
10	Fiorenzo Magni	Hugo Koblet	Hugo Koblet	Elio Brasola	Pasquale Fornara	Bianchi
11	Bianchi	Hugo Koblet	Hugo Koblet	Elio Brasola	Pasquale Fornara	Bartali
12	Giorgio Albani	Hugo Koblet	Hugo Koblet	Elio Brasola	Pasquale Fornara	Bartali
13	Oreste Conte	Hugo Koblet	Hugo Koblet	Elio Brasola	Pasquale Fornara	Bartali
14	Pietro Giudici	Hugo Koblet	Hugo Koblet	Angelo Conterno	Pasquale Fornara	Bartali
15	Nino Assirelli	Hugo Koblet	Hugo Koblet	Angelo Conterno	Pasquale Fornara	Bottecchia
16	Fiorenzo Magni	Hugo Koblet	Hugo Koblet	Angelo Conterno	Pasquale Fornara	Ganna
17	Bruno Monti	Hugo Koblet	Hugo Koblet	Angelo Conterno	Pasquale Fornara	Ganna
18	Bruno Monti	Hugo Koblet	Hugo Koblet	Angelo Conterno	Pasquale Fornara	Ganna
19	Fausto Coppi	Hugo Koblet	Hugo Koblet	Angelo Conterno	Pasquale Fornara	Ganna
20	Fausto Coppi	Fausto Coppi	Hugo Koblet	Angelo Conterno	Pasquale Fornara	Ganna
21	Fiorenzo Magni	Fausto Coppi	Hugo Koblet	Angelo Conterno	Pasquale Fornara	Ganna
Final		Fausto Coppi	Hugo Koblet	Angelo Conterno	Pasquale Fornara	Ganna

== Final standings ==
Legend
A pink jersey	Denotes the winner of the General classification
A white jersey	Denotes the best independent rider
A green jersey	Denotes the best foreign rider

=== General classification ===
Final general classification (1–10)
Rank	Name	Team	Time
1	Fausto Coppi (ITA)	Bianchi	118h 37' 26"
2	Hugo Koblet (SUI)	Guerra	+ 1' 26"
3	Pasquale Fornara (ITA)	Bottecchia	+ 6' 55"
4	Gino Bartali (ITA)	Bartali	+ 14' 08"
5	Angelo Conterno (ITA)	Fréjus	+ 20' 51"
6	Stan Ockers (BEL)	Girardengo	+ 24' 14"
7	Giovanni Roma (ITA)	Bottecchia	+ 24' 35"
8	Guido De Santi (ITA)	Benotto	+ 25' 06"
9	Fiorenzo Magni (ITA)	Ganna	+ 25' 39"
10	Vincenzo Rossello (ITA)	Ganna	+ 26' 21"

=== Independent rider classification ===
Final Independent rider classification (1–5)
Rank	Name	Time
1	Angelo Conterno (ITA)	118h 58' 17"
2	Giovanni Roma (ITA)	+ 3 '44"
3	Pietro Giudici (ITA)	+ 8' 11"
4	Donato Zampini (ITA)	+ 11' 03"
5	Arrigo Padovan (ITA)	+ 12' 32"

=== Foreign rider classification ===
Final Foreign rider classification (1–5)
Rank	Name	Team	Time
1	Hugo Koblet (SUI)	Guerra	118h 38' 55"
2	Stan Ockers (BEL)	Girardengo	+ 22' 45"
3	Wim van Est (NED)	Holland	+ 28' 28"
4	Fritz Schaer (SUI)	Guerra	+ 28' 57"
5	Roger Pontet (FRA)	France	+ 52' 56"

=== Mountains classification ===
Final mountains classification (1–9)
	Name	Team	Points
1	Pasquale Fornara (ITA)	Bottecchia	33
2	Fausto Coppi (ITA)	Bianchi	20
3	Gino Bartali (ITA)	Bartali	16
4	Hugo Koblet (SUI)	Guerra	15
5	Primo Volpi (ITA)	Arbos	10
6	Andrea Carrea (ITA)	Bianchi	8
7	Stan Ockers (BEL)	Girardengo	5
8	Danilo Barozzi (ITA)	Atala	4
9	Nino Defilippis (ITA)	Legnano	3
9	Giovanni Roma (ITA)	Bottecchia	3

=== Team classification ===
Final team classification (1-10)
	Team	Time
1	Ganna	357h 13' 20"
2	Bottecchia	+ 7' 21"
3	Bianchi	+ 10' 51"
4	Legnano	+ 37' 59"
5	Bartali	+ 39' 00"
6	Fréjus	+ 49' 47"
7	Svizzera-Guerra	+ 1h 01' 12"
8	Levrieri	+ 1h 05' 23"
9	Arbos	+ 1h 11' 58"
10	Atala	+ 1h 33' 11"

The award for most combative rider of the Giro was given to Guido De Santi.
