= 1960 La Flèche Wallonne =

Race details
- Dates: 9 May 1960
- Stages: 1
- Distance: 208 km (129.2 mi)
- Winning time: 5h 41' 35"

Results
	Winner	Pino Cerami (BEL)	(Peugeot–BP–Dunlop)
	Second	Pierre Beuffeuil (FRA)	(Mercier–BP–Hutchinson)
	Third	Constant Goossens (BEL)	(Peugeot–BP–Dunlop)

The 1960 La Flèche Wallonne was the 24th edition of La Flèche Wallonne cycle race and was held on 9 May 1960. The race started in Liège and finished in Charleroi. The race was won by Pino Cerami of the Peugeot team.

== General classification ==
Final general classification

Rank	Rider	Team	Time
1	Pino Cerami (BEL)	Peugeot–BP–Dunlop	5h 41' 35"
2	Pierre Beuffeuil (FRA)	Mercier–BP–Hutchinson	+ 27"
3	Constant Goossens (BEL)	Peugeot–BP–Dunlop	+ 27"
4	Robert Cazala (FRA)	Mercier–BP–Hutchinson	+ 27"
5	Jean Forestier (FRA)	Helyett–Leroux–Fynsec–Hutchinson	+ 27"
6	Alfons Hermans (BEL)	Dr. Mann–Dossche Sport	+ 35"
7	Tom Simpson (GBR)	Rapha–Gitane–Dunlop	+ 2' 21"
8	Rik Van Looy (BEL)	Faema	+ 2' 53"
9	René Vanderveken (BEL)	Peugeot–BP–Dunlop	+ 3' 12"
10	Emile Daems (BEL)	Philco	+ 3' 52"
