= 1958 Tour de Romandie =

Race details
- Dates: 8–11 May 1958
- Stages: 4
- Distance: 825.4 km (512.9 mi)
- Winning time: 24h 04' 50"

Results
	Winner	Gilbert Bauvin (FRA)
	Second	Pino Cerami (BEL)
	Third	Giovanni Pettinati (ITA)

The 1958 Tour de Romandie was the 12th edition of the Tour de Romandie cycle race and was held from 8 May to 11 May 1958. The race started and finished in Porrentruy. The race was won by Gilbert Bauvin.

== General classification ==
Final general classification
Rank	Rider	Time
1	Gilbert Bauvin (FRA)	24h 04' 50"
2	Pino Cerami (BEL)	+ 17"
3	Giovanni Pettinati (ITA)	+ 1' 43"
4	Raymond Impanis (BEL)	+ 2' 12"
5	Heinz Graf (SUI)	+ 2' 32"
6	Marcel Janssens (BEL)	+ 2' 42"
7	Tino Sabbadini (FRA)	+ 3' 07"
8	Adriano De Gasperi (ITA)	+ 3' 24"
9	Marcel Rohrbach (FRA)	+ 3' 40"
10	Hansruedi Dubach (SUI)	+ 3' 40"
