= 1960 Paris–Roubaix =

Race details
- Dates: 10 April 1960
- Stages: 1
- Distance: 262.5 km (163.1 mi)
- Winning time: 6h 01' 45"

Results
| | Winner | Pino Cerami (BEL) | (Peugeot–BP–Dunlop) |
| | Second | Tino Sabbadini (FRA) | (Mercier–BP–Hutchinson) |
| | Third | Miguel Poblet (ESP) | (Helyett–Leroux–Fynsec–Hutchinson) |

The 1960 Paris–Roubaix was the 58th edition of the Paris-Roubaix bicycle race and was held on 10 April 1960. The race started in Compiègne and finished in Roubaix. The race was won by Pino Cerami of the Peugeot team.

== General classification ==
Final general classification

| Rank | Rider | Team | Time |
|---|---|---|---|
| 1 | Pino Cerami (BEL) | Peugeot–BP–Dunlop | 6h 01' 45" |
| 2 | Tino Sabbadini (FRA) | Mercier–BP–Hutchinson | + 14" |
| 3 | Miguel Poblet (ESP) | Ignis | + 55" |
| 4 | Jean Forestier (FRA) | Helyett–Leroux–Fynsec–Hutchinson | + 55" |
| 5 | Henri De Wolf (BEL) | Helyett–Leroux–Fynsec–Hutchinson | + 55" |
| 6 | Frans Aerenhouts (BEL) | Mercier–BP–Hutchinson | + 55" |
| 7 | Gilbert Desmet (BEL) | Carpano | + 55" |
| 8 | Jacques Anquetil (FRA) | Helyett–Leroux–Fynsec–Hutchinson | + 55" |
| 9 | Tom Simpson (GBR) | Rapha–Gitane–Dunlop | + 1' 03" |
| 10 | Raymond Impanis (BEL) | Faema | + 1' 11" |
