= 1962 La Flèche Wallonne =

Race details
- Dates: 7 May 1962
- Stages: 1
- Distance: 201 km (124.9 mi)
- Winning time: 5h 41' 28"

Results
| | Winner | Henri De Wolf (BEL) | (Gitane–Leroux–Dunlop–R. Geminiani) |
| | Second | Pino Cerami (BEL) | (Peugeot–BP–Dunlop) |
| | Third | Hans Junkermann (FRG) | (Torpedo) |

The 1962 La Flèche Wallonne was the 26th edition of La Flèche Wallonne cycle race and was held on 7 May 1962. The race started in Liège and finished in Charleroi. The race was won by Henri De Wolf of the Gitane team.

== General classification ==
Final general classification

| Rank | Rider | Team | Time |
|---|---|---|---|
| 1 | Henri De Wolf (BEL) | Gitane–Leroux–Dunlop–R. Geminiani | 5h 41' 28" |
| 2 | Pino Cerami (BEL) | Peugeot–BP–Dunlop | + 2" |
| 3 | Hans Junkermann (FRG) | Torpedo | + 3" |
| 4 | Armand Desmet (BEL) | Flandria–Faema–Clément | + 17" |
| 5 | Martin Van Geneugden (BEL) | Flandria–Faema–Clément | + 19" |
| 6 | Jean Forestier (FRA) | Gitane–Leroux–Dunlop–R. Geminiani | + 52" |
| 7 | Rolf Wolfshohl (FRG) | Gitane–Leroux–Dunlop–R. Geminiani | + 1' 02" |
| 8 | Jo de Haan (NED) | Gitane–Leroux–Dunlop–R. Geminiani | + 2' 50" |
| 9 | Piet van Est (NED) | Flandria–Faema–Clément | + 2' 52" |
| 10 | Jozef Schils (BEL) | Mercier–BP–Hutchinson | + 2' 55" |
