= 1957 Tour de Romandie =

Cycling race

Race details
- Dates: 9–12 May 1957
- Stages: 4
- Distance: 766.7 km (476.4 mi)
- Winning time: 20h 09' 47"

Results
	Winner	Jean Forestier (FRA)
	Second	Guido Carlesi (ITA)
	Third	Hugo Koblet (SUI)

The 1957 Tour de Romandie was the 11th edition of the Tour de Romandie cycle race and was held from 9 May to 12 May 1957. The race started and finished in Lausanne. The race was won by Jean Forestier.

== General classification ==
Final general classification
Rank	Rider	Time
1	Jean Forestier (FRA)	20h 09' 47"
2	Guido Carlesi (ITA)	+ 15"
3	Hugo Koblet (SUI)	+ 1' 04"
4	Rolf Graf (SUI)	+ 1' 17"
5	Attilio Moresi (SUI)	+ 1' 28"
6	Albert Bouvet (FRA)	+ 1' 41"
7	Francis Pipelin (FRA)	+ 1' 56"
8	André Darrigade (FRA)	+ 2' 19"
9	André Vlayen (BEL)	+ 2' 41"
10	René Strehler (SUI)	+ 3' 04"
