= Tour de Romandie =

Swiss multi-day road cycling race

Race details
- Date: April–May
- Region: Romandie, Switzerland
- English name: Tour of Romandy
- Local name: Tour de Romandie (in French)
- Discipline: Road
- Competition: UCI World Tour
- Type: Major one week stage race
- Web site: www.tourderomandie.ch

History
- First edition: 1947
- Editions: 79 (as of 2026)
- First winner: Désiré Keteleer (BEL)
- Most wins: Stephen Roche (IRL) (3 wins)
- Most recent: Tadej Pogačar (SLO)

The Tour de Romandie is a stage race that is part of the UCI World Tour. It runs through the Romandie region, or French-speaking part of Switzerland. The competition began in 1947, to coincide with the 50-year anniversary of Swiss Cycling. It was held without interruption until the COVID-19 pandemic caused the cancellation of the 2020 edition.

The course of the race usually heads northwards towards the Jura Mountains and Alpine mountain ranges of western Switzerland. The race traditionally starts with an individual time trial prologue and ends with an individual time-trial in hilly terrains, often in Lausanne. The final time-trial traditionally starts in the stadium north of Lausanne, goes downhill southwards to Lake Léman (Lake Geneva), and makes its way back uphill to the stadium again. The winner and several of the top-ten finishers are usually excellent time trialists.

Five winners of the Tour de Romandie have gone on to win the Tour de France in the same year; Stephen Roche in 1987, then Cadel Evans, Bradley Wiggins, Chris Froome in 2011, 2012 and 2013, respectively, and Tadej Pogačar

Tour de Romandie is also usually considered a preparation race for the Giro d'Italia, which starts one week later.

In 2022, the Tour de Romandie Féminin was held for the first time in the UCI Women's World Tour – as part of the 75th anniversary celebrations of the race.

== Winners ==
Year	Country	Rider	Team
1947	Belgium	Désiré Keteleer	
1948	Switzerland	Ferdinand Kübler	
1949	Italy	Gino Bartali	
1950	France	Édouard Fachleitner	
1951	Switzerland	Ferdinand Kübler	
1952	Netherlands	Wout Wagtmans	
1953	Switzerland	Hugo Koblet	
1954	France	Jean Forestier	
1955	Switzerland	René Strehler	
1956	Italy	Pasquale Fornara	
1957	France	Jean Forestier	
1958	France	Gilbert Bauvin	
1959	Switzerland	Kurt Gimmi	
1960	France	Louis Rostollan	
1961	France	Louis Rostollan	
1962	Italy	Guido De Rosso	Molteni
1963	Belgium	Willy Bocklant	
1964	Switzerland	Rolf Maurer	
1965	Italy	Vittorio Adorni	
1966	Italy	Gianni Motta	Molteni
1967	Italy	Vittorio Adorni	
1968	Belgium	Eddy Merckx	Faema
1969	Italy	Felice Gimondi	Salvarani
1970	Sweden	Gösta Pettersson	Ferretti
1971	Italy	Gianni Motta	Salvarani
1972	France	Bernard Thévenet	Peugeot–BP–Michelin
1973	Belgium	Wilfried David	Flandria–Carpenter–Shimano
1974	Netherlands	Joop Zoetemelk	Gitane
1975	Spain	Francisco Galdós	Kas–Kaskol
1976	Belgium	Johan De Muynck	Brooklyn
1977	Italy	Gianbattista Baronchelli	Scic
1978	Netherlands	Johan van der Velde	TI–Raleigh
1979	Italy	Giuseppe Saronni	Scic–Bottecchia
1980	France	Bernard Hinault	Renault–Elf–Gitane
1981	Sweden	Tommy Prim	Bianchi
1982	Norway	Jostein Wilmann	Capri Sonne
1983	Ireland	Stephen Roche	Peugeot–Shell–Michelin
1984	Ireland	Stephen Roche	La Redoute
1985	Switzerland	Jörg Müller	Skil–Sem
1986	Belgium	Claude Criquielion	Hitachi
1987	Ireland	Stephen Roche	Carrera Jeans–Vagabond
1988	Netherlands	Gerard Veldscholten	Weinmann-La Suisse
1989	Australia	Phil Anderson	TVM
1990	France	Charly Mottet	RMO
1991	Switzerland	Toni Rominger	Toshiba
1992	United States	Andrew Hampsten	Motorola
1993	Switzerland	Pascal Richard	Ariostea
1994	Switzerland	Pascal Richard	GB–MG Maglificio
1995	Switzerland	Toni Rominger	Mapei–GB–Latexco
1996	Spain	Abraham Olano	Mapei–GB
1997	Russia	Pavel Tonkov	Mapei–GB
1998	Switzerland	Laurent Dufaux	Festina–Lotus
1999	France	Laurent Jalabert	ONCE–Deutsche Bank
2000	Italy	Paolo Savoldelli	Saeco–Valli & Valli
2001	Italy	Dario Frigo	Fassa Bortolo
2002	Italy	Dario Frigo	Tacconi Sport
2003	United States	Tyler Hamilton	Team CSC
2004	United States	Tyler Hamilton	Phonak
2005	Colombia	Santiago Botero	Phonak
2006	Australia	Cadel Evans	Davitamon–Lotto
2007	Netherlands	Thomas Dekker	Rabobank
2008	Germany	Andreas Klöden	Astana
2009	Czech Republic	Roman Kreuziger	Liquigas
2010	Slovenia	Simon Špilak	Lampre–Farnese Vini
2011	Australia	Cadel Evans	BMC Racing Team
2012	Great Britain	Bradley Wiggins	Team Sky
2013	Great Britain	Chris Froome	Team Sky
2014	Great Britain	Chris Froome	Team Sky
2015	Russia	Ilnur Zakarin	Team Katusha
2016	Colombia	Nairo Quintana	Movistar Team
2017	Australia	Richie Porte	BMC Racing Team
2018	Slovenia	Primož Roglič	LottoNL–Jumbo
2019	Slovenia	Primož Roglič	Team Jumbo–Visma
2020	No race due to COVID-19 pandemic		
2021	Great Britain	Geraint Thomas	INEOS Grenadiers
2022		Aleksandr Vlasov^{[a]}	Bora–Hansgrohe
2023	Great Britain	Adam Yates	UAE Team Emirates
2024	Spain	Carlos Rodríguez	INEOS Grenadiers
2025	Portugal	João Almeida	UAE Team Emirates XRG
2026	Slovenia	Tadej Pogačar	UAE Team Emirates XRG

=== Multiple winners ===
Wins	Rider	Editions
3	Stephen Roche (IRL)	1983 + 1984 + 1987
2	Ferdinand Kübler (SUI)	1948 + 1951
2	Jean Forestier (FRA)	1954 + 1957
2	Louis Rostollan (FRA)	1960 + 1961
2	Vittorio Adorni (ITA)	1965 + 1967
2	Gianni Motta (ITA)	1966 + 1971
2	Tony Rominger (SUI)	1991 + 1995
2	Pascal Richard (SUI)	1993 + 1994
2	Dario Frigo (ITA)	2001 + 2002
2	Tyler Hamilton (USA)	2003 + 2004
2	Cadel Evans (AUS)	2006 + 2011
2	Chris Froome (GBR)	2013 + 2014
2	Primož Roglič (SLO)	2018 + 2019

=== Wins per country ===
Wins	Country
13	Italy
12	Switzerland
10	France
6	Belgium
5	Great Britain; Netherlands
4	Australia; Slovenia
3	Ireland; Spain; United States
2	Colombia; Russia; Sweden
1	Czech Republic; Germany; Norway; Portugal

=== Most stage wins ===
#	Rider	Stage wins
1	Mario Cipollini (ITA)	12
2	Hugo Koblet (SUI)	8
2	Ferdinand Kübler (SUI)	8
4	Vittorio Adorni (ITA)	6
4	Michael Albasini (SUI)	6
4	Knut Knudsen (NOR)	6
4	Gianni Motta (ITA)	6
4	Tony Rominger (SUI)	6
4	Johan van der Velde (NED)	6
10	Laurent Dufaux (SUI)	5
10	Urs Freuler (SUI)	5
10	Pascal Richard (SUI)	5
10	Giuseppe Saronni (ITA)	5
10	Paolo Savoldelli (ITA)	5

== Media coverage ==
The Tour de Romandie is broadcast throughout Europe and in other areas:

- United Kingdom — Discovery+
- United States — FloBikes

== Notes ==
^{a} As of 1 March 2022, the UCI announced that cyclists from Russia and Belarus would no longer compete under the name or flag of those respective countries due to the Russian invasion of Ukraine.

== See also ==
- List of highest paved roads in Switzerland
