= 1955 Tour de Romandie =

Race details
- Dates: 5–8 May 1955
- Stages: 4
- Distance: 815 km (506 mi)
- Winning time: 22h 35' 03"

Results
	Winner	René Strehler (SUI)
	Second	Hugo Koblet (SUI)
	Third	Max Schellenberg (SUI)

The 1955 Tour de Romandie was the ninth edition of the Tour de Romandie cycle race and was held from 5 May to 8 May 1955. The race started and finished in Monthey. The race was won by René Strehler.

== General classification ==
Final general classification
Rank	Rider	Time
1	René Strehler (SUI)	22h 35' 03"
2	Hugo Koblet (SUI)	+ 3' 04"
3	Max Schellenberg (SUI)	+ 3' 17"
4	Bruno Monti (ITA)	+ 3' 51"
5	Carlo Clerici (SUI)	+ 4' 43"
6	Charly Gaul (LUX)	+ 4' 45"
7	Pasquale Fornara (ITA)	+ 4' 57"
8	Jean Forestier (FRA)	+ 5' 54"
9	Marcel Fernandez (FRA)	+ 6' 12"
10	Jean Malléjac (FRA)	+ 6' 47"
