= 1956 La Flèche Wallonne =

Race details
- Dates: 5 May 1956
- Stages: 1
- Distance: 221 km (137.3 mi)
- Winning time: 6h 03' 55"

Results
	Winner	Richard Van Genechten (BEL)
	Second	Sante Ranucci (ITA)
	Third	André Vlayen (BEL)

The 1956 La Flèche Wallonne was the 20th edition of La Flèche Wallonne cycle race and was held on 5 May 1956. The race started in Charleroi and finished in Liège. The race was won by Richard Van Genechten.

== General classification ==
Final general classification

Rank	Rider	Time
1	Richard Van Genechten (BEL)	6h 03' 55"
2	Sante Ranucci (ITA)	+ 50"
3	André Vlayen (BEL)	+ 1' 07"
4	Stan Ockers (BEL)	+ 1' 07"
5	Jef Planckaert (BEL)	+ 1' 07"
6	Roland Callebout (BEL)	+ 1' 07"
7	André Rosseel (BEL)	+ 1' 07"
8	André Auquier (BEL)	+ 1' 07"
9	Gérard Deborre (BEL)	+ 1' 07"
10	Pino Cerami (BEL)	+ 1' 07"
