= 1956 Tour de Suisse =

Race details
- Dates: 16–23 June 1956
- Stages: 8
- Distance: 1,645 km (1,022 mi)
- Winning time: 47h 05' 02"

Results
	Winner	Rolf Graf (SUI)
	Second	Fritz Schär (SUI)
	Third	Jef Planckaert (BEL)

The 1956 Tour de Suisse was the 20th edition of the Tour de Suisse cycle race and was held from 16 June to 23 June 1956. The race started and finished in Zürich. The race was won by Rolf Graf.

== General classification ==
Final general classification

Rank	Rider	Time
1	Rolf Graf (SUI)	47h 05' 02"
2	Fritz Schär (SUI)	+ 4' 59"
3	Jozef Planckaert (BEL)	+ 7' 46"
4	Hans Hollenstein (SUI)	+ 10' 17"
5	Hans Junkermann (FRG)	+ 12' 17"
6	Vincenzo Rossello (ITA)	+ 17' 32"
7	René Strehler (SUI)	+ 19' 57"
8	Pietro Nascimbene (ITA)	+ 20' 46"
9	Brian Robinson (GBR)	+ 23' 25"
10	Ugo Massocco (ITA)	+ 24' 31"
