= Herselt =

- Municipality
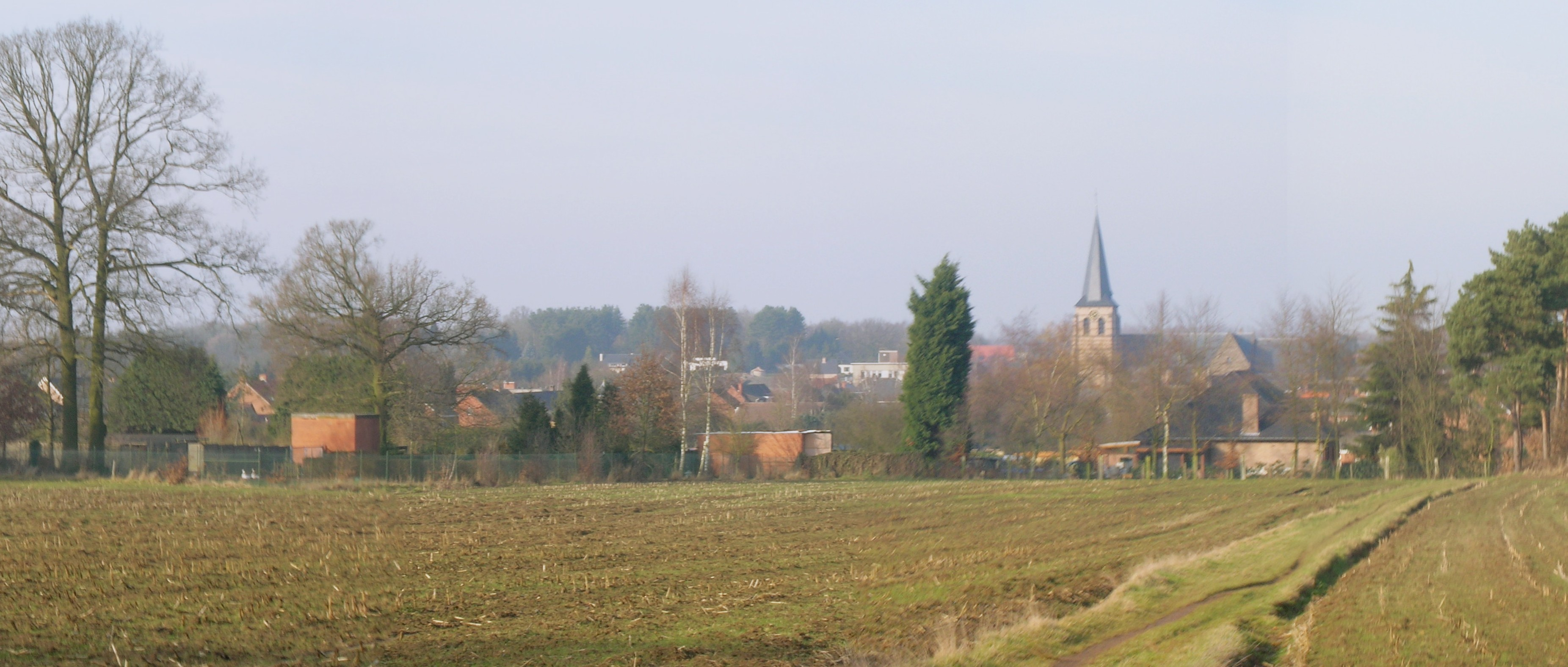

- Flag Coat of arms

- Location of Herselt in the province of Antwerp
- Interactive map of Herselt
- Location in Belgium
- Coordinates: 51°03′N 04°53′E
- Country: Belgium
- Community: Flemish Community
- Region: Flemish Region
- Province: Antwerp
- Arrondissement: Turnhout

Government
  - Mayor: Peter Keymeulen (N-VA)
  - Governing parties: N-VA, MENSEN MET MENSEN

Area
  - Total: 52.37 km^{2} (20.22 sq mi)

Population (2020-01-01)
  - Total: 14,521
  - Density: 277.3/km^{2} (718.1/sq mi)
- Postal codes: 2230
- NIS code: 13013
- Area codes: 014, 016, 013
- Website: www.herselt.be

Herselt (Dutch pronunciation: [ˈɦɛrsəlt]) is a municipality located in the Belgian province of Antwerp. The municipality comprises the towns of Herselt proper, Ramsel, Blauberg, Bergom and Varenwinkel. In 2021, Herselt had a total population of 14,649. The total area is 52.32 km^{2}.

== Born in Herselt ==
- Praga Khan, born Maurice Joseph François Engelen
- Stein Huysegems
- Gregorius Thiels, abbot of Averbode
- André Vlayen

== Gallery ==
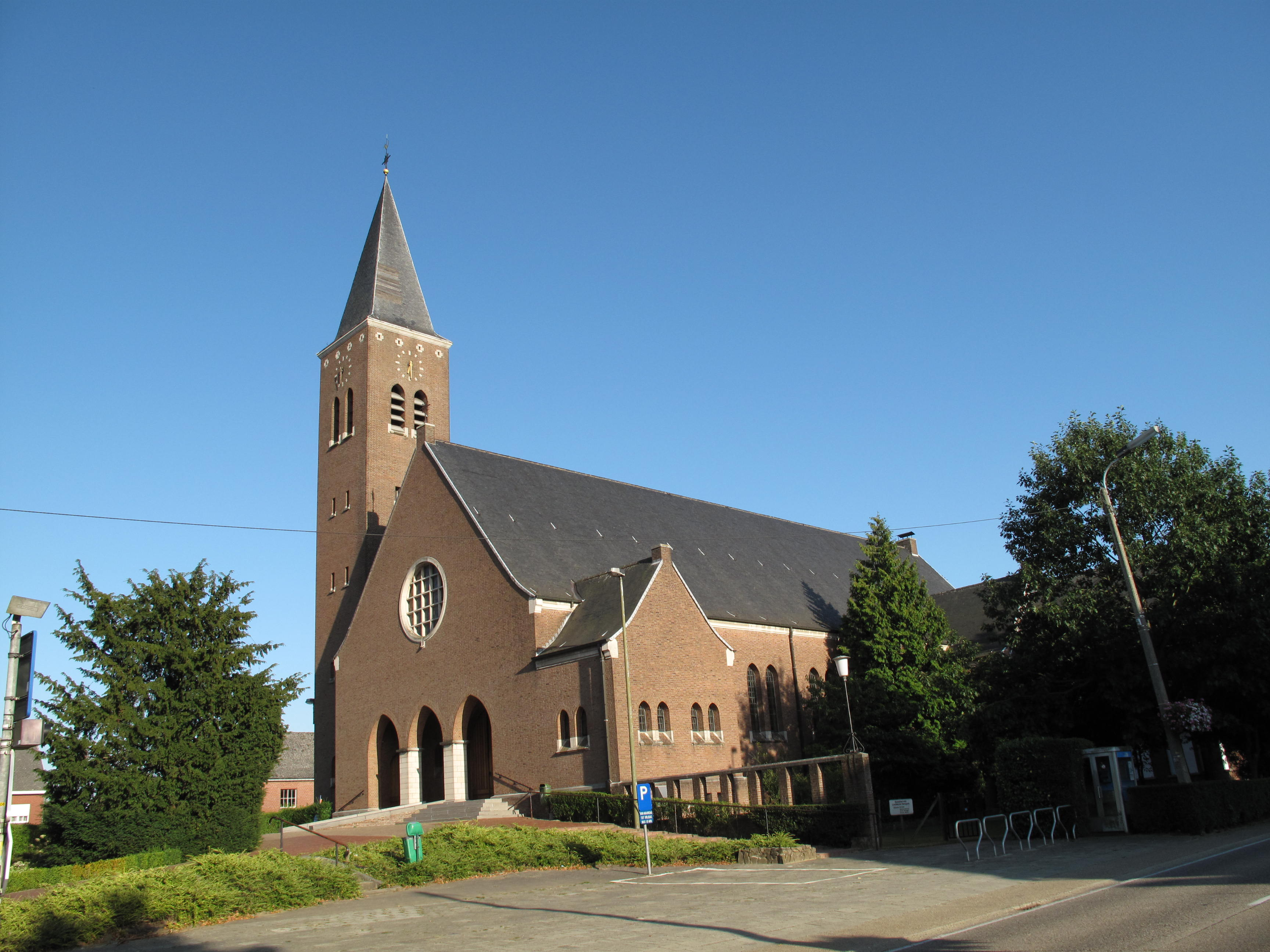
Bergom, church

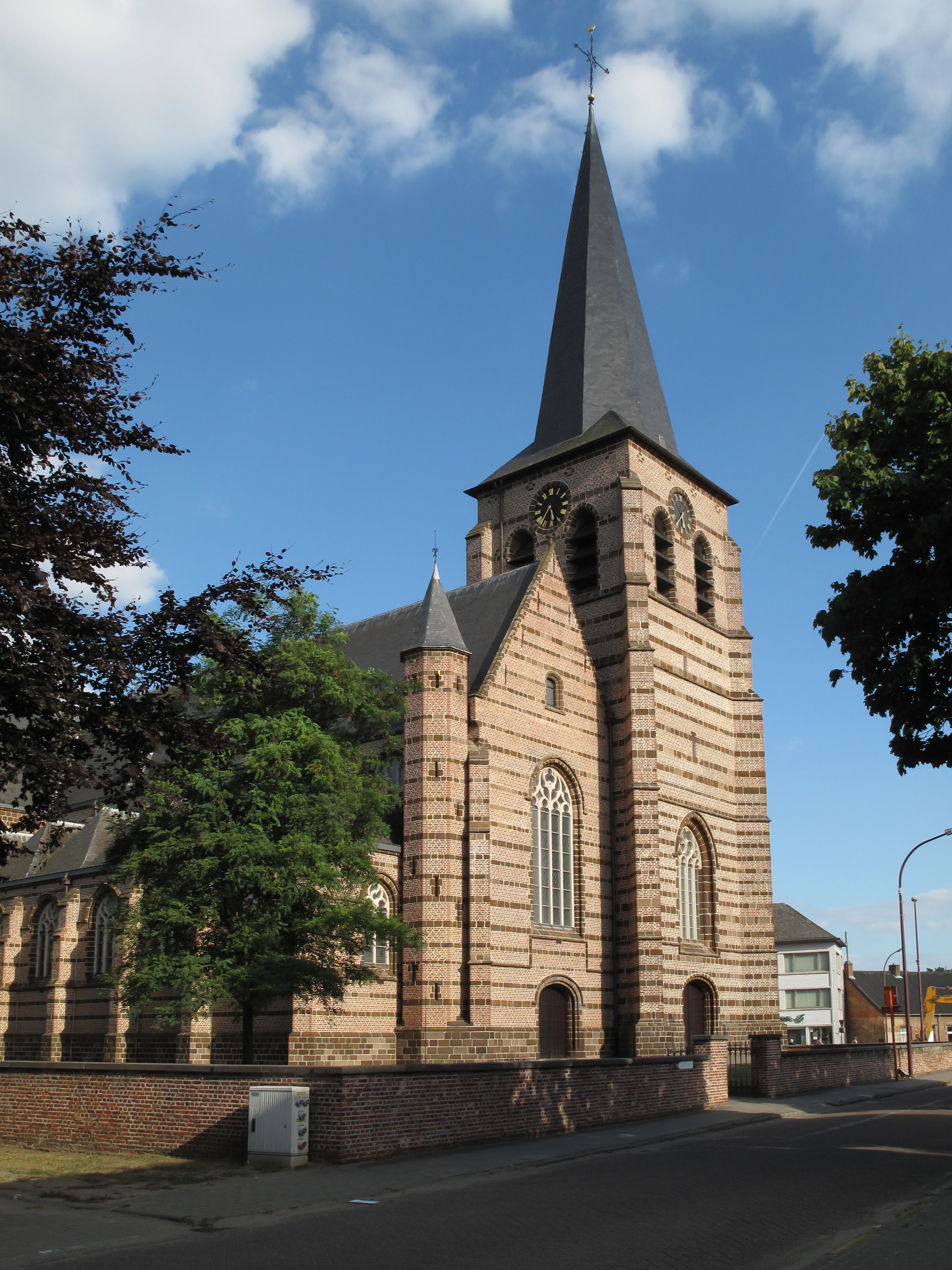
Herselt, church
