= 1955 La Flèche Wallonne =

Race details
- Dates: 30 April 1955
- Stages: 1
- Distance: 220 km (136.7 mi)
- Winning time: 6h 12' 20"

Results
| | Winner | Stan Ockers (BEL) |
| | Second | Alfons Van den Brande (BEL) |
| | Third | Stanislas Bober (FRA) |

The 1955 La Flèche Wallonne was the 19th edition of La Flèche Wallonne cycle race and was held on 30 April 1955. The race started in Charleroi and finished in Liège. The race was won by Stan Ockers.

== General classification ==
Final general classification

| Rank | Rider | Time |
|---|---|---|
| 1 | Stan Ockers (BEL) | 6h 12' 20" |
| 2 | Alfons Van den Brande (BEL) | + 2' 46" |
| 3 | Stanislas Bober (FRA) | + 2' 46" |
| 4 | Brian Robinson (GBR) | + 2' 46" |
| 5 | Jan Adriaensens (BEL) | + 2' 46" |
| 6 | Pierre Molinéris (FRA) | + 2' 55" |
| 7 | Jean Brankart (BEL) | + 5' 35" |
| 8 | Eugenio Bertoglio (ITA) | + 6' 01" |
| 9 | Germain Derycke (BEL) | + 6' 04" |
| 10 | Rik Van Steenbergen (BEL) | + 6' 04" |
