= Carlo Clerici =

Swiss cyclist (1929–2007)

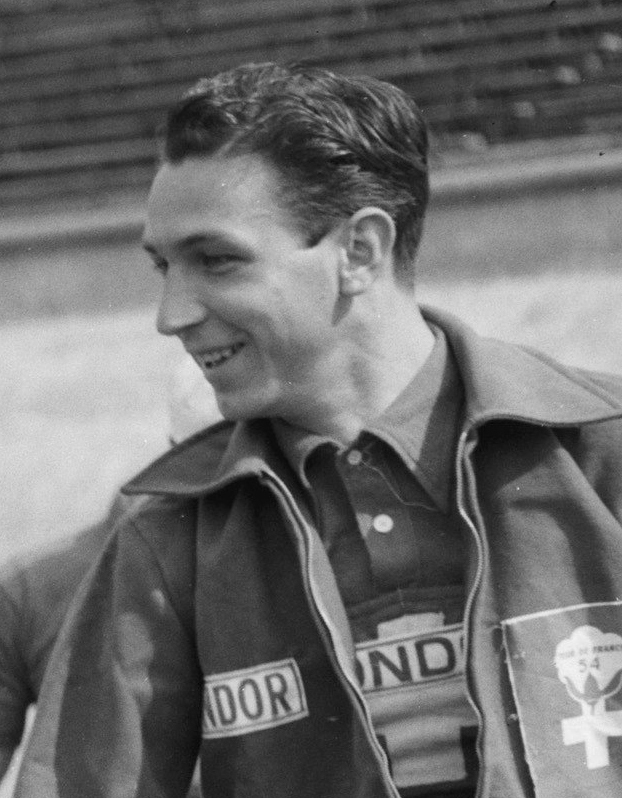

Personal information
- Born: 3 September 1929 Zürich, Switzerland
- Died: 28 January 2007 (aged 77) Zürich, Switzerland

Cycling career
- Sport: Cycling
- Current team: Retired
- Discipline: Road
- Role: Rider

Professional teams
- 1951: Frejus/Welter/Condor
- 1952: Guerra/Welter/Condor/Rapier
- 1953–1954: Welter/Condor
- 1954: Guerra/Condor
- 1955–1956: Faema/Condor
- 1957: Condor/Helyett

Major wins
- Grand Tours Giro d'Italia General classification (1954) 1 individual stage (1954) One-day races and Classics Züri-Metzgete (1956)

Carlo Clerici (3 September 1929 – 28 January 2007) was a Swiss professional road bicycle racer.

The highlight of his career was his overall win in the 1954 Giro d'Italia.

== Major results ==
1950
3rd Stausee-Rundfahrt Klingnau
1952
1st GP de Suisse
2nd Züri-Metzgete
2nd GP du Locle
2nd Rund um Altdorf
3rd Overall Tour de Suisse
10th Overall Tour de Romandie
1953
2nd Rund um Altdorf
3rd Züri-Metzgete
4th Overall Tour de Suisse
6th Overall Tour de Romandie
7th Giro del Ticino
1954
1st Overall Giro d'Italia

1st Stage 6

1st GP du Locle
3rd Road race, National Road Championships
3rd Overall Tour de Romandie
4th Züri-Metzgete
1955
2nd Road race, National Road Championships
3rd Overall Tour de Suisse
4th Züri-Metzgete
4th Genoa–Nice
5th Overall Tour de Romandie
1956
1st Züri-Metzgete
1st GP du Locle
2nd Overall Tour de Romandie
9th Giro dell'Emilia
1957
7th Overall Tour de Suisse

=== Grand Tour general classification results timeline ===
Grand Tour	1952	1953	1954	1955	1956	1957
Giro d'Italia	23	—	1	26	DNF	—
Tour de France	—	—	12	DNF	—	DNF
Vuelta a España	—	—	—	—	—	—

Legend
—	Did not compete
DNF	Did not finish
