= 1950 Tour de Romandie =

Race details
- Dates: 18–21 May 1950
- Stages: 4
- Distance: 867 km (539 mi)
- Winning time: 24h 28' 54"

Results
	Winner	Édouard Fachleitner (FRA)
	Second	Hugo Koblet (SUI)
	Third	Kléber Piot (FRA)

The 1950 Tour de Romandie was the fourth edition of the Tour de Romandie cycle race and was held from 18 May to 21 May 1950. The race started and finished in Geneva. The race was won by Édouard Fachleitner.

== General classification ==
Final general classification
Rank	Rider	Time
1	Édouard Fachleitner (FRA)	24h 28' 54"
2	Hugo Koblet (SUI)	+ 51"
3	Kléber Piot (FRA)	+ 3' 40"
4	Ferdinand Kübler (SUI)	+ 5' 43"
5	Robert Bonnaventure (FRA)	+ 6' 29"
6	Martin Metzger (SUI)	+ 8' 47"
7	Jean Robic (FRA)	+ 17' 48"
8	Georges Aeschlimann (SUI)	+ 19' 05"
9	Jean Brun (SUI)	+ 29' 25"
10	Silvio Pedroni (ITA)	+ 40' 05"
