= 1953 Giro di Lombardia =

Race details
- Dates: October 25, 1953
- Stages: 1
- Distance: 222 km (137.9 mi)
- Winning time: 6h 01' 50"

Results
	Winner	Bruno Landi (ITA)	(Fiorelli)
	Second	Pino Cerami (ITA)	(Peugeot-Dunlop)
	Third	Pierre Molinéris (FRA)	(Fiorelli)

The 1953 Giro di Lombardia cycling race took place on October 25, 1953, and was won by Fiorelli's Bruno Landi. It was the 47th edition of the Giro di Lombardia "monument" classic race.

== General classification ==
	Cyclist	Team	Time
1	Bruno Landi (ITA)	Fiorelli	6h 01' 50"
2	Pino Cerami (ITA)	Peugeot-Dunlop	m. t.
3	Pierre Molinéris (FRA)	Fiorelli	m. t.
4	Stan Ockers (BEL)	Peugeot-Dunlop	m. t.
5	Angelo Conterno (ITA)	Frejus	m. t.
6	Jan de Valck (BEL)	Garin-Wolber	m. t.
7	Fiorenzo Magni (ITA)	Ganna-Ursus	m. t.
8	Donato Zampini (ITA)	Benotto-Levrieri	m. t.
9	Bruno Monti (ITA)	Arbos	m. t.
10	Mino de Rossi (ITA)	Bianchi-Pirelli	m. t.
