= Albino Crespi =

Italian cyclist

Personal information
- Born: 30 January 1930
- Died: 23 October 1994 (aged 64)

Cycling career
- Sport: Cycling
- Role: Rider

Albino Crespi (30 January 1930 – 23 October 1994) was an Italian racing cyclist. He won stage 3 of the 1953 Giro d'Italia.
