= Pino Cerami =

Belgian-Italian cyclist (1922–2014)

- Cerami while at Peugeot-BP-Dunlop around 1960

Personal information
- Full name: Giuseppe Cerami
- Nickname: Pino
- Born: 28 April 1922 Misterbianco, Sicily, Italy
- Died: 20 September 2014 (aged 92)

Cycling career
- Sport: Cycling
- Discipline: Road
- Role: Rider
- Rider type: Classics specialist

Amateur team
- 1937–45: -

Professional teams
- 1946–1947: Independent
- 1948: Metropole-Dunlop
- 1949–1954: Peugeot-Dunlop
- 1955–1956: Elvé-Peugeot
- 1957: Peugeot-BP
- 1958: Elvé-Peugeot-Marvan
- 1959–1962: Peugeot-BP-Dunlop
- 1963: Peugeot-BP

Major wins
- Grand Tours Tour de France 1 individual stage (1963) Other stage races Tour of Belgium (1957) One-day races and Classics Paris–Roubaix (1960) La Flèche Wallonne (1960) Brabantse Pijl (1961) Paris–Brussels (1961)
Medal record
Men's road bicycle racing
Representing Belgium
World Championships
| Bronze medal – third place | 1960 Karl Marx Stadt | Elite Men's Road Race |

Giuseppe "Pino" Cerami (28 April 1922 – 20 September 2014) was a Belgian road bicycle racer. He joined the professional peloton in 1946 as an independent. Born in Misterbianco, Sicily, Italy he was naturalised as a Belgian on 16 March 1956.

Cerami won the 1960 Paris–Roubaix Classic with Tino Sabbadini of France second and Miguel Poblet of Spain in third place. Cerami also won La Flèche Wallonne Classic in 1960. He was 3rd in the 1960 World Championship Road Race behind Rik Van Looy of Belgium and Frenchman André Darrigade. At the 1963 Tour de France, Cerami won the 9th stage at 41 years old; Cerami is the oldest Tour de France stage winner ever.

Since 1964 the Grand Prix Pino Cerami professional cycling race has taken place every year in Belgium. Cerami died on 20 September 2014 after a long illness.

== Major results ==
1948
1st GP Frans Melckenbeeck
3rd Dokter Tistaertprijs Zottegem
7th Giro di Lombardia
8th overall Critérium du Dauphiné Libéré
9th La Flèche Wallonne
1949
4th La Flèche Wallonne
6th Liège–Bastogne–Liège
1950
1st Championship of Hainaut
2nd GP Brabant Wallon
9th Milan–San Remo
1951
1st Tour du Doubs
1st Stages 3 & 5 Tour of Belgium
7th overall Critérium du Dauphiné Libéré
1952
3rd Dokter Tistaertprijs Zottegem
3rd Heistse Pijl
4th overall Tour de Suisse
7th overall Tour of Belgium
7th Omloop Het Volk
1953
1st Flèche Halloise
2nd Giro di Lombardia
3rd overall Tour of Belgium
3rd Dokter Tistaertprijs Zottegem
10th overall Tour de Suisse
1954
1st Ninove
1st Stages 12, 13 & 14 (TTT) Tour d'Europe 1954
3rd Tour de Hesbaye
4th Dwars door België
7th overall Tour of Belgium
10th Liège–Bastogne–Liège
1955
1st Stage 5 Tour de l'Ouest
1st GP Lucien Van Impe
2nd Nationale Sluitingsprijs
2nd Memorial Fred De Bruyne
3rd Dokter Tistaertprijs Zottegem
1956
2nd Ronde van Brabant
7th Liège–Bastogne–Liège
10th La Flèche Wallonne
1957
1st Overall Tour of Belgium

1st Stage 1

2nd Omloop Het Volk
3rd Nokere Koerse
8th Bordeaux–Paris
1958
1st Stage 2 Tour de Picardie
2nd Paris–Brussels
2nd Tour de Romandie
2nd Bordeaux–Paris
3rd Grand Prix des Ardennes
6th Giro di Lombardia
6th Gent–Wevelgem
7thOmloop Het Volk
8th Tour of Flanders
1959
1st Grand Prix de la Famenne
3rd overall Tour de Luxembourg

1st Stage 3

7th Bordeaux–Paris
1960
1st Paris–Roubaix
1st Flèche Wallonne
2nd Super Prestige Pernod
2nd Tour de Wallonie
3rd Road race, UCI World Championships
5th Bordeaux–Paris
1961
1st Paris–Brussels
1st Brabantse Pijl
1st Tour de Wallonie
1st Antwerpen-Ougrée
8th Bordeaux–Paris
1962
1st Tour de Wallonie
1st Championship of Hainaut
1st Antwerpen-Ougrée
1st Grand Prix de la Basse-Sambre
2nd Flèche Wallonne
1963
1st Stage 9 Tour de France
2nd Liège–Bastogne–Liège
2nd Weekend ardennais
2nd Tour du Doubs
2nd Trophée Stan Ockers
6th Flèche Wallonne
9th overall Tour of Belgium

=== Tour de France ===
- 1949 - did not finish
- 1957 - 35th
- 1958 - did not finish
- 1962 - 81st
- 1963 - did not finish; winner 9th stage
