= 1952 Tour de Romandie =

Race details
- Dates: 17–20 April 1952
- Stages: 4
- Distance: 832 km (517 mi)
- Winning time: 23h 46' 42"

Results
| | Winner | Wout Wagtmans (NED) |
| | Second | Hugo Koblet (SUI) |
| | Third | Raymond Impanis (BEL) |

The 1952 Tour de Romandie was the sixth edition of the Tour de Romandie cycle race and was held from 17 April to 20 April 1952. The race started and finished in Payerne. The race was won by Wout Wagtmans.

== General classification ==
Final general classification
| Rank | Rider | Time |
|---|---|---|
| 1 | Wout Wagtmans (NED) | 23h 46' 42" |
| 2 | Hugo Koblet (SUI) | + 1' 49" |
| 3 | Raymond Impanis (BEL) | + 1' 49" |
| 4 | Fausto Coppi (ITA) | + 8' 32" |
| 5 | Fritz Schär (SUI) | + 8' 32" |
| 6 | Giorgio Albani (ITA) | + 11' 44" |
| 7 | Donato Zampini (ITA) | + 13' 40" |
| 8 | Jeng Kirchen (LUX) | + 13' 46" |
| 9 | Jozef Schils (BEL) | + 15' 12" |
| 10 | Carlo Clerici (SUI) | + 16' 13" |
