= 1948 Critérium du Dauphiné Libéré =

Race details
- Dates: 1–6 June 1948
- Stages: 5
- Distance: 1,158 km (720 mi)
- Winning time: 33h 09' 56"

Results
	Winner	Édouard Fachleitner (FRA)	(La Perle)
	Second	Paul Giguet (FRA)	(Peugeot–Dunlop)
	Third	Jean Robic (FRA)	(Red team)
	Mountains	Jean Robic (FRA)	(Red team)
	Team	La Perle	

The 1948 Critérium du Dauphiné Libéré was the second edition of the cycle race and was held from 1 June to 6 June 1948. The race started and finished in Grenoble. The race was won by Édouard Fachleitner of the La Perle team.

== General classification ==
Final general classification

Rank	Rider	Team	Time
1	Édouard Fachleitner (FRA)	La Perle	33h 09' 56"
2	Paul Giguet (FRA)	Peugeot–Dunlop	+ 4' 02"
3	Jean Robic (FRA)	Red team	+ 4' 33"
4	Roger Lambrecht (BEL)	Stella	+ 4' 39"
5	Lucien Teisseire (FRA)	Metropole	+ 5' 25"
6	Robert Bonnaventure (FRA)	La Perle	+ 5' 49"
7	René Vietto (FRA)	France-Sport	+ 6' 17"
8	Pino Cerami (BEL)	Meteore	+ 6' 34"
9	Émile Rol (FRA)	La Perle	+ 6' 35"
10	Maurice Kallert (FRA)	Blue team	+ 7' 50"
