= 1955 Milan–San Remo =

Race details
- Dates: 19 March 1955
- Stages: 1
- Distance: 282 km (175 mi)
- Winning time: 7h 03' 46"

Results
	Winner	Germain Derycke (BEL)	(Alcyon–Dunlop)
	Second	Bernard Gauthier (FRA)	(Mercier–BP–Hutchinson)
	Third	Jean Bobet (FRA)	(Bobet–BP–Hutchinson)

The 1955 Milan–San Remo was the 46th edition of the Milan–San Remo cycle race and was held on 19 March 1955. The race started in Milan and finished in San Remo. The race was won by Germain Derycke of the Alcyon team.

== General classification ==
Final general classification

Rank	Rider	Team	Time
1	Germain Derycke (BEL)	Alcyon–Dunlop	7h 03' 46"
2	Bernard Gauthier (FRA)	Mercier–BP–Hutchinson	+ 1"
3	Jean Bobet (FRA)	Bobet–BP–Hutchinson	+ 3"
4	Mauro Gianneschi (ITA)	Arbos–Pirelli	+ 3"
5	Fiorenzo Magni (ITA)	Nivea–Fuchs	+ 26"
6	Rik Van Steenbergen (BEL)	Girardengo–Eldorado	+ 26"
7	Giorgio Albani (ITA)	Legnano	+ 26"
8	Gilbert Bauvin (FRA)	Saint-Raphaël–R. Geminiani–Dunlop	+ 26"
9	Raphaël Géminiani (FRA)	Saint-Raphaël–R. Geminiani–Dunlop	+ 26"
10	Bruno Monti (ITA)	Atala	+ 26"
