= Fritz Schär =

Swiss cyclist (1926–1997)

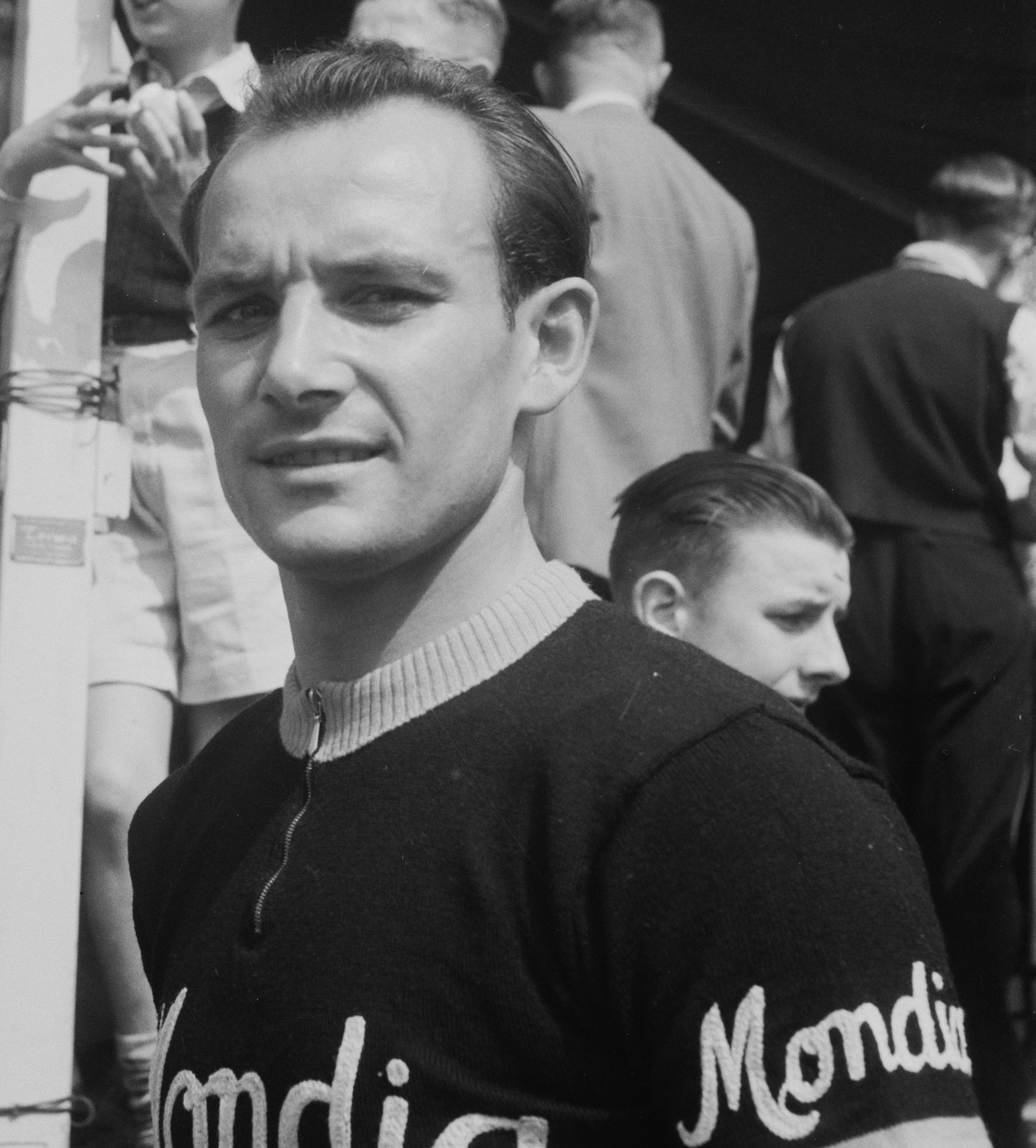

Personal information
- Full name: Fritz Schär
- Born: 13 March 1926 Kaltenbach, Switzerland
- Died: 29 September 1997 (aged 71) Frauenfeld, Switzerland

Cycling career
- Sport: Cycling
- Discipline: Road
- Role: Rider

Major wins
- Grand Tours Tour de France Points classification (1953) 2 individual stages (1953) Giro d'Italia 2 individual stages (1950, 1952) One-day races and Classics Züri-Metzgete (1949, 1950)
Medal record
Representing Switzerland
Men's road bicycle racing
World Championships
| Silver medal – second place | 1954 Solingen | Elite Men's Road Race |

Fritz Schär (13 March 1926 in Kaltenbach – 29 September 1997 in Frauenfeld) was a Swiss cyclist who in 1953 won the first points classification ever in the Tour de France. He also finished third in the general classification in the 1954 Tour de France. He was the Swiss National Road Race champion in 1953.

== Major results ==
1948
3rd Giro di Lombardia
1949
1st Züri-Metzgete
1st Stage 8 Tour de Suisse
4th Overall Tour de Romandie
1950
1st Züri-Metzgete
1st Stage 14 Giro d'Italia
1951
3rd Overall Tour de Romandie
4th Overall Tour de Suisse
1952
1st Stage 19 Giro d'Italia
5th Overall Tour de Romandie
7th Overall Tour de Suisse

1st Stage 2

1953
2nd Overall Tour de Suisse

1st Stage 1

4th Overall Tour de Romandie
6th Overall Tour de France

1st Points classification
1st Stages 1 & 2

1954
2nd Road race, UCI Road World Championships
3rd Overall Tour de France
4th Overall Tour de Romandie
9th Overall Giro d'Italia
1955
1st Stage 1 Tour de Suisse
1956
2nd Overall Tour de Suisse

1st Stage 7
