= 1958 Tour of Flanders =

42nd Tour of Flanders
Race details
- Dates: 30 March 1958
- Stages: 1
- Distance: 230 km (142.9 mi)
- Winning time: 6h 07'

Results
	Winner	Germain Derijcke (BEL)	(Carpano)
	Second	Willy Truye (BEL)	(Mercier–BP–Butchinson)
	Third	Angelo Conterno (ITA)	(Carpano)

The 42nd running of the Tour of Flanders cycling classic was held on Sunday, 30 March 1958. Belgian rider Germain Derijcke won the race in the sprint of a nine-man group in Wetteren. 61 of 153 riders finished.

== Route ==
The race started in Ghent and finished in Wetteren – covering 230 km. The course featured four categorized climbs:

- Kwaremont
- Kruisberg
- Berg Ten Stene
- Kloosterstraat (Geraardsbergen)

== Results ==
Result
Rank	Rider	Team	Time
1	Germain Derijcke (BEL)	Carpano	6h 07' 00"
2	Willy Truye (BEL)	Mercier–BP–Hutchinson	s.t.
3	Angelo Conterno (ITA)	Carpano	s.t.
4	Armand Desmet (BEL)	Groene Leeuw–Leopold	s.t.
5	Marcel Janssens (BEL)	Elve–Peugeot–Marvan	s.t.
6	Briek Schotte (BEL)	Libertas–Dr.Mann	s.t.
7	Nino Defilippis (ITA)	Carpano	s.t.
8	Pino Cerami (BEL)	Elve–Peugeot–Marvan	s.t.
9	Yvo Molenaers (BEL)	Groene Leeuw–Leopold	s.t.
10	Fred De Bruyne (BEL)	Carpano	+ 10"
