= 1951 Tour de Romandie =

Race details
- Dates: 3–6 May 1951
- Stages: 4
- Distance: 886 km (551 mi)
- Winning time: 24h 54' 13"

Results
	Winner	Ferdinand Kübler (SUI)
	Second	Hugo Koblet (SUI)
	Third	Fritz Schär (SUI)

The 1951 Tour de Romandie was the fifth edition of the Tour de Romandie cycle race and was held from 3 May to 6 May 1951. The race started and finished in Fribourg. The race was won by Ferdinand Kübler.

== General classification ==
Final general classification
Rank	Rider	Time
1	Ferdinand Kübler (SUI)	24h 54' 13"
2	Hugo Koblet (SUI)	+ 2' 56"
3	Fritz Schär (SUI)	+ 2' 56"
4	Martin Metzger (SUI)	+ 7' 44"
5	Fiorenzo Crippa (ITA)	+ 8' 54"
6	Andrea Carrea (ITA)	+ 9' 50"
7	Fritz Zbinden (SUI)	+ 14' 50"
8	Donato Zampini (ITA)	+ 15' 57"
9	Ettore Milano (ITA)	+ 21' 03"
10	Gottfried Weilenmann (SUI)	+ 21' 11"
