= 1952 Tour de Suisse =

Race details
- Dates: 14–21 June 1952
- Stages: 8
- Distance: 1,608 km (999.2 mi)
- Winning time: 46h 13' 25"

Results
	Winner	Pasquale Fornara (ITA)
	Second	Ferdinand Kübler (SUI)
	Third	Carlo Clerici (SUI)

The 1952 Tour de Suisse was the 16th edition of the Tour de Suisse cycle race and was held from 14 June to 21 June 1952. The race started and finished in Zürich. The race was won by Pasquale Fornara.

== General classification ==
Final general classification

Rank	Rider	Time
1	Pasquale Fornara (ITA)	46h 13' 25"
2	Ferdinand Kübler (SUI)	+ 4' 57"
3	Carlo Clerici (SUI)	+ 6' 56"
4	Pino Cerami (BEL)	+ 12' 49"
5	Pietro Giudici (ITA)	+ 15' 49"
6	Jean Goldschmit (LUX)	+ 19' 14"
7	Fritz Schär (SUI)	+ 20' 26"
8	Marcel De Mulder (BEL)	+ 20' 27"
9	André Brulé (FRA)	+ 21' 16"
10	Ugo Fondelli (ITA)	+ 22' 00"
