= Giovanni Pettinati =

Italian cyclist

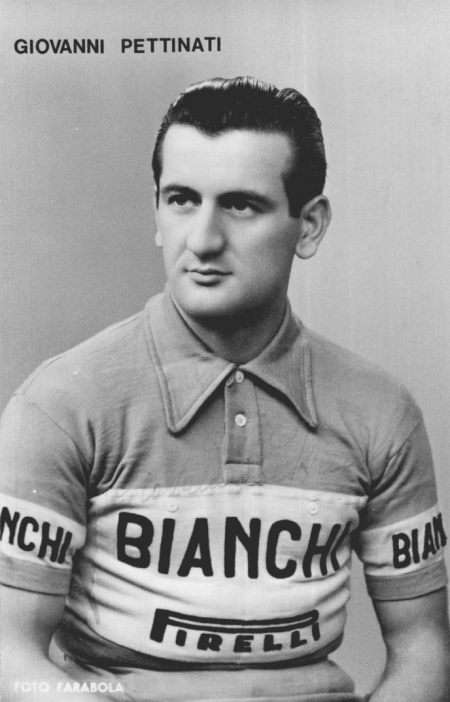
- Giovanni Pettinati in 1956

Personal information
- Born: 26 March 1926
- Died: 25 April 1994 (aged 68)

Cycling career
- Sport: Cycling
- Role: Rider

Giovanni Pettinati (26 March 1926 – 25 April 1994) was an Italian racing cyclist. He won stage 8 of the 1954 Giro d'Italia.
