= 1954 Tour de Romandie =

Race details
- Dates: 13–16 May 1954
- Stages: 4
- Distance: 790 km (490 mi)
- Winning time: 21h 16' 12"

Results
	Winner	Jean Forestier (FRA)
	Second	Pasquale Fornara (ITA)
	Third	Carlo Clerici (SUI)

The 1954 Tour de Romandie was the eighth edition of the Tour de Romandie cycle race and was held from 13 May to 16 May 1954. The race started and finished in Le Locle. The race was won by Jean Forestier.

== General classification ==
Final general classification
Rank	Rider	Time
1	Jean Forestier (FRA)	21h 16' 12"
2	Pasquale Fornara (ITA)	+ 2' 12"
3	Carlo Clerici (SUI)	+ 2' 50"
4	Fritz Schär (SUI)	+ 3' 07"
5	Marcel Huber (SUI)	+ 4' 08"
6	Alfredo Martini (ITA)	+ 7' 15"
7	Henri van Kerkhove (BEL)	+ 7' 41"
8	Josef Winterberg (SUI)	+ 9' 25"
9	Giancarlo Astrua (ITA)	+ 10' 50"
10	Max Schellenberg (SUI)	+ 12' 13"
