= Mauro Gianneschi =

Italian cyclist

Personal information
- Born: 3 August 1931
- Died: 21 January 2016 (aged 84)

Cycling career
- Sport: Cycling
- Role: Rider

Mauro Gianneschi (3 August 1931 – 21 January 2016) was an Italian racing cyclist. He won stage 11 of the 1954 Giro d'Italia.
