= 1955 Liège–Bastogne–Liège =

Race details
- Dates: 1 May 1955
- Stages: 1
- Distance: 238 km (148 mi)
- Winning time: 6h 50' 58"

Results
	Winner	Stan Ockers (BEL)
	Second	Raymond Impanis (BEL)
	Third	Jean Brankart (BEL)

The 1955 Liège–Bastogne–Liège was the 41st edition of the Liège–Bastogne–Liège cycle race and was held on 1 May 1955. The race started and finished in Liège. The race was won by Stan Ockers.

== General classification ==
Final general classification

Rank	Rider	Time
1	Stan Ockers (BEL)	6h 50' 58"
2	Raymond Impanis (BEL)	+ 0"
3	Jean Brankart (BEL)	+ 44"
4	Emiel Van Cauter (BEL)	+ 44"
5	Jan Adriaensens (BEL)	+ 1' 12"
6	Ernest Heyvaert (BEL)	+ 1' 12"
7	Marcel Ernzer (LUX)	+ 1' 40"
8	Jozef Schils (BEL)	+ 1' 40"
9	Pierre Molinéris (FRA)	+ 4' 07"
10	Alfred Krebs (GBR)	+ 4' 07"
