= 1953 Tour de Suisse =

Race details
- Dates: 17–27 June 1953
- Stages: 8
- Distance: 1,762 km (1,095 mi)
- Winning time: 50h 22' 11"

Results
	Winner	Hugo Koblet (SUI)
	Second	Fritz Schär (SUI)
	Third	Danilo Barozzi (ITA)

The 1953 Tour de Suisse was the 17th edition of the Tour de Suisse cycle race and was held from 17 June to 27 June 1953. The race started and finished in Zürich. The race was won by Hugo Koblet.

== General classification ==
Final general classification

Rank	Rider	Time
1	Hugo Koblet (SUI)	50h 22' 11"
2	Fritz Schär (SUI)	+ 18' 40"
3	Danilo Barozzi (ITA)	+ 23' 20"
4	Carlo Clerici (SUI)	+ 24' 28"
5	Pasquale Fornara (ITA)	+ 29' 11"
6	Nino Defilippis (ITA)	+ 29' 30"
7	Donato Zampini (ITA)	+ 30' 37"
8	Marcel Huber (SUI)	+ 32' 41"
9	Martin Metzger (SUI)	+ 35' 41"
10	Pino Cerami (BEL)	+ 41' 51"
