= Donato Zampini =

Italian cyclist

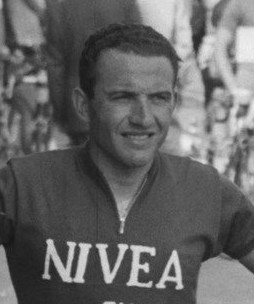
- Donato Zampini (1956)

Personal information
- Born: 10 December 1926 Saronno, Italy
- Died: 20 March 2007 (aged 80) Fagnano Olona, Italy

Cycling career
- Sport: Cycling
- Discipline: Road
- Role: Rider

Professional teams
- 1949: Legnano–Pirelli
- 1950–1051: Ganna–Superga
- 1951: Adria–Rennstall
- 1952: Tebag
- 1952–1953: Benotto–Fiorelli–Salus
- 1953: Torpado
- 1953–1954: Feru
- 1954: Bartali–Brooklin
- 1955: Fiorelli
- 1955: Tebag
- 1956: Nivea–Fuchs–Clément
- 1957: Ignis–Doniselli

Donato Zampini (10 December 1926 – 20 March 2007) was an Italian racing cyclist. He finished in fourth place in the 1952 Giro d'Italia.

== Major results ==
1947
2nd Coppa Agostoni
1950
1st Overall Giro di Sicilia
1st Stage 1 Giro dei Tre Mari
4th Giro di Lombardia
9th Milan–San Remo
1951
1st Stage 5 Giro di Sicilia
8th Overall Tour de Romandie
1952
2nd Overall Paris–Nice
4th Overall Giro d'Italia
5th Giro del Lazio
5th Giro del Ticino
7th Overall Tour de Romandie
1953
1st Giro del Ticino
3rd Milano–Torino
4th Giro dell'Emilia
5th Overall Tour de Romandie
7th Overall Volta a Catalunya

1st Stage 7

7th Overall Tour de Suisse
8th Giro di Lombardia
9th Tre Valli Varesine
1954
1st Stage 3 Tour de Suisse
1st Stage 4 Euskal Bizikleta
1st Stage 2 Vuelta a Asturias
9th Giro dell'Appennino
1955
4th Giro dell'Emilia
1958
6th Tre Valli Varesine
