= 1953 La Flèche Wallonne =

Race details
- Dates: 2 May 1953
- Stages: 1
- Distance: 220 km (136.7 mi)
- Winning time: 6h 24' 25"

Results
	Winner	Stan Ockers (BEL)
	Second	Ferdinand Kübler (SUI)
	Third	Loretto Petrucci (ITA)

The 1953 La Flèche Wallonne was the 17th edition of La Flèche Wallonne cycle race and was held on 2 May 1953. The race started in Charleroi and finished in Liège. The race was won by Stan Ockers.

== General classification ==
Final general classification

Rank	Rider	Time
1	Stan Ockers (BEL)	6h 24' 25"
2	Ferdinand Kübler (SUI)	+ 44"
3	Loretto Petrucci (ITA)	+ 44"
4	Jan De Valck (BEL)	+ 44"
5	Raymond Impanis (BEL)	+ 44"
6	Jan Storms (BEL)	+ 44"
7	Edward Peeters (BEL)	+ 44"
8	Alex Close (BEL)	+ 44"
9	Frans Gielen (BEL)	+ 44"
10	Robert Vanderstockt (BEL)	+ 44"
