= Bruno Landi (cyclist) =

Italian cyclist (1928–2005)

Personal information
- Born: 5 December 1928 Ameglia, Italy
- Died: 13 June 2005 (aged 76)

Cycling career
- Sport: Cycling
- Role: Rider

Bruno Landi (5 December 1928 – 13 June 2005) was an Italian racing cyclist. He won the 1953 edition of the Giro di Lombardia. Landi died on 13 June 2005, at the age of 76.
