= 1953 Tour de Romandie =

Race details
- Dates: 7–10 May 1953
- Stages: 4
- Distance: 827.5 km (514.2 mi)
- Winning time: 24h 07' 46"

Results
	Winner	Hugo Koblet (SUI)
	Second	Pasquale Fornara (ITA)
	Third	Louison Bobet (FRA)

The 1953 Tour de Romandie was the seventh edition of the Tour de Romandie cycle race and was held from 7 May to 10 May 1953. The race started and finished in Martigny. The race was won by Hugo Koblet.

== General classification ==
Final general classification
Rank	Rider	Time
1	Hugo Koblet (SUI)	24h 07' 46"
2	Pasquale Fornara (ITA)	+ 6' 05"
3	Louison Bobet (FRA)	+ 6' 47"
4	Fritz Schär (SUI)	+ 7' 33"
5	Donato Zampini (ITA)	+ 9' 13"
6	Carlo Clerici (SUI)	+ 9' 30"
7	Ferdinand Kübler (SUI)	+ 9' 40"
8	Gino Bartali (ITA)	+ 10' 25"
9	Eugen Kamber (SUI)	+ 11' 01"
10	Rolf Graf (SUI)	+ 11' 30"
