= 1955 Paris–Roubaix =

Cycling race

Race details
- Dates: 10 April 1955
- Stages: 1
- Distance: 249 km (154.7 mi)
- Winning time: 6h 06' 42"

Results
	Winner	Jean Forestier (FRA)
	Second	Fausto Coppi (ITA)
	Third	Louison Bobet (FRA)

The 1955 Paris–Roubaix was the 53rd edition of the Paris–Roubaix, a classic one-day cycle race in France. The single day event was held on 10 April 1955 and stretched 249 km (155 mi) from Paris to the finish at Roubaix Velodrome. The winner was Jean Forestier from France.

== Results ==
Final results (1–10)
Rank	Cyclist	Time
1	Jean Forestier (FRA)	6h 06' 42″
2	Fausto Coppi (ITA)	+0' 15″
3	Louison Bobet (FRA)	+0' 15″
4	Gilbert Scodeller (FRA)	+0' 15″
5	Raymond Impanis (BEL)	+0' 42″
6	Ernest Sterckx (BEL)	+0' 42″
7	Hugo Koblet (SUI)	+0' 42″
8	Bernard Gauthier (FRA)	+0' 42″
9	Jacques Dupont (FRA)	+1' 08″
10	Joseph Planckaert (BEL)	+1' 08″
