= Fiorelli =

Fiorelli is a fashion brand. The venture did not gain momentum until the large accessory company Oroton acquired the brand name. In 1988 Fiorelli Standard City Equipment was launched with a black and silver handbag collection aimed at the 15- to 25-year-old market, establishing the Fiorelli brand name within a niche market. Due to the brand's overwhelming success in Australia, Oroton saw fit to expand into Europe, specifically targeting the UK.

Fiorelli was first launched in the UK in 1990, with the present owners of the brand, The Lunan Group, taking over in 1995. The team at the Lunan Group, headed up by brothers Stuart and David Lunan saw the potential to re-invent the brand by broadening its appeal in the UK market.

Along with handbags, Fiorelli makes luggage, belts, small leather goods and sunglasses. The brand has nine standalone stores in the UK including Bluewater, Canary Wharf & East Midlands, and operates a thriving wholesale business to some of Great Britain's largest department stores as well as independent retailers.

In 2007 Gecko Jewellery was invited by Fiorelli to create two distinct lines of jewellery and create Fiorelli Jewellery brand. Fiorelli Silver collection is a range of sterling silver jewellery enhanced with rhodium with an emphasis on design. Fiorelli Silver is aimed at retail jewellers with high street premises. Fiorelli Costume Collection is a cheaper range that supposedly maintains a high quality production and design but uses cheaper materials such as imitation turquoise. Fiorelli Jewellery has a style not too dissimilar to the more expensive peer Ti Siento and it was only from 2009 that sales were permitted online (Fiorelli Costume Collection 1 debuted in 2007). There are typically two Fiorelli Costume collections released a year although the most popular lines from the last season may move into the next.
