= 1955 Tour de Suisse =

Race details
- Dates: 11–18 June 1955
- Stages: 8
- Distance: 1,648 km (1,024 mi)
- Winning time: 47h 27' 41"

Results
	Winner	Hugo Koblet (SUI)
	Second	Stan Ockers (BEL)
	Third	Carlo Clerici (SUI)

The 1955 Tour de Suisse was the 19th edition of the Tour de Suisse cycle race and was held from 11 June to 18 June 1955. The race started and finished in Zürich. The race was won by Hugo Koblet.

== General classification ==
Final general classification

Rank	Rider	Time
1	Hugo Koblet (SUI)	47h 27' 41"
2	Stan Ockers (BEL)	+ 5' 48"
3	Carlo Clerici (SUI)	+ 6' 16"
4	Ferdinand Kübler (SUI)	+ 8' 26"
5	Jean Brankart (BEL)	+ 8' 47"
6	Max Schellenberg (SUI)	+ 10' 03"
7	Arigo Padovan (ITA)	+ 16' 56"
8	Guido Boni (ITA)	+ 17' 16"
9	Marcel Huber (SUI)	+ 17' 57"
10	Jan Nolten (NED)	+ 18' 40"
