= Stan Ockers =

Belgian cyclist (1920–1956)

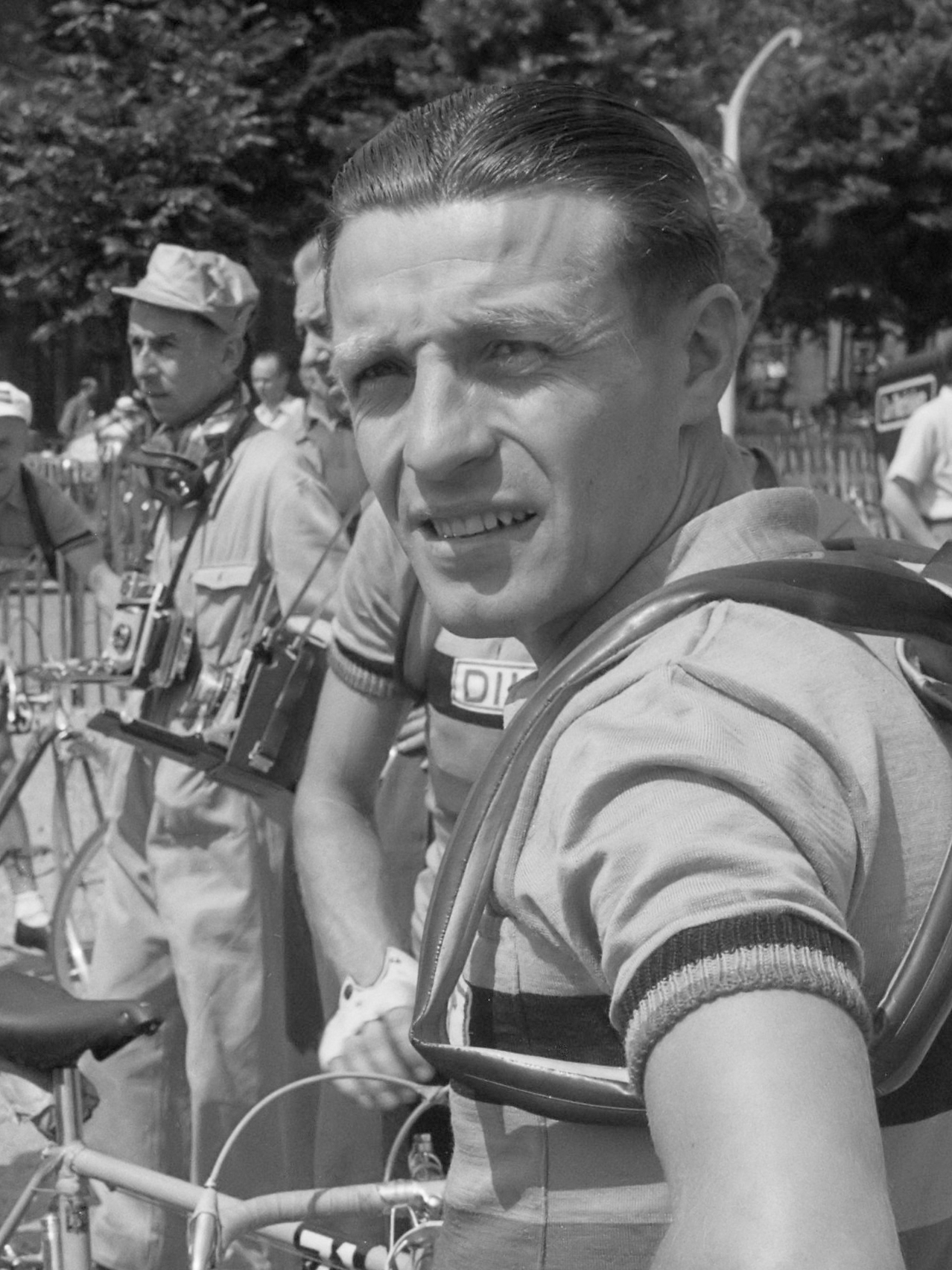
- Ockers at the 1951 Tour de France

Personal information
- Full name: Constant Ockers
- Born: 3 February 1920 Borgerhout, Belgium
- Died: 1 October 1956 (aged 36) Antwerp, Belgium

Cycling career
- Sport: Cycling
- Disciplines: Road; Track
- Role: Rider
- Rider type: Sprinter

Professional teams
- 1941: Individual
- 1942: Helyett–Hutchinson
- 1943–1945: Métropole
- 1946: Metropole–Dunlop
- 1947: Groene Leeuw
- 1947–1949: Mondia and Garin–Wolber
- 1950: Metropole–Dunlop and Terrot–Wolber
- 1951: Girardengo and Terrot–Wolber
- 1952–1954: Peugeot–Dunlop and Girardengo–Clement
- 1955–1956: Elvé–Peugeot
- 1956: Girardengo–Icep

Major wins
- Grand Tours Tour de France Points classification (1955, 1956) 4 individual stages (1950, 1954, 1956) Other stage races Roma–Napoli–Roma (1956) One-day races and Classics World Road Race Championships (1955) La Flèche Wallonne (1953, 1955) Liège–Bastogne–Liège (1955) Scheldeprijs (1941, 1946) Track Championships National Championships Madison (1955) Other Challenge Desgrange-Colombo (1955)
Medal record
Representing Belgium
Men's road bicycle racing
World Championships
Gold medal – first place	1955 Frascati	Professional road race
Bronze medal – third place	1953 Lugano	Professional road race

Constant ("Stan") Ockers (3 February 1920 – 1 October 1956) was a Belgian professional racing cyclist.

He was runner-up in the Tour de France in 1950 and 1952, and the top sprinter in that Grand Tour in 1955 and 1956. In 1955 he won the Classic "Ardennes double" by winning La Flèche Wallonne and the Liège–Bastogne–Liège in the same year. At this time, the races were run on successive days as "Le Weekend Ardennais". He also won the World Cycling Championship that year.

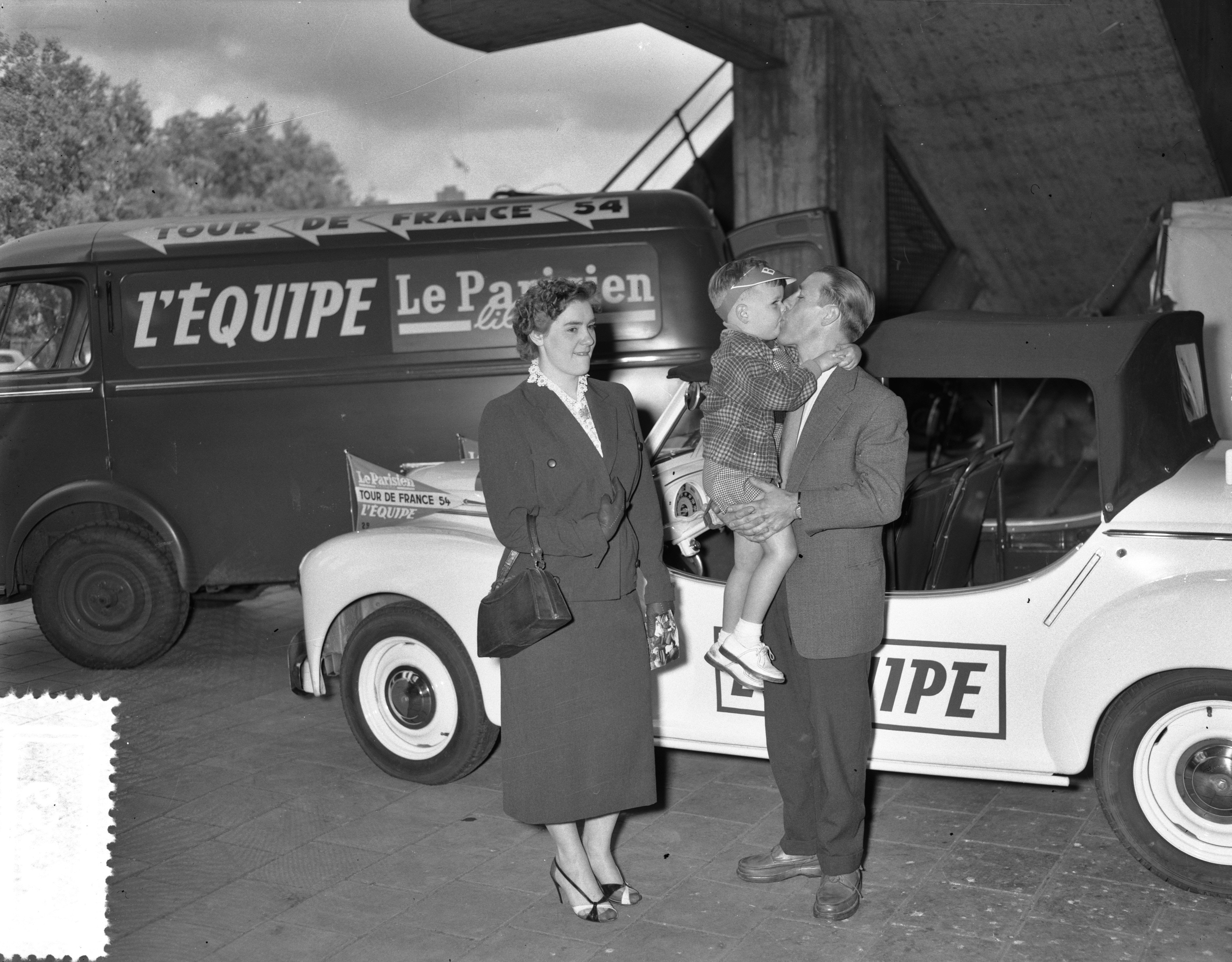
Ockers and family at the start of the 1954 Tour de France

Ockers' riding style was polarizing, and he was considered by some to "take advantage of other's work." Ockers is remembered as one of the prominent riders of his generation, together with contemporaries Rik Van Steenbergen and Rik Van Looy.

At the opening of the 1956 Antwerp track season, Ockers experienced a dramatic crash. He did not see Ernest Sterckx return to the track after a mechanical failure, looked back, and directly struck his opponent. Ockers suffered a fractured skull and four broken ribs. He fell into a coma, regained consciousness twice more, but died of his injuries two days later on 1 October. Antwerp was in mourning, and then-11-year-old Eddy Merckx recalls his shock at the death of his idol. Tens of thousands of Antwerp gathered to memorialize and salute Ockers, whose body was buried in Antwerp Sportpaleis.

One year later, a monument was built in Les Forges, Sprimont, in the south of Belgium.

== Career achievements ==
=== Road ===
1941
1st Scheldeprijs
1st Antwerp Province championship
1943
3rd Liège–Bastogne–Liège
3rd Schaal Sels
1944
1st Bruxelles-Everbeek
4th Overall Omloop van België
1946
1st Scheldeprijs
1st Heist-op-den-Berg
1st Bruxelles–Sint-Truiden
1st Antwerp Province championship
5th Gent–Wevelgem
1947
3rd Overall Tour de Suisse
4th La Flèche Wallonne
5th Liège–Bastogne–Liège
6th Overall Tour de Luxembourg
1948
1st Overall Tour of Belgium
2nd Omloop der Vlaamse Ardennen
2nd Dwars door West-Vlaanderen
3rd Gullegem Koerse
1949
7th Overall Tour de France
1950
2nd Overall Tour de France

1st Stage 4

2nd Critérium des As
7th Road race, UCI World Road Championships
8th Overall Challenge Desgrange-Colombo
8th Road race, National Road Championships
1951
5th Overall Tour de France
6th Bordeaux–Paris
1952
2nd Overall Tour de France
2nd Overall Roma–Napoli–Roma

1st Stage 4a

2nd Overall Vuelta a Argentina

1st Stage 3

2nd La Flèche Wallonne
3rd Overall Challenge Desgrange-Colombo
6th Overall Giro d'Italia
10th Road race, UCI World Road Championships
10th Road race, National Road Championships
1953
1st La Flèche Wallonne
2nd Overall Roma–Napoli–Roma

1st Stage 4

2nd Critérium des As
2nd Overall Week-end ardennais
2nd Gran Premio di Lugano
3rd Road race, UCI World Road Championships
3rd Road race, National Road Championships
3rd Overall Challenge Desgrange-Colombo
4th Giro di Lombardia
4th Bordeaux–Paris
6th Overall Giro d'Italia
1954
1st Schaal Sels
2nd Paris–Roubaix
5th Bordeaux–Paris
6th Overall Tour de France

1st Stage 11

6th Milan–San Remo
1955
1st Road race, UCI World Road Championships
1st Overall Challenge Desgrange-Colombo
1st Overall Week-end ardennais
1st La Flèche Wallonne
1st Liège–Bastogne–Liège
1st Trophée Gentil
1st Stage 1b (TTT) Driedaagse van Antwerpen
2nd Overall Tour de Suisse
2nd Grand Prix Martini
2nd De Drie Zustersteden
2nd Bruxelles–Couvin
3rd Critérium des As
5th Paris–Brussels
8th Overall Tour de France

1st Points classification

9th Paris–Tours
1956
1st Overall Roma–Napoli–Roma

1st Stages 1b, 3b, 4b, 5a & 5b

2nd Tour of Flanders
2nd Bordeaux–Paris
2nd Grand Prix Martini
3rd Overall Challenge Desgrange-Colombo
4th Road race, UCI World Road Championships
4th La Flèche Wallonne
5th Classica Sarda
6th Gent–Wevelgem
8th Overall Tour de France

1st Points classification
1st Stage 19

9th Overall Critérium du Dauphiné Libéré

1st Stages 5 & 9

10th Milan–San Remo

=== Track ===
1948
3rd Six Days of Antwerp (with Rik Van Steenbergen)
1951
1st Six Days of Brussels (with Rik Van Steenbergen)
1953
1st Prix de Salon (with Rik Van Steenbergen)
3rd Six Days of Brussels (with Rik Van Steenbergen)
1954
1st Six Days of Ghent (with Rik Van Steenbergen)
2nd Six Days of Brussels (with Rik Van Steenbergen)
2nd Six Days of Berlin (with Rik Van Steenbergen)
3rd Six Days of Antwerp (with Rik Van Steenbergen)
1955
National Championships

1st Madison (with Rik Van Steenbergen)

1st Six Days of Antwerp (with Rik Van Steenbergen)
2nd Six Days of Ghent II (with Ferdinando Terruzzi)
2nd Six Days of Brussels (with Jean Brankart)
3rd Six Days of Ghent I (with Rik Van Steenbergen)
1956
1st Six Days of Antwerp (with Reginald Arnold and Jean Roth)

=== Grand Tour general classification results timeline ===
Grand Tour	1948	1949	1950	1951	1952	1953	1954	1955	1956
Giro d'Italia	—	—	—	—	6	6	—	—	—
Tour de France	11	7	2	5	2	—	6	8	8
Vuelta a España	—	—	—	—	—	—	—	—	—

Legend
—	Did not compete
DNF	Did not finish

== Awards and honours ==
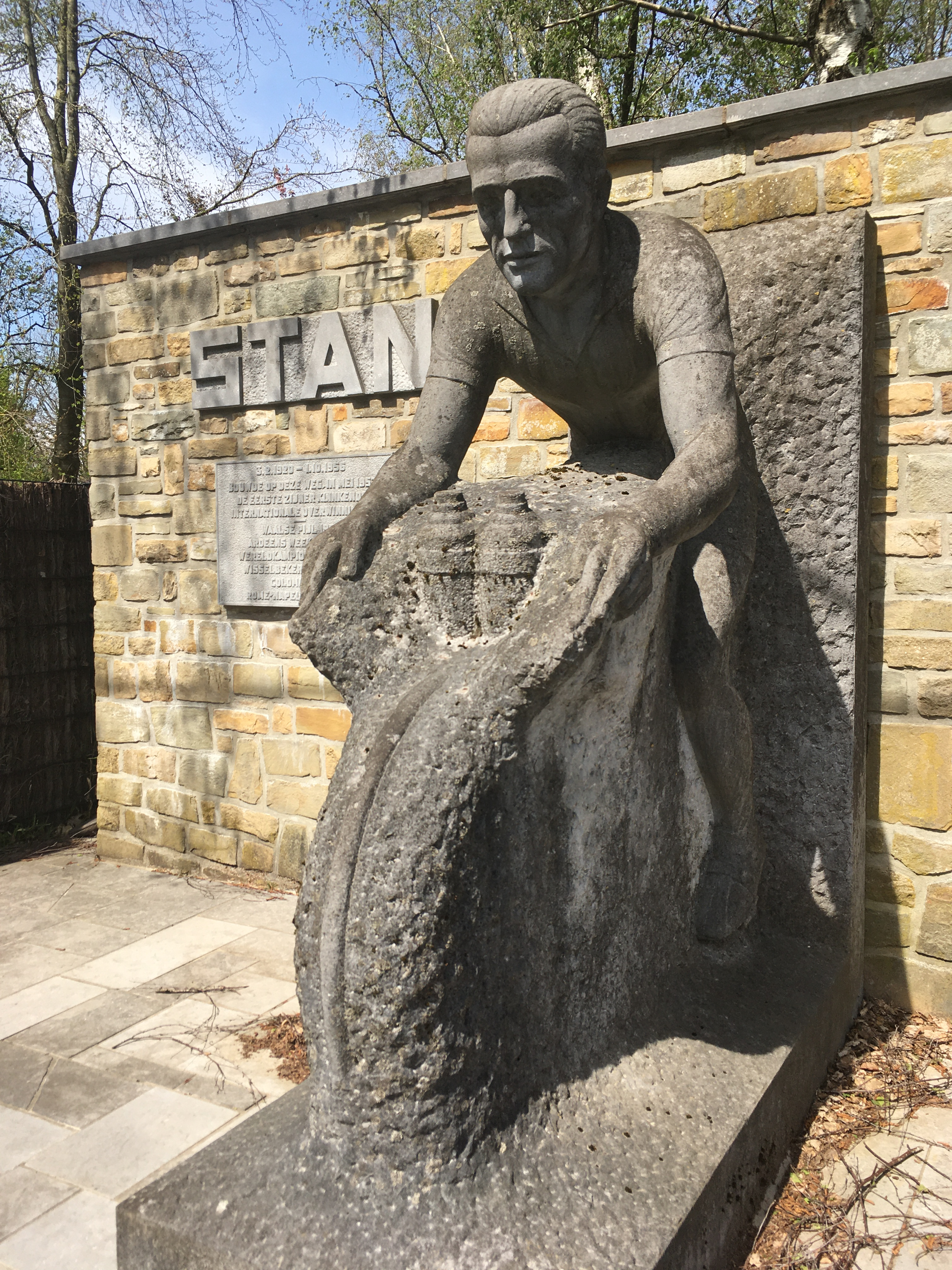
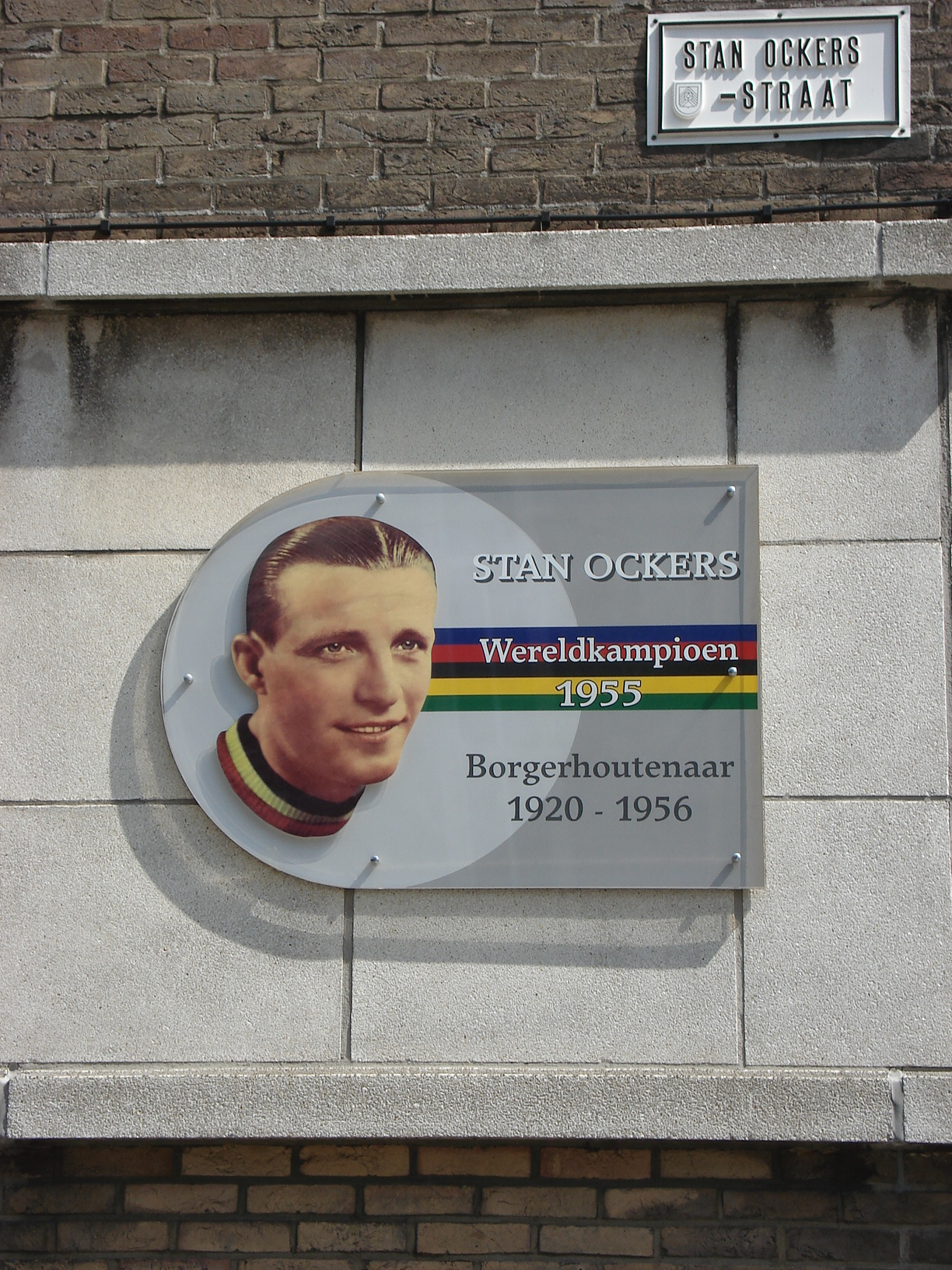
Monument in Liège (1957) and memorial plaque in Borgerhout (2006)
- Trophée Edmond Gentil: 1955
- Grote Prijs Stan Ockers, a derny race in Antwerp: from 1956
- Officer in the Belgian Order of Leopold II: 1957
- Memorial monument in Sprimont, Liège (la Côte des Forges): 1957
- Grand Prix Stan Ockers, a cycle race in France: 1957-1963
- Stan Ockers Classic, a criterium in Antwerp: from 1963
- A street, Stan Ockersstraat in Borgerhout, Antwerp
- Stanneke a song by Hugo Matthysen: 1990
- Mémorial Stan Ockers, a race organized by Cyclo-Club de Beaufays from 1996
- Introduced in the UCI Hall of Fame: 2002
- Mémoire du Cyclisme - Ranking of the Greatest Cyclists (44th place): 2002
- Commemorative plaque in Borgerhout, Antwerp: 2006
- CyclingRanking - Overall all time ranking (43rd place): 2022
