= Germain Derycke =

Belgian cyclist

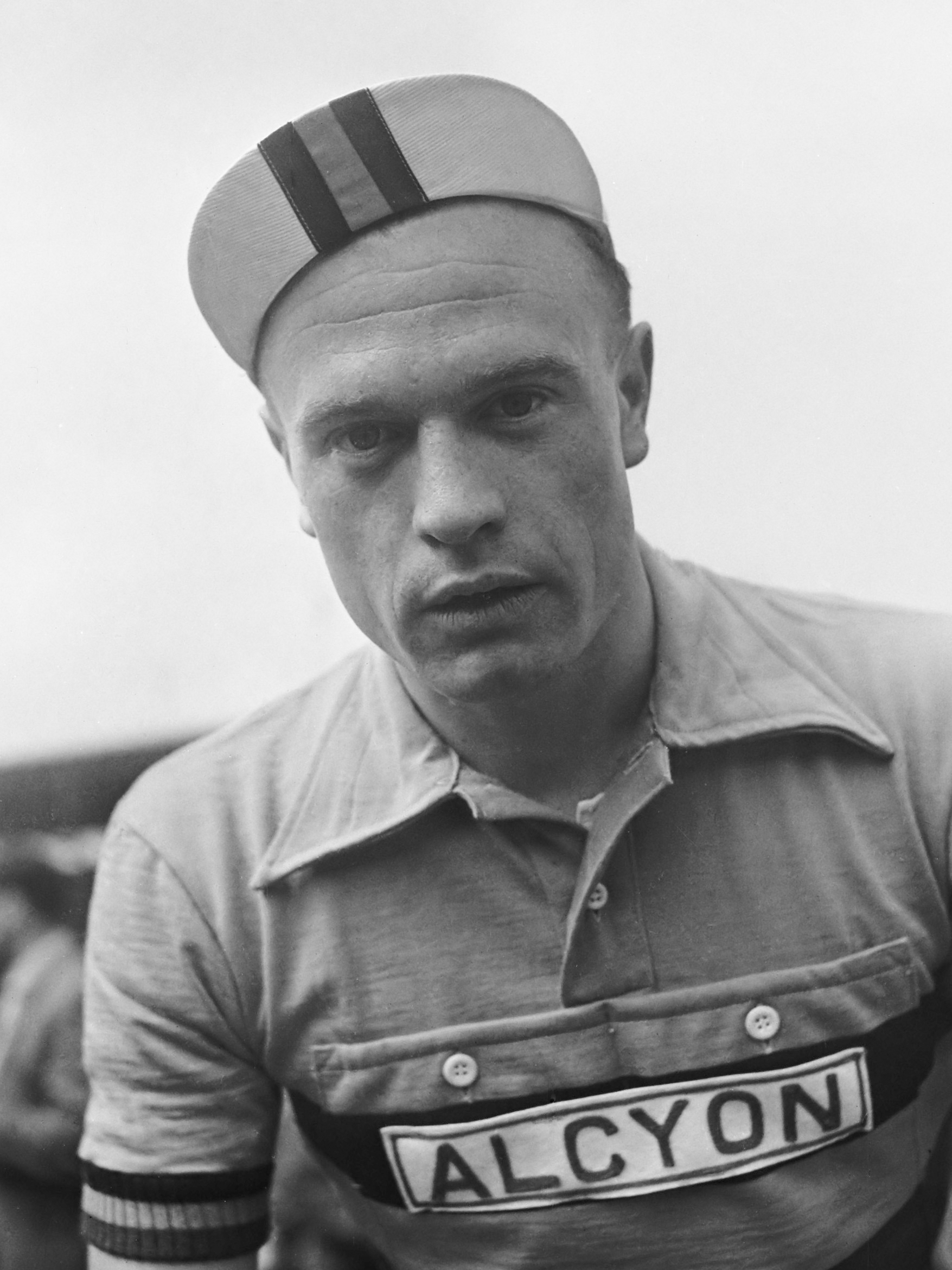
- Derycke in 1954

Personal information
- Full name: Germain Derycke
- Born: 2 November 1929 Belgium
- Died: 13 January 1978 (aged 48)

Cycling career
- Sport: Cycling
- Discipline: Road
- Role: Rider

Professional teams
- 1950–1951: Groene Leeuw
- 1952–1955: Alcyon-Dunlop
- 1956–1957: Faema-Guerra
- 1958–1959: Carpano
- 1960: Liberia-Grammont
- 1961: Baratti-Milano

Major wins
- One-day races and Classics Paris–Roubaix (1953) La Flèche Wallonne (1954) Milan–San Remo (1955) Liège–Bastogne–Liège (1957) Tour of Flanders (1958) Grand Tours Tour de France 1 stage (1951)
Medal record
Representing Belgium
Men's road bicycle racing
World Championships
Silver medal – second place	1953 Lugano	Elite Men's Road Race
Bronze medal – third place	1955 Frascati	Elite Men's Road Race

Germain Derycke (2 November 1929, in Bellegem – 13 January 1978, in Kortrijk) was a Belgian road bicycle racer. Derycke was a classics specialist. In his second year as a professional he came second in Liège–Bastogne–Liège. In 1953 he won Paris–Roubaix. He twice stood on the podium at the world road race championship, second to Fausto Coppi in 1953 and third in 1955 behind Stan Ockers and Jean-Pierre Schmitz.

== Major results ==
1951
1st stage 23 Tour de France
1952
1st Halle–Ingooigem
1953
1st Paris–Roubaix
1st Tour d'Algérie
2nd Road race, UCI Road World Championships
1954
1st La Flèche Wallonne
1st Dwars door Vlaanderen
1955
1st Milan–San Remo
3rd Road race, UCI Road World Championships
1956
1st stages 2 & 3 Paris–Nice
1st Omloop Mandel-Leie-Schelde
1957
1st Liège–Bastogne–Liège
1st Tre Valli Varesine
1958
1st Tour of Flanders
