= André Vlayen =

Belgian cyclist

Personal information
- Full name: André Vlayen
- Born: 17 March 1931 Herselt, Belgium
- Died: 20 February 2017 (aged 85) Herselt, Belgium

Cycling career
- Sport: Cycling
- Role: Rider

André Vlayen (17 March 1931 – 20 February 2017) was a Belgian racing cyclist. He won the Belgian national road race title in 1956 and 1957.
