= Jean Forestier =

French cyclist

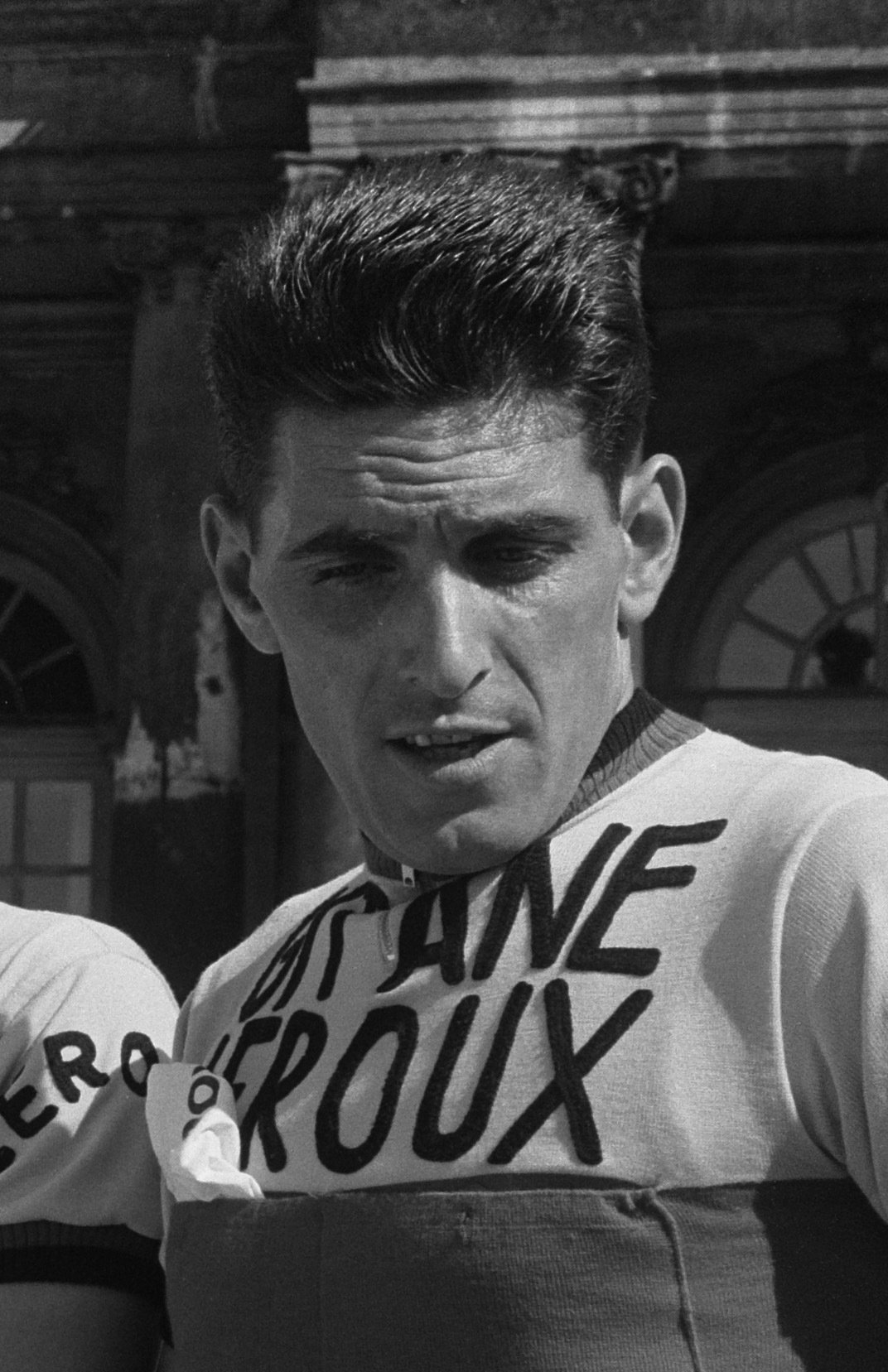
- Forestier at the 1962 Tour de France

Personal information
- Full name: Jean Forestier
- Born: 7 October 1930 (age 96) Lyon, France

Cycling career
- Sport: Cycling
- Current team: Retired
- Discipline: Road
- Rider type: Sprinter

Professional teams
- 1953: Follis
- 1954–1956: Follis-Dunlop
- 1957: Essor-Leroux
- 1958: ACBB-Essor-Leroux-Hutchinson
- 1959: Essor-Leroux
- 1960: Helyett-Fynsec-Leroux
- 1961: Alcyon-Leroux
- 1962: Gitane-Leroux
- 1963–1964: Peugeot-BP
- 1965: Peugeot-BP-Michelin

Major wins
- Grand Tours Tour de France Points classification (1957) 4 individual stages (1954, 1955, 1956, 1961) One-day races and Classics Tour of Flanders (1956) Paris–Roubaix (1955) Jean Forestier's voice recorded on 23 October 2021

Jean Forestier (born 7 October 1930) is a French former cyclist. He was a professional from 1953 to 1965. Forestier won the points classification in the 1957 Tour de France, and wore the yellow jersey for two days. He also won the 1955 Paris–Roubaix.

== Major results ==
1953
1st GP de Thizy
9th Overall Circuit des Six Provinces

1st Stage 1

1954
1st Overall Tour de Romandie
1st Stage 16 Tour de France
1st GP de Thizy
1955
1st Paris–Roubaix
1st GP de Cannes
1st Stage 20 Tour de France
10th Overall Tour du Sud-Est

1st Stage 2

1956
1st Tour of Flanders
1st Stage 16 Tour de France
1957
1st Overall Tour de Romandie

1st Stages 2 & 3b

1st Overall Critérium National
1st Stage 8 Critérium du Dauphiné Libéré
4th Overall Tour de France

1st Points classification

1958
1st Stage 7a Critérium du Dauphiné Libéré
1961
1st Grand Prix du Parisien
1st Stage 8 Tour de France

== Bibliography ==
- Prieur, Benoît (2018). Jean Forestier ou la conquête de Paris-Roubaix 1955 [Jean Forestier or the conquest of Paris-Roubaix 1955] (in French). Lexington, Kentucky: KDP. ISBN 978-1721841493. OCLC 1101112052.
