= 1951 Tour de France, Stage 1 to Stage 12 =

Cycling race stages

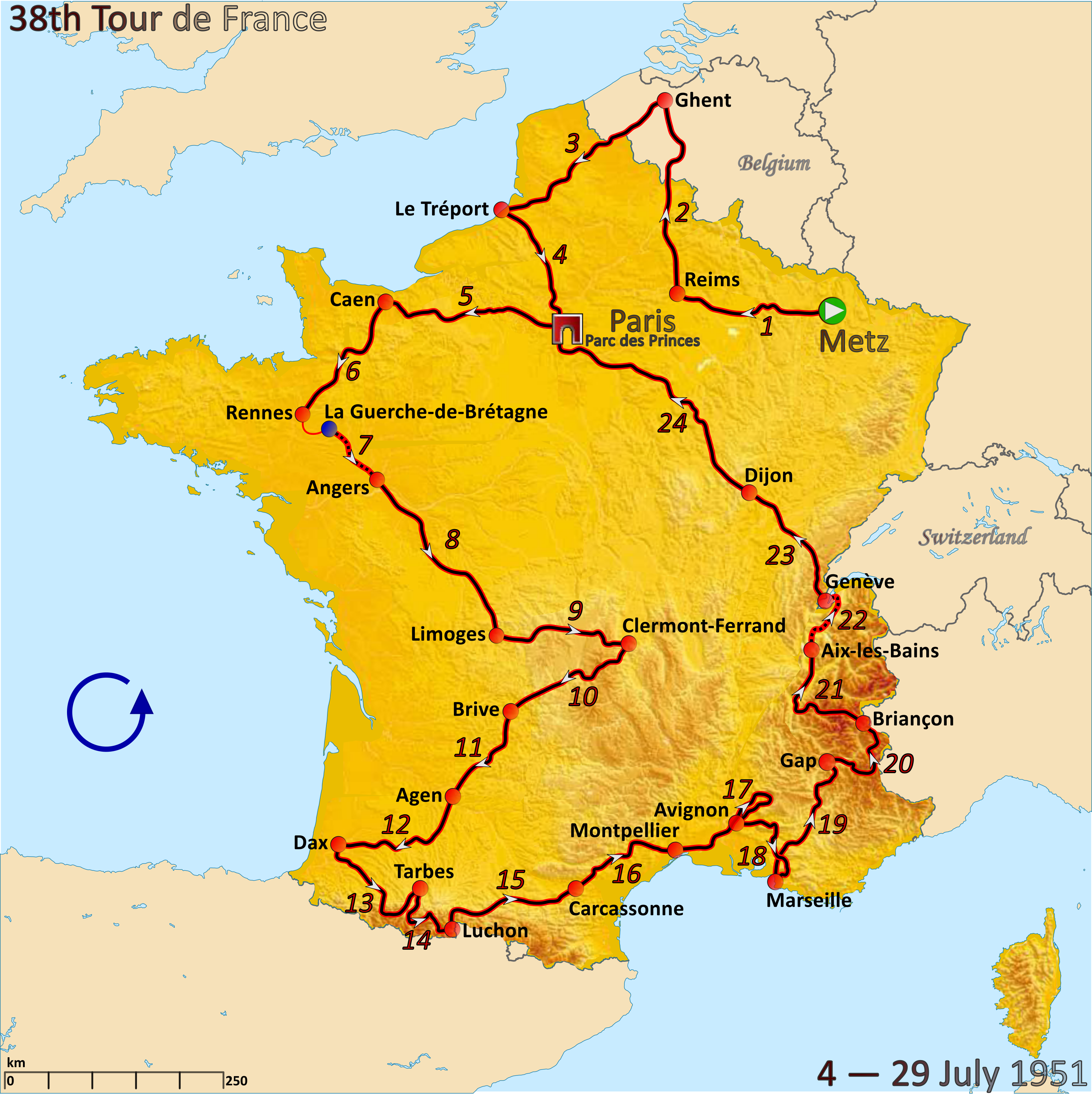
Route of the 1951 Tour de France

The 1951 Tour de France was the 38th edition of Tour de France, one of cycling's Grand Tours. The Tour began in Metz with a flat stage on 4 July and Stage 12 occurred on 16 July with a flat stage to Dax. The race finished in Paris on 29 July.

== Stage 1 ==
4 July 1951 - Metz to Reims, 185 km (115.0 mi)

Stage 1 result

Rank	Rider	Team	Time
1	Giovanni Rossi (SUI)	Switzerland	5h 24' 10"
2	Attilio Redolfi (FRA)	France - Île-de-France/North-West	s.t.
3	Gilbert Bauvin (FRA)	France - East/South-East	s.t.
4	Silvio Pedroni (ITA)	Italy	s.t.
5	Marcel Huber (SUI)	Switzerland	s.t.
6	Apo Lazaridès (FRA)	France	s.t.
7	Jacques Marinelli (FRA)	France - Île-de-France/North-West	+ 43"
8	Robert Desbats (FRA)	France - West/South-West	s.t.
9	Louis Caput (FRA)	France - Paris	+ 52"
10	Gino Sciardis (FRA)	France - Île-de-France/North-West	s.t.

General classification after stage 1

Rank	Rider	Team	Time
1	Giovanni Rossi (SUI)	Switzerland	5h 23' 10"
2	Attilio Redolfi (FRA)	France - Île-de-France/North-West	+ 30"
3	Gilbert Bauvin (FRA)	France - East/South-East	+ 1' 00"
4	Silvio Pedroni (ITA)	Italy	s.t.
5	Marcel Huber (SUI)	Switzerland	s.t.
6	Apo Lazaridès (FRA)	France	s.t.
7	Jacques Marinelli (FRA)	France - Île-de-France/North-West	+ 1' 43"
8	Robert Desbats (FRA)	France - West/South-West	s.t.
9	Louis Caput (FRA)	France - Paris	+ 1' 52"
10	Gino Sciardis (FRA)	France - Île-de-France/North-West	s.t.

== Stage 2 ==
5 July 1951 - Reims to Ghent, 228 km (141.7 mi)

Stage 2 result

Rank	Rider	Team	Time
1	Bim Diederich (LUX)	Luxembourg	6h 29' 54"
2	Stan Ockers (BEL)	Belgium	+ 2' 11"
3	Marcel De Mulder (BEL)	Belgium	+ 3' 02"
4	Raphaël Géminiani (FRA)	France	+ 3' 21"
5	Gino Bartali (ITA)	Italy	+ 3' 50"
6	Hugo Koblet (SUI)	Switzerland	s.t.
7	Jean Baldassari (FRA)	France	s.t.
8	André Rosseel (BEL)	Belgium	s.t.
9	Germain Derycke (BEL)	Belgium	s.t.
10	Fausto Coppi (ITA)	Italy	s.t.

General classification after stage 2

Rank	Rider	Team	Time
1	Bim Diederich (LUX)	Luxembourg	11h 53' 56"
2	Stan Ockers (BEL)	Belgium	+ 2' 41"
3	Attilio Redolfi (FRA)	France - Île-de-France/North-West	+ 3' 28"
4	Marcel De Mulder (BEL)	Belgium	+ 4' 02"
5	Raphaël Géminiani (FRA)	France	+ 4' 21"
6	Robert Desbats (FRA)	France - West/South-West	+ 4' 41"
7	Jacques Marinelli (FRA)	France - Île-de-France/North-West	s.t.
8	Gilbert Bauvin (FRA)	France - East/South-East	+ 4' 42"
9	Silvio Pedroni (ITA)	Italy	s.t.
10	Marcel Huber (SUI)	Switzerland	s.t.

== Stage 3 ==
6 July 1951 - Ghent to Le Tréport, 219 km (136 mi)

Stage 3 result

Rank	Rider	Team	Time
1	Georges Meunier (FRA)	France - West/South-West	7h 05' 14"
2	Giovanni Rossi (SUI)	Switzerland	s.t.
3	Willy Kemp (LUX)	Luxembourg	s.t.
4	Gilbert Bauvin (FRA)	France - East/South-East	s.t.
5	Gerard Peters (NED)	Netherlands	+ 58"
6	Stan Ockers (BEL)	Belgium	s.t.
7	Raymond Guégan (NED)	Netherlands	s.t.
8	Jean Baldassari (FRA)	France	s.t.
9	Georges Aeschlimann (SUI)	Switzerland	s.t.
10	Marcel Huber (SUI)	Switzerland	s.t.

General classification after stage 3

Rank	Rider	Team	Time
1	Bim Diederich (LUX)	Luxembourg	19h 00' 08"
2	Stan Ockers (BEL)	Belgium	+ 2' 41"
3	Georges Meunier (FRA)	France - West/South-West	+ 2' 52"
4	Attilio Redolfi (FRA)	France - Île-de-France/North-West	+ 3' 28"
5	Gilbert Bauvin (FRA)	France - East/South-East	+ 3' 44"
6	Giovanni Rossi (SUI)	Switzerland	+ 3' 47"
7	Raphaël Géminiani (FRA)	France	+ 4' 21"
8	Marcel De Mulder (BEL)	Belgium	+ 4' 27"
9	Willy Kemp (LUX)	Luxembourg	+ 4' 36"
10	Robert Desbats (FRA)	France - West/South-West	+ 4' 41"

== Stage 4 ==
7 July 1951 - Le Tréport to Paris, 188 km (117 mi)

Stage 4 result

Rank	Rider	Team	Time
1	Roger Leveque (FRA)	France - West/South-West	4h 43' 15"
2	Jean Baldassari (FRA)	France	+ 22"
3	Hilaire Couvreur (BEL)	Belgium	s.t.
4	Dominique Forlini (FRA)	France - Paris	s.t.
5	Lucien Teisseire (FRA)	France	s.t.
6	Apo Lazaridès (FRA)	France	+ 49"
7	Raymond Guégan (NED)	Netherlands	+ 2' 21"
8	Isidore De Rijck (BEL)	Belgium	s.t.
9	Jean Goldschmit (LUX)	Luxembourg	s.t.
10	Édouard Muller (FRA)	France	s.t.

General classification after stage 4

Rank	Rider	Team	Time
1	Bim Diederich (LUX)	Luxembourg	23h 45' 44"
2	Roger Leveque (FRA)	France - West/South-West	+ 2' 13"
3	Jean Baldassari (FRA)	France	+ 2' 21"
4	Stan Ockers (BEL)	Belgium	+ 2' 41"
5	Georges Meunier (FRA)	France - West/South-West	+ 2' 52"
6	Attilio Redolfi (FRA)	France - Île-de-France/North-West	+ 3' 28"
7	Lucien Teisseire (FRA)	France	+ 3' 35"
8	Gilbert Bauvin (FRA)	France - East/South-East	+ 3' 44"
9	Giovanni Rossi (SUI)	Switzerland	+ 3' 47"
10	Raphaël Géminiani (FRA)	France	+ 4' 21"

== Stage 5 ==
8 July 1951 - Paris to Caen, 215 km (134 mi)

Stage 5 result

Rank	Rider	Team	Time
1	Serafino Biagioni (ITA)	Italy	6h 10' 34"
2	Serge Blusson (FRA)	France - Paris	+ 9' 59"
3	Fiorenzo Magni (ITA)	Italy	s.t.
4	Hugo Koblet (SUI)	Switzerland	s.t.
5	Stan Ockers (BEL)	Belgium	s.t.
6	Gino Sciardis (FRA)	France - Île-de-France/North-West	s.t.
7	Henk Faanhof (NED)	Netherlands	s.t.
8	Gerrit Voorting (NED)	Netherlands	s.t.
9	Wim van Est (NED)	Netherlands	s.t.
10	Jean Robic (FRA)	France - Paris	s.t.

General classification after stage 5

Rank	Rider	Team	Time
1	Serafino Biagioni (ITA)	Italy	30h 05' 11"
2	Bim Diederich (LUX)	Luxembourg	+ 1' 06"
3	Roger Leveque (FRA)	France - West/South-West	+ 3' 19"
4	Jean Baldassari (FRA)	France	+ 3' 27"
5	Stan Ockers (BEL)	Belgium	+ 3' 47"
6	Georges Meunier (FRA)	France - West/South-West	+ 3' 58"
7	Attilio Redolfi (FRA)	France - Île-de-France/North-West	+ 4' 34"
8	Lucien Teisseire (FRA)	France	+ 4' 41"
9	Gilbert Bauvin (FRA)	France - East/South-East	+ 4' 50"
10	Giovanni Rossi (SUI)	Switzerland	+ 4' 53"

== Stage 6 ==
9 July 1951 - Caen to Rennes, 182 km (113 mi)

Stage 6 result

Rank	Rider	Team	Time
1	Édouard Muller (FRA)	France	5h 22' 10"
2	Gilbert Bauvin (FRA)	France - East/South-East	s.t.
3	Wim van Est (NED)	Netherlands	s.t.
4	Andrea Carrea (ITA)	Italy	s.t.
5	Roger Leveque (FRA)	France - West/South-West	s.t.
6	Marcel De Mulder (BEL)	Belgium	+ 3' 11"
7	Jean-Marie Cieliczka (FRA)	France - West/South-West	s.t.
8	Robert Castellin (FRA)	France - East/South-East	s.t.
9	Hans Sommer (SUI)	Switzerland	+ 5' 45"
10	Gino Sciardis (FRA)	France - Île-de-France/North-West	s.t.

General classification after stage 6

Rank	Rider	Team	Time
1	Roger Leveque (FRA)	France - West/South-West	35h 30' 40"
2	Gilbert Bauvin (FRA)	France - East/South-East	+ 1' 01"
3	Édouard Muller (FRA)	France	+ 4' 37"
4	Marcel De Mulder (BEL)	Belgium	+ 5' 25"
5	Andrea Carrea (ITA)	Italy	+ 8' 21"
6	Lucien Lazaridès (FRA)	France	+ 8' 22"
7	Serafino Biagioni (ITA)	Italy	+ 9' 39"
8	Robert Castellin (FRA)	France - East/South-East	+ 10' 20"
9	Bim Diederich (LUX)	Luxembourg	+ 10' 45"
10	Wim van Est (NED)	Netherlands	+ 11' 09"

== Stage 7 ==
10 July 1951 - La Guerche-de-Bretagne to Angers, 85 km (53 mi) (ITT)

Stage 7 result

Rank	Rider	Team	Time
1	Hugo Koblet (SUI)	Switzerland	2h 05' 40"
2	Louison Bobet (FRA)	France	+ 59"
3	Fausto Coppi (ITA)	Italy	+ 1' 04"
4	Fiorenzo Magni (ITA)	Italy	+ 2' 52"
5	Pierre Barbotin (FRA)	France	+ 3' 53"
6	Jean Goldschmit (LUX)	Luxembourg	+ 5' 03"
7	Gino Bartali (ITA)	Italy	+ 5' 14"
8	Serafino Biagioni (ITA)	Italy	+ 5' 41"
9	Raphaël Géminiani (FRA)	France	+ 5' 58"
10	Lucien Lazaridès (FRA)	France	+ 6' 15"

General classification after stage 7

Rank	Rider	Team	Time
1	Roger Leveque (FRA)	France - West/South-West	37h 43' 53"
2	Gilbert Bauvin (FRA)	France - East/South-East	+ 1' 19"
3	Hugo Koblet (SUI)	Switzerland	+ 7' 02"
4	Lucien Lazaridès (FRA)	France	+ 7' 04"
5	Serafino Biagioni (ITA)	Italy	+ 7' 47"
6	Marcel De Mulder (BEL)	Belgium	+ 8' 04"
7	Louison Bobet (FRA)	France	+ 8' 31"
8	Fausto Coppi (ITA)	Italy	+ 9' 06"
9	Édouard Muller (FRA)	France	+ 9' 20"
10	Andrea Carrea (ITA)	Italy	+ 9' 38"

== Stage 8 ==
11 July 1951 - Angers to Limoges, 241 km (150 mi)

Stage 8 result

Rank	Rider	Team	Time
1	André Rosseel (BEL)	Belgium	7h 08' 20"
2	Nello Lauredi (FRA)	France	s.t.
3	Raphaël Géminiani (FRA)	France	+ 57"
4	Gerrit Voorting (NED)	Netherlands	s.t.
5	Bim Diederich (LUX)	Luxembourg	s.t.
6	Pierre Cogan (FRA)	France - West/South-West	s.t.
7	Maurice Diot (FRA)	France - Paris	s.t.
8	Robert Desbats (FRA)	France - West/South-West	s.t.
9	Alois De Hertog (BEL)	Belgium	s.t.
10	Alois Vansteenkiste (BEL)	Belgium	s.t.

General classification after stage 8

Rank	Rider	Team	Time
1	Roger Leveque (FRA)	France - West/South-West	44h 57' 21"
2	Gilbert Bauvin (FRA)	France - East/South-East	+ 1' 19"
3	Bim Diederich (LUX)	Luxembourg	+ 6' 45"
4	Hugo Koblet (SUI)	Switzerland	+ 7' 02"
5	Lucien Lazaridès (FRA)	France	+ 7' 04"
6	Serafino Biagioni (ITA)	Italy	+ 7' 47"
7	Marcel De Mulder (BEL)	Belgium	+ 8' 04"
8	Louison Bobet (FRA)	France	+ 8' 31"
9	Alois Vansteenkiste (BEL)	Belgium	+ 9' 00"
10	Fausto Coppi (ITA)	Italy	+ 9' 06"

== Rest Day 1 ==
12 July 1951 - Limoges

== Stage 9 ==
13 July 1951 - Limoges to Clermont-Ferrand, 236 km (147 mi)

Stage 9 result

Rank	Rider	Team	Time
1	Raphaël Géminiani (FRA)	France	6h 59' 40"
2	Jean Goldschmit (LUX)	Luxembourg	+ 52"
3	Stan Ockers (BEL)	Belgium	+ 1' 14"
4	Hugo Koblet (SUI)	Switzerland	s.t.
5	Raoul Rémy (FRA)	France	s.t.
6	Jean Robic (FRA)	France - Paris	s.t.
7	Gerrit Voorting (NED)	Netherlands	s.t.
8	Serafino Biagioni (ITA)	Italy	s.t.
9	Gilbert Bauvin (FRA)	France - East/South-East	s.t.
10	Bernardo Ruiz (ESP)	Spain	s.t.

General classification after stage 9

Rank	Rider	Team	Time
1	Roger Leveque (FRA)	France - West/South-West	51h 58' 15"
2	Gilbert Bauvin (FRA)	France - East/South-East	+ 1' 19"
3	Raphaël Géminiani (FRA)	France	+ 6' 44"
4	Bim Diederich (LUX)	Luxembourg	+ 6' 45"
5	Hugo Koblet (SUI)	Switzerland	+ 7' 02"
6	Lucien Lazaridès (FRA)	France	+ 7' 04"
7	Serafino Biagioni (ITA)	Italy	+ 7' 47"
8	Louison Bobet (FRA)	France	+ 8' 31"
9	Fausto Coppi (ITA)	Italy	+ 9' 06"
10	Fiorenzo Magni (ITA)	Italy	+ 10' 54"

== Stage 10 ==
14 July 1951 - Clermont-Ferrand to Brive, 216 km (134 mi)

Stage 10 result

Rank	Rider	Team	Time
1	Bernardo Ruiz (ESP)	Spain	6h 35' 15"
2	Marcel Verschueren (BEL)	Belgium	+ 1' 38"
3	Bernard Gauthier (FRA)	France	+ 2' 25"
4	Armand Baeyens (BEL)	Belgium	s.t.
5	Serafino Biagioni (ITA)	Italy	+ 6' 44"
6	Gilbert Bauvin (FRA)	France - East/South-East	s.t.
7	Gerard Peters (NED)	Netherlands	+ 7' 27"
8	Stan Ockers (BEL)	Belgium	s.t.
9	Roger Decock (BEL)	Belgium	s.t.
10	Wim van Est (NED)	Netherlands	s.t.

General classification after stage 10

Rank	Rider	Team	Time
1	Roger Leveque (FRA)	France - West/South-West	58h 40' 57"
2	Gilbert Bauvin (FRA)	France - East/South-East	+ 36"
3	Bernardo Ruiz (ESP)	Spain	+ 6' 14"
4	Raphaël Géminiani (FRA)	France	+ 6' 44"
5	Bim Diederich (LUX)	Luxembourg	+ 6' 45"
6	Hugo Koblet (SUI)	Switzerland	+ 7' 02"
7	Lucien Lazaridès (FRA)	France	+ 7' 04"
8	Serafino Biagioni (ITA)	Italy	s.t.
9	Louison Bobet (FRA)	France	+ 8' 31"
10	Fausto Coppi (ITA)	Italy	+ 9' 06"

== Stage 11 ==
15 July 1951 - Brive to Agen, 177 km (110 mi)

Stage 11 result

Rank	Rider	Team	Time
1	Hugo Koblet (SUI)	Switzerland	4h 32' 41"
2	Marcel Michel (FRA)	France - Paris	+ 2' 35"
3	Gerard Peters (NED)	Netherlands	s.t.
4	Germain Derycke (BEL)	Belgium	s.t.
5	Jean Robic (FRA)	France - Paris	s.t.
6	Louis Caput (FRA)	France - Paris	s.t.
7	Dominique Forlini (FRA)	France - Paris	s.t.
8	Marcel Huber (SUI)	Switzerland	s.t.
9	Hans Sommer (SUI)	Switzerland	s.t.
10	Leo Weilenmann (SUI)	Switzerland	s.t.

General classification after stage 11

Rank	Rider	Team	Time
1	Roger Leveque (FRA)	France - West/South-West	63h 16' 13"
2	Gilbert Bauvin (FRA)	France - East/South-East	+ 36"
3	Hugo Koblet (SUI)	Switzerland	+ 3' 27"
4	Bernardo Ruiz (ESP)	Spain	+ 6' 14"
5	Raphaël Géminiani (FRA)	France	+ 6' 44"
6	Bim Diederich (LUX)	Luxembourg	+ 6' 45"
7	Lucien Lazaridès (FRA)	France	+ 7' 04"
8	Serafino Biagioni (ITA)	Italy	s.t.
9	Louison Bobet (FRA)	France	+ 8' 31"
10	Fausto Coppi (ITA)	Italy	+ 9' 06"

== Stage 12 ==
16 July 1951 - Agen to Dax, 185 km (115 mi)

Stage 12 result

Rank	Rider	Team	Time
1	Wim van Est (NED)	Netherlands	5h 00' 25"
2	Louis Caput (FRA)	France - Paris	s.t.
3	Jacques Marinelli (FRA)	France - Île-de-France/North-West	s.t.
4	Gerrit Voorting (NED)	Netherlands	s.t.
5	Édouard Muller (FRA)	France	s.t.
6	Hans Sommer (SUI)	Switzerland	s.t.
7	André Labeylie (FRA)	France - Île-de-France/North-West	s.t.
8	Georges Meunier (FRA)	France - West/South-West	s.t.
9	Marcel De Mulder (BEL)	Belgium	s.t.
10	Joseph Morvan (FRA)	France - West/South-West	s.t.

General classification after stage 12

Rank	Rider	Team	Time
1	Wim van Est (NED)	Netherlands	68h 30' 24"
2	Georges Meunier (FRA)	France - West/South-West	+ 2' 29"
3	Marcel De Mulder (BEL)	Belgium	+ 3' 13"
4	Roger Leveque (FRA)	France - West/South-West	+ 4' 30"
5	Gilbert Bauvin (FRA)	France - East/South-East	+ 5' 06"
6	Hugo Koblet (SUI)	Switzerland	+ 7' 57"
7	Bernardo Ruiz (ESP)	Spain	+ 10' 44"
8	Raphaël Géminiani (FRA)	France	+ 11' 14"
9	Bim Diederich (LUX)	Luxembourg	+ 11' 15"
10	Lucien Lazaridès (FRA)	France	+ 11' 34"
