= 1951 Tour de France, Stage 13 to Stage 24 =

Cycling race stages

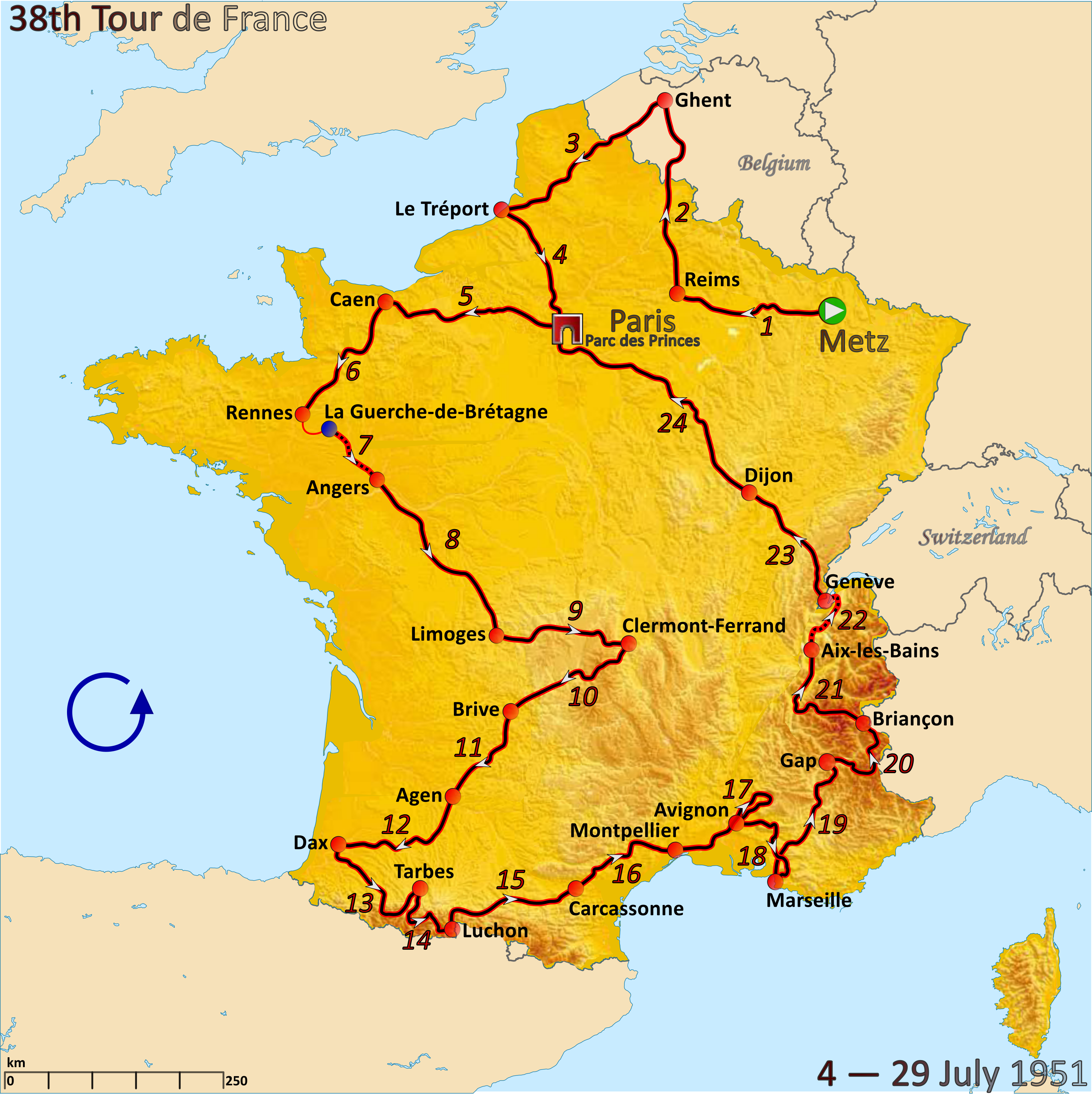
Route of the 1951 Tour de France

The 1951 Tour de France was the 38th edition of Tour de France, one of cycling's Grand Tours. The Tour began in Metz with a flat stage on 4 July and Stage 13 occurred on 17 July with a mountainous stage from Dax. The race finished in Paris on 29 July.

== Stage 13 ==
17 July 1951 - Dax to Tarbes, 201 km (124.9 mi)

Stage 13 result

Rank	Rider	Team	Time
1	Serafino Biagioni (ITA)	Italy	5h 47' 57"
2	Gilbert Bauvin (FRA)	France - East/South-East	s.t.
3	Nello Lauredi (FRA)	France	s.t.
4	Raphaël Géminiani (FRA)	France	s.t.
5	Maurice Diot (FRA)	France - Paris	+ 7' 55"
6	Pierre Brambilla (FRA)	France - East/South-East	s.t.
7	Edward Van Ende (BEL)	Belgium	s.t.
8	Gino Bartali (ITA)	Italy	+ 9' 15"
9	Adolphe Deledda (FRA)	France - East/South-East	s.t.
10	Stan Ockers (BEL)	Belgium	s.t.

General classification after stage 13

Rank	Rider	Team	Time
1	Gilbert Bauvin (FRA)	France - East/South-East	74h 22' 37"
2	Raphaël Géminiani (FRA)	France	+ 6' 18"
3	Serafino Biagioni (ITA)	Italy	s.t.
4	Georges Meunier (FRA)	France - West/South-West	+ 10' 05"
5	Hugo Koblet (SUI)	Switzerland	+ 12' 56"
6	Nello Lauredi (FRA)	France	+ 13' 19"
7	Marcel De Mulder (BEL)	Belgium	+ 13' 21"
8	Bernardo Ruiz (ESP)	Spain	+ 15' 43"
9	Lucien Lazaridès (FRA)	France	+ 16' 33"
10	Fausto Coppi (ITA)	Italy	+ 18' 35"

== Stage 14 ==
18 July 1951 - Tarbes to Luchon, 142 km (88 mi)

Stage 14 result

Rank	Rider	Team	Time
1	Hugo Koblet (SUI)	Switzerland	4h 41' 41"
2	Fausto Coppi (ITA)	Italy	s.t.
3	Gino Bartali (ITA)	Italy	+ 2' 04"
4	Lucien Lazaridès (FRA)	France	+ 2' 52"
5	Raphaël Géminiani (FRA)	France	+ 6' 10"
6	Stan Ockers (BEL)	Belgium	+ 7' 26"
7	Pierre Barbotin (FRA)	France	+ 8' 59"
8	Louison Bobet (FRA)	France	s.t.
9	Edward Van Ende (BEL)	Belgium	s.t.
10	Alois De Hertog (BEL)	Belgium	s.t.

General classification after stage 14

Rank	Rider	Team	Time
1	Hugo Koblet (SUI)	Switzerland	79h 16' 14"
2	Gilbert Bauvin (FRA)	France - East/South-East	+ 21"
3	Raphaël Géminiani (FRA)	France	+ 32"
4	Fausto Coppi (ITA)	Italy	+ 5' 09"
5	Lucien Lazaridès (FRA)	France	+ 7' 29"
6	Georges Meunier (FRA)	France - West/South-West	+ 12' 15"
7	Bernardo Ruiz (ESP)	Spain	+ 12' 53"
8	Gino Bartali (ITA)	Italy	s.t.
9	Nello Lauredi (FRA)	France	+ 13' 40"
10	Serafino Biagioni (ITA)	Italy	+ 16' 17"

== Stage 15 ==
19 July 1951 - Luchon to Carcassonne, 213 km (132 mi)

Stage 15 result

Rank	Rider	Team	Time
1	André Rosseel (BEL)	Belgium	6h 22' 01"
2	Roger Decock (BEL)	Belgium	+ 12"
3	Maurice Diot (FRA)	France - Paris	s.t.
4	Louis Caput (FRA)	France - Paris	s.t.
5	Isidore De Rijck (BEL)	Belgium	s.t.
6	Raoul Rémy (FRA)	France	s.t.
7	Lucien Teisseire (FRA)	France	s.t.
8	Alois De Hertog (BEL)	Belgium	s.t.
9	José Serra (ESP)	Spain	s.t.
10	Pierre Brambilla (FRA)	France - East/South-East	s.t.

General classification after stage 15

Rank	Rider	Team	Time
1	Hugo Koblet (SUI)	Switzerland	85h 43' 23"
2	Gilbert Bauvin (FRA)	France - East/South-East	+ 21"
3	Raphaël Géminiani (FRA)	France	+ 32"
4	Fausto Coppi (ITA)	Italy	+ 5' 09"
5	Lucien Lazaridès (FRA)	France	+ 7' 29"
6	Serafino Biagioni (ITA)	Italy	+ 11' 21"
7	Georges Meunier (FRA)	France - West/South-West	+ 12' 15"
8	Bernardo Ruiz (ESP)	Spain	+ 12' 53"
9	Gino Bartali (ITA)	Italy	s.t.
10	Nello Lauredi (FRA)	France	+ 13' 40"

== Stage 16 ==
20 July 1951 - Carcassonne to Montpellier, 192 km (119 mi)

Stage 16 result

Rank	Rider	Team	Time
1	Hugo Koblet (SUI)	Switzerland	5h 27' 14"
2	Jacques Marinelli (FRA)	France - Île-de-France/North-West	s.t.
3	Raphaël Géminiani (FRA)	France	s.t.
4	Lucien Lazaridès (FRA)	France	s.t.
5	Pierre Barbotin (FRA)	France	s.t.
6	Gino Bartali (ITA)	Italy	+ 4' 14"
7	André Labeylie (FRA)	France - Île-de-France/North-West	s.t.
8	Louison Bobet (FRA)	France	s.t.
9	Stan Ockers (BEL)	Belgium	+ 5' 34"
10	Marcel Verschueren (BEL)	Belgium	s.t.

General classification after stage 16

Rank	Rider	Team	Time
1	Hugo Koblet (SUI)	Switzerland	91h 09' 37"
2	Raphaël Géminiani (FRA)	France	+ 1' 32"
3	Lucien Lazaridès (FRA)	France	+ 8' 29"
4	Gilbert Bauvin (FRA)	France - East/South-East	+ 13' 21"
5	Gino Bartali (ITA)	Italy	+ 18' 07"
6	Nello Lauredi (FRA)	France	+ 20' 14"
7	Pierre Barbotin (FRA)	France	+ 22' 48"
8	Louison Bobet (FRA)	France	+ 22' 54"
9	Marcel De Mulder (BEL)	Belgium	+ 23' 48"
10	Stan Ockers (BEL)	Belgium	+ 25' 19"

== Rest Day 2 ==
21 July 1951 - Montpellier

== Stage 17 ==
22 July 1951 - Montpellier to Avignon, 224 km (139 mi)

Stage 17 result

Rank	Rider	Team	Time
1	Louison Bobet (FRA)	France	7h 24' 44"
2	Pierre Barbotin (FRA)	France	+ 50"
3	Gino Bartali (ITA)	Italy	+ 56"
4	Raphaël Géminiani (FRA)	France	s.t.
5	Hugo Koblet (SUI)	Switzerland	s.t.
6	Lucien Lazaridès (FRA)	France	s.t.
7	Stan Ockers (BEL)	Belgium	+ 1' 15"
8	Alois De Hertog (BEL)	Belgium	+ 1' 26"
9	Edward Van Ende (BEL)	Belgium	s.t.
10	Adolphe Deledda (FRA)	France - East/South-East	+ 4' 50"

General classification after stage 17

Rank	Rider	Team	Time
1	Hugo Koblet (SUI)	Switzerland	98h 35' 17"
2	Raphaël Géminiani (FRA)	France	+ 1' 32"
3	Lucien Lazaridès (FRA)	France	+ 7' 49"
4	Gino Bartali (ITA)	Italy	+ 17' 47"
5	Louison Bobet (FRA)	France	+ 20' 58"
6	Pierre Barbotin (FRA)	France	+ 22' 12"
7	Nello Lauredi (FRA)	France	+ 24' 08"
8	Stan Ockers (BEL)	Belgium	+ 25' 38"
9	Gilbert Bauvin (FRA)	France - East/South-East	+ 28' 20"
10	Bernardo Ruiz (ESP)	Spain	+ 31' 49"

== Stage 18 ==
23 July 1951 - Avignon to Marseille, 173 km (107 mi)

Stage 18 result

Rank	Rider	Team	Time
1	Fiorenzo Magni (ITA)	Italy	4h 56' 46"
2	Stan Ockers (BEL)	Belgium	s.t.
3	Gino Sciardis (FRA)	France - Île-de-France/North-West	s.t.
4	Roger Buchonnet (FRA)	France - East/South-East	s.t.
5	Georges Meunier (FRA)	France - West/South-West	s.t.
6	Gilbert Bauvin (FRA)	France - East/South-East	s.t.
7	Hilaire Couvreur (BEL)	Belgium	s.t.
8	Pierre Barbotin (FRA)	France	s.t.
9	Joseph Morvan (FRA)	France - West/South-West	s.t.
10	Serafino Biagioni (ITA)	Italy	s.t.

General classification after stage 18

Rank	Rider	Team	Time
1	Hugo Koblet (SUI)	Switzerland	103h 36' 37"
2	Raphaël Géminiani (FRA)	France	+ 1' 32"
3	Lucien Lazaridès (FRA)	France	+ 7' 49"
4	Pierre Barbotin (FRA)	France	+ 17' 38"
5	Gino Bartali (ITA)	Italy	+ 17' 47"
6	Stan Ockers (BEL)	Belgium	+ 20' 34"
7	Louison Bobet (FRA)	France	+ 20' 58"
8	Gilbert Bauvin (FRA)	France - East/South-East	+ 23' 46"
9	Nello Lauredi (FRA)	France	+ 24' 08"
10	Fiorenzo Magni (ITA)	Italy	+ 26' 34"

== Stage 19 ==
24 July 1951 - Marseille to Gap, 208 km (129 mi)

Stage 19 result

Rank	Rider	Team	Time
1	Armand Baeyens (BEL)	Belgium	7h 15' 41"
2	Gino Bartali (ITA)	Italy	+ 1' 33"
3	Fiorenzo Magni (ITA)	Italy	s.t.
4	Jean Robic (FRA)	France - Paris	s.t.
5	Stan Ockers (BEL)	Belgium	s.t.
6	Raphaël Géminiani (FRA)	France	s.t.
7	Hugo Koblet (SUI)	Switzerland	s.t.
8	Jacques Marinelli (FRA)	France - Île-de-France/North-West	s.t.
9	Pierre Cogan (FRA)	France - West/South-West	s.t.
10	Nello Lauredi (FRA)	France	s.t.

General classification after stage 19

Rank	Rider	Team	Time
1	Hugo Koblet (SUI)	Switzerland	110h 53' 51"
2	Raphaël Géminiani (FRA)	France	+ 1' 32"
3	Lucien Lazaridès (FRA)	France	+ 7' 49"
4	Gino Bartali (ITA)	Italy	+ 16' 57"
5	Pierre Barbotin (FRA)	France	+ 17' 58"
6	Stan Ockers (BEL)	Belgium	+ 20' 34"
7	Louison Bobet (FRA)	France	+ 21' 18"
8	Gilbert Bauvin (FRA)	France - East/South-East	+ 23' 46"
9	Nello Lauredi (FRA)	France	+ 24' 08"
10	Fiorenzo Magni (ITA)	Italy	+ 26' 34"

== Stage 20 ==
25 July 1951 - Gap to Briançon, 165 km (103 mi)

Stage 20 result

Rank	Rider	Team	Time
1	Fausto Coppi (ITA)	Italy	5h 34' 04"
2	Roger Buchonnet (FRA)	France - East/South-East	+ 3' 43"
3	Hugo Koblet (SUI)	Switzerland	+ 4' 09"
4	Gino Bartali (ITA)	Italy	+ 7' 36"
5	Stan Ockers (BEL)	Belgium	+ 9' 03"
6	Lucien Lazaridès (FRA)	France	s.t.
7	Jean Robic (FRA)	France - Paris	+ 11' 39"
8	Gilbert Bauvin (FRA)	France - East/South-East	s.t.
9	Raphaël Géminiani (FRA)	France	s.t.
10	Fiorenzo Magni (ITA)	Italy	+ 11' 46"

General classification after stage 20

Rank	Rider	Team	Time
1	Hugo Koblet (SUI)	Switzerland	116h 32' 04"
2	Raphaël Géminiani (FRA)	France	+ 9' 02"
3	Lucien Lazaridès (FRA)	France	+ 12' 43"
4	Gino Bartali (ITA)	Italy	+ 20' 24"
5	Stan Ockers (BEL)	Belgium	+ 25' 28"
6	Pierre Barbotin (FRA)	France	+ 30' 41"
7	Gilbert Bauvin (FRA)	France - East/South-East	+ 31' 16"
8	Fiorenzo Magni (ITA)	Italy	+ 34' 41"
9	Louison Bobet (FRA)	France	+ 37' 23"
10	Fausto Coppi (ITA)	Italy	+ 38' 23"

== Stage 21 ==
26 July 1951 - Briançon to Aix-les-Bains, 201 km (125 mi)

Stage 21 result

Rank	Rider	Team	Time
1	Bernardo Ruiz (ESP)	Spain	6h 45' 24"
2	Jean Robic (FRA)	France - Paris	+ 1' 46"
3	Pierre Cogan (FRA)	France - West/South-West	s.t.
4	Jean Dotto (FRA)	France - East/South-East	s.t.
5	Bernard Gauthier (FRA)	France	s.t.
6	Jean-Marie Goasmat (FRA)	France - West/South-West	+ 6' 33"
7	Stan Ockers (BEL)	Belgium	+ 6' 38"
8	Gino Bartali (ITA)	Italy	s.t.
9	Adolphe Deledda (FRA)	France - East/South-East	s.t.
10	Fausto Coppi (ITA)	Italy	s.t.

General classification after stage 21

Rank	Rider	Team	Time
1	Hugo Koblet (SUI)	Switzerland	123h 24' 06"
2	Raphaël Géminiani (FRA)	France	+ 9' 02"
3	Lucien Lazaridès (FRA)	France	+ 12' 43"
4	Gino Bartali (ITA)	Italy	+ 20' 04"
5	Stan Ockers (BEL)	Belgium	+ 25' 28"
6	Pierre Barbotin (FRA)	France	+ 30' 41"
7	Bernardo Ruiz (ESP)	Spain	+ 31' 48"
8	Gilbert Bauvin (FRA)	France - East/South-East	+ 32' 43"
9	Fiorenzo Magni (ITA)	Italy	+ 34' 41"
10	Fausto Coppi (ITA)	Italy	+ 38' 23"

== Stage 22 ==
27 July 1951 - Aix-les-Bains to Geneva, 97 km (60 mi) (ITT)

Stage 22 result

Rank	Rider	Team	Time
1	Hugo Koblet (SUI)	Switzerland	2h 39' 45"
2	Roger Decock (BEL)	Belgium	+ 4' 50"
3	Pierre Barbotin (FRA)	France	+ 4' 59"
4	Fiorenzo Magni (ITA)	Italy	+ 5' 43"
5	Stan Ockers (BEL)	Belgium	+ 6' 25"
6	Fausto Coppi (ITA)	Italy	+ 7' 28"
7	Gino Bartali (ITA)	Italy	+ 8' 05"
8	Nello Lauredi (FRA)	France	+ 8' 07"
9	Lucien Lazaridès (FRA)	France	+ 10' 33"
10	Joseph Morvan (FRA)	France - West/South-West	+ 11' 26"

General classification after stage 22

Rank	Rider	Team	Time
1	Hugo Koblet (SUI)	Switzerland	126h 02' 51"
2	Raphaël Géminiani (FRA)	France	+ 22' 00"
3	Lucien Lazaridès (FRA)	France	+ 24' 16"
4	Gino Bartali (ITA)	Italy	+ 29' 09"
5	Stan Ockers (BEL)	Belgium	+ 32' 53"
6	Pierre Barbotin (FRA)	France	+ 36' 40"
7	Fiorenzo Magni (ITA)	Italy	+ 41' 24"
8	Gilbert Bauvin (FRA)	France - East/South-East	+ 45' 53"
9	Bernardo Ruiz (ESP)	Spain	+ 45' 55"
10	Fausto Coppi (ITA)	Italy	+ 46' 51"

== Stage 23 ==
28 July 1951 - Geneva to Dijon, 197 km (122 mi)

Stage 23 result

Rank	Rider	Team	Time
1	Germain Derycke (BEL)	Belgium	6h 11' 32"
2	Lucien Teisseire (FRA)	France	s.t.
3	Adolphe Deledda (FRA)	France - East/South-East	s.t.
4	André Rosseel (BEL)	Belgium	s.t.
5	Abdel-Kader Zaaf (FRA)	North Africa	s.t.
6	Jean Manuel Mayen (FRA)	North Africa	s.t.
7	Joseph Mirando (FRA)	France - East/South-East	s.t.
8	Pierre Brambilla (FRA)	France - East/South-East	s.t.
9	Roger Walkowiak (FRA)	France - West/South-West	+ 21"
10	Stan Ockers (BEL)	Belgium	+ 5' 52"

General classification after stage 23

Rank	Rider	Team	Time
1	Hugo Koblet (SUI)	Switzerland	132h 20' 15"
2	Raphaël Géminiani (FRA)	France	+ 22' 00"
3	Lucien Lazaridès (FRA)	France	+ 24' 16"
4	Gino Bartali (ITA)	Italy	+ 29' 09"
5	Stan Ockers (BEL)	Belgium	+ 32' 53"
6	Pierre Barbotin (FRA)	France	+ 36' 40"
7	Fiorenzo Magni (ITA)	Italy	+ 41' 24"
8	Gilbert Bauvin (FRA)	France - East/South-East	+ 45' 53"
9	Bernardo Ruiz (ESP)	Spain	+ 45' 55"
10	Fausto Coppi (ITA)	Italy	+ 46' 51"

== Stage 24 ==
29 July 1951 - Dijon to Paris, 322 km (200 mi)

Stage 24 result

Rank	Rider	Team	Time
1	Adolphe Deledda (FRA)	France - East/South-East	9h 58' 19"
2	Fiorenzo Magni (ITA)	Italy	s.t.
3	Stan Ockers (BEL)	Belgium	+ 1' 40"
4	Jean Robic (FRA)	France - Paris	s.t.
5	Germain Derycke (BEL)	Belgium	s.t.
6	Emile Baffert (FRA)	France - East/South-East	s.t.
7	Georges Aeschlimann (SUI)	Switzerland	s.t.
8	Marcel Huber (SUI)	Switzerland	s.t.
9	Hugo Koblet (SUI)	Switzerland	s.t.
10	Hans Sommer (SUI)	Switzerland	s.t.

General classification after stage 24

Rank	Rider	Team	Time
1	Hugo Koblet (SUI)	Switzerland	142h 20' 14"
2	Raphaël Géminiani (FRA)	France	+ 22' 00"
3	Lucien Lazaridès (FRA)	France	+ 24' 16"
4	Gino Bartali (ITA)	Italy	+ 29' 09"
5	Stan Ockers (BEL)	Belgium	+ 32' 53"
6	Pierre Barbotin (FRA)	France	+ 36' 40"
7	Fiorenzo Magni (ITA)	Italy	+ 39' 14"
8	Gilbert Bauvin (FRA)	France - East/South-East	+ 45' 53"
9	Bernardo Ruiz (ESP)	Spain	+ 45' 55"
10	Fausto Coppi (ITA)	Italy	+ 46' 51"
