= 1951 Tour de France =

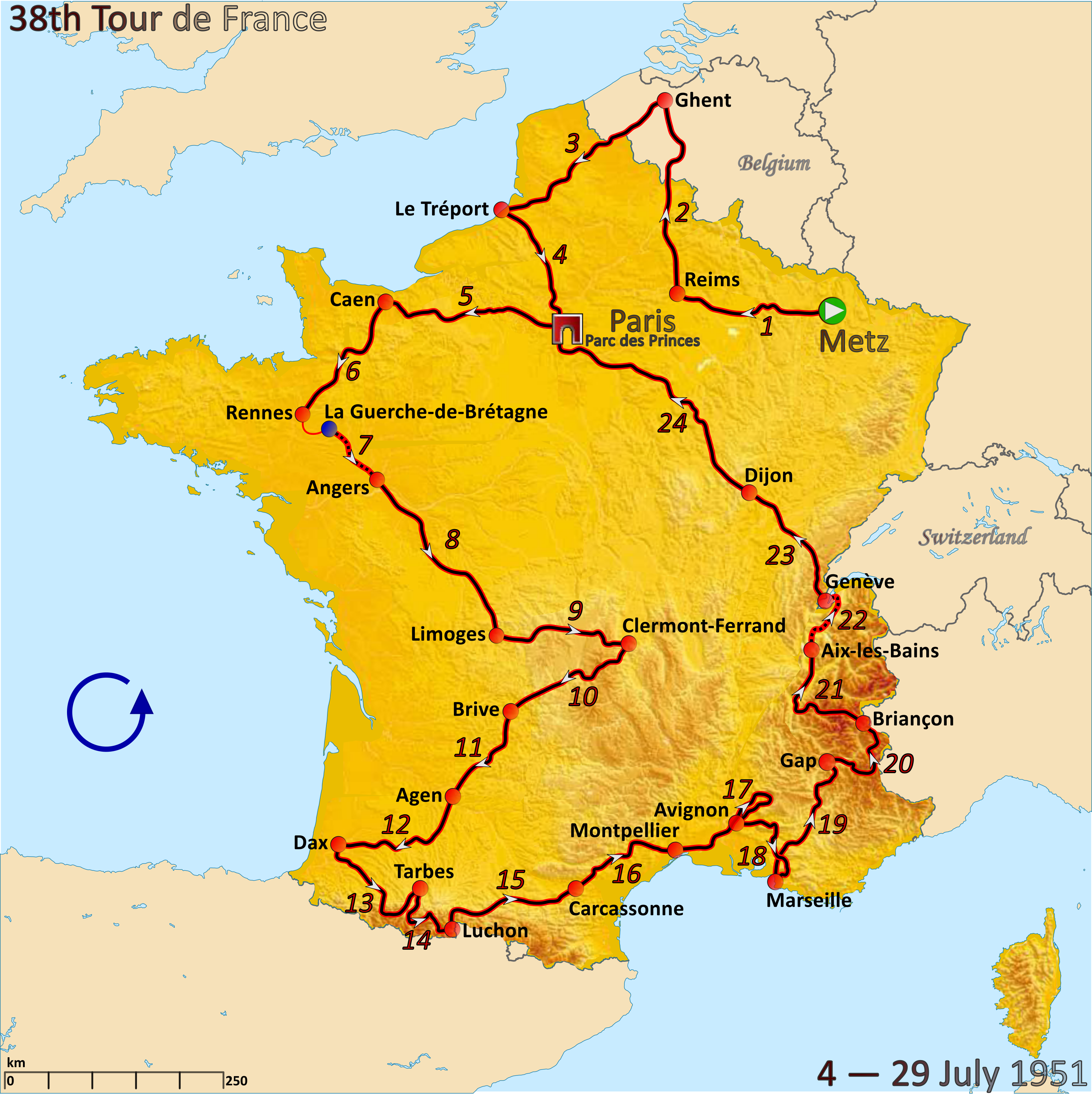
- Route of the 1951 Tour de France followed counterclockwise, starting in Metz and finishing in Paris

Race details
- Dates: 4–29 July 1951
- Stages: 24
- Distance: 4,690 km (2,910 mi)
- Winning time: 142h 20' 14"

Results
Jersey awarded to the overall winner	Winner	Hugo Koblet (SUI)	(Switzerland)
	Second	Raphaël Géminiani (FRA)	(France)
	Third	Lucien Lazaridès (FRA)	(France)
	Mountains	Raphaël Géminiani (FRA)	(France)
	Team	France	

The 1951 Tour de France was the 38th edition of the Tour de France, taking place from 4 to 29 July. It consisted of 24 stages over 4,690 km (2,914 mi). The race started outside Île-de-France for the first time since 1926; a change that remained permanent beyond 1951 with the exceptions of 1963, 1983, 1984, 1986 and 2003.

The race was won by Swiss cyclist Hugo Koblet. Koblet used his time-trial abilities to win large amounts of time. Dutch cyclist Wim van Est gained fame, not only by becoming the first Dutch cyclist to lead the Tour de France, but more by falling down a ravine in the leader's jersey.

== Teams ==
As was the custom since the 1930 Tour de France, the 1951 Tour de France was contested by national and regional teams. The three major cycling countries in 1951, Italy, Belgium and France, each sent a team of 12 cyclists. Other countries sent teams of 8 cyclists: Switzerland, Luxembourg, Netherlands and Spain. The French regional cyclists were divided into four teams of 12 cyclists: Paris, Île-de-France/North-West, East/South-East and West/South-West. The last team of eight cyclists was made up out of cyclists from the French North African colonies. In the end, Luxembourg only sent 7 cyclists, so altogether this made 123 cyclists. There were 68 French cyclists (of which 1 French-Moroccan and 7 French-Algerian), 12 Italian, 12 Belgian, 8 Dutch, 8 Spanish, 8 Swiss and 7 Luxembourgian cyclists.

The teams entering the race were:

- Switzerland
- Italy
- Belgium
- France
- Luxembourg
- Netherlands
- Spain
- Paris
- Île-de-France/North-West
- East/South-East
- West/South-West
- North Africa

== Route and stages ==
The 1951 Tour de France started in Metz; it was the second time after the 1926 Tour de France that the start of the Tour de France was not in or near Paris.

Unlike in previous years, the route was no longer around the perimeter of France, and the Massif Central mountains were visited for the first time. There were two rest days, in Limoges and Montpellier.

The highest point of elevation in the race was 2,360 m (7,740 ft) at the summit of the Col d'Izoard mountain pass on stage 20.

Stage characteristics and winners
Stage	Date	Course	Distance	Type	Winner
1	4 July	Metz to Reims	185 km (115 mi)	Plain stage	Giovanni Rossi (SUI)
2	5 July	Reims to Ghent (Belgium)	228 km (142 mi)	Plain stage	Jean Diederich (LUX)
3	6 July	Ghent (Belgium) to Le Tréport	219 km (136 mi)	Plain stage	Georges Meunier (FRA)
4	7 July	Le Tréport to Paris	188 km (117 mi)	Plain stage	Roger Lévêque (FRA)
5	8 July	Paris to Caen	215 km (134 mi)	Plain stage	Serafino Biagioni (ITA)
6	9 July	Caen to Rennes	182 km (113 mi)	Plain stage	Édouard Muller (FRA)
7	10 July	La Guerche-de-Bretagne to Angers	85 km (53 mi)	Individual time trial	Hugo Koblet (SUI)
8	11 July	Angers to Limoges	241 km (150 mi)	Plain stage	André Rosseel (BEL)
	12 July	Limoges		Rest day	
9	13 July	Limoges to Clermont-Ferrand	236 km (147 mi)	Stage with mountain(s)	Raphaël Géminiani (FRA)
10	14 July	Clermont-Ferrand to Brive	216 km (134 mi)	Stage with mountain(s)	Bernardo Ruiz (ESP)
11	15 July	Brive to Agen	177 km (110 mi)	Plain stage	Hugo Koblet (SUI)
12	16 July	Agen to Dax	185 km (115 mi)	Plain stage	Wim van Est (NED)
13	17 July	Dax to Tarbes	201 km (125 mi)	Stage with mountain(s)	Serafino Biagioni (ITA)
14	18 July	Tarbes to Luchon	142 km (88 mi)	Stage with mountain(s)	Hugo Koblet (SUI)
15	19 July	Luchon to Carcassonne	213 km (132 mi)	Stage with mountain(s)	André Rosseel (BEL)
16	20 July	Carcassonne to Montpellier	192 km (119 mi)	Plain stage	Hugo Koblet (SUI)
	21 July	Montpellier		Rest day	
17	22 July	Montpellier to Avignon	224 km (139 mi)	Stage with mountain(s)	Louison Bobet (FRA)
18	23 July	Avignon to Marseille	173 km (107 mi)	Plain stage	Fiorenzo Magni (ITA)
19	24 July	Marseille to Gap	208 km (129 mi)	Stage with mountain(s)	Armand Baeyens (BEL)
20	25 July	Gap to Briançon	165 km (103 mi)	Stage with mountain(s)	Fausto Coppi (ITA)
21	26 July	Briançon to Aix-les-Bains	201 km (125 mi)	Stage with mountain(s)	Bernardo Ruiz (ESP)
22	27 July	Aix-les-Bains to Geneva	97 km (60 mi)	Individual time trial	Hugo Koblet (SUI)
23	28 July	Geneva to Dijon	197 km (122 mi)	Stage with mountain(s)	Germain Derycke (BEL)
24	29 July	Dijon to Paris	322 km (200 mi)	Plain stage	Adolphe Deledda (FRA)
	Total		4,690 km (2,914 mi)		

== Race overview ==
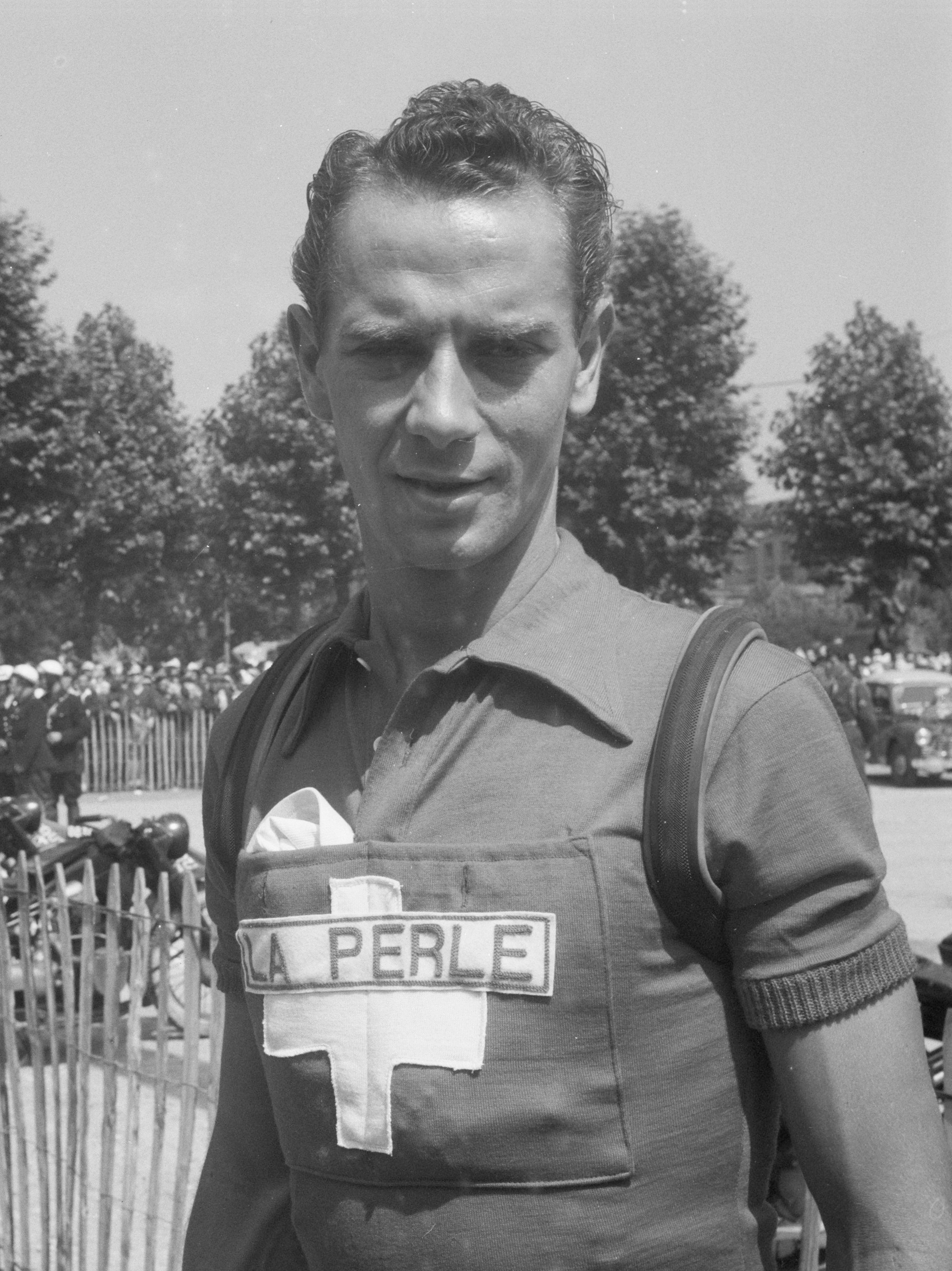
General classification winner Hugo Koblet pictured on stage one

On the first stage, Hugo Koblet attacked almost immediately from the start. The peloton got back to him after 40 km (25 mi). Koblet stayed calm for the next stages, until the individual time trial in stage seven, which he won. Initially, Bobet was reported to have won the time trial by one second. Koblet protested against the result, and argued that the intermediate timings showed that Bobet could not have won. The Tour de France jury agreed that Bobet's time was off by one minute, and Koblet was given the stage victory by 59 seconds. Koblet's rival Raphaël Géminiani after the stage said: "If there were two Koblets in the sport I would retire from cycling tomorrow."

In the eleventh stage, Koblet attacked after 37 km (23 mi). He was followed by Louis Deprez for a short while, but when Deprez fell back, Koblet was on his own. It was a hot day, and the other cyclists did not believe that Koblet's escape had any chance. When the peloton heard that Koblet was already three minutes ahead, they started to chase him. They worked together for more than 100 km, but couldn't reach Koblet, who won the stage with a margin of more than two and a half minutes. Directly after Koblet finished, he used a stopwatch to measure the time gap, because he did not trust the Tour's time keepers anymore. The other cyclists were amazed that Koblet had been able to defend his lead against all the other cyclists.

In the twelfth stage, Dutch cyclist Wim van Est escaped, won the stage and took the yellow jersey as leader of the general classification. He was the first Dutch cyclist to do so. Van Est was inexperienced in the mountains that showed up in the thirteenth stage, but did his best to defend his lead. Going up the Aubisque, Van Est punctured and lost time. He tried to gain back time on the descent by following Magni, a fast descender. Van Est could not follow, and crashed. He remounted and rode down again, but took too much risk and fell down a ravine. His fall was broken by trees, 75 meters down. Spectators helped him to climb back, by handing him a rope made from inner tubes. In the next stage, Van Est fell down a ravine while defending his position, and had to abandon the race. Gilbert Bauvin took over the lead. Géminiani crossed the finish line first in that stage, but he was set back to fourth place by the jury.

In the fourteenth stage, Coppi attacked. Koblet punctured, but chased back and reached Coppi, and outsprinted him to win the stage, and thanks to the minute bonification time as stage winner took over the lead. In the sixteenth stage, that seemed not too hard because there were almost no mountains, Coppi collapsed and lost more than half an hour. This was said to be caused by grief over his brother's death, although other accounts said it was because of food poisoning. His teammates and former rivals Gino Bartali and Fiorenzo Magni helped him until the end of the stage.

The Mont Ventoux was climbed in the seventeenth stage for the first time in Tour de France history. Bobet escaped and won the stage, while Koblet was able to stay with his competitors. After that stage, second-placed rider Géminiani was no longer trying to beat Koblet, but instead focussed on defending his second place against Bobet. Koblet stayed out of problems for the rest of the race, and won the time trial in the 22nd stage with a large margin; he even overtook Bartali who had started 8 minutes earlier.

== Classification leadership and minor prizes ==
The time that each cyclist required to finish each stage was recorded, and these times were added together for the general classification. If a cyclist had received a time bonus, it was subtracted from this total; all time penalties were added to this total. The cyclist with the least accumulated time was the race leader, identified by the yellow jersey. Of the 123 cyclists that started the 1951 Tour de France, 66 finished the race.

Points for the mountains classification were earned by reaching the mountain tops first. The system was almost the same as in 1950: there were two types of mountain tops: the hardest ones, in category 1, gave 10 points to the first cyclist, the easier ones, in category 2, gave 6 points to the first cyclist, and the easiest ones, in category 3, gave 3 points. Raphaël Géminiani won this classification.

The team classification was calculated by adding the times in the general classification of the best three cyclists per team. It was won by the French team, with a large margin over the Belgian team. The other three teams that started, Luxembourg, The Netherlands and North Africa, did not finish with three cyclists so were not eligible for the team classification. The Souvenir Henri Desgrange was given in honour of Tour founder Henri Desgrange to the first rider to pass the summit of the Col du Lautaret on stage 21. This prize was won by Gino Sciardis. The special award for the best regional rider was won by eighth-placed Gilbert Bauvin.

Classification leadership by stage
Stage	Winner	General classification	Mountains classification (Note: No jersey was awarded to the leader of the mountains classification until a white jersey with red polka dots was introduced in 1975.)	Team classification
1	Giovanni Rossi	Giovanni Rossi	no award	
2	Jean Diederich	Jean Diederich	no award	
3	Georges Meunier	Jean Diederich	no award	Luxembourg
4	Roger Lévêque	Jean Diederich	no award	France
5	Serafino Biagioni	Serafino Biagioni	no award	Italy
6	Édouard Muller	Roger Lévêque	no award	
7	Hugo Koblet	Roger Lévêque	no award	France
8	André Rosseel	Roger Lévêque	no award	France
9	Raphaël Géminiani	Roger Lévêque	Raphaël Géminiani	France
10	Bernardo Ruiz	Roger Lévêque	Bernardo Ruiz	France
11	Hugo Koblet	Roger Lévêque	Raphaël Géminiani	France
12	Wim van Est	Wim van Est	Raphaël Géminiani	West/South-West
13	Serafino Biagioni	Gilbert Bauvin	Raphaël Géminiani	
14	Hugo Koblet	Hugo Koblet	Raphaël Géminiani	France
15	André Rosseel	Hugo Koblet	Raphaël Géminiani	France
16	Hugo Koblet	Hugo Koblet	Raphaël Géminiani	France
17	Louison Bobet	Hugo Koblet	Raphaël Géminiani	France
18	Fiorenzo Magni	Hugo Koblet	Raphaël Géminiani	France
19	Armand Baeyens	Hugo Koblet	Raphaël Géminiani	France
20	Fausto Coppi	Hugo Koblet	Raphaël Géminiani	France
21	Bernardo Ruiz	Hugo Koblet	Raphaël Géminiani	France
22	Hugo Koblet	Hugo Koblet	Raphaël Géminiani	France
23	Germain Derijcke	Hugo Koblet	Raphaël Géminiani	France
24	Adolphe Deledda	Hugo Koblet	Raphaël Géminiani	France
Final		Hugo Koblet	Raphaël Géminiani	France

== Final standings ==
=== General classification ===
Final general classification (1–10)
Rank	Rider	Team	Time
1	Hugo Koblet (SUI)	Switzerland	142h 20' 14"
2	Raphaël Géminiani (FRA)	France	+ 22' 00"
3	Lucien Lazaridès (FRA)	France	+ 24' 16"
4	Gino Bartali (ITA)	Italy	+ 29' 09"
5	Stan Ockers (BEL)	Belgium	+ 32' 53"
6	Pierre Barbotin (FRA)	France	+ 36' 40"
7	Fiorenzo Magni (ITA)	Italy	+ 39' 14"
8	Gilbert Bauvin (FRA)	East/South-East	+ 45' 53"
9	Bernardo Ruiz (ESP)	Spain	+ 45' 55"
10	Fausto Coppi (ITA)	Italy	+ 46' 51"

Final general classification (11–66)
Rank	Rider	Team	Time
11	Nello Lauredi (FRA)	France	+ 57' 19"
12	Jean Diederich (LUX)	Luxembourg	+ 59' 29"
13	Marcel De Mulder (BEL)	Belgium	+ 1h 04' 18"
14	Edward Van Ende (BEL)	Belgium	+ 1h 07' 18"
15	Serafino Biagioni (ITA)	Italy	+ 1h 08' 52"
16	Georges Meunier (FRA)	West/South-West	+ 1h 13' 36"
17	Roger Decock (BEL)	Belgium	+ 1h 13' 57"
18	Marcel Verschueren (BEL)	Belgium	+ 1h 14' 36"
19	Pierre Cogan (FRA)	West/South-West	+ 1h 15' 30"
20	Louison Bobet (FRA)	France	+ 1h 24' 09"
21	Jean-Marie Goasmat (FRA)	West/South-West	+ 1h 31' 27"
22	Aloïs De Hertog (BEL)	Belgium	+ 1h 35' 04"
23	Jean Dotto (FRA)	East/South-East	+ 1h 36' 23"
24	Georges Aeschlimann (SUI)	Switzerland	+ 1h 39' 45"
25	André Rosseel (BEL)	Belgium	+ 1h 42' 22"
26	Bernard Gauthier (FRA)	France	+ 1h 51' 09"
27	Jean Robic (FRA)	Paris	+ 1h 55' 35"
28	Hans Sommer (SUI)	Switzerland	+ 1h 58' 47"
29	Franco Franchi (ITA)	Italy	+ 1h 59' 13"
30	Roger Lévêque (FRA)	West/South-West	+ 2h 01' 51"
31	Lucien Teisseire (FRA)	France	+ 2h 08' 05"
32	Adolphe Deledda (FRA)	East/South-East	+ 2h 09' 29"
33	Vincent Vitetta (FRA)	East/South-East	+ 2h 09' 45"
34	Paul Giguet (FRA)	East/South-East	+ 2h 12' 23"
35	Marcel Huber (SUI)	Switzerland	+ 2h 13' 36"
36	Pierre Brambilla (FRA)	East/South-East	+ 2h 18' 29"
37	Louis Deprez (FRA)	Île-de-France/North-West	+ 2h 25' 44"
38	Andrea Carrea (ITA)	Italy	+ 2h 28' 01"
39	Roger Buchonnet (FRA)	East/South-East	+ 2h 31' 33"
40	Armand Baeyens (BEL)	Belgium	+ 2h 34' 04"
41	Édouard Muller (FRA)	France	+ 2h 39' 02"
42	Hilaire Couvreur (BEL)	Belgium	+ 2h 47' 01"
43	Germain Derijcke (BEL)	Belgium	+ 2h 47' 16"
44	Manolo Rodríguez (ESP)	Spain	+ 2h 49' 29"
45	Louis Caput (FRA)	Paris	+ 2h 53' 38"
46	André Labeylie (FRA)	Île-de-France/North-West	+ 2h 54' 06"
47	Joseph Mirando (FRA)	East/South-East	+ 2h 58' 29"
48	Luciano Pezzi (ITA)	Italy	+ 2h 58' 38"
49	Joseph Morvan (FRA)	West/South-West	+ 2h 59' 11"
50	Gottfried Weilenmann (SUI)	Switzerland	+ 3h 01' 15"
51	Gino Sciardis (FRA)	Île-de-France/North-West	+ 3h 09' 00"
52	Ettore Milano (ITA)	Italy	+ 3h 11' 03"
53	Angelo Colinelli (FRA)	East/South-East	+ 3h 11' 58"
54	Virgilio Salimbeni (ITA)	Italy	+ 3h 12' 23"
55	Willy Kemp (LUX)	Luxembourg	+ 3h 19' 02"
56	Jean Baldassari (FRA)	France	+ 3h 20' 40"
57	Roger Walkowiak (FRA)	West/South-West	+ 3h 21' 30"
58	Dalmacio Langarica (ESP)	Spain	+ 3h 24' 24"
59	Francisco Masip (ESP)	Spain	+ 3h 40' 13"
60	Léo Weilenmann (SUI)	Switzerland	+ 3h 48' 32"
61	Jean Guéguen (FRA)	France	+ 3h 49' 47"
62	Aloïs Van Steenkiste (BEL)	Belgium	+ 3h 56' 05"
63	Jean-Louis Carle (FRA)	Paris	+ 4h 08' 53"
64	Émile Baffert (FRA)	East/South-East	+ 4h 45' 26"
65	Manuel Mayen (FRA)	North Africa	+ 4h 56' 59"
66	Abd-el-Kader Zaaf (FRA)	North Africa	+ 4h 58' 18"

=== Mountains classification ===
Final mountains classification (1–10)
Rank	Rider	Team	Points
1	Raphaël Géminiani (FRA)	France	60
2	Gino Bartali (ITA)	Italy	59
3	Fausto Coppi (ITA)	Italy	41
3	Hugo Koblet (SUI)	Switzerland	41
3	Bernardo Ruiz (ESP)	Spain	41
6	Lucien Lazaridès (FRA)	France	37
7	Jean Robic (FRA)	Paris	23
8	Bernard Gauthier (FRA)	France	22
8	Jean Dotto (FRA)	East/South-East	22
10	Robert Buchonnet (FRA)	East/South-East	18

=== Team classification ===
Final team classification
Rank	Team	Time
1	France	426h 47' 36"
2	Belgium	+ 44' 37"
3	Italy	+ 1h 22' 16"
4	East/South-East	+ 1h 48' 00"
5	West/South-West	+ 2h 15' 38"
6	Switzerland	+ 2h 49' 55"
7	Spain	+ 4h 45' 19"
8	Île-de-France/North-West	+ 5h 30' 39"
9	Paris	+ 6h 05' 29"

== Aftermath ==
Hugo Koblet would be unable to defend his title in the 1952 Tour de France, as he was injured. After that, Koblet never reached the heights that he was able to reach in 1951. Second-placed Géminiani said that he regarded himself as the winner, because Koblet did not count because he was not human. Van Est, who fell down a ravine wearing the leader's yellow jersey, starred in an advert for watch-making company Pontiac, that said "His heart stopped but his Pontiac kept time."

== Bibliography ==
- Augendre, Jacques (2016). "Guide historique" [Historical guide] (PDF). Tour de France (in French). Paris: Amaury Sport Organisation. Archived (PDF) from the original on 17 August 2016.
- McGann, Bill; McGann, Carol (2006). The Story of the Tour de France: 1903–1964. Vol. 1. Indianapolis, IN: Dog Ear Publishing. ISBN 978-1-59858-180-5.
- Nauright, John; Parrish, Charles (2012). Sports Around the World: History, Culture, and Practice. Vol. 2. Santa Barbara, CA: ABC-CLIO. ISBN 978-1-59884-300-2.
