= Hans Sommer =

Hans Sommer may refer to:

- Hans Sommer (composer) (1837–1922), opera composer
- Hans Sommer (composer, born 1904) (1904–2000), film music composer for Der Mann, der Sherlock Holmes war and other films
- Hans Sommer (cyclist) (1924–2004), Swiss cyclist
- Hans Sommer (SS officer) (1914–1987), SS officer who dynamited the synagogues of Paris, later Cold War spy
