= 1950 Tour de Suisse =

Race details
- Dates: 24 June–1 July 1950
- Stages: 8
- Distance: 1,829 km (1,136 mi)
- Winning time: 53h 28' 51"

Results
	Winner	Hugo Koblet (SUI)
	Second	Jean Goldschmit (LUX)
	Third	Aldo Ronconi (ITA)

The 1950 Tour de Suisse was the 14th edition of the Tour de Suisse cycle race and was held from 24 June to 1 July 1950. The race started and finished in Zürich. The race was won by Hugo Koblet.

== General classification ==
Final general classification

Rank	Rider	Time
1	Hugo Koblet (SUI)	53h 28' 51"
2	Jean Goldschmit (LUX)	+ 6' 49"
3	Aldo Ronconi (ITA)	+ 16' 16"
4	Jeng Kirchen (LUX)	+ 17' 55"
5	Ferdinand Kübler (SUI)	+ 23' 29"
6	Bruno Pasquini (ITA)	+ 24' 28"
7	Eduard van Ende (BEL)	+ 26' 01"
8	Martin Metzger (SUI)	+ 26' 20"
9	Armando Barducci (ITA)	+ 32' 44"
10	Pasquale Fornara (ITA)	+ 39' 54"
