= Armand Baeyens =

Belgian cyclist

Personal information
- Full name: Armand Baeyens
- Born: 22 June 1928 Iddergem, Belgium
- Died: 1 July 2013 (aged 85) Iddergem

Cycling career
- Sport: Cycling
- Discipline: Road
- Role: Rider

Major wins
- 1 stage Tour de France

Armand Baeyens (22 June 1928 – 1 July 2013) was a Belgian professional road bicycle racer, who won one stage in the 1951 Tour de France. In 2009 he was awarded a Lifetime Achievement Award at a gala in Denderleeuw.

== Major results ==
1951
Aaigem
Tour de France:

Winner stage 19

1952
Denderhoutem
1953
Aaigem
1954
Aaigem
