= Iddergem =

- Village and former municipality
- Interactive map of Iddergem
- Coordinates: 50°52′25″N 4°02′49″E
- Country: Belgium
- Region: Flanders
- Province: East Flanders
- Municipality: Denderleeuw

Area
  - Total: 2.95 km^{2} (1.14 sq mi)

Population (1 January 2025)
  - Total: 2,882
  - Density: 978/km^{2} (2,530/sq mi)
- Postal code: 9472

Iddergem is a village in the province of East Flanders, Belgium, and a sub-municipality of Denderleeuw. It was an independent municipality until the municipal reorganization of 1977 and is located in the Dender region.

== History ==
The name Iddergem is believed, according to linguist Maurits Gysseling, to refer to the settlement of the descendants of the Frankish leader Idduhario, who likely settled in the area during the 5th century.

During the Middle Ages, the Abbey of Ninove was one of the main landowners in Iddergem, including possession of the village watermill. A papal bull issued by Pope Urban III in 1186 mentions the settlement as Idrenghem.

In the 12th century, Iddergem, together with Teralfene and Erembodegem, formed part of the lordship of the Lords of Erembodegem. In 1227, the village became the personal property of the Count of Flanders and remained so until 1626.

In 1689, Iddergem was sold to the Vilain family, who retained ownership until the end of the 18th century. Following the French Revolution, it became an independent municipality, with its first mayor appointed in 1800. In 1977, it was merged with Welle into the municipality of Denderleeuw.

The Sint-Amanduskerk, a late Gothic church dating from the 15th century, was designated a protected monument in 1975.

An annual Saint Anthony celebration, including a traditional auction of a pig’s head, continues to be held in the village.

== Geography ==
Iddergem lies at an elevation of approximately 25 meters. The Molenbeek flows through the village, while the Dender runs to the east of the settlement.

== Landmarks ==
- Sint-Amanduskerk
- Eenemolen

== Notable people ==
- Jozef Van Dalem (born 1936), sprinter
