= Hugo Koblet =

Swiss cyclist (1925–1964)

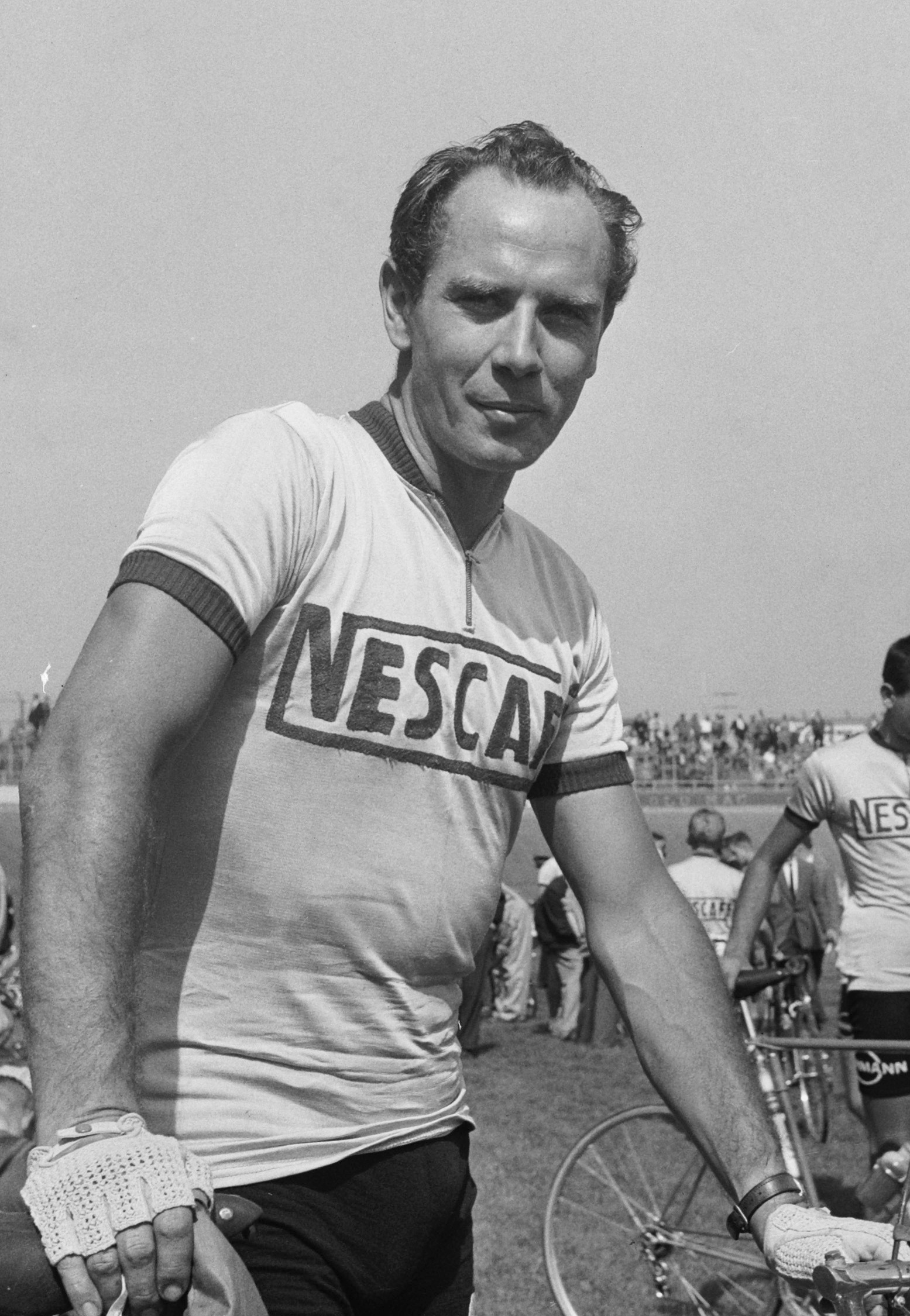
- Koblet at the 1956 Ronde van Nederland

Personal information
- Full name: Hugo Koblet
- Nicknames: Beautiful Hugo; Le pédaleur de charme (The charming pedaler)
- Born: 21 March 1925 Zürich, Switzerland
- Died: 6 November 1964 (aged 39) Uster, Canton of Zurich, Switzerland

Cycling career
- Sport: Cycling
- Disciplines: Road and Track
- Role: Rider
- Rider type: Climber

Professional teams
- 1946: Amberg/Mercier-R. Lapebie
- 1947: Amberg/Fuchs
- 1948: Tebag/Fiorelli
- 1949: Cilo
- 1950–1954: Cilo/Guerra/La Perle-Hutchinson
- 1955: Faema/Cilo
- 1956: Cilo/Saint Raphaël-R. Geminiani-Dunlop
- 1958: Cilo
- 1959: Cilo/Ghigi

Major wins
- Grand Tours Tour de France General classification (1951) Giro d'Italia General classification (1950) Mountain classification (1950)

Hugo Koblet (pronounced [ˈhuːɡo ˈkoːblɛt]; 21 March 1925 – 6 November 1964) was a Swiss champion cyclist. He won the Tour de France and the Giro d'Italia as well as competing in six-day and pursuit races on the track. He won 70 races as a professional. He died in a car accident amid speculation that he had committed suicide.

== Origins ==
Hugo Koblet was the son of Adolf and Héléna Koblet, bakers in Zürich. He lived with his mother, a widow, and with an elder brother. His brother baked bread and cakes and Hugo was restricted to sweeping the floor and making deliveries by bicycle. He left the bakery at 17 and worked as a trainee mechanic at the Oerlikon velodrome in the city. His first race was a 10 km hill-climb, which he won. That caught the attention of Léo Amberg, a Swiss former Tour de France rider who had come second in the Tour of Switzerland. Amberg insisted Koblet ride the track and Koblet became national amateur pursuit champion in 1945. He turned professional in 1946 and won the New York and Chicago six-day races. It was after the races that he developed a love of the United States, driving to California and Florida. He had learned English by watching American and British films. He won the Swiss pursuit championship every year from 1947 to 1954. In 1947 he finished third and in 1951 and 1954 second in the world championship.

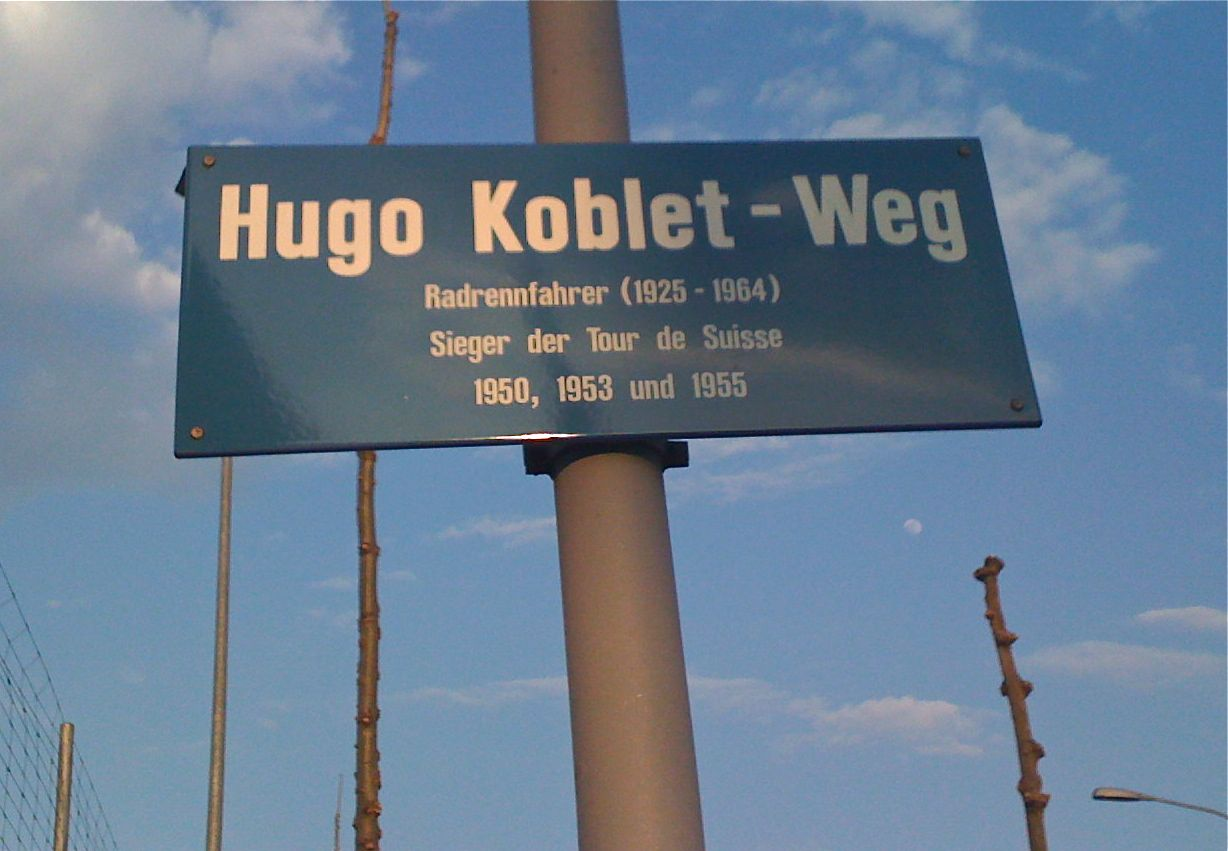
The road to the Oerlikon vélodrome in Zürich is named after Koblet.

== Professional success ==
Koblet won the 1950 Swiss road championship and then became the first non-Italian to win the Giro d'Italia. In 1951 he defeated Fausto Coppi to win the Grand Prix des Nations, an individual time trial with the status of unofficial world championship. The most important victory came that year at the Tour de France. He won overall and took five stages – two time-trials, two conventional stages and another in the mountains. In 1951 he "rode the best off his wheel" between Brive and Agen, said Cycling Plus, "just 20 miles into the stage, then covered 88 miles on his own to win by three minutes. This was despite a frantic chase by such greats as triple Tour winner Louison Bobet, double winner Gino Bartali and Fausto Coppi." The time differences when the Tour ended at the Parc des Princes meant he had beaten Raphaël Géminiani by 12 km, Lucien Lazaridès by 18, Bartali by 18 and Coppi by 27.

=== 1951 Tour de France ===
The 1951 Tour de France started in Metz, the second time outside Paris. The main riders were Louison Bobet for France, Fausto Coppi and an ageing Gino Bartali for Italy. Coppi was hindered by grief at the death of his brother, Serse. Both Coppi and Bobet were pushed out of the running when Koblet won the time-trial from La Guerche to Angers. Their position was confirmed four days later when Koblet attacked on a gentle descent after two hours of the stage from Brive to Agen, a day expected to be a quiet journey towards the Pyrenees. He won again at Luchon, Montpellier and Geneva.

== Decline and death ==
Hugo Koblet was a handsome man whose fame brought beautiful women and a lifestyle that affected his career. He was "the most charming of men to talk to", said Jock Wadley. René de Latour wrote in Sporting Cyclist: "Koblet had not an enemy at all. His ready and kindly smile came from deep down inside, and one knows from the start that this was a man without rancour, a rare thing to say of anybody who has raced in top competition on the road where the intense physical struggle often leads to jealousy and dispute."

He never rode again at the same level as the 1951 Tour de France. Jean Bobet said Koblet began to suffer in the mountains at 2,000m, then 1,500, then at 1,000 until "we saw him unable to ride over the smallest hill.". The author Olivier Dazat said photographs showed not the handsome man he had been but a rider suddenly aged, worried and preoccupied. René de Latour wrote: "There is a question mark about Hugo Koblet's life, the mystery of why he was never as good again as in the 1951 Tour. After this year, his pedalling had less power. Soon after that magnificent win, Koblet was invited to Mexico to follow the national amateur tour. When he came back he was still, it seemed, the same incredibly easy pedaller. But the efficiency was partly gone. He visited specialists and took courses of treatment, but without any real success. He went to Mexico in 1951 [and] never came back from the land of guitars and sombreros. And nobody knows why!"

In 1953 he was back in good shape and finished second in the Giro, when Coppi attacked and left him behind on the climb up the Stelvio Pass; in the 1954 Giro he had to help his domestique Carlo Clerici who whas unexpectedly leading the race, and finished again in second place. He retired from competition in 1958.

Six years after his retirement, Koblet died at 39, four days after a car crash, with speculation that his death may have been suicide. He had been profligate with his money and was in debt. He was being pursued for unpaid tax and his marriage had broken up. A witness, Émile Isler, saw Koblet driving his white Alfa Romeo at 120–140 kmh. between Zürich and Esslingen. He drove past a pear tree, turned then drove back. He passed it again finally turned a third time and drove into it.

== Personal life ==
Koblet married a 22-year-old model, Sonja Buhl, in 1953. They spent their honeymoon in Spain and bought a villa at Forch, overlooking the lake at Zürich. Pirelli and Alfa-Romeo employed him in South America but the couple returned, Koblet disappointed and confused. The marriage began to break up. His confusion included forgetting that he had signed a contract for 7 million lire for a comb to be made in his name in Italy. He and Sonja parted and Koblet moved alone into a studio apartment alongside a garage he opened near the Oerlikon velodrome.

He asked Buhl for a reconciliation in 1964 but she refused. It was later that year that he died. Buhl refused her husband's inheritance rather than take on his debts.

== Nickname ==
Koblet always carried a comb and a bottle of eau de cologne when he raced, sometimes combing his hair before the finish, always cleaning his face before meeting photographers. Philippe Brunel wrote in L'Equipe that at the end of his long ride to Agen in 1951, "followers were astonished to see him sit up, blow kisses to girls and take out of his pocket a sponge soaked in water. He was barely across the line when he rinsed his face in Perrier, combed his hair, then started his stopwatch." The music hall artist Jacques Grello nicknamed him the Pédaleur de Charme in Parisien Libéré in 1951.

== Film ==
Koblet's life was the subject of a cinema film, Hugo Koblet: Pédaleur de Charme, in 2010. It starred Manuel Löwensberg as Koblet, Sarah Bühlmann as his wife Sonja Buhl, Chantal Le Moign and Dominique Müller. It attributed his decline to "doping abuse." It was directed by Daniel von Aarburg, who included archive film and interviews with Koblet's contemporaries.

== Anecdote ==
In 1951, I was 18. One evening after the race ended, I was hanging about outside a hotel hoping to see the riders when the boss asked me to carry Koblet's suitcases to his room. I was so proud! For me, he was the greatest of them all. Well, when I went back downstairs again, I met him. He thanked me very politely and gave me two Swiss francs, an enormous amount at the time. I kept the coin for a long time, like a good-luck charm, swearing I would never spend it. And I only did, three years later, to buy a copy of Miroir Sprint which had Ferdi Kubler, my other idol, on the cover.
– Willy Schweizer, former president of the Swiss cycling union, 52 years later.

== Career achievements ==
=== Major results ===
==== Road ====
1947
1st Baden Criterium
1st Le Locle
1st Nyon Criterium
1st Oftringen Criterium
1st Stage 1a (TTT) Tour de Romandie
1st Stage 1a Tour de Suisse
3rd Zürich–Lausanne

1948
1st Genève Criterium
1st GP Lausanne
1st Stage 4b Tour de Romandie
1st Stage 5 Tour de Suisse

1949
1st Stage 3 Tour de Romandie

1950
1st Overall Giro d'Italia

1st Mountains classification
1st Stages 6 & 8

1st Overall Tour de Suisse

1st Stages 4a, 4b & 6

1st GP de Suisse
1st Aarau Criterium
1st GP von Basel
1st Payerne Criterium
2nd Overall Tour de Romandie
6th Trofeo Baracchi

1951
1st Overall Tour de France

1st Stages 7, 11, 14, 16 & 22

1st Grand Prix des Nations
1st GP de Suisse
1st Azencriterium
1st Genève Criterium
1st Genève (TTT)
1st Neuchâtel–Genève
1st Vallorbe Criterium
1st Brussel Criterium
2nd Overall Tour de Suisse

1st Stages 2 & 7

2nd Overall Tour de Romandie
6th Overall Giro d'Italia)

1st Stage 19

1952
1st Meisterschaft von Zürich
2nd Overall Tour de Romandie

1st Stage 4

8th Overall Giro d'Italia

1953
1st Overall Tour de Romandie

1st Stages 1, 2 & 3a

1st Overall Tour de Suisse

1st Stages 3, 6 & 8

1st Neuhausem
Alvalade Track Race

1st Individual Pursuit
1st Omnium

1st Stages 2b & 3 Roma–Napoli–Roma
2nd Overall Giro d'Italia

1st Stage 8

1954
1st GP de Suisse
1st Meisterschaft von Zürich
1st Cagliari–Sassari
1st Winterthur
1st GP Martini
1st Stage 3a Roma–Napoli–Roma
1st Stage 4a Tour de France
2nd Overall Giro d'Italia

1st Stages 15 & 21

3rd Overall Driedaagse van Antwerpen

1st Stages 1a & 3b

4th Trofeo Baracchi

1955
1st Road Race, National Road Championships
1st Overall Tour de Suisse

1st Stage 2

1st Giro del Ticino
1st Sète
1st Ussel
1st Winterthur
2nd Overall Tour de Romandie

1st Stage 3b

2nd Tour of Flanders
10th Overall Giro d'Italia

1st Stage 21

1956
1st Stage 9 Vuelta a España

1957
1st Cagliari
3rd Overall Tour de Romandie

1958
1st Stage 1 Clasico El Colombiano

==== Track ====
1945
1st Individual Pursuit, National Amateur Track Championships

1946
2nd Individual Pursuit, National Track Championships

1947
1st Individual Pursuit, National Track Championships
3rd Individual Pursuit, UCI Track Cycling world Championships

1948
1st Individual Pursuit, National Track Championships
1st Chicago Six Days

1949
1st Individual Pursuit, National Track Championships
1st New York City Six Days

1950
1st Individual Pursuit, National Track Championships
1st Hannover Six Days

1951
1st Individual Pursuit, National Track Championships

1952
1st Individual Pursuit, National Track Championships
1st Dortmund Six Days I
1st Dortmund Six Days II
1st Frankfurt am Main Six Days

1953
1st Individual Pursuit, European Track Cycling Championships
1st Individual Pursuit, National Track Championships
1st Brussel Six Days
1st Frankfurt am Main Six Days

1954
1st Madison, European Track Cycling Championships
1st Individual Pursuit, National Track Championships
1st Zürich Six Days

1955
1st Dortmund Six Days

1957
1st Madison, Prix Houlier-Comès

=== Grand Tour results timeline ===
	1950	1951	1952	1953	1954	1955	1956
Giro d'Italia	1	6	8	2	2	10	DNE
Stages won	2	1	0	1	2	1	—
Mountains classification	1	NR	NR	NR	NR	NR	—
Points classification	N/A	N/A	N/A	N/A	N/A	N/A	N/A
Tour de France	DNE	1	DNE	DNF-10	DNF-13	DNE	DNE
Stages won	—	5	—	0	0	—	—
Mountains classification	—	3	—	—	NR	NR	—
Points classification	N/A	N/A	N/A	—	NR	NR	—
Vuelta a España	DNE	N/A	N/A	N/A	N/A	DNE	DNF
Stages won	—	N/A	N/A	N/A	N/A	—	1
Mountains classification	—	N/A	N/A	N/A	N/A	—	NR
Points classification	N/A	N/A	N/A	N/A	N/A	N/A	N/A

Legend
1	Winner
2–3	Top three-finish
4–10	Top ten-finish
11–	Other finish
DNE	Did not enter
DNF-x	Did not finish (retired on stage x)
DNS-x	Did not start (not started on stage x)
HD-x	Finished outside time limit (occurred on stage x)
DSQ	Disqualified
N/A	Race/classification not held
NR	Not ranked in this classification

Awards
Preceded by (Switzerland) Armin Scheurer	Swiss Sportsman of the Year; 1951	Succeeded by (Switzerland) Josef Stalder
