= Édouard Muller (cyclist) =

French cyclist (1919–1997)

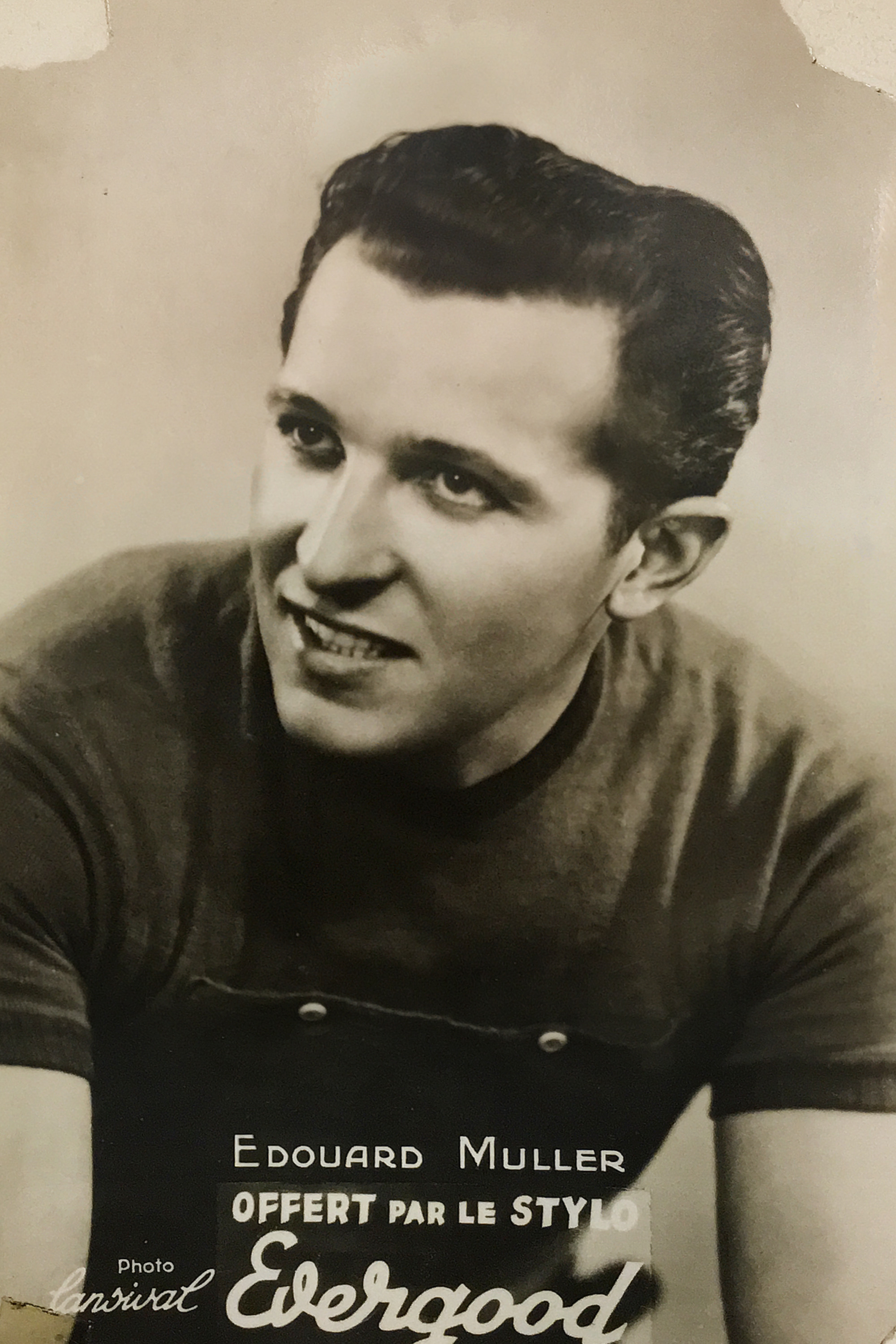

Personal information
- Full name: Édouard Muller
- Born: 8 June 1919 Neuilly sur Seine, France
- Died: 28 May 1997 (aged 77) Maisons-Laffitte, France

Cycling career
- Sport: Cycling
- Discipline: Road
- Role: Rider

Major wins
- 1 stage Tour de France

Édouard Muller (8 June 1919, in Neuilly sur Seine – 28 May 1997, in Maisons-Laffitte) was a French professional road bicycle racer.

== Major results ==
1947
Tour de l'Ouest
1951
GP des Alliés
Paris - Clermont-Ferrand
Paris - Montceau-les-Mines
Tour de France:

Winner stage 6

1953
GP d'Espéraza
