= Roger Lévêque =

French cyclist

Personal information
- Full name: Roger Lévêque
- Born: 5 December 1920 Saint-Nazaire, France
- Died: 29 June 2002 (aged 81) Saint-Avertin, France

Cycling career
- Sport: Cycling
- Discipline: Road
- Role: Rider

Major wins
- One stage 1951 Tour de France; 6 days in yellow jersey

Roger Lévêque (5 December 1920 in Saint-Nazaire – 29 June 2002 in Saint-Avertin) was a professional French road racing cyclist from 1946 to 1953. His only victory was the 4th stage of the 1951 Tour de France, and in the same Tour he wore the yellow jersey for 6 days.

== Tour de France results ==
1947 Tour de France
24th place
1948 Tour de France
did not finish
1949 Tour de France
31st place
1951 Tour de France
30th place
Winner of 4th stage
Wearing the yellow jersey for 6 days
