= Giovanni Rossi (bicycle racer) =

Swiss cyclist

Personal information
- Full name: Giovanni Rossi
- Born: 7 May 1926 Bidart, France
- Died: 17 September 1983 (aged 57) Ponte Tresa, Switzerland

Cycling career
- Sport: Cycling
- Discipline: Road
- Role: Rider

Professional team
- 1949–1954: –

Major wins
- One stage Tour de France; One stage Tour de Suisse

Giovanni Rossi (7 May 1926 – 17 September 1983) was a Swiss professional road bicycle racer. He was professional from 1949 to 1954, during which he won two victories. In the only Tour de France that he participated in, Rossi won the first stage and wore the yellow jersey as leader of the general classification for one stage after his win. His other victory was a stage win in the Tour de Suisse, also in 1951. He also finished second in another stage in that year's Tour de France and came second in the 1951 Swiss road race championships behind 1950 Tour de France winner Ferdinand "Ferdi" Kübler.

He also competed in the individual and team road race events at the 1948 Summer Olympics.

== Major results ==
1951
Circuit de la Côte d'Or
Tour de France:

Winner stage 1
Wearing yellow jersey for one day

Tour de Suisse: one stage
