= Denderleeuw =

- Municipality
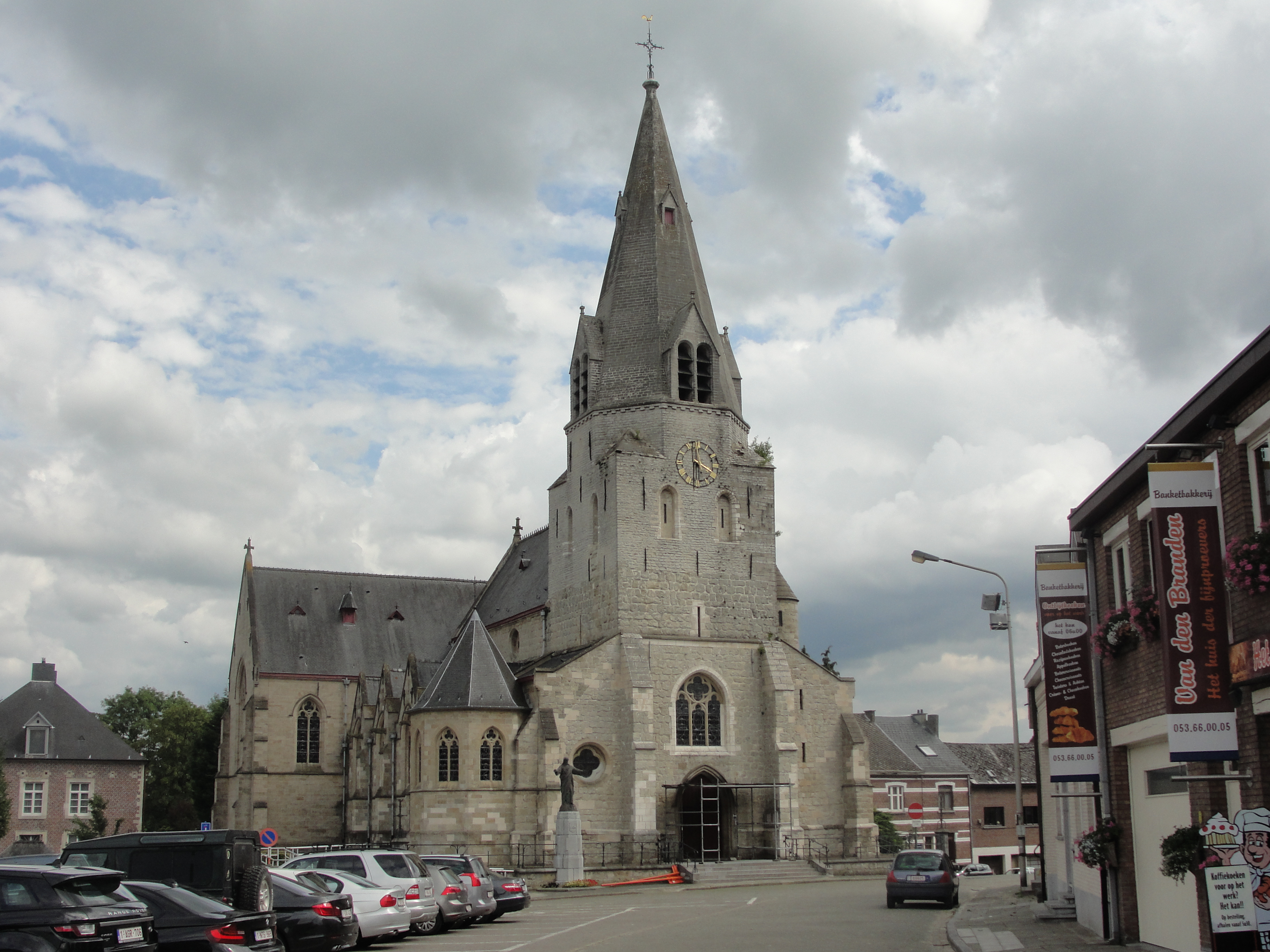
- St Amandus Church

- Flag Coat of arms

- Location of Denderleeuw in East Flanders
- Interactive map of Denderleeuw
- Location in Belgium
- Coordinates: 50°53′N 04°04′E
- Country: Belgium
- Community: Flemish Community
- Region: Flemish Region
- Province: East Flanders
- Arrondissement: Aalst

Government
  - Mayor: Jo Fonck (LvB)
  - Governing parties: LvB, CD&V, Groen

Area
  - Total: 13.86 km^{2} (5.35 sq mi)

Population (2018-01-01)
  - Total: 20,086
  - Density: 1,449/km^{2} (3,753/sq mi)
- Postal codes: 9470, 9472, 9473
- NIS code: 41011
- Area codes: 053
- Website: www.denderleeuw.be

Denderleeuw (Dutch pronunciation: [ˌdɛndərˈleːu]) is a municipality located in the Belgian province of East Flanders in the Denderstreek. The municipality comprises the towns of Denderleeuw proper, Iddergem and Welle. In 2021, Denderleeuw had a total population of 20,730. The total area is 13.77 km^{2}. The river Dender flows through the municipality.

The current mayor of Denderleeuw is Jo Fonck, from the LvB. F.C.V. Dender E.H. is the biggest football club in the city. They play in the Challenger Pro League, the second tier in Belgium.
