= Jean Manuel Mayen =

Algerian cyclist

Personal information
- Born: 26 March 1930
- Died: 30 March 2011 (aged 81)

Cycling career
- Sport: Cycling
- Role: Rider

Jean Manuel Mayen (26 March 1930 – 30 March 2011) was an Algerian racing cyclist. He rode in the 1951 Tour de France.
