= Marcel Huber =

Swiss cyclist (1927–2014)

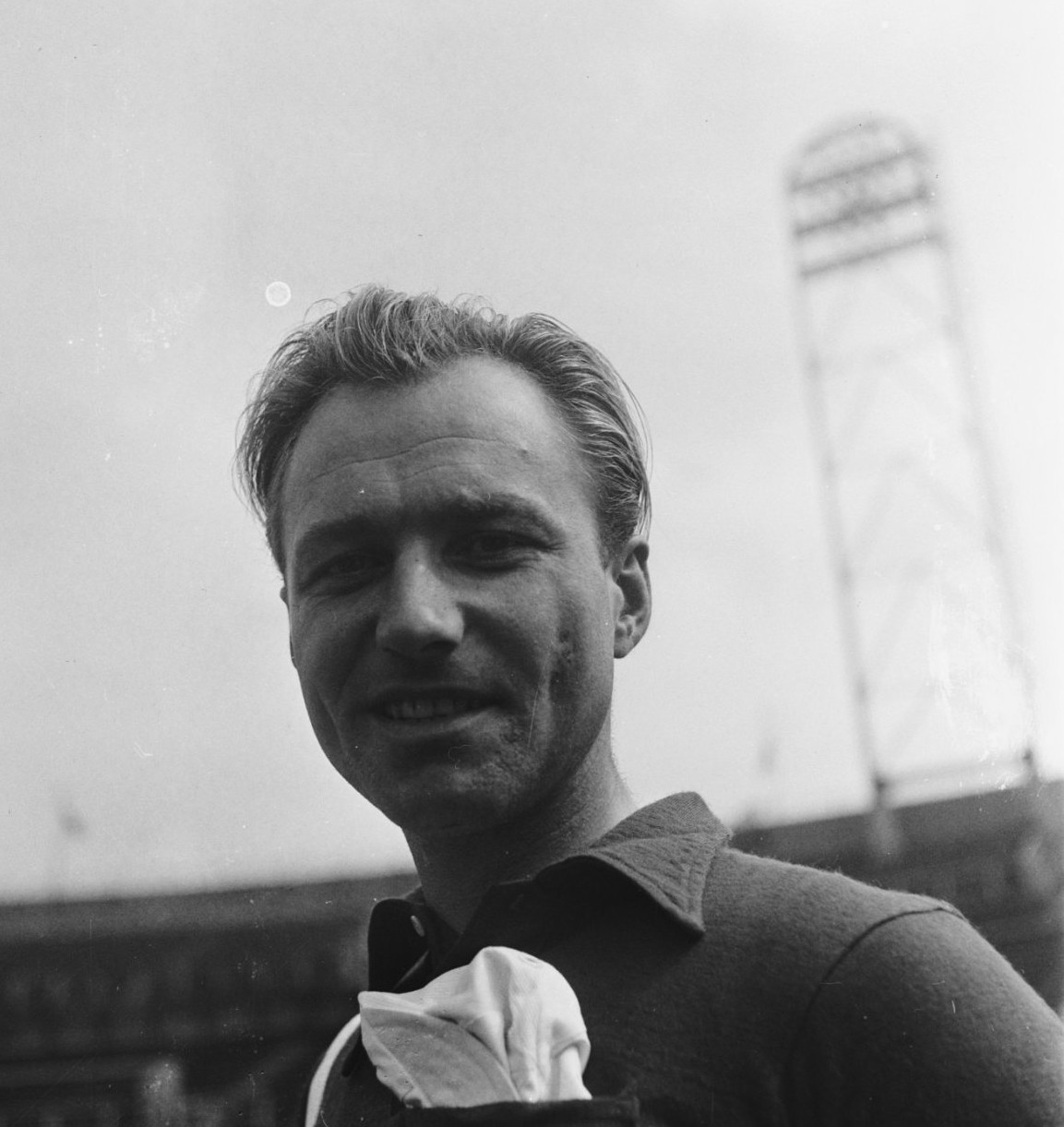

Personal information
- Born: 25 June 1927 Geneva, Switzerland
- Died: 15 December 2014 (aged 87) Pleubian, France

Cycling career
- Sport: Cycling
- Role: Rider

Marcel Huber (25 June 1927 – 15 December 2014) was a Swiss racing cyclist. He rode in the 1951 Tour de France. Huber died in Pleubian, France on 15 December 2014, at the age of 87.
