= Hans Sommer (cyclist) =

Swiss cyclist

Personal information
- Born: 18 May 1924
- Died: 27 March 2004 (aged 79)

Cycling career
- Sport: Cycling
- Role: Rider

Hans Sommer (18 May 1924 – 27 March 2004) was a Swiss racing cyclist. He rode in the 1951 Tour de France, finishing in 28th place.
