= Eduard Van Ende =

Belgian cyclist

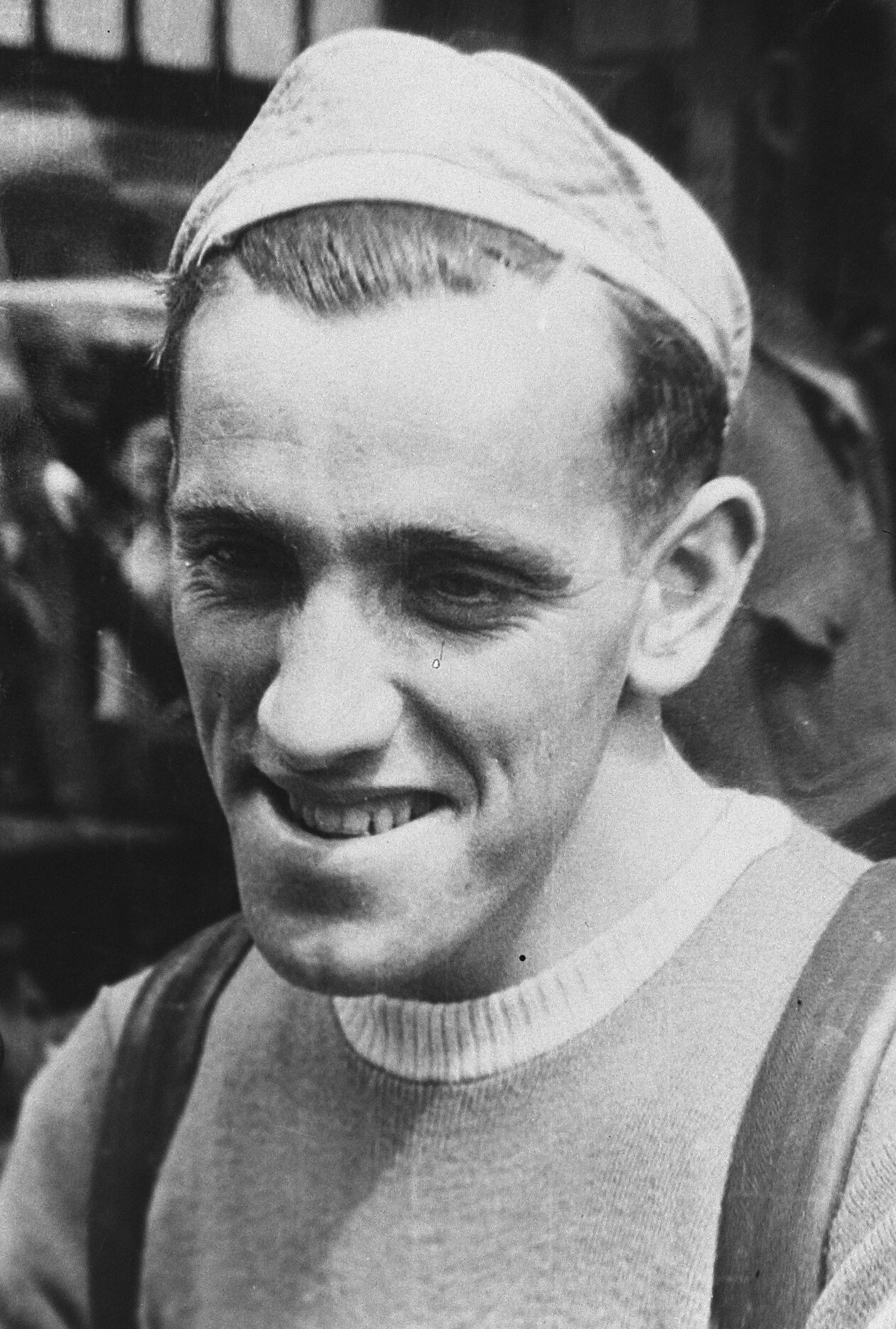
- Van Ende in 1952

Personal information
- Born: 19 December 1926
- Died: 9 February 2008 (aged 81)

Cycling career
- Sport: Cycling
- Role: Rider

Eduard Van Ende (19 December 1926 – 9 February 2008) was a Belgian racing cyclist. He rode in the 1950 Tour de France.
