= Marcel De Mulder =

Belgian cyclist

Personal information
- Born: 29 March 1928 Nokere, Belgium
- Died: 18 May 2011 (aged 83) Belgium

Cycling career
- Sport: Cycling
- Role: Rider

Marcel De Mulder (29 March 1928 – 18 May 2011) was a Belgian racing cyclist. He finished 21st in the 1949 Tour de France. He finished in seventh place in the 1954 Paris–Roubaix.
