= Lucien Lazaridès =

French cyclist (1922–2005)

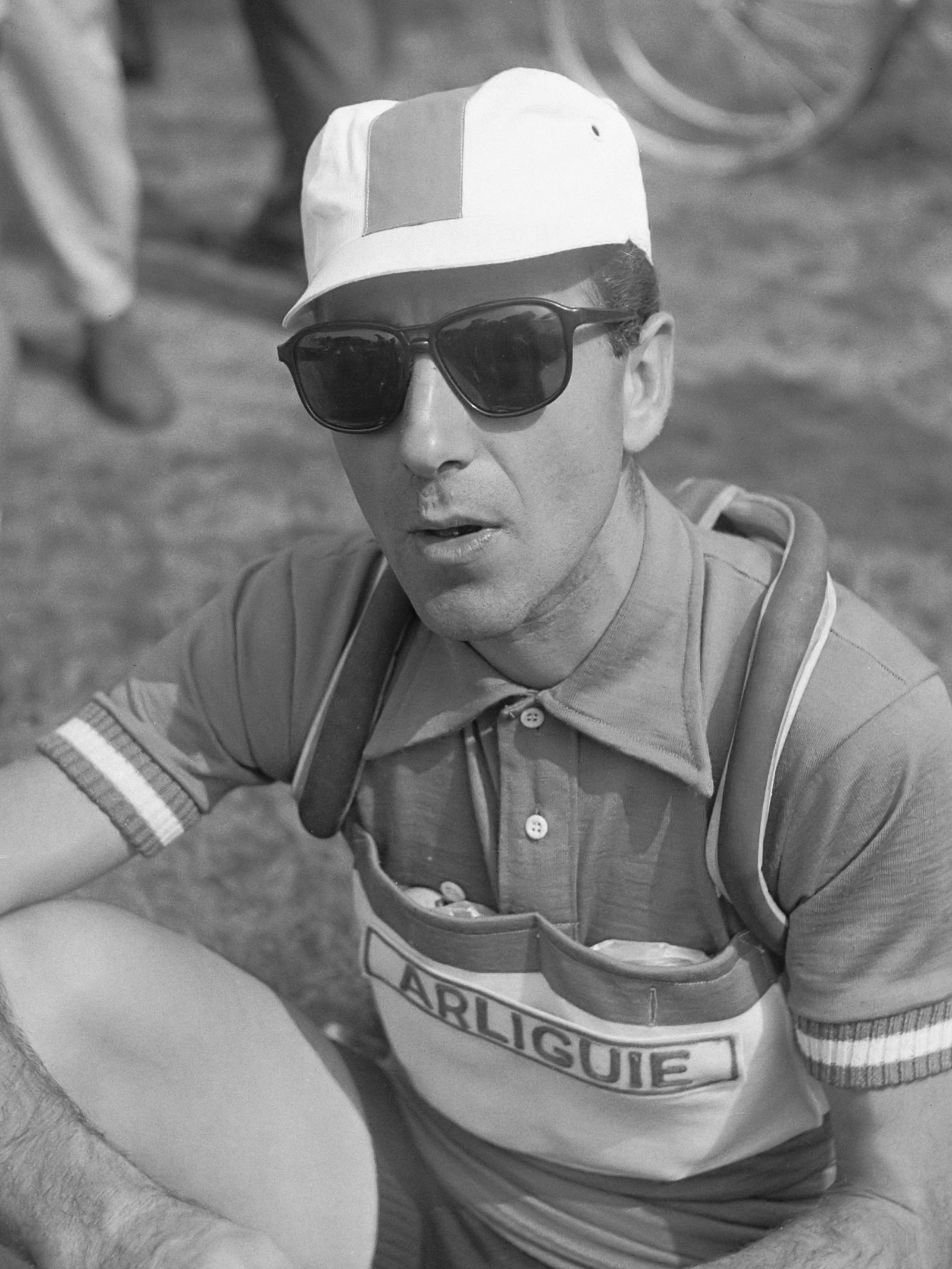

Personal information
- Full name: Lucien Lazaridès
- Born: 30 December 1922 Athens, Kingdom of Greece
- Died: 19 July 2005 (aged 82) Cannes, France

Cycling career
- Sport: Cycling
- Discipline: Road
- Role: Rider

Major wins
- Grand Tours Tour de France 2 individual stages (1954, 1955) Stage races Criterium du Dauphiné Libéré (1949)

Lucien Lazaridès (30 December 1922 — 19 July 2005) was a French professional road bicycle racer. Lazaridès was born with Greek nationality but became French in 1929. Lucien Lazaridès was an older brother of cyclist Apo Lazaridès. Lazaridès won the Dauphiné Libéré in 1949 and reached the podium of the Tour de France in 1951. Later in his career he won two Tour de France stages.

== Major results ==
1949
Nice - Mont Agel
Critérium du Dauphiné Libéré
1951
Tour de France:

3rd place overall classification

1954
Tour de France:

Winner stage 17

1955
Tour de France:

Winner stage 10
