= List of teams and cyclists in the 1947 Giro d'Italia =

The 1947 Giro d'Italia was the 30th edition of the Giro d'Italia, one of cycling's Grand Tours. The field consisted of 84 riders, and 50 riders finished the race.

== By rider ==
Legend
No.	Starting number worn by the rider during the Giro
Pos.	Position in the general classification
DNF	Denotes a rider who did not finish

No.	Name	Nationality	Team	Ref
1	Gino Bartali	Italy	Legnano–Pirelli	
2	Mario Ricci	Italy	Legnano–Pirelli	
3	Aldo Bini	Italy	Legnano–Pirelli	
4	Angelo Brignole	Italy	Legnano–Pirelli	
5	Leopoldo Ricci	Italy	Legnano–Pirelli	
6	Renzo Zanazzi	Italy	Legnano–Pirelli	
7	Valeriano Zanazzi	Italy	Legnano–Pirelli	
8	Fausto Coppi	Italy	Bianchi	
9	Adolfo Leoni	Italy	Bianchi	
10	Luigi Casola	Italy	Bianchi	
11	Mario Vicini	Italy	Bianchi	
12	Serse Coppi	Italy	Bianchi	
13	Augusto Introzzi	Italy	Bianchi	
14	Glauco Servadei	Italy	Bianchi	
15	Vito Ortelli	Italy	Benotto	
16	Aldo Ronconi	Italy	Benotto	
17	Oreste Conte	Italy	Benotto	
18	Sergio Maggini	Italy	Benotto	
19	Luciano Maggini	Italy	Benotto	
20	Serafino Biagioni	Italy	Benotto	
21	Antonio Ausenda	Italy	Benotto	
22	Sylvère Maes	Belgium	Olmo	
23	Lucien Vlaemynck	Belgium	Olmo	
24	Roger Desmet	Belgium	Olmo	
25	Bartolo Bof	Italy	Olmo	
26	Emilio Croci Torti	Switzerland	Olmo	
27	Quirino Toccaceli	Italy	Olmo	
28	Aldo Baito	Italy	Olmo	
29	Giulio Bresci	Italy	Welter	
30	Alfredo Martini	Italy	Welter	
31	Ezio Cecchi	Italy	Welter	
32	Secondo Barisone	Italy	Welter	
33	Vittorio Magni	Italy	Welter	
34	Enzo Bellini	Italy	Welter	
35	Luigi Malabrocca	Italy	Welter	
36	Michele Motta	Italy	Lygie	
37	Antonio Bevilacqua	Italy	Lygie	
38	Salvatore Crippa	Italy	Lygie	
39	Domenico De Zan	Italy	Lygie	
40	Vittorio Seghezzi	Italy	Lygie	
41	Armando Peverelli	Italy	Lygie	
42	Angelo Menon	Italy	Lygie	
43	Giordano Cottur	Italy	Wilier Triestina	
44	Egidio Feruglio	Italy	Wilier Triestina	
45	Gildo Monari	Italy	Wilier Triestina	
46	Giannino Piccolroaz	Italy	Wilier Triestina	
47	Guido De Santi	Italy	Wilier Triestina	
48	Vincenzo Rossello	Italy	Wilier Triestina	
49	Vittorio Rossello	Italy	Wilier Triestina	
50	Alfio Fazio	Italy	Viscontea	
51	Fiorenzo Magni	Italy	Viscontea	
52	Giovanni Corrieri	Italy	Viscontea	
53	Elio Bertocchi	Italy	Viscontea	
54	Giovanni De Stefanis	Italy	Viscontea	
55	Giovanni Ronco	Italy	Viscontea	
56	Giuseppe Petrocchi	Italy	Viscontea	
57	Angelo Brignole	Italy	Arbos–Talbot	
58	Giovanni Brotto	Italy	Arbos–Talbot	
59	Severino Canavesi	Italy	Arbos–Talbot	
60	Walter Generati	Italy	Arbos–Talbot	
61	Attilio Lambertini	Italy	Arbos–Talbot	
62	Medoro Zanacchi	Italy	Arbos–Talbot	
63	Francesco Locatelli	Italy	Arbos–Talbot	
64	Primo Volpi	Italy	Cozzi–Silger	
65	Gino Fondi	Italy	Cozzi–Silger	
66	Enzo Coppini	Italy	Cozzi–Silger	
67	Sergio Pagliazzi	Italy	Cozzi–Silger	
68	Aimone Landi	Italy	Cozzi–Silger	
69	Alberto Roggi	Italy	Cozzi–Silger	
70	Mauro Monti	Italy	Cozzi–Silger	
71	Antonio Covolo	Italy	Monterosa	
72	Enea Antolini	Italy	Monterosa	
73	Spirito Godio	Italy	Monterosa	
74	Loris Zanotti	Italy	Monterosa	
75	Angelo Mazzola	Italy	Monterosa	
76	Giuseppe Barella	Italy	Monterosa	
77	Ernesto Ciardossino	Italy	Monterosa	
78	Guido Lelli	Italy	Wally	
79	Egidio Marangoni	Italy	Wally	
80	Ubaldo Pugnaloni	Italy	Wally	
81	Amerigo Agati	Italy	Wally	
82	Ilio Simoni	Italy	Wally	
83	Athos Guizzardi	Italy	Wally	
84	Settimio Simonini	Italy	Wally	
