= Giordano Cottur =

Italian cyclist

Personal information
- Born: 24 May 1914 Trieste, Austria-Hungary
- Died: 8 March 2006 (aged 91) Trieste, Italy

Cycling career
- Sport: Cycling
- Discipline: Road Racing
- Role: Rider
- Rider type: Climber; All-rounder

Amateur teams
- 1932: S.C. Olimpia Trieste
- 1933: S.S. San Giusto Trieste
- 1934: Dopol. San Giusto Trieste
- 1935-1938: Dopol. Ferroviario Trieste

Professional teams
- 1938-1940: Lygie
- 1941-1942: Viscontea
- 1943-1945: Individual
- 1945-1949: Wilier Triestina
- 1946: Ray-Dunlop
- 1949: Allegro
- 1950: Individual

Managerial teams
- 1950-1951: Wilier Triestina
- 1953-1954: Bottecchia
- 1955: Leo-Chlorodont
- 1956-1957: Bottecchia

Major wins
- 5 stages Giro d'Italia

Giordano Cottur (24 May 1914 – 8 March 2006) was an Italian road cyclist. He was born in Trieste. His palmarès include three 3rd places overall at the Giro d'Italia (1940, 1948 and 1949, plus five stage wins) and an 8th overall at the 1947 Tour de France.

== Racing career ==
He started competing as an amateur in the 1930s, he was particularly active with the amateur team Dopolavoro Ferroviario di Trieste (after-work railways of Trieste), during which time he want two editions of the Bassano-Monte Grappa as well as a Biella-Santuario di Oropa, both uphill races showing his ability as a climber.

He became a professional in 1938 with the Lygie team, followed by some time racing with Viscontea and Wilier Triestina. He competed in seven editions of the Giro d'Italia, finishing third on three occasions, in 1940, 1948 and 1949. He obtained 5 stage wins between 1938 and 1948, wearing the pink jersey for a total of 14 days.

Cottur also competed in three Tour de France with a best finish of eighth place in 1947. Other notable career results include winning the 1939 Giro dell'Umbria, second place in the 1939 Giro del Lazio, fourth at the 1942 Milan–San Remo and third at the 1947 Giro del Lazio. He retired from racing in 1950.

=== 1946 Giro d'Italia ===
Cottur is remembered for the events of the 1946 Giro d'Italia. 1946 was the first running of the race following the Second World War and his home city of Trieste was involved in a territorial dispute between Italy and Tito's Yugoslavia, which would only begin to settle the following year.

Cottur was the team captain of a strong Wilier Triestina with strong sponsorship ties to the city of Trieste. He started off the Giro strongly, winning the first stage (Milan to Turin) by almost 1 minute from Wilier Triestina teammate Bevilacqua, this would prove to be a popular victory due to the disputed status of Trieste, combined with the recent news that the city had recently been taken of the itenarary of the Giro.

He would lose the pink jersey to Bevilacqua the following day, and by the end of the 11th stage he had fallen to fifth, more than 8 minutes behind the leader Vito Ortelli.

The allied forces eventually decided to allow the 12th stage of the Giro from Rovigo to Trieste to go ahead as planned on the 30th of June. About 40 km from Trieste, in the vicinity of Pieris, near San Canzian d'Isonzo the cyclists were met by a group of pro-Tito demonstrators who had blocked the road. Demonstrators threw stones and nails at the riders and shots were fired during the confrontation between police and the demonstrators. The organizers decided to cancel the stage and move the start of the following stage from Trieste to Udine for public order reasons, however a group of 17 riders, led by Cottur, were determined to continue to Trieste. They were escorted to the city under armed guard and Cottur was the first to cross the finish line.

Upon his arrival Cottur was greeted as a hero and the event was seen as a symbolic victory for the pro-Italian side. Cottur would eventually finish the Giro in 8th place, 38 minutes and 28 seconds behind winner Gino Bartali.

== Retirement ==
After his retirement, Cottur managed some professional teams, including two seasons with his former team Wilier Triestina. In 1956 he founded the cycling club S.C. Cottur, which he directed until his death in 2006.

== Legacy ==
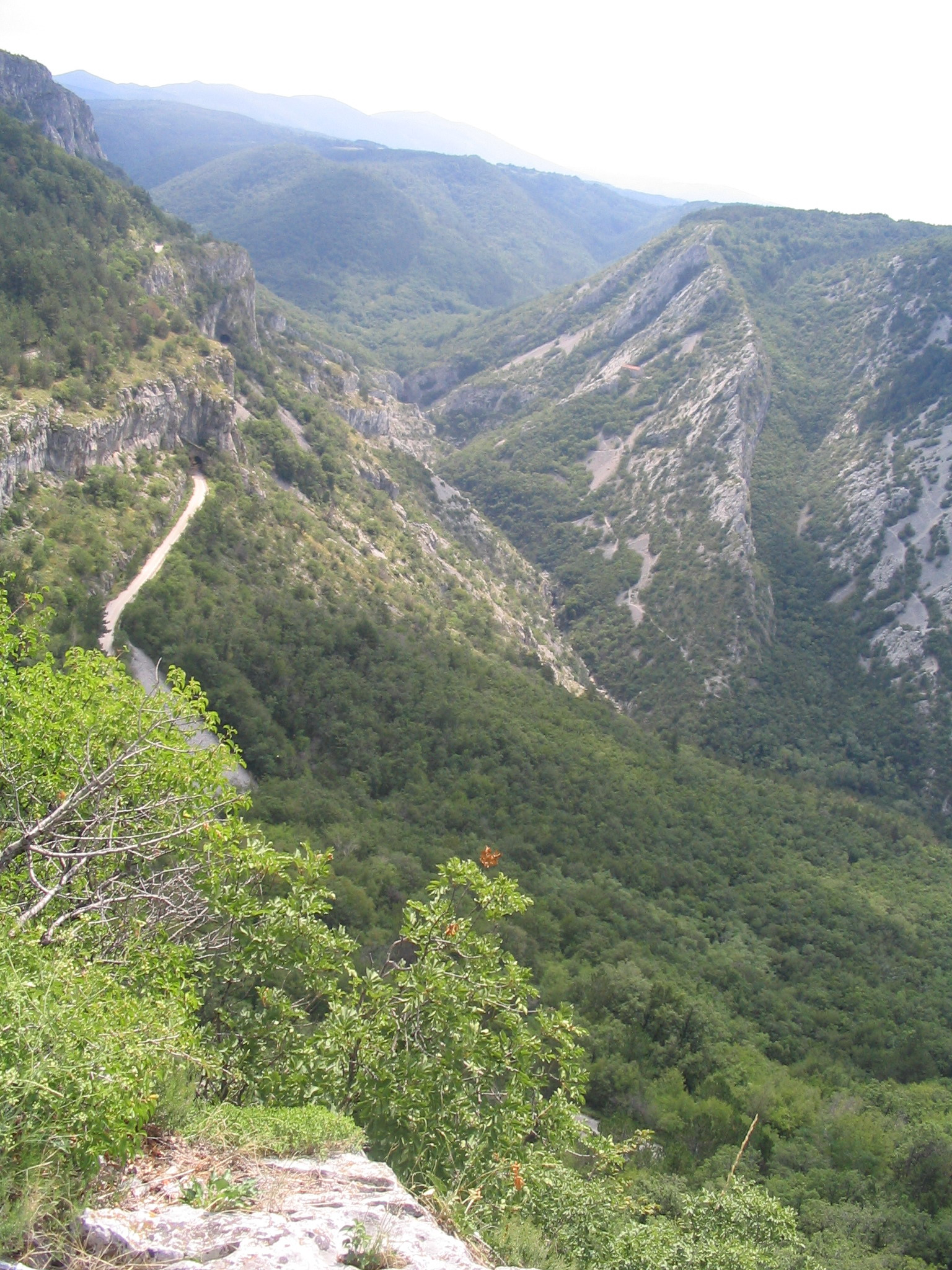
Photo of the Rosandra Valley with a section of the Giordano Cottur cyclepath visible on the left

His biography was published in 2009, titled Giordano Cottur - Il padre il figlio e la bicicletta. His city of Trieste named a cyclepath after him beginning in the city center in San Giacomo and following the route of the former Trieste-Erpelle railway going through the Rosandra Valley up to the border with Slovenia, past Draga Sant'Elia.

== Honours ==
Order of Merit of the Italian Republic - ribbon for ordinary uniform

Order of Merit of the Italian Republic
— Rome, 2 June 1999. By request of the Presidency of the Council of Ministers

== Major results ==
1938
Giro d'Italia:

Winner stage 9

1939
Giro d'Italia:

Winner stage 12

7th place overall classification

Giro dell'Umbria
1940
Giro d'Italia:

3rd place overall classification

1946
Giro d'Italia:

Winner stage 1
8th place overall classification

1947
Giro d'Italia:

Winner stage 6

Tour de France:

8th place overall classification

1948
Giro d'Italia:

Winner stage 1
3rd place overall classification

1949
Giro d'Italia:

3rd place overall classification

=== Grand Tour general classification results timeline ===
Grand Tour	1938	1939	1940	1941	1942	1943	1944	1945	1946	1947	1948	1949
Giro d'Italia	33	7	3	Not held					8	DNF	3	3
Tour de France	25	—	Not held							8	DNF	—

=== Classics results timeline ===
Monuments results timeline
Monument	1938	1939	1940	1941	1942	1943	1944	1945	1946	1947	1948	1949
Milan–San Remo	34	—	DNF	6	4	27	Not held		20	10	7	26
Tour of Flanders	Did not contest during career											
Paris–Roubaix	Did not contest during career											
Liège–Bastogne–Liège	Did not contest during career											
Giro di Lombardia	25	14	16	14	—	Not held		—	28	15	18	42

Legend
—	Did not compete
DNF	Did not finish
DSQ	Disqualified
