= 1949 Giro d'Italia =

Race details
- Dates: 21 May - 12 June 1949
- Stages: 19
- Distance: 4,088 km (2,540 mi)
- Winning time: 125h 25' 50"

Results
Jersey awarded to the overall winner	Winner	Fausto Coppi (ITA)	(Bianchi)
	Second	Gino Bartali (ITA)	(Bartali)
	Third	Giordano Cottur (ITA)	(Wilier Triestina)
	Mountains	Fausto Coppi (ITA)	(Bianchi)
	Sprints	Oreste Conti (ITA)	(Bianchi)
	Team	Wilier Triestina	

The 1949 Giro d'Italia was the 32nd Giro d'Italia, organized and sponsored by the newspaper La Gazzetta dello Sport. The race began on 21 May in Palermo with a stage that stretched 261 km (162 mi) to Catania, finishing in Monza on 12 June after a 267 km (166 mi) stage and a total distance covered of 4,088 km (2,540 mi). The race was won by Fausto Coppi of the Bianchi team, with fellow Italians Gino Bartali and Giordano Cottur coming in second and third respectively.

Coppi won the overall by way of the memorable 17th stage (from Cuneo to Pinerolo), in which he escaped from the group and climbed alone the Maddalena Pass, the Col de Vars, the Col d'Izoard, the Col de Montgenèvre and the Sestriere Pass, arriving in Pinerolo 11'52" ahead of Bartali, his tenacious antagonist during those years.

== Teams ==
A total of 15 teams were invited to participate in the 1949 Giro d'Italia. Each team sent a squad of seven riders, so the Giro began with a peloton of 105 cyclists. Out of the 105 riders that started this edition of the Giro d'Italia, a total of 65 riders made it to the finish in Monza.

The teams entering the race were:

- Arbos
- Atala
- Bartali
- Benotto
- Bianchi
- Bottecchia
- Cimatti
- Edelweiss
- Fiorelli
- Fréjus
- Ganna
- Legnano
- Stucchi
- Viscontea
- Wilier Triestina

Defending champion Fiorenzo Magni was planning to ride the 1949 Giro, but was sick at the start, and was replaced by a different rider.

== Pre-race favorites ==
The main favorites entering the race were Gino Bartali and Fausto Coppi. Vito Ortelli, who placed fourth the year prior did not participate as he was suffering from an illness and stayed home. l'Unità's Attilio Camoriano wrote that Coppi's form entering the race could allow him to gain the lead early on and hold it from Bartali, who was known to take several stages to warm up and adjust to the race. Camoriano added that Bartali would likely not let that happen as he was known to find strength and referenced previous Tours de France. He further stated that Coppi's Bianchi team was stronger and better organized than Bartali's eponymous team. Aside from the aforementioned contenders, Fiorelli's Jean Goldschmit was thought to be the team's best contender as Ganna–Ursus's Albert Dubuisson was known to fade on climbs.

== Route and stages ==
The route for this edition of the Giro d'Italia was announced on 7 February 1949. The stages involving the Piedmont region were finalized on 24 March. The race was scheduled to begin at 8 am at the Villa Giulia in Palermo. Attilio Camoriano of l'Unità stated that the riders were likely to use their heavy, thicker tires because after the Santo Stefano junction, the roads contained lava rocks from Mount Etna throughout and those were known to cut tires easily. The Sicilian government offered race organizers ten million lire to host the start of the Giro.

Prior to the start of the race, bandit Salvatore Giuliano who had been on the run near Sicily's Montelepre was being searched for by police as the area was in a state of emergency for several weeks. It was rumored that Giuliano threatened to line the race route in the mountains and shoot at the participants with machine guns if the police did not call off their search for him. Specifically Giuliano threatened to interrupt the first stage along its route from Palermo to Catania. Due to these threats, there were discussions to cancel the two planned stages in Sicily, but the stages remained. Instead, the normal police escort for the Giro d'Italia caravan that travels with the race would be increased from 6 to 10 cars and cars would not be allowed to stop along the route throughout the two stages on the island except in cases of "force majeure." The added police were not due to the rumors of the attack, but allegedly to prevent a potential escape by Giuliano.

Stage characteristics and results
Stage	Date	Course	Distance	Type	Winner
1	21 May	Palermo to Catania	261 km (162 mi)	Stage with mountain(s)	Mario Fazio (ITA)
2	22 May	Catania to Messina	163 km (101 mi)	Plain stage	Sergio Maggini (ITA)
3	23 May	Villa San Giovanni to Cosenza	214 km (133 mi)	Stage with mountain(s)	Guido De Santi (ITA)
4	24 May	Cosenza to Salerno	292 km (181 mi)	Plain stage	Fausto Coppi (ITA)
5	26 May	Salerno to Naples	161 km (100 mi)	Plain stage	Serafino Biagioni (ITA)
6	27 May	Naples to Rome	233 km (145 mi)	Plain stage	Mario Ricci (ITA)
7	28 May	Rome to Pesaro	298 km (185 mi)	Plain stage	Adolfo Leoni (ITA)
8	29 May	Pesaro to Venezia	273 km (170 mi)	Plain stage	Luigi Casola (ITA)
9	31 May	Venezia to Udine	249 km (155 mi)	Plain stage	Adolfo Leoni (ITA)
10	1 June	Udine to Bassano del Grappa	154 km (96 mi)	Plain stage	Giovanni Corrieri (ITA)
11	2 June	Bassano del Grappa to Bolzano	237 km (147 mi)	Stage with mountain(s)	Fausto Coppi (ITA)
12	4 June	Bolzano to Modena	253 km (157 mi)	Plain stage	Oreste Conte (ITA)
13	5 June	Modena to Montecatini Terme	160 km (99 mi)	Stage with mountain(s)	Adolfo Leoni (ITA)
14	6 June	Montecatini Terme to Genoa	228 km (142 mi)	Stage with mountain(s)	Vincenzo Rossello (ITA)
15	7 June	Genoa to Sanremo	136 km (85 mi)	Plain stage	Luciano Maggini (ITA)
16	9 June	Sanremo to Cuneo	190 km (118 mi)	Stage with mountain(s)	Oreste Conte (ITA)
17	10 June	Cuneo to Pinerolo	254 km (158 mi)	Stage with mountain(s)	Fausto Coppi (ITA)
18	11 June	Pinerolo to Turin	65 km (40 mi)	Individual time trial	Antonio Bevilacqua (ITA)
19	12 June	Turin to Monza	267 km (166 mi)	Stage with mountain(s)	Giovanni Corrieri (ITA)
	Total		4,088 km (2,540 mi)		

== Classification leadership ==
In the 1949 Giro d'Italia there were two major classifications. For the general classification, calculated by adding each cyclist's finishing times on each stage, and allowing time bonuses for the first three finishers on mass-start stages, the leader received a pink jersey. This classification was considered the most important of the Giro d'Italia, and the winner was considered the winner of the Giro.

In the mountains classifications, points were won by the first five cyclists reaching the top of a climb. This classification did not award a jersey to the leader. The highest climb of the race was the Col d'Izoard in stage seventeen, which was 2360m. The other stages that included categorized climbs were stages: 1, 3, 11, 13, 14, 15, 17, and 19.

A white jersey was awarded to the highest ranked independent rider, who was typically from a non-major team."

There was a black jersey (maglia nera) awarded to the rider placed last in the general classification. The classification was calculated in the same manner as the general classification.

There was a classification for sprints called the "Gran Premio Tappe Volanti" classification. This consisted of a sprint line that was marked in eight stages of the race, stages 2, 4, 7, 8, 9, 12, 14, and 19. Specifically the eight sprints were located in the following places Taormina, Castrovillari, Terni, Ferrara, Trieste, Verona, Chiavari, and Novara, respectively.

For placing in the top three for each classification, on the final stage placings, the "Gran Premio Tappe Volanti", or crossing a categorized climb for the mountains classification, time bonuses were awarded. One minute time bonus was given to the first placed rider, thirty seconds to second place, and fifteen second to third.

Classification leadership by stage
Stage	Winner	General classification	Best independent rider	Mountains classification	Intermediate sprints classification	Last in General classification	Team classification
1	Mario Fazio	Mario Fazio	Mario Fazio	Mario Fazio	not awarded	?	Wilier Triestina
2	Sergio Maggini	Giordano Cottur	Andrea Carrea	Mario Fazio	Luigi Casola	Sante Carollo	Wilier Triestina
3	Guido De Santi	Giordano Cottur	Andrea Carrea	Mario Fazio & Léon Jomaux	Luigi Casola	Sante Carollo	Wilier Triestina
4	Fausto Coppi	Giordano Cottur	Mario Fazio	Mario Fazio & Léon Jomaux	Luigi Casola	Vitaliano Lazzerini	Wilier Triestina
5	Serafino Biagioni	Giordano Cottur	Mario Fazio	Mario Fazio & Léon Jomaux	Luigi Casola	Vitaliano Lazzerini	Wilier Triestina
6	Mario Ricci	Giordano Cottur	Mario Fazio	Mario Fazio & Léon Jomaux	Luigi Casola	Vitaliano Lazzerini	Wilier Triestina
7	Adolfo Leoni	Mario Fazio	Mario Fazio	Mario Fazio & Léon Jomaux	Luigi Casola	Vitaliano Lazzerini	Wilier Triestina
8	Luigi Casola	Mario Fazio	Mario Fazio	Mario Fazio & Léon Jomaux	Luigi Casola	Marcel Buysse	Wilier Triestina
9	Adolfo Leoni	Adolfo Leoni	Mario Fazio	Mario Fazio & Léon Jomaux	Luigi Casola	Sante Carollo	Wilier Triestina
10	Giovanni Corrieri	Adolfo Leoni	Mario Fazio	Mario Fazio & Léon Jomaux	Luigi Casola	Marcel Buysse	Wilier Triestina
11	Fausto Coppi	Adolfo Leoni	Giancarlo Astrua	Fausto Coppi	Adolfo Leoni	Sante Carollo	Wilier Triestina
12	Oreste Conte	Adolfo Leoni	Giancarlo Astrua	Fausto Coppi	Adolfo Leoni	Sante Carollo	Wilier Triestina
13	Adolfo Leoni	Adolfo Leoni	Giancarlo Astrua	Fausto Coppi	Adolfo Leoni	Sante Carollo	Wilier Triestina
14	Vincenzo Rossello	Adolfo Leoni	Giancarlo Astrua	Fausto Coppi	Oreste Conte	Sante Carollo	Wilier Triestina
15	Luciano Maggini	Adolfo Leoni	Giancarlo Astrua	Fausto Coppi	Oreste Conte	Sante Carollo	Wilier Triestina
16	Oreste Conte	Adolfo Leoni	Giancarlo Astrua	Fausto Coppi	Oreste Conte	Sante Carollo	Wilier Triestina
17	Fausto Coppi	Fausto Coppi	Giancarlo Astrua	Fausto Coppi	Oreste Conte	Sante Carollo	Wilier Triestina
18	Antonio Bevilacqua	Fausto Coppi	Giancarlo Astrua	Fausto Coppi	Oreste Conte	Sante Carollo	Wilier Triestina
19	Giovanni Corrieri	Fausto Coppi	Giancarlo Astrua	Fausto Coppi	Oreste Conte	Sante Carollo	Wilier Triestina
Final		Fausto Coppi	Giancarlo Astrua	Fausto Coppi	Oreste Conte	Sante Carollo	Wilier Triestina

== Final standings ==
Legend
A pink jersey	Denotes the winner of the General classification
A white jersey	Denotes the best independent rider

=== General classification ===
Final general classification (1–10)
Rank	Rider	Team	Time
1	Fausto Coppi (ITA)	Bianchi	125h 25' 50"
2	Gino Bartali (ITA)	Bartali	+ 23' 47"
3	Giordano Cottur (ITA)	Wilier-Triestina	+ 38' 27"
4	Adolfo Leoni (ITA)	Legnano	+ 39' 01"
5	Giancarlo Astrua (ITA)	Benotto	+ 39' 50"
6	Alfredo Martini (ITA)	Wilier-Triestina	+ 48' 48"
7	Giulio Bresci (ITA)	Centro Sportivo Italiano	+ 49' 14"
8	Serafino Biagioni (ITA)	Viscontea	+ 53' 14"
9	Nedo Logli (ITA)	Arbos	+ 56' 59"
10	Silvio Pedroni (ITA)	Fréjus	+ 1h 02' 10"

=== Independent rider classification ===
Final independent rider classification (1–5)
Rank	Rider	Team	Time
1	Giancarlo Astrua (ITA)	Benotto	126h 05' 40"
2	Serafino Biagioni (ITA)	Viscontea	+ 13' 24"
3	Silvio Pedroni (ITA)	Fréjus	+ 22' 20"
4	Mario Fazio (ITA)	Bottecchia	+ 26' 20"
5	Settimo Simonini (ITA)	Fréjus	+ 34' 23"

=== Mountains classification ===
Final mountains classification (1–5)
Rank	Rider	Team	Points
1	Fausto Coppi (ITA)	Bianchi	46
2	Gino Bartali (ITA)	Bartali	41
3	Alfredo Pasotti (ITA)	Benotto	23
4	Giancarlo Astrua (ITA)	Benotto	14
5	Léon Jomaux (FRA)	Bartali	12

=== Team classification ===
Final team classification (1–10)
Rank	Team	Time
1	Wilier-Triestina	378h 33' 59"
2	Bianchi	+50' 00"
3	Legnano	+1h 09' 28"
4	Fréjus	+1h 17' 48"
5	Bartali	+1h 22' 51"
6	Benotto	+1h 49' 00"
7	Arbos	+3h 38' 45"
8	Cimatti	+3h 49' 47"
9	Atala	+4h 23' 14"
10	Bottecchia	+4h 28' 50"

=== Intermediate sprints classification ===
Final intermediate sprints classification (1–3)
Rank	Name	Team	Points
1	Oreste Conte (ITA)	Bianchi	21
2	Antonio Bevilacqua (ITA)	Atala	19
3	Adolfo Leoni (ITA)	Legnano	13
