= 1946 Giro d'Italia =

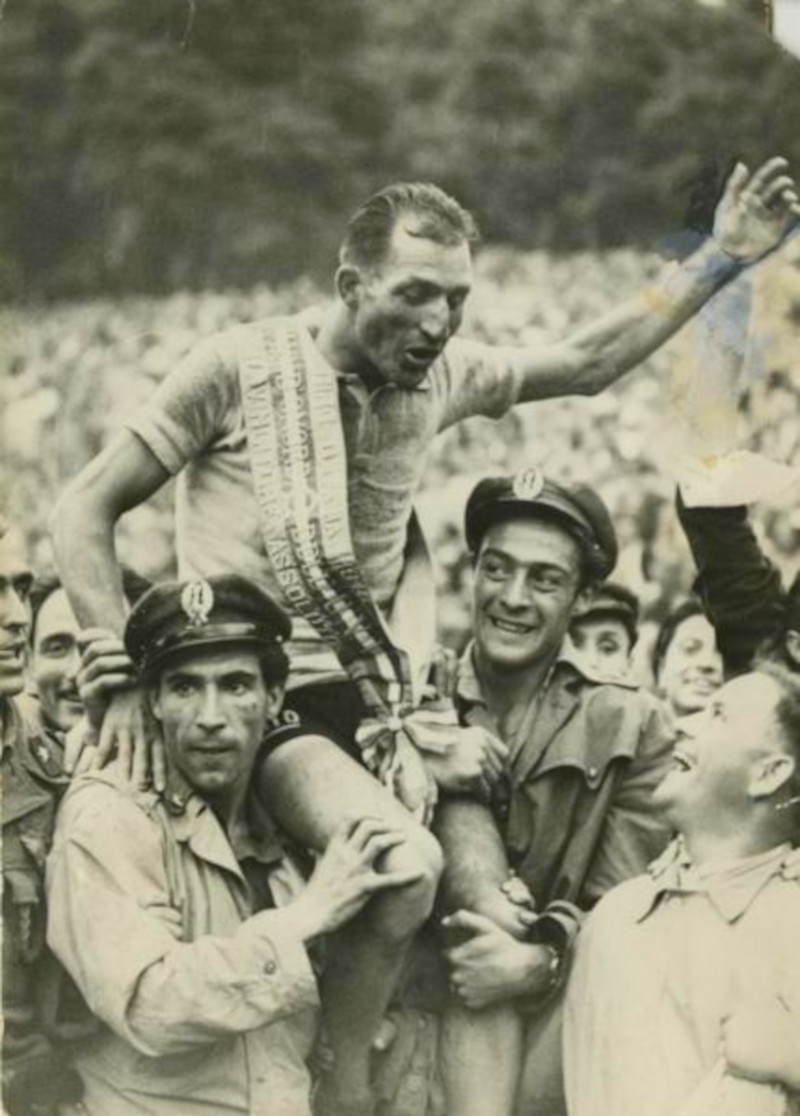
- Gino Bartali, winner, brought in triumph to Milan

Race details
- Dates: 15 June - 7 July 1946
- Stages: 16, including three split stages
- Distance: 3,039.5 km (1,889 mi)
- Winning time: 95h 32' 20"

Results
Jersey awarded to the overall winner	Winner	Gino Bartali (ITA)	(Legnano)
	Second	Fausto Coppi (ITA)	(Bianchi)
	Third	Vito Ortelli (ITA)	(Benotto)
	Mountains	Gino Bartali (ITA)	(Legnano)
	Team	Benotto	

The 1946 Giro d'Italia was the 29th edition of the Giro d'Italia, organized and sponsored by the newspaper La Gazzetta dello Sport. The race began on 15 June in Milan with a stage that stretched 185 km (115 mi) to Turin, finishing back in Milan on 7 July after a 176 km (109 mi) stage and a total distance covered of 3,039.5 km (1,889 mi).

The race was won by Gino Bartali of the Legnano team, with fellow Italians Fausto Coppi and Vito Ortelli coming in second and third respectively.

== Participants ==
The 1946 Giro d'Italia was contested by seven teams and six groups. Each team consisted of seven riders, while each group was made up of four cyclists. This made the starting peloton total 79 riders. Nearly half of the riders were starting their first edition of the Giro. Of the riders that began the race, only 40 were able to complete the race. Joseph Magnani became the first American, and by the virtue North American, to compete in the Giro. The peloton was entirely Italian as Italy was technically still at war with most other countries.

After having ridden together on Legnano at the last Giro and until World War II halted professional cycling in Italy, Fausto Coppi (Bianchi) and Gino Bartali (Legnano) entered the Giro now on different teams. Coppi started the season in great form and won the Milan–San Remo by over fourteen minutes after riding nearly the whole race alone. Tensions between the two riders elevated after May's Züri-Metzgete, where Bartali asked Coppi to help him to the finish and, if so, he would not contest the race to the line. Coppi agreed, but Bartali attacked as Coppi adjusted his toe straps and won the race, angering Coppi. Together, they were seen as favorites to win the race. Mario Ricci, Adolfo Leoni, Aldo Bini, and Glauco Servadei also received consideration as riders to win the opening stage. Vito Ortelli was another other main contenders for the race win. In interview with the Unione Velocipedistica Italiana president Borroni, Bartali stated that he only wanted to ride the Giro in order to get granted permission to ride the Tour de Suisse. Fermo Camellini and Oreste Conte received attention as threats to win the race. A notable exclusion was Fiorenzo Magni who was not allowed to participate due to a suspension by the UVI. (Note: The exact reason for Magni's suspension is unknown, but thought to be either due to his allegiance to the Italian Fascists, while others believe he had been caught riding under another name.)

The squads entering the race were:

Trade teams

- Benotto
- Bianchi
- Legnano
- Olmo
- Viscontea
- Welter
- Wilier Triestina

Groups

- Milan-Gazzetta
- V. C. Bustese
- Fronte Della Gioventu'-Duluz
- Enal-Campari
- Azzini-Freni Universal
- Centro Sportivo Italiano

== Route and stages ==
The Italian Cycling Federation announced on 7 December 1945 that several of bike races would be return the following season including the likes of the Giro, Giro di Lombardia, Milan–San Remo, and more. The significance of the restart was noted by a l'Unità writer who wrote: "... this Giro makes the idea of unity of our nation concrete..." The paper even took to referring it as the Giro della Rinascita (English: Tour of Rebirth). Cities in Italy submitted requests to be hosts for the stages of the Giro by 28 January 1946. As planning started, there were problems that arose: as the bombing from the war had destroyed bridges and roads significantly. The damages to the railroad system and the southern roads in particular, limited the Giro to the land north of Naples. A main concern of race organizers was the date of the Italian elections, which was announced to be on 2 June by the Council of Ministers. To avoid overlapping with the election, on 13 March the event was announced, and that it would start on 15 June and end on 7 July. The route was fully revealed on 11 April. The route was viewed to be largely symbolic in nature as it visited sites that were related to events from the First and Second World Wars like Trento, Bassano del Grappa, and Piave. Pope Pius XII wrote to La Gazzetta dello Sport and mentioned he would offer an audience if the race were to pass through Rome, which the organizers obliged and the riders had the opportunity to meet the Pope.

The day before the race started, organizers announced the stage from Rovigo to the Allied controlled Trieste could not finish in Trieste and its finish would be moved to Vittorio Veneto. Trieste was then under British and American control as Italy and Yugoslavia disputed the land. This decision caused controversy both within Trieste and across Italy and the government soon began to negotiate for a finish in Trieste. After the race had started, on 22 June, the Allied Military Command announced that the originally planned finish in Trieste would be allowed.

Stage characteristics and results
Stage	Date	Course	Distance	Type	Winner
1	15 June	Milan to Turin	185 km (115 mi)	Plain stage	Giordano Cottur (ITA)
2	16 June	Turin to Genoa	190 km (118 mi)	Plain stage	Antonio Bevilacqua (ITA)
3	17 June	Genoa to Montecatini Terme	222 km (138 mi)	Stage with mountain(s)	Adolfo Leoni (ITA)
	18 June	Rest day			
4a	19 June	Montecatini Terme to Prato	30 km (19 mi)	Individual time trial	Antonio Bevilacqua (ITA)
4b	19 June	Prato to Bologna	112 km (70 mi)	Stage with mountain(s)	Fausto Coppi (ITA)
5a	20 June	Bologna to Cesena	80 km (50 mi)	Plain stage	Olimpio Bizzi (ITA)
5b	20 June	Cesena to Ancona	128 km (80 mi)	Plain stage	Aldo Bini (ITA)
	21 June	Rest day			
6	22 June	Ancona to Chieti	170 km (106 mi)	Plain stage	Vito Ortelli (ITA)
7	23 June	Chieti to Naples	244 km (152 mi)	Stage with mountain(s)	Mario Ricci (ITA)
	24 June	Rest day			
8	25 June	Naples to Rome	226 km (140 mi)	Plain stage	Elio Bertocchi (ITA)
9	26 June	Rome to Perugia	191 km (119 mi)	Plain stage	Aldo Baito (ITA)
10	27 June	Perugia to Florence	165 km (103 mi)	Plain stage	Renzo Zanazzi (ITA)
	28 June	Rest day			
11	29 June	Florence to Rovigo	245 km (152 mi)	Plain stage	Oreste Conte (ITA)
12	30 June	Rovigo to Trieste	132 km (82 mi)	Plain stage	Stage Cancelled
	1 July	Rest day			
13	2 July	Udine to Auronzo di Cadore	124.5 km (77 mi)	Stage with mountain(s)	Fausto Coppi (ITA)
14	3 July	Auronzo di Cadore to Bassano del Grappa	203 km (126 mi)	Stage with mountain(s)	Fausto Coppi (ITA)
	4 July	Rest day			
15	5 July	Bassano del Grappa to Trento	186 km (116 mi)	Stage with mountain(s)	Aldo Ronconi (ITA)
16a	6 July	Trento to Verona	90 km (56 mi)	Plain stage	Oreste Conte (ITA)
16b	6 July	Verona to Mantua	72 km (45 mi)	Plain stage	Elio Bertocchi (ITA)
17	7 July	Mantua to Milan	176 km (109 mi)	Plain stage	Oreste Conte (ITA)
	Total		3,039.5 km (1,889 mi)		

== Race overview ==
The twelfth leg of the race started at 6:25 am local time. British radio (A.I.S.) stated that a large trunk was placed on the road two kilometers after Pieris, on the border of Venezia Giulia. Stones were thrown at the riders and the local police followed the race and dispersed the crowds. Shots were fired and the police responded, which led to people hiding in the bushes shooting upon the police and them retaliating until the crowd and the shooters dispersed. The cyclists met to determine if they would still ride, some rode to Udine, while others rode to Miramare reached the Montebello race course by bicycle. The race jury released a statement stated that an unexpected event happened where stones were thrown at riders, along with nails and other obstacles being placed in the road. The same time was awarded to all the riders. After a long pause in action, the riders continued to race to Trieste's finish, in the Montebello hippodrome for the stage victory. The start of the stage from Udine to Auronzo was moved to Tuesday. Trieste's Giro d'Italia committee announced that no riders had been seriously injured. Marangonni and Pasquini had abrasions and could continue racing.

== Classification leadership ==
The leader of the general classification – calculated by adding the stage finish times of each rider – wore a pink jersey. This classification is the most important of the race, and its winner is considered as the winner of the Giro. There were no time bonuses in 1946. A similar classification to the general classification was the "aggruppati" classification which was calculated in the same fashion as the general classification, but it was excluse to the riders competing from groups rather than teams, and its leader wore a white jersey.

In the mountains classification, the race organizers selected different mountains that the route crossed and awarded points to the five riders who crossed them first.

The winner of the team classification was determined by adding the finish times of the best three cyclists per team together and the team with the lowest total time was the winner. If a team had fewer than three riders finish, they were not eligible for the classification. The group classification was decided in the same manner, but the classification was exclusive to the competing groups.

There was a black jersey (maglia nera) awarded to the rider placed last in the general classification. The classification was calculated in the same manner as the general classification.

The rows in the following table correspond to the jerseys awarded after that stage was run.

Classification leadership
Stage	Winner	General classification	Best Group rider classification	Mountains classification	Last in General classification	Team classification	Group classification
1	Giordano Cottur	Giordano Cottur	Enzo Coppini	not awarded	Mario Spinazzi	Wilier-Triestina	multiple shared
2	Antonio Bevilacqua	Antonio Bevilacqua	Egidio Marangoni	not awarded	Elio Bertocchi	Wilier-Triestina	Milan-Gazzetta
3	Adolfo Leoni	Antonio Bevilacqua	Egidio Marangoni	Serse Coppi	Elio Bertocchi	Wilier-Triestina	Enal Campari
4a	Antonio Bevilacqu	Antonio Bevilacqua	Egidio Marangoni	Serse Coppi	?	Wilier-Triestina	Enal Campari
4b	Fausto Coppi	Fermo Camellini	Salvatore Crippa	Gino Bartali	?	Wilier-Triestina	Enal Campari
5a	Olimpio Bizzi	Fermo Camellini	Salvatore Crippa	Gino Bartali	?	Legnano	Enal Campari
5b	Aldo Bini	Fermo Camellini	Salvatore Crippa	Gino Bartali	Severino Canavesi	Legnano	Enal Campari
6	Vito Ortelli	Fermo Camellini	Salvatore Crippa	Gino Bartali	Severino Canavesi	Legnano	Enal Campari
7	Mario Ricci	Vito Ortelli	Salvatore Crippa	Gino Bartali	Severino Canavesi	Legnano	Enal Campari
8	Elio Bertocchi	Vito Ortelli	Salvatore Crippa	Gino Bartali	Enea Antolini	Legnano	Enal Campari
9	Aldo Baito	Vito Ortelli	Salvatore Crippa	Gino Bartali	Antonio Giauna	Legnano	Enal Campari
10	Renzo Zanazzi	Vito Ortelli	Salvatore Crippa	Gino Bartali	Leopoldo Ricci	Legnano	Enal Campari
11	Oreste Conte	Vito Ortelli	Salvatore Crippa	Gino Bartali	Luigi Malabrocca	Wilier-Triestina	Enal Campari
12	Stage Cancelled	Vito Ortelli	Salvatore Crippa	Gino Bartali	Luigi Malabrocca	Wilier-Triestina	Enal Campari
13	Fausto Coppi	Gino Bartali	Salvatore Crippa	Gino Bartali	Luigi Malabrocca	Benotto	Enal Campari
14	Fausto Coppi	Gino Bartali	Salvatore Crippa	Gino Bartali	Luigi Malabrocca	Bianchi	Fronte Della Gioventu Dulux
15	Aldo Ronconi	Gino Bartali	Salvatore Crippa	Gino Bartali	Luigi Malabrocca	Benotto	Fronte Della Gioventu Dulux
16a	Oreste Conte	Gino Bartali	Salvatore Crippa	Gino Bartali	Luigi Malabrocca	Benotto	Fronte Della Gioventu Dulux
16b	Elio Bertocchi	Gino Bartali	Salvatore Crippa	Gino Bartali	Luigi Malabrocca	Benotto	Fronte Della Gioventu Dulux
17	Oreste Conte	Gino Bartali	Salvatore Crippa	Gino Bartali	Luigi Malabrocca	Benotto	Fronte Della Gioventu Dulux
Final		Gino Bartali	Salvatore Crippa	Gino Bartali	Luigi Malabrocca	Benotto	Fronte Della Gioventu Dulux

== Final standings ==
Legend
A pink jersey	Denotes the winner of the General classification
White jersey	Denotes the best grouped rider

=== General classification ===
Final general classification (1–10)
Rank	Name	Team	Time
1	Gino Bartali (ITA)	Legnano	95h 32' 20"
2	Fausto Coppi (ITA)	Bianchi	+ 47"
3	Vito Ortelli (ITA)	Benotto	+ 15' 28"
4	Salvatore Crippa (ITA)	ENAL-Campari	+ 15' 31"
5	Aldo Ronconi (ITA)	Benotto	+ 24' 31"
6	Giulio Bresci (ITA)	Welter	+ 27' 35"
7	Ezio Cecchi (ITA)	Centro Sportivo Italiano	+ 37' 58"
8	Giordano Cottur (ITA)	Wilier Triestina	+ 38' 28"
9	Alfredo Martini (ITA)	Welter	+ 39' 54"
10	Primo Volpi (ITA)	Velo Club Bustese	+ 43' 12"

=== Mountains classification ===
Final mountains classification (1–6)
Rank	Name	Team	Points
1	Gino Bartali (ITA)	Legnano	27
2	Fausto Coppi (ITA)	Bianchi	20
3	Vito Ortelli (ITA)	Benotto	17
4	Aldo Ronconi (ITA)	Benotto	8
5	Serse Coppi (ITA)	Bianchi	5
5	Ezio Cecchi (ITA)	Centro Sportivo Italiano	5
6	Giordano Cottur (ITA)	Wilier Triestina	4

=== Group rider classification ===
Final Group rider classification (1–10)
Rank	Name	Team	Time
1	Salvatore Crippa (ITA)	ENAL–Campari	95h 47' 51"
2	Ezio Cecchi (ITA)	Centro Sportivo Italiano	+ 22' 27"
3	Primo Volpi (ITA)	V. C. Bustese	+ 27' 42"
4	Aldo Baito (ITA)	V. C. Bustese	+ 28' 44"
5	Serafino Biagioni (ITA)	Fronte Della Gioventu'-Duluz	+ 31' 25"
6	Bruno Pasquini (ITA)	Milan-Gazzetta	+ 35' 46"
7	Enzo Coppini (ITA)	Fronte Della Gioventu'-Duluz	+ 43' 20"
8	Diego Marabelli (ITA)	ENAL–Campari	+ 46' 31"
9	Augusto Introzzi (ITA)	Azzini-Freni Universal	+ 1h 2' 32"
10	Andrea Giacometti (ITA)	Fronte Della Gioventu'-Duluz	+ 1h 14' 47"

=== Team classification ===
Final team classification (1-5)
	Team	Time
1	Benotto	288h 55' 43"
2	Welter	+ 33' 05"
3	Bianchi	+ 33' 07"
4	Wilier-Triestina	+ 58' 24"
5	Legnano	+ 1h 15' 36"

=== Group classification ===
Final group classification (1-4)
	Team	Time
1	Fronte Della Gioventu Dulux	289h 53' 05"
2	Velo Club Bustese	+ 3' 54"
3	Enal Campari	+ 24' 00"
4	Milan-Gazzetta	+ 3h 34' 21"

== Aftermath ==
Bartali after the victory, stated "I had become Ginettaccio, but 'Giant of the Mountain' was a nickname no one would yet take away."
