= 1947 Giro di Lombardia =

Race details
- Dates: 26 October 1947
- Stages: 1
- Distance: 222 km (137.9 mi)

Results
	Winner	Fausto Coppi (ITA)
	Second	Gino Bartali (ITA)
	Third	Italo De Zan (ITA)

The 1947 Giro di Lombardia, 41st edition of the race, was held on 26 October 1947 on a total route of 222 km. It was won for the second consecutive time by the Italian Fausto Coppi, reached the finish line with the time of Stackthank ' 00 "at an average of 35.520 km/h, preceding the countrymen Gino Bartali and Italo De Zan.

129 cyclists took off from Milan and 53 of them completed the race.

== General classification ==
Final general classification

Rank	Rider	Team	Time
1	Fausto Coppi (ITA)	Bianchi	
2	Gino Bartali (ITA)	Legnano	
3	Italo De Zan (ITA)	Lygie	
4	Sergio Pagliazzi (ITA)	Ricci	
5	Louis Thiétard (FRA)	Metropole–Dunlop	
6	Adolfo Leoni (ITA)	Bianchi	
7	Brik Schotte (BEL)	Alcyon–Dunlop	
8	Mario Ricci (ITA)	Legnano	
9	Egidio Marangoni (ITA)	Wally	
10	Fermo Camellini (ITA)	Olmo	
