= 1948 Giro di Lombardia =

Race details
- Dates: 24 October 1948
- Stages: 1
- Distance: 222 km (137.9 mi)

Results
| | Winner | Fausto Coppi (ITA) |
| | Second | Adolfo Leoni (ITA) |
| | Third | Fritz Schär (SUI) |

The 1948 Giro di Lombardia, 42nd edition of the race, was held on 24 October 1948 on a total route of 222 km (137.9 mi). It was won for the third consecutive time by Italian Fausto Coppi, who reached the finish line with the time of 5h51 ' 55 "at an average of 37.849 km/h, preceding Adolfo Leoni and Fritz Schär.

127 cyclists took off from Milan and 74 of them completed the race.

== General classification ==
=== Final general classification ===
| Rank | Rider | Team | Time |
|---|---|---|---|
| 1 | Fausto Coppi (ITA) | Bianchi | 5h51 ' 55 " |
| 2 | Adolfo Leoni (ITA) | Legnano | |
| 3 | Fritz Schär (SUI) | Mondia | |
| 4 | Alfredo Martini (ITA) | Tebag | |
| 5 | Vito Ortelli (ITA) | Olympia–Dunlop | |
| 6 | Antonin Rolland (FRA) | Rhonson–Dunlop | |
| 7 | Pino Cerami (ITA) | Bèlgica | |
| 8 | Giancarlo Astrua (ITA) | Benotto | |
| 9 | Pietro Giudici (ITA) | Crennense SC | |
| 10 | Settimio Simonini (ITA) | Viani Cral Imperia | |
