= 1945 Giro di Lombardia =

Race details
- Dates: 1945
- Stages: 1

Results
	Winner	Mario Ricci (ITA)
	Second	Aldo Bini (ITA)
	Third	Gino Bartali (ITA)

== General classification ==
Final general classification

Rank	Rider	Team	Time
1	Mario Ricci (ITA)	Legnano	
2	Aldo Bini (ITA)	Pratese VC	
3	Gino Bartali (ITA)	Legnano	
4	Adolfo Leoni (ITA)	Bianchi	
5	Aldo Baito (ITA)		
6	Ubaldo Pugnaloni (ITA)	Bianchi	
7	Salvatore Crippa (ITA)	Ricci	
8	Severino Canavesi (ITA)	US Legnanese	
9	Quirino Toccacelli (ITA)	Olmo	
10	Oreste Conte (ITA)	Ricci	
