= 1941 Milan–San Remo =

Race details
- Dates: 19 March 1941
- Stages: 1
- Distance: 281.5 km (174.9 mi)
- Winning time: 7h 46' 25"

Results
	Winner	Pierino Favalli (ITA)	(Legnano)
	Second	Mario Ricci (ITA)	(Legnano)
	Third	Pietro Chiappini (ITA)	(Olympia)

The 1941 Milan–San Remo was the 34th edition of the Milan–San Remo cycle race and was held on 19 March 1938. The race started in Milan and finished in San Remo. The race was won by Pierino Favalli of the Legnano team.

== General classification ==
Final general classification

Rank	Rider	Team	Time
1	Pierino Favalli (ITA)	Legnano	7h 46' 25"
2	Mario Ricci (ITA)	Legnano	+ 1' 39"
3	Pietro Chiappini (ITA)	Olympia	+ 5' 37"
4	Fiorenzo Magni (ITA)	Bianchi	s.t.
5	Mario De Benedetti (ITA)	Legnano	s.t.
6	Giordano Cottur (ITA)	Viscontea	s.t.
7	Domenico Pedevilla (ITA)	Olmo	s.t.
8	Giuseppe Magni (ITA)	Vismara DA	+ 8' 25"
9	Enrico Mollo (ITA)	Olympia	+ 8' 29"
10	Fausto Coppi (ITA)	Legnano	+ 11' 07"
