= 1953 UCI Road World Championships – Men's road race =

Men's Individual Road Race
1953 UCI Road World Championships
- Rainbow jersey

Race details
- Dates: 30 August 1953
- Stages: 1
- Distance: 270 km (167.8 mi)
- Winning time: 7h 30' 59"

Results
	Winner	Fausto Coppi (ITA)	(Italy)
	Second	Germain Derycke (BEL)	(Belgium)
	Third	Stan Ockers (BEL)	(Belgium)

The men's road race at the 1953 UCI Road World Championships was the 20th edition of the event. The race took place on Sunday 30 August 1953 in Lugano, Switzerland. The race was won by Fausto Coppi of Italy.

== Final classification ==
General classification (1–10)

Rank	Rider	Time
1st place, gold medalist(s)	Fausto Coppi (ITA)	7h 30' 59"
2nd place, silver medalist(s)	Germain Derycke (BEL)	+ 6' 22"
3rd place, bronze medalist(s)	Stan Ockers (BEL)	+ 7' 33"
4	Michele Gismondi (ITA)	+ 7' 34"
5	Nino Defilippis (ITA)	+ 9' 11"
6	Charly Gaul (LUX)	+ 9' 12"
7	Ferdinand Kübler (SUI)	+ 12' 57"
8	Louison Bobet (FRA)	+ 12' 57"
9	Raphaël Géminiani (FRA)	+ 12' 57"
10	Marcel Ernzer (LUX)	+ 12' 57"
