= 1946 Milan–San Remo =

Race details
- Dates: 19 March 1946
- Stages: 1
- Distance: 293 km (182 mi)
- Winning time: 8h 09' 00"

Results
	Winner	Fausto Coppi (ITA)	(Bianchi)
	Second	Lucien Teisseire (FRA)	(Ray–Dunlop)
	Third	Mario Ricci (ITA)	(Legnano–Pirelli)

The 1946 Milan–San Remo was the 37th edition of the Milan–San Remo cycle race and was held on 19 March 1946. The race started in Milan and finished in San Remo. The race was won by Fausto Coppi of the Bianchi team. He attacked with nine others, five kilometres into a race of 292 km. He dropped the rest on the Turchino climb and won by 14 minutes.

== General classification ==
Final general classification

Rank	Rider	Team	Time
1	Fausto Coppi (ITA)	Bianchi	8h 09' 00"
2	Lucien Teisseire (FRA)	Ray–Dunlop	+ 14' 00"
3	Mario Ricci (ITA)	Legnano–Pirelli	+ 18' 30"
4	Gino Bartali (ITA)	Legnano–Pirelli	+ 18' 30"
5	Severino Canavesi (ITA)	Bianchi	+ 18' 30"
6	Vito Ortelli (ITA)	Benotto–Superga	+ 18' 30"
7	Adolfo Leoni (ITA)	Bianchi	+ 18' 30"
=8	Osvaldo Bailo (ITA)	Gestri	+ 18' 30"
=8	Salvatore Crippa (ITA)	Enal–Campari	+ 18' 30"
=8	Emilio Croci Torti (SUI)	Olmo–Fulgor	+ 18' 30"
