= 1950 Giro di Lombardia =

Race details
- Dates: 22 October 1950
- Stages: 1
- Distance: 222 km (137.9 mi)

Results
	Winner	Renzo Soldani (ITA)
	Second	Antonio Bevilacqua (ITA)
	Third	Fausto Coppi (ITA)

The 1950 Giro di Lombardia, 44th edition of the race, was held on 22 October 1950.

== General classification ==
=== Final general classification ===
Rank	Rider	Team	Time
1	Renzo Soldani (ITA)		
2	Antonio Bevilacqua (ITA)	Wilier-Triestina	
3	Fausto Coppi (ITA)	Bianchi-Ursus	
4	Donato Zampini (ITA)	Ganna	
5	Ferdi Kübler (SUI)	Tebag	
6	Oreste Conte (ITA)	Bianchi-Ursus	
7	Alfo Ferrari (ITA)	Frejus	
8	Giuseppe Minardi (ITA)	Legnano	
9	Virgilio Salimbeni (ITA)	Legnano	
10	Angelo Conterno (ITA)	G. S. Covolo	
