= 1946 Giro di Lombardia =

Race details
- Dates: 27 October 1946
- Stages: 1
- Distance: 231 km (143.5 mi)

Results
	Winner	Fausto Coppi (ITA)
	Second	Luigi Casola (ITA)
	Third	Michele Motta (ITA)

The 1946 Giro di Lombardia, the 40th edition of the race, was held on 27 October 1946 on a total route of 231 km. It was won for the first time, of the 4 consecutive, by Italian Fausto Coppi, reached the finish line with the time of 6h24 ' 30 "at an average of 36.047 km/h, preceding the compatriots Luigi Casola and Michele Motta.

129 cyclists took off from Milan and 53 of them completed the race.

== General classification ==
Final general classification

Rank	Rider	Team	Time
1	Fausto Coppi (ITA)	Bianchi	6h24 ' 30 "
2	Luigi Casola (ITA)	Bustese VC	
3	Michele Motta (ITA)	Welter	
4	Italo De Zan (ITA)	Olmo	
5	Bruno Pasquini (ITA)	Milan Gazetta	
6	Osvaldo Bailo (ITA)	Gestri	
7	Ello Bertocchi (ITA)	Viscontea	
8	Antonio Covolo (ITA)	Benotto	
9	Ubaldo Pugnaloni (ITA)	Milan Gazetta	
10	Severino Canavesi (ITA)	Bianchi	
