= Antonio Bevilacqua =

Italian cyclist

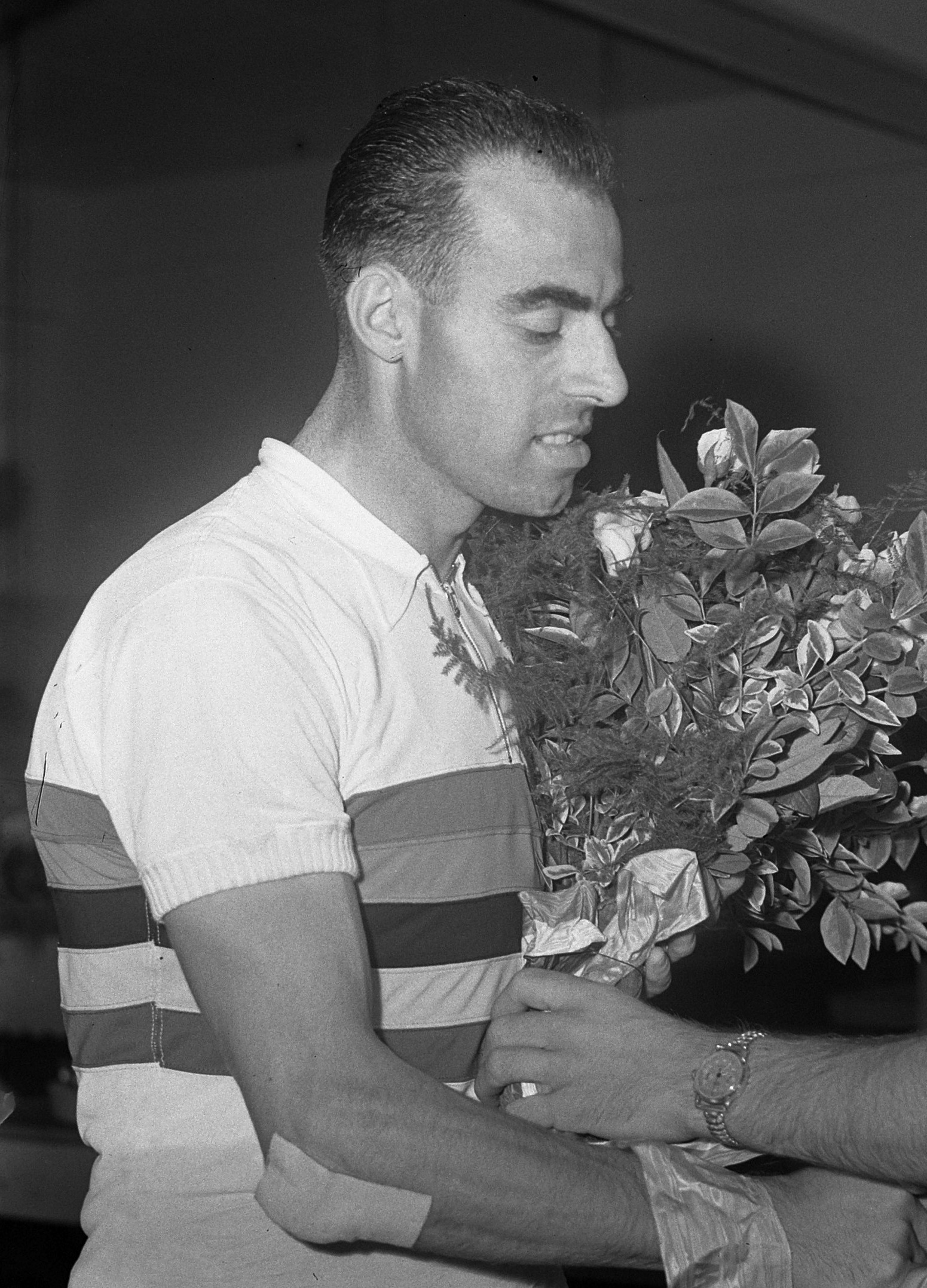
- Bevilacqua in 1950

Personal information
- Full name: Antonio Bevilacqua
- Born: 22 October 1918 Santa Maria di Sala, Italy
- Died: 29 March 1972 (aged 53) Mestre, Italy

Cycling career
- Sport: Cycling
- Disciplines: Road and track
- Role: Rider
- Rider type: Pursuit
Medal record
Representing Italy
Men's road bicycle racing
World Championships
Bronze medal – third place	1951 Varese	Elite Men's Road Race
Men's track cycling
World Championships
Gold medal – first place	1950 Rocourt	4km Individual Pursuit
Gold medal – first place	1951 Milano	4km Individual Pursuit
Silver medal – second place	1947 Paris	4km Individual Pursuit
Silver medal – second place	1952 Paris	4km Individual Pursuit
Bronze medal – third place	1948 Amsterdam	4km Individual Pursuit
Bronze medal – third place	1953 Zürich	4km Individual Pursuit

Antonio Bevilacqua (22 October 1918 – 29 March 1972) was an Italian professional road bicycle racer. He won the 1951 Paris–Roubaix.

== Major results ==
1940 – Lygie
1941 – Dop, Ferroviario Venezia
1st, GP di Duca degli Abruzzi
1st, GP Maresciello dell Aria
1st, Coppa del Littirio
1942 – Bianchi
2nd, Milan–San Remo
7th, Giro di Lombardia
1943 – Viscontea
Pursuit Champion
1944 – VC Bassano
1946 – Wilier Triestina
17th, Giro d'Italia

Winner Stages 2 & 4

1947 – Lygie
1st, Stage 13, Giro d'Italia
(silver) World Pursuit Championship
1948 – Atala
1st, Stage 7, Giro d'Italia
(bronze) World Pursuit Championship
33rd, Tour de France
1949 – Atala
Pursuit Champion
40th, Giro d'Italia

Winner Stage 18

1950 – Wilier Triestina
World Pursuit Champion
Road Race Champion
Pursuit Champion
1st, Tre Valli Varesine
1st, Milano-Vicenza
1st, Trofeo Baracchi (with Fiorenzo Magni)
2nd, Giro di Lombardia
29th, Giro d'Italia
1951 – Benotto-Ursus
World Pursuit Champion
Pursuit Champion
1st, Paris–Roubaix
1st, Giro del Veneto
(bronze) World Road Race Championship
3rd, National Road Race Championship
26th, Giro d'Italia

Winner Stages 2 & 20

1952 – Benotto
1st, Milano–Vignola
(silver) World Road Race Championship
10th, World Road Race Championship
69th, Giro d'Italia

Winner Stages 3 & 20

1953 – Benotto
1st, Coppa Bernocchi
(bronze) World Road Race Championship
1954 – Doniselli-Lansetina

== Bibliography ==
- Gregori, Claudio (2012). Labrón—La vita e le avventure di Toni Bevilacqua [Labrón—The life and adventures of Toni Bevilacqua] (in Italian). Cassina de' Pecchi (Milan), Italy: Edizioni Roberto Vallardi. ISBN 978-88-95684-52-9.

Sporting positions
Preceded by Fausto Coppi	World Pursuit Champion; 1950–1951	Succeeded by Sidney Patterson
