= 1954 Tour de Suisse =

Race details
- Dates: 7–14 August 1954
- Stages: 7
- Distance: 1,477 km (917.8 mi)
- Winning time: 41h 28' 37"

Results
	Winner	Pasquale Fornara (ITA)
	Second	Agostino Coletto (ITA)
	Third	Giancarlo Astrua (ITA)

The 1954 Tour de Suisse was the 18th edition of the Tour de Suisse cycle race and was held from 7 August to 14 August 1954. The race started and finished in Zürich. The race was won by Pasquale Fornara.

== General classification ==
Final general classification

Rank	Rider	Time
1	Pasquale Fornara (ITA)	41h 28' 37"
2	Agostino Coletto (ITA)	+ 2' 54"
3	Giancarlo Astrua (ITA)	+ 3' 36"
4	Bruno Monti (ITA)	+ 5' 21"
5	Fausto Coppi (ITA)	+ 5' 32"
6	Marcel Huber (SUI)	+ 7' 40"
7	Primo Volpi (ITA)	+ 16' 38"
8	Gilbert Vermotte (BEL)	+ 17' 52"
9	Armin Russenberger (SUI)	+ 17' 58"
10	Walter Serena (ITA)	+ 18' 15"
