= 1949 Giro di Lombardia =

Race details
- Dates: 1949
- Stages: 1

Results
	Winner	Fausto Coppi (ITA)
	Second	Ferdi Kübler (SUI)
	Third	Nedo Logli (ITA)

== General classification ==
Final general classification

Rank	Rider	Team	Time
1	Fausto Coppi (ITA)	Bianchi-Ursus	
2	Ferdi Kübler (SUI)	Tebag	
3	Nedo Logli (ITA)	Arbos	
4	Fiorenzo Magni (ITA)	Wilier-Triestina	
5	Antonio Covolo (ITA)	Frejus	
6	Giorgio Albani (ITA)	Legnano	
7	Giulio Bresci (ITA)	Wilier-Triestina	
8	Pasquale Fornara (ITA)	Legnano	
9	Antonin Rolland (FRA)	Ricci	
10	Giancarlo Astrua (ITA)	Benotto	
