= Binotto =

Binotto is a surname. Notable people with the surname include:

- John Binotto (1919–2016), American football player
- Jonatan Binotto (born 1975), Italian footballer
- Mattia Binotto (born 1969), Swiss-Italian engineer and sportive functionary

== See also ==
- Benotto
