= Coppa San Geo =

Italian cycling race

Race details
- Date: February
- Region: Province of Brescia, Italy
- Discipline: Road race
- Competition: UCI Europe Tour
- Type: Single day race

History
- First edition: 1925
- Editions: 96 (as of 2020)
- First winner: Pietro Cevini (ITA)
- Most wins: Oreste Conte (ITA); Alberto Destro (ITA) (2 wins)
- Most recent: Enrico Zanoncello (ITA)

The Coppa San Geo is a one-day cycling race held annually in Italy. It was part of UCI Europe Tour in category 1.2 from 2007 to 2009, when it was reserved for amateurs in 2010.

== Winners ==
Year	Country	Rider	Team
2006	Italy	Roberto Ferrari	U.C. Trevigiani
2007	Croatia	Hrvoje Miholjević	
2008	Italy	Michele Merlo	
2009	Italy	Davide Cimolai	Marchiol–Pasta Montegrappa–Site–Heraclia
2010	Italy	Marco Zanotti	
2011	Italy	Renzo Zanelli	
2012	Italy	Daniele Cavasin	
2013	Italy	Matteo Collodel	Marchiol–Emisfero–Site
2014	Italy	Alberto Tocchella	
2015	Italy	Davide Ballerini	Unieuro–Wilier
2016	Italy	Michele Gazzara	Norda-MG.Kvis Vega
2017	Italy	Leonardo Bonifazio	MBH Bank Ballan CSB
2018	Italy	Filippo Tagliani	Delio Gallina Colosio Eurofeed
2019	Italy	Emanuele Pizzo	
2020	Italy	Enrico Zanoncello	
