= 1954 Giro di Lombardia =

Race details
- Dates: October 31, 1954
- Stages: 1
- Distance: 222 km (137.9 mi)
- Winning time: 5h 51' 33"

Results
	Winner	Fausto Coppi (ITA)	(Bianchi-Pirelli)
	Second	Fiorenzo Magni (ITA)	(Nivea-Fuchs)
	Third	Mino de Rossi (ITA)	(Bianchi-Pirelli)

The 1954 Giro di Lombardia cycling race took place on October 31, 1954, and was won by Bianchi-Pirelli's Fausto Coppi. It was the 48th edition of the Giro di Lombardia "monument" classic race.

== General classification ==
Pos.	Cyclist	Team	Time
1	(Italy) Fausto Coppi	Bianchi-Pirelli	5h51'33"
2	(Italy) Fiorenzo Magni	Nivea-Fuchs	s.t.
3	(Italy) Mino de Rossi	Bianchi-Pirelli	s.t.
4	(Italy) Bruno Landi	Fiorelli	s.t.
5	(Italy) Agostino Coletto	Nivea-Fuchs	s.t.
6	(Italy) Giorgio Albani	Legnano	s.t.
7	(Italy) Aldo Moser	Torpado	s.t.
8	(Italy) Walter Serena	Bottecchia	s.t.
9	(Italy) Primo Volpi	Arbos	s.t.
10	(Italy) Valerio Chiarlone	Welter	s.t.
