= 1947 UCI Track Cycling World Championships =

- Venue: Paris, France
- Date: 26 July - 3 August 1947
- Velodrome: Parc des Princes
- Events: 5

The 1947 UCI Track Cycling World Championships were the World Championship for track cycling. They took place in Paris, France from 26 July to 3 August 1947. Five events for men were contested, 3 for professionals and 2 for amateurs.

== Medal summary ==
Event	Gold	Silver	Bronze
Men's Professional Events
Men's sprint	Jef Scherens; Belgium	Louis Gérardin; France	Georges Senfftleben; France
Men's individual pursuit	Fausto Coppi; Italy	Antonio Bevilacqua; Italy	Hugo Koblet; Switzerland
Men's motor-paced	Raoul Lesueur; France	Jean-Jacques Lamboley; France	Jan Pronk; Netherlands
Men's Amateur Events
Men's sprint	Reg Harris; Great Britain	Cornelis Byster; Netherlands	Henri Sensever; France
Men's individual pursuit	Arnaldo Benfenati; Italy	Atilio François; Uruguay	Knud Andersen; Denmark

== Medal table ==
Rank	Nation	Gold	Silver	Bronze	Total
1	Italy (ITA)	2	1	0	3
2	France (FRA)	1	2	2	5
3	Belgium (BEL)	1	0	0	1
3	Great Britain (GBR)	1	0	0	1
5	Netherlands (NED)	0	1	1	2
6	Uruguay (URU)	0	1	0	1
7	Denmark (DEN)	0	0	1	1
7	Switzerland (SUI)	0	0	1	1
Totals (8 entries)		5	5	5	15

== See also ==
- 1947 UCI Road World Championships
