= 1942 Milan–San Remo =

Race details
- Dates: 19 March 1942
- Stages: 1
- Distance: 281.5 km (174.9 mi)
- Winning time: 8h 10' 00"

Results
| | Winner | Adolfo Leoni (ITA) | (Bianchi) |
| | Second | Antonio Bevilacqua (ITA) | (Bianchi) |
| | Third | Pierino Favalli (ITA) | (Legnano) |

The 1942 Milan–San Remo was the 35th edition of the Milan–San Remo cycle race and was held on 19 March 1942. The race started in Milan and finished in San Remo. The race was won by Adolfo Leoni of the Bianchi team.

== General classification ==
Final general classification

| Rank | Rider | Team | Time |
|---|---|---|---|
| 1 | Adolfo Leoni (ITA) | Bianchi | 8h 10' 00" |
| 2 | Antonio Bevilacqua (ITA) | Bianchi | s.t. |
| 3 | Pierino Favalli (ITA) | Legnano | s.t. |
| 4 | Giordano Cottur (ITA) | Viscontea | s.t. |
| 5 | Mario De Benedetti (ITA) | Legnano | s.t. |
| 6 | Marco Marangoni (ITA) | | s.t. |
| 7 | Giovanni Brotto (ITA) | Bianchi | s.t. |
| 8 | Giovanni De Stefanis (ITA) | Bianchi | s.t. |
| 9 | Cino Cinelli (ITA) | Bianchi | + 1' 45" |
| 10 | Osvaldo Bailo (ITA) | Viscontea | s.t. |
