= 1937 Giro di Lombardia =

Race details
- Dates: 23 October 1937
- Stages: 1
- Distance: 252 km (156.6 mi)
- Winning time: 7h 34' 05"

Results
	Winner	Aldo Bini (ITA)
	Second	Gino Bartali (ITA)
	Third	Aimone Landi (ITA)

The 1937 Giro di Lombardia was the 33rd edition of the Giro di Lombardia cycle race and was held on 23 October 1937. The race started and finished in Milan. The race was won by Aldo Bini of the Bianchi team.

== General classification ==
Final general classification

Rank	Rider	Team	Time
1	Aldo Bini (ITA)	Bianchi	7h 34' 05"
2	Gino Bartali (ITA)	Legnano	+ 3' 55"
3	Aimone Landi (ITA)		+ 3' 55"
4	Severino Canavesi (ITA)	Ganna	+ 3' 55"
5	Pietro Rimoldi (ITA)	Ganna	+ 3' 55"
6	Carlo Romanatti (ITA)	Bianchi	+ 3' 55"
7	Pierino Favalli (ITA)	Legnano	+ 8' 00"
8	Adriano Vignoli (ITA)	Maino	+ 8' 00"
9	Cesare Del Cancia (ITA)	Ganna	+ 8' 00"
10	Luigi Macchi (ITA)	Il Littorale	+ 8' 00"
