= 1948 Milan–San Remo =

Race details
- Dates: 19 March 1948
- Stages: 1
- Distance: 290.5 km (180.5 mi)
- Winning time: 7h 33' 20"

Results
	Winner	Fausto Coppi (ITA)	(Bianchi)
	Second	Vittorio Rossello (ITA)	(Legnano–Pirelli)
	Third	Fermo Camellini (ITA)	

The 1948 Milan–San Remo was the 39th edition of the Milan–San Remo cycle race and was held on 19 March 1948. The race started in Milan and finished in San Remo. The race was won by Fausto Coppi of the Bianchi team.

== General classification ==
Final general classification

Rank	Rider	Team	Time
1	Fausto Coppi (ITA)	Bianchi	7h 33' 20"
2	Vittorio Rossello (ITA)	Legnano–Pirelli	+ 5' 17"
3	Fermo Camellini (ITA)		s.t.
4	Olimpio Bizzi (ITA)		+ 8' 55"
5	Italo De Zan (ITA)	Atala	s.t.
6	Sergio Maggini (ITA)	Wilier Triestina	s.t.
7	Giordano Cottur (ITA)	Wilier Triestina	s.t.
8	Bernard Gauthier (FRA)	Mercier–Hutchinson	s.t.
9	Enzo Bellini (ITA)	Cimatti	s.t.
10	Mario Vicini (ITA)	Bianchi	s.t.
