= 1950 Paris–Roubaix =

Cycling race

Race details
- Dates: 9 April 1950
- Stages: 1
- Distance: 247 km (153.5 mi)
- Winning time: 6h 18' 48"

Results
	Winner	Fausto Coppi (ITA)
	Second	Maurice Diot (FRA)
	Third	Fiorenzo Magni (ITA)

The 1950 Paris–Roubaix was the 48th edition of the Paris–Roubaix, a classic one-day cycle race in France. The single day event was held on 9 April 1950 and stretched 247 km (153 mi) from Paris to the finish at Roubaix Velodrome. The winner was Fausto Coppi from Italy.

== Results ==
Final results (1–10)
Rank	Cyclist	Time
1	Fausto Coppi (ITA)	6h 18' 48″
2	Maurice Diot (FRA)	+2' 45″
3	Fiorenzo Magni (ITA)	+5' 24″
4	Charles Coste (FRA)	+5' 24″
5	Gino Sciardis (ITA)	+7' 07″
6	Pierre Molinéris (FRA)	+7' 40″
7	André Declerck (BEL)	+7' 54″
8	Georges Meunier (FRA)	+7' 54″
9	Georges Claes (BEL)	+7' 54″
10	Marcel Kint (BEL)	+7' 54″
