= Sergio Maggini =

Italian cyclist (1920–2021)

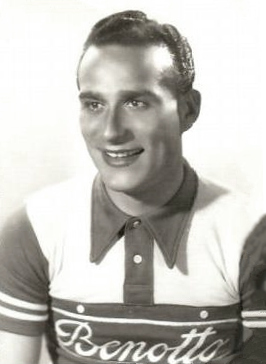

Personal information
- Born: 14 February 1920 Seano, Italy
- Died: 5 April 2021 (aged 101) Quarrata

Cycling career
- Sport: Cycling
- Current team: Retired
- Discipline: Road
- Role: Rider

Professional teams
- 1945–1947: Benotto
- 1948: Wilier Triestina
- 1949, 1951: Atala
- 1950: Taurea-Pirelli

Sergio Maggini (14 February 1920 – 5 April 2021) was an Italian road bicycle racer who competed professionally between 1945 and 1951, together with his younger brother Luciano.

== Major results ==
1944
1st Coppa del Re
1945
1st Coppa Bernocchi
2nd Trofeo Matteotti
3rd Road race, National Road Championships
1946
1st Gran Piemonte
2nd Giro dell'Emilia
2nd Gran Premio Industria e Commercio di Prato
9th Giro di Toscana
1947
1st Gran Premio Industria e Commercio di Prato
1st Trofeo Baracchi
2nd Coppa Bernocchi
3rd Milan-San Remo
7th Giro dell'Emilia
1948
1st Milano–Torino
3rd Giro di Toscana
6th Milan-San Remo
10th Giro di Romagna
1949
1st Stage 2 Giro d'Italia
1951
7th Milan-San Remo
7th Giro di Toscana
