= 1953 UCI Road World Championships =

- Venue: Lugano, Switzerland
- Date: 29-30 August 1953
- Coordinates: 46°00′18″N 08°57′09″E
- Events: 2

The 1953 UCI Road World Championships was the 26th edition of the UCI Road World Championships. It took place Saturday 29 and Sunday 30 August in Lugano, Switzerland.

The amateur race was ridden on Saturday, August 29. It was 180 kilometres long (12 laps). Italian Riccardo Filippi beat his compatriot Gastone Nencini in a sprint of two. Shortly behind, Belgian Rik Van Looy won the sprint of a group ahead of his compatriots Michel Van Aerde and André Noyelle.

The professional world championship was ridden on Sunday, August 30. The race was 18 laps long, totalling 270 kilometres. Seventy riders set off, of whom only 27 finished the race. Big favourite Fausto Coppi did not disappoint.

In the same period, the 1953 UCI Track Cycling World Championships was organized in the Oerlikon Velodrome in Zürich, Switzerland.

== Events Summary ==
Event	Gold		Silver		Bronze	
Men's Events
Professional Road Race	Fausto Coppi; Italy	7h 30' 59"	Germain Derijcke; Belgium	+ 6' 22"	Stan Ockers; Belgium	+ 7' 33"
Amateur Road Race	Riccardo Filippi; Italy	-	Gastone Nencini; Italy	-	Rik Van Looy; Belgium	-

== Medal table ==
Place	Nation	1st place, gold medalist(s)	2nd place, silver medalist(s)	3rd place, bronze medalist(s)	Total
1	Italy	2	1	0	3
2	Belgium	0	1	2	3
Total		2	2	2	6
