= 1949 Milan–San Remo =

Race details
- Dates: 19 March 1949
- Stages: 1
- Distance: 290.5 km (180.5 mi)
- Winning time: 7h 22' 25"

Results
	Winner	Fausto Coppi (ITA)	(Bianchi–Ursus)
	Second	Vito Ortelli (ITA)	(Atala)
	Third	Fiorenzo Magni (ITA)	(Wilier Triestina)

The 1949 Milan–San Remo was the 40th edition of the Milan–San Remo cycle race and was held on 19 March 1949. The race started in Milan and finished in San Remo. The race was won by Fausto Coppi of the Bianchi–Ursus team.

== General classification ==
Final general classification

Rank	Rider	Team	Time
1	Fausto Coppi (ITA)	Bianchi–Ursus	7h 22' 25"
2	Vito Ortelli (ITA)	Atala	+ 4' 17"
3	Fiorenzo Magni (ITA)	Wilier Triestina	s.t.
4	Italo De Zan (ITA)	Atala	s.t.
5	Vincenzo Rossello (ITA)	Legnano–Pirelli	s.t.
6	Édouard Fachleitner (FRA)	France Sport–Dunlop	s.t.
7	Fermo Camellini (FRA)		s.t.
8	Ernest Sterckx (BEL)	Ganna–Ursus	+ 5' 46"
9	Maurice Desimpelaere (BEL)	Ganna–Ursus	s.t.
10	Silvio Pedroni (ITA)	Fréjus–Pirelli	+ 5' 50"
