= Primo Volpi =

Italian cyclist

Personal information
- Born: 26 April 1916 Castiglione d'Orcia, Italy
- Died: 28 November 2006 (aged 90) Empoli, Italy

Cycling career
- Sport: Cycling
- Discipline: Road
- Role: Rider

Primo Volpi (26 April 1916 – 28 November 2006) was an Italian racing cyclist. He rode in the 1947 and 1948 Tour de France.

== Major results ==
1940
1st Stage 9 Giro d'Italia
1945
2nd Giro di Campania
3rd Giro del Piemonte
1946
10th Overall Giro d'Italia
1948
5th Overall Giro d'Italia
1949
1st Stage 7 Giro di Sicilia
1st Stage 4 Giro del Lazio
1950
1st Stage 14 Tour d'Algérie
2nd Giro di Toscana
1951
1st Overall Giro di Sicilia
1st Overall Volta a Catalunya
1952
1st Coppa Bernocchi
1st Coppa Sabatini
1953
1st Coppa Sabatini
1st Stage 6 GP Mediterraneo
1st Stage 5 Giro di Sicilia
3rd Overall Giro della Provincia di Reggio Calabria
4th Giro del Veneto
1954
1st Overall Tour d'Europe

1st Stage 11

7th Overall Tour de Suisse

1st Stage 6

9th Giro di Lombardia
1955
1st Stage 6 Vuelta a Asturias
