= Aldo Bini =

Italian cyclist

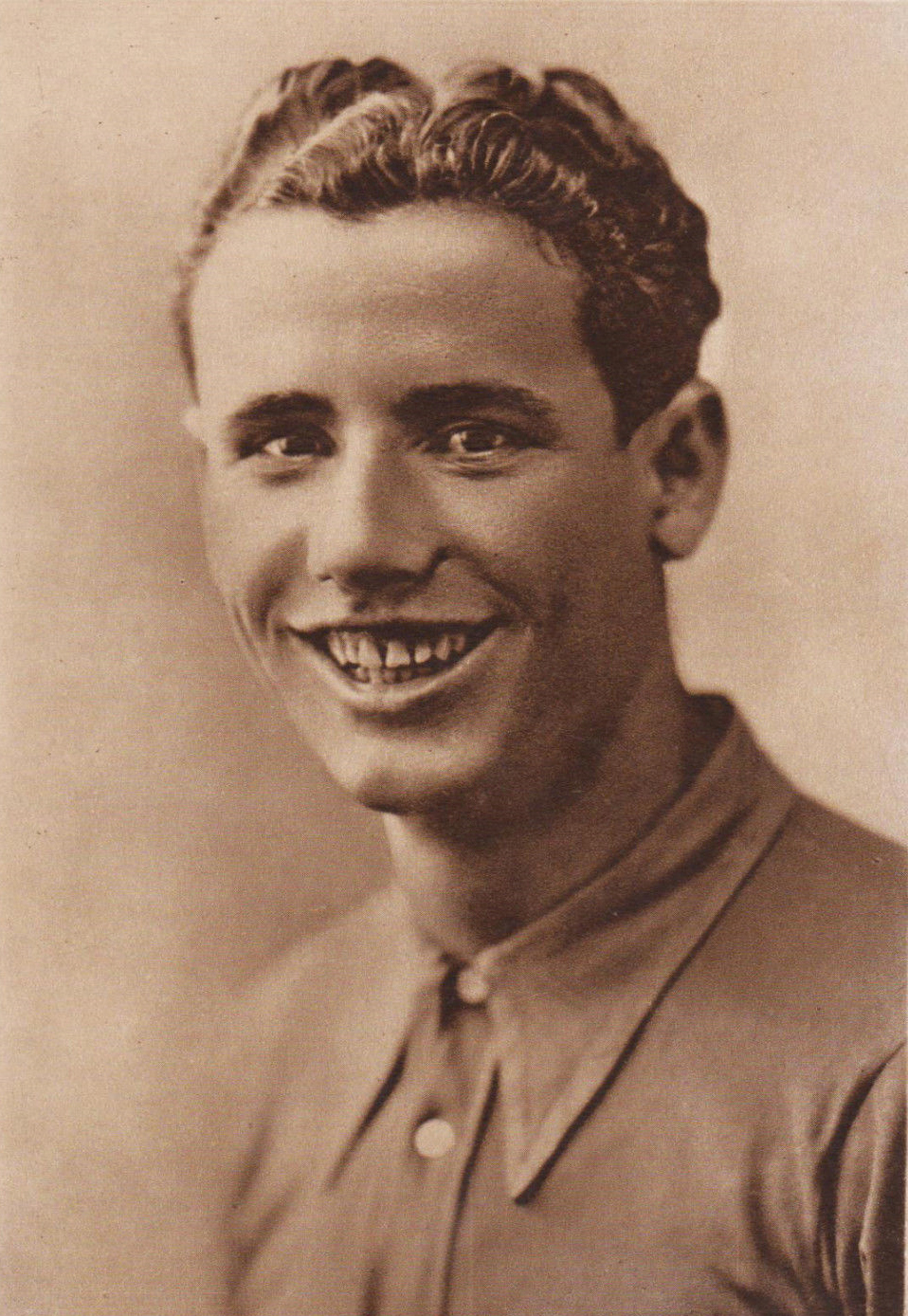
- Bini c. 1937

Personal information
- Full name: Aldo Bini
- Born: 30 July 1915 Montemurlo, Italy
- Died: 16 June 1993 (aged 77) Prato, Italy

Cycling career
- Sport: Cycling
- Discipline: Road
- Role: Rider

Major wins
- Grand Tours Giro d'Italia Maglia Nera classification (1948) 5 individual stages (1936, 1937, 1946) One-day races and Classics Giro di Lombardia (1937, 1942) Giro del Piemonte (1935, 1936, 1941) Milano–Torino (1952) Giro dell'Emilia (1935) Coppa Bernocchi (1940) Milano–Modena (1936, 1937, 1938) Giro dell'Umbria (1936)
Medal record
Representing Italy
Men's road bicycle racing
World Championships
Silver medal – second place	1936 Bern	Elite Men's Road Race

Aldo Bini (30 July 1915 – 16 June 1993) was an Italian road bicycle racer. He won several one-day races, as well as four stages of Giro d'Italia in 1936–1937. He placed second at the 1936 World Championships and 48th in the 1938 Tour de France.

== Major results ==
1935
1st, Giro dell'Emilia
1st, Giro del Piemonte
1936
1st, Giro del Piemonte
1st, Giro dell'Umbria
1st, Milano-Modena
1st, Stage 2, Giro d'Italia
1937
1st, Giro di Lombardia
1st, Milano-Modena
1st, Stages 13, 14 & 19b, Giro d'Italia
Giro della provincia Milano (with Maurice Archambaud)
1938
1st, Milano-Modena
1940
1st, Coppa Bernocchi
1941
1st, Giro del Piemonte
1942
1st, Giro di Lombardia
1946
1st, Stage 5b, Giro d'Italia
1948
Giro d'Italia Maglia Nera winner
1952
1st, Milano–Torino
