= Italo De Zan =

Italian cyclist (1925–2020)

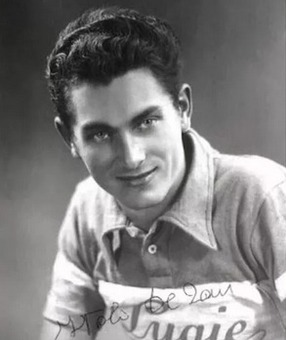
- De Zan in 1946

Personal information
- Born: 1 July 1925 San Fior, Italy
- Died: 9 March 2020 (aged 94) Treviso, Italy

Cycling career
- Sport: Cycling
- Role: Rider

Professional team
- 1947–1949: Atala

Italo De Zan (1 July 1925 – 9 March 2020) was an Italian racing cyclist. He won stage 10 of the 1948 Giro d'Italia. De Zan died from COVID-19 in Treviso on 9 March 2020. He was 94 years old.

== Major results ==
1946
1st Coppa del Re
4th Giro di Lombardia
1947
1st Milano–Torino
3rd Giro di Lombardia
6th Giro dell'Emilia
6th Milano-Mantova
1948
1st Stage 10 Giro d'Italia
2nd Milano–Torino
2nd Coppa Placci
3rd Giro di Romagna
5th Milan–San Remo
1949
1st GP Alghero
3rd Milano–Torino
4th Milan–San Remo
