= 1942 Giro di Lombardia =

Race details
- Dates: 1942
- Stages: 1

Results
	Winner	Aldo Bini (ITA)
	Second	Gino Bartali (ITA)
	Third	Quirino Toccacelli (ITA)

== General classification ==
Final general classification

Rank	Rider	Team	Time
1	Aldo Bini (ITA)	Viscontea	
2	Gino Bartali (ITA)	Legnano	
3	Quirino Toccaceli (ITA)		
4	Cino Cinelli (ITA)	Bianchi	
5	Glauco Servadei (ITA)	Bianchi	
6	Marcello Spadolini (ITA)	Lazio SS	
