= Benotto =

Benotto may refer to:

- Titanbonifica–Benotto, Italian professional cycling team that existed from 1986 to 1989
- Vivi–Benotto, Italian professional cycling team that existed from 1982 to 1983

== See also ==
- Binotto (disambiguation)
