= Oreste Conte =

Italian cyclist

Personal information
- Born: 19 July 1919 Udine, Italy
- Died: 7 October 1956 (aged 37) Bergamo, Italy

Cycling career
- Sport: Cycling
- Discipline: Road
- Role: Rider

Oreste Conte (19 July 1919 – 7 October 1956) was an Italian racing cyclist. He rode in the 1948 Tour de France.

== Major results ==
1939
1st Coppa San Geo
1941
1st Coppa San Geo
1944
1st Coppa Bernocchi
1946
1st Stages 11, 16a & 17 Giro d'Italia
2nd Milano–Torino
1947
1st Stages 7 & 11 Giro d'Italia
1st Milano–Modena
1948
1st Stages 12 & 14 Giro d'Italia
1949
1st Stages 12 & 16 Giro d'Italia
1950
1st Stages 1 & 18 Giro d'Italia
3rd Milan–San Remo
1952
1st Stage 2 Deutschland Tour
1st Stages 12 Giro d'Italia
2nd Milano–Torino
1953
1st Stages 12 Giro d'Italia
