= Vito Ortelli =

Italian cyclist

Personal information
- Born: 5 July 1921 Faenza, Italy
- Died: 24 February 2017 (aged 95)

Cycling career
- Sport: Cycling
- Current team: Retired
- Disciplines: Road, track
- Role: Rider

Professional teams
- 1942–1943: Bianchi
- 1945–1947: Benotto
- 1948–1949: Olympia–Dunlop
- 1948–1951: Atala–Pirelli
- 1952: Lygie

Vito Ortelli (5 July 1921 – 24 February 2017) was an Italian racing cyclist. Ortelli died on 24 February 2017, aged 95.

== Major results ==
1940
1st Giro della Provincia Milano (with Fiorenzo Magni)
1942
1st Giro di Toscana
1945
National Pursuit Champion
1st Milano–Torino
1946
National Pursuit Champion
1st Milano–Torino
1st Stage 6 Giro d'Italia
2nd Giro della Romagna
3rd Giro di Toscana
3rd National Road Race Championships
1947
1st Giro del Piemonte
2nd National Road Race Championships
1948
National Road Race Champion
1st Giro della Romagna
2nd Milano-Modena
2nd Giro di Campania
1949
2nd Milan–San Remo
1950
3rd Giro della Provincia di Reggio Calabria
3rd Giro della Romagna
