= Mario Ricci =

Italian cyclist

Personal information
- Born: 13 August 1914 Padua, Italy
- Died: 22 February 2005 (aged 90) Como, Italy

Cycling career
- Sport: Cycling
- Role: Rider

Mario Ricci (13 August 1914 – 22 February 2005) was an Italian cyclist. He rode in seven editions of the Giro d'Italia, and the 1949 Tour de France. Ricci also won the Giro di Lombardia in 1941 and 1945.
