= Adolfo Leoni =

Italian cyclist

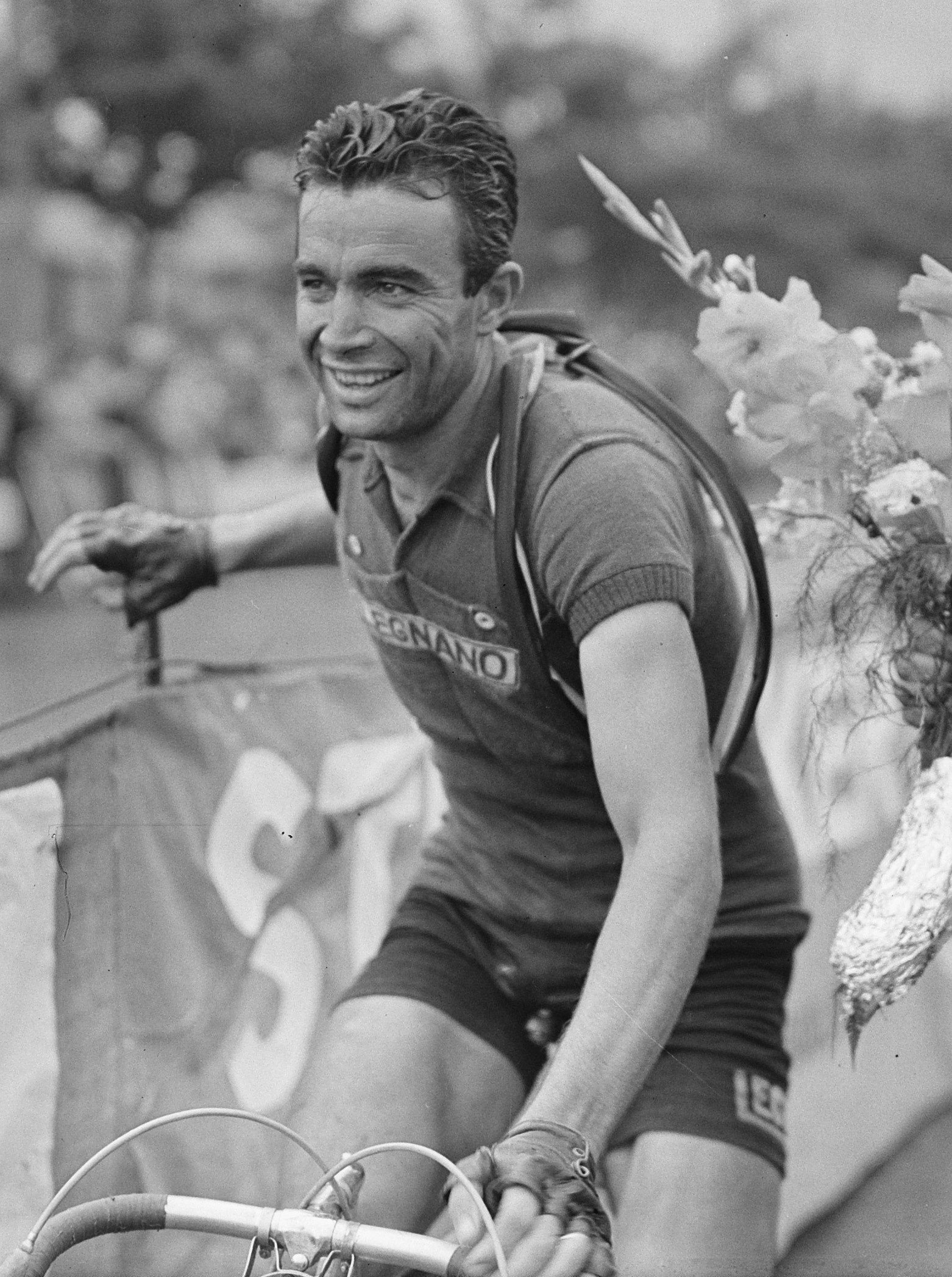
- Leoni at the 1950 Tour de France

Personal information
- Full name: Adolfo Leoni
- Born: 13 January 1917 Massa, Italy
- Died: 19 October 1970 (aged 53) Gualdo Tadino, Italy

Cycling career
- Sport: Cycling
- Discipline: Road
- Role: Rider

Major wins
- Milan–San Remo (1942)
Medal record
Representing Italy
Men's road bicycle racing
World Championships
Gold medal – first place	1937 Copenhagen	Amateur's Road Race

Adolfo Leoni (Gualdo Tadino, 13 January 1917 – Massa, 19 October 1970) was an Italian professional road bicycle racer. Leoni won many classic races before, during, and after the Second World War.

== Major results ==
1937
World Amateur road race champion
1939
Coppa Bernocchi
Giro del Veneto
Milano-Mantova
1940
GP Leptis Magna
Milano-Mantova
1941
Giro del Lazio
Italian National Road Race Championship
1942
Milan–San Remo
Giro dell'Emilia
1945
Tre Valli Varesine
1946
Giro dell'Emilia
1948
Sassari-Cagliari
1949
Giro del Piemonte
1950
Tour de France:

Winner stage 2
