= List of teams and cyclists in the 1947 Tour de France =

The national teams format, which had been in use before the Second World War, was used again in the 1947 Tour de France. The German team was not invited, and the Italian team was made up out of Franco-Italians living in France, as the peace treaty between France and Italy was not yet official, so the countries were technically still in war. The Tour organisers invited ten teams of ten cyclists each. Besides the Italian team, there was also a French team and a Belgian team, and a combined Swiss/Luxembourgian team The plan was to have a joint Dutch-British team, but the Dutch cyclists protested because the British cyclists were too inexperienced, and the British cyclists were replaced by "French strangers". There were also five French regional teams: Ile de France, West France, North East France, Center/South West France and South East France.

There were 58 French cyclists, 13 Italian, 11 Belgian, 6 Dutch, 6 Swiss, 4 Luxembourg, 1 Polish and 1 Algerian cyclist. Of the 100 cyclists, 53 finished the race.

== Start list ==
=== By team ===
Belgium
No.	Rider	Pos.
1	Jean Breuer (BEL)	45
2	Norbert Callens (BEL)	DNF
3	Roger Gyselinck (BEL)	43
4	Raymond Impanis (BEL)	6
5	Florent Mathieu (BEL)	27
6	Maurice Mollin (BEL)	42
7	René Oreel (BEL)	38
8	Prosper Depredomme (BEL)	DNF
9	Briek Schotte (BEL)	13
10	Albert Sercu (BEL)	DNF

Netherlands/Strangers of France
No.	Rider	Pos.
11	Sjefke Janssen (NED)	32
12	André de Korver (NED)	DNF
13	Bouk Schellingerhoudt (NED)	DNF
14	Huub Sijen (NED)	DNF
15	Albert van Schendel (NED)	DNF
16	Arie Vooren (NED)	DNF
17	Fermo Camellini (ITA)	7
18	Eugenio Galliussi (ITA)	DNF
19	Victor Joly (BEL)	47
20	Edward Klabiński (POL)	34

Italy
No.	Rider	Pos.
21	Elio Bertocchi (ITA)	DNF
22	Olimpio Bizzi (ITA)	DNF
23	Pierre Brambilla (ITA)	3
24	Giovanni Corrieri (ITA)	DNF
25	Giordano Cottur (ITA)	8
26	Egidio Feruglio (ITA)	31
27	Aldo Ronconi (ITA)	4
28	Vincenzo Rossello (ITA)	DNF
29	Giuseppe Tacca (ITA)	14
30	Primo Volpi (ITA)	23

Switzerland/Luxembourg
No.	Rider	Pos.
31	Leo Amberg (SUI)	DNF
32	Ferdinand Kübler (SUI)	DNF
33	Robert Lang (SUI)	DNF
34	Gottfried Weilenmann (SUI)	17
35	Leo Weilenmann (SUI)	52
36	Pietro Tarchini (SUI)	53
37	Henri Ackermann (LUX)	DNF
38	Bim Diederich (LUX)	15
39	Jean Goldschmit (LUX)	20
40	Jeng Kirchen (LUX)	18

France
No.	Rider	Pos.
41	Louison Bobet (FRA)	DNF
42	Louis Caput (FRA)	DNF
43	Édouard Fachleitner (FRA)	2
44	Manuel Huguet (FRA)	DNF
45	Émile Idée (FRA)	DNF
46	Henri Massal (FRA)	30
47	Kléber Piot (FRA)	25
48	Lucien Teisseire (FRA)	11
49	Louis Thiétard (FRA)	DNF
50	René Vietto (FRA)	5

France - Île de France
No.	Rider	Pos.
51	René Barret (FRA)	41
52	Robert Bonnaventure (FRA)	DNF
53	Urbain Caffi (FRA)	DNF
54	Victor Cosson (FRA)	DNF
55	Maurice Diot (FRA)	49
56	Robert Charpentier (FRA)	DNF
57	Raymond Lucas (FRA)	44
58	Paul Maye (FRA)	DNF
59	Édouard Muller (FRA)	36
60	Daniel Thuayre (FRA)	16

France - West
No.	Rider	Pos.
61	Louis Bocquet (FRA)	DNF
62	Pierre Cogan (FRA)	12
63	Jean-Marie Goasmat (FRA)	9
64	Raymond Guégan (FRA)	DNF
65	Ange Le Strat (FRA)	33
66	André Mahé (FRA)	DNF
67	Roger Pontet (FRA)	DNF
68	Jean Robic (FRA)	1
69	Gaston Rousseau (FRA)	50
70	Eloi Tassin (FRA)	37

France - North-East
No.	Rider	Pos.
71	Gaston Audier (FRA)	51
72	Jean-Baptiste Delille (FRA)	DNF
73	Maurice De Muer (FRA)	DNF
74	Louis Déprez (FRA)	35
75	Alphonse De Vreese (FRA)	DNF
76	Robert Dorgebray (FRA)	DNF
77	Louis Gauthier (FRA)	DNF
78	Jean de Gribaldy (FRA)	46
79	Alexandre Pawlisiak (FRA)	48
80	Georges Martin (FRA)	DNF

France - Centre/South-West
No.	Rider	Pos.
81	Joseph Berrini (FRA)	DNF
82	Albert Bourlon (FRA)	21
83	Camille Danguillaume (FRA)	DNF
84	Joseph Dessertine (FRA)	DNF
85	Raphaël Géminiani (FRA)	DNF
86	Antoine Latorre (FRA)	26
87	Roger Lévêque (FRA)	24
88	Alfred Macorig (FRA)	DNF
89	Joseph Neri (FRA)	40
90	Yves Pierracci (FRA)	DNF

France - South-East
No.	Rider	Pos.
91	Marius Bonnet (FRA)	29
92	Ahmed Chibane (FRA)	DNF
93	Pierre Fautrier (FRA)	DNF
94	Bernard Gauthier (FRA)	22
95	Paul Giguet (FRA)	19
96	Pascal Gnazzo (FRA)	39
97	Apo Lazaridès (FRA)	10
98	Paul Néri (ITA)	DNF
99	Victor Pernac (FRA)	DNF
100	Raoul Rémy (FRA)	28

=== By rider ===
Legend
No.	Starting number worn by the rider during the Tour
Pos.	Position in the general classification
DNF	Denotes a rider who did not finish

No.	Name	Nationality	Team	Age	Pos.	Time	Ref
1	Jean Breuer	Belgium	Belgium	27	45	+ 4h 45' 14"	
2	Norbert Callens	Belgium	Belgium	23	DNF	—	
3	Roger Gyselinck	Belgium	Belgium	26	43	+ 4h 43' 47"	
4	Raymond Impanis	Belgium	Belgium	21	6	+ 18' 14"	
5	Florent Mathieu	Belgium	Belgium	28	27	+ 3h 16' 28"	
6	Maurice Mollin	Belgium	Belgium	23	42	+ 4h 42' 27"	
7	René Oreel	Belgium	Belgium	24	38	+ 4h 29' 06"	
8	Prosper Depredomme	Belgium	Belgium	29	DNF	—	
9	Briek Schotte	Belgium	Belgium	27	13	+ 1h 56' 45"	
10	Albert Sercu	Belgium	Belgium	29	DNF	—	
11	Sjefke Janssen	Netherlands	Netherlands/Strangers of France	27	32	+ 3h 57' 11"	
12	André de Korver	Netherlands	Netherlands/Strangers of France	32	DNF	—	
13	Bouk Schellingerhoudt	Netherlands	Netherlands/Strangers of France	28	DNF	—	
14	Huub Sijen	Netherlands	Netherlands/Strangers of France	28	DNF	—	
15	Albert van Schendel	Netherlands	Netherlands/Strangers of France	34	DNF	—	
16	Arie Vooren	Netherlands	Netherlands/Strangers of France	24	DNF	—	
17	Fermo Camellini	Italy	Netherlands/Strangers of France	32	7	+ 24' 08"	
18	Eugenio Galliussi	Italy	Netherlands/Strangers of France	31	DNF	—	
19	Victor Joly	Belgium	Netherlands/Strangers of France	24	47	+ 4h 52' 18"	
20	Edward Klabiński	Poland	Netherlands/Strangers of France	26	34	+ 4h 06' 36"	
21	Elio Bertocchi	Italy	Italy	27	DNF	—	
22	Olimpio Bizzi	Italy	Italy	30	DNF	—	
23	Pierre Brambilla	Italy	Italy	28	3	+ 10' 07"	
24	Giovanni Corrieri	Italy	Italy	27	DNF	—	
25	Giordano Cottur	Italy	Italy	33	8	+ 1h 06' 03"	
26	Egidio Feruglio	Italy	Italy	26	31	+ 3h 43' 04"	
27	Aldo Ronconi	Italy	Italy	28	4	+ 11' 00"	
28	Vincenzo Rossello	Italy	Italy	24	DNF	—	
29	Giuseppe Tacca	Italy	Italy	29	14	+ 2h 06' 07"	
30	Primo Volpi	Italy	Italy	31	23	+ 3h 02' 48"	
31	Leo Amberg	Switzerland	Switzerland/Luxembourg	35	DNF	—	
32	Ferdinand Kübler	Switzerland	Switzerland/Luxembourg	27	DNF	—	
33	Robert Lang	Switzerland	Switzerland/Luxembourg	29	DNF	—	
34	Gottfried Weilenmann	Switzerland	Switzerland/Luxembourg	27	17	+ 2h 18' 23"	
35	Leo Weilenmann	Switzerland	Switzerland/Luxembourg	24	52	+ 6h 05' 34"	
36	Pietro Tarchini	Switzerland	Switzerland/Luxembourg	25	53	+ 7h 48' 18"	
37	Henri Ackermann	Luxembourg	Switzerland/Luxembourg	24	DNF	—	
38	Bim Diederich	Luxembourg	Switzerland/Luxembourg	25	15	+ 2h 10' 43"	
39	Jean Goldschmit	Luxembourg	Switzerland/Luxembourg	23	20	+ 2h 32' 24"	
40	Jeng Kirchen	Luxembourg	Switzerland/Luxembourg	27	18	+ 2h 20' 26"	
41	Louison Bobet	France	France	22	DNF	—	
42	Louis Caput	France	France	26	DNF	—	
43	Édouard Fachleitner	France	France	26	2	+ 3' 58"	
44	Manuel Huguet	France	France	28	DNF	—	
45	Émile Idée	France	France	26	DNF	—	
46	Henri Massal	France	France	26	30	+ 3h 25' 49"	
47	Kléber Piot	France	France	26	25	+ 3h 10' 48"	
48	Lucien Teisseire	France	France	27	11	+ 1h 32' 16"	
49	Louis Thiétard	France	France	37	DNF	—	
50	René Vietto	France	France	33	5	+ 15' 23"	
51	René Barret	France	France - Île de France	24	41	+ 4h 38' 31"	
52	Robert Bonnaventure	France	France - Île de France	26	DNF	—	
53	Urbain Caffi	France	France - Île de France	30	DNF	—	
54	Victor Cosson	France	France - Île de France	31	DNF	—	
55	Maurice Diot	France	France - Île de France	25	49	+ 5h 20' 43"	
56	Robert Charpentier	France	France - Île de France	31	DNF	—	
57	Raymond Lucas	France	France - Île de France	28	44	+ 4h 45' 07"	
58	Paul Maye	France	France - Île de France	33	DNF	—	
59	Édouard Muller	France	France - Île de France	28	36	+ 4h 17' 28"	
60	Daniel Thuayre	France	France - Île de France	23	16	+ 2h 13' 04"	
61	Louis Bocquet	France	France - West	25	DNF	—	
62	Pierre Cogan	France	France - West	33	12	+ 1h 44' 55"	
63	Jean-Marie Goasmat	France	France - West	34	9	+ 1h 16' 03"	
64	Raymond Guégan	France	France - West	25	DNF	—	
65	Ange Le Strat	France	France - West	29	33	+ 4h 06' 23"	
66	André Mahé	France	France - West	27	DNF	—	
67	Roger Pontet	France	France - West	27	DNF	—	
68	Jean Robic	France	France - West	26	1	148h 11' 25"	
69	Gaston Rousseau	France	France - West	21	50	+ 5h 34' 01"	
70	Eloi Tassin	France	France - West	35	37	+ 4h 23' 49"	
71	Gaston Audier	France	France - North-East	34	51	+ 5h 37' 55"	
72	Jean-Baptiste Delille	France	France - North-East	34	DNF	—	
73	Maurice De Muer	France	France - North-East	25	DNF	—	
74	Louis Déprez	France	France - North-East	26	35	+ 4h 09' 29"	
75	Alphonse De Vreese	France	France - North-East	25	DNF	—	
76	Robert Dorgebray	France	France - North-East	31	DNF	—	
77	Louis Gauthier	France	France - North-East	31	DNF	—	
78	Jean de Gribaldy	France	France - North-East	24	46	+ 4h 51' 44"	
79	Alexandre Pawlisiak	France	France - North-East	34	48	+ 5h 04' 06"	
80	Georges Martin	France	France - North-East	31	DNF	—	
81	Joseph Berrini	France	France - Centre/South-West	28	DNF	—	
82	Albert Bourlon	France	France - Centre/South-West	30	21	+ 2h 38' 18"	
83	Camille Danguillaume	France	France - Centre/South-West	28	DNF	—	
84	Joseph Dessertine	France	France - Centre/South-West	24	DNF	—	
85	Raphaël Géminiani	France	France - Centre/South-West	22	DNF	—	
86	Antoine Latorre	France	France - Centre/South-West	31	26	+ 3h 14' 40"	
87	Roger Lévêque	France	France - Centre/South-West	26	24	+ 3h 05' 04"	
88	Alfred Macorig	France	France - Centre/South-West	25	DNF	—	
89	Joseph Neri	France	France - Centre/South-West	32	40	+ 4h 36' 27"	
90	Yves Pierracci	France	France - Centre/South-West	30	DNF	—	
91	Marius Bonnet	France	France - South-East	25	29	+ 3h 21' 20"	
92	Ahmed Chibane	France	France - South-East	30	DNF	—	
93	Pierre Fautrier	France	France - South-East	24	DNF	—	
94	Bernard Gauthier	France	France - South-East	22	22	+ 2h 52' 45"	
95	Paul Giguet	France	France - South-East	32	19	+ 2h 26' 25"	
96	Pascal Gnazzo	France	France - South-East	26	39	+ 4h 34' 09"	
97	Apo Lazaridès	France	France - South-East	21	10	+ 1h 18' 44"	
98	Paul Néri	Italy	France - South-East	30	DNF	—	
99	Victor Pernac	France	France - South-East	25	DNF	—	
100	Raoul Rémy	France	France - South-East	27	28	+ 3h 20' 31"	
