= 1947 Tour de France, Stage 1 to Stage 11 =

Cycling race stages

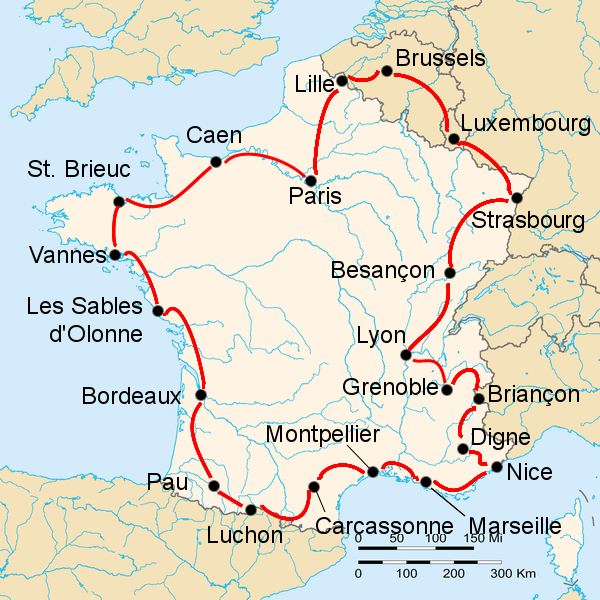
Route of the 1947 Tour de France

The 1947 Tour de France was the 34th edition of Tour de France, one of cycling's Grand Tours. The Tour began in Paris with a flat stage on 25 June, and Stage 11 occurred on 7 July with a flat stage to Marseille. The race finished in Paris on 20 July.

== Classification standings ==
Legend (Note: Jerseys appearing in the table on the left of the page indicate those worn by the cyclist during the particular stage, while those appearing in the table on the right of the page indicate those awarded to the cyclist after the stage.)
| A yellow jersey | Denotes the leader of the general classification | MG | Denotes the leader of the mountains classification (Note: No jersey was awarded to the leader of the mountains classification until a white jersey with red polka dots was introduced in 1975.) (meilleur grimpeur) |
| | s.t. indicates that the rider was credited with the same time as the one directly above him. | | |

== Stage 1 ==
25 June 1947 — Paris to Lille, 236 km (147 mi)

Stage 1 result and general classification after stage 1

| Rank | Rider | Team | Time |
|---|---|---|---|
| 1 | Ferdinand Kübler (SUI) | Switzerland/Luxembourg | 6h 51' 55" |
| 2 | André Mahé (FRA) | France - West | s.t. |
| 3 | Kléber Piot (FRA) | France | + 1' 24" |
| 4 | Arie Vooren (NED) | Netherlands/Strangers of France | + 1' 30" |
| 5 | Edward Klabiński (POL) | Netherlands/Strangers of France | + 1' 39" |
| 6 | Briek Schotte (BEL) | Belgium | + 1' 47" |
| 7 | Aldo Ronconi (ITA) | Italy | + 1' 52" |
| 8 | Pierre Brambilla (ITA) | Italy | + 1' 57" |
| 9 | Jean Robic (FRA) | France - West | + 2' 09" |
| 10 | Giuseppe Tacca (ITA) | Italy | s.t. |

== Stage 2 ==
26 June 1947 — Lille to Brussels (Belgium), 182 km (113 mi)

Stage 2 result

| Rank | Rider | Team | Time |
|---|---|---|---|
| 1 | René Vietto (FRA) | France | 5h 05' 52" |
| 2 | Raymond Impanis (BEL) | Belgium | + 1' 41" |
| 3 | Prosper Depredomme (BEL) | Belgium | s.t. |
| 4 | Fermo Camellini (ITA) | Netherlands/Strangers of France | + 8' 59" |
| 5 | Aldo Ronconi (ITA) | Italy | s.t. |
| 6 | Jean Breuer (BEL) | Belgium | s.t. |
| 7 | Pierre Cogan (FRA) | France - West | s.t. |
| 8 | André Mahé (FRA) | France - West | s.t. |
| 9 | Pierre Brambilla (ITA) | Italy | s.t. |
| 10 | Manuel Huguet (FRA) | France | + 9' 12" |

General classification after stage 2

| Rank | Rider | Team | Time |
|---|---|---|---|
| 1 | René Vietto (FRA) | France | 11h 59' 45" |
| 2 | Raymond Impanis (BEL) | Belgium | + 3' 28" |
| 3 | André Mahé (FRA) | France - West | + 6' 31" |
| 4 | Aldo Ronconi (ITA) | Italy | + 8' 53" |
| 5 | Pierre Brambilla (ITA) | Italy | + 8' 58" |
| 6 | Arie Vooren (NED) | Netherlands/Strangers of France | + 10' 15" |
| 7 | Briek Schotte (BEL) | Belgium | + 10' 22" |
| 8 | Jean Robic (FRA) | France - West | + 10' 44" |
| 9 | Ferdinand Kübler (SUI) | Switzerland/Luxembourg | + 11' 18" |
| 10 | Giuseppe Tacca (ITA) | Italy | + 11' 28" |

== Stage 3 ==
27 June 1947 — Brussels (Belgium) to Luxembourg City (Luxembourg), 314 km (195 mi)

Stage 3 result

| Rank | Rider | Team | Time |
|---|---|---|---|
| 1 | Aldo Ronconi (ITA) | Italy | 10h 59' 13" |
| 2 | Pierre Cogan (FRA) | France - West | + 5' 34" |
| 3 | Fermo Camellini (ITA) | Netherlands/Strangers of France | s.t. |
| 4 | Pierre Brambilla (ITA) | Italy | s.t. |
| 5 | René Vietto (FRA) | France | + 6' 31" |
| 6 | Vincenzo Rossello (ITA) | Italy | + 11' 08" |
| 7 | Antoine Latorre (FRA) | France - Centre/South-West | + 11' 43" |
| 8 | Jean Robic (FRA) | France - West | + 15' 01" |
| 9 | Maurice Diot (FRA) | France - Île de France | + 17' 27" |
| 10 | Gottfried Weilenmann (SUI) | Switzerland/Luxembourg | s.t. |

General classification after stage 3

| Rank | Rider | Team | Time |
|---|---|---|---|
| 1 | René Vietto (FRA) | France | 23h 05' 29" |
| 2 | Aldo Ronconi (ITA) | Italy | + 1' 22" |
| 3 | Pierre Brambilla (ITA) | Italy | + 8' 01" |
| 4 | Pierre Cogan (FRA) | France - West | + 10' 56" |
| 5 | Fermo Camellini (ITA) | Netherlands/Strangers of France | + 12' 11" |
| 6 | Raymond Impanis (BEL) | Belgium | + 15' 04" |
| 7 | Jean Robic (FRA) | France - West | + 19' 24" |
| 8 | Gottfried Weilenmann (SUI) | Switzerland/Luxembourg | + 23' 47" |
| 9 | Briek Schotte (BEL) | Belgium | + 26' 23" |
| 10 | Giuseppe Tacca (ITA) | Italy | + 27' 19" |

== Stage 4 ==
28 June 1947 — Luxembourg City (Luxembourg) to Strasbourg, 223 km (139 mi)

Stage 4 result

| Rank | Rider | Team | Time |
|---|---|---|---|
| 1 | Jean Robic (FRA) | France - West | 8h 14' 29" |
| 2 | Ferdinand Kübler (SUI) | Switzerland/Luxembourg | + 1' 01" |
| 3 | Maurice Diot (FRA) | France - Île de France | + 2' 53" |
| 4 | Alexandre Pawlisiak (FRA) | France - North-East | s.t. |
| 5 | Raoul Rémy (FRA) | France - South-East | s.t. |
| 6 | Albert Sercu (BEL) | Belgium | + 3' 15" |
| 7 | Pierre Cogan (FRA) | France - West | s.t. |
| 8 | Giuseppe Tacca (ITA) | Italy | s.t. |
| 9 | Florent Mathieu (BEL) | Belgium | s.t. |
| 10 | Briek Schotte (BEL) | Belgium | s.t. |

General classification after stage 4

| Rank | Rider | Team | Time |
|---|---|---|---|
| 1 | René Vietto (FRA) | France | 31h 23' 13" |
| 2 | Aldo Ronconi (ITA) | Italy | + 1' 22" |
| 3 | Pierre Brambilla (ITA) | Italy | + 8' 01" |
| 4 | Pierre Cogan (FRA) | France - West | + 10' 56" |
| 5 | Fermo Camellini (ITA) | Netherlands/Strangers of France | + 12' 11" |
| 6 | Jean Robic (FRA) | France - West | + 15' 09" |
| 7 | Gottfried Weilenmann (SUI) | Switzerland/Luxembourg | + 23' 47" |
| 8 | Raymond Impanis (BEL) | Belgium | + 24' 29" |
| 9 | Briek Schotte (BEL) | Belgium | + 26' 23" |
| 10 | Giuseppe Tacca (ITA) | Italy | + 27' 19" |

== Stage 5 ==
29 June 1947 — Strasbourg to Besançon, 248 km (154 mi)

Stage 5 result

| Rank | Rider | Team | Time |
|---|---|---|---|
| 1 | Ferdinand Kübler (SUI) | Switzerland/Luxembourg | 8h 10' 45" |
| 2 | Vincenzo Rossello (ITA) | Italy | s.t. |
| 3 | Robert Bonnaventure (FRA) | France - Île de France | s.t. |
| 4 | Florent Mathieu (BEL) | Belgium | s.t. |
| 5 | Leo Amberg (SUI) | Switzerland/Luxembourg | + 1' 01" |
| 6 | Eloi Tassin (FRA) | France - West | s.t. |
| 7 | Primo Volpi (ITA) | Italy | + 1' 31" |
| 8 | Roger Lévêque (FRA) | France - Centre/South-West | s.t. |
| 9 | Raymond Impanis (BEL) | Belgium | s.t. |
| 10 | Raymond Lucas (FRA) | France - Île de France | s.t. |

General classification after stage 5

| Rank | Rider | Team | Time |
|---|---|---|---|
| 1 | René Vietto (FRA) | France | 39h 36' 01" |
| 2 | Aldo Ronconi (ITA) | Italy | + 1' 22" |
| 3 | Pierre Brambilla (ITA) | Italy | + 8' 01" |
| 4 | Pierre Cogan (FRA) | France - West | + 10' 56" |
| 5 | Fermo Camellini (ITA) | Netherlands/Strangers of France | + 12' 11" |
| 6 | Jean Robic (FRA) | France - West | + 15' 09" |
| 7 | Gottfried Weilenmann (SUI) | Switzerland/Luxembourg | + 23' 47" |
| 8 | Raymond Impanis (BEL) | Belgium | + 23' 57" |
| 9 | Briek Schotte (BEL) | Belgium | + 26' 23" |
| 10 | Giuseppe Tacca (ITA) | Italy | + 27' 19" |

== Stage 6 ==
30 June 1947 — Besançon to Lyon, 249 km (155 mi)

Stage 6 result

| Rank | Rider | Team | Time |
|---|---|---|---|
| 1 | Lucien Teisseire (FRA) | France | 6h 55' 37" |
| 2 | Édouard Fachleitner (FRA) | France | s.t. |
| 3 | Albert Bourlon (FRA) | France - Centre/South-West | s.t. |
| 4 | Bernard Gauthier (FRA) | France - South-East | + 43" |
| 5 | Gaston Audier (FRA) | France - North-East | + 13' 57" |
| 6 | Émile Idée (FRA) | France | + 17' 17" |
| 7 | Eloi Tassin (FRA) | France - West | s.t. |
| 8 | Joseph Dessertine (FRA) | France - Centre/South-West | s.t. |
| 9 | Maurice Mollin (BEL) | Belgium | s.t. |
| 10 | Edward Klabiński (POL) | Netherlands/Strangers of France | s.t. |

General classification after stage 6

| Rank | Rider | Team | Time |
|---|---|---|---|
| 1 | René Vietto (FRA) | France | 46h 49' 21" |
| 2 | Aldo Ronconi (ITA) | Italy | + 1' 22" |
| 3 | Pierre Brambilla (ITA) | Italy | + 8' 01" |
| 4 | Pierre Cogan (FRA) | France - West | + 10' 56" |
| 5 | Fermo Camellini (ITA) | Netherlands/Strangers of France | + 12' 11" |
| 6 | Jean Robic (FRA) | France - West | + 15' 09" |
| 7 | Édouard Fachleitner (FRA) | France | + 23' 47" |
| 8 | Gottfried Weilenmann (SUI) | Switzerland/Luxembourg | + 23' 47" |
| 9 | Raymond Impanis (BEL) | Belgium | + 23' 57" |
| 10 | Briek Schotte (BEL) | Belgium | + 26' 23" |

== Stage 7 ==
2 July 1947 — Lyon to Grenoble, 172 km (107 mi)

Stage 7 result

| Rank | Rider | Team | Time |
|---|---|---|---|
| 1 | Jean Robic (FRA) | France - West | 5h 29' 46" |
| 2 | Pierre Brambilla (ITA) | Italy | + 4' 36" |
| 3 | Édouard Fachleitner (FRA) | France | s.t. |
| 4 | Aldo Ronconi (ITA) | Italy | + 5' 48" |
| 5 | Raymond Impanis (BEL) | Belgium | + 7' 43" |
| 6 | Giordano Cottur (ITA) | Italy | + 8' 05" |
| 7 | René Vietto (FRA) | France | + 8' 24" |
| 8 | Paul Giguet (FRA) | France - South-East | s.t. |
| 9 | Vincenzo Rossello (ITA) | Italy | s.t. |
| 10 | Pierre Cogan (FRA) | France - West | + 9' 29" |

General classification after stage 7

| Rank | Rider | Team | Time |
|---|---|---|---|
| 1 | Aldo Ronconi (ITA) | Italy | 52h 26' 02" |
| 2 | René Vietto (FRA) | France | + 1' 29" |
| 3 | Pierre Brambilla (ITA) MG | Italy | + 4' 12" |
| 4 | Jean Robic (FRA) | France - West | + 7' 14" |
| 5 | Pierre Cogan (FRA) | France - West | + 13' 30" |
| 6 | Fermo Camellini (ITA) | Netherlands/Strangers of France | + 17' 45" |
| 7 | Édouard Fachleitner (FRA) | France | + 18' 29" |
| 8 | Raymond Impanis (BEL) | Belgium | + 24' 45" |
| 9 | Gottfried Weilenmann (SUI) | Switzerland/Luxembourg | + 28' 29" |
| 10 | Briek Schotte (BEL) | Belgium | + 28' 57" |

== Stage 8 ==
3 July 1947 — Grenoble to Briançon, 185 km (115 mi)

Stage 8 result

| Rank | Rider | Team | Time |
|---|---|---|---|
| 1 | Fermo Camellini (ITA) | Netherlands/Strangers of France | 6h 49' 07" |
| 2 | Pierre Brambilla (ITA) MG | Italy | + 8' 06" |
| 3 | Apo Lazaridès (FRA) | France - South-East | + 8' 08" |
| 4 | Giordano Cottur (ITA) | Italy | + 10' 35" |
| 5 | Aldo Ronconi (ITA) | Italy | s.t. |
| 6 | Jean-Marie Goasmat (FRA) | France - West | s.t. |
| 7 | René Vietto (FRA) | France | s.t. |
| 8 | Édouard Fachleitner (FRA) | France | s.t. |
| 9 | Vincenzo Rossello (ITA) | Italy | + 13' 42" |
| 10 | Giuseppe Tacca (ITA) | Italy | + 14' 01" |

General classification after stage 8

| Rank | Rider | Team | Time |
|---|---|---|---|
| 1 | Aldo Ronconi (ITA) | Italy | 59h 25' 44" |
| 2 | Pierre Brambilla (ITA) MG | Italy | + 1' 13" |
| 3 | René Vietto (FRA) | France | + 1' 29" |
| 4 | Fermo Camellini (ITA) | Netherlands/Strangers of France | + 3' 10" |
| 5 | Jean Robic (FRA) | France - West | + 13' 05" |
| 6 | Édouard Fachleitner (FRA) | France | + 18' 29" |
| 7 | Pierre Cogan (FRA) | France - West | + 19' 21" |
| 8 | Gottfried Weilenmann (SUI) | Switzerland/Luxembourg | + 34' 40" |
| 9 | Raymond Impanis (BEL) | Belgium | + 37' 14" |
| 10 | Giordano Cottur (ITA) | Italy | + 37' 20" |

== Stage 9 ==
5 July 1947 — Briançon to Digne, 217 km (135 mi)

Stage 9 result

| Rank | Rider | Team | Time |
|---|---|---|---|
| 1 | René Vietto (FRA) | France | 7h 23' 15" |
| 2 | Apo Lazaridès (FRA) | France - South-East | s.t. |
| 3 | Pierre Brambilla (ITA) MG | Italy | + 4' 20" |
| 4 | Jean Robic (FRA) | France - West | + 6' 34" |
| 5 | Lucien Teisseire (FRA) | France | s.t. |
| 6 | Édouard Fachleitner (FRA) | France | s.t. |
| 7 | Fermo Camellini (ITA) | Netherlands/Strangers of France | s.t. |
| 8 | Raymond Impanis (BEL) | Belgium | + 7' 43" |
| 9 | Aldo Ronconi (ITA) | Italy | s.t. |
| 10 | Paul Giguet (FRA) | France - South-East | s.t. |

General classification after stage 9

| Rank | Rider | Team | Time |
|---|---|---|---|
| 1 | René Vietto (FRA) | France | 66h 48' 28" |
| 2 | Pierre Brambilla (ITA) MG | Italy | + 5' 04" |
| 3 | Aldo Ronconi (ITA) | Italy | + 8' 14" |
| 4 | Fermo Camellini (ITA) | Netherlands/Strangers of France | + 10' 15" |
| 5 | Jean Robic (FRA) | France - West | + 18' 10" |
| 6 | Édouard Fachleitner (FRA) | France | + 25' 34" |
| 7 | Raymond Impanis (BEL) | Belgium | + 45' 28" |
| 8 | Giordano Cottur (ITA) | Italy | + 58' 05" |
| 9 | Apo Lazaridès (FRA) | France - South-East | + 58' 34" |
| 10 | Pierre Cogan (FRA) | France - West | + 1h 05' 35" |

== Stage 10 ==
6 July 1947 — Digne to Nice, 255 km (158 mi)

Stage 10 result

| Rank | Rider | Team | Time |
|---|---|---|---|
| 1 | Fermo Camellini (ITA) | Netherlands/Strangers of France | 8h 07' 59" |
| 2 | Aldo Ronconi (ITA) | Italy | + 2' 00" |
| 3 | Apo Lazaridès (FRA) | France - South-East | + 2' 01" |
| 4 | Norbert Callens (BEL) | Belgium | + 2' 14" |
| 5 | Giuseppe Tacca (ITA) | Italy | + 4' 19" |
| 6 | Daniel Thuayre (FRA) | France - Île de France | s.t. |
| 7 | Jean-Marie Goasmat (FRA) | France - West | s.t. |
| 8 | Pierre Brambilla (ITA) MG | Italy | s.t. |
| 9 | René Vietto (FRA) | France | + 6' 19" |
| 10 | Édouard Fachleitner (FRA) | France | s.t. |

General classification after stage 10

| Rank | Rider | Team | Time |
|---|---|---|---|
| 1 | René Vietto (FRA) | France | 75h 02' 46" |
| 2 | Fermo Camellini (ITA) | Netherlands/Strangers of France | + 2' 11" |
| 3 | Pierre Brambilla (ITA) | Italy | + 3' 04" |
| 4 | Aldo Ronconi (ITA) | Italy | + 3' 25" |
| 5 | Jean Robic (FRA) | France - West | + 25' 05" |
| 6 | Édouard Fachleitner (FRA) | France | + 25' 34" |
| 7 | Raymond Impanis (BEL) | Belgium | + 48' 22" |
| 8 | Apo Lazaridès (FRA) MG | France - South-East | + 53' 31" |
| 9 | Giordano Cottur (ITA) | Italy | + 1h 07' 18" |
| 10 | Jean-Marie Goasmat (FRA) | France - West | + 1h 07' 44" |

== Stage 11 ==
7 July 1947 — Nice to Marseille, 230 km (140 mi)

Stage 11 result

| Rank | Rider | Team | Time |
|---|---|---|---|
| 1 | Édouard Fachleitner (FRA) | France | 6h 31' 00" |
| 2 | Raoul Rémy (FRA) | France - South-East | + 8' 35" |
| 3 | Marius Bonnet (FRA) | France - South-East | + 15' 17" |
| 4 | Jean Goldschmit (LUX) | Switzerland/Luxembourg | + 15' 42" |
| 5 | Jean-Marie Goasmat (FRA) | France - West | s.t. |
| 6 | Pascal Gnazzo (FRA) | France - South-East | + 16' 10" |
| 7 | Paul Giguet (FRA) | France - South-East | s.t. |
| 8 | Joseph Neri (FRA) | France - Centre/South-West | s.t. |
| 9 | Jean Robic (FRA) | France - West | + 16' 42" |
| 10 | Maurice Mollin (BEL) | Belgium | + 16' 51" |

General classification after stage 11

| Rank | Rider | Team | Time |
|---|---|---|---|
| 1 | René Vietto (FRA) | France | 81h 52' 12" |
| 2 | Fermo Camellini (ITA) | Netherlands/Strangers of France | + 2' 11" |
| 3 | Pierre Brambilla (ITA) | Italy | + 3' 04" |
| 4 | Aldo Ronconi (ITA) | Italy | + 3' 25" |
| 5 | Édouard Fachleitner (FRA) | France | + 6' 16" |
| 6 | Jean Robic (FRA) | France - West | + 23' 21" |
| 7 | Raymond Impanis (BEL) | Belgium | + 48' 22" |
| 8 | Apo Lazaridès (FRA) MG | France - South-East | + 53' 31" |
| 9 | Jean-Marie Goasmat (FRA) | France - West | + 1h 05' 00" |
| 10 | Giordano Cottur (ITA) | Italy | + 1h 07' 18" |
