= 1947 Tour de France, Stage 12 to Stage 21 =

Cycling race stages

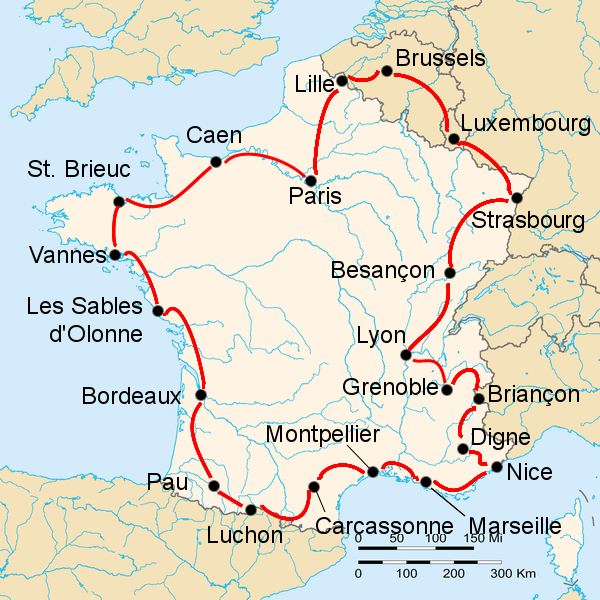
Route of the 1947 Tour de France

The 1947 Tour de France was the 34th edition of Tour de France, one of cycling's Grand Tours. The Tour began in Paris with a flat stage on 25 June, and Stage 12 occurred on 8 July with a flat stage from Marseille. The race finished in Paris on 20 July.

== Classification standings ==
Legend (Note: Jerseys appearing in the table on the left of the page indicate those worn by the cyclist during the particular stage, while those appearing in the table on the right of the page indicate those awarded to the cyclist after the stage.)
A yellow jersey	Denotes the leader of the general classification	MG	Denotes the leader of the mountains classification (Note: No jersey was awarded to the leader of the mountains classification until a white jersey with red polka dots was introduced in 1975.) (meilleur grimpeur)
	s.t. indicates that the rider was credited with the same time as the one directly above him.		

== Stage 12 ==
8 July 1947 — Marseille to Montpellier, 165 km (103 mi)

Stage 12 result

Rank	Rider	Team	Time
1	Henri Massal (FRA)	France	4h 57' 40"
2	Bim Diederich (LUX)	Switzerland/Luxembourg	s.t.
3	Édouard Muller (FRA)	France - Île de France	s.t.
4	Alexandre Pawlisiak (FRA)	France - North-East	s.t.
5	Vincenzo Rossello (ITA)	Italy	s.t.
6	Roger Gyselinck (BEL)	Belgium	s.t.
7	Bernard Gauthier (FRA)	France - South-East	s.t.
8	Albert Bourlon (FRA)	France - Centre/South-West	s.t.
9	Raymond Lucas (FRA)	France - Île de France	s.t.
10	René Oreel (BEL)	Belgium	+ 6"

General classification after stage 12

Rank	Rider	Team	Time
1	René Vietto (FRA)	France	86h 58' 42"
2	Fermo Camellini (ITA)	Netherlands/Strangers of France	+ 2' 11"
3	Pierre Brambilla (ITA)	Italy	+ 3' 04"
4	Aldo Ronconi (ITA)	Italy	+ 3' 25"
5	Édouard Fachleitner (FRA)	France	+ 6' 16"
6	Jean Robic (FRA)	France - West	+ 23' 21"
7	Raymond Impanis (BEL)	Belgium	+ 48' 22"
8	Apo Lazaridès (FRA) MG	France - South-East	+ 53' 31"
9	Jean-Marie Goasmat (FRA)	France - West	+ 1h 05' 00"
10	Giordano Cottur (ITA)	Italy	+ 1h 07' 18"

== Stage 13 ==
10 July 1947 — Montpellier to Carcassonne, 172 km (107 mi)

Stage 13 result

Rank	Rider	Team	Time
1	Lucien Teisseire (FRA)	France	5h 18' 35"
2	Norbert Callens (BEL)	Belgium	s.t.
3	Raymond Impanis (BEL)	Belgium	s.t.
4	Briek Schotte (BEL)	Belgium	s.t.
5	Florent Mathieu (BEL)	Belgium	+ 15"
6	Roger Lévêque (FRA)	France - Centre/South-West	s.t.
7	Henri Massal (FRA)	France	+ 1' 07"
8	Pietro Tarchini (SUI)	Switzerland/Luxembourg	+ 3' 21"
9	Antoine Latorre (FRA)	France - Centre/South-West	s.t.
10	Raymond Lucas (FRA)	France - Île de France	+ 11' 11"

General classification after stage 13

Rank	Rider	Team	Time
1	René Vietto (FRA)	France	92h 30' 00"
2	Fermo Camellini (ITA)	Netherlands/Strangers of France	+ 2' 11"
3	Pierre Brambilla (ITA)	Italy	+ 3' 04"
4	Aldo Ronconi (ITA)	Italy	+ 3' 25"
5	Édouard Fachleitner (FRA)	France	+ 6' 16"
6	Jean Robic (FRA)	France - West	+ 23' 21"
7	Raymond Impanis (BEL)	Belgium	+ 35' 39"
8	Jean-Marie Goasmat (FRA)	France - West	+ 1h 05' 00"
9	Apo Lazaridès (FRA) MG	France - South-East	+ 1h 06' 15"
10	Giordano Cottur (ITA)	Italy	+ 1h 07' 18"

== Stage 14 ==
11 July 1947 — Carcassonne to Luchon, 253 km (157 mi)

Stage 14 result

Rank	Rider	Team	Time
1	Albert Bourlon (FRA)	France - Centre/South-West	8h 10' 11"
2	Norbert Callens (BEL)	Belgium	+ 16' 20"
3	Giordano Cottur (ITA)	Italy	+ 16' 31"
4	Giuseppe Tacca (ITA)	Italy	+ 18' 52"
5	Jean-Marie Goasmat (FRA)	France - West	+ 18' 54"
6	Jean Robic (FRA)	France - West	+ 22' 32"
7	Lucien Teisseire (FRA)	France	s.t.
8	Paul Giguet (FRA)	France - South-East	s.t.
9	Gottfried Weilenmann (SUI)	Switzerland/Luxembourg	s.t.
10	Marius Bonnet (FRA)	France - South-East	s.t.

General classification after stage 14

Rank	Rider	Team	Time
1	René Vietto (FRA)	France	101h 02' 43"
2	Fermo Camellini (ITA)	Netherlands/Strangers of France	+ 2' 11"
3	Pierre Brambilla (ITA)	Italy	+ 3' 04"
4	Aldo Ronconi (ITA)	Italy	+ 3' 25"
5	Édouard Fachleitner (FRA)	France	+ 6' 16"
6	Jean Robic (FRA)	France - West	+ 23' 21"
7	Raymond Impanis (BEL)	Belgium	+ 35' 39"
8	Giordano Cottur (ITA)	Italy	+ 1h 01' 17"
9	Jean-Marie Goasmat (FRA)	France - West	+ 1h 01' 22"
10	Apo Lazaridès (FRA) MG	France - South-East	+ 1h 06' 15"

== Stage 15 ==
13 July 1947 — Luchon to Pau, 195 km (121 mi)

Stage 15 result

Rank	Rider	Team	Time
1	Jean Robic (FRA)	France - West	6h 46' 11"
2	René Vietto (FRA)	France	+ 10' 43"
3	Aldo Ronconi (ITA)	Italy	s.t.
4	Édouard Fachleitner (FRA)	France	s.t.
5	Pierre Brambilla (ITA)	Italy	s.t.
6	Jean Goldschmit (LUX)	Switzerland/Luxembourg	s.t.
7	Apo Lazaridès (FRA) MG	France - South-East	+ 10' 54"
8	Raymond Impanis (BEL)	Belgium	+ 18' 41"
9	Lucien Teisseire (FRA)	France	+ 22' 09"
10	Primo Volpi (ITA)	Italy	+ 22' 17"

General classification after stage 15

Rank	Rider	Team	Time
1	René Vietto (FRA)	France	107h 59' 07"
2	Pierre Brambilla (ITA) MG	Italy	+ 1' 34"
3	Aldo Ronconi (ITA)	Italy	+ 3' 55"
4	Édouard Fachleitner (FRA)	France	+ 6' 46"
5	Jean Robic (FRA)	France - West	+ 8' 08"
6	Fermo Camellini (ITA)	Netherlands/Strangers of France	+ 14' 46"
7	Raymond Impanis (BEL)	Belgium	+ 43' 57"
8	Apo Lazaridès (FRA)	France - South-East	+ 1h 06' 56"
9	Jean-Marie Goasmat (FRA)	France - West	+ 1h 15' 28"
10	Giordano Cottur (ITA)	Italy	+ 1h 18' 59"

== Stage 16 ==
14 July 1947 — Pau to Bordeaux, 195 km (121 mi)

Stage 16 result

Rank	Rider	Team	Time
1	Giuseppe Tacca (ITA)	Italy	5h 41' 39"
2	Maurice Mollin (BEL)	Belgium	s.t.
3	Alexandre Pawlisiak (FRA)	France - North-East	s.t.
4	Antoine Latorre (FRA)	France - Centre/South-West	s.t.
5	Jean-Marie Goasmat (FRA)	France - West	s.t.
6	Raoul Rémy (FRA)	France - South-East	s.t.
7	Victor Joly (BEL)	Netherlands/Strangers of France	s.t.
8	Florent Mathieu (BEL)	Belgium	s.t.
9	Pietro Tarchini (SUI)	Switzerland/Luxembourg	s.t.
10	Bernard Gauthier (FRA)	France - South-East	+ 30"

General classification after stage 16

Rank	Rider	Team	Time
1	René Vietto (FRA)	France	113h 44' 13"
2	Pierre Brambilla (ITA) MG	Italy	+ 1' 34"
3	Aldo Ronconi (ITA)	Italy	+ 3' 55"
4	Édouard Fachleitner (FRA)	France	+ 6' 46"
5	Jean Robic (FRA)	France - West	+ 8' 08"
6	Fermo Camellini (ITA)	Netherlands/Strangers of France	+ 14' 46"
7	Raymond Impanis (BEL)	Belgium	+ 43' 57"
8	Apo Lazaridès (FRA)	France - South-East	+ 1h 03' 59"
9	Jean-Marie Goasmat (FRA)	France - West	+ 1h 12' 01"
10	Giordano Cottur (ITA)	Italy	+ 1h 18' 59"

== Stage 17 ==
15 July 1947 — Bordeaux to Les Sables d'Olonne, 272 km (169 mi)

Stage 17 result

Rank	Rider	Team	Time
1	Eloi Tassin (FRA)	France - West	8h 59' 05"
2	Briek Schotte (BEL)	Belgium	+ 1' 10"
3	Pietro Tarchini (SUI)	Switzerland/Luxembourg	s.t.
4	Raymond Lucas (FRA)	France - Île de France	s.t.
5	Bernard Gauthier (FRA)	France - South-East	s.t.
6	Ange Le Strat (FRA)	France - West	s.t.
7	Edward Klabiński (POL)	Netherlands/Strangers of France	s.t.
8	Primo Volpi (ITA)	Italy	s.t.
9	Bim Diederich (LUX)	Switzerland/Luxembourg	s.t.
10	Raoul Rémy (FRA)	France - South-East	+ 3' 12"

General classification after stage 17

Rank	Rider	Team	Time
1	René Vietto (FRA)	France	122h 48' 03"
2	Pierre Brambilla (ITA) MG	Italy	+ 1' 34"
3	Aldo Ronconi (ITA)	Italy	+ 3' 55"
4	Édouard Fachleitner (FRA)	France	+ 6' 46"
5	Jean Robic (FRA)	France - West	+ 8' 08"
6	Fermo Camellini (ITA)	Netherlands/Strangers of France	+ 15' 16"
7	Raymond Impanis (BEL)	Belgium	+ 43' 57"
8	Apo Lazaridès (FRA)	France - South-East	+ 1h 03' 59"
9	Jean-Marie Goasmat (FRA)	France - West	+ 1h 12' 01"
10	Giordano Cottur (ITA)	Italy	+ 1h 18' 59"

== Stage 18 ==
16 July 1947 — Les Sables d'Olonne to Vannes, 236 km (147 mi)

Stage 18 result

Rank	Rider	Team	Time
1	Pietro Tarchini (SUI)	Switzerland/Luxembourg	7h 10' 07"
2	Paul Giguet (FRA)	France - South-East	s.t.
3	Gottfried Weilenmann (SUI)	Switzerland/Luxembourg	s.t.
4	Briek Schotte (BEL)	Belgium	s.t.
5	René Barret (FRA)	France - Île de France	s.t.
=6	Raoul Rémy (FRA)	France - South-East	s.t.
=6	Bim Diederich (LUX)	Switzerland/Luxembourg	s.t.
=6	Maurice Mollin (BEL)	Belgium	s.t.
=6	Jean-Marie Goasmat (FRA)	France - West	s.t.
=6	Roger Lévêque (FRA)	France - Centre/South-West	s.t.

General classification after stage 18

Rank	Rider	Team	Time
1	René Vietto (FRA)	France	130h 06' 29"
2	Pierre Brambilla (ITA) MG	Italy	+ 1' 34"
3	Aldo Ronconi (ITA)	Italy	+ 3' 55"
4	Édouard Fachleitner (FRA)	France	+ 6' 46"
5	Jean Robic (FRA)	France - West	+ 8' 08"
6	Fermo Camellini (ITA)	Netherlands/Strangers of France	+ 15' 16"
7	Raymond Impanis (BEL)	Belgium	+ 35' 38"
8	Jean-Marie Goasmat (FRA)	France - West	+ 1h 03' 42"
9	Apo Lazaridès (FRA)	France - South-East	+ 1h 03' 59"
10	Giordano Cottur (ITA)	Italy	+ 1h 13' 41"

== Stage 19 ==
17 July 1947 — Vannes to Saint-Brieuc, 139 km (86 mi) (ITT)

Stage 19 result

Rank	Rider	Team	Time
1	Raymond Impanis (BEL)	Belgium	3h 49' 36"
2	Jean Robic (FRA)	France - West	+ 4' 54"
3	Aldo Ronconi (ITA)	Italy	+ 6' 32"
4	Giordano Cottur (ITA)	Italy	+ 7' 11"
5	Pierre Brambilla (ITA) MG	Italy	+ 8' 00"
6	Fermo Camellini (ITA)	Netherlands/Strangers of France	+ 8' 19"
7	Primo Volpi (ITA)	Italy	+ 8' 40"
8	Édouard Fachleitner (FRA)	France	+ 9' 44"
9	Lucien Teisseire (FRA)	France	+ 10' 26"
10	Kléber Piot (FRA)	France	+ 10' 57"

General classification after stage 19

Rank	Rider	Team	Time
1	Pierre Brambilla (ITA) MG	Italy	134h 05' 39"
2	Aldo Ronconi (ITA)	Italy	+ 53"
3	Jean Robic (FRA)	France - West	+ 2' 58"
4	René Vietto (FRA)	France	+ 5' 06"
5	Édouard Fachleitner (FRA)	France	+ 6' 56"
6	Fermo Camellini (ITA)	Netherlands/Strangers of France	+ 14' 01"
7	Raymond Impanis (BEL)	Belgium	+ 25' 04"
8	Jean-Marie Goasmat (FRA)	France - West	+ 1h 05' 56"
9	Giordano Cottur (ITA)	Italy	+ 1h 11' 18"
10	Apo Lazaridès (FRA)	France - South-East	+ 1h 23' 59"

== Stage 20 ==
18 July 1947 — Saint-Brieuc to Caen, 235 km (146 mi)

Stage 20 result

Rank	Rider	Team	Time
1	Maurice Diot (FRA)	France - Île de France	6h 23' 37"
2	Maurice Mollin (BEL)	Belgium	s.t.
3	Édouard Muller (FRA)	France - Île de France	s.t.
4	Raymond Impanis (BEL)	Belgium	s.t.
5	Giordano Cottur (ITA)	Italy	s.t.
6	Edward Klabiński (POL)	Netherlands/Strangers of France	s.t.
7	Alexandre Pawlisiak (FRA)	France - North-East	s.t.
8	Victor Joly (BEL)	Netherlands/Strangers of France	s.t.
9	Apo Lazaridès (FRA)	France - South-East	s.t.
10	Bernard Gauthier (FRA)	France - South-East	+ 4' 50"

General classification after stage 20

Rank	Rider	Team	Time
1	Pierre Brambilla (ITA) MG	Italy	140h 44' 38"
2	Aldo Ronconi (ITA)	Italy	+ 53"
3	Jean Robic (FRA)	France - West	+ 2' 58"
4	René Vietto (FRA)	France	+ 5' 16"
5	Édouard Fachleitner (FRA)	France	+ 6' 56"
6	Raymond Impanis (BEL)	Belgium	+ 9' 42"
7	Fermo Camellini (ITA)	Netherlands/Strangers of France	+ 14' 01"
8	Giordano Cottur (ITA)	Italy	+ 55' 56"
9	Jean-Marie Goasmat (FRA)	France - West	+ 1h 05' 56"
10	Apo Lazaridès (FRA)	France - South-East	+ 1h 08' 37"

== Stage 21 ==
20 July 1947 — Caen to Paris, 257 km (160 mi)

Stage 21 result

Rank	Rider	Team	Time
1	Briek Schotte (BEL)	Belgium	7h 16' 13"
2	Bernard Gauthier (FRA)	France - South-East	+ 1' 17"
3	Bim Diederich (LUX)	Switzerland/Luxembourg	+ 3' 41"
4	René Oreel (BEL)	Belgium	+ 5' 37"
5	Jeng Kirchen (LUX)	Switzerland/Luxembourg	s.t.
6	Lucien Teisseire (FRA)	France	+ 7' 36"
7	Édouard Muller (FRA)	France - Île de France	s.t.
8	Jean Robic (FRA)	France - West	s.t.
9	Édouard Fachleitner (FRA)	France	s.t.
10	Maurice Diot (FRA)	France - Île de France	+ 19' 06"

General classification after stage 21

Rank	Rider	Team	Time
1	Jean Robic (FRA)	France - West	148h 11' 25"
2	Édouard Fachleitner (FRA)	France	+ 3' 58"
3	Pierre Brambilla (ITA) MG	Italy	+ 10' 07"
4	Aldo Ronconi (ITA)	Italy	+ 11' 00"
5	René Vietto (FRA)	France	+ 15' 23"
6	Raymond Impanis (BEL)	Belgium	+ 18' 14"
7	Fermo Camellini (ITA)	Netherlands/Strangers of France	+ 24' 08"
8	Giordano Cottur (ITA)	Italy	+ 1h 06' 03"
9	Jean-Marie Goasmat (FRA)	France - West	+ 1h 16' 03"
10	Apo Lazaridès (FRA)	France - South-East	+ 1h 18' 44"
