= Tour de France during World War II =

The Tour de France was not held during World War II because the organisers refused German requests. Although a 1940 Tour de France had been announced earlier, the outbreak of the war made it impossible for it to be held. After that, some attempts were made by the Germans during the war to have a Tour de France to maintain the sense of normality, but l'Auto, the organising newspaper, refused. Some other races were run as a replacement.

After World War II, l'Auto was closed for collaborating with the Germans. The rights to organise the Tour went to the French government. As two newspapers were interested in these rights, they each organised a small Tour of five stages; the race run by L'Équipe was considered the more successful, so L'Équipe was allowed to organise the 1947 Tour de France.

== History ==
Already before the war, the political situation in Europe had its influence on the Tour de France. Political reasons caused Italy, Germany and Spain to refuse to send teams to France for the 1939 Tour de France. The 1938 Tour de France winner, Gino Bartali, was among those affected. Henri Desgrange, the original race organizer, and Jacques Goddet, his deputy and replacement, (Note: Desgrange died on 16 August 1940 having abandoned his race the previous year while suffering the effects of an operation.) announced plans for a Tour de France in August 1940.

== Races planned or held during the Occupation ==
=== 1940 Tour de France ===
Henri Desgrange planned a Tour for 1940, after war had started but before France had been invaded. The route, approved by military authorities, included a route along the Maginot Line. Teams would have been drawn from military units in France, including the British, who would have been organised by a journalist, Bill Mills. The plans were dropped after the German invasion. The records and paperwork of the Tour were taken south to keep them safe but were never seen again. Desgrange died in August 1940, and his successor, Jacques Goddet, initially wanted to organise the Tour during the war, arguing that sport should remain neutral.

=== 1941 Tour de France ===
In 1941, the newspaper Paris-Soir, run by Germans, tried to persuade l'Auto to coorganize the Tour, but Goddet did not accept.

=== 1942 Tour de France ===
The German Propaganda Staffel wanted the Tour to be run and offered facilities otherwise denied, in the hope of maintaining a sense of normality. They offered to open the borders between German-occupied France in the north and the nominally independent Vichy France in the south, so that l'Auto could organize a Tour, together with La France Socialiste, but Goddet refused. He was, in any case, in little position to run a race of that scale because many of the staff had left L'Auto's office in Paris to go south.

=== 1942 Circuit de France ===
La France Socialiste, run by Jean Leulliot, Goddet's former colleague at L'Auto, did not have the same reluctance, and organized the race on its own. Leulliot, who had been manager of the French team that won the Tour in 1937, had become head of sport at La France Socialiste which, despite its name, was a right-wing paper that sympathized with the Germans. Leulliot assembled sixty-nine riders for the race, the Circuit de France, which ran from 28 September to 4 October 1942. Over six stages and 1,650 kilometres (1,030 mi), it went from Paris to Paris via Le Mans, Poitiers, Limoges, Clermont-Ferrand, St-Étienne, Lyon and Dijon.

One of the riders, Émile Idée, told the writer and cyclist Jean Bobet that he had been threatened with the Gestapo if he did not take part. Bobet said: "I asked him to repeat it to see if I had understood. I was stunned [dans la tête ça fait tilt]!"

The Circuit de France was organized between 28 September 1942 and 4 October 1942 by La France Socialiste in both the occupied zone and Vichy France, to give a feeling of nationality. The race had six multinational teams, and was won by François Neuville. The inexperience of the organizers, combined with bad weather and logistical problems, made the race a disaster. Although there were plans to hold the race again in 1943, it was never held.

Stage results
Stage	Route	Length	Winner
1	Paris – Le Mans	203 km (126 mi)	Guy Lapébie (FRA)
2	Le Mans – Poitiers	226 km (140 mi)	Frans Bonduel (BEL)
3A	Poitiers – Limoges	103 km (64 mi)	Georges Guillier (FRA)
3B	Limoges – Clermont-Ferrand	163 km (101 mi)	Louis Caput (FRA)
4	Clermont-Ferrand – Saint Étienne	203 km (126 mi)	François Neuville (BEL)
5A	Saint Étienne – Lyon	56 km (35 mi)	Genial-Lucifer (team time trial)
5B	Lyon – Dijon	203 km (126 mi)	Albert Goutal (FRA)
6	Dijon – Paris	358 km (222 mi)	Raymond Louviot (FRA)

Overall Classification (1–10)
Rank	Name	Time (Avg. Speed)
1	François Neuville (BEL)	45h 32' 09" (33.270 km/h)
2	Louis Thiétard (FRA)	+5' 23"
3	Louis Caput (FRA)	+5' 31"
4	Frans Bonduel (BEL)	+10' 26"
5	Léon Level (FRA)	+10' 54"
6	Albertin Disseaux (BEL)	+17' 10"
7	Raymond Louviot (FRA)	+19' 50"
8	Jean-Marie Goasmat (FRA)	+28' 16"
9	Emile Idée (FRA)	+34' 05"
10	Georges Guillier (FRA)	+44' 51"

The mountains classification was won by Pierre Brambilla.

=== 1943 Tour de France ===
The 1943 Tour de France was not held, but instead, L'Auto organized a readers' poll in 1943 to name the perfect team for a Tour de France, were one to be run. More than 10,000 took part.

=== 1943 Grand Prix du Tour de France ===
In 1943, l'Auto ran what it called the "Grand Prix du Tour de France", the paper's assessment of the greatest riders calculated using their placings in single-day races, all organised by l'Auto. At the end of the season, a yellow jersey was given to the cyclist with the best overall classification. The winner was Jo Goutorbe. Even though The Grand Prix du Tour de France was organized by Jacques Goddet, he made it clear that it was not an official Tour de France. The Grand Prix du Tour de France 1943 consisted of the following races:

- Paris–Roubaix
- GP de Provence
- Paris–Dijon
- Paris–Reims
- Paris–Tours
- Course dans Paris
- GP d'Auvergne
- GP des Alpes
- GP Industrie du Cycle

=== 1944 Grand Prix du Tour de France ===
In 1944, the Grand Prix du Tour de France was done again, but it was not completed because the liberation of France stopped the races from being run. Maurice De Simpelaere was the leader at the time the races were interrupted.

== Candidate Tours after liberation ==
After the liberation of France in 1944, L'Auto was closed and its belongings, including the Tour de France were sequestered by the state for having published articles too close to the Germans. All rights to the Tour were therefore owned by the government. Jacques Goddet was allowed to publish another daily sports paper, L'Équipe, but there was a rival candidate to run the Tour: a consortium of the magazines Sports and Miroir Sprint. Each organised a candidate race. L'Équipe and Le Parisien Libéré had "La Course du Tour de France", ("The Race of the Tour de France" – as close as they dared come to calling the race by its original name), and Sports and Miroir Sprint had "La Ronde de France". Both were five-stage races, the longest the government would allow because of shortages.

=== Ronde de France ===
From 10 to 14 July 1946, the Ronde de France was organized. The cyclists were divided in commercial teams, but the commercial teams were each allowed to field two teams, one composed of French cyclists and one of foreign cyclists. It was won by Giulio Bresci, who also won two stages and the mountains classification.

Stage results
Stage	Route	Length	Winner	Leader
1	Bordeaux – Pau	221 km (137 mi)	Elio Bertocchi (ITA)	Elio Bertocchi (ITA)
2	Pau – Toulouse	300 km (190 mi)	Giulio Bresci (ITA)	Giulio Bresci (ITA)
3	Toulouse – Montpellier	249 km (155 mi)	Raymond Louviot (FRA)	Giulio Bresci (ITA)
4	Montpellier – Gap	274 km (170 mi)	Giulio Bresci (ITA)	Giulio Bresci (ITA)
5	Gap – Grenoble	277 km (172 mi)	Apo Lazaridès (FRA)	Giulio Bresci (ITA)

Overall Classification (1–10)
Rank	Name	Time (Avg. Speed)
1	Giulio Bresci (ITA)	45h 32' 09" (32.026 km/h)
2	Ezio Bertocchi (ITA)	+4' 08"
3	Édouard Fachleitner (FRA)	+11' 24"
4	Pierre Cogan (FRA)	+14' 14"
5	Apo Lazaridès (FRA)	+26' 50"
6	Giuseppe Tacca (ITA)	+30' 48"
7	Augusto Introzzi (ITA)	+44' 13"
8	Pierre Brambilla (ITA)	+58' 42"
9	Maurice De Muer (FRA)	+1h 02' 29"
10	Petrus Van Verre (FRA)	+1h 10' 13"

=== La Course du Tour de France ===
The Course du Tour de France (English: Race of the Tour of France), also known as Monaco–Paris, was organised in 1946 by Le Parisien Libéré together with l'Équipe. The race had many things familiar to the old Tours de France: there were six national teams and five regional French teams, and the leader in the race was also given a yellow jersey. The race was won by French cyclist Apo Lazaridès. The mountains classification was won by Jean Robic.

Stage results
Stage	Route	Length	Winner	Leader
1	Monaco – Digne	185 km (115 mi)	Aldo Baito (ITA)	Aldo Baito (ITA)
2	Digne – Briançon	219 km (136 mi)	René Vietto (FRA)	René Vietto (FRA)
3	Briançon – Aix-les-Bains	263 km (163 mi)	Jean Robic (FRA)	Jean Robic (FRA)
4	Aix-les-Bains – Dijon	294 km (183 mi)	Adolfo Leoni (ITA)	Apo Lazaridès (FRA)
5	Dijon – Paris	355 km (221 mi)	Adolfo Leoni (ITA)	Apo Lazaridès (FRA)

Overall Classification (1–10)
Rank	Name	Time (Avg. Speed)
1	Apo Lazaridès (FRA)	44h 31' 42" (29.554 km/h)
2	René Vietto (FRA)	+37' 59"
3	Jean Robic (FRA)	+40' 25"
4	Lucien Teisseire (FRA)	+49' 58"
5	Emile Rol (FRA)	+52' 07"
6	Aldo Baito (ITA)	+54' 35"
7	Pierre Brambilla (ITA)	+57' 28"
8	Diego Marabelli (ITA)	+1h 00' 11"
9	Salvatore Crippa (ITA)	+1h 10' 59"
10	Auguste Mallet (FRA)	+1h 23' 53"

== Aftermath ==
The Course du Tour de France, L'Équipe's race, was better organised and appealed more to the public because it featured national teams which had been so successful before the war, when French cycling was at a high. In late 1946, both organisers intended to organise their race again in 1947, this time at the same time. The UCI then decided in December 1946 to give L'Équipe the right to organize the 1947 Tour de France. After their main rival Sports objected to this, the rights were instead given to La Societé du Parc du Princes, because this was thought to be a neutral choice. In early 1947, it became clear that the organisation of the Tour de France was difficult financially without a newspaper and, in June 1947, one month before the 1947 Tour de France would start, the Societé du Parc du Princes transferred the rights to L'Équipe.

Émile Besson, communist sports writer and a member of the Resistance from 1943 when he was 17, called L'Équipe's victory political. Besson, who was a member of the national study into French sport under the Occupation, set up by Marie-George Buffet when she was sports minister between 1997 and 2002, said:

It was a bit much to have given them the right to run the Tour again after all that [referring to L'Auto's pro-German attitude and closure]. Goddet had the keys to the Velodrome d'Hiver when [the Germans wanted it] in the round-up of Jews in July 1942. After the Liberation, the battle between Left and Right had the Tour as one of its prizes.

Goddet had to defend his wartime behaviour at an inquiry in Algiers. He pointed to the way he had allowed Resistance workers to print anti-German tracts at his newspaper and called Émilien Amaury in his defence. Amaury had a blameless record in the Resistance. He was also a right-wing businessman; his ideals close to Goddet's. It was with Amaury and his paper, Le Parisien Libéré, that Goddet ran La Course du Tour de France. It was Amaury's reputation that landed Goddet the Tour. That, says Besson, and because the rival candidate was two magazines with a communist background and President Charles de Gaulle was determined to limit communist influence. De Gaulle had spent much of his time during the war trying to prevent communist domination of the Resistance. Communists held many key positions in France just before and after Liberation but De Gaulle refused even to thank them for their work. Albert Bourlon, who won the 14th stage of the 1947 Tour de France, told Jean Bobet that he was convinced that his membership of the Communist Party denied him access to the race afterwards.

Amaury eventually took control of both the paper and the Tour de France, which the family still controls to this day with the family-owned Amaury Sport Organisation, since 2006 controlled by grandson Jean-Étienne Amaury.

Jean Leulliot was tried for his role in organising races under German patronage but he was cleared after fellow journalists, including Goddet, spoke in his favour.
