= 1944 Paris–Tours =

Race details
- Dates: 7 May 1944
- Stages: 1
- Distance: 253 km (157.2 mi)
- Winning time: 6h 06' 12"

Results
	Winner	Lucien Teisseire (FRA)
	Second	Louis Gauthier (FRA)
	Third	Louis Thiétard (FRA)

The 1944 Paris–Tours was the 38th edition of the Paris–Tours cycle race and was held on 7 May 1944. The race started in Paris and finished in Tours. The race was won by Lucien Teisseire.

== General classification ==
Final general classification

Rank	Rider	Time
1	Lucien Teisseire (FRA)	6h 06' 12"
2	Louis Gauthier (FRA)	+ 0"
3	Louis Thiétard (FRA)	+ 0"
4	Marcel Tiger (FRA)	+ 0"
5	Fermo Camellini (ITA)	+ 0"
6	Pierre Brambilla (ITA)	+ 0"
7	Antonin Rolland (FRA)	+ 0"
8	Albertin Disseaux (BEL)	+ 0"
9	Giuseppe Martino (ITA)	+ 0"
10	Ernest Sterckx (BEL)	+ 0"
