= Galliussi =

Galliussi is a surname. Notable people with the surname include:

- Emanuela Galliussi, Italian actress
- Eugenio Galliussi (1915–2010), Italian racing cyclist
