= 1946 Tour de Suisse =

Race details
- Dates: 13–20 July 1946
- Stages: 8
- Distance: 1,845 km (1,146 mi)
- Winning time: 54h 41' 07"

Results
	Winner	Gino Bartali (ITA)
	Second	Josef Wagner (SUI)
	Third	Aldo Ronconi (ITA)

The 1946 Tour de Suisse was the 10th edition of the Tour de Suisse cycle race and was held from 13 July to 20 July 1946. The race started and finished in Zürich. The race was won by Gino Bartali.

== General classification ==
Final general classification

Rank	Rider	Time
1	Gino Bartali (ITA)	54h 41' 07"
2	Josef Wagner (SUI)	+ 16' 30"
3	Aldo Ronconi (ITA)	+ 16' 38"
4	René Vietto (FRA)	+ 20' 11"
5	Norbert Callens (BEL)	+ 30' 58"
6	Jan Engels (BEL)	+ 43' 31"
7	Julián Berrendero (ESP)	+ 47' 31"
8	Ernst Näf (SUI)	+ 48' 45"
9	Robert Lang (SUI)	+ 48' 49"
10	Willy Kern (SUI)	+ 49' 00"
