= Berrini =

Berrini could refer to:

- Berrini (CPTM), a train station in São Paulo
- Joseph Berrini, an Italian-French racing cyclist
- Engenheiro Luís Carlos Berrini Avenue, street in São Paulo
- Diego Rodríguez (footballer, born 1989), full name: Diego Martín Rodríguez Berrini
