= Louis Bocquet =

French cyclist

Personal information
- Born: 25 February 1922 Francheville, Auvergne-Rhône-Alpes, France
- Died: 17 December 1973 (aged 51) Dreux, France

Cycling career
- Sport: Cycling
- Role: Rider

Professional teams
- 1946-1947: Peugeot-Dunlop
- 1948: La Perle-Hutchinson

Louis Bocquet (25 February 1922 – 17 December 1973) was a French racing cyclist. He competed in the 1947 Tour de France, riding for the team Peugeot-Dunlop.

He is the younger brother of Maurice Bocquet, also a professional rider.
