= Jean-Baptiste Delille =

French cyclist

Personal information
- Born: 24 December 1912 Haveluy, France
- Died: 6 July 1993 (aged 80) Bellaing, France

Cycling career
- Sport: Cycling
- Role: Rider

Jean-Baptiste Delille (24 December 1912 – 6 July 1993) was a French racing cyclist. He rode in the 1947 Tour de France.
