= Henri Ackermann =

Luxembourgish cyclist (1922–2014)

Personal information
- Born: 25 July 1922 Luxembourg City, Luxembourg
- Died: 23 January 2014 (aged 91) Luxembourg City, Luxembourg

Cycling career
- Sport: Cycling
- Role: Rider

Henri Ackermann (25 July 1922 – 23 January 2014) was a Luxembourgish racing cyclist. He rode in the 1947 and 1948 Tour de France.
