= Bouk Schellingerhoudt =

Dutch cyclist (1919–2010)

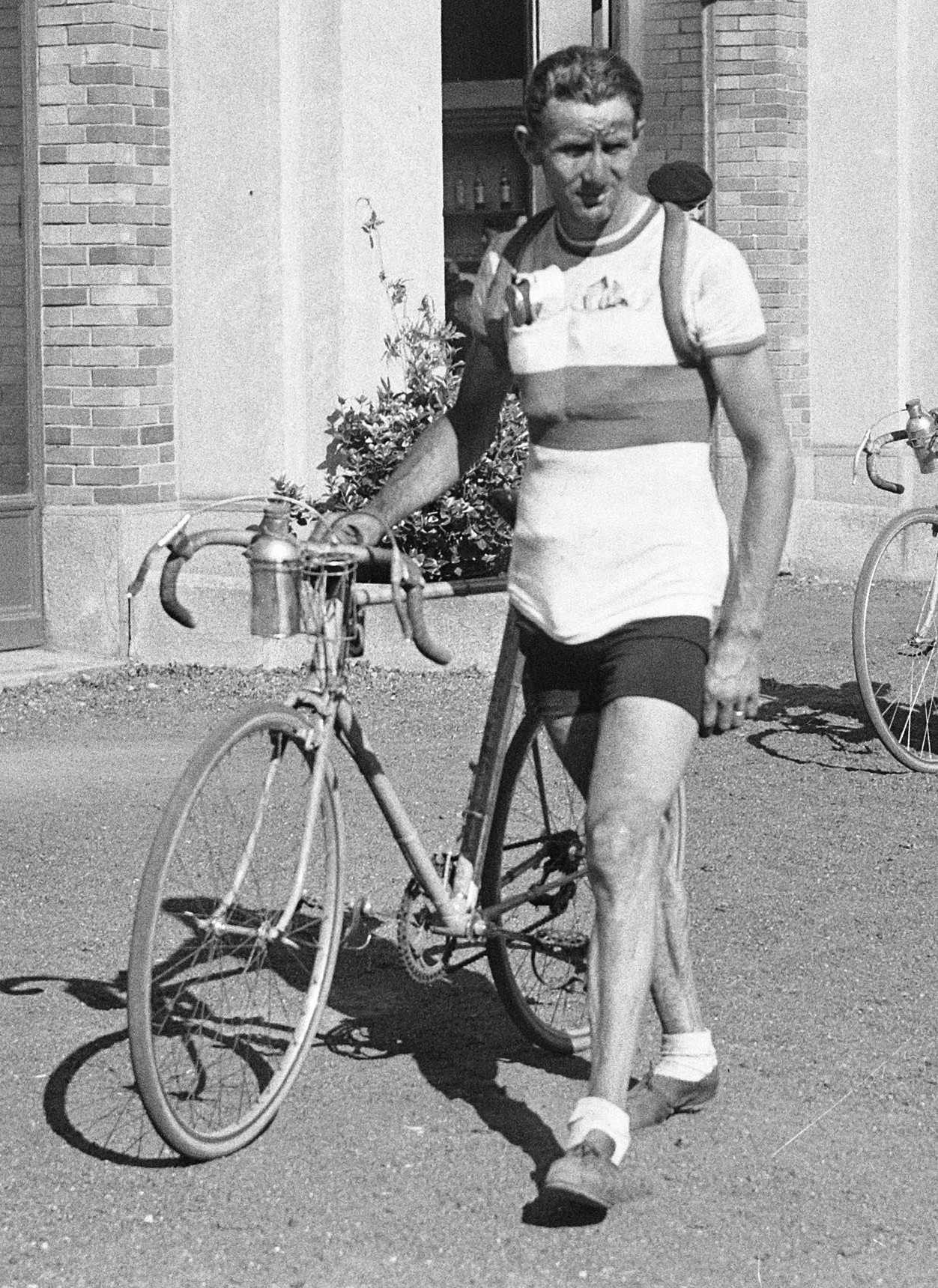
- Bouk Schellingerhoudt (1947)

Personal information
- Born: 4 May 1919 Zaandam, Netherlands
- Died: 19 September 2010 (aged 91) Zaandam, Netherlands

Cycling career
- Sport: Cycling
- Role: Rider

Bouk Schellingerhoudt (4 May 1919 – 19 September 2010) was a Dutch racing cyclist. He rode in the 1947 Tour de France.
