= Yves Pierracci =

French cyclist

Personal information
- Born: 26 July 1918 Salindres, France
- Died: 8 May 1983 (aged 64)

Cycling career
- Sport: Cycling
- Role: Rider

Yves Pierracci (26 July 1918 – 26 July 1983) was a French racing cyclist. He rode in the 1947 Tour de France.
