= Ahmed Chibane =

Algerian cyclist

Personal information
- Born: 3 March 1917 Algiers, Algeria

Cycling career
- Sport: Cycling
- Role: Rider

Ahmed Chibane (born 3 March 1917, date of death unknown) was an Algerian racing cyclist. He rode in the 1947 Tour de France.
