= Roger Pontet =

French cyclist

Personal information
- Born: 15 June 1920 Paris, France
- Died: 29 January 2009 (aged 88) Ploemeur, France

Cycling career
- Sport: Cycling
- Role: Rider

Roger Pontet (15 June 1920 – 29 January 2009) was a French racing cyclist. He rode in the 1947, 1948 and 1949 Tour de France.
