= Alfred Macorig =

Italian-French cyclist

Personal information
- Born: 8 December 1921 Dolegnano, Italy
- Died: 21 December 1996 (aged 75) Montargis, France

Cycling career
- Sport: Cycling
- Role: Rider

Alfred Macorig (8 December 1921 – 21 December 1996) was an Italian-French racing cyclist. He rode in the 1947 and 1948 Tour de France.
