= Pierre Fautrier =

French cyclist

Personal information
- Born: 30 January 1923 Marseille, France
- Died: 10 December 2014 (aged 91)

Cycling career
- Sport: Cycling
- Role: Rider

Pierre Fautrier (30 January 1923 – 10 December 2014) was a French racing cyclist. He rode in the 1947 Tour de France.
