= Robert Lang (cyclist) =

Swiss cyclist

Personal information
- Born: 5 August 1917 Pully, Switzerland
- Died: 16 August 1997 (aged 80) Schaffhausen, Switzerland

Cycling career
- Sport: Cycling
- Role: Rider

Robert Lang (5 August 1917 – 16 August 1997) was a Swiss racing cyclist. He rode in the 1947 Tour de France.
