= Robert Bonnaventure =

French cyclist

Personal information
- Born: 8 August 1920 Arc-lès-Gray, France
- Died: 24 January 2015 (aged 94)

Cycling career
- Sport: Cycling
- Role: Rider

Robert Bonnaventure (8 August 1920, Arc-les-Gray – 24 January 2015, Vernaison) was a French racing cyclist. He rode in the 1947 and 1948 Tour de France.

During World War II, he helped save two Jewish children, Lemel and Michel Martinsky. For this, he was recognised as Righteous Among Nations in 2016.
