= Gaston Rousseau =

French cyclist (1925–2019)

Personal information
- Full name: Gaston Rousseau
- Born: 14 July 1925 Biéville, Manche, France
- Died: 8 April 2019 (aged 93) Saint-Vigor-le-Grand, France

Cycling career
- Sport: Cycling
- Role: Rider

Gaston Rousseau (14 July 1925 – 8 April 2019) was a French racing cyclist. He raced in the 1947 Tour de France.
