= Eugenio Galliussi =

Italian cyclist

Personal information
- Born: 18 July 1915 Cividale del Friuli, Italy
- Died: 14 November 2010 (aged 95) Castelmaurou, France

Cycling career
- Sport: Cycling
- Role: Rider

Eugenio Galliussi (18 July 1915 – 14 November 2010) was an Italian racing cyclist. He rode in the 1947 Tour de France.
