= Manuel Huguet =

French cyclist

Personal information
- Born: 28 November 1918 Lherm, France
- Died: 18 April 1995 (aged 76) Cornebarrieu, France

Cycling career
- Sport: Cycling
- Role: Rider

Manuel Huguet (28 November 1918 – 18 April 1995) was a French racing cyclist. He rode in the 1947 Tour de France.
