= Joseph Dessertine =

French cyclist

Personal information
- Born: 4 October 1920 Jarnosse, France
- Died: 23 July 2005 (aged 84) Jarnosse, France

Cycling career
- Sport: Cycling
- Role: Rider

Joseph Dessertine (4 October 1920 – 23 July 2005) was a French racing cyclist. He rode in the 1947 Tour de France.
