= Joseph Berrini =

Italian-French cyclist

Personal information
- Born: 14 October 1918
- Died: 2005 (aged 86–87)

Cycling career
- Sport: Cycling
- Role: Rider

Joseph Berrini (14 October 1918 – 2005) was an Italian-French racing cyclist. He rode in the 1947 Tour de France.
