= Arie Vooren =

Dutch cyclist (1923–1988)

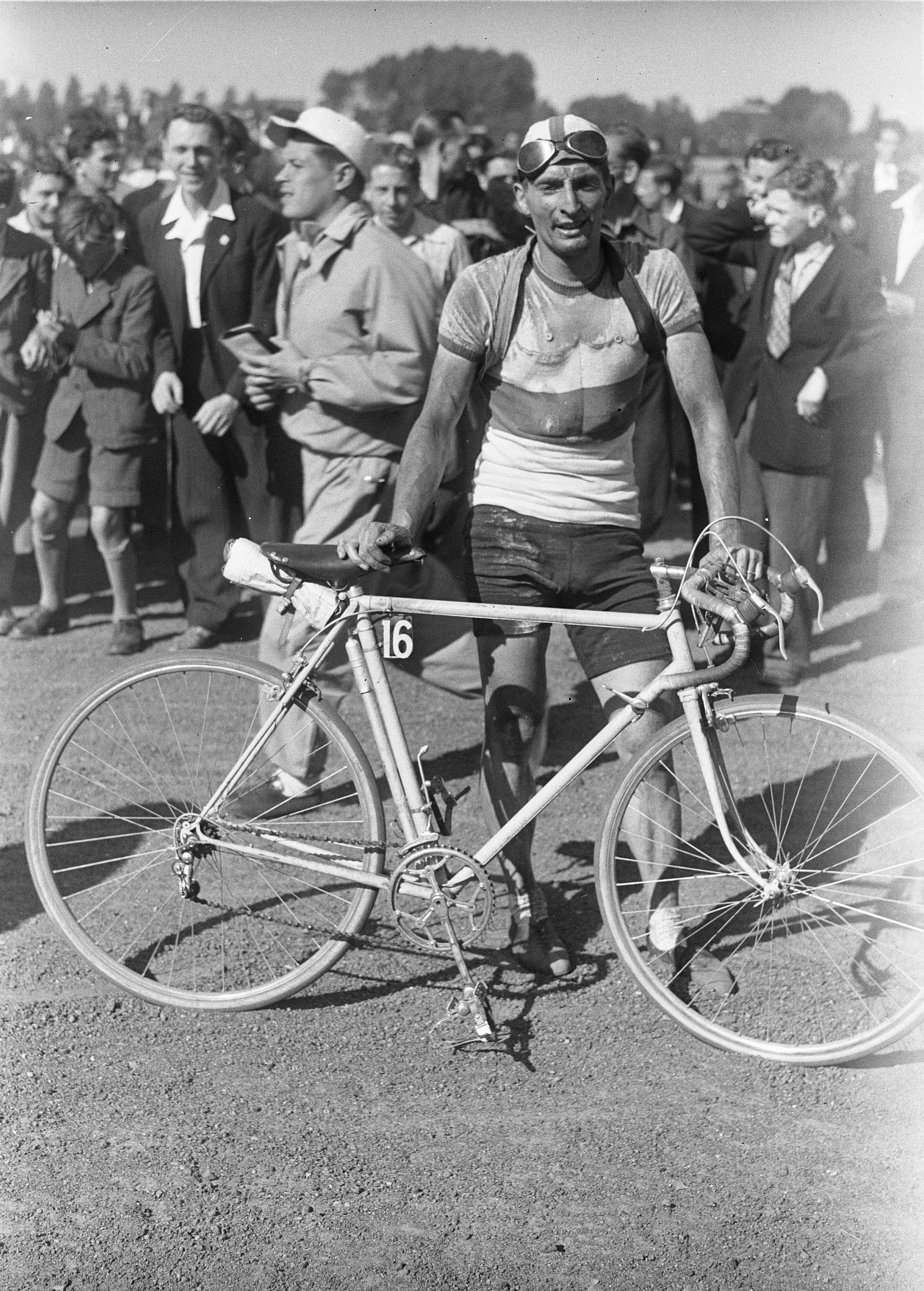
- Arie Vooren at the 1947 Tour de France

Personal information
- Born: 11 January 1923 Beverwijk, Netherlands
- Died: 3 June 1988 (aged 65) Cuneo, Italy

Cycling career
- Sport: Cycling
- Role: Rider

Arie Vooren (11 January 1923 – 3 June 1988) was a Dutch racing cyclist. He rode in the 1947 Tour de France.
