= Leo Weilenmann =

Swiss cyclist (1922–1999)

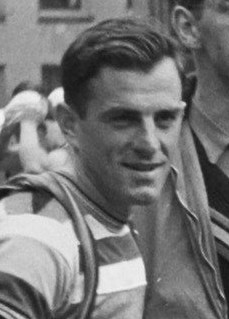
- Leo Weilenmann (1952)

Personal information
- Full name: Leo Weilenmann
- Born: 29 September 1922 Zürich, Switzerland
- Died: 6 January 1999 (aged 76) Zürich, Switzerland

Cycling career
- Sport: Cycling
- Role: Rider

Leo Weilenmann (29 September 1922 – 6 January 1999) was a Swiss racing cyclist. He raced in the 1947 and 1951 Tour de France.
