= Louis Gauthier =

French cyclist

Personal information
- Born: 12 April 1916 Blanzy, France
- Died: 6 August 2005 (aged 89) Autun, France

Cycling career
- Sport: Cycling
- Role: Rider

Louis Gauthier (12 April 1916 – 6 August 2005) was a French racing cyclist. He rode in the 1947 Tour de France. He finished in second place in the 1946 Paris–Roubaix.
