= Henri Massal =

French cyclist

Personal information
- Full name: Henri Massal
- Born: 1 May 1921 Montblanc, France
- Died: 11 August 2009 (aged 88)

Cycling career
- Sport: Cycling
- Discipline: Road
- Role: Rider

Major wins
- GP du Midi-Libre (1949)

Henri Massal (1 May 1921 – 11 August 2009) was a French professional road bicycle racer. Massal was the first winner of the GP du Midi Libre. He also won one stage in the 1947 Tour de France.

== Major results ==
1947
Tour de France:

Winner stage 12

1949
Grand Prix du Midi Libre
