= Joseph Neri =

French cyclist

Personal information
- Born: 26 July 1914 Cannes, France
- Died: 11 October 2005 (aged 91) Antibes, France

Cycling career
- Sport: Cycling
- Role: Rider

Joseph Neri (26 July 1914 – 11 October 2005) was a French racing cyclist. He rode in the 1947 Tour de France.
