= Gaston Audier =

French cyclist

Personal information
- Full name: Gaston Audier
- Born: 27 February 1913 Souspierre, France
- Died: 17 June 2003 (aged 90)

Cycling career
- Sport: Cycling
- Role: Rider

Gaston Audier (27 February 1913 – 17 June 2003) was a French racing cyclist. He raced in the 1947 Tour de France.
