= Jean Breuer (cyclist, born 1919) =

Belgian cyclist

Personal information
- Born: 14 December 1919 Liège, Belgium
- Died: 6 November 1986 (aged 66) Liège, Belgium

Cycling career
- Sport: Cycling
- Role: Rider

Jean Breuer (14 December 1919 – 6 November 1986) was a Belgian racing cyclist. He rode in the 1947 and 1949 Tour de France.
