= Victor Joly =

Belgian cyclist

Personal information
- Full name: Victor Joly
- Born: 15 April 1923 Quévy-le-Petit, Belgium
- Died: 10 June 2000 (aged 77) Le Cannet, France

Cycling career
- Sport: Cycling
- Role: Rider

Victor Joly (15 April 1923 – 10 June 2000) was a Belgian racing cyclist. He rode in the 1947 and the 1948 Tour de France.
