= Ange Le Strat =

French cyclist

Personal information
- Born: 18 February 1918 Inguiniel, France
- Died: 8 December 1999 (aged 81) Morlaix, France

Cycling career
- Sport: Cycling
- Role: Rider

Ange Le Strat (18 February 1918 – 8 December 1999) was a French racing cyclist. He rode in the 1947 and 1949 Tour de France.
