= Pietro Tarchini =

Swiss cyclist

Personal information
- Full name: Pietro Tarchini
- Born: 29 September 1921 Balerna, Switzerland
- Died: 14 July 1999 (aged 77) Ponte Cremenaga, Switzerland

Cycling career
- Sport: Cycling
- Discipline: Road
- Role: Rider

Major wins
- 1 stage Tour de France

Pietro Tarchini (29 September 1921, Balerna – 14 July 1999, Ponte Cremenaga) was a Swiss professional road bicycle racer. Tarchini won the 18th stage of the 1947 Tour de France.

== Major results ==
1947
Tour des Quatre-Cantons
Tour de France:

Winner stage 18

1948
Tour des Quatre-Cantons
