= Roger Gyselinck =

Belgian cyclist

Personal information
- Full name: Roger Gyselinck
- Born: 17 September 1920 Wetteren, Belgium
- Died: 5 January 2002 (aged 81) Wetteren, Belgium

Cycling career
- Sport: Cycling
- Role: Rider

Roger Gyselinck (17 September 1920 – 5 January 2002) was a Belgian racing cyclist. He raced in the 1947 Tour de France and finished in tenth place in the 1948 Paris–Roubaix.
