= René Barret =

French cyclist

Personal information
- Born: 6 August 1922 Montreuil, Seine-Saint-Denis, France
- Died: 28 November 2009 (aged 87) Saint-Martin-du-Tertre, Yonne, France

Cycling career
- Sport: Cycling
- Role: Rider

Professional teams
- 1946: Dilecta-Wolber
- 1946: De Dion-Bouton
- 1947-1948: Alcyon-Dunlop
- 1949: Mareze-Hutchinson
- 1950: Vanoli-Dunlop
- 1950: Mervil-Dunlop

René Barret (6 August 1922 – 28 November 2009) was a French racing cyclist. He rode in the 1947 Tour de France. Another René Barret participated to 1913 Tour de France.
