= Pascal Gnazzo =

French cyclist (1920–2019)

Personal information
- Born: 5 November 1920 Marseille, France
- Died: 28 August 2019 (aged 98)

Cycling career
- Sport: Cycling
- Role: Rider

Pascal Gnazzo (5 November 1920 – 28 August 2019) was a French racing cyclist. He rode in the 1947 Tour de France.
