= Daniel Thuayre =

French cyclist

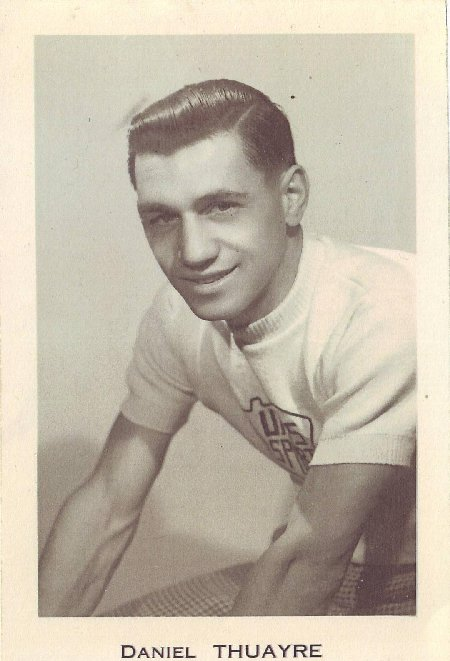

Personal information
- Born: 12 March 1924 Fontenay-aux-Roses, France
- Died: 12 November 1980 (aged 56) Clamart, France

Cycling career
- Sport: Cycling
- Role: Rider

Daniel Thuayre (12 March 1924 – 12 November 1980) was a French racing cyclist. He rode in the 1947 and 1948 Tour de France.
