= René Oreel =

Belgian cyclist

Personal information
- Born: 19 September 1922 Koolkerke, Belgium
- Died: 2 January 2010 (aged 87)

Cycling career
- Sport: Cycling
- Role: Rider

René Oreel (19 September 1922 – 2 January 2010) was a Belgian racing cyclist. He rode in the 1947 Tour de France.
