= Pierre Brambilla =

French cyclist (1919–1984)

Personal information
- Full name: Pierre Brambilla
- Nickname: La Brambille
- Born: 12 May 1919 Villarbeney, Switzerland
- Died: 13 February 1984 (aged 64) Grenoble, France

Cycling career
- Sport: Cycling
- Discipline: Road
- Role: Rider

Professional teams
- 1939: Terrot
- 1942: Tendil–Hutchinson
- 1944: Mercier–Hutchinson
- 1946–1949: Metropole–Dunlop
- 1950: Mervil
- 1951: Alcyon–Dunlop

Major wins
- Grand Tours Tour de France Mountains classification (1947) Vuelta a España 1 individual stage (1942)

Pierre Brambilla (12 May 1919 – 13 February 1984) was a French professional road cyclist. He was of Italian origin but adopted French nationality on 9 September 1949. He was known as "la Brambille" and he won the King of the Mountains competition in the 1947 Tour de France where he also finished third overall and wore the yellow jersey as leader of the general classification for two days. In that 1947 Tour, Brambilla was leading the race at the penultimate day, with Aldo Ronconi at 53 seconds and Jean Robic at 2'58". At the last stage, Caen-Paris, Robic and Édouard Fachleitner attacked, and finished more than 13 minutes before Brambilla, taking the first two places. Brambilla was the first cyclist to lose the lead in the Tour de France on the last stage. Brambilla is pictured in the short story "Brambilla" by Julian Barnes, published in his collection of short stories Cross Channel (1996).

== Major results ==
1939
Lyon–Grenoble–Lyon (with Giuseppe Martino)
1941
Montluçon
1942
Vuelta a España:

Winner stage 10

Mountains classification circuit de France
1943
Carcassonne
Circuit du Mont Ventoux
Course du Mont Chauve
GP d'Espéraza
GP Haute Savoie
Perpignan
1945
Annecy–Grenoble–Annecy
1946
Tour de l'Ouest
1947
Paris–Clermont-Ferrand
Tour de France:

Winner Mountains classification
3rd place overall classification
Wearing yellow jersey for two days

1949
Cahors
