= Marius Bonnet =

French cyclist

Personal information
- Born: 12 October 1921 Marseille, France
- Died: 26 July 2003 (aged 81) Marseille, France

Cycling career
- Sport: Cycling
- Role: Rider

Marius Bonnet (12 October 1921 – 26 July 2003) was a French racing cyclist. He rode in the 1947 and 1948 Tour de France.
