= Antoine Latorre =

French cyclist

Personal information
- Born: 1 August 1915 Bordeaux, France
- Died: 12 June 2001 (aged 85) Bordeaux, France

Cycling career
- Sport: Cycling
- Role: Rider

Antoine Latorre (1 August 1915 – 12 June 2001) was a French racing cyclist. He rode in the 1947 Tour de France.
