= Maurice Diot =

French cyclist (1922–1972)

Personal information
- Full name: Maurice Diot
- Nickname: le Teigneux
- Born: 13 June 1922 Paris, France
- Died: 4 March 1972 (aged 49) Migennes, France

Cycling career
- Sport: Cycling
- Discipline: Road
- Role: Rider

Major wins
- Paris–Brussels

Maurice Diot (13 June 1922 – 4 March 1972) was a French professional road bicycle racer. In 1951, he won the Paris–Brest–Paris race of 1200 km in a record time that has not been broken since. He rode in the 1947, 1948, and 1949 Tour de France. He also finished in second place in the 1950 Paris–Roubaix.

== Major results ==
1947
GP d'Espéraza
Tour de France:

Winner stage 20

1949
Paris–Brussels
1950
GP Catox
1951
GP de l'Echo d'Oran
Paris–Brest–Paris
1952
GP du Pneumatique
Montluçon
