= Raymond Lucas (cyclist) =

French cyclist

Personal information
- Full name: Raymond Lucas
- Born: 13 December 1918 Paris, France
- Died: 15 December 2006 (aged 88)

Cycling career
- Sport: Cycling
- Role: Rider

Raymond Lucas (13 December 1918 – 15 December 2006) was a French racing cyclist. Born in Paris (Ile-de-France), France on 13 December 1918. He started his career in the Tour de Picardie in 1939. He rode in the 1947 and 1949 Tour de France. He also rode in the La Fleche Wallone and Criterium National de la Route in 1949.
