= Florent Mathieu =

Belgian cyclist

- Mathieu in 1951

Personal information
- Born: 19 March 1919 Quaregnon, Belgium
- Died: 2 March 1999 (aged 79)

Cycling career
- Sport: Cycling
- Role: Rider

Florent Mathieu (19 March 1919 – 2 March 1999) was a Belgian racing cyclist. He rode in the 1947, 1948 and 1949 Tour de France.
