= Paul Giguet =

French cyclist

Personal information
- Born: 25 April 1915 Paris, France
- Died: 28 September 1993 (aged 78) Albertville, France

Cycling career
- Sport: Cycling
- Role: Rider

Paul Giguet (25 April 1915 – 28 September 1993) was a French racing cyclist. He rode in the 1947, 1948 and 1949 Tour de France.
