= Vincenzo Rossello =

Italian cyclist

Personal information
- Full name: Vincenzo Rossello
- Born: 16 February 1923 Stella San Bernardo, Italy
- Died: 20 January 1989 (aged 65) Alessandria, Italy

Cycling career
- Sport: Cycling
- Discipline: Road
- Role: Rider

Major wins
- 2 stages Tour de France

Vincenzo Rossello (16 February 1923 – 20 January 1989) was an Italian professional road bicycle racer from 1946 to 1957. He won two stages in the Tour de France.

== Major results ==
1948
Tour de France:

Winner stage 2

1949
Tour de France:

Winner stage 18

1951
Giro d'Italia:

9th place overall classification

1953
Giro d'Italia:

10th place overall classification
