= Alexandre Pawlisiak =

French cyclist

Personal information
- Full name: Alexandre Pawlisiak
- Born: 26 May 1913 Recklinghausen, Germany
- Died: 15 July 1990 (aged 77) Neuilly-sur-Seine, France

Cycling career
- Sport: Cycling
- Role: Rider

Alexandre Pawlisiak (26 May 1913 – 15 July 1990) was a French racing cyclist. He raced in the 1947 Tour de France.
