= Apo Lazaridès =

French cyclist

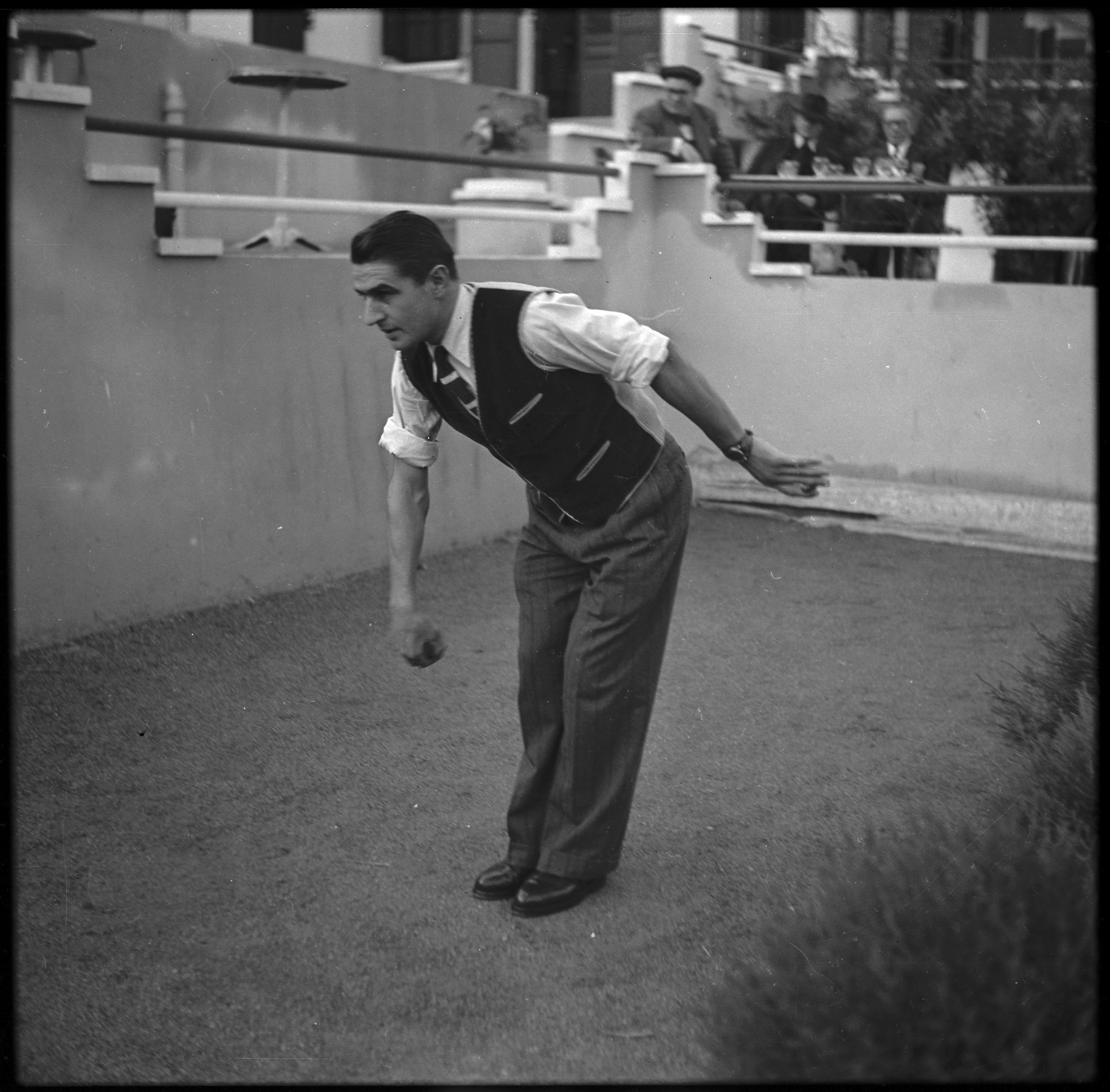

Personal information
- Full name: Jean-Apôtre Lazaridès
- Nickname: Apo
- Born: 16 October 1925 Marles-les-Mines, France
- Died: 30 October 1998 (aged 73) Cannes, France

Cycling career
- Sport: Cycling
- Discipline: Road
- Role: Rider
- Rider type: Climber

Major wins
- Silver medal 1948 World Championship
Medal record
Representing France
Men's road bicycle racing
World Championships
Silver medal – second place	1948 Valkenburg	Professional men's road race

Apo Lazaridès (16 October 1925 – 30 October 1998) was a French champion cyclist.

Born Jean-Apôtre Lazaridès in Marles-les-Mines, Pas-de-Calais of Greek ancestry (he became French in 1929). During the German military administration in occupied France during World War II, Lazaridès used his cycling to transport supplies to the French Resistance. Apo had an older brother, Lucien Lazaridès, also a cyclist.

Nicknamed "Apo", a short version of his middle name, he competed in races throughout France during the war. In 1946 Lazaridès finished fifth in the "Ronde de France", then won the most important competition of the year, the "La Course du Tour de France", a 1316 km race from Monaco to Paris. This was organised by the group who took charge of organisation of the Tour de France.

In the 1947 Tour, Lazaridès finished tenth but captured second overall in the mountain class. In 1948, he finished ninth and went on to take second place in the World Championship at Valkenburg, Netherlands. He retired in 1955 and moved to Cannes, where he was president of the Étoile Sportive de Cannes."

Lazaridès died in Cannes in 1998 and was buried there in the Cimetière du Grand Jas.

== Major results ==
1943
Boucles de Sospel
1946
Marseille-Nice
La Course du Tour de France
1947
Tour de France:

10th place overall classification

1948
Silver medal World Championships
1949
Polymultipliée
Tour de France:

9th place overall classification
