= Giuseppe Tacca =

Italian-French cyclist

Personal information
- Full name: Giuseppe Tacca
- Born: 12 August 1917 Cavaglio d'Agogna, Italy
- Died: 18 October 1984 (aged 67) Villepinte, France

Cycling career
- Sport: Cycling
- Discipline: Road
- Role: Rider

Major wins
- One stage 1947 Tour de France

Giuseppe Tacca (12 August 1917 – 18 October 1984) was an Italian-French professional road bicycle racer. He rode in the 1947, 1948 and 1949 Tour de France.

Italian by birth, he was naturalized French on 2 July 1948.

== Major results ==
1946
Circuit du Maine-Libre
1947
Tour de France:

Winner stage 16

1948
Paris-Nantes
1950
Circuit de Morbihan
