= Jean-Marie Goasmat =

French cyclist

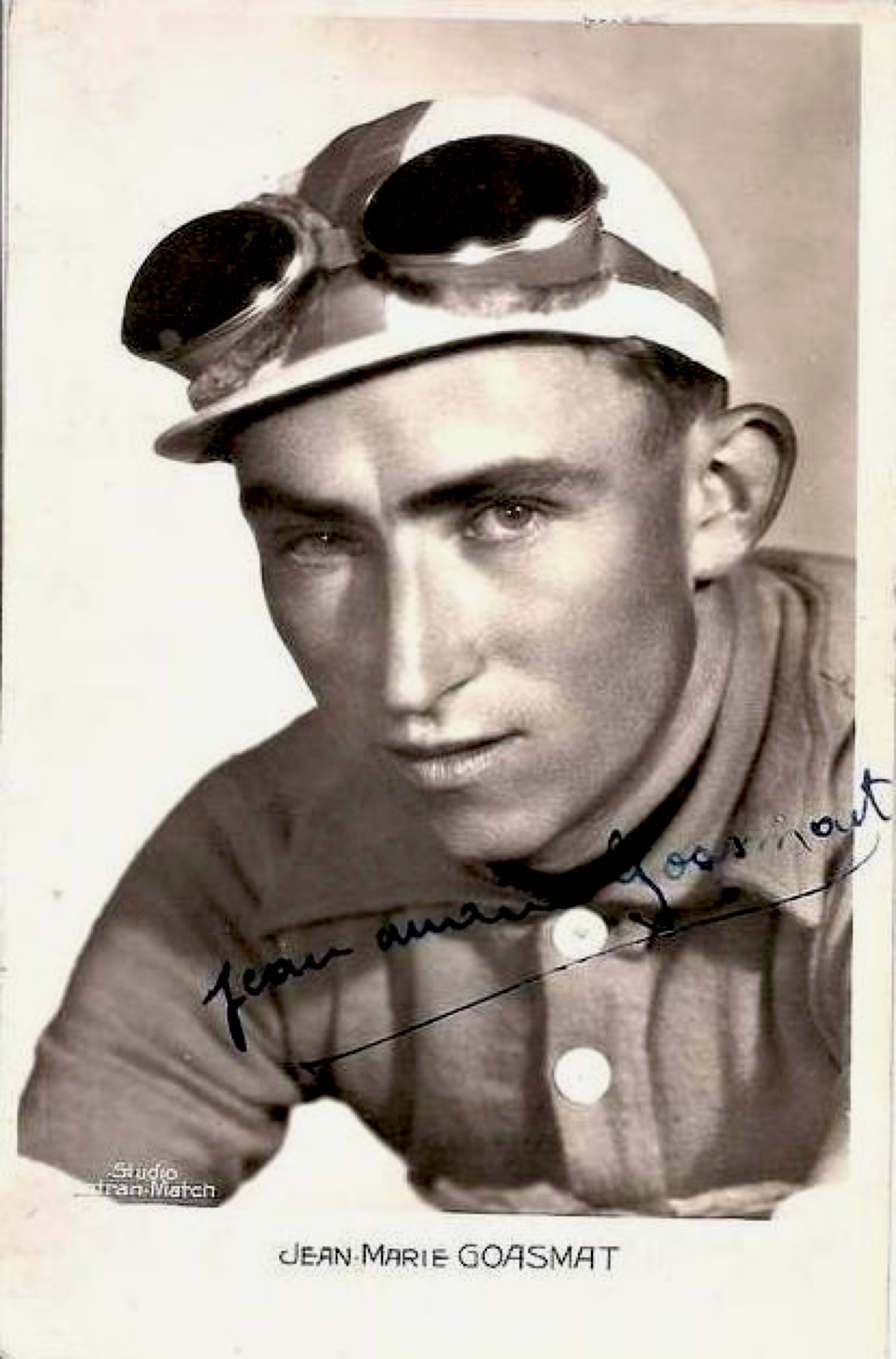

Personal information
- Full name: Jean-Marie Goasmat
- Nicknames: Ademaï le farfadet de Pluvigner
- Born: 28 March 1913 Camors, France
- Died: 21 January 2006 (aged 92) Vannes, France

Cycling career
- Sport: Cycling
- Discipline: Road
- Role: Rider

Major wins
- One stage 1936 Tour de France

Jean-Marie Goasmat (28 March 1913 in Camors — 21 January 2006 in Vannes) was a French professional road bicycle racer. Jean-Marie Goasmat was a brother of cyclist Joseph Goasmat.

== Major results ==
1934
Boucles de l'Aulne
1936
Tour de France:

Winner stage 8

1937
Circuit d'Auray
GP Ouest-France
Vire - Cherbourg - Vire
1938
Paris–Camembert
1941
Circuit d'Auray
Trophée des Grimpeurs
1942
Grand Prix des Nations
Trophée des Grimpeurs
1943
Circuit des villes d'eaux d'Auvergne
1945
Circuit Lyonnais
1947
Tour de France:

9th place overall classification

1951
Paris–Bourges
