= Albert Bourlon =

French cyclist (1916–2013)

Personal information
- Full name: Albert Bourlon
- Born: 23 November 1916 Sancergues, France
- Died: 16 October 2013 (aged 96)

Cycling career
- Sport: Cycling
- Discipline: Road
- Role: Rider

Major wins
- Paris–Bourges (1947); 1 stage 1947 Tour de France

Albert Bourlon (23 November 1916 – 16 October 2013) was a French professional road bicycle racer. He was born in Sancergues. In 1947, Bourlon won the 14th stage of the Tour de France. Almost immediately after the start, he broke away, and rode solo for 253 km (157 mi), the longest solo break in post-war Tour de France history.

== Major results ==
1947
Paris–Bourges
Tour de France:

Winner stage 14
