= Aldo Ronconi =

Italian cyclist

Personal information
- Full name: Aldo Ronconi
- Born: 20 September 1918 Brisighella, Italy
- Died: 12 June 2012 (aged 93) Faenza, Italy

Cycling career
- Sport: Cycling
- Discipline: Road
- Role: Rider

Professional teams
- 1940–1941: Legnano
- 1941: Viscontea
- 1942: SC Malatesta
- 1943–1944: Individual
- 1945: Viscontea
- 1946: Mondia
- 1946: Tebag
- 1946–1947: Benotto–Superga
- 1948: Bianchi
- 1949: Viscontea
- 1950: Heidemann
- 1950–1952: Benotto
- 1951: Vampire–Sterling

Major wins
- 1 stage Tour de France 1947; 1 stage Giro d'Italia 1946

Aldo Ronconi (20 September 1918 – 12 June 2012) was an Italian professional road bicycle racer.

Ronconi was born at Brisighella, Ravenna, Italy. He was professional from 1940 to 1952 where he won 5 victories. He finished fourth overall in his first Tour de France where he won a stage and wore the yellow jersey for 2 days. He also won a stage in the 1946 Giro d'Italia. He owned a bicycle goods and sports shop in Faenza, Italy, and died in Faenza, aged 93.

== Major results ==
1937
8th Giro dell'Appennino
1939
1st Overall Milano–Munchen

1st Stage 2

1940
1st Giro dell'Umbria
8th Giro dell'Emilia
10th Milan–San Remo
1942
7th Giro di Lombardia
10th Giro del Veneto
1946
1st Road race, National Road Championships
1st Giro di Toscana
3rd Overall Tour de Suisse
3rd Trofeo Matteotti
5th Overall Giro d'Italia

1st Stage 15

1947
2nd Gran Piemonte
3rd Giro di Romagna
4th Overall Tour de France

1st Stage 3
Held for two stages

5th Giro dell'Emilia
1949
2nd Overall Giro dei Tre Mari

1st Stages 2 & 6

3rd Giro di Romagna
1950
3rd Overall Tour de Suisse
5th Giro del Ticino
6th Giro di Romagna
