= Lucien Teisseire =

French cyclist

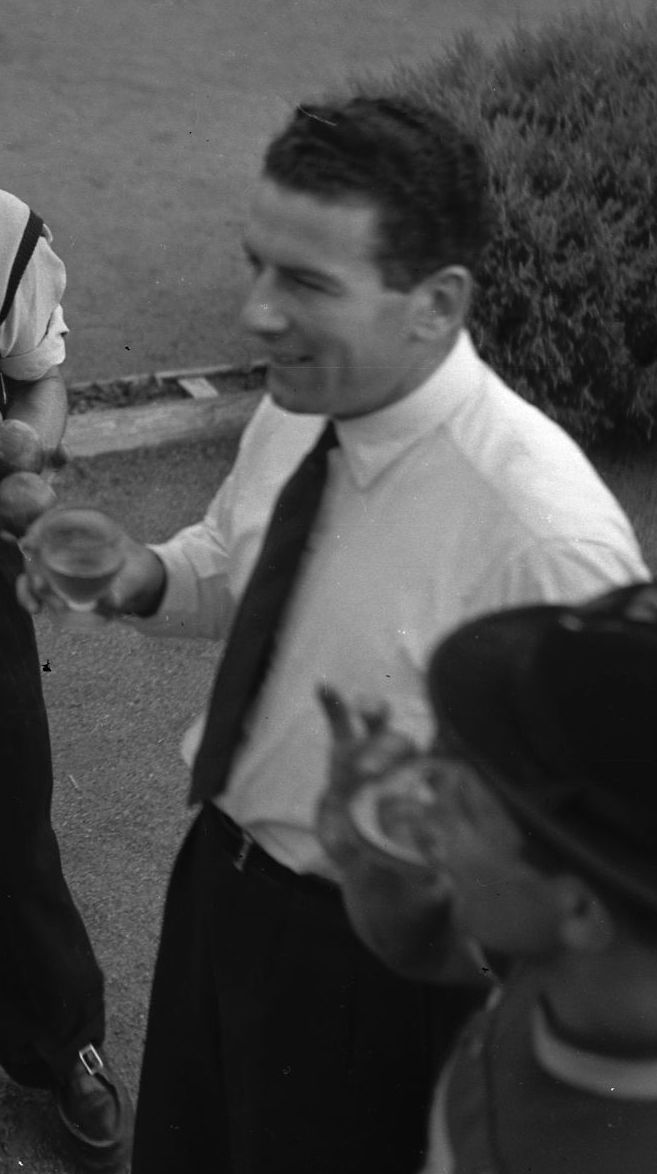

Personal information
- Full name: Lucien Teisseire
- Born: 11 December 1919 Saint-Laurent-du-Var, France
- Died: 22 December 2007 (aged 88)

Cycling career
- Sport: Cycling
- Discipline: Road
- Role: Rider

Major wins
- Critérium du Dauphiné Libéré (1953); 4 stages Tour de France
Medal record
Men's road bicycle racing
Representing France
World Championships
Bronze medal – third place	1948 Valkenburg	Elite Men's Road Race

Lucien Teisseire (11 December 1919 – 22 December 2007) was a French professional road bicycle racer. He was born in Saint-Laurent-du-Var, Alpes-Maritimes. He is most known for his bronze medal in the 1948 UCI Road World Championships. He finished second in the 1945 Paris–Roubaix.

== Major results ==
1942
Circuit des villes d'eaux d'Auvergne
1944
Paris–Tours
1947
GP de l'Echo d'Oran
Tour de France:

Winner stages 6 and 13

1948
GP du Pneumatique
Montluçon
Tour de France:

6th place overall classification

1949
Tour de France:

Winner stage 4

1951
GP de Cannes
1953
Mantes - La Baule
Critérium du Dauphiné Libéré
1954
Tour de France:

Winner stage 20

Sporting positions
Preceded by Gaby Gaudin	Winner of Paris–Tours; 1944	Succeeded by Paul Maye
Preceded by Jean Dotto	Winner of the Dauphiné Libéré; 1953	Succeeded by Nello Lauredi
