= Raoul Rémy =

French cyclist

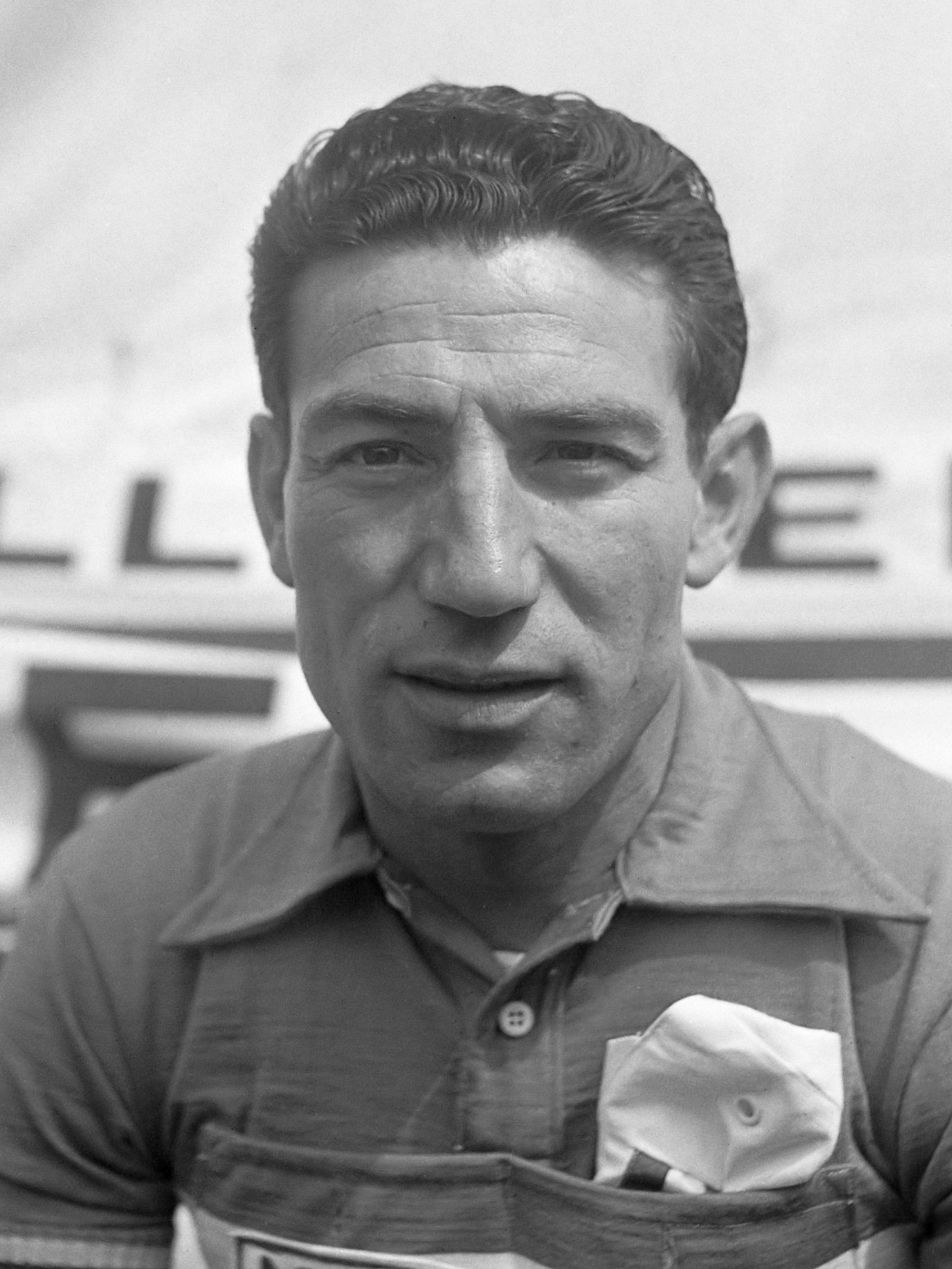
- Rémy in 1954

Personal information
- Full name: Raoul Rémy
- Born: 25 October 1919 Marseille, France
- Died: 26 June 2002 (aged 82) Marseille, France

Cycling career
- Sport: Cycling
- Discipline: Road
- Role: Rider

Major wins
- 2 stages Tour de France; Paris–Camembert (1948)

Raoul Rémy (25 October 1919, in Marseille – 26 June 2002, in Marseille) was a French professional road bicycle racer.

== Major results ==
1943
Charlieu
1946
Derby d'Auriolm
1947
Ajaccio
Circuit de l'Indre
La grande Combe
1948
La grande Combe
Paris–Camembert
Tour de France:

Winner stage 5

1949
GP Catox
GP de Guelma
1950
La ciotat
Manosque
Paris-Clermont-Ferrand
Rouen
1951
GP Nice
Nantua
Tour du Vaucluse
1952
Alger
GP de l'Echo d'Oran
Riez
Tour de France:

Winner stage 13

1953
Circuit de l'Haut Savoie
1954
GP de l'Echo d'Oran
1955
Ronde d'Aix-en-Provence
Sète
Montélimar
1957
Barsac
