= Édouard Fachleitner =

French cyclist (1921–2008)

Personal information
- Full name: Édouard Fachleitner
- Nickname: Le Berger de Manosque (The Shepherd of Manosque)
- Born: 24 February 1921 Sveta Nedelja, Italy
- Died: 18 July 2008 (aged 87) Manosque, France

Cycling career
- Sport: Cycling
- Discipline: Road
- Role: Rider

Major wins
- Grand Tours Tour de France 1 individual stage (1947) Stage races Critérium du Dauphiné Libéré (1948) One-day races and Classics Tour de Romandie (1950)

Édouard Fachleitner (24 February 1921 – 18 July 2008) was a French former professional road bicycle racer. He was an Italian citizen until 23 June 1939. He was a professional between 1943 and 1952. Fachleitner's best results were overall victories in the 1948 Critérium du Dauphiné Libéré and 1950 Tour de Romandie and second place overall in the 1947 Tour de France. He also won the one-day races GP d'Armagnac (1945), Ajaccio-Bastia (1946), Ronde d'Aix-en-Provence (1946) and GP de Cannes (1950).

== Major results ==
1945
1st, GP d'Armagnac

1946
1st, Ajaccio-Bastia
1st, Ronde d'Aix-en-Provence

1947
2nd, Overall, Tour de France

1st, Stage 11

1948
1st, Overall, Critérium du Dauphiné Libéré

2nd Stage 4a

1950
1st, GP de Cannes
1st, Overall, Tour de Romandie

3rd, Stage 1b
3rd, Stage 4
