= 1947 Tour de France =

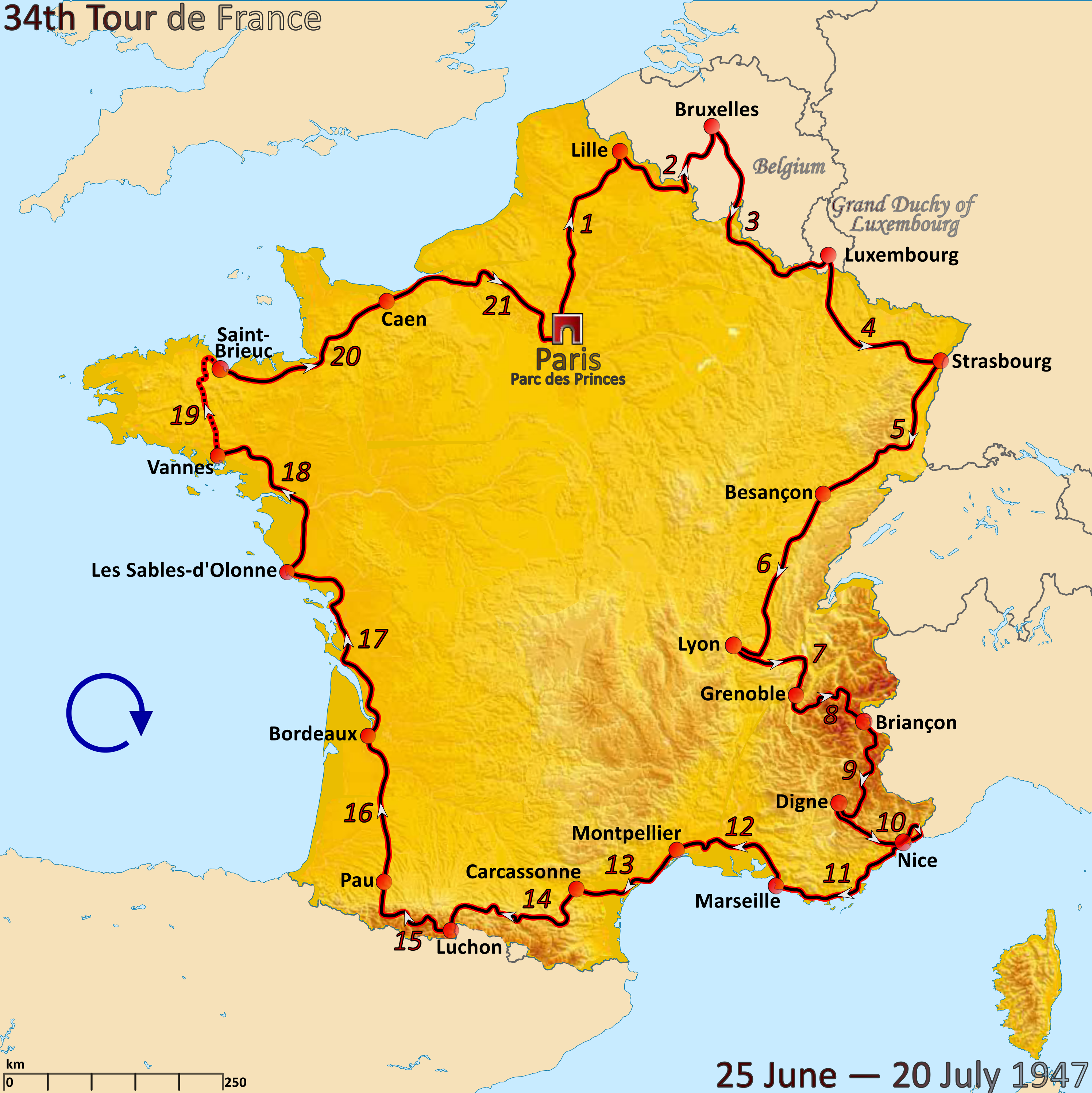
- Route of the 1947 Tour de France followed clockwise, starting and finishing in Paris

Race details
- Dates: 25 June – 20 July 1947
- Stages: 21
- Distance: 4,642 km (2,884 mi)
- Winning time: 148h 11' 25"

Results
Jersey awarded to the overall winner	Winner	Jean Robic (FRA)	(West)
	Second	Édouard Fachleitner (FRA)	(France)
	Third	Pierre Brambilla (ITA)	(Italy)
	Mountains	Pierre Brambilla (ITA)	(Italy)
	Team	Italy	

The 1947 Tour de France was the 34th edition of the Tour de France, taking place from 25 June to 20 July. The total race distance was 21 stages over 4,642 km (2,884 mi). It was the first Tour since 1939, having been cancelled during World War II, although some Tour de France-like races had been held during World War II.

Because the previous races had been canceled, there was no real favourite for the final victory. When René Vietto, the runner-up of 1939, captured the yellow jersey after his victory on the second stage, many thought he could remain first until the last day. Vietto, a climber, was less optimistic and lost his first place to Italian Pierre Brambilla after the time trial in stage 19. With only two stages to go, many now believed that Brambilla would win the race. On the last stage, there was an unexpected attack, and little-known French cyclist Jean Robic captured the lead. Robic had won the Tour de France without ever wearing the yellow jersey during the race, the first time that happened. (In 1953 Robic would lead the race for one more day).

== Background ==
After the 1939 Tour de France, the Second World War had made it impossible to organise a big cycling event in France, although some attempts had been taken. The rights on the Tour de France, previously owned by l'Auto, had been transferred to the French government. There were two newspapers interested in taking over these rights, so they both organised cycling events. The event organised by l'Équipe, "La Course du Tour de France", was more successful, and l'Équipe was given the right to organise the 1947 Tour de France.

== Teams ==
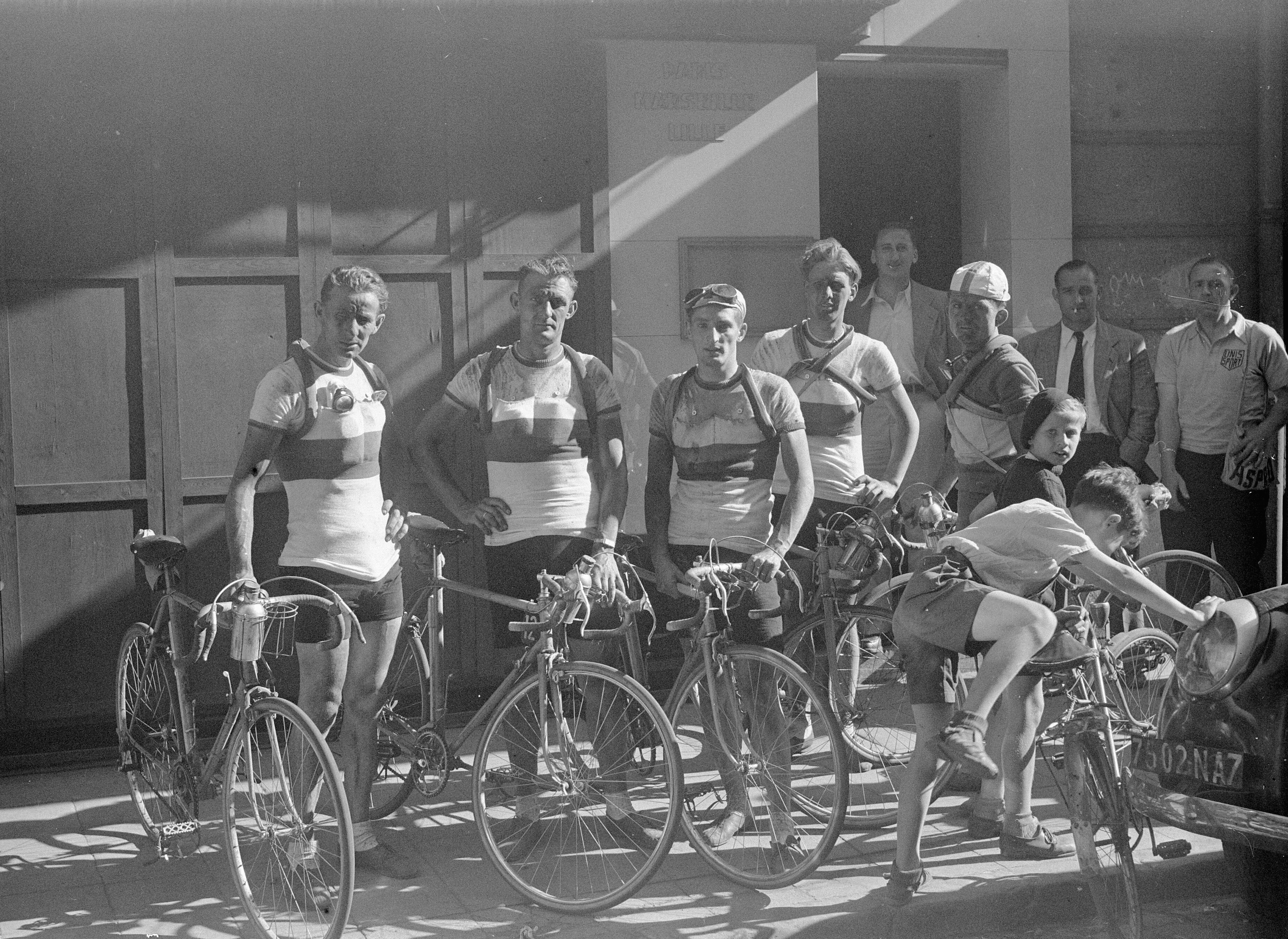
Dutch riders after stage one

The national teams format, which had been in use before the Second World War, was used again in 1947. The German team was not invited, and the Italian team was made up of Franco-Italians living in France, as the peace treaty between France and Italy was not yet official, so the countries were technically still at war.

The Tour organisers invited ten teams of ten cyclists each. Besides the Italian team, there was also a French team and a Belgian team, and a combined Swiss/Luxembourgian team. The plan was to have a joint Dutch-British team, but the Dutch cyclists protested because the British cyclists were too inexperienced, and the British cyclists were replaced by "French strangers". There were also five French regional teams: Île-de-France, West, North-East, Centre/South-West and South-East. Of the 100 cyclists, 53 finished the race.

The teams entering the race were:

- Belgium
- Netherlands/Strangers of France
- Italy
- Switzerland/Luxembourg
- France
- Île-de-France
- West
- North-East
- Centre/South-West
- South-East

== Route and stages ==
The 1947 Tour de France started on 25 June, and had five rest days, in Besançon, Briançon, Nice, Luchon and Vannes. The highest point of elevation in the race was 2,556 m (8,386 ft) at the summit tunnel of the Col du Galibier mountain pass on stage 8.

Stage characteristics and winners
Stage	Date	Course	Distance	Type	Winner
1	25 June	Paris to Lille	236 km (147 mi)	Plain stage	Ferdinand Kübler (SUI)
2	26 June	Lille to Brussels (Belgium)	182 km (113 mi)	Plain stage	René Vietto (FRA)
3	27 June	Brussels (Belgium) to Luxembourg City (Luxembourg)	314 km (195 mi)	Plain stage	Aldo Ronconi (ITA)
4	28 June	Luxembourg City (Luxembourg) to Strasbourg	223 km (139 mi)	Plain stage	Jean Robic (FRA)
5	29 June	Strasbourg to Besançon	248 km (154 mi)	Plain stage	Ferdinand Kübler (SUI)
	30 June	Besançon		Rest day	
6	1 July	Besançon to Lyon	249 km (155 mi)	Plain stage	Lucien Teisseire (FRA)
7	2 July	Lyon to Grenoble	172 km (107 mi)	Stage with mountain(s)	Jean Robic (FRA)
8	3 July	Grenoble to Briançon	185 km (115 mi)	Stage with mountain(s)	Fermo Camellini (ITA)
	4 July	Briançon		Rest day	
9	5 July	Briançon to Digne	217 km (135 mi)	Stage with mountain(s)	René Vietto (FRA)
10	6 July	Digne to Nice	255 km (158 mi)	Stage with mountain(s)	Fermo Camellini (ITA)
	7 July	Nice		Rest day	
11	8 July	Nice to Marseille	230 km (143 mi)	Plain stage	Édouard Fachleitner (FRA)
12	9 July	Marseille to Montpellier	165 km (103 mi)	Plain stage	Henri Massal (FRA)
13	10 July	Montpellier to Carcassonne	172 km (107 mi)	Plain stage	Lucien Teisseire (FRA)
14	11 July	Carcassonne to Luchon	253 km (157 mi)	Stage with mountain(s)	Albert Bourlon (FRA)
	12 July	Luchon		Rest day	
15	13 July	Luchon to Pau	195 km (121 mi)	Stage with mountain(s)	Jean Robic (FRA)
16	14 July	Pau to Bordeaux	195 km (121 mi)	Plain stage	Giuseppe Tacca (ITA)
17	15 July	Bordeaux to Les Sables-d'Olonne	272 km (169 mi)	Plain stage	Éloi Tassin (FRA)
18	16 July	Les Sables-d'Olonne to Vannes	236 km (147 mi)	Plain stage	Pietro Tarchini (SUI)
	17 July	Vannes		Rest day	
19	18 July	Vannes to Saint-Brieuc	139 km (86 mi)	Individual time trial	Raymond Impanis (BEL)
20	19 July	Saint-Brieuc to Caen	235 km (146 mi)	Plain stage	Maurice Diot (FRA)
21	20 July	Caen to Paris	257 km (160 mi)	Plain stage	Briek Schotte (BEL)
	Total		4,642 km (2,884 mi)		

== Race overview ==
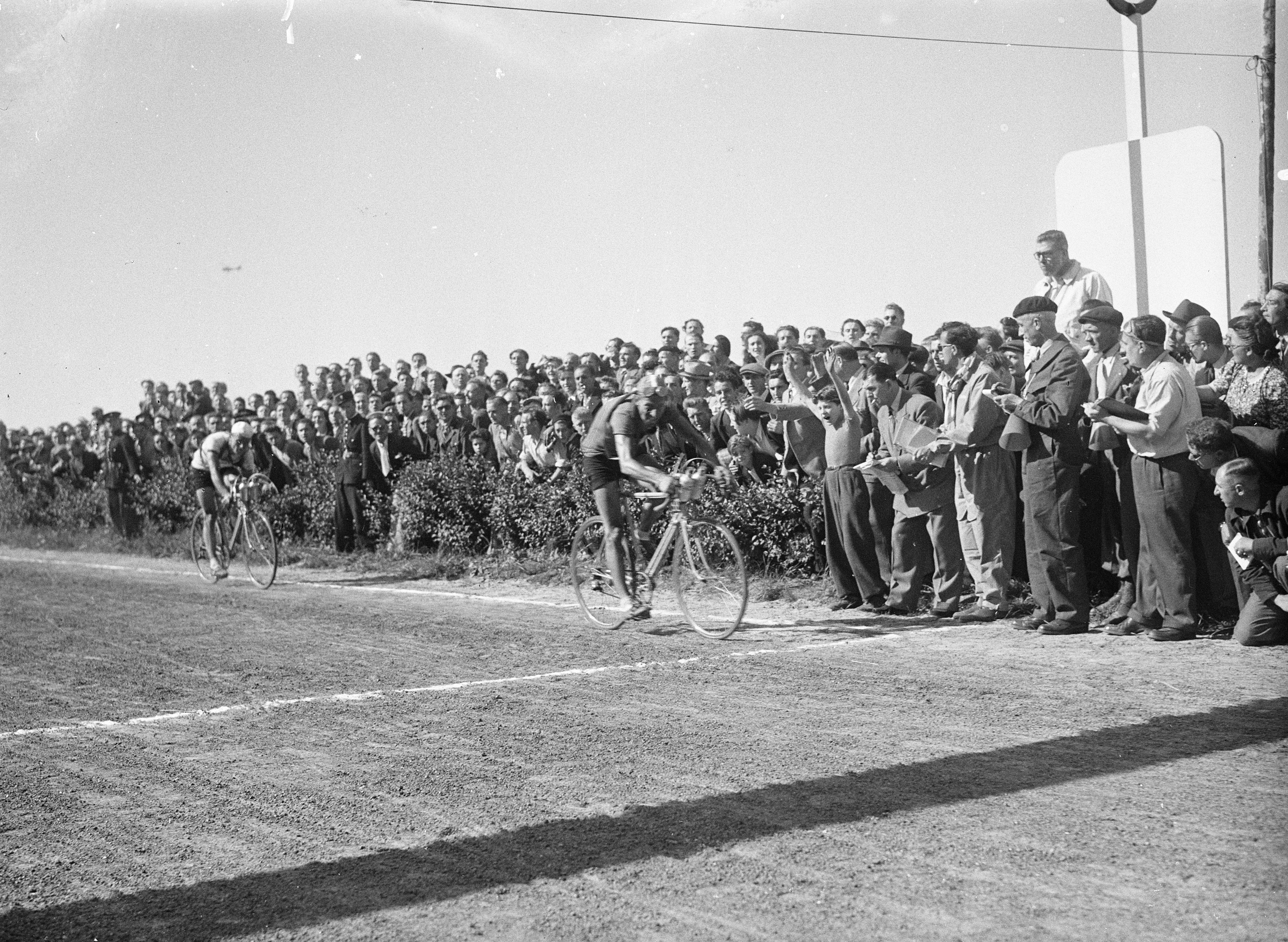
Ferdinand Kübler crossing the finish line in Lille ahead of André Mahé to win the opening stage

After Ferdinand Kübler had won the first stage, René Vietto took the lead by winning the second stage. After the third stage only Aldo Ronconi was within 90 seconds of Vietto, and the third man in the general classification was already more than eight minutes behind.

In the seventh stage, when the Alps mountains were climbed, Ronconi took over the lead, but two stages later Vietto took back the lead, helped by Apo Lazaridès.

Jean Robic had lost six minutes in that ninth stage, and lost more time in the tenth stage. He was already more than 25 minutes behind, and was no longer considered a favourite, but Robic was convinced that he would win the Tour.

In the fourteenth stage, Albert Bourlon escaped directly after the start. He stayed away until the end of the stage, 253 km (157 mi) later. This is the longest escape in the Tour de France after the second World War.

In the fifteenth stage, Robic escaped in the Pyrénees, and beat the other by more than ten minutes. Because of the time bonuses for reaching the mountain tops first, he even won back more than fifteen minutes. In the general classification, Robic rose to fifth place. With only three stages to go in the Tour, Vietto was still in the lead, 94 seconds ahead of Pierre Brambilla. The nineteenth stage was an individual time trial, the longest in Tour history. In that stage, Vietto lost considerable time, and Brambilla took over the lead in the general classification. Vietto performed worse than expected; there was speculation about why he performed so badly, and some said it was because of the motorcycle accident of a friend, while others said it was because he drank a bottle of cider during the time trial.

General classification before stage 21
Rank	Cyclist	Team	Time
1	Pierre Brambilla (ITA)	Italy	140h 44' 38"
2	Aldo Ronconi (ITA)	Italy	+ 53"
3	Jean Robic (FRA)	West	+ 2' 58"
4	René Vietto (FRA)	France	+ 5' 16"
5	Édouard Fachleitner (FRA)	France	+ 6' 56"

The last stage was flat, which makes it hard for escapers to win time. In that last stage, there was a hilltop prime, where money could be won by the first cyclist that passed. Although a group had already passed that hill, Robic was not aware of this, and sprinted for this prime. When he reached the top, Brambilla had been dropped. Robic and Fachleitner, fifth in the general classification, started to work together, and left Brambilla and Ronconi minutes behind. Around 140 km before the finish, they were three minutes ahead of Brambilla, which made Robic the virtual leader of the race. At that point Robic told Fachleitner: "You can not win the Tour, because I will not let you escape. If you ride with me, I will pay you 100.000 Francs."

When they reached Paris, they had won 13 minutes on them, enough to make Robic the winner of the Tour de France.

== Classification leadership and minor prizes ==
The cyclist to reach the finish in the least time was the winner of the stage. The time that each cyclist required to finish the stage was recorded. For the general classification, these times were added together. If a cyclist had received a time bonus, it was subtracted from this total; all time penalties were added to this total. The cyclist with the least accumulated time was the race leader, identified by the yellow jersey. With his victory, Robic won 500.000 francs. Additionally, future exhibitions and endorsements due to the Tour victory would give him another 3 to 4 million francs.

Additionally, there was the mountains classification, which did not have a jersey associated with it in 1947. Sixteen mountains were selected by the Tour organisation, divided in two classes. In the first-class mountains, the ten first cyclists received points, with 10 points for the first, 9 for the second, and so forth, to 1 point for the tenth. In the second-class mountains, only the first five cyclists received points, 5 for the first one to 1 for the fifth one. The mountains classification was won by Pierre Brambilla.

The team classification was calculated in 1947 by adding up the times of the best three cyclists of a team; the team with the least time was the winner.

The Souvenir Henri Desgrange was given in honour of Tour founder Henri Desgrange to the first rider to pass a point by his final residence, the "Villa Mia" in Beauvallon, Grimaud, on the French Riviera on stage 11. This prize was won by Raymond Impanis.

Classification leadership by stage
Stage	Winner	General classification	Mountains classification (Note: No jersey was awarded to the leader of the mountains classification until a white jersey with red polka dots was introduced in 1975.)	Team classification
1	Ferdinand Kübler	Ferdinand Kübler	no award	France-West
2	René Vietto	René Vietto	no award	Belgium
3	Aldo Ronconi	René Vietto	no award	Italy
4	Jean Robic	René Vietto	no award	Italy
5	Ferdinand Kübler	René Vietto	no award	Italy
6	Lucien Teisseire	René Vietto	no award	Italy
7	Jean Robic	Aldo Ronconi	Pierre Brambilla	Italy
8	Fermo Camellini	Aldo Ronconi	Pierre Brambilla	Italy
9	René Vietto	René Vietto	Pierre Brambilla	Italy
10	Fermo Camellini	René Vietto	Apo Lazaridès	Italy
11	Édouard Fachleitner	René Vietto	Apo Lazaridès	Italy
12	Henri Massal	René Vietto	Apo Lazaridès	Italy
13	Lucien Teisseire	René Vietto	Apo Lazaridès	Italy
14	Albert Bourlon	René Vietto	Apo Lazaridès	Italy
15	Jean Robic	René Vietto	Pierre Brambilla	Italy
16	Giuseppe Tacca	René Vietto	Pierre Brambilla	Italy
17	Éloi Tassin	René Vietto	Pierre Brambilla	Italy
18	Pietro Tarchini	René Vietto	Pierre Brambilla	Italy
19	Raymond Impanis	Pierre Brambilla	Pierre Brambilla	Italy
20	Maurice Diot	Pierre Brambilla	Pierre Brambilla	Italy
21	Briek Schotte	Jean Robic	Pierre Brambilla	Italy
Final		Jean Robic	Pierre Brambilla	Italy

== Final standings ==
=== General classification ===
Final general classification (1–10)
Rank	Rider	Team	Time
1	Jean Robic (FRA)	West	148h 11' 25"
2	Édouard Fachleitner (FRA)	France	+ 3' 58"
3	Pierre Brambilla (ITA)	Italy	+ 10' 07"
4	Aldo Ronconi (ITA)	Italy	+ 11' 00"
5	René Vietto (FRA)	France	+ 15' 23"
6	Raymond Impanis (BEL)	Belgium	+ 18' 14"
7	Fermo Camellini (ITA)	Netherlands/Strangers of France	+ 24' 08"
8	Giordano Cottur (ITA)	Italy	+ 1h 06' 03"
9	Jean-Marie Goasmat (FRA)	West	+ 1h 16' 03"
10	Apo Lazaridès (FRA)	South-East	+ 1h 18' 44"

Final general classification (11–53)
Rank	Rider	Team	Time
11	Lucien Teisseire (FRA)	France	+ 1h 32' 16"
12	Pierre Cogan (FRA)	West	+ 1h 44' 55"
13	Briek Schotte (BEL)	Belgium	+ 1h 56' 45"
14	Giuseppe Tacca (ITA)	Italy	+ 2h 06' 07"
15	Jean Diederich (LUX)	Switzerland/Luxembourg	+ 2h 10' 43"
16	Daniel Thuayre (FRA)	Île-de-France	+ 2h 13' 04"
17	Gottfried Weilenmann Jr. (SUI)	Switzerland/Luxembourg	+ 2h 18' 23"
18	Jean Kirchen (LUX)	Switzerland/Luxembourg	+ 2h 20' 26"
19	Paul Giguet (FRA)	South-East	+ 2h 26' 25"
20	Jean Goldschmidt (LUX)	Switzerland/Luxembourg	+ 2h 32' 24"
21	Albert Bourlon (FRA)	Centre/South-West	+ 2h 38' 18"
22	Bernard Gauthier (FRA)	South-East	+ 2h 52' 45"
23	Primo Volpi (ITA)	Italy	+ 3h 02' 48"
24	Roger Lévêque (FRA)	Centre/South-West	+ 3h 05' 04"
25	Kléber Piot (FRA)	France	+ 3h 10' 48"
26	Antoine Latorre (FRA)	Centre/South-West	+ 3h 14' 40"
27	Florent Mathieu (BEL)	Belgium	+ 3h 16' 28"
28	Raoul Rémy (FRA)	South-East	+ 3h 20' 31"
29	Marius Bonnet (FRA)	South-East	+ 3h 21' 20"
30	Henri Massal (FRA)	France	+ 3h 25' 49"
31	Egidio Feruglio (ITA)	Italy	+ 3h 43' 04"
32	Jefke Janssen (NED)	Netherlands/Strangers of France	+ 3h 57' 11"
33	Ange Le Strat (FRA)	West	+ 4h 06' 23"
34	Édouard Klabinski (POL)	Netherlands/Strangers of France	+ 4h 06' 36"
35	Louis Déprez (FRA)	North-East	+ 4h 09' 29"
36	Édouard Muller (FRA)	Île-de-France	+ 4h 17' 28"
37	Éloi Tassin (FRA)	West	+ 4h 23' 49"
38	René Oreel (BEL)	Belgium	+ 4h 29' 06"
39	Pascal Gnazzo (FRA)	South-East	+ 4h 34' 09"
40	Joseph Neri (FRA)	Centre/South-West	+ 4h 36' 27"
41	René Barret (FRA)	Île-de-France	+ 4h 38' 31"
42	Maurice Mollin (BEL)	Belgium	+ 4h 42' 27"
43	Roger Gyselinck (BEL)	Belgium	+ 4h 43' 47"
44	Raymond Lucas (FRA)	Île-de-France	+ 4h 45' 07"
45	Jean Breuer (BEL)	Belgium	+ 4h 45' 14"
46	Jean de Gribaldy (FRA)	North-East	+ 4h 51' 44"
47	Victor Joly (BEL)	Netherlands/Strangers of France	+ 4h 52' 18"
48	Alexandre Pawlisiak (FRA)	North-East	+ 5h 04' 06"
49	Maurice Diot (FRA)	Île-de-France	+ 5h 20' 43"
50	Gaston Rousseau (FRA)	East	+ 5h 34' 01"
51	Gaston Audier (FRA)	North-East	+ 5h 37' 55"
52	Leo Weilenmann (SUI)	Switzerland/Luxembourg	+ 6h 05' 34"
53	Pietro Tarchini (SUI)	Switzerland/Luxembourg	+ 7h 48' 18"

=== Mountains classification ===
Mountains in the mountains classification
Stage	Rider	Height	Mountain range	Class	Winner
7	l'Epine	987 metres (3,238 ft)	Alps	2	Apo Lazaridès
7	Granier	1,132 metres (3,714 ft)	Alps	1	Pierre Brambilla
8	Croix de Fer	2,066 metres (6,778 ft)	Alps	1	Fermo Camellini
8	Télégraphe	1,566 metres (5,138 ft)	Alps	1	Fermo Camellini
8	Galibier	2,556 metres (8,386 ft)	Alps	1	Fermo Camellini
9	Izoard	2,361 metres (7,746 ft)	Alps	1	Jean Robic
9	Vars	2,110 metres (6,920 ft)	Alps	1	Jean Robic
9	Allos	2,250 metres (7,380 ft)	Alps	1	René Vietto
10	Braus	1,002 metres (3,287 ft)	Alps-Maritimes	2	Apo Lazaridès
10	La Turbie	555 metres (1,821 ft)	Alps-Maritimes	2	Fermo Camellini
14	Port	1,250 metres (4,100 ft)	Pyrenees	2	Albert Bourlon
14	Portet d'Aspet	1,069 metres (3,507 ft)	Pyrenees	2	Albert Bourlon
15	Peyresourde	1,569 metres (5,148 ft)	Pyrenees	1	Jean Robic
15	Aspin	1,489 metres (4,885 ft)	Pyrenees	1	Jean Robic
15	Tourmalet	2,115 metres (6,939 ft)	Pyrenees	1	Jean Robic
15	Aubisque	1,709 metres (5,607 ft)	Pyrenees	1	Jean Robic

Final mountains classification (1–10)
Rank	Rider	Team	Points
1	Pierre Brambilla (ITA)	Italy	98
2	Apo Lazaridès (FRA)	South-East	89
3	Jean Robic (FRA)	West	70
4	Fermo Camellini (ITA)	Netherlands/Strangers of France	63
4	Aldo Ronconi (ITA)	Italy	63
6	René Vietto (FRA)	France	38
7	Édouard Fachleitner (FRA)	France	35
8	Jean-Marie Goasmat (FRA)	West	27
9	Giordano Cottur (ITA)	Italy	25
10	Lucien Teisseire (FRA)	France	19

=== Team classification ===
Final team classification (1–6)
Rank	Team	Time
1	Italy	446h 01' 25"
2	France	+ 23' 57"
3	West	+ 1h 33' 48"
4	Belgium	+ 4h 04' 17"
5	South-East	+ 5h 10' 44"
6	Switzerland/Luxembourg	+ 5h 22' 22"

== Aftermath ==
Robic never wore the yellow jersey as leader in the general classification in 1947, because he only became leader in the final stage. Only Jan Janssen has repeated that, in the 1968 Tour de France. Later in his career, Robic wore the yellow jersey for one day in the 1953 Tour de France.

== Bibliography ==
- Amels, Wim (1984). De geschiedenis van de Tour de France 1903–1984 (in Dutch). Valkenswaard, Netherlands: Sport-Express. ISBN 978-90-70763-05-3.
- Augendre, Jacques (2016). Guide historique [Historical guide] (PDF) (in French). Paris: Amaury Sport Organisation. Archived (PDF) from the original on 17 August 2016.
- Dauncey, Hugh; Hare, Geoffrey (2003). Tour de France 1903-2003 : a century of sporting structures, meanings and values. London: Frank Cass.
- Maso, Benjo (2003). Wij waren allemaal goden (in Dutch). Amsterdam: AmstelSport. ISBN 978-90-482-0003-0.
- McGann, Bill; McGann, Carol (2006). The Story of the Tour de France: 1903–1964. Vol. 1. Indianapolis: Dog Ear Publishing. ISBN 978-1-59858-180-5.
- Nauright, John; Parrish, Charles (2012). Sports Around the World: History, Culture, and Practice. Vol. 2. Santa Barbara, California: ABC-CLIO. ISBN 978-1-59884-300-2.
- Seray, Jacques [in French]; Lablaine, Jacques (2006). Henri Desgrange, l'homme qui créa le Tour de France [Henri Desgrange, the man who created the Tour de France] (in French). Saint-Malo, France: Editions Cristel. ISBN 978-2-84421-042-5.
