= List of teams and cyclists in the 1948 Tour de France =

As was the custom since 1930, the 1948 Tour de France was contested by national and regional teams. After there had not been an official Italian team allowed in the previous edition, the Italians were back. The Italian cyclists was divided between Gino Bartali and Fausto Coppi. Both argued in the preparation for the race about who would be the team leader. The Tour organisation wanted to have both cyclists in the race, so they allowed the Italians and Belgians to enter a second team. In the end, Coppi refused to participate, and Bartali became the team leader. The organisation still allowed the Italians and Belgians to enter a second team, but they were to be composed of young cyclists, and were named the Italian Cadets and the Belgian Aiglons.

The Tour organisation invited the Swiss to send a team, as they wanted Ferdinand Kübler, the winner of the 1948 Tour de Suisse, in the race. Kübler refused this because he could earn more money in other races. When the brothers Georges and Roger Aeschlimann announced that they wanted to join the race, they were quickly accepted, especially because they were from Lausanne, where the Tour would pass through. They were put in a team with eight non-French cyclists living in France, and were named the Internationals.

Twelve teams of ten cyclists entered the race: Belgium, Dutch/Luxembourg, Internationals, Italy, France, Belgian Aiglons, Italian Cadets, Centre–South-West, Ile de France–France-North-East, West-France, Paris and France-South-East. There were 60 French cyclists, 24 Italian, 22 Belgian, 6 Dutch, 4 Luxembourgian, 2 Swiss, 1 Polish and 1 Algerian cyclist.

== Start list ==
=== By team ===
Belgium
No.	Rider	Pos.
1	Norbert Callens (BEL)	DNF
2	André Declerck (BEL)	DNF
3	Raymond Impanis (BEL)	10
4	Florent Mathieu (BEL)	30
5	René Mertens (BEL)	DNF
6	Stan Ockers (BEL)	11
7	Albert Ramon (BEL)	DNF
8	Emile Rogiers (BEL)	DNF
9	Briek Schotte (BEL)	2
10	Edward Van Dijck (BEL)	14

Netherlands/Luxembourg
No.	Rider	Pos.
11	Cor Bakker (NED)	DNF
12	Henk de Hoog (NED)	DNF
13	Wim de Ruyter (NED)	42
14	Bernard Franken (NED)	DNF
15	Sjefke Janssen (NED)	36
16	Frans Pauwels (NED)	DNF
17	Henri Ackermann (LUX)	DNF
18	René Biver (LUX)	DNF
19	Willy Kemp (LUX)	DNF
20	Jeng Kirchen (LUX)	5

International
No.	Rider	Pos.
21	Georges Aeschlimann (SUI)	DNF
22	Roger Aeschlimann (SUI)	DNF
23	Pierre Brambilla (ITA)	DNF
24	Fermo Camellini (ITA)	8
25	Victor Joly (BEL)	DNF
26	Edward Klabiński (POL)	18
27	Roger Lambrecht (BEL)	7
28	Paul Néri (ITA)	37
29	Gino Sciardis (ITA)	DNF
30	Giuseppe Tacca (ITA)	DNF

Italy
No.	Rider	Pos.
31	Gino Bartali (ITA)	1
32	Antonio Bevilacqua (ITA)	33
33	Serafino Biagioni (ITA)	34
34	Giovanni Corrieri (ITA)	29
35	Giordano Cottur (ITA)	DNF
36	Guido De Santi (ITA)	DNF
37	Egidio Feruglio (ITA)	41
38	Bruno Pasquini (ITA)	19
39	Vincenzo Rossello (ITA)	DNF
40	Primo Volpi (ITA)	27

France
No.	Rider	Pos.
41	Louison Bobet (FRA)	4
42	Louis Caput (FRA)	DNF
43	Camille Danguillaume (FRA)	DNF
44	Édouard Fachleitner (FRA)	DNF
45	Émile Idée (FRA)	DNF
46	Apo Lazaridès (FRA)	21
47	Paul Giguet (FRA)	25
48	Jean Robic (FRA)	16
49	Lucien Teisseire (FRA)	6
50	René Vietto (FRA)	17

Belgium Aiglons
No.	Rider	Pos.
51	Marcel Dupont (BEL)	20
52	Jan Engels (BEL)	22
53	Léon Jomaux (BEL)	DNF
54	Lucien Mathys (BEL)	DNF
55	Maurice Meersman (BEL)	DNF
56	Maurice Mollin (BEL)	DNF
57	Rik Renders (BEL)	DNF
58	Florent Rondelé (BEL)	DNF
59	André Rosseel (BEL)	DNF
60	Adolph Verschueren (BEL)	DNF

Italy Cadets
No.	Rider	Pos.
61	Oreste Conte (ITA)	DNF
62	Enzo Coppini (ITA)	DNF
63	Umberto Drei (ITA)	DNF
64	Mario Fazio (ITA)	DNF
65	Attilio Lambertini (ITA)	31
66	Vittorio Magni (ITA)	38
67	Aldo Ronconi (ITA)	DNF
68	Virgilio Salimbeni (ITA)	DNF
69	Vittorio Seghezzi (ITA)	44
70	Nello Sforacchi (ITA)	DNF

France - Centre/South-West
No.	Rider	Pos.
71	Robert Desbats (FRA)	DNF
72	Raphaël Géminiani (FRA)	15
73	Guy Lapébie (FRA)	3
74	Roger Lévêque (FRA)	DNF
75	Alfred Macorig (FRA)	DNF
76	Henri Massal (FRA)	DNF
77	Paul Maye (FRA)	DNF
78	Daniel Orts (FRA)	DNF
79	Jacques Pras (FRA)	DNF
80	Georges Ramoulux (FRA)	26

France - Île de France/North-East
No.	Rider	Pos.
81	Pierre Baratin (FRA)	35
82	Urbain Caffi (FRA)	DNF
83	Jean de Gribaldy (FRA)	DNF
84	Maurice De Muer (FRA)	DNF
85	Louis Déprez (FRA)	DNF
86	Alphonse De Vreese (FRA)	32
87	François Hélary (FRA)	DNF
88	César Marcelak (FRA)	DNF
89	Édouard Muller (FRA)	DNF
90	Daniel Thuayre (FRA)	40

France - West
No.	Rider	Pos.
91	Robert Bonnaventure (FRA)	DNF
92	Maurice Carpentier (FRA)	DNF
93	Roger Chupin (FRA)	DNF
94	Pierre Cogan (FRA)	DNF
95	Jean-Marie Goasmat (FRA)	DNF
96	Raymond Guégan (FRA)	DNF
97	Yvan Marie (FRA)	DNF
98	François Person (FRA)	DNF
99	Roger Pontet (FRA)	DNF
100	Eloi Tassin (FRA)	DNF

France - Paris
No.	Rider	Pos.
101	André Brulé (FRA)	12
102	Robert Chapatte (FRA)	28
103	Maurice Diot (FRA)	DNF
104	Raymond Goussot (FRA)	DNF
105	Jean Lauk (FRA)	DNF
106	Lucien Lauk (FRA)	DNF
107	Jacques Marinelli (FRA)	DNF
108	Robert Mignat (FRA)	DNF
109	Kleber Piot (FRA)	13
110	Louis Thiétard (FRA)	9

France - South-East
No.	Rider	Pos.
111	Marius Bonnet (FRA)	DNF
112	Bernard Gauthier (FRA)	24
113	Georges Martin (FRA)	39
114	Maurice Lauze (FRA)	DNF
115	Pierre Molinéris (FRA)	DNF
116	Victor Pernac (FRA)	DNF
117	Raoul Rémy (FRA)	23
118	Jean Rey (FRA)	43
119	Amédée Rolland (FRA)	DNF
120	Abdel-Kader Zaaf (FRA)	DNF

=== By rider ===
Legend
No.	Starting number worn by the rider during the Tour
Pos.	Position in the general classification
DNF	Denotes a rider who did not finish

No.	Name	Nationality	Team	Pos.	Ref
1	Norbert Callens	Belgium	Belgium	DNF	
2	André Declerck	Belgium	Belgium	DNF	
3	Raymond Impanis	Belgium	Belgium	10	
4	Florent Mathieu	Belgium	Belgium	30	
5	René Mertens	Belgium	Belgium	DNF	
6	Stan Ockers	Belgium	Belgium	11	
7	Albert Ramon	Belgium	Belgium	DNF	
8	Emile Rogiers	Belgium	Belgium	DNF	
9	Briek Schotte	Belgium	Belgium	2	
10	Edward Van Dijck	Belgium	Belgium	14	
11	Cor Bakker	Netherlands	Netherlands/Luxembourg	DNF	
12	Henk de Hoog	Netherlands	Netherlands/Luxembourg	DNF	
13	Wim de Ruyter	Netherlands	Netherlands/Luxembourg	42	
14	Bernard Franken	Netherlands	Netherlands/Luxembourg	DNF	
15	Sjefke Janssen	Netherlands	Netherlands/Luxembourg	36	
16	Frans Pauwels	Netherlands	Netherlands/Luxembourg	DNF	
17	Henri Ackermann	Luxembourg	Netherlands/Luxembourg	DNF	
18	René Biver	Luxembourg	Netherlands/Luxembourg	DNF	
19	Willy Kemp	Luxembourg	Netherlands/Luxembourg	DNF	
20	Jeng Kirchen	Luxembourg	Netherlands/Luxembourg	5	
21	Georges Aeschlimann	Switzerland	International	DNF	
22	Roger Aeschlimann	Switzerland	International	DNF	
23	Pierre Brambilla	Italy	International	DNF	
24	Fermo Camellini	Italy	International	8	
25	Victor Joly	Belgium	International	DNF	
26	Edward Klabiński	Poland	International	18	
27	Roger Lambrecht	Belgium	International	7	
28	Paul Néri	Italy	International	37	
29	Gino Sciardis	Italy	International	DNF	
30	Giuseppe Tacca/Pierre Tacca	Italy/France	International	DNF	
31	Gino Bartali	Italy	Italy	1	
32	Antonio Bevilacqua	Italy	Italy	33	
33	Serafino Biagioni	Italy	Italy	34	
34	Giovanni Corrieri	Italy	Italy	29	
35	Giordano Cottur	Italy	Italy	DNF	
36	Guido De Santi	Italy	Italy	DNF	
37	Egidio Feruglio	Italy	Italy	41	
38	Bruno Pasquini	Italy	Italy	19	
39	Vincenzo Rossello	Italy	Italy	DNF	
40	Primo Volpi	Italy	Italy	27	
41	Louison Bobet	France	France	4	
42	Louis Caput	France	France	DNF	
43	Camille Danguillaume	France	France	DNF	
44	Édouard Fachleitner	France	France	DNF	
45	Émile Idée	France	France	DNF	
46	Apo Lazaridès	France	France	21	
47	Paul Giguet	France	France	25	
48	Jean Robic	France	France	16	
49	Lucien Teisseire	France	France	6	
50	René Vietto	France	France	17	
51	Marcel Dupont	Belgium	Belgium Aiglons	20	
52	Jan Engels	Belgium	Belgium Aiglons	22	
53	Léon Jomaux	Belgium	Belgium Aiglons	DNF	
54	Lucien Mathys	Belgium	Belgium Aiglons	DNF	
55	Maurice Meersman	Belgium	Belgium Aiglons	DNF	
56	Maurice Mollin	Belgium	Belgium Aiglons	DNF	
57	Rik Renders	Belgium	Belgium Aiglons	DNF	
58	Florent Rondelé	Belgium	Belgium Aiglons	DNF	
59	André Rosseel	Belgium	Belgium Aiglons	DNF	
60	Adolph Verschueren	Belgium	Belgium Aiglons	DNF	
61	Oreste Conte	Italy	Italy Cadets	DNF	
62	Enzo Coppini	Italy	Italy Cadets	DNF	
63	Umberto Drei	Italy	Italy Cadets	DNF	
64	Mario Fazio	Italy	Italy Cadets	DNF	
65	Attilio Lambertini	Italy	Italy Cadets	31	
66	Vittorio Magni	Italy	Italy Cadets	38	
67	Aldo Ronconi	Italy	Italy Cadets	DNF	
68	Virgilio Salimbeni	Italy	Italy Cadets	DNF	
69	Vittorio Seghezzi	Italy	Italy Cadets	44	
70	Nello Sforacchi	Italy	Italy Cadets	DNF	
71	Robert Desbats	France	France - Centre/South-West	DNF	
72	Raphaël Géminiani	France	France - Centre/South-West	15	
73	Guy Lapébie	France	France - Centre/South-West	3	
74	Roger Lévêque	France	France - Centre/South-West	DNF	
75	Alfred Macorig	France	France - Centre/South-West	DNF	
76	Henri Massal	France	France - Centre/South-West	DNF	
77	Paul Maye	France	France - Centre/South-West	DNF	
78	Daniel Orts	France	France - Centre/South-West	DNF	
79	Jacques Pras	France	France - Centre/South-West	DNF	
80	Georges Ramoulux	France	France - Centre/South-West	26	
81	Pierre Baratin	France	France - Île de France/North-East	35	
82	Urbain Caffi	France	France - Île de France/North-East	DNF	
83	Jean de Gribaldy	France	France - Île de France/North-East	DNF	
84	Maurice De Muer	France	France - Île de France/North-East	DNF	
85	Louis Déprez	France	France - Île de France/North-East	DNF	
86	Alphonse Devreese	France	France - Île de France/North-East	32	
87	François Hélary	France	France - Île de France/North-East	DNF	
88	César Marcelak	France	France - Île de France/North-East	DNF	
89	Édouard Muller	France	France - Île de France/North-East	DNF	
90	Daniel Thuayre	France	France - Île de France/North-East	40	
91	Robert Bonnaventure	France	France - West	DNF	
92	Maurice Carpentier	France	France - West	DNF	
93	Roger Chupin	France	France - West	DNF	
94	Pierre Cogan	France	France - West	DNF	
95	Jean-Marie Goasmat	France	France - West	DNF	
96	Raymond Guégan	France	France - West	DNF	
97	Yvan Marie	France	France - West	DNF	
98	François Person	France	France - West	DNF	
99	Roger Pontet	France	France - West	DNF	
100	Eloi Tassin	France	France - West	DNF	
101	André Brulé	France	France - Paris	12	
102	Robert Chapatte	France	France - Paris	28	
103	Maurice Diot	France	France - Paris	DNF	
104	Raymond Goussot	France	France - Paris	DNF	
105	Jean Lauk	France	France - Paris	DNF	
106	Lucien Lauk	France	France - Paris	DNF	
107	Jacques Marinelli	France	France - Paris	DNF	
108	Robert Mignat	France	France - Paris	DNF	
109	Kleber Piot	France	France - Paris	13	
110	Louis Thiétard	France	France - Paris	9	
111	Marius Bonnet	France	France - South-East	DNF	
112	Bernard Gauthier	France	France - South-East	24	
113	Georges Martin	France	France - South-East	39	
114	Maurice Lauze	France	France - South-East	DNF	
115	Pierre Molinéris	France	France - South-East	DNF	
116	Victor Pernac	France	France - South-East	DNF	
117	Raoul Rémy	France	France - South-East	23	
118	Jean Rey	France	France - South-East	43	
119	Amédée Rolland	France	France - South-East	DNF	
120	Abdel-Kader Zaaf	France	France - South-East	DNF	

=== Notes ===
1. The French naturalisation of Giuseppe Tacca, under the name of Pierre Tacca, became official during the Tour de France, on 2 July 1948.
