= Prix du Salon =

French cycling race

Race details
- Date: October
- Region: Paris, France
- Local name: Prix du Salon (in French)
- Discipline: Track
- Type: Madison

History
- First edition: 1928
- Editions: 24
- Final edition: 1958
- First winner: Alessandro Tonani (ITA), Onésime Boucheron (FRA)
- Most wins: Émile Carrara (FRA), Reginald Arnold (AUS), Ferdinando Terruzzi (ITA)
- Final winner: Reginald Arnold (AUS), Ferdinando Terruzzi (ITA)

The Prix du Salon was a French track cycling race in the madison discipline. It took place in the Vélodrome d'Hiver in Paris and was contested yearly in October.

The Prix du Salon was organized for the last time in 1958, after which the velodrome was demolished.

== Winners ==
Year	Winner	Second	Third
1928	(Italy) Alessandro Tonani (France) Onésime Boucheron	(Belgium) Alfred Hamerlinck (Belgium) Jules Van Hevel	(France) André Marcot (France) Georges Vandenhove
1929	(France) Lucien Louet (France) André Mouton	(France) Armand Blanchonnet (France) Paul Broccardo	(Belgium) Alexander Maes (Belgium) Louis Müller
1930	(Belgium) Adolphe Charlier (Belgium) Roger De Neef	(France) Armand Blanchonnet (France) Paul Broccardo	(Belgium) Alexander Maes (Belgium) Louis Müller
1931	(France) Michel Pecqueux (France) René Hournon	(Belgium) Adolphe Charlier (Belgium) Roger De Neef	(France) Octave Dayen (France) André Raynaud
1932	(Belgium) Georges Lemaire (Belgium) René Martin	(France) Roger Peix (France) Octave Dayen	(Belgium) Georges Ronsse (Belgium) Joseph Demuysere
1933	(Belgium) Albert Buysse (Belgium) Roger De Neef	(France) Charles Pélissier (France) André Leducq	(France) Onésime Boucheron (France) André Mouton
1934	(Netherlands) Frans Slaats (Netherlands) Janus Braspennincx	(France) Paul Broccardo (France) Marcel Guimbretière	(France) Antonin Magne (France) René Le Grevès
1935	(France) Charles Pélissier (France) Antonin Magne	(France) Roger Lapébie (France) André Raynaud	(France) Maurice Deschamps (Italy) Cesare Moretti
1936	(Belgium) Jean Aerts (Belgium) Gustave Danneels	(France) Octave Dayen (Denmark) Willy Hansen	(France) Charles Pélissier (France) Antonin Magne
1937	(Netherlands) Frans Slaats (Netherlands) Kees Pellenaars	(Belgium) Gustave Danneels (Belgium) Omer De Bruycker	(Italy) Jules Rossi (Italy) Cesare Moretti
1938	(Netherlands) Dirk Groenewegen (Netherlands) Gerrit Boeyen	(Belgium) Albert Buysse (France) Albert Billiet	(France) Fernand Wambst (France) Émile Diot
1939–1945	Not held		
1946	(France) Francis Grauss (France) Adolphe Prat	(France) Roger Godeau (France) Daniel Dousset	(France) Émile Carrara (France) Roger Prévotal
1947	(France) Arthur Sérès (France) Guy Lapébie	(France) Jacques Girard (France) Raymond Louviot	(France) André Pousse (France) Francis Grauss and (Australia) Alfred Strom (Australia) Reginald Arnold
1948	(France) Émile Carrara (France) Raymond Goussot	(Belgium) Marcel Kint (Belgium) Rik Van Steenbergen	(France) Arthur Sérès (France) Guy Lapébie
1949	(France) Jacques Girard (France) Roger Reynes	(France) Robert Mignat (France) Georges Guillier	(France) Émile Carrara (France) Raymond Goussot
1950	(Australia) Alfred Strom (Australia) Reginald Arnold	(France) Robert Mignat (France) Roger Queugnet	(France) Roger Godeau (France) Bernard Bouvard
1951	(France) Émile Carrara (France) Guy Lapébie	(France) André Darrigade (France) Dominique Forlini	(France) Roger Godeau (France) Raymond Goussot
1952	(France) Émile Carrara (France) Dominique Forlini	(France) Roger Piel (France) Marcel Logerot	(France) Roger Reynes (France) Jean Le Nizerhy
1953	(Belgium) Stan Ockers (Belgium) Rik Van Steenbergen	(France) Jean Gueguen (France) Attilio Redolfi	(France) Pierre Iacoponelli (France) Claude Brugerolles
1954	(France) Dominique Forlini (Italy) Ferdinando Terruzzi	(France) Marcel Bareth (France) Jean Le Nizerhy	(France) Jacques Bellenger (France) Paul Matteoli
1955	(Denmark) Kay Werner Nielsen (Denmark) Evan Klamer	(Luxembourg) Lucien Gillen (Italy) Ferdinando Terruzzi	(Spain) Miguel Poblet (Spain) Guillermo Timoner
1956	(Belgium) Arsène Rijckaert (Belgium) Willy Lauwers	(France) Henri Andrieux (France) Serge Blusson	(France) André Lemoine (France) Joseph Groussard
1957	(Australia) Reginald Arnold (Italy) Ferdinando Terruzzi	(France) Dominique Forlini (France) Georges Senfftleben	(Belgium) Willy Lauwers (Belgium) Willy Vannitsen
1958	(Australia) Reginald Arnold (Italy) Ferdinando Terruzzi	(Belgium) Rik Van Steenbergen (Belgium) Emile Severeyns	(Netherlands) Peter Post (Luxembourg) Lucien Gillen
