= Six Days of Saint-Étienne =

Race details
- Date: March, April, September, October
- Region: Saint-Étienne, France
- Local name(s): Six Jours de Saint-Étienne (in French)
- Discipline: Track
- Type: Six-day racing

History
- First edition: 1928
- Editions: 12
- Final edition: 1953
- First winner: Lucien Choury (FRA); Louis Fabre (FRA)
- Most wins: Piet van Kempen (NED)
- Final winner: Ferdinando Terruzzi (ITA); Lucien Gillen (LUX)

The Six Days of Saint-Étienne was a six-day track cycling race held annually in the Vélodrome de Saint-Étienne, France.

Piet van Kempen won in three of the twelve editions.

== Winners ==
| Year | Winner | Second | Third |
|---|---|---|---|
| 1928 | (France) Lucien Choury (France) Louis Fabre | (Belgium) Oscar Daemers (Belgium) Kamiel De Clercq | (France) Alfred Beyl (France) Jean Cugnot |
| 1929 | (France) Georges Peyrode (France) André Mouton | (France) Lucien Choury (France) Louis Fabre | (France) Onésime Boucheron (France) Raymond Hournon |
| 1930 | (Netherlands) Piet van Kempen (France) Francis Fauré | (France) André Mouton (Germany) Jean Schorn | (France) Paul Wuyard (France) Roger Peix |
| 1931 | (Belgium) Omer De Bruycker (Belgium) Albert Billiet | (Belgium) Henri Aerts (Belgium) Louis Muller | (Belgium) Armand Haesendonck (Belgium) August Mortelmans |
| 1932–1935 | Not held | | |
| 1936 | (Netherlands) Piet van Kempen (Belgium) Jean van Buggenhout | (France) Onésime Boucheron (France) André Mouton | (France) Octave Dayen (France) Georges Wambst |
| 1937 | (Netherlands) Piet van Kempen (Belgium) Jean van Buggenhout | (United States) Alfred Crossley (United States) Jimmy Walthour | (France) Onésime Boucheron (France) André Mouton |
| 1938 | (Netherlands) Cor Wals (France) Marcel Guimbretière | (France) André Mouton (Netherlands) Jan Pijnenburg | (France) Octave Dayen (France) Michel Pecqueux |
| 1939–1948 | Not held | | |
| 1949 | (France) Émile Carrara (France) Raymond Goussot | (France) Bernard Bouvard (France) Roger Godeau | (France) Raymond Louviot (France) Victor Pernac |
| 1950 | (France) Guy Lapébie (Belgium) Achiel Bruneel | (Belgium) Ernest Thyssen (Belgium) Maurice Depauw | (France) Arthur Sérès (France) Roger-Jean Le Nizerhy |
| 1951 | (Belgium) Robert Naeye (Belgium) Ernest Thyssen | (France) Émile Carrara (France) Guy Lapébie | (Switzerland) Armin von Büren (Switzerland) Walter Bücher |
| 1952 | (France) Émile Carrara (France) Georges Senfftleben | (France) Bernard Bouvard (France) Roger Godeau | (France) Marcel Logerot (France) Roger Piel |
| 1953 | (Italy) Ferdinando Terruzzi (Luxembourg) Lucien Gillen | (Germany) Otto Ziege (Germany) Théo Intra | (France) Robert Chapatte (France) Henri Surbatis |
