= 1948 Paris–Tours =

Race details
- Dates: 25 April 1948
- Stages: 1
- Distance: 251 km (156.0 mi)
- Winning time: 5h 49' 47"

Results
	Winner	Louis Caput (FRA)
	Second	Robert Mignat (FRA)
	Third	Émile Idée (FRA)

The 1948 Paris–Tours was the 42nd edition of the Paris–Tours cycle race and was held on 25 April 1948. The race started in Paris and finished in Tours. The race was won by Louis Caput.

== General classification ==
Final general classification

Rank	Rider	Time
1	Louis Caput (FRA)	5h 49' 47"
2	Robert Mignat (FRA)	+ 0"
3	Émile Idée (FRA)	+ 0"
4	Jean Lauk (FRA)	+ 0"
5	Fermo Camellini (ITA)	+ 0"
6	André Mahé (FRA)	+ 0"
7	Briek Schotte (BEL)	+ 2' 25"
8	Adolfo Leoni (ITA)	+ 2' 25"
9	Albert Ramon (BEL)	+ 2' 25"
10	Lucien Lauk (FRA)	+ 2' 25"
