= 1948 Tour of Flanders =

32nd Tour of Flanders
Race details
- Dates: 18 April 1948
- Stages: 1
- Distance: 257 km (159.7 mi)
- Winning time: 6h 53' 00"

Results
	Winner	Briek Schotte (BEL)	(Alcyon–Dunlop)
	Second	Albert Ramon (BEL)	(Arliguie–Hutchinson)
	Third	Marcel Rijckaert (BEL)	(Mercier–Hutchinson)

The 32nd running of the Tour of Flanders cycling classic was held on Sunday, 18 April 1948. Belgian Briek Schotte won the race in a four-man sprint. It was Schotte's second win in the Tour of Flanders, after 1942. 265 riders, of which 50 non-Belgians, started the race, an all-time record. 85 of them finished.

== Route ==
The race started in Ghent and finished in Wetteren – totaling 257 km. The course featured three categorized climbs:

- Kwaremont
- Kruisberg
- Edelareberg

== Results ==
Result
Rank	Rider	Team	Time
1	Briek Schotte (BEL)	Alcyon–Dunlop	6h 53' 00"
2	Albert Ramon (BEL)	Arliguie–Hutchinson	s.t.
3	Marcel Rijckaert (BEL)	Mercier–Hutchinson	s.t.
4	Raymond Impanis (BEL)	Alcyon–Dunlop	s.t.
5	Gerard Buyl (BEL)	Carrara–Dunlop	+ 15"
6	Cor Bakker (NED)	Vege	s.t.
7	Maurice Dewannemaecker (BEL)	Rochet–Dunlop	s.t.
8	Camille Beeckman (BEL)	Rochet–Dunlop	+ 30"
9	Arie Vooren (NED)	Vege	s.t.
10	Rik Renders (BEL)	Garin–Wolber	s.t.
