= 1946 Paris–Tours =

Race details
- Dates: 12 May 1946
- Stages: 1
- Distance: 251 km (156.0 mi)
- Winning time: 6h 39' 19"

Results
	Winner	Briek Schotte (BEL)
	Second	Roger Prevotal (FRA)
	Third	Maurice De Muer (FRA)

The 1946 Paris–Tours was the 40th edition of the Paris–Tours cycle race and was held on 12 May 1946. The race started in Paris and finished in Tours. The race was won by Briek Schotte.

== General classification ==
Final general classification

Rank	Rider	Time
1	Briek Schotte (BEL)	6h 39' 19"
2	Roger Prevotal (FRA)	+ 1' 14"
3	Maurice De Muer (FRA)	+ 1' 16"
4	Frans Bonduel (BEL)	+ 4' 20"
5	Jacques Geus (BEL)	+ 4' 20"
6	Marcel Tiger (FRA)	+ 4' 20"
7	Maurice Desimpelaere (BEL)	+ 4' 20"
8	André Denhez (FRA)	+ 4' 20"
9	Lucien Le Guevel (FRA)	+ 4' 20"
10	Robert Van Eenaeme (BEL)	+ 4' 20"
