= 1952 Paris–Tours =

Race details
- Dates: 5 October 1952
- Stages: 1
- Distance: 253 km (157.2 mi)
- Winning time: 6h 11' 30"

Results
	Winner	Raymond Guégan (FRA)
	Second	Briek Schotte (BEL)
	Third	Louis Caput (FRA)

The 1952 Paris–Tours was the 46th edition of the Paris–Tours cycle race and was held on 5 October 1952. The race started in Paris and finished in Tours. The race was won by Raymond Guegan.

== General classification ==
Final general classification

Rank	Rider	Time
1	Raymond Guégan (FRA)	6h 11' 30"
2	Briek Schotte (BEL)	+ 0"
3	Louis Caput (FRA)	+ 0"
4	Jan de Valck (BEL)	+ 0"
5	Louison Bobet (FRA)	+ 0"
6	André Darrigade (FRA)	+ 0"
6	Karel Debaere (BEL)	+ 0"
6	Albert Dolhats (FRA)	+ 0"
9	Émile Baffert (FRA)	+ 0"
9	Attilio Redolfi (FRA)	+ 0"
