= 1944 Paris–Roubaix =

Cycling race

Race details
- Dates: 9 April 1944
- Stages: 1
- Distance: 246 km (153 mi)
- Winning time: 6h 09' 57"

Results
	Winner	Maurice Desimpelaere (BEL)
	Second	Jules Rossi (ITA)
	Third	Louis Thiétard (FRA)

The 1944 Paris–Roubaix was the 42nd edition of the Paris–Roubaix, a classic one-day cycle race in France. The single day event was held on 9 April 1944 and stretched 246 km (153 mi) from Paris to the finish at Roubaix Velodrome. The winner was Maurice Desimpelaere from Belgium.

== Results ==
Final results (1–10)
Rank	Cyclist	Time
1	Maurice Desimpelaere (BEL)	6h 09' 57″
2	Jules Rossi (ITA)	+0' 00″
3	Louis Thiétard (FRA)	+0' 00″
4	Raymond Goussot (FRA)	+0' 00″
5	Georges Claes (BEL)	+0' 00″
6	Emiel Faignaert (BEL)	+0' 00″
7	Alvaro Giorgetti (ITA)	+0' 00″
8	Amédée Rolland (FRA)	+0' 00″
9	Manuel Huguet (FRA)	+0' 00″
10	Lucien Vlaemynck (FRA)	+0' 00″
