= 1947 Paris–Tours =

Race details
- Dates: 4 May 1947
- Stages: 1
- Distance: 251 km (156.0 mi)
- Winning time: 6h 39' 19"

Results
	Winner	Briek Schotte (BEL)
	Second	Émile Idée (FRA)
	Third	Albert Sercu (BEL)

The 1947 Paris–Tours was the 41st edition of the Paris–Tours cycle race and was held on 4 May 1947. The race started in Paris and finished in Tours. The race was won by Briek Schotte.

== General classification ==
Final general classification

Rank	Rider	Time
1	Briek Schotte (BEL)	6h 39' 19"
2	Émile Idée (FRA)	+ 0"
3	Albert Sercu (BEL)	+ 0"
4	Henri Massal (FRA)	+ 0"
5	Antonin Rolland (FRA)	+ 0"
6	Roger de Corte (BEL)	+ 0"
6	Maurice De Muer (FRA)	+ 0"
6	Maurice Desimpelaere (BEL)	+ 0"
6	Robert Dorgebray (FRA)	+ 0"
6	Albert Dubuisson (BEL)	+ 0"
