= 1947 Paris–Roubaix =

Cycling race

Race details
- Dates: 6 April 1947
- Stages: 1
- Distance: 246 km (153 mi)
- Winning time: 6h 10' 34"

Results
	Winner	Georges Claes (BEL)
	Second	Adolf Verschueren (BEL)
	Third	Louis Thiétard (FRA)

The 1947 Paris–Roubaix was the 45th edition of the Paris–Roubaix, a classic one-day cycle race in France. The single day event was held on 6 April 1947 and stretched 246 km (153 mi) from Paris to the finish at Roubaix Velodrome. The winner was Georges Claes from Belgium.

== Results ==
Final results (1–10)
Rank	Cyclist	Time
1	Georges Claes (BEL)	6h 10' 34″
2	Adolf Verschueren (BEL)	+0' 00″
3	Louis Thiétard (FRA)	+0' 00″
4	Raymond Impanis (BEL)	+0' 16″
5	Albéric Schotte (BEL)	+0' 51″
6	Olimpio Bizzi (ITA)	+0' 56″
7	Édouard Fachleitner (FRA)	+0' 56″
8	Maurice De Muer (FRA)	+0' 56″
9	Lucien Teisseire (FRA)	+2' 42″
10	Lucien Vlaemynck (BEL)	+3' 43″
