= 1946 Paris–Roubaix =

Cycling race

Race details
- Dates: 21 April 1946
- Stages: 1
- Distance: 246 km (152.9 mi)
- Winning time: 7h 13' 25"

Results
	Winner	Georges Claes (BEL)
	Second	Louis Gauthier (FRA)
	Third	Lucien Vlaemynck (BEL)

The 1946 Paris–Roubaix was the 44th edition of the Paris–Roubaix, a classic one-day cycle race in France. The single day event was held on 21 April 1946 and stretched 246 km (153 mi) from Paris to the finish at Roubaix Velodrome. The winner was Georges Claes from Belgium.

== Results ==
Final results (1–10)
Rank	Cyclist	Time
1	Georges Claes (BEL)	7h 13' 25″
2	Louis Gauthier (FRA)	+0' 00″
3	Lucien Vlaemynck (BEL)	+0' 00″
4	Frans Bonduel (BEL)	+0' 19″
5	Camille Danguillaume (FRA)	+0' 29″
6	Georges Blum (FRA)	+0' 29″
7	Maurice Desimpelaere (BEL)	+0' 29″
8	Victor Pernac (FRA)	+0' 29″
9	Joseph Soffietti (FRA)	+0' 29″
10	Marcel Kint (BEL)	+0' 29″
