= 1950 Tour of Flanders =

34th Tour of Flanders
Race details
- Dates: 2 April 1950
- Stages: 1
- Distance: 275 km (170.9 mi)
- Winning time: 8h 15'

Results
	Winner	Fiorenzo Magni (ITA)	(Ganna)
	Second	Briek Schotte (BEL)	(Alcyon–Dunlop)
	Third	Louis Caput (FRA)	(Olympia–Dunlop)

The 34th running of the Tour of Flanders cycling classic was held on Sunday, 2 April 1950. Italian Fiorenzo Magni won the race with a two-minute lead over Briek Schotte. Frenchman Louis Caput was third at more than nine minutes. It was Magni's second consecutive victory in the Tour of Flanders. 21 of 220 riders finished.

== Route ==
The race started in Ghent and finished in Wetteren – totaling 275 km. The course featured five categorized climbs:

- Tiegemberg
- Kwaremont
- Kruisberg
- Edelareberg
- Muur van Geraardsbergen

== Results ==
Result
Rank	Rider	Team	Time
1	Fiorenzo Magni (ITA)	Ganna	8h 15' 00"
2	Briek Schotte (BEL)	Alcyon–Dunlop	+ 2' 10"
3	Louis Caput (FRA)	Olympia–Dunlop	+ 9' 20"
4	Maurice Diot (FRA)	Mercier–Hutchinson	s.t.
5	André Maelbrancke (BEL)	Star Nord	s.t.
6	Eugène van Roosbroeck (BEL)	Alcyon–Dunlop	s.t.
7	Valère Ollivier (BEL)	Bertin–Wolber	+ 12' 15"
8	Roger Gyselinck (BEL)	Groene Leeuw	s.t.
9	Basiel Wambeke (BEL)	Condor	+ 13' 15"
10	César Marcelak (FRA)	Mercier–Hutchinson	+ 15' 10"
