= Lapébie =

Lapébie is a surname. Notable people with the surname include:

- Guy Lapébie (1916–2010), French cyclist
- Roger Lapébie (1911–1996), French cyclist
