= 1948 Paris–Roubaix =

Cycling race

Race details
- Dates: 4 April 1948
- Stages: 1
- Distance: 246 km (152.9 mi)
- Winning time: 5h 35' 31"

Results
	Winner	Rik Van Steenbergen (BEL)
	Second	Émile Idée (FRA)
	Third	Georges Claes (BEL)

The 1948 Paris–Roubaix was the 46th edition of the Paris–Roubaix, a classic one-day cycle race in France. The single day event was held on 4 April 1948 and stretched 246 km (153 mi) from Paris to the finish at Roubaix Velodrome. The winner was Rik Van Steenbergen from Belgium.

== Results ==
Final results (1–10)
Rank	Cyclist	Time
1	Rik Van Steenbergen (BEL)	5h 35' 31″
2	Émile Idée (FRA)	+0' 00″
3	Georges Claes (BEL)	+0' 16″
4	Adolf Verschueren (BEL)	+0' 16″
5	Fiorenzo Magni (ITA)	+0' 16″
6	Gildo Monari (ITA)	+0' 16″
7	Marcel Rijckaert (BEL)	+0' 37″
8	Adolfo Leoni (ITA)	+0' 43″
9	André Mahé (FRA)	+0' 43″
10	Roger Gyselinck (BEL)	+0' 43″
