= 1952 UCI Track Cycling World Championships =

- Venue: Paris, France
- Date: 26–31 August 1952
- Velodrome: Parc des Princes
- Events: 5

The 1952 UCI Track Cycling World Championships were the World Championship for track cycling. They took place in Paris, France from 26 to 31 August 1952. Five events for men were contested, 3 for professionals and 2 for amateurs.

== Medal summary ==
Event	Gold	Silver	Bronze
Men's Professional Events
Men's sprint	Oscar Plattner; Switzerland	Georges Senfftleben; France	Jan Derksen; Netherlands
Men's individual pursuit	Sid Patterson; Australia	Antonio Bevilacqua; Italy	Lucien Gillen; Luxembourg
Men's motor-paced	Adolph Verschueren; Belgium	Walter Lohmann; West Germany	Henri Lemoine; France
Men's Amateur Events
Men's sprint	Enzo Sacchi; Italy	Marino Morettini; Italy	Cyril Peacock; Great Britain
Men's individual pursuit	Piet van Heusden; Netherlands	Mino De Rossi; Italy	Loris Campana; Italy

== Medal table ==
Rank	Nation	Gold	Silver	Bronze	Total
1	Italy (ITA)	1	3	1	5
2	Netherlands (NED)	1	0	1	2
3	Australia (AUS)	1	0	0	1
3	Belgium (BEL)	1	0	0	1
3	Switzerland (SUI)	1	0	0	1
6	France (FRA)	0	1	1	2
7	West Germany (FRG)	0	1	0	1
8	Great Britain (GBR)	0	0	1	1
8	Luxembourg (LUX)	0	0	1	1
Totals (9 entries)		5	5	5	15

== See also ==
- 1952 UCI Road World Championships
