= Onésime Boucheron =

French bicycle racer (1904–1996)

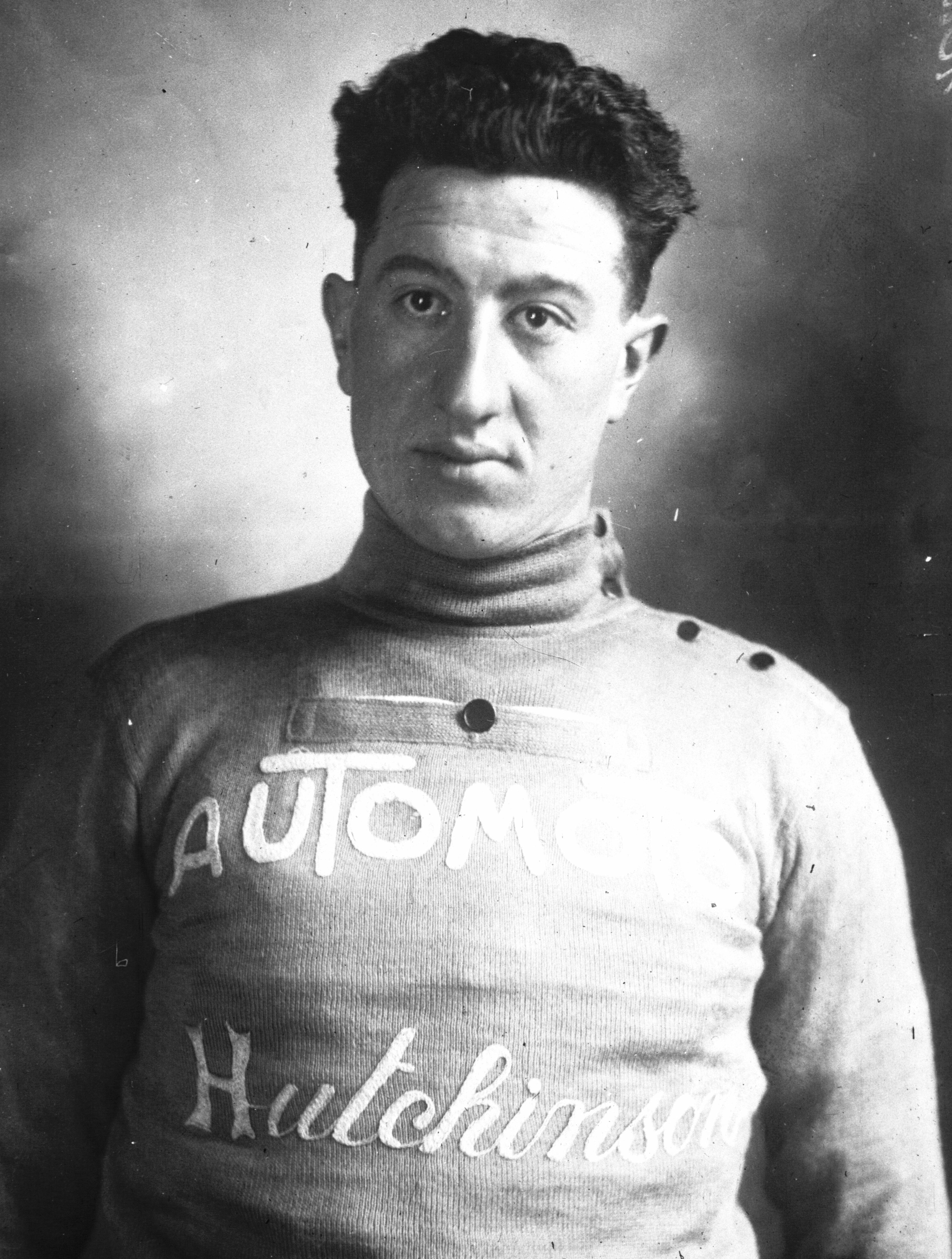
- Boucheron in 1927

Personal information
- Full name: Édouard Eugène Onésime Boucheron
- Born: 10 February 1904; Meung-sur-Loire, Loiret, France
- Died: 2 June 1996 (aged 92); Blois, France
- Years active: 1926—1937

Édouard Eugène Onésime Boucheron (10 February 1904 — 2 June 1996) was a French racing cyclist. A professional from 1926 to 1937, he participated in six-day racing.

== Road cycling record ==
- 1926
  - Champion de France des aspirants
  - Limoges-Saint-Léonard-Limoges
  - 3rd place in the Tour de Corrèze
- 1927
  - 1st place in the Circuit boussaquin
  - 2nd place in the Paris-Épernay race

== Track cycling record ==
- 1928
  - Six Days of Paris (with Alessandro Tonani)
  - Prix du Salon (with Alessandro Tonani)
  - 2nd place in the Six Days of Milan
- 1929
  - 3rd place in the Six Days of Saint-Étienne
  - 3rd place in the Prix Hourlier-Comès
- 1930
  - Prix Dupré-Lapize (with Armand Blanchonnet)
- 1931
  - 3rd place in the Six Days of Paris
- 1932
  - 3rd place in the Prix du Salon
- 1934
  - 3rd place in the Prix Hourlier-Comès
- 1936
  - 2nd place in the Six Days of Saint-Étienne
- 1937
  - 3rd place in the Six Days of Saint-Étienne
