= Age of Aquarius =

Astrology term

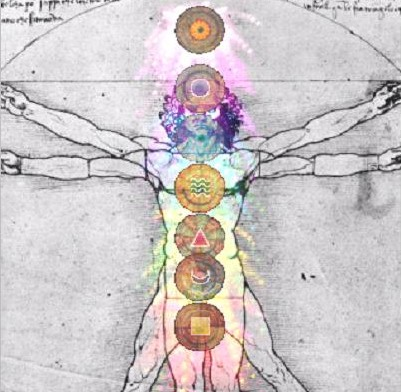
An Age of Aquarius symbol: Leonardo da Vinci's Vitruvian Man. Da Vinci drew the original of this figure c. 1487. Chakras, or energy centers, have been superimposed digitally.

In astrology, the Age of Aquarius is either the current or forthcoming astrological age, depending on the method of calculation. Astrologers maintain that an astrological age is a product of the Earth's slow precessional rotation and lasts for 2,160 years, on average (one 25,920 year period of precession, or great year, divided by 12 zodiac signs equals a 2,160‑year astrological age).

There are various methods of calculating the boundaries of an astrological age. In Sun-sign astrology, the first sign is Aries, followed by Taurus, Gemini, Cancer, Leo, Virgo, Libra, Scorpio, Sagittarius, Capricorn, Aquarius, and Pisces, whereupon the cycle returns to Aries and through the zodiacal signs again. Astrological ages proceed in the opposite direction. Therefore, the Age of Aquarius follows the Age of Pisces. (Note: Spencer (2000), pp. 115–127 chapter 7, "Love shall steer the stars – the long dawning of the age of Aquarius.)

== Overview ==
The approximate 2,160 years for each age corresponds to the average time it takes for the vernal equinox to move from one constellation of the zodiac into the next. This average can be computed by dividing the Earth's 25,800-year gyroscopic precession period by 12, the number of zodiacal signs. This is only a rough calculation, as the length of time it takes for a complete precession is currently decreasing (because the rate of precession per year, an inverse relationship to the period, is increasing). A more accurate set of figures is 25,772 years for a complete cycle and 2,147.5 years per astrological age, assuming a constant precession rate. According to various astrologers' calculations, approximate dates for entering the age of Aquarius range from 1447 AD (Terry MacKinnell) to 3597 AD (John Addey).

Astrologers do not agree on when the Aquarian age will start or even if it has already started. Campion (1999) lists various references from mainly astrological sources for the start of the Age of Aquarius. Based on Campion's summary, most published materials on the subject state that the Age of Aquarius arrived in the 20th century (29 claims), with the 24th century in second place with 12 claimants. (Note: Eight researchers claim the Aquarian age will arrive in the 25th century while the 21st, 26th, and 27th centuries have seven supporters each. Other centuries that have a number of supporters for the beginning of the Aquarian age include: 22nd and 23rd centuries (6 each); 19th century (5); and the 18th century (4).)

Astrological ages are taken to be associated with the precession of the equinoxes. The slow wobble of the Earth's rotation axis on the celestial sphere is independent of the diurnal rotation of the Earth on its own axis and the annual revolution of the Earth around the Sun. Traditionally this 25,800-year-long cycle is calibrated, for the purposes of determining astrological ages, by the perceived location of the Sun in one of the 12 zodiac constellations at the vernal (Spring) equinox, which corresponds to the moment the Sun is perceived as crossing the celestial equator, each year marking the start of spring in the Northern Hemisphere, and the start of autumn in the Southern Hemisphere. Roughly every 2,150 years the Sun's position at the time of the vernal equinox will have moved into a new zodiacal constellation.

In 1929 the International Astronomical Union defined the edges of the 88 official constellations. The edge established between Pisces and Aquarius officially locates the beginning of the Aquarian Age in 2595 AD Many astrologers dispute this approach because of the varying sizes and overlap between the zodiacal constellations. They prefer the long-established convention of equally-sized signs, spaced every 30 degrees along the ecliptic, which are named after what were the 12 background zodiacal constellations when tropical astrology was codified circa 100 AD.

== Astrological meaning ==
Astrologers believe that an astrological age affects humanity, possibly by influencing the rise and fall of civilizations or cultural tendencies.

Traditionally, Aquarius is associated with

- electricity
- computers
- flight
- democracy
- freedom
- humanitarianism
- idealism
- modernization
- nervous disorders
- rebellion
- nonconformity
- philanthropy
- veracity
- perseverance
- humanity
- irresolution

Among other dates, one view is that the age of Aquarius arrived around 1844, with the harbinger of Siyyid ʿAlí Muḥammad (1819–1850), who founded Bábism.

Moore & Douglas (1971) promoted the view that, although no one knows when the Aquarian age begins, the American Revolution, the Industrial Revolution, and the discovery of electricity are all magically attributable to Aquarian influence. They make a number of predictions about the trends that they believe will develop in the Aquarian age.

Proponents of medieval astrology suggest that the Pisces world where religion is the opiate of the masses will be replaced in the Aquarian age by a world ruled by secretive, power-hungry elites seeking absolute power over others; that knowledge in the Aquarian age will only be valued for its ability to win wars; that knowledge and science will be abused, not industry and trade; and that the Aquarian age will be another dark age in which religion is considered offensive.

Another view suggests that the rise of scientific rationalism, combined with the fall of religious influence, the increasing focus on human rights since the 1780s, the exponential growth of technology, plus the advent of flight and space travel, are evidence of the dawning of the age of Aquarius.

A "wave" theory of the shifting great ages suggests that the age of Aquarius will not arrive on a given date, but is instead emerging in influence over many years, similar to how the tide rises gradually, by small increments, rather than surging forward all at once.

Rudolf Steiner believed that the age of Aquarius will arrive in 3573 CE. In Steiner's approach, each age is exactly 2,160 years. Based on this structure, the world has been in the age of Pisces since 1413. Rudolf Steiner had spoken about two great spiritual events: The return of Christ in the ethereal world (and not in a physical body), because people must develop their faculties until they can reach the ethereal world; and the incarnation of Ahriman, Zoroaster's "destructive spirit" that will try to block the development of humanity.

In a 1890 article about feminism in the French newspaper La Fronde on 26 February 1890, August Vandekerkhove stated: "About March, 21st this year the cycle of Aquarius will start. Aquarius is the house of the woman". He adds that is in this age the woman will be "equal" to the man.

Gnostic philosopher Samael Aun Weor declared 4 February 1962 to be the beginning of the "age of Aquarius", heralded by the alignment of the first six planets, the Sun, the Moon and the constellation Aquarius.

Analytical psychologist Carl Jung mentions the "age of Aquarius" in his book Aion, believing that the "age of Aquarius" will "constellate the problem of the union of the opposites". In accordance with prominent astrologers, Jung believed the "age of Aquarius" will be a dark and spiritually deficient time for humanity, writing that

"it will no longer be possible to write off evil as the mere privation of good; its real existence will have to be recognized in the age of Aquarius".

According to Jung's interpretation of astrology, the "age of Pisces" began with the birth and death of Christ, associating the ichthys (colloquially known as the "Jesus fish") with the symbol of Pisces; following the "age of Pisces" would be the "age of Aquarius", the spiritually deficient age before the arrival of the Antichrist.

== In pop culture ==
The expression "age of Aquarius" in popular culture usually refers to the heyday of the hippie and New Age movements in the 1960s and 1970s.

The 1967 musical Hair, with its opening song "Aquarius" which features the line "This is the dawning of the Age of Aquarius" in the chorus, brought the Aquarian age concept to the attention of audiences worldwide. The song further defines this "dawning of the age" within the first lines:

"When the moon is in the Seventh House
And Jupiter aligns with Mars
Then peace will guide the planets
And love will steer the stars".

The 1969 cover version by American R&B group The 5th Dimension (a medley that also incorporates part of the song "Let the Sunshine In"), became a radio hit, remaining at number one on the US Billboard Hot 100 pop singles chart for several weeks.

Astrologer Neil Spencer denounced the lyrics as "astrological gibberish", noting that Jupiter aligns with Mars several times a year and the Moon is in the 7th house for two hours every day.

The Woodstock music festival was billed as "an Aquarian exposition".

== See also ==
- Aeon of Horus – Era of time in the religion of Thelema
- Astrological age
- Axial precession – Change of rotational axis in an astronomical body
- Tetramorph – Symbolic arrangement of four differing elements
