= Parsac =

- Commune
- Location of Parsac
- Location within France Location within Nouvelle-Aquitaine
- Coordinates: 46°12′11″N 2°09′11″E
- Country: France
- Region: Nouvelle-Aquitaine
- Department: Creuse
- Arrondissement: Guéret
- Canton: Gouzon
- Intercommunality: CC Creuse Confluence

Government
  - Mayor (2025–2026): François Riva
- Area^{1}: 53.92 km^{2} (20.82 sq mi)
- Highest elevation: 503 m (1,650 ft)
- Lowest elevation: 353 m (1,158 ft)
- Population (2023): 825
  - Density: 15.3/km^{2} (39.6/sq mi)
- Time zone: UTC+01:00 (CET)
  - Summer (DST): UTC+02:00 (CEST)
- INSEE/Postal code: 23149 /23140
- ^{1} French Land Register data, which excludes lakes, ponds, glaciers > 1 km^{2} (0.386 sq mi or 247 acres) and river estuaries.

Parsac (French pronunciation: [paʁsak]; Auvergnat: Parçac) is a commune in the Creuse department (Nouvelle-Aquitaine region) in central France. It was formed on 1 January 2025, with the merger of Parsac-Rimondeix and Blaudeix. Parsac-Rimondeix was the result of the merger, on 1 January 2016, of the former communes Parsac and Rimondeix. Parsac is situated on the banks of the river Verraux, some 23 km (14 mi) east of Guéret.

== Population ==
Population data refer to the commune in its geography as of January 2025.

Historical population
Year	Pop.	±% p.a.
1968	1,031	—
1975	890	−2.08%
1982	820	−1.16%
1990	801	−0.29%
1999	762	−0.55%
2007	794	+0.52%
2012	791	−0.08%
2017	800	+0.23%
2023	825	+0.51%
Source: INSEE

== Sights ==
- The twelfth-century church.
- The remains of two feudal castles.
- An old stone bridge.
- The fifteenth-century tower.
- A twelfth-century chapel at La Madeleine

== See also ==
- Communes of the Creuse department
