= Émile Idée =

French cyclist (1920–2024)

Emile Idée
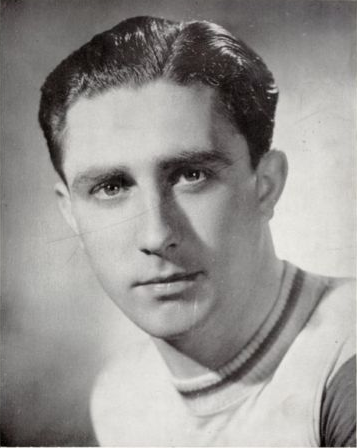

Personal information
- Full name: Emile Idée
- Nickname: Le Roi de Chevreuse
- Born: 19 July 1920 Nouvion-le-Comte, France
- Died: 30 December 2024 (aged 104) Marolles-en-Brie, France

Cycling career
- Sport: Cycling
- Discipline: Road
- Role: Rider

Professional teams
- 1941–1946: Alcyon–Dunlop
- 1946–1947: La Perle–Hutchinson
- 1947: Olmo–Fulgor
- 1948–1952: Peugeot–Dunlop

Major wins
- Grand Tours Tour de France 1 individual stage (1949) Stage races Critérium International (1940, 1942–43, 1947, 1949) One-day races and Classics National Road Race Championships (1942, 1947) Grand Prix des Nations (1942)

Émile Idée (19 July 1920 – 30 December 2024) was a French professional road bicycle racer. Idée was a five-time winner of the Critérium National (a race that saw its name changed to Critérium International in 1979), a record he shares with Raymond Poulidor and Jens Voigt. He finished in second place in the 1948 Paris–Roubaix.

Idée turned 100 on 19 July 2020 and died on 30 December 2024, at the age of 104. At the time of his death he was said to have been the oldest Tour de France stage winner.

== Major results ==
1940
1st Critérium National de la Route
1942
1st Road race, National Road Championships
1st Critérium National de la Route
1st Paris-Reims
1st Grand Prix des Nations (occupied zone)
1st GP de Provence
1943
1st Critérium National de la Route
5th Grand Prix des Nations
1944
1st Circuit de Paris
3rd Road race, National Road Championships
3rd Grand Prix des Nations
1945
3rd Paris–Tours
3rd Critérium National de la Route
1946
2nd Grand Prix des Nations
1947
1st Road race, National Road Championships
1st Critérium National de la Route
1st Ronde d'Aix-en-Provence
2nd Paris–Tours
2nd Critérium des As
2nd Grand Prix des Nations
1948
1st Trophée du Journal d'Alger
2nd Paris–Roubaix
2nd Critérium National de la Route
3rd Paris–Tours
1949
1st Critérium National de la Route
1st Stage 13 Tour de France
8th GP de Suisse
1950
1st Cote de Gourdon
3rd Road race, National Road Championships
4th Grand Prix des Nations
5th Paris–Tours
6th GP Lugano
8th Road race, UCI Road World Championships
9th Paris–Brussels
1951
1st Stage 4a Paris–Nice
