= 1958 Harelbeke–Antwerp–Harelbeke =

Race details
- Dates: 3 May 1958
- Stages: 1
- Distance: 210 km (130 mi)
- Winning time: 5h 42' 00"

Results
	Winner	Armand Desmet (BEL)
	Second	Lucien Demunster (BEL)
	Third	Briek Schotte (BEL)

The 1958 Harelbeke–Antwerp–Harelbeke (Note: The race was known as Harelbeke–Antwerp–Harelbeke (French: Harelbeke–Anvers–Harelbeke) for the first twelve editions. In 1970, the race became known as the E3, after the Belgian road which is now known as the E17.) was the inaugural edition of the E3 Harelbeke cycle race and was held on 3 May 1958. The race started and finished in Harelbeke. The race was won by Armand Desmet.

== General classification ==
Final general classification

Rank	Rider	Time
1	Armand Desmet (BEL)	5h 42' 00"
2	Lucien Demunster (BEL)	+ 0"
3	Briek Schotte (BEL)	+ 0"
4	André Noyelle (BEL)	+ 0"
5	Jos Theuns (BEL)	+ 0"
6	Leopold Rosseel (BEL)	+ 0"
7	René Van Meenen (BEL)	+ 0"
8	Noël Foré (BEL)	+ 0"
9	Victor Wartel (BEL)	+ 0"
10	Julien Pascal (BEL)	+ 0"
