= August Vandekerkhove =

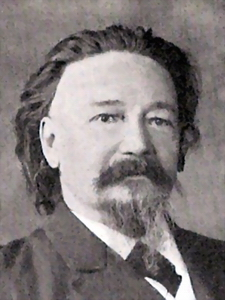
August Vandekerkhove

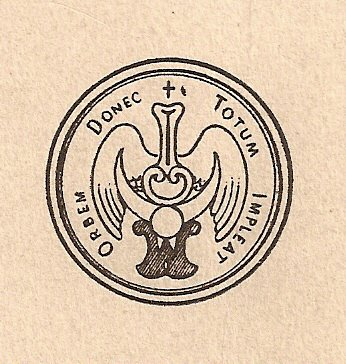
Seal of the Cosmosophic Movement

August Vandekerkhove (Kanegem, 15 October 1838 – Mâcon, 24 March 1923) was a Belgian writer, art painter and inventor. He wrote under the pseudonym S.U.Zanne. He started a movement he called Cosmosofie (Cosmosophy), which he claimed it to be the anti-thesis of Theosophy.

He wrote in magazines such as La Fronde, La Lumière, Borderland, L'Initiation, La Solidarité Mondiale, La Haute Science, Annales Initiatiques, Petit Journal, 1889, and L'Action Féministe.

August Vandekerkhove was one of the first persons to coin the term, "the Age of Aquarius", in a French magazine, "La Fronde" in late February 1899. This is likely one of the first mentions of the "age of Aquarius", which is said to begin when the March equinox point moves out of the constellation Pisces and into the constellation Aquarius.

Each year, on the afternoon of Palm Sunday, at 5 PM, people gather around his grave at the cemetery of Flacé, rue Ambroise Paré, in Mâcon in France to remember him.
