= Piet van Heusden =

Dutch cyclist (1929–2023)

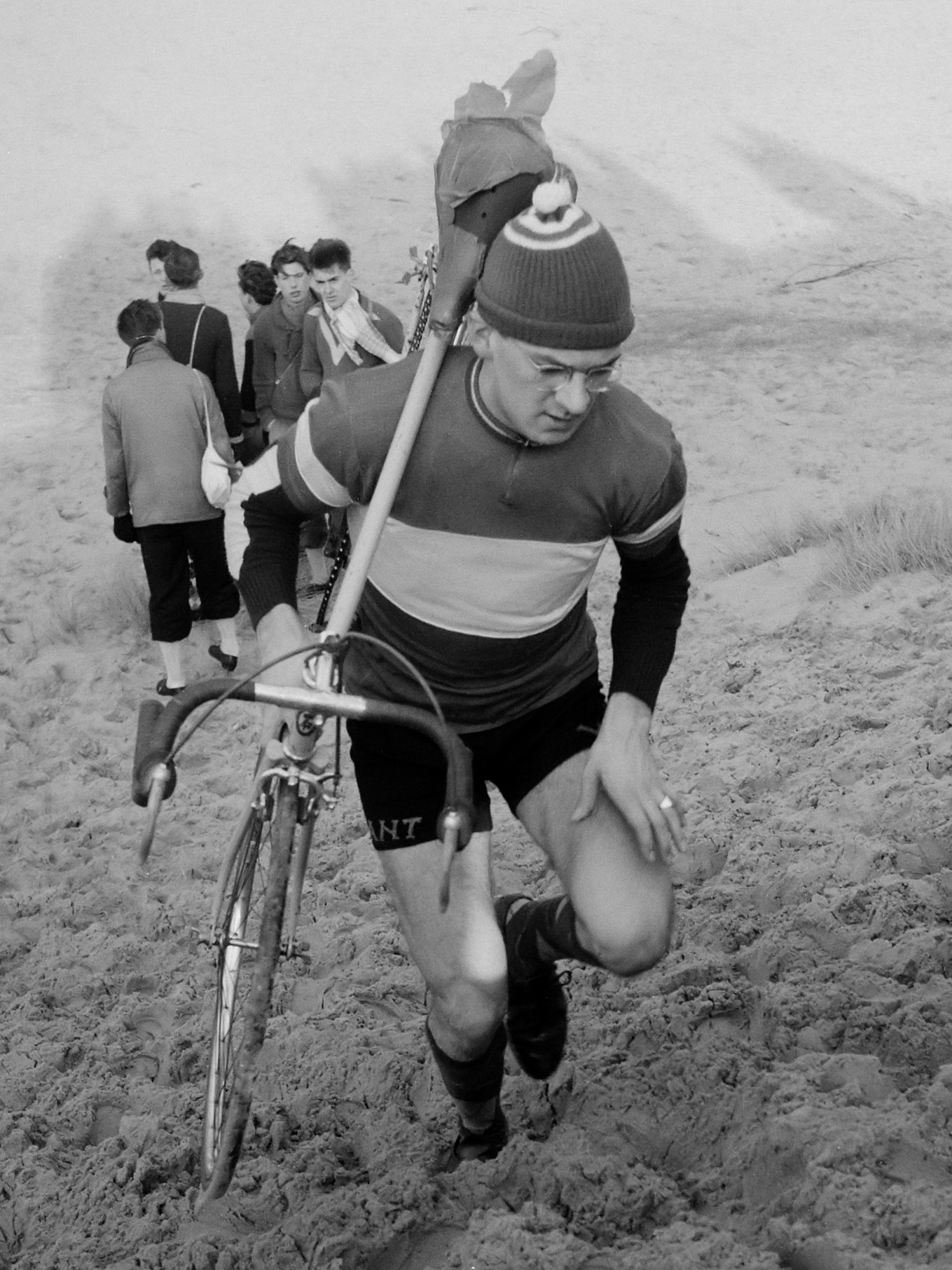
- Van Heusden in 1954

Personal information
- Born: 11 July 1929 Amsterdam, Netherlands
- Died: 15 January 2023 (aged 93)

Cycling career
- Sport: Cycling
- Discipline: Track
- Role: Rider
- Rider type: Pursuitist

Piet van Heusden (11 July 1929 – 15 January 2023) was a Dutch cyclist. He competed in'the individual pursuit and was the amateur world champion in 1952.

== Awards ==
1952
1st Individual pursuit, UCI Amateur Track World Championships
