= Kanegem =

Coordinates: 51°01′N 3°24′E

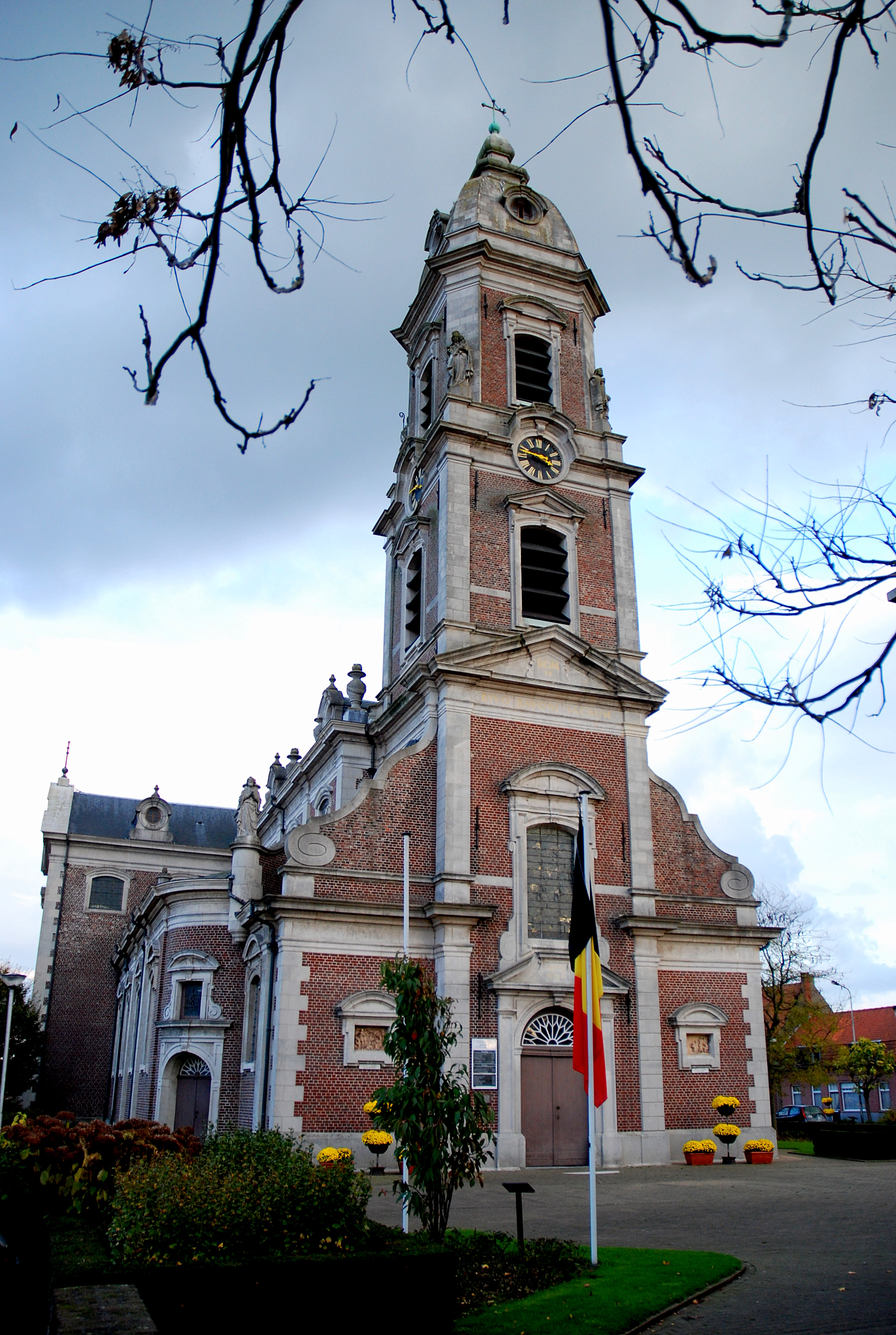
St. Bavo's Church

Kanegem is a Belgian locality, part of the municipality of Tielt, in the eastern part of the province of West Flanders. This rural locality is known as the "Green Village".

== Sightseeing ==
- St. Bavo's Church, a Baroque church, well known locally as De kathedraal van te lande ("the country cathedral")
- Mevrouw Windmill

== Famous personalities ==
- Godfried Danneels, Belgian cardinal and former archbishop of Mechelen
- August Vandekerkhove, inventor and author
- Briek Schotte, racing cyclist.
