= Émile Carrara =

French bicycle racer and track cyclist (1925–1992) (1925–1992)

Personal information
- Born: 11 January 1925 Argenteuil, France
- Died: 28 April 1992 (aged 67) Copenhagen, Denmark

Cycling career
- Sport: Cycling
- Disciplines: Road; Track
- Role: Rider

Amateur team
- 1943–1945: VC Levallois

Professional teams
- 1946: Alcyon–Dunlop
- 1947: La Perle–Hutchinson
- 1948–1953: Carrara–Dunlop
- 1954: Ideor
- 1955: Saint-Raphaël–R. Geminiani–Dunlop
- 1957: Essor
- 1958–1959: Saint-Raphaël–R. Geminiani–Dunlop

Émile Carrara (11 January 1925 – 28 April 1992) was a French professional road and track cyclist. On the track, he notably won a total of nine six-day races as well as the national pursuit championships in 1947. On the road, his biggest victory was the 1944 Grand Prix des Nations.

== Major results ==
=== Road ===
1944
1st Grand Prix des Nations
1945
1st Paris-Évreux
1st Paris–Mantes
2nd Grand Prix des Nations
1946
5th Liège–Bastogne–Liège
1947
1st Critérium des As
2nd Critérium National de la Route

=== Track ===
1947
1st Individual pursuit, National Track Championships
1949
1st Six Days of Saint-Étienne (with Raymond Goussot)
1st Prix Dupré-Lapize (with Raymond Goussot)
1951
1st Six Days of Berlin 1 (with Guy Lapébie)
1st Six Days of Berlin 2 (with Heinz Zoll)
1st Six Days of Hanover (with Guy Lapébie)
1st Six Days of Munich (with Guy Lapébie)
1952
1st Six Days of Hanover (with Georges Senfftleben)
1st Six Days of Dortmund (with Guy Lapébie)
1st Six Days of Saint-Étienne (with Georges Senfftleben)
1st Six Days of Berlin (with Guy Lapébie)
1st Prix Dupré-Lapize (with Georges Senfftleben)
1953
2nd Madison, European Track Championships
1954
1st Six Days of Berlin (with Dominique Forlini)
