= Blaudeix =

Commune in Nouvelle-Aquitaine, France

- Part of Parsac
- Coat of arms
- Location of Blaudeix
- Location within France Location within Nouvelle-Aquitaine
- Coordinates: 46°13′53″N 2°05′06″E
- Country: France
- Region: Nouvelle-Aquitaine
- Department: Creuse
- Arrondissement: Aubusson
- Canton: Gouzon
- Commune: Parsac
- Area^{1}: 6.9 km^{2} (2.7 sq mi)
- Elevation: 450 m (1,480 ft)
- Highest elevation: 479 m (1,572 ft)
- Lowest elevation: 359 m (1,178 ft)
- Population (2022): 110
  - Density: 16/km^{2} (41/sq mi)
- Time zone: UTC+01:00 (CET)
  - Summer (DST): UTC+02:00 (CEST)
- Postal code: 23140
- ^{1} French Land Register data, which excludes lakes, ponds, glaciers > 1 km^{2} (0.386 sq mi or 247 acres) and river estuaries.

Blaudeix is a former commune in the Creuse department in the Nouvelle-Aquitaine region in central France. It was merged with Parsac-Rimondeix to form Parsac on 1 January 2025.

== Geography ==
A farming area comprising a small village and several hamlets situated some 12 miles (19 km) northeast of Guéret, at the junction of the D9 and the D81.

== Sights ==
- The church, dating from the fourteenth century.
- Remnants of a priory of the Knights of St. John.
- Two old mills.

== See also ==
- Communes of the Creuse department
