= 1948 UCI Road World Championships – Men's road race =

Men's Individual Road Race
1948 UCI Road World Championships
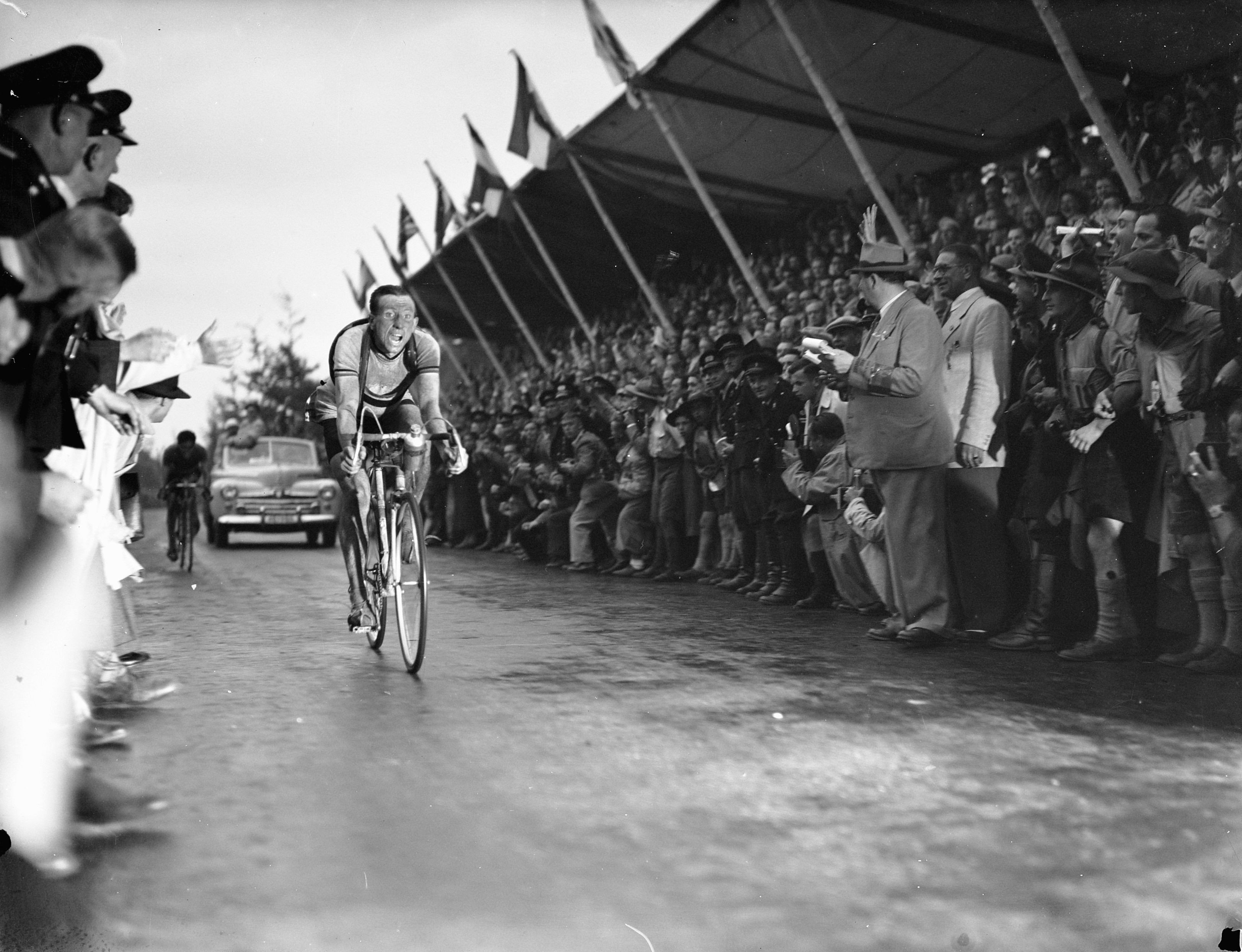
- Briek Schotte winning the 1948 Professional Road World Championship

Race details
- Dates: 22 August 1948
- Stages: 1
- Distance: 266 km (165.3 mi)
- Winning time: 7h 30' 42"

Results
	Winner	Briek Schotte (BEL)	(Belgium)
	Second	Apo Lazaridès (FRA)	(France)
	Third	Lucien Teisseire (FRA)	(France)

The men's road race at the 1948 UCI Road World Championships was the 15th edition of the event. The race took place on Sunday 22 August 1948 in Valkenburg, the Netherlands. The race was won by Briek Schotte of Belgium.

The race was strongly influenced by rivalry between Fausto Coppi and Gino Bartali, among the favourite athletes participating. The two only focused on controlling each other, not pursuing the victory. They were later heavy criticised in Italy for this. The Italian Cycling Federation even suspended them from competitive activity for two months but was cancelled after a month. So Coppi was able to win the Giro di Lombardia in October 1948.

Newsreel of the 1948 Professional Road World Championship (in Dutch)

== Final classification ==
General classification

Rank	Rider	Time
1st place, gold medalist(s)	Briek Schotte (BEL)	7h 30' 42"
2nd place, silver medalist(s)	Apo Lazaridès (FRA)	+ 1"
3rd place, bronze medalist(s)	Lucien Teisseire (FRA)	+ 3' 41"
4	Luciano Maggini (ITA)	+ 6' 33"
5	Marcel Dupont (BEL)	+ 6' 59"
6	Mario Ricci (ITA)	+ 7' 43"
7	Ferdinand Kübler (SUI)	+ 9' 53"
8	Vito Ortelli (ITA)	+ 13' 00"
9	Raymond Impanis (BEL)	+ 13' 00"
10	Huub Syen (NED)	+ 14' 24"
