= 1942 Tour of Flanders =

Race details
- Dates: April 6, 1926
- Stages: 1
- Distance: 226 km (140.4 mi)
- Winning time: 6h 26' 00"

Results
	Winner	Briek Schotte (BEL)
	Second	Georges Claes (BEL)
	Third	Robert Van Eenaeme (BEL)

The 26th edition of the Tour of Flanders cycling classic race was held on Sunday, 6 April 1942. Belgian Briek Schotte won the Monument for a first time. Of the 67 starting cyclists, 22 reached the finish.

== Route ==
The race started in Ghent and finished there, in the Kuipke velodrome, totaling 226 km (140 miles).

The course featured 3 categorized climbs:

- Kwaremont
- Kruisberg
- Edelareberg

== Race Report ==
As he usually preferred, Briek Schotte escaped from a group earlier. He was able to stay in front and arrived solo in the velodrome. Schotte completed the race with an average of 35,13 km/h.

== General classification ==
=== Final general classification ===
Rank	Rider	Team	Time
1	Briek Schotte (BEL)	Thompson	6h 26' 00"
2	Georges Claes (BEL)	Helyett–Hutchinson	+ 5"
3	Robert Van Eenaeme (BEL)	Individual	s.t.
4	Sylvain Grysolle (BEL)	Dilecta–Wolber	s.t.
5	Jules Lowie (BEL)	Mercier–Hutchinson	s.t.
6	André Declerck (BEL)	Individual	s.t.
7	Frans Bonduel (BEL)	Dilecta–Wolber	+ 25"
8	André Maelbrancke (BEL)	Alcyon–Dunlop	1' 25"
9	Albert Hendrickx (BEL)	Alcyon–Dunlop	1' 40"
10	Michel Hermie (BEL)	Individual	3' 10"
