= Parsac-Rimondeix =

Commune in Nouvelle-Aquitaine, France

- Part of Parsac
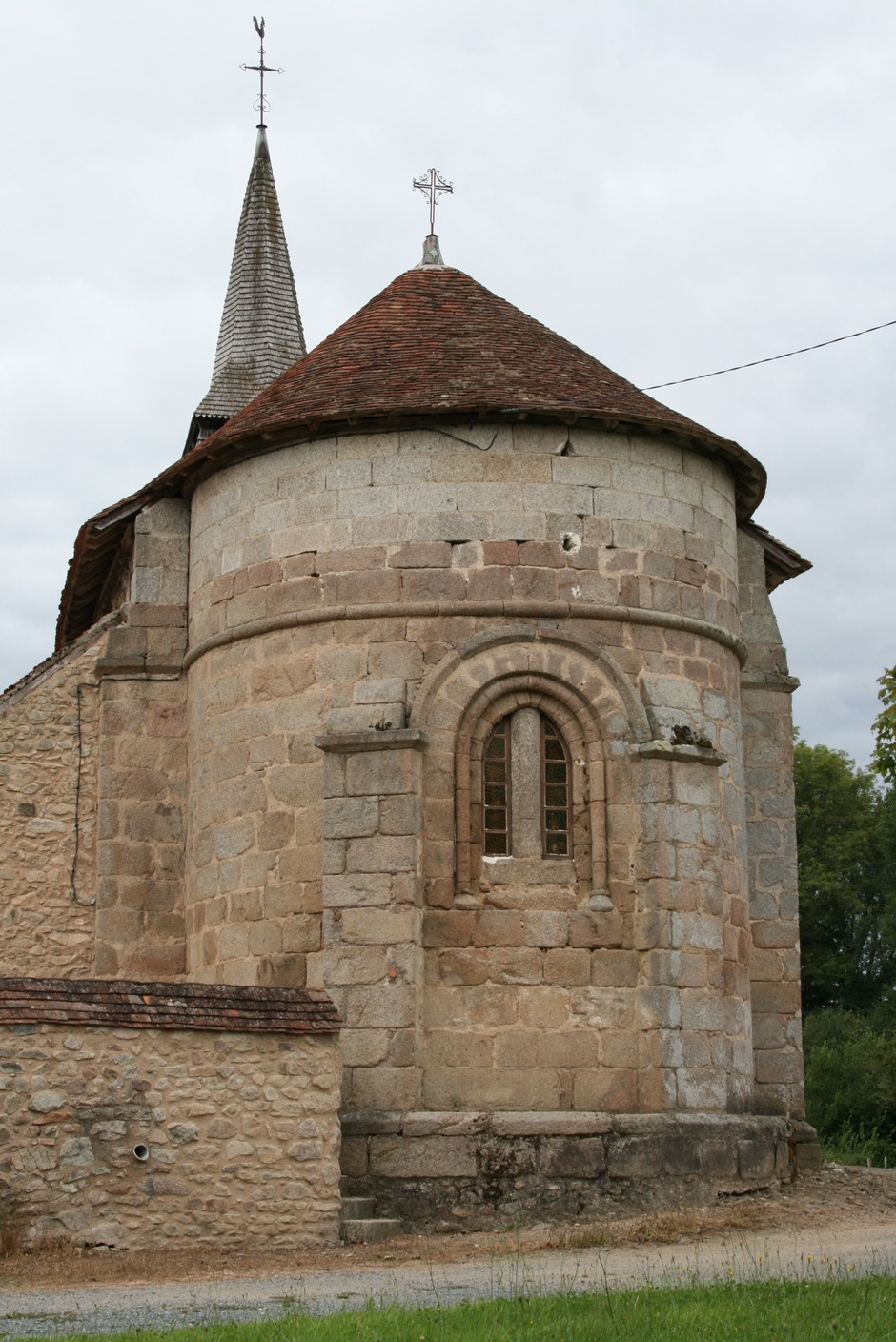
- The church of Rimondeix
- Location of Parsac-Rimondeix
- Location within France Location within Nouvelle-Aquitaine
- Coordinates: 46°12′11″N 2°09′04″E
- Country: France
- Region: Nouvelle-Aquitaine
- Department: Creuse
- Arrondissement: Aubusson
- Canton: Gouzon
- Commune: Parsac
- Area^{1}: 47.02 km^{2} (18.15 sq mi)
- Population (2022): 713
  - Density: 15.2/km^{2} (39.3/sq mi)
- Time zone: UTC+01:00 (CET)
  - Summer (DST): UTC+02:00 (CEST)
- Postal code: 23140
- ^{1} French Land Register data, which excludes lakes, ponds, glaciers > 1 km^{2} (0.386 sq mi or 247 acres) and river estuaries.

Parsac-Rimondeix (Auvergnat: Parçac e Rimondés) is a former commune in the Creuse department of central France. It was established on 1 January 2016 by the merger of the former communes of Parsac and Rimondeix. It was merged with Blaudeix to form Parsac on 1 January 2025.

== See also ==
- Communes of the Creuse department
