= Bernard Franken =

Dutch cyclist

Personal information
- Born: 5 February 1914 Antwerp, Belgium
- Died: 4 April 2001 (aged 87) Sint-Niklaas, Belgium

Cycling career
- Sport: Cycling
- Role: Rider

Bernard Franken (5 February 1914 – 4 April 2001) was a Dutch racing cyclist. He rode in the 1948 Tour de France.
