= Henk de Hoog =

Dutch cyclist (1918–1973)

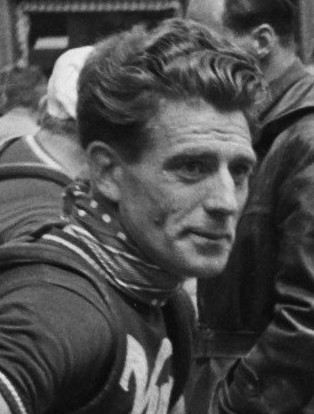
- Henk de Hoog (1952)

Personal information
- Born: 12 August 1918 Amsterdam, Netherlands
- Died: 8 May 1973 (aged 54) Amstelveen, Netherlands

Cycling career
- Sport: Cycling
- Role: Rider

Henk de Hoog (12 August 1918 – 8 May 1973) was a Dutch racing cyclist. He rode in the 1948 and 1949 Tour de France.
