= Octave Dayen =

French cyclist

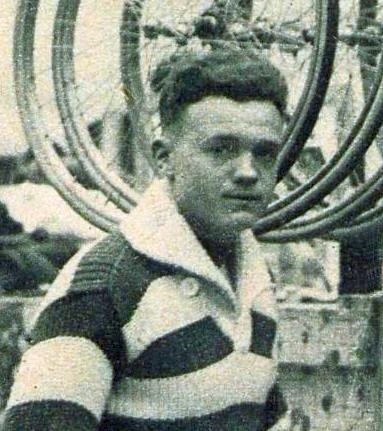

Personal information
- Born: 6 June 1906 Parsac, France
- Died: 14 September 1987 (aged 81) Parsac, France

Cycling career
- Sport: Cycling

Octave Dayen (6 June 1906 – 14 September 1987) was a French cyclist. He competed in four events at the 1928 Summer Olympics.
