= Georges Senfftleben =

French cyclist

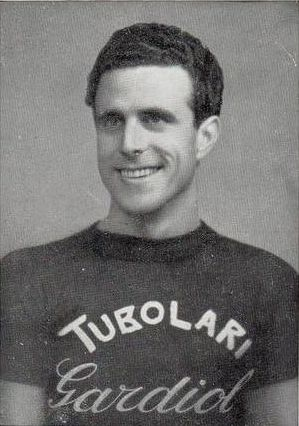
- Senfftleben in 1948.

Personal information
- Full name: Georges Senfftleben
- Nickname: Sneff
- Born: 19 December 1922 Clamart, France
- Died: 24 August 1998 (aged 75) Èze, France

Cycling career
- Sport: Cycling
- Discipline: Track
- Role: Rider
- Rider type: Sprinter

Georges Senfftleben (19 December 1922 in Clamart – 24 August 1998 in Èze) was a French track cyclist.

== Major results ==
1944
1st National Sprint Championships
1st Grand Prix de Paris
1946
2nd World Sprint Championships
1947
1st National Sprint Championships
3rd World Sprint Championships
1948
1st National Sprint Championships
3rd World Sprint Championships
1951
1st National Sprint Championships
1952
1st Six Says of Hanover (with Émile Carrara)
1st Six Days of Saint-Étienne (with Émile Carrara)
2nd World Sprint Championships
1953
2nd European Madison Championships
1954
1st Six Days of Paris (with Roger Godeau)
1st Six Days of Aarhus (with Roger Godeau)
1st Six Days of Brussels (with Dominique Forlini)
1955
1st Six Days of Frankfurt (with Dominique Forlini)
1st European Madison Championships (with Dominique Forlini)
1st Prix Dupré-Lapize
1956
1st Six Days of Copenhagen (with Dominique Forlini)
1958
2nd European Madison Championships
