= Nello Sforacchi =

Italian cyclist

Personal information
- Born: 9 April 1922 Scandiano, Italy
- Died: 6 October 2016 (aged 94)

Cycling career
- Sport: Cycling
- Role: Rider

Nello Sforacchi (9 April 1922 – 6 October 2016) was an Italian racing cyclist. He rode in the 1948 Tour de France.
