= François Hélary =

French cyclist

Personal information
- Born: 14 March 1924 Morlaix, France
- Died: 29 August 1995 (aged 71) Dreux, France

Cycling career
- Sport: Cycling
- Role: Rider

François Hélary (14 March 1924 – 29 August 1995) was a French racing cyclist. He rode in the 1948 Tour de France.
