= Rimondeix =

Commune in Creuse, France

- Part of Parsac-Rimondeix
- Location of Rimondeix
- Location within France Location within Nouvelle-Aquitaine
- Coordinates: 46°13′47″N 2°06′10″E
- Country: France
- Region: Nouvelle-Aquitaine
- Department: Creuse
- Arrondissement: Guéret
- Canton: Gouzon
- Commune: Parsac-Rimondeix
- Area^{1}: 8.03 km^{2} (3.10 sq mi)
- Elevation: 452 m (1,483 ft)
- Highest elevation: 444 m (1,457 ft)
- Lowest elevation: 353 m (1,158 ft)
- Population (2022): 84
  - Density: 10/km^{2} (27/sq mi)
- Time zone: UTC+01:00 (CET)
  - Summer (DST): UTC+02:00 (CEST)
- Postal code: 23140
- ^{1} French Land Register data, which excludes lakes, ponds, glaciers > 1 km^{2} (0.386 sq mi or 247 acres) and river estuaries.

Rimondeix (Auvergnat: Rimondés) is a former commune in the Creuse department in the Limousin region in central France. On 1 January 2016, it was merged into the new commune Parsac-Rimondeix.

== Geography ==
A small farming area, comprising the village and two hamlets situated some 11 miles (18 km) northeast of Guéret, at the junction of the D9 and the D66 roads.

== Sights ==
- The church, dating from the twelfth century.

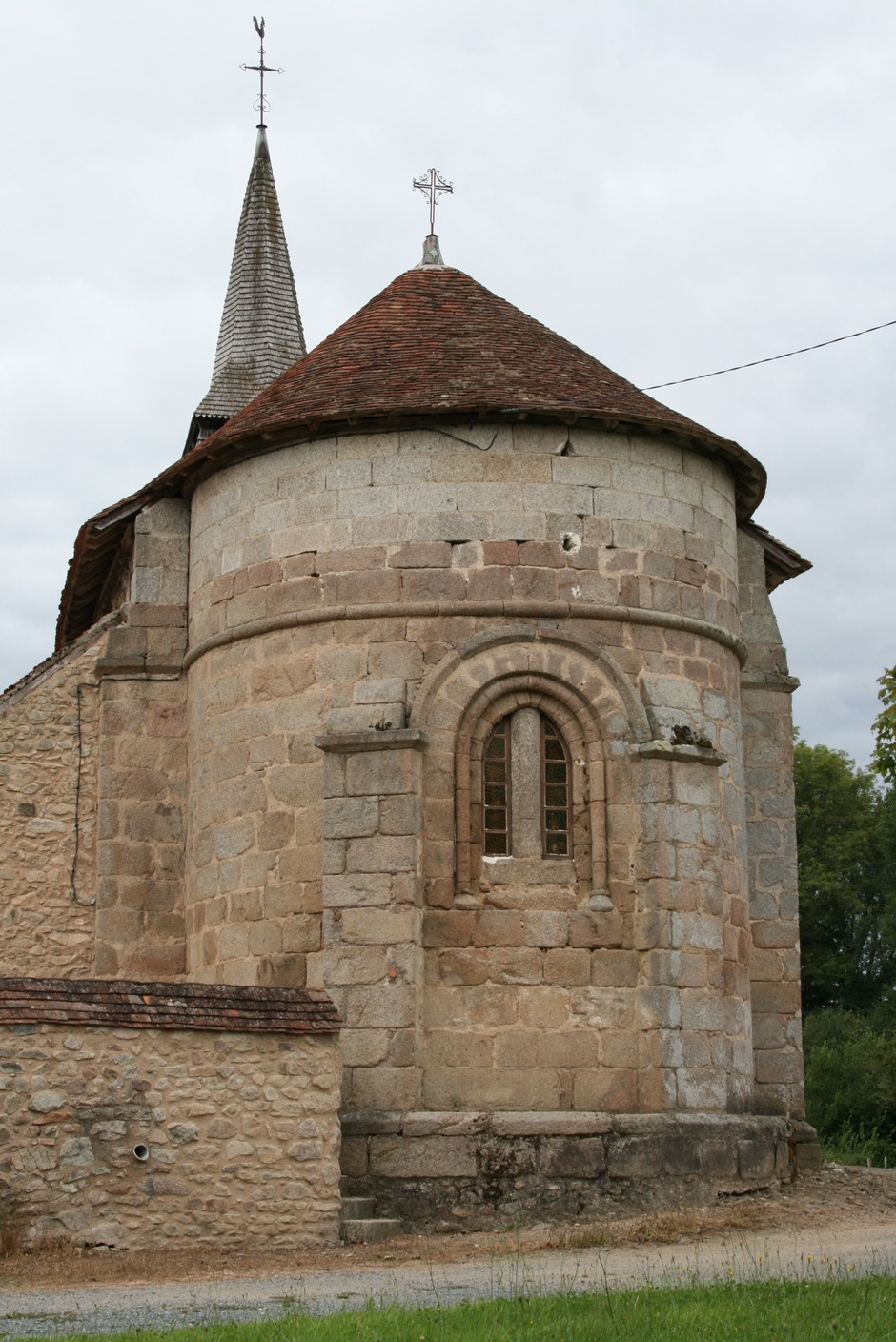
Rimondeix church

== See also ==
- Communes of the Creuse department
