= Maurice Carpentier =

French cyclist

Personal information
- Born: 22 June 1921 Bolbec, France
- Died: 4 May 2011 (aged 89) Coaraze, France

Cycling career
- Sport: Cycling
- Role: Rider

Maurice Carpentier (22 June 1921 – 4 May 2011) was a French racing cyclist. He rode in the 1948 Tour de France.
