= Maurice Lauze =

French cyclist

Personal information
- Born: 1 September 1922 Tizi Ouzou, Algeria
- Died: 28 April 2017 (aged 94) Istres, France

Cycling career
- Sport: Cycling
- Role: Rider

Maurice Lauze (1 September 1922 – 28 April 2017) was a French racing cyclist. He rode in the 1948 Tour de France.
