= Roger Aeschlimann =

Swiss cyclist

Personal information
- Born: 24 September 1923 Switzerland
- Died: 4 May 2008 (aged 84) Valais, Switzerland

Cycling career
- Sport: Cycling
- Role: Rider

Roger Aeschlimann (24 September 1923 – 4 May 2008) was a Swiss racing cyclist. He rode in the 1948 and 1949 Tour de France.
