= Jean Van Buggenhout =

Belgian cyclist

Personal information
- Born: 15 January 1905 Schaerbeek, Belgium
- Died: 1 June 1974 (aged 69) Schaerbeek, Belgium

Cycling career
- Sport: Cycling

Jean Van Buggenhout (15 January 1905 – 1 June 1974) was a Belgian cyclist. He competed in the team pursuit event at the 1928 Summer Olympics.
