= Florent Rondelé =

Belgian cyclist

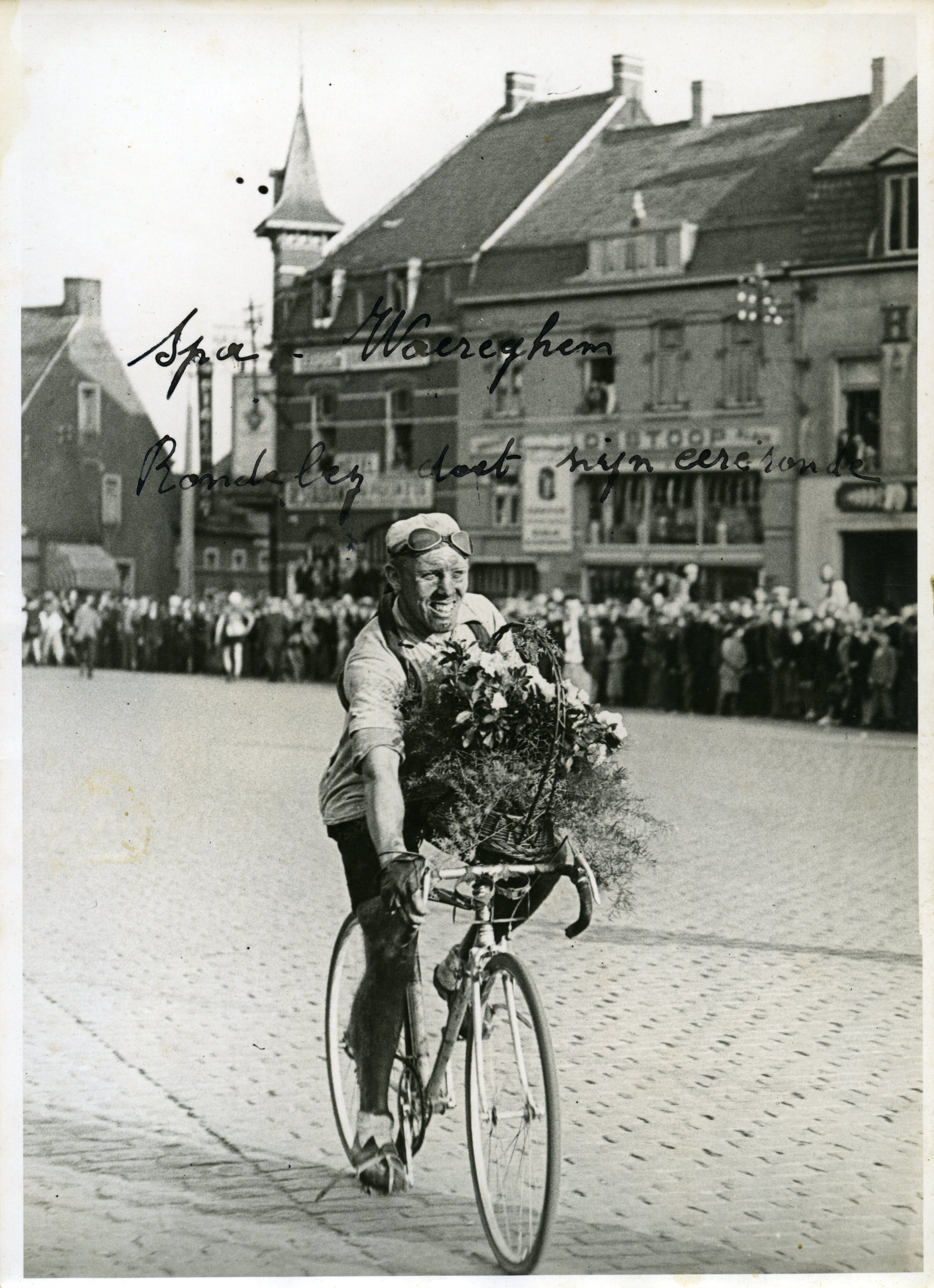
- Florent Rondelé in Waregem after winning Dwars door Vlaanderen, 1948

Personal information
- Born: 13 January 1922 Maarke-Kerkem, Belgium
- Died: 13 December 2000 (aged 78) Ypres, Belgium

Cycling career
- Sport: Cycling
- Role: Rider

Florent Rondelé (13 January 1922 – 13 December 2000) was a Belgian racing cyclist. He rode in the 1948 Tour de France.
