= Emiel Rogiers =

Belgian cyclist

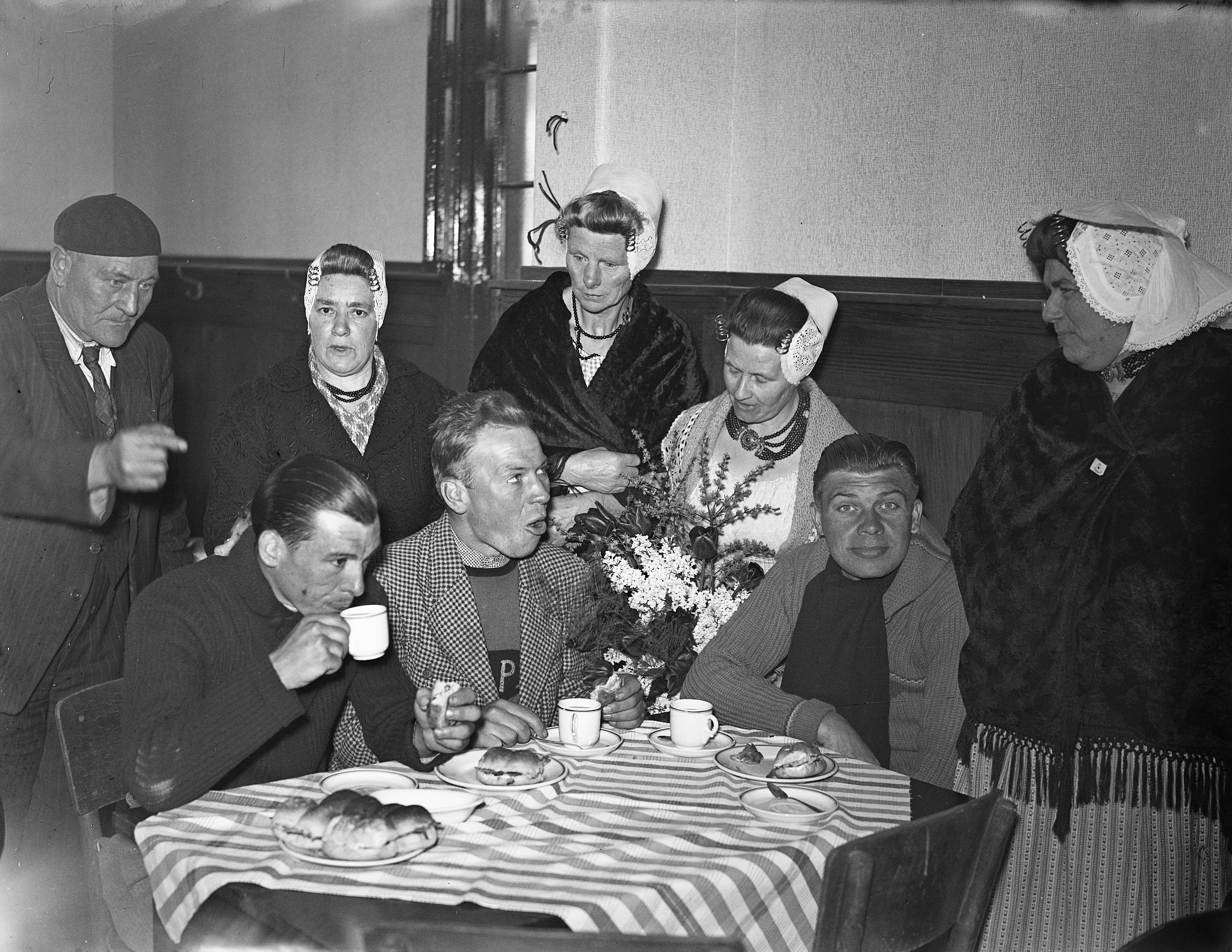
- Rogiers (right) in 1948

Personal information
- Born: 15 March 1923 Aalst, Belgium
- Died: 5 December 1998 (aged 75) Ninove, Belgium

Cycling career
- Sport: Cycling
- Role: Rider

Emiel Rogiers (15 March 1923 – 5 December 1998) was a Belgian racing cyclist. He rode in the 1948 Tour de France.
