= Nouvion-le-Comte =

- Commune
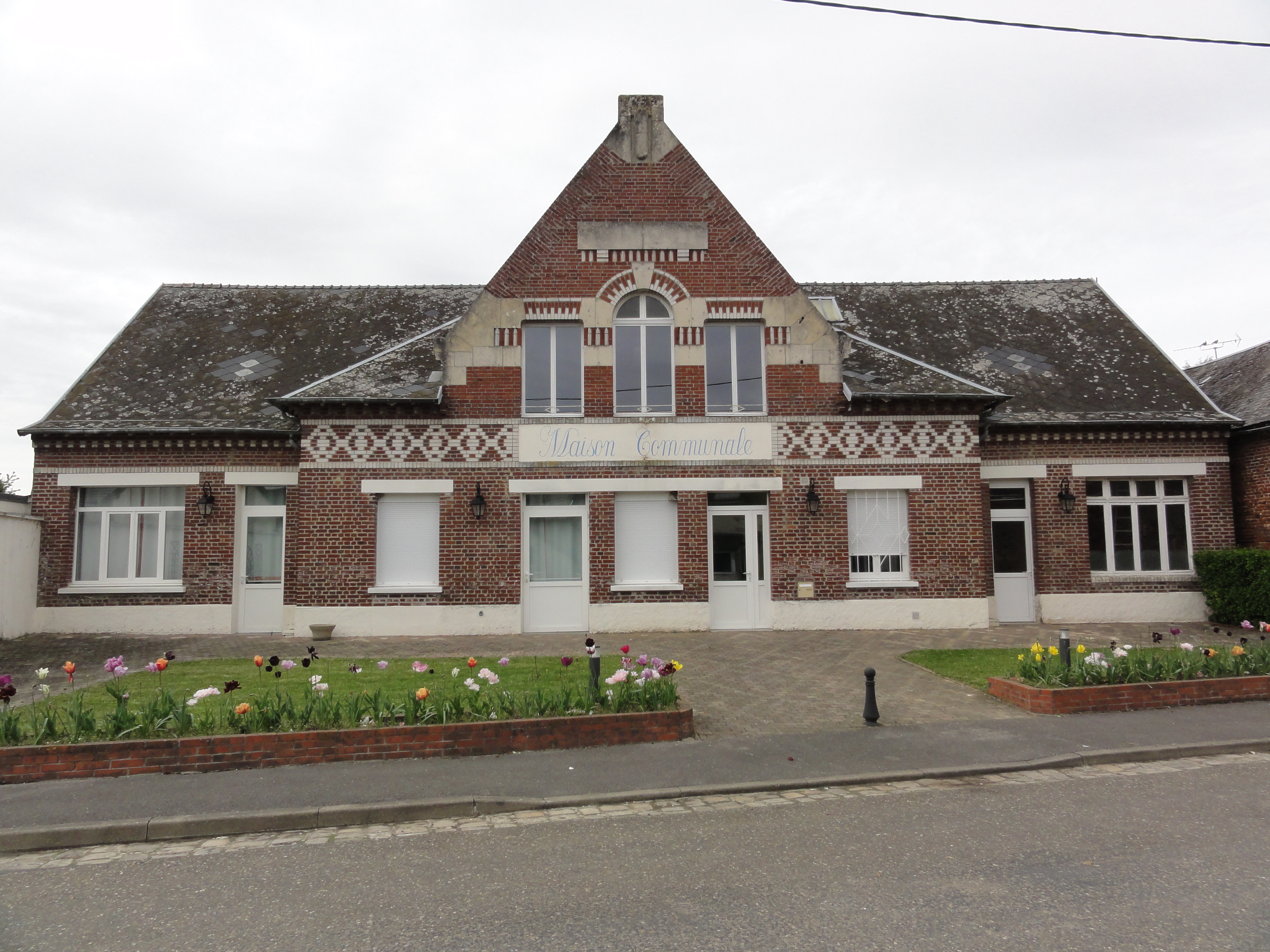
- The town hall of Nouvion-le-Comte
- Location of Nouvion-le-Comte
- Location within France Location within Hauts-de-France
- Coordinates: 49°41′56″N 3°27′47″E
- Country: France
- Region: Hauts-de-France
- Department: Aisne
- Arrondissement: Laon
- Canton: Marle
- Intercommunality: Pays de la Serre

Government
  - Mayor (2026–32): Hervé Gayraud
- Area^{1}: 7.98 km^{2} (3.08 sq mi)
- Elevation: 95 m (312 ft)
- Highest elevation: 117 m (384 ft)
- Lowest elevation: 52 m (171 ft)
- Population (2023): 239
  - Density: 29.9/km^{2} (77.6/sq mi)
- Time zone: UTC+01:00 (CET)
  - Summer (DST): UTC+02:00 (CEST)
- INSEE/Postal code: 02560 /02800
- ^{1} French Land Register data, which excludes lakes, ponds, glaciers > 1 km^{2} (0.386 sq mi or 247 acres) and river estuaries.

Nouvion-le-Comte (French pronunciation: [nuvjɔ̃ lə kɔ̃t]) is a commune in the Aisne department in Hauts-de-France in northern France.

== Population ==
Historical population
Year	Pop.	±% p.a.
1968	325	—
1975	285	−1.86%
1982	265	−1.03%
1990	281	+0.74%
1999	275	−0.24%
2007	275	+0.00%
2012	277	+0.15%
2017	249	−2.11%
2023	239	−0.68%
Source: INSEE

== See also ==
- Communes of the Aisne department
