= Daniel Orts =

French cyclist

Personal information
- Born: 10 January 1924 Palavas-les-Flots, France
- Died: 5 November 2013 (aged 89) Nîmes, France

Cycling career
- Sport: Cycling
- Role: Rider

Daniel Orts (10 January 1924 – 5 November 2013) was a French racing cyclist. He rode in the 1948 Tour de France.
