= Cor Bakker (cyclist) =

Dutch cyclist (1918–2011)

Personal information
- Born: 2 October 1918 Zaandam, Netherlands
- Died: 18 December 2011 (aged 93) Zaandam, Netherlands

Cycling career
- Sport: Cycling
- Role: Rider

Cor Bakker (2 October 1918 – 18 December 2011) was a Dutch racing cyclist. He rode in the 1948 Tour de France.
