= Jean Lauk =

French cyclist

Personal information
- Born: 15 September 1918 Paris, France
- Died: 15 October 1966 (aged 48) Paris, France

Cycling career
- Sport: Cycling
- Role: Rider

Jean Lauk (15 September 1918 – 15 October 1966) was a French racing cyclist. He rode in the 1948 Tour de France.
