= Raymond Guégan =

French cyclist

Personal information
- Born: 7 December 1921 Laon, France
- Died: 27 April 2007 (aged 85) Laon, France

Cycling career
- Sport: Cycling
- Role: Rider

Raymond Guégan (7 December 1921 – 27 April 2007) was a French racing cyclist. He rode in the 1947 and 1948 Tour de France.
