= Victor Pernac =

French cyclist (1920–2016)

Personal information
- Born: 23 December 1920 Rawicz, Poland
- Died: 27 March 2016 (aged 94) Marseille, France

Cycling career
- Sport: Cycling
- Role: Rider

Victor Pernac (23 December 1920 – 27 March 2016) was a French racing cyclist. He rode in the 1947 and 1948 Tour de France. He finished in eighth place in the 1946 Paris–Roubaix.
