= Adolph Verschueren =

Belgian cyclist

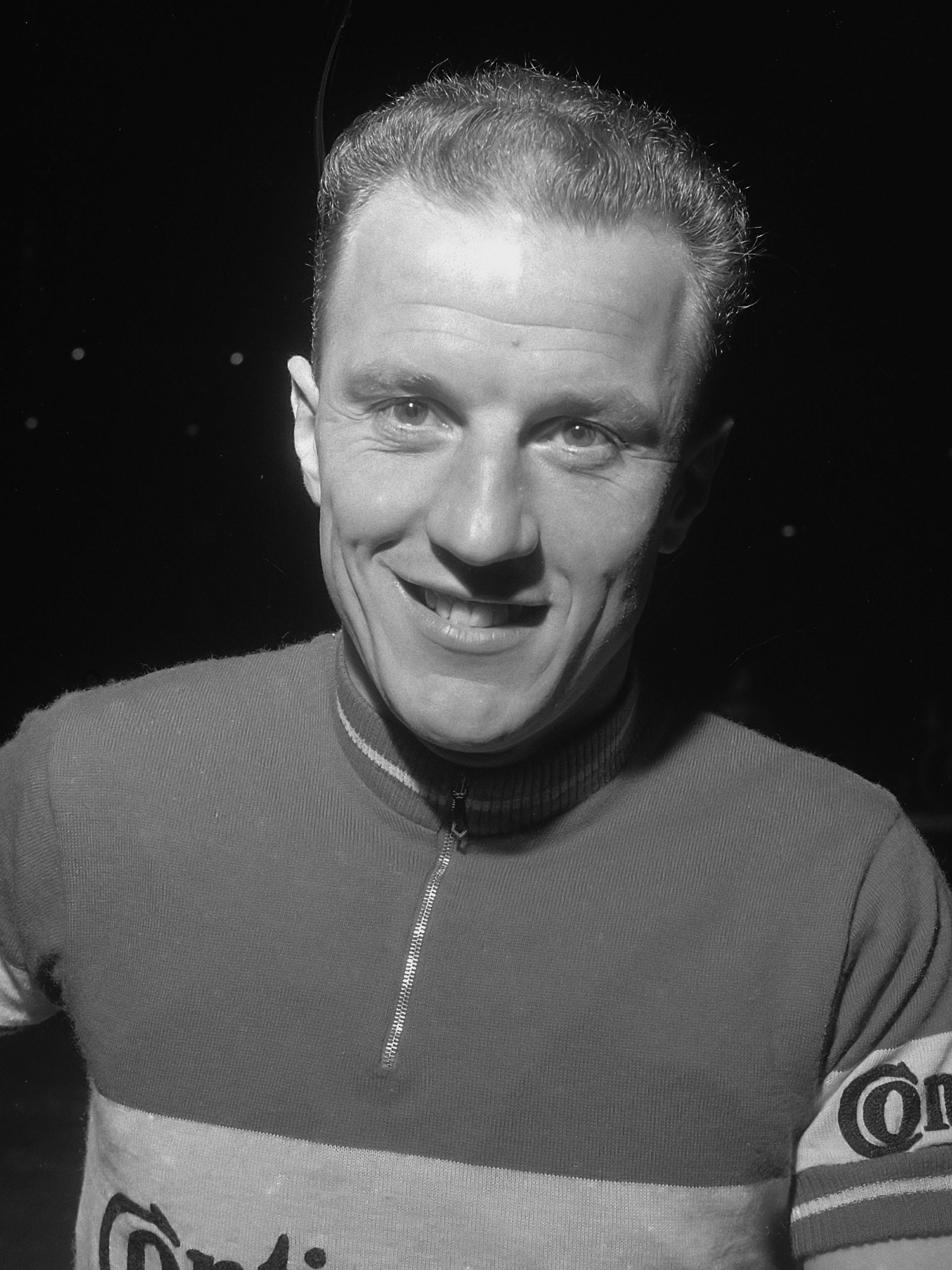
- Dolf Verschueren (1957)

Personal information
- Born: 10 June 1922 Deurne, Belgium
- Died: 30 April 2004 (aged 81) Arendonk, Belgium

Sport
- Sport: Cycling
Medal record
Representing Belgium
Motor-paced World Championships
Gold medal – first place	1952 Paris	Professionals
Gold medal – first place	1953 Zurich	Professionals
Gold medal – first place	1954 Cologne	Professionals

Adolph Verschueren (also Adolf; 10 June 1922 – 30 April 2004) was a Belgian cyclist. As a road cyclist, he won the Tour of Flanders in 1942 and the sixth stage of Tour de Suisse in 1949.

As a track cyclist, he competed in motor-paced racing in the professionals category. He won the European championships in 1951, 1953, 1956 and 1958 and three consecutive world championships in 1952–1954. He finished in second place in the European championships in 1952, 1954 and 1955. In 1954 he set a world record in 1 hour race (58.85 km). He also finished second in the 1947 Paris–Roubaix and rode in the 1948 Tour de France.

He is unrelated to Theo Verschueren, another motor-paced racing world champion from Belgium.
