= Roger Piel =

French cyclist

Personal information
- Born: 28 June 1921
- Died: 17 August 2002 (aged 81)

Cycling career
- Sport: Cycling
- Role: Rider

Roger Piel (28 June 1921 – 17 August 2002) was a French racing cyclist. He rode in the 1951 Tour de France.

== Road Racing Palmarès ==
1944, 1st in the National Route Criterion 1951, Winner of a stage in the Côte d'Or Circuit Results in the Tour de France 1951. Withdrew (Stage 9)
