= Georges Claes =

Belgian cyclist

Georges Claes (7 January 1920, Boutersem - 14 March 1994) was a Belgian racing cyclist. He won Paris–Roubaix in 1946 and 1947. He finished in third place in the 1948 Paris–Roubaix.

Georges Claes
