= Amédée Rolland =

French cyclist

Personal information
- Born: 22 January 1914 Nice, France
- Died: 9 June 2000 (aged 86) Nice, France

Cycling career
- Sport: Cycling
- Role: Rider

Amédée Rolland (22 January 1914 – 9 June 2000) was a French racing cyclist. He rode in the 1948 Tour de France.
