= Maurice De Muer =

French cyclist (1921–2012)

Personal information
- Born: 4 October 1921 Potigny, France
- Died: 4 March 2012 (aged 90) Seillans, France

Cycling career
- Sport: Cycling
- Role: Rider

Professional team
- 1943-1951: Peugeot–Dunlop

Managerial teams
- 1965-68: Pelforth - Sauvage - Lejeune
- 1969-74: Bic
- 1975-82: Peugeot

Major wins
- Paris–Camembert (1944)

Maurice De Muer (4 October 1921 – 4 March 2012) was a French cyclist who rode as a professional between 1943 and 1951 and later became a cycling team manager.

He won Paris–Camembert in 1944 and finished second in the 1946 edition of Paris–Nice. He also rode in the 1947 and 1948 Tour de France.

De Muer is mostly remembered as a cycling team manager. He started by supporting a small team, Pelforth-Wild-Lejeune, recruiting aggressive riders. This team was allowed to participate in the Tour de France in 1963. He became noticed as a sports director when in 1964 one of his cyclists Georges Groussard wore the yellow jersey for 10 days. He then led the team Bic (1969-1974) with which he led the fiery Luis Ocaña to victory in the Tour de France in 1973. He managed the Peugeot cycling team from 1975 to 1982.

== Major results ==
- 1941
  - Grand Prix de Fourmies
- 1943
  - 2^{e} Wanferçée-Baulet (BEL)
- 1944
  - Paris–Camembert (Trophée Lepetit)
- 1945
  - 8^{e} Paris–Roubaix
- 1946
  - 3^{e} Paris–Tours
  - 2^{e} Paris–Nice
- 1947
  - Grand Prix de l'Écho d'Alger
  - 8^{e} Paris–Roubaix
- 1950
  - Tour de la Manche
