= Louis Caput =

French cyclist (1921–1985)

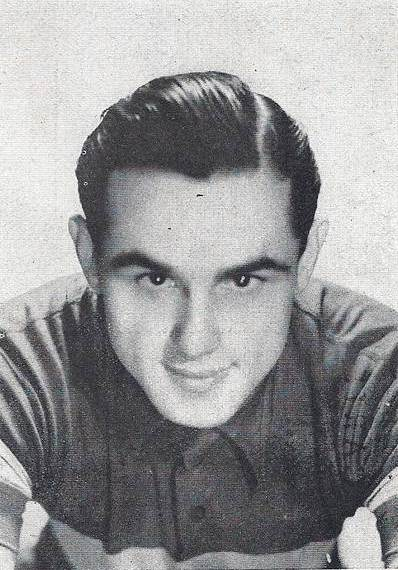
- Born: 23 January 1921; Saint-Maur-des-Fosses, France
- Died: 1 January 1985 (aged 63); Paris, France
- Resting place: Ivry Cemetery, Ivry-sur-Seine
- Cycling career
- Sport: Cycling
- Discipline: Road
- Role: Rider and manager

Professional teams
- 1942-1944: Dilecta-Wolber
- 1945: Genial Lucifer
- 1946-1947: Metropole-Dunlop
- 1948-1950: Olympia-Dunlop
- 1951: Dilecta-Wolber
- 1952: Carrara-Dunlop
- 1953: Gitane-Hutchinson
- 1954: Rochet-Dunlop
- 1955: Arliguie-Hutchinson
- 1956: Saint-Raphael-R. Géminiani
- 1957: Essor-Leroux

Managerial teams
- 1966-1967: Kamomé-Dilecta
- 1968-1969: Frimatic-Viva-De Gribaldy
- 1969: Frimatic-Viva-de Gribaldy-Wolber
- 1970-197: Fagor-Mercier
- 1972-1975: Gan-Mercier
- 1976: Gan-Mercier France
- 1977-1978: Miko-Mercier

Major wins
- 2 stages Tour de France; Paris–Tours (1948)

Louis Caput (23 January 1921 - 1 January 1985) was a French professional racing cyclist and then team manager. He was born in Saint-Maur-des-Fosses, and won Paris–Tours in 1948, and two stages of the Tour de France. He was national champion in 1946.

== Career ==
Caput rode as a professional from 1942 to 1957. René de Latour said:

Everybody liked Louis Caput, who became known to the crowds as P'tit Louis. And not only was Caput a likeable rider, he was a clever one who knew his job perfectly and I don't think I have ever seen him make a serious mistake on the road. Whenever he got into a break, he was the boss, the ruler of it. Little Louis was a great general of the pelotons, shouting encouragement, picking the right length for the relays and giving orders to his companions of the breakaway.

He rode the Tour de France nine times between 1947 and 1956, failing to finish six times but coming 45th in 1951, 54th in 1955, and 56th in 1956. He won stages in 1949 and 1955. He came third in the Tour of Flanders of 1950.

== Retirement ==
Caput stopped racing in 1957 and went into the real estate business in Vincennes, an eastern suburb of Paris. In 1966 he became directeur sportif of a new team, Kamomé-Dilecta, sponsored by a maker of Japanese washing machines and a French bicycle company that had last had a team in the 1930s. The team soon ran into trouble and riders were no longer paid. "We were paid à la musette, which means only if we won. Kamomé was in financial difficulties," said one of the riders, Raymond Lebreton.

The French businessman, Jean de Gribaldy, took over sponsorship the following year with Frimatic, another maker of washing machines, as main backer. Caput went with him to run the team but, said, Lebreton, his organisation was chaotic. "The de Gribaldy team was badly organised. We were told we were to ride raced only a few hours before they started. It was a bazaar, and I wanted to leave." Caput ran the team from 1968 to 1969. The following year Antonin Magne retired from running the Mercier team, which had lost BP as secondary sponsor. Fagor, a Spanish maker of refrigerators and other household goods, took over. An incidental effect of Caput's arrival as manager is that Raymond Poulidor and the other riders were allowed zips at the necks of their jerseys, something Magne had always thought unhealthy.

== Death and memorial ==
Louis Caput died in Paris on the first day of 1985 and is buried at Ivry Cemetery, Ivry-sur-Seine. A cycling event is organised annually in his honour.

== Major results ==
1942
Circuit d'Auray
1946
France national road race championship
Paris-Reims
1948
Paris–Tours
1949
Ain-Temouchent
GP de l'Echo d'Oran
Tour de France:

Winner stage 9

1952
GP de la Bicicleta Eibarresa
1955
Paris - Limoges
Arras
Tour de France:

Winner stage 14

1956
Montluçon
Circuit des Deux Ponts
