= Robert Mignat =

French cyclist

Personal information
- Born: 29 June 1921 Paris, France
- Died: 16 August 2007 (aged 86) Brest, France

Cycling career
- Sport: Cycling
- Role: Rider

Robert Mignat (29 June 1921 – 16 August 2007) was a French racing cyclist. He rode in the 1948 Tour de France.
