= Briek Schotte =

Belgian cyclist (1919–2004)

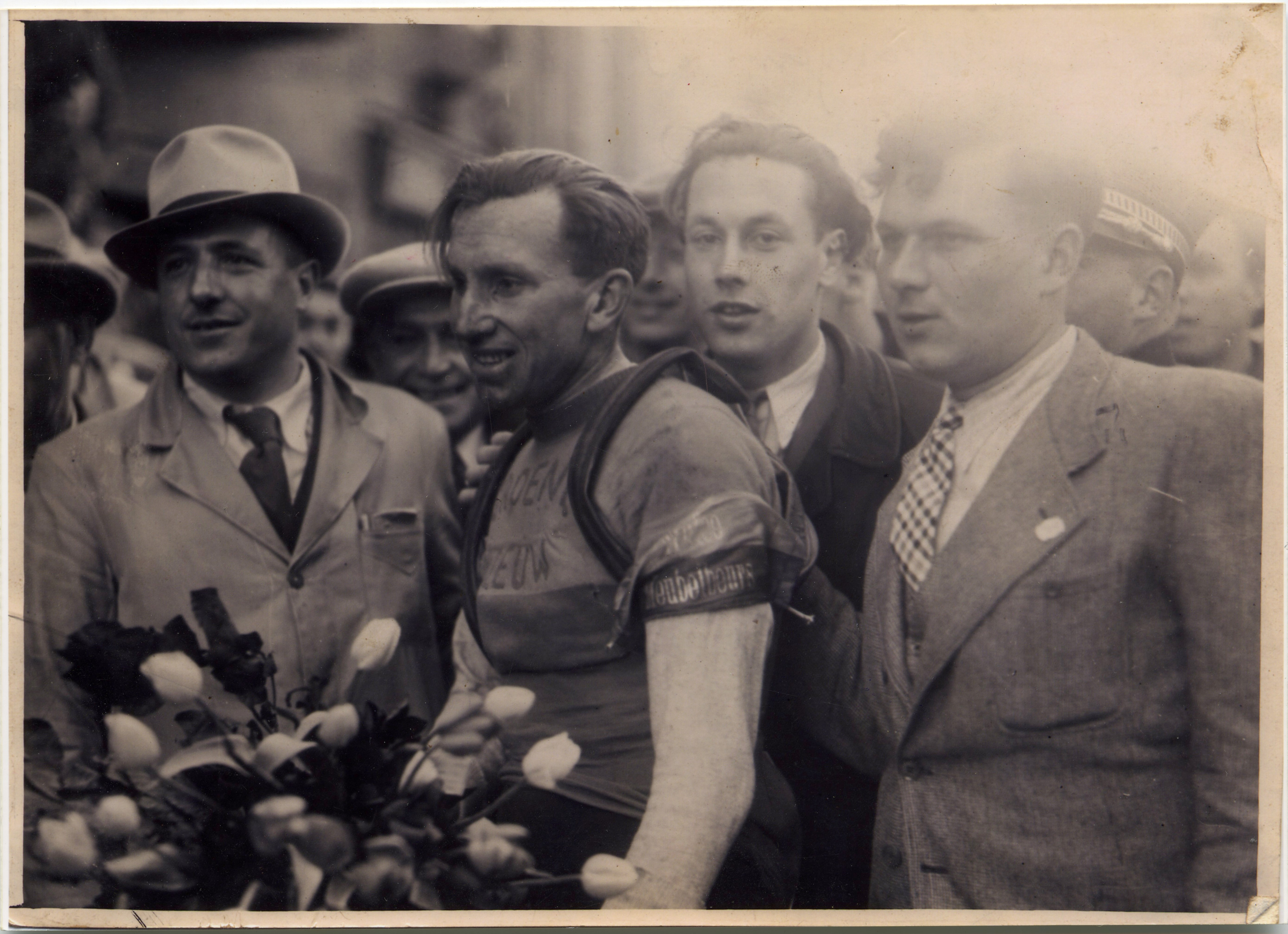
- Schotte after winning the first stage of Dwars door België 1946 (collection: KOERS Museum)

Personal information
- Full name: Alberic Schotte
- Nickname: Briek
- Born: 7 September 1919 Kanegem, Belgium
- Died: 4 April 2004 (aged 84)

Cycling career
- Sport: Cycling
- Discipline: Road
- Role: Rider

Professional teams
- 1939: Mercier
- 1940–1941: Mercier / Groene Leeuw
- 1942: Mercier / Thompson
- 1943: Europe-Dunlop / Thompson
- 1944: Helyett / Trialoux–Wolber
- 1945–1948: Alcyon / Groene Leeuw
- 1949: Alcyon
- 1950–1951: Alcyon / Girardengo-Ursus
- 1952–1955: Alcyon
- 1956: Alcyon / Faema
- 1957: Peugeot
- 1958: Libertas
- 1959: Libertas / Flandria

Major wins
- Grand Tours Tour de France 1 individual stage (1947) One-day races and Classics World Road Race Championships (1948, 1950) Tour of Flanders (1942, 1948) Gent–Wevelgem (1950, 1955) Paris–Tours (1946, 1947) Dwars door België (1953, 1955) Paris-Brussels (1952) Kampioenschap van Vlaanderen (1941, 1954) Omloop der Vlaamse Gewesten (1946) Other Challenge Desgrange-Colombo (1948)
Medal record
Representing Belgium
Men's road bicycle racing
World Championships
Gold medal – first place	1948 Valkenburg	Elite road race
Gold medal – first place	1950 Moerslede	Elite road race

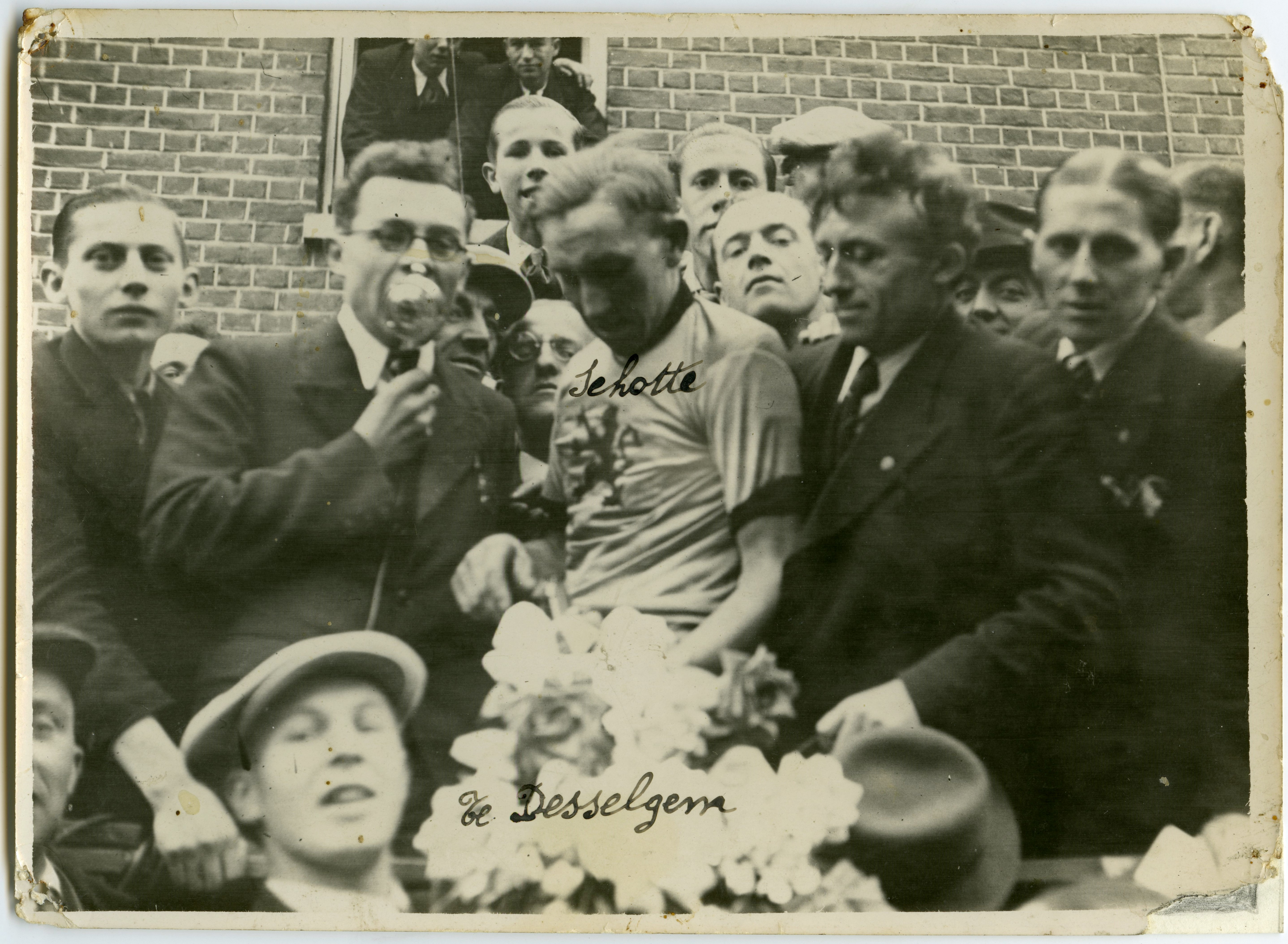
Briek Schotte wins Kampioenschap van Vlaanderen 1941 (Museum of Cycle Racing)

Alberic "Briek" Schotte (7 September 1919 – 4 April 2004) was a Belgian professional road racing cyclist, one of the champions of the 1940s and 1950s. His stamina earned him the nickname "Iron Briek" (IJzeren Briek).

He was world champion in 1948 and 1950, won the last stage of the 1947 Tour de France and finished second in the 1948 Tour, behind Gino Bartali. He twice won the Tour of Flanders (1942, 1948), Paris–Tours (1946, 1947) and Paris–Brussels (1946, 1952). He also won the inaugural Challenge Desgrange-Colombo, a season-long competition to identify the world's best road rider, in 1948. He holds the record with twenty consecutive participations in the Tour of Flanders and in addition to his two victories made the podium on six other occasions. Schotte corresponded to the archetype of the Flandrien, the diligent farm boy who competes against better equipped and guided riders from France and Italy. Although he himself put that into perspective: "Because of my position on the bike, I gave the impression that I was suffering more than was actually the case".

After retirement in 1959, he was a team coach for 30 years, mostly for Flandria where he also served as Directeur Sportif for many years. Riders such as Rik Van Looy, Herman Van Springel, Freddy Maertens, Eddy Merckx, Sean Kelly, Joop Zoetemelk, Michel Pollentier, Walter Godefroot and Roger De Vlaeminck rode for Schotte at various points during their respective careers. None of these riders would win the Tour de France while riding for Flandria, however Zoetemelk would finish 2nd in 1970 and 1971 while riding under Schotte's direction.

He died on the day of the 2004 Tour of Flanders. The commentators during the race said "God must have been one of Briek's greatest fans".

== Major results ==
1939
1st Overall Tour de l'Ouest
1st GP de Bruxelles
1940
1st Ransart–Beaumont–Ransart
3rd Tour of Flanders
1941
1st Kampioenschap van Vlaanderen
1st Desselgem Koerse
1st Merelbeke
2nd Grote 1-MeiPrijs
3rd GP Stad Zottegem
1942
1st Tour of Flanders
1st Desselgem Koerse
1st Oostkamp
3rd Omloop der Vlaamse Gewesten
1943
1st Desselgem Koerse
3rd La Flèche Française (TTT)
3rd Liège–Bastogne–Liège
1944
1st Wetteren
2nd Tour of Flanders
2nd La Flèche Wallonne
1945
1st Nokere Koerse
1st Tielt–Antwerpen–Tielt
1st Olsene
1st Waregem
2nd Dwars door België
2nd Halle–Ingooigem
2nd Gullegem Koerse
2nd Brussels–Everbeek
2nd Circuit de Paris
3rd Across Paris
3rd Circuit de la Capitale
3rd Brussels–Sint-Truiden
1946
1st Interclubs road race, National Road Championships
1st Omloop Mandel-Leie-Schelde
1st Paris–Tours
1st Overall Tour de Luxembourg

1st Stages 1 & 2

1st Omloop der Vlaamse Gewesten
1st Paris–Brussels
2nd Gullegem Koerse
2nd Halle–Ingooigem
2nd Road race, National Road Championships
3rd Tour of Flanders
3rd Overall Dwars door België

1st Stage 1

3rd Nokere Koerse
1947
1st Interclubs road race, National Road Championships
1st Paris–Tours
1st Stage 21 Tour de France
1st Circuit de la Region Liniere
1st Heule
2nd GP Tielt
3rd GP Stad Vilvoorde
1948
1st Road race, UCI Road World Championships
1st Challenge Desgrange-Colombo
1st Tour of Flanders
2nd Road race, National Road Championships
2nd La Flèche Wallonne
2nd Road race, National Road Championships
2nd Overall Tour de France
1949
1st GP Stad Vilvoorde
3rd Tour of Flanders
1950
1st Road race, UCI Road World Championships
1st Gent–Wevelgem
1st Stage 5 Tour of the Netherlands
1st Critérium Aalst
1st Montenaken
2nd Road race, National Road Championships
2nd Tour of Flanders
2nd Gullegem Koerse
3rd Omloop Het Volk
1951
1st Vijfbergenomloop
3rd Brussels–Izegem
1952
1st Omloop der Zuid-West-Vlaamse Bergen
1st Paris–Brussels
2nd Paris–Tours
3rd Tour of Flanders
1953
1st Overall Dwars door België

1st Stage 2b

1st Grote Bevrijdingsprijs
1st Antwerpen–Luik–Antwerpen
1st Antwerpse Havenpijl
1st Waregem
2nd Paris–Brussels
2nd Overall Tour of Belgium
1954
1st Kampioenschap van Vlaanderen
1st Omloop der drie Provinciën
1st Prix de Soignies
1st Oedelem
2nd Overall Dwars door België
2nd Overall Omloop Mandel-Leie-Schelde
3rd GP Mesen
1955
1st Gent–Wevelgem
1st Overall Dwars door België

1st Stage 2b

1st Scheldeprijs Vlaanderen
2nd Nokere Koerse
2nd Paris–Limoges
1956
1st Overall GP Bali

1st Stage 1

1st Lauwe
1st Boulogne-sur-Mer
1st Stage 1 (TTT) Driedaagse van Antwerpen
2nd Omloop Het Volk
3rd Kuurne–Brussels–Kuurne
1957
1st Interclubs road race, National Road Championships
1st Wervik
1st Langemark
3rd Circuit des Régions Frontalières
1958
1st Interclubs road race, National Road Championships
1st Wervik
1st De Panne
1st Stage 1 (TTT) Driedaagse van Antwerpen
2nd GP Roeselare
3rd Harelbeke–Antwerp–Harelbeke
1959
3rd Dwars door België

== Awards and honours ==
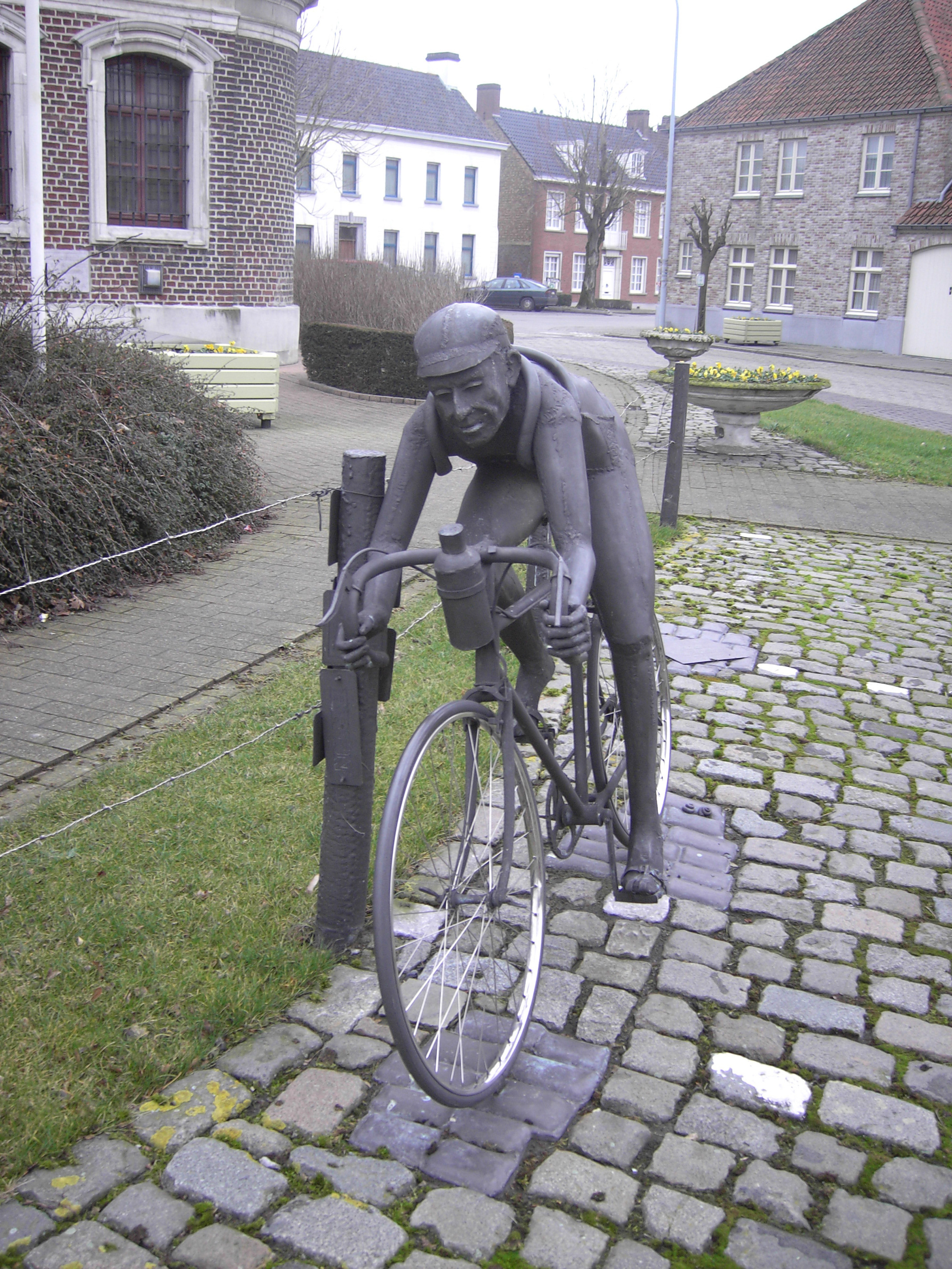
Statue in honour of Schotte in Kanegem

- Challenge Desgrange-Colombo: 1948
- Trophée Edmond Gentil: 1948
- Belgian National Sports Merit Award: 1950
- Swiss AIOCC Trophy: 1972
- Honorary Citizen of Waregem: 1987
- Statue in Kanegem: 1996
- UCI Hall of Fame: 2002
- GP Briek Schotte: since 2004
- Monument and square in Desselgem: 2005
- Bust in Waregem: 2007
- Monument in Moorslede: 2010
- 10 Euro Silver commemorative coin: 2019

== Books ==
- 20 jaren rennersloopbaan van Briek Schotte by Berten Lafosse in 1955, Atlas Kortrijk, 79 p. (Dutch)
- IJzeren Briek: de wielersport zal niet sterven: het levensverhaal van Briek Schotte by André Blancke in 1987, Het Volk, 192 p. (Dutch) ISBN 9063340982
- Briek Schotte by Noël Truyers in 1998, De Eecloonaar, 48 p. (Dutch) ISBN 9074128297
- Briek Schotte: de laatste der Flandriens by Rik Vanwalleghem and Bo Decramer in 1999, Lannoo, 176 p. (Dutch) ISBN 9789020939163
- Briek Schotte: De erfenis van Briek by Rik Vanwalleghem and Anna Luyten in 2011, Kannibaal, 187 p. (Dutch) ISBN 9789081623735
- Briek! De laatste Flandrien by Herman Chevrolet in 2019, De Arbeiderspers, 248 p. (Dutch) ISBN 9789029526425
- Flandrien by Stephan Vanfleteren in 2021, Kannibaal, 132 p. (Dutch) ISBN 9789081623711
