= Maurice Desimpelaere =

Belgian cyclist

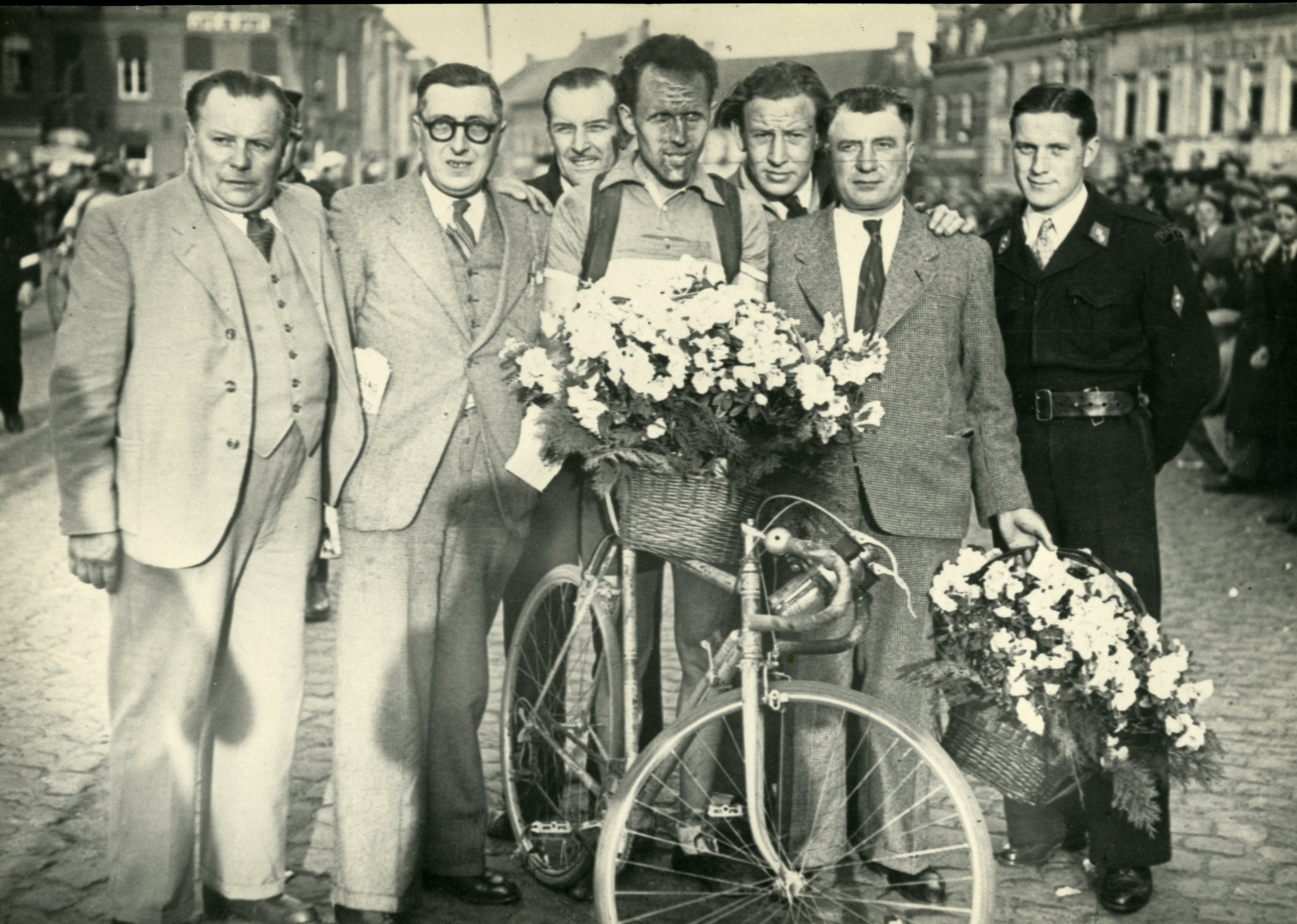
- Maurice Desimpelaere wins Dwars door België 1946 (collection KOERS. Museum of Cycle Races)

Personal information
- Full name: Frederic Maurice Desimpelaere
- Born: 28 May 1920 Ledegem, Belgium
- Died: 30 January 2005 (aged 84) Wevelgem, Belgium

Cycling career
- Sport: Cycling

Professional teams
- 1942 - 1948: Alcyon - Dunlop
- 1949: Ganna - Superga
- 1949: Bertin Wolber
- 1949 - 1950: Alcyon - Dunlop

Major wins
- Paris-Roubaix (1944), Dwars door België (1946), Gent-Wevelgem (1947)

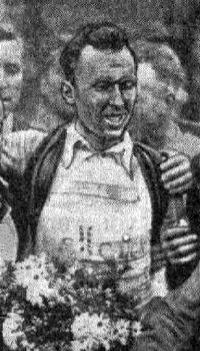
Maurice Desimpelaere after winning Paris-Roubaix (1944)

Maurice Desimpelaere (28 May 1920 – 30 January 2005) was a Belgian cyclist. He won the 1944 Paris–Roubaix and finished in fifth place in the 1945 Paris–Roubaix.
