= Guy Lapébie =

French cyclist (1916–2010)

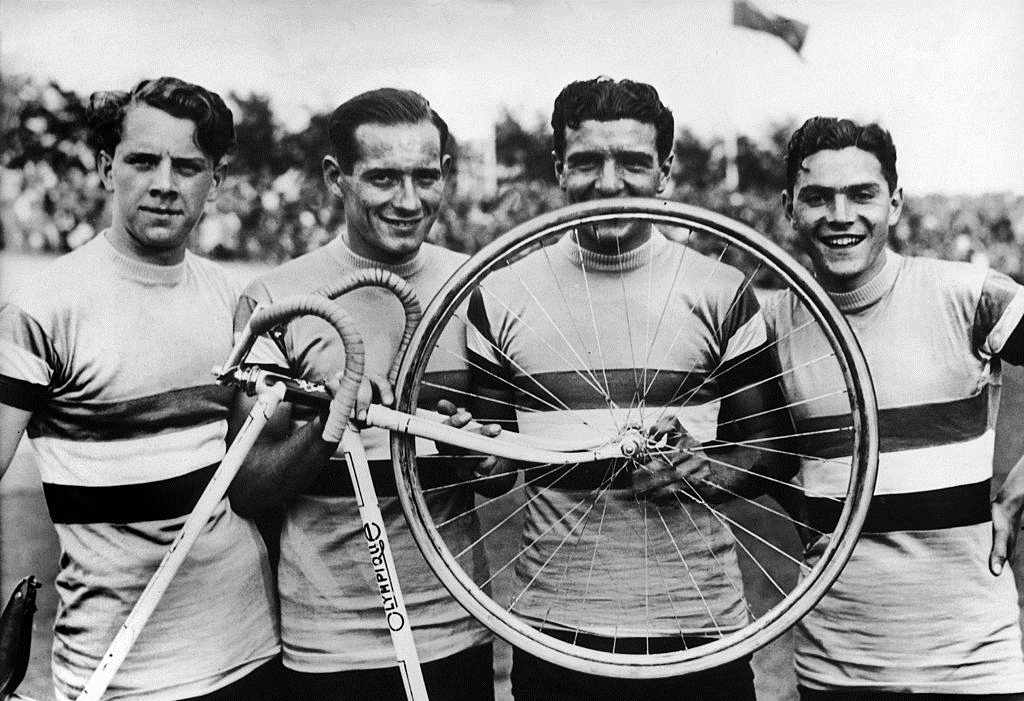
- Lapébie (2nd left) at the 1936 Olympics

Personal information
- Full name: Guy Lapébie
- Born: 28 November 1916 Saint-Geours-de-Maremne, France
- Died: 8 March 2010 (aged 93) Bagnères-de-Luchon, France

Cycling career
- Sport: Cycling
- Discipline: Road
- Role: Rider
Medal record
Men's road bicycle racing
Representing France
Olympic Games
Gold medal – first place	1936 Berlin	Team road race
Gold medal – first place	1936 Berlin	4000 m team pursuit
Silver medal – second place	1936 Berlin	Individual road race

Guy Lapébie (28 November 1916 – 8 March 2010) was a French cyclist, who won two gold and one silver medals at the 1936 Summer Olympics. After World War II he became a professional road racer.

Lapébie's elder brother was Tour de France winner Roger Lapébie. Guy's son Serge (1948–1991) was also a professional cyclist.

== Major results ==
1936
(gold) Olympic Champion 4000m team pursuit
(gold) Olympic Champion Team road race
(silver) second place Olympic individual road race
1945
Zürich-Lausanne
1946
GP du Locle
Tour des 3 Lacs
1948
Six days of Paris (with Arthus Sérès)
1948
Six days of Paris (with Achiel Bruneel)
Tour de France:

Winner stage 3
3rd place overall classification

1949
Tour de France:

Winner stage 8

1950
Six days of Saint-Etienne (with Achiel Bruneel)
1951
Six days of Hannover (with Emile Carrara)
Six days of Berlin (with Emile Carrara)
1952
Six days of Berlin (with Emile Carrara)
