= Raymond Goussot =

French cyclist

Personal information
- Born: 31 March 1922 Clamart, France
- Died: 16 July 2015 (aged 93)

Cycling career
- Sport: Cycling
- Role: Rider

Raymond Goussot (31 March 1922 – 16 July 2015) was a French racing cyclist. He rode in the 1948 Tour de France. He also finished in fourth place in the 1944 Paris–Roubaix.
