= List of teams and cyclists in the 1949 Tour de France =

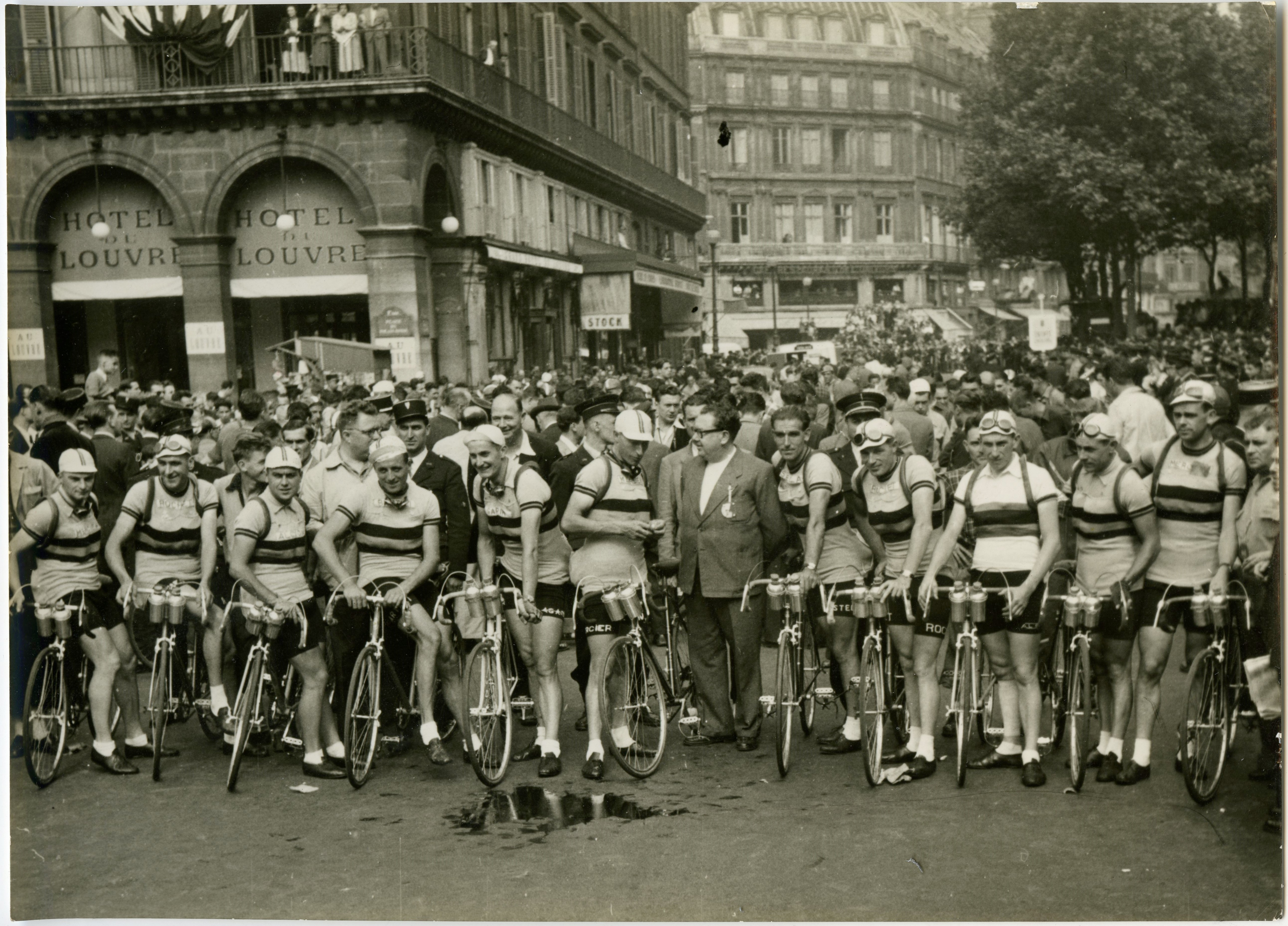
Belgian team in Paris, 1949 (collection KOERS. Museum of Cycle Racing)

As was the custom since 1930, the 1949 Tour de France was contested by national and regional teams. The three major cycling countries in 1949, Italy, Belgium and France, each sent a team of 12 cyclists. Other countries sent teams of 6 cyclists: Switzerland, Luxembourg, Netherlands and Spain. Italy and Belgium also sent two extra teams of young riders of 6 cyclists each. The French regional cyclists were divided into four teams of 12 cyclists: Ile de France, West-North, Centre-South West and South East. Altogether this made 120 cyclists.

There were 57 French cyclists, 22 Italian, 18 Belgian, 6 Dutch, 6 Luxembourg, 6 Spanish, 6 Swiss and 1 Polish cyclist. In the previous year, Fausto Coppi refused to enter the Tour de France because of personal problems with his teammate Gino Bartali. Bartali had won the previous Tour, and was trying to equal Philippe Thys by winning the Tour three times. Coppi had won the 1949 Giro d'Italia, and wanted to be the first one to achieve the Tour-Giro double in one year. The Italian team manager Alfredo Binda convinced them two weeks before the start of the race to join forces, so both Italians were in the race.

== Start list ==
=== By team ===
Italy
No.	Rider	Pos.
1	Gino Bartali (ITA)	2
2	Serafino Biagioni (ITA)	17
3	Angelo Brignole (ITA)	53
4	Fausto Coppi (ITA)	1
5	Giovanni Corrieri (ITA)	52
6	Guido De Santi (ITA)	55
7	Ettore Milano (ITA)	51
8	Bruno Pasquini (ITA)	24
9	Luciano Pezzi (ITA)	50
10	Vincenzo Rossello (ITA)	36
11	Mario Ricci (ITA)	41
12	Gino Sciardis (ITA)	12

Belgium
No.	Rider	Pos.
13	Norbert Callens (BEL)	DNF
14	Roger Ghyselinck (BEL)	DNF
15	Raymond Impanis (BEL)	DNF
16	Léon Jomaux (BEL)	DNF
17	Désiré Keteleer (BEL)	34
18	Marcel Kint (BEL)	DNF
19	Roger Lambrecht (BEL)	11
20	Florent Mathieu (BEL)	37
21	Stan Ockers (BEL)	7
22	Briek Schotte (BEL)	33
23	Edward Van Dijck (BEL)	DNF
24	Rik Van Steenbergen (BEL)	29

France
No.	Rider	Pos.
25	Louison Bobet (FRA)	DNF
26	Robert Chapatte (FRA)	16
27	Camille Danguillaume (FRA)	DNF
28	Louis Déprez (FRA)	30
29	Maurice Diot (FRA)	DNF
30	Bernard Gauthier (FRA)	DNF
31	Raphaël Géminiani (FRA)	25
32	Guy Lapébie (FRA)	DNF
33	Apo Lazaridès (FRA)	9
34	Lucien Lazaridès (FRA)	32
35	Lucien Teisseire (FRA)	14
36	René Vietto (FRA)	28

Switzerland
No.	Rider	Pos.
37	Georges Aeschlimann (SUI)	19
38	Roger Aeschlimann (SUI)	DNF
39	Hans Hutmacher (SUI)	DNF
40	Ferdinand Kübler (SUI)	DNF
41	Ernst Stettler (SUI)	DNF
42	Gottfried Weilenmann (SUI)	40

Luxembourg
No.	Rider	Pos.
43	René Biver (LUX)	DNF
44	Bim Diederich (LUX)	15
45	Marcel Ernzer (LUX)	DNF
46	Jean Goldschmit (LUX)	8
47	Willy Kemp (LUX)	DNF
48	Jeng Kirchen (LUX)	13

Netherlands
No.	Rider	Pos.
49	Henk De Hoog (NED)	DNF
50	André De Korver (NED)	DNF
51	Wim De Ruyter (NED)	DNF
52	Jan Lambrichs (NED)	DNF
53	Frans Pauwels (NED)	DNF
54	Huub Sijen (NED)	DNF

Spain
No.	Rider	Pos.
55	Julián Berrendero (ESP)	DNF
56	Bernardo Capó (ESP)	DNF
57	Dalmacio Langarica (ESP)	DNF
58	Emilio Rodríguez (ESP)	DNF
59	Bernardo Ruiz (ESP)	DNF
60	José Serra Gil (ESP)	DNF

Italy Cadets
No.	Rider	Pos.
61	Giuseppe Ausenda (ITA)	38
62	Giuseppe Cerami (ITA)	DNF
63	Fiorenzo Magni (ITA)	6
64	Alfredo Martini (ITA)	DNF
65	Silvio Pedroni (ITA)	DNF
66	Armando Peverelli (ITA)	DNF

Belgium Aiglons
No.	Rider	Pos.
67	Jean Breuer (BEL)	DNF
68	Marcel De Mulder (BEL)	21
69	Marcel Dupont (BEL)	5
70	Jacques Geus (BEL)	27
71	Marcel Hendrickx (BEL)	43
72	Joseph Verhaert (BEL)	DNF

France - Île-de-France
No.	Rider	Pos.
73	André Brulé (FRA)	23
74	Louis Caput (FRA)	DNF
75	Robert Dorgebray (FRA)	DNF
76	Dominique Forlini (FRA)	DNF
77	Georges Guillier (FRA)	DNF
78	Émile Idée (FRA)	DNF
79	Raymond Lucas (FRA)	DNF
80	Jacques Marinelli (FRA)	3
81	Édouard Muller (FRA)	44
82	Attilio Redolfi (FRA)	DNF
83	Pierre Tacca (FRA)	20
84	Louis Thiétard (FRA)	DNF

France - West/North
No.	Rider	Pos.
85	Pierre Cogan (FRA)	10
86	Jean-Marie Goasmat (FRA)	22
87	Edward Klabiński (POL)	DNF
88	Roger-Jean Le Nizerhy (FRA)	DNF
89	Ange Le Strat (FRA)	DNF
90	Lucien Maelfait (FRA)	DNF
91	André Mahé (FRA)	49
92	César Marcelak (FRA)	DNF
93	François Person (FRA)	DNF
94	Roger Pontet (FRA)	DNF
95	Jean Robic (FRA)	4
96	Eloi Tassin (FRA)	DNF

France - Centre/South-West
No.	Rider	Pos.
97	Jean Blanc (FRA)	48
98	Roger Buchonnet (FRA)	DNF
99	Robert Desbats (FRA)	DNF
100	Albert Dolhats (FRA)	42
101	Custodio Dos Reis (FRA)	54
102	Marcel Dussault (FRA)	DNF
103	Bruno Garonzi (ITA)	DNF
104	Antoine Gomez (FRA)	DNF
105	Roger Lévêque (FRA)	31
106	Henri Massal (FRA)	DNF
107	Paul Pineau (FRA)	39
108	Georges Ramoulux (FRA)	46

France - South-East
No.	Rider	Pos.
109	Pierre Brambilla (ITA)	26
110	Fermo Camellini (FRA)	DNF
111	Adolphe Deledda (FRA)	DNF
112	Édouard Fachleitner (FRA)	DNF
113	Paul Giguet (FRA)	47
114	Nello Lauredi (FRA)	18
115	Georges Martin (FRA)	35
116	Pierre Molinéris (FRA)	DNF
117	Paul Néri (ITA)	DNF
118	Jean Rey (FRA)	DNF
119	Raoul Rémy (FRA)	DNF
120	Antonin Rolland (FRA)	45

=== By rider ===
Legend
No.	Starting number worn by the rider during the Tour
Pos.	Position in the general classification
DNF	Denotes a rider who did not finish

No.	Name	Nationality	Team	Pos.	Ref
1	Gino Bartali	Italy	Italy	2	
2	Serafino Biagioni	Italy	Italy	17	
3	Angelo Brignole	Italy	Italy	53	
4	Fausto Coppi	Italy	Italy	1	
5	Giovanni Corrieri	Italy	Italy	52	
6	Guido De Santi	Italy	Italy	55	
7	Ettore Milano	Italy	Italy	51	
8	Bruno Pasquini	Italy	Italy	24	
9	Luciano Pezzi	Italy	Italy	50	
10	Vincenzo Rossello	Italy	Italy	36	
11	Mario Ricci	Italy	Italy	41	
12	Gino Sciardis	Italy	Italy	12	
13	Norbert Callens	Belgium	Belgium	DNF	
14	Roger Ghyselinck	Belgium	Belgium	DNF	
15	Raymond Impanis	Belgium	Belgium	DNF	
16	Léon Jomaux	Belgium	Belgium	DNF	
17	Désiré Keteleer	Belgium	Belgium	34	
18	Marcel Kint	Belgium	Belgium	DNF	
19	Roger Lambrecht	Belgium	Belgium	11	
20	Florent Mathieu	Belgium	Belgium	37	
21	Stan Ockers	Belgium	Belgium	7	
22	Briek Schotte	Belgium	Belgium	33	
23	Edward Van Dijck	Belgium	Belgium	DNF	
24	Rik Van Steenbergen	Belgium	Belgium	29	
25	Louison Bobet	France	France	DNF	
26	Robert Chapatte	France	France	16	
27	Camille Danguillaume	France	France	DNF	
28	Louis Déprez	France	France	30	
29	Maurice Diot	France	France	DNF	
30	Bernard Gauthier	France	France	DNF	
31	Raphaël Géminiani	France	France	25	
32	Guy Lapébie	France	France	DNF	
33	Apo Lazaridès	France	France	9	
34	Lucien Lazaridès	France	France	32	
35	Lucien Teisseire	France	France	14	
36	René Vietto	France	France	28	
37	Georges Aeschlimann	Switzerland	Switzerland	19	
38	Roger Aeschlimann	Switzerland	Switzerland	DNF	
39	Hans Hutmacher	Switzerland	Switzerland	DNF	
40	Ferdinand Kübler	Switzerland	Switzerland	DNF	
41	Ernst Stettler	Switzerland	Switzerland	DNF	
42	Gottfried Weilenmann	Switzerland	Switzerland	40	
43	René Biver	Luxembourg	Luxembourg	DNF	
44	Bim Diederich	Luxembourg	Luxembourg	15	
45	Marcel Ernzer	Luxembourg	Luxembourg	DNF	
46	Jean Goldschmit	Luxembourg	Luxembourg	8	
47	Willy Kemp	Luxembourg	Luxembourg	DNF	
48	Jeng Kirchen	Luxembourg	Luxembourg	13	
49	Henk De Hoog	Netherlands	Netherlands	DNF	
50	André De Korver	Netherlands	Netherlands	DNF	
51	Wim De Ruyter	Netherlands	Netherlands	DNF	
52	Jan Lambrichs	Netherlands	Netherlands	DNF	
53	Frans Pauwels	Netherlands	Netherlands	DNF	
54	Hubert Sijen	Netherlands	Netherlands	DNF	
55	Julián Berrendero	Spain	Spain	DNF	
56	Bernardo Capó	Spain	Spain	DNF	
57	Dalmacio Langarica	Spain	Spain	DNF	
58	Emilio Rodríguez	Spain	Spain	DNF	
59	Bernardo Ruiz	Spain	Spain	DNF	
60	José Serra Gil	Spain	Spain	DNF	
61	Giuseppe Ausenda	Italy	Italy Cadets	38	
62	Giuseppe Cerami	Italy	Italy Cadets	DNF	
63	Fiorenzo Magni	Italy	Italy Cadets	6	
64	Alfredo Martini	Italy	Italy Cadets	DNF	
65	Silvio Pedroni	Italy	Italy Cadets	DNF	
66	Armando Peverelli	Italy	Italy Cadets	DNF	
67	Jean Breuer	Belgium	Belgium Aiglons	DNF	
68	Marcel De Mulder	Belgium	Belgium Aiglons	21	
69	Marcel Dupont	Belgium	Belgium Aiglons	5	
70	Jacques Geus	Belgium	Belgium Aiglons	27	
71	Marcel Hendrickx	Belgium	Belgium Aiglons	43	
72	Joseph Verhaert	Belgium	Belgium Aiglons	DNF	
73	André Brule	France	France - Île-de-France	23	
74	Louis Caput	France	France - Île-de-France	DNF	
75	Robert Dorgebray	France	France - Île-de-France	DNF	
76	Dominique Forlini	France	France - Île-de-France	DNF	
77	Georges Guillier	France	France - Île-de-France	DNF	
78	Émile Idée	France	France - Île-de-France	DNF	
79	Raymond Lucas	France	France - Île-de-France	DNF	
80	Jacques Marinelli	France	France - Île-de-France	3	
81	Édouard Muller	France	France - Île-de-France	44	
82	Attilio Redolfi	France	France - Île-de-France	DNF	
83	Pierre Tacca	France	France - Île-de-France	20	
84	Louis Thiétard	France	France - Île-de-France	DNF	
85	Pierre Cogan	France	France - West/North	10	
86	Jean-Marie Goasmat	France	France - West/North	22	
87	Edward Klabiński	Poland	France - West/North	DNF	
88	Roger-Jean Le Nizerhy	France	France - West/North	DNF	
89	Ange Le Strat	France	France - West/North	DNF	
90	Lucien Maelfait	France	France - West/North	DNF	
91	André Mahé	France	France - West/North	49	
92	César Marcelak	France	France - West/North	DNF	
93	François Person	France	France - West/North	DNF	
94	Roger Pontet	France	France - West/North	DNF	
95	Jean Robic	France	France - West/North	4	
96	Eloi Tassin	France	France - West/North	DNF	
97	Jean Blanc	France	France - Centre/South-West	48	
98	Roger Buchonnet	France	France - Centre/South-West	DNF	
99	Robert Desbats	France	France - Centre/South-West	DNF	
100	Albert Dolhats	France	France - Centre/South-West	42	
101	Custodio Dos Reis	France	France - Centre/South-West	54	
102	Marcel Dussault	France	France - Centre/South-West	DNF	
103	Bruno Garonzi	Italy	France - Centre/South-West	DNF	
104	Antoine Gomez	France	France - Centre/South-West	DNF	
105	Roger Lévêque	France	France - Centre/South-West	31	
106	Henri Massal	France	France - Centre/South-West	DNF	
107	Paul Pineau	France	France - Centre/South-West	39	
108	Georges Ramoulux	France	France - Centre/South-West	46	
109	Pierre Brambilla	Italy	France - South-East	26	
110	Fermo Camellini	France	France - South-East	DNF	
111	Adolphe Deledda	France	France - South-East	DNF	
112	Édouard Fachleitner	France	France - South-East	DNF	
113	Paul Giguet	France	France - South-East	47	
114	Nello Lauredi	France	France - South-East	18	
115	Georges Martin	France	France - South-East	35	
116	Pierre Molinéris	France	France - South-East	DNF	
117	Paul Néri	Italy	France - South-East	DNF	
118	Jean Rey	France	France - South-East	DNF	
119	Raoul Rémy	France	France - South-East	DNF	
120	Antonin Rolland	France	France - South-East	45	
