= 1948 Tour de France, Stage 1 to Stage 11 =

Cycling race stages

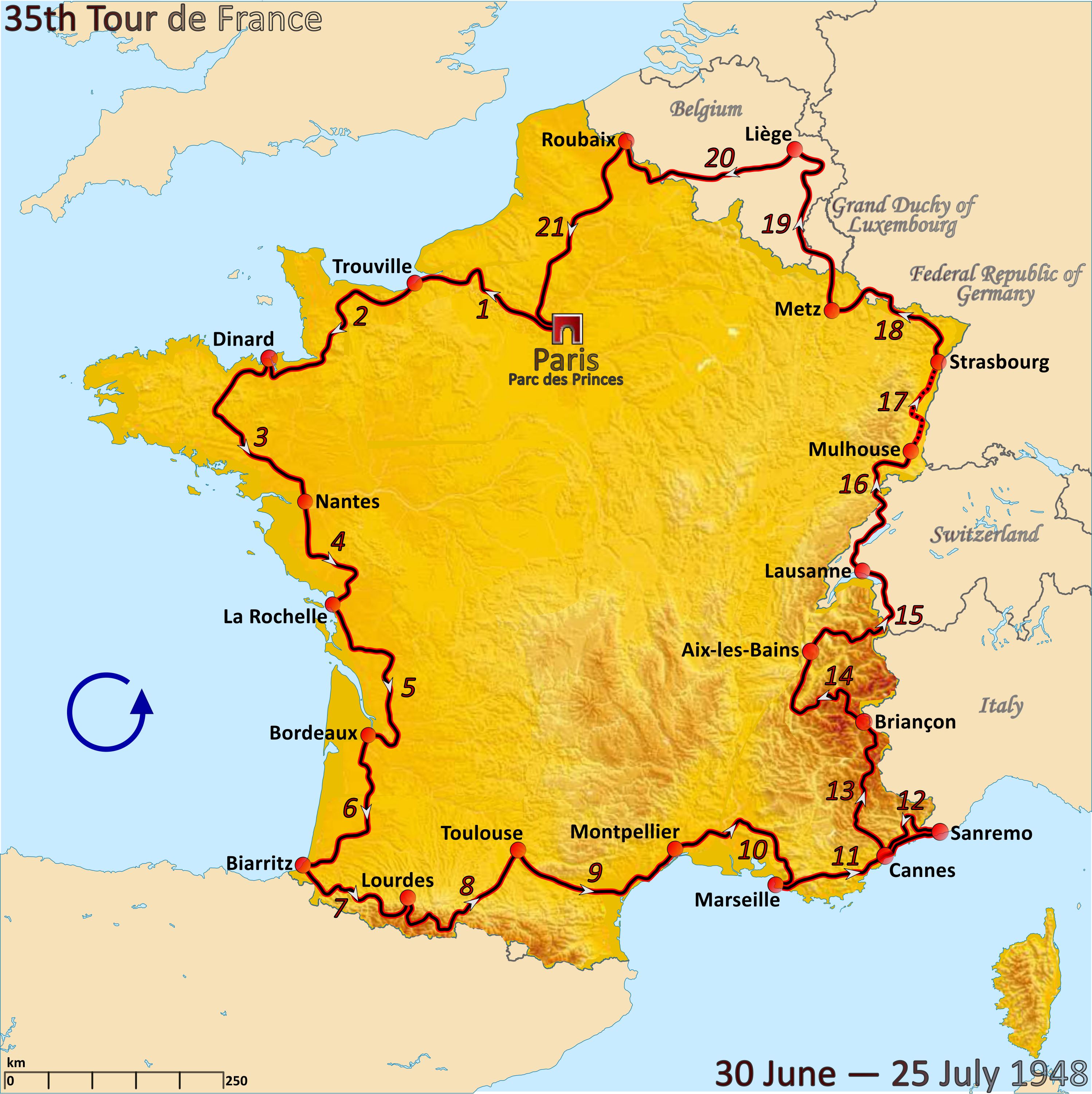
Route of the 1948 Tour de France

The 1948 Tour de France was the 35th edition of Tour de France, one of cycling's Grand Tours. The Tour began in Paris with a flat stage on 30 June and Stage 11 occurred on 12 July with a flat stage to Sanremo in Italy. The race finished in Paris on 25 July.

== Stage 1 ==
30 June 1948 - Paris to Trouville, 237 km (147.3 mi)

Stage 1 result

	Rider	Team	Time
1	Gino Bartali (ITA)	Italy	6h 50' 24"
2	Briek Schotte (BEL)	Belgium	s.t.
3	Lucien Teisseire (FRA)	France	s.t.
4	Jan Engels (BEL)	Belgium Aiglons	s.t.
5	Maurice De Muer (FRA)	France - Île de France/North-East	s.t.
6	René Mertens (BEL)	Belgium	s.t.
7	César Marcelak (FRA)	France - Île de France/North-East	s.t.
8	Florent Mathieu (BEL)	Belgium	s.t.
9	Bernard Gauthier (FRA)	France - South-East	s.t.
10	Rik Renders (BEL)	Belgium Aiglons	s.t.

General classification after stage 1

	Rider	Team	Time
1	Gino Bartali (ITA)	Italy	6h 49' 24"
2	Briek Schotte (BEL)	Belgium	+ 30"
3	Lucien Teisseire (FRA)	France	+ 1' 00"
4	Jan Engels (BEL)	Belgium Aiglons	s.t.
5	Maurice De Muer (FRA)	France - Île de France/North-East	s.t.
6	René Mertens (BEL)	Belgium	s.t.
7	César Marcelak (FRA)	France - Île de France/North-East	s.t.
8	Florent Mathieu (BEL)	Belgium	s.t.
9	Bernard Gauthier (FRA)	France - South-East	s.t.
10	Rik Renders (BEL)	Belgium Aiglons	s.t.

== Stage 2 ==
1 July 1948 - Trouville to Dinard, 259 km (160.9 mi)

Stage 2 result

	Rider	Team	Time
1	Vincenzo Rossello (ITA)	Italy	7h 29' 55"
2	Louison Bobet (FRA)	France	s.t.
3	Jan Engels (BEL)	Belgium Aiglons	s.t.
4	Lucien Teisseire (FRA)	France	+ 56"
5	Lucien Mathys (BEL)	Belgium Aiglons	s.t.
6	Robert Desbats (FRA)	France - Centre/South-West	s.t.
7	André Brulé (FRA)	France - Paris	s.t.
8	Jacques Pras (FRA)	France - Centre/South-West	s.t.
9	Gino Sciardis (ITA)	International	s.t.
10	Albert Ramon (BEL)	Belgium	s.t.

General classification after stage 2

	Rider	Team	Time
1	Jan Engels (BEL)	Belgium Aiglons	14h 20' 19"
2	Louison Bobet (FRA)	France	+ 13"
3	Briek Schotte (BEL)	Belgium	+ 26"
4	Lucien Teisseire (FRA)	France	+ 56"
5	Bernard Gauthier (FRA)	France - South-East	+ 1' 33"
6	Raphaël Géminiani (FRA)	France - Centre/South-West	+ 1' 39"
7	Roger Lambrecht (BEL)	International	s.t.
8	Fermo Camellini (ITA)	International	s.t.
9	Maurice Meersman (BEL)	Belgium Aiglons	s.t.
10	Albert Ramon (BEL)	Belgium	s.t.

== Stage 3 ==
2 July 1948 - Dinard to Nantes, 251 km (156 mi)

Stage 3 result

	Rider	Team	Time
1	Guy Lapébie (FRA)	France - Centre/South-West	6h 48' 31"
2	Raymond Impanis (BEL)	Belgium	s.t.
3	Florent Mathieu (BEL)	Belgium	s.t.
4	Georges Ramoulux (FRA)	France - Centre/South-West	s.t.
5	Maurice Diot (FRA)	France - Paris	s.t.
6	Paul Giguet (FRA)	France	s.t.
7	Louison Bobet (FRA)	France	s.t.
8	Roger Lambrecht (BEL)	International	s.t.
9	Norbert Callens (BEL)	Belgium	s.t.
10	Louis Thiétard (FRA)	France - Paris	s.t.

General classification after stage 3

	Rider	Team	Time
1	Louison Bobet (FRA)	France	21h 09' 03"
2	Roger Lambrecht (BEL)	International	+ 1' 26"
3	Florent Mathieu (BEL)	Belgium	+ 4' 15"
4	Louis Thiétard (FRA)	France - Paris	+ 5' 18"
5	Guy Lapébie (FRA)	France - Centre/South-West	+ 7' 13"
6	Raymond Impanis (BEL)	Belgium	+ 7' 43"
7	Paul Giguet (FRA)	France	+ 8' 13"
8	Aldo Ronconi (ITA)	Italy Cadets	s.t.
9	Georges Ramoulux (FRA)	France - Centre/South-West	s.t.
10	Jan Engels (BEL)	Belgium Aiglons	+ 13' 48"

== Stage 4 ==
3 July 1948 - Nantes to La Rochelle, 166 km (103 mi)

Stage 4 result

	Rider	Team	Time
1	Jacques Pras (FRA)	France - Centre/South-West	4h 01' 42"
2	Gino Sciardis (ITA)	International	s.t.
3	Amédée Rolland (FRA)	France - South-East	s.t.
4	Robert Bonnaventure (FRA)	France - West	s.t.
5	Roger Lambrecht (BEL)	International	s.t.
6	Georges Ramoulux (FRA)	France - Centre/South-West	+ 4' 19"
7	François Hélary (FRA)	France - Île de France/North-East	s.t.
8	Raymond Goussot (FRA)	France - Paris	s.t.
9	Stan Ockers (BEL)	Belgium	s.t.
10	Edward Klabiński (POL)	International	s.t.

General classification after stage 4

	Rider	Team	Time
1	Roger Lambrecht (BEL)	International	25h 12' 11"
2	Louison Bobet (FRA)	France	+ 3' 24"
3	Florent Mathieu (BEL)	Belgium	+ 7' 39"
4	Louis Thiétard (FRA)	France - Paris	+ 8' 42"
5	Guy Lapébie (FRA)	France - Centre/South-West	+ 10' 37"
6	Georges Ramoulux (FRA)	France - Centre/South-West	+ 11' 06"
7	Raymond Impanis (BEL)	Belgium	+ 11' 07"
8	Paul Giguet (FRA)	France	+ 11' 37"
9	Aldo Ronconi (ITA)	Italy Cadets	s.t.
10	Gino Sciardis (ITA)	International	+ 13' 31"

== Stage 5 ==
4 July 1948 - La Rochelle to Bordeaux, 262 km (163 mi)

Stage 5 result

	Rider	Team	Time
1	Raoul Rémy (FRA)	France - South-East	7h 03' 32"
2	Roger Chupin (FRA)	France - West	s.t.
3	Giuseppe Tacca (ITA)	International	s.t.
4	Maurice Diot (FRA)	France - Paris	s.t.
5	Briek Schotte (BEL)	Belgium	s.t.
6	Giovanni Corrieri (ITA)	Italy	s.t.
7	Lucien Teisseire (FRA)	France	s.t.
8	Albert Ramon (BEL)	Belgium	s.t.
9	Wim de Ruyter (NED)	Netherlands/Luxembourg	s.t.
10	Willy Kemp (LUX)	Netherlands/Luxembourg	s.t.

General classification after stage 5

	Rider	Team	Time
1	Roger Lambrecht (BEL)	International	32h 26' 28"
2	Gino Sciardis (ITA)	International	+ 2' 46"
3	Louison Bobet (FRA)	France	+ 3' 24"
4	Jan Engels (BEL)	Belgium Aiglons	+ 6' 27"
5	Briek Schotte (BEL)	Belgium	+ 6' 53"
6	Lucien Teisseire (FRA)	France	+ 7' 23"
7	Florent Mathieu (BEL)	Belgium	+ 7' 39"
8	Albert Ramon (BEL)	Belgium	+ 8' 06"
9	Louis Thiétard (FRA)	France - Paris	+ 8' 42"
10	Guy Lapébie (FRA)	France - Centre/South-West	+ 10' 37"

== Stage 6 ==
5 July 1948 - Bordeaux to Biarritz, 244 km (152 mi)

Stage 6 result

	Rider	Team	Time
1	Louison Bobet (FRA)	France	6h 27' 14"
2	Édouard Muller (FRA)	France - Île de France/North-East	s.t.
3	Yvan Marie (FRA)	France - West	s.t.
4	Victor Joly (BEL)	International	s.t.
5	Lucien Teisseire (FRA)	France	+ 2' 05"
6	Albert Ramon (BEL)	Belgium	s.t.
7	Stan Ockers (BEL)	Belgium	s.t.
8	Edward Klabiński (POL)	International	+ 2' 09"
9	Edward Van Dijck (BEL)	Belgium	s.t.
10	Lucien Mathys (BEL)	Belgium Aiglons	s.t.

General classification after stage 6

	Rider	Team	Time
1	Louison Bobet (FRA)	France	38h 56' 06"
2	Roger Lambrecht (BEL)	International	+ 11"
3	Gino Sciardis (ITA)	International	+ 2' 57"
4	Jan Engels (BEL)	Belgium Aiglons	+ 6' 38"
5	Briek Schotte (BEL)	Belgium	+ 7' 04"
6	Lucien Teisseire (FRA)	France	s.t.
7	Albert Ramon (BEL)	Belgium	+ 7' 47"
8	Florent Mathieu (BEL)	Belgium	+ 7' 50"
9	Louis Thiétard (FRA)	France - Paris	+ 8' 53"
10	Guy Lapébie (FRA)	France - Centre/South-West	+ 10' 48"

== Rest Day 1 ==
6 July 1948 - Biarritz

== Stage 7 ==
7 July 1948 - Biarritz to Lourdes, 219 km (136 mi)

Stage 7 result

	Rider	Team	Time
1	Gino Bartali (ITA)	Italy	6h 40' 47"
2	Jean Robic (FRA)	France	s.t.
3	Louison Bobet (FRA)	France	+ 3"
4	Bernard Gauthier (FRA)	France - South-East	+ 48"
5	Raphaël Géminiani (FRA)	France - Centre/South-West	+ 2' 14"
6	Lucien Teisseire (FRA)	France	+ 2' 22"
7	Giordano Cottur (ITA)	Italy	s.t.
8	Stan Ockers (BEL)	Belgium	s.t.
9	Pierre Baratin (FRA)	France - Île de France/North-East	s.t.
10	Aldo Ronconi (ITA)	Italy Cadets	s.t.

General classification after stage 7

	Rider	Team	Time
1	Louison Bobet (FRA)	France	45h 36' 56"
2	Gino Sciardis (ITA)	International	+ 6' 44"
3	Roger Lambrecht (BEL)	International	+ 9' 18"
4	Lucien Teisseire (FRA)	France	+ 9' 23"
5	Aldo Ronconi (ITA)	Italy Cadets	+ 14' 07"
6	Jan Engels (BEL)	Belgium Aiglons	+ 14' 21"
7	Guy Lapébie (FRA)	France - Centre/South-West	+ 16' 34"
8	Louis Thiétard (FRA)	France - Paris	+ 16' 36"
9	Briek Schotte (BEL)	Belgium	+ 17' 40"
10	Raoul Rémy (FRA)	France - South-East	+ 18' 32"

== Stage 8 ==
8 July 1948 - Lourdes to Toulouse, 261 km (162 mi)

Stage 8 result

	Rider	Team	Time
1	Gino Bartali (ITA)	Italy	8h 27' 25"
2	Guy Lapébie (FRA)	France - Centre/South-West	s.t.
3	Stan Ockers (BEL)	Belgium	s.t.
4	Giuseppe Tacca (ITA)	International	s.t.
5	Louis Thiétard (FRA)	France - Paris	s.t.
6	Giordano Cottur (ITA)	Italy	s.t.
7	Paul Néri (ITA)	International	s.t.
8	Jean Robic (FRA)	France	s.t.
9	André Brulé (FRA)	France - Paris	s.t.
10	Lucien Teisseire (FRA)	France	s.t.

General classification after stage 8

	Rider	Team	Time
1	Louison Bobet (FRA)	France	54h 04' 21"
2	Roger Lambrecht (BEL)	International	+ 9' 18"
3	Lucien Teisseire (FRA)	France	+ 9' 23"
4	Gino Sciardis (ITA)	International	+ 9' 59"
5	Guy Lapébie (FRA)	France - Centre/South-West	+ 16' 04"
6	Louis Thiétard (FRA)	France - Paris	+ 16' 36"
7	Aldo Ronconi (ITA)	Italy Cadets	+ 17' 22"
8	Gino Bartali (ITA)	Italy	+ 18' 18"
9	Stan Ockers (BEL)	Belgium	+ 20' 12"
10	Pierre Brambilla (ITA)	International	+ 20' 13"

== Rest Day 2 ==
9 July 1948 - Toulouse

== Stage 9 ==
10 July 1948 - Toulouse to Montpellier, 246 km (153 mi)

Stage 9 result

	Rider	Team	Time
1	Raymond Impanis (BEL)	Belgium	6h 03' 01"
2	Léon Jomaux (BEL)	Belgium Aiglons	+ 4' 36"
3	Wim de Ruyter (NED)	Netherlands/Luxembourg	+ 4' 38"
4	Paul Maye (FRA)	France - Centre/South-West	+ 5' 25"
5	Florent Mathieu (BEL)	Belgium	s.t.
6	Serafino Biagioni (ITA)	Italy	+ 5' 28"
7	Raphaël Géminiani (FRA)	France - Centre/South-West	+ 5' 31"
8	Marcel Dupont (BEL)	Belgium Aiglons	s.t.
9	Maurice De Muer (FRA)	France - Île de France/North-East	s.t.
10	Vittorio Seghezzi (ITA)	Italy Cadets	+ 5' 37"

General classification after stage 9

	Rider	Team	Time
1	Louison Bobet (FRA)	France	60h 13' 04"
2	Roger Lambrecht (BEL)	International	+ 9' 18"
3	Lucien Teisseire (FRA)	France	+ 9' 23"
4	Gino Sciardis (ITA)	International	+ 9' 59"
5	Guy Lapébie (FRA)	France - Centre/South-West	+ 16' 04"
6	Louis Thiétard (FRA)	France - Paris	+ 16' 36"
7	Aldo Ronconi (ITA)	Italy Cadets	+ 17' 22"
8	Gino Bartali (ITA)	Italy	+ 18' 18"
9	Pierre Brambilla (ITA)	International	+ 20' 13"
10	Briek Schotte (BEL)	Belgium	+ 20' 55"

== Stage 10 ==
11 July 1948 - Montpellier to Marseille, 248 km (154 mi)

Stage 10 result

	Rider	Team	Time
1	Raymond Impanis (BEL)	Belgium	6h 55' 40"
2	Fermo Camellini (ITA)	International	s.t.
3	Paul Néri (ITA)	International	s.t.
4	Stan Ockers (BEL)	Belgium	s.t.
5	André Brulé (FRA)	France - Paris	s.t.
6	Roger Lambrecht (BEL)	International	s.t.
7	Marcel Dupont (BEL)	Belgium Aiglons	s.t.
8	Pierre Brambilla (ITA)	International	s.t.
9	Guy Lapébie (FRA)	France - Centre/South-West	+ 1' 10"
10	Edward Van Dijck (BEL)	Belgium	s.t.

General classification after stage 10

	Rider	Team	Time
1	Louison Bobet (FRA)	France	67h 17' 33"
2	Roger Lambrecht (BEL)	International	+ 29"
3	Guy Lapébie (FRA)	France - Centre/South-West	+ 8' 25"
4	Lucien Teisseire (FRA)	France	+ 9' 23"
5	Gino Sciardis (ITA)	International	+ 9' 59"
6	Aldo Ronconi (ITA)	Italy Cadets	+ 10' 53"
7	Raymond Impanis (BEL)	Belgium	+ 11' 09"
8	Pierre Brambilla (ITA)	International	+ 11' 24"
9	Gino Bartali (ITA)	Italy	+ 11' 49"
10	Fermo Camellini (ITA)	International	+ 12' 02"

== Stage 11 ==
12 July 1948 - Marseille to Sanremo, 245 km (152 mi)

Stage 11 result

	Rider	Team	Time
1	Gino Sciardis (ITA)	International	7h 23' 53"
2	Urbain Caffi (FRA)	France - Île de France/North-East	+ 1' 12"
3	Vittorio Seghezzi (ITA)	Italy Cadets	s.t.
4	Pierre Cogan (FRA)	France - West	+ 1' 15"
5	André Rosseel (BEL)	Belgium Aiglons	+ 2' 04"
6	Raphaël Géminiani (FRA)	France - Centre/South-West	s.t.
7	Lucien Mathys (BEL)	Belgium Aiglons	s.t.
8	Gino Bartali (ITA)	Italy	+ 2' 14"
9	Antonio Bevilacqua (ITA)	Italy	s.t.
10	René Mertens (BEL)	Belgium	s.t.

General classification after stage 11

	Rider	Team	Time
1	Louison Bobet (FRA)	France	74h 43' 40"
2	Roger Lambrecht (BEL)	International	+ 29"
3	Gino Sciardis (ITA)	International	+ 6' 45"
4	Guy Lapébie (FRA)	France - Centre/South-West	+ 8' 25"
5	Lucien Teisseire (FRA)	France	+ 9' 23"
6	Aldo Ronconi (ITA)	Italy Cadets	+ 10' 53"
7	Raymond Impanis (BEL)	Belgium	+ 11' 09"
8	Pierre Brambilla (ITA)	International	+ 11' 24"
9	Gino Bartali (ITA)	Italy	+ 11' 49"
10	Fermo Camellini (ITA)	International	+ 12' 02"
