= 1948 Tour de France, Stage 12 to Stage 21 =

Cycling race stages

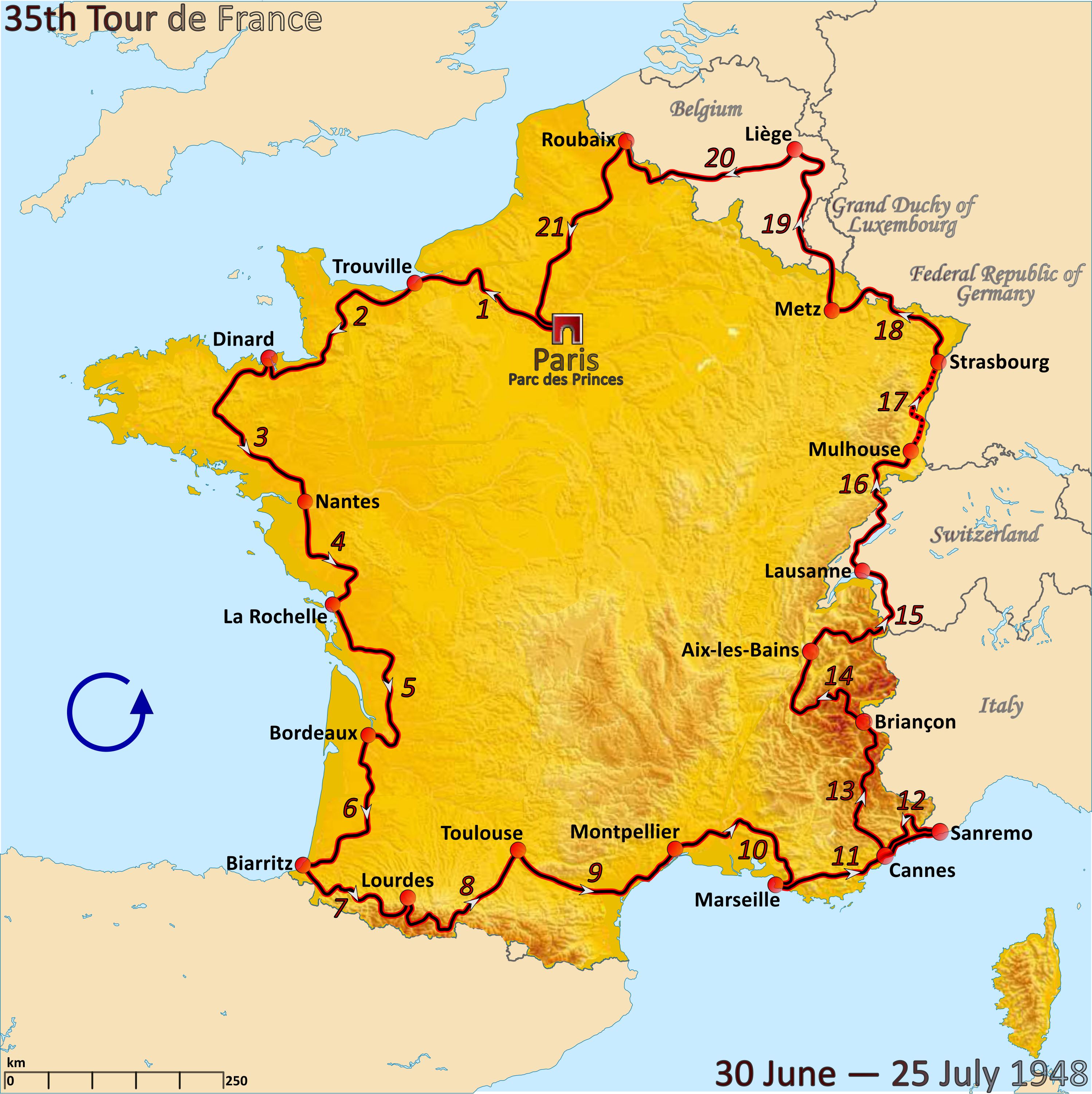
Route of the 1948 Tour de France

The 1948 Tour de France was the 35th edition of Tour de France, one of cycling's Grand Tours. The Tour began in Paris with a flat stage on 30 June and Stage 12 occurred on 13 July with a mountainous stage from Sanremo in Italy. The race finished in Paris on 25 July.

== Stage 12 ==
13 July 1948 - Sanremo to Cannes, 170 km (105.6 mi)

Stage 12 result

Rank	Rider	Team	Time
1	Louison Bobet (FRA)	France	5h 22' 56"
2	Pierre Molinéris (FRA)	France - South-East	s.t.
3	Roger Lambrecht (BEL)	International	s.t.
4	Jeng Kirchen (LUX)	Netherlands/Luxembourg	s.t.
5	Apo Lazaridès (FRA)	France	s.t.
6	Raphaël Géminiani (FRA)	France - Centre/South-West	+ 57"
7	Jean Robic (FRA)	France	s.t.
8	André Brulé (FRA)	France - Paris	s.t.
9	Raymond Impanis (BEL)	Belgium	s.t.
10	Louis Thiétard (FRA)	France - Paris	s.t.

General classification after stage 12

Rank	Rider	Team	Time
1	Louison Bobet (FRA)	France	80h 04' 36"
2	Roger Lambrecht (BEL)	International	+ 2' 29"
3	Raymond Impanis (BEL)	Belgium	+ 14' 06"
4	Lucien Teisseire (FRA)	France	+ 19' 02"
5	Louis Thiétard (FRA)	France - Paris	+ 20' 01"
6	Aldo Ronconi (ITA)	Italy Cadets	+ 20' 32"
7	Gino Bartali (ITA)	Italy	+ 21' 28"
8	Fermo Camellini (ITA)	International	+ 21' 41"
9	Guy Lapébie (FRA)	France - Centre/South-West	+ 24' 54"
10	Lucien Mathys (BEL)	Belgium Aiglons	+ 25' 34"

== Rest Day 3 ==
14 July 1948 - Cannes

== Stage 13 ==
15 July 1948 - Cannes to Briançon, 274 km (170 mi)

Stage 13 result

Rank	Rider	Team	Time
1	Gino Bartali (ITA)	Italy	10h 09' 28"
2	Briek Schotte (BEL)	Belgium	+ 6' 18"
3	Fermo Camellini (ITA)	International	+ 9' 15"
4	René Vietto (FRA)	France	+ 10' 43"
5	Lucien Teisseire (FRA)	France	+ 11' 17"
6	Jean de Gribaldy (FRA)	France - Île de France/North-East	+ 11' 22"
7	Edward Klabiński (POL)	International	+ 13' 15"
8	Guy Lapébie (FRA)	France - Centre/South-West	+ 13' 47"
9	Jeng Kirchen (LUX)	Netherlands/Luxembourg	+ 14' 54"
10	Bruno Pasquini (ITA)	Italy	+ 17' 14"

General classification after stage 13

Rank	Rider	Team	Time
1	Louison Bobet (FRA)	France	90h 32' 11"
2	Gino Bartali (ITA)	Italy	+ 1' 06"
3	Roger Lambrecht (BEL)	International	+ 2' 29"
4	Lucien Teisseire (FRA)	France	+ 12' 12"
5	Fermo Camellini (ITA)	International	+ 12' 49"
6	Raymond Impanis (BEL)	Belgium	+ 19' 57"
7	Guy Lapébie (FRA)	France - Centre/South-West	+ 20' 35"
8	Briek Schotte (BEL)	Belgium	+ 20' 36"
9	René Vietto (FRA)	France	+ 22' 56"
10	Louis Thiétard (FRA)	France - Paris	+ 27' 18"

== Stage 14 ==
16 July 1948 - Briançon to Aix-les-Bains, 263 km (163 mi)

Stage 14 result

Rank	Rider	Team	Time
1	Gino Bartali (ITA)	Italy	9h 30' 18"
2	Stan Ockers (BEL)	Belgium	+ 5' 53"
3	Guy Lapébie (FRA)	France - Centre/South-West	+ 7' 03"
4	Edward Van Dijck (BEL)	Belgium	s.t.
5	Briek Schotte (BEL)	Belgium	s.t.
6	Louison Bobet (FRA)	France	+ 7' 09"
7	Jeng Kirchen (LUX)	Netherlands/Luxembourg	s.t.
8	Apo Lazaridès (FRA)	France	+ 12' 19"
9	René Vietto (FRA)	France	s.t.
10	Kleber Piot (FRA)	France - Paris	+ 13' 07"

General classification after stage 14

Rank	Rider	Team	Time
1	Gino Bartali (ITA)	Italy	100h 01' 35"
2	Louison Bobet (FRA)	France	+ 8' 03"
3	Guy Lapébie (FRA)	France - Centre/South-West	+ 29' 02"
4	Briek Schotte (BEL)	Belgium	+ 29' 03"
5	Fermo Camellini (ITA)	International	+ 31' 11"
6	Lucien Teisseire (FRA)	France	+ 31' 37"
7	René Vietto (FRA)	France	+ 36' 39"
8	Jeng Kirchen (LUX)	Netherlands/Luxembourg	+ 38' 31"
9	Roger Lambrecht (BEL)	International	+ 41' 53"
10	Louis Thiétard (FRA)	France - Paris	+ 47' 43"

== Rest Day 4 ==
17 July 1948 - Aix-les-Bains

== Stage 15 ==
18 July 1948 - Aix-les-Bains to Lausanne, 256 km (159 mi)

Stage 15 result

Rank	Rider	Team	Time
1	Gino Bartali (ITA)	Italy	8h 29' 55"
2	Briek Schotte (BEL)	Belgium	+ 1' 47"
3	Pierre Baratin (FRA)	France - Île de France/North-East	s.t.
4	André Brulé (FRA)	France - Paris	s.t.
5	Lucien Teisseire (FRA)	France	s.t.
6	Raymond Impanis (BEL)	Belgium	s.t.
7	Jean de Gribaldy (FRA)	France - Île de France/North-East	s.t.
8	Fermo Camellini (ITA)	International	s.t.
9	Jeng Kirchen (LUX)	Netherlands/Luxembourg	s.t.
10	Primo Volpi (ITA)	Italy	s.t.

General classification after stage 15

Rank	Rider	Team	Time
1	Gino Bartali (ITA)	Italy	108h 29' 30"
2	Louison Bobet (FRA)	France	+ 13' 47"
3	Briek Schotte (BEL)	Belgium	+ 31' 50"
4	Fermo Camellini (ITA)	International	+ 34' 28"
5	Lucien Teisseire (FRA)	France	+ 34' 39"
6	Guy Lapébie (FRA)	France - Centre/South-West	+ 34' 46"
7	Jeng Kirchen (LUX)	Netherlands/Luxembourg	+ 41' 48"
8	Roger Lambrecht (BEL)	International	+ 47' 37"
9	René Vietto (FRA)	France	+ 48' 06"
10	Louis Thiétard (FRA)	France - Paris	+ 54' 17"

== Stage 16 ==
19 July 1948 - Lausanne to Mulhouse, 243 km (151 mi)

Stage 16 result

Rank	Rider	Team	Time
1	Edward Van Dijck (BEL)	Belgium	6h 44' 07"
2	Stan Ockers (BEL)	Belgium	s.t.
3	Jan Engels (BEL)	Belgium Aiglons	+ 18"
4	Pierre Baratin (FRA)	France - Île de France/North-East	+ 32"
5	Raphaël Géminiani (FRA)	France - Centre/South-West	s.t.
6	Louis Thiétard (FRA)	France - Paris	s.t.
7	Kleber Piot (FRA)	France - Paris	s.t.
8	André Brulé (FRA)	France - Paris	s.t.
9	Raymond Impanis (BEL)	Belgium	s.t.
10	Florent Mathieu (BEL)	Belgium	s.t.

General classification after stage 16

Rank	Rider	Team	Time
1	Gino Bartali (ITA)	Italy	115h 13' 39"
2	Briek Schotte (BEL)	Belgium	+ 32' 20"
3	Lucien Teisseire (FRA)	France	+ 35' 09"
4	Guy Lapébie (FRA)	France - Centre/South-West	+ 35' 16"
5	Louison Bobet (FRA)	France	+ 35' 40"
6	Jeng Kirchen (LUX)	Netherlands/Luxembourg	+ 42' 18"
7	Louis Thiétard (FRA)	France - Paris	+ 54' 47"
8	Fermo Camellini (ITA)	International	+ 56' 18"
9	Roger Lambrecht (BEL)	International	+ 58' 54"
10	André Brulé (FRA)	France - Paris	+ 1h 00' 28"

== Rest Day 5 ==
20 July 1948 - Mulhouse

== Stage 17 ==
21 July 1948 - Mulhouse to Strasbourg, 120 km (75 mi) (ITT)

Stage 17 result

Rank	Rider	Team	Time
1	Roger Lambrecht (BEL)	International	2h 55' 17"
2	Edward Klabiński (POL)	International	+ 38"
3	Guy Lapébie (FRA)	France - Centre/South-West	+ 1' 30"
4	Bruno Pasquini (ITA)	Italy	+ 3' 36"
5	Stan Ockers (BEL)	Belgium	+ 4' 19"
6	Briek Schotte (BEL)	Belgium	+ 4' 55"
7	Fermo Camellini (ITA)	International	+ 5' 09"
8	Louison Bobet (FRA)	France	+ 5' 17"
9	Jeng Kirchen (LUX)	Netherlands/Luxembourg	+ 5' 26"
10	André Brulé (FRA)	France - Paris	+ 5' 45"

General classification after stage 17

Rank	Rider	Team	Time
1	Gino Bartali (ITA)	Italy	118h 20' 55"
2	Guy Lapébie (FRA)	France - Centre/South-West	+ 24' 47"
3	Briek Schotte (BEL)	Belgium	+ 25' 16"
4	Louison Bobet (FRA)	France	+ 28' 58"
5	Jeng Kirchen (LUX)	Netherlands/Luxembourg	+ 35' 45"
6	Lucien Teisseire (FRA)	France	+ 37' 59"
7	Roger Lambrecht (BEL)	International	+ 45' 55"
8	Fermo Camellini (ITA)	International	+ 49' 28"
9	Louis Thiétard (FRA)	France - Paris	+ 51' 22"
10	André Brulé (FRA)	France - Paris	+ 54' 14"

== Stage 18 ==
22 July 1948 - Strasbourg to Metz, 195 km (121 mi)

Stage 18 result

Rank	Rider	Team	Time
1	Giovanni Corrieri (ITA)	Italy	5h 54' 37"
2	Stan Ockers (BEL)	Belgium	s.t.
3	Bernard Gauthier (FRA)	France - South-East	s.t.
4	Edward Klabiński (POL)	International	s.t.
5	Georges Martin (FRA)	France - South-East	s.t.
6	Pierre Baratin (FRA)	France - Île de France/North-East	s.t.
7	Jean Robic (FRA)	France	+ 1' 26"
8	Vittorio Seghezzi (ITA)	Italy Cadets	s.t.
9	André Brulé (FRA)	France - Paris	s.t.
10	Florent Mathieu (BEL)	Belgium	s.t.

General classification after stage 18

Rank	Rider	Team	Time
1	Gino Bartali (ITA)	Italy	124h 16' 58"
2	Guy Lapébie (FRA)	France - Centre/South-West	+ 24' 47"
3	Briek Schotte (BEL)	Belgium	+ 25' 16"
4	Louison Bobet (FRA)	France	+ 28' 58"
5	Jeng Kirchen (LUX)	Netherlands/Luxembourg	+ 35' 45"
6	Lucien Teisseire (FRA)	France	+ 37' 59"
7	Roger Lambrecht (BEL)	International	+ 45' 55"
8	Fermo Camellini (ITA)	International	+ 49' 28"
9	Louis Thiétard (FRA)	France - Paris	+ 51' 22"
10	André Brulé (FRA)	France - Paris	+ 54' 14"

== Stage 19 ==
23 July 1948 - Metz to Liège, 249 km (155 mi)

Stage 19 result

Rank	Rider	Team	Time
1	Gino Bartali (ITA)	Italy	7h 18' 55"
2	Jean Robic (FRA)	France	s.t.
3	Briek Schotte (BEL)	Belgium	s.t.
4	Stan Ockers (BEL)	Belgium	s.t.
5	Paul Néri (ITA)	International	s.t.
6	André Brulé (FRA)	France - Paris	+ 1' 08"
7	Paul Giguet (FRA)	France	s.t.
8	Fermo Camellini (ITA)	International	s.t.
9	Raymond Impanis (BEL)	Belgium	s.t.
10	Jeng Kirchen (LUX)	Netherlands/Luxembourg	s.t.

General classification after stage 19

Rank	Rider	Team	Time
1	Gino Bartali (ITA)	Italy	131h 34' 53"
2	Briek Schotte (BEL)	Belgium	+ 26' 16"
3	Guy Lapébie (FRA)	France - Centre/South-West	+ 28' 48"
4	Louison Bobet (FRA)	France	+ 32' 59"
5	Jeng Kirchen (LUX)	Netherlands/Luxembourg	+ 37' 53"
6	Lucien Teisseire (FRA)	France	+ 42' 00"
7	Roger Lambrecht (BEL)	International	+ 49' 56"
8	Fermo Camellini (ITA)	International	+ 51' 36"
9	Louis Thiétard (FRA)	France - Paris	+ 55' 23"
10	André Brulé (FRA)	France - Paris	+ 56' 22"

== Stage 20 ==
24 July 1948 - Liège to Roubaix, 228 km (142 mi)

Stage 20 result

Rank	Rider	Team	Time
1	Bernard Gauthier (FRA)	France - South-East	6h 31' 36"
2	Edward Klabiński (POL)	International	s.t.
3	Stan Ockers (BEL)	Belgium	s.t.
4	Alphonse Devreese (FRA)	France - Île de France/North-East	+ 39"
5	Jan Engels (BEL)	Belgium Aiglons	+ 1' 03"
6	Gino Bartali (ITA)	Italy	s.t.
7	Paul Giguet (FRA)	France	s.t.
8	Jean Robic (FRA)	France	s.t.
9	Guy Lapébie (FRA)	France - Centre/South-West	s.t.
10	Kleber Piot (FRA)	France - Paris	s.t.

General classification after stage 20

Rank	Rider	Team	Time
1	Gino Bartali (ITA)	Italy	138h 07' 32"
2	Briek Schotte (BEL)	Belgium	+ 26' 16"
3	Guy Lapébie (FRA)	France - Centre/South-West	+ 28' 48"
4	Louison Bobet (FRA)	France	+ 32' 59"
5	Jeng Kirchen (LUX)	Netherlands/Luxembourg	+ 37' 53"
6	Lucien Teisseire (FRA)	France	+ 42' 00"
7	Roger Lambrecht (BEL)	International	+ 49' 56"
8	Fermo Camellini (ITA)	International	+ 51' 36"
9	Louis Thiétard (FRA)	France - Paris	+ 55' 23"
10	Raymond Impanis (BEL)	Belgium	+ 1h 00' 03"

== Stage 21 ==
25 July 1948 - Roubaix to Paris, 286 km (178 mi)

Stage 21 result

Rank	Rider	Team	Time
1	Giovanni Corrieri (ITA)	Italy	9h 01' 51"
2	Lucien Teisseire (FRA)	France	s.t.
3	Vittorio Seghezzi (ITA)	Italy Cadets	+ 1' 13"
4	Raoul Rémy (FRA)	France - South-East	s.t.
5	Stan Ockers (BEL)	Belgium	s.t.
6	Paul Giguet (FRA)	France	s.t.
7	Gino Bartali (ITA)	Italy	s.t.
8	André Brulé (FRA)	France - Paris	s.t.
9	Jan Engels (BEL)	Belgium Aiglons	s.t.
10	Jeng Kirchen (LUX)	Netherlands/Luxembourg	s.t.

General classification after stage 21

Rank	Rider	Team	Time
1	Gino Bartali (ITA)	Italy	147h 10' 36"
2	Briek Schotte (BEL)	Belgium	+ 26' 16"
3	Guy Lapébie (FRA)	France - Centre/South-West	+ 28' 48"
4	Louison Bobet (FRA)	France	+ 32' 59"
5	Jeng Kirchen (LUX)	Netherlands/Luxembourg	+ 37' 53"
6	Lucien Teisseire (FRA)	France	+ 40' 17"
7	Roger Lambrecht (BEL)	International	+ 49' 56"
8	Fermo Camellini (ITA)	International	+ 51' 36"
9	Louis Thiétard (FRA)	France - Paris	+ 55' 23"
10	Raymond Impanis (BEL)	Belgium	+ 1h 00' 03"
