= 1949 Paris–Tours =

Race details
- Dates: 15 May 1949
- Stages: 1
- Distance: 251 km (156.0 mi)
- Winning time: 6h 03' 58"

Results
| | Winner | Albert Ramon (BEL) |
| | Second | Paul Néri (FRA) |
| | Third | Jacques Geus (BEL) |

The 1949 Paris–Tours was the 43rd edition of the Paris–Tours cycle race and was held on 15 May 1949. The race started in Paris and finished in Tours. The race was won by Albert Ramon.

== General classification ==
Final general classification

| Rank | Rider | Time |
|---|---|---|
| 1 | Albert Ramon (BEL) | 6h 03' 58" |
| 2 | Paul Néri (FRA) | + 0" |
| 3 | Jacques Geus (BEL) | + 0" |
| 4 | Roger Lévêque (FRA) | + 0" |
| 5 | Jean Lauk (FRA) | + 14" |
| 6 | Raymond Guégan (FRA) | + 1' 07" |
| 7 | Georges Claes (BEL) | + 1' 07" |
| 8 | Urbain Caffi (FRA) | + 1' 07" |
| 9 | Marcel Ryckaert (BEL) | + 1' 07" |
| 10 | Maurice Mollin (BEL) | + 1' 07" |
