= Souvenir Henri Desgrange =

French cycling award and prize

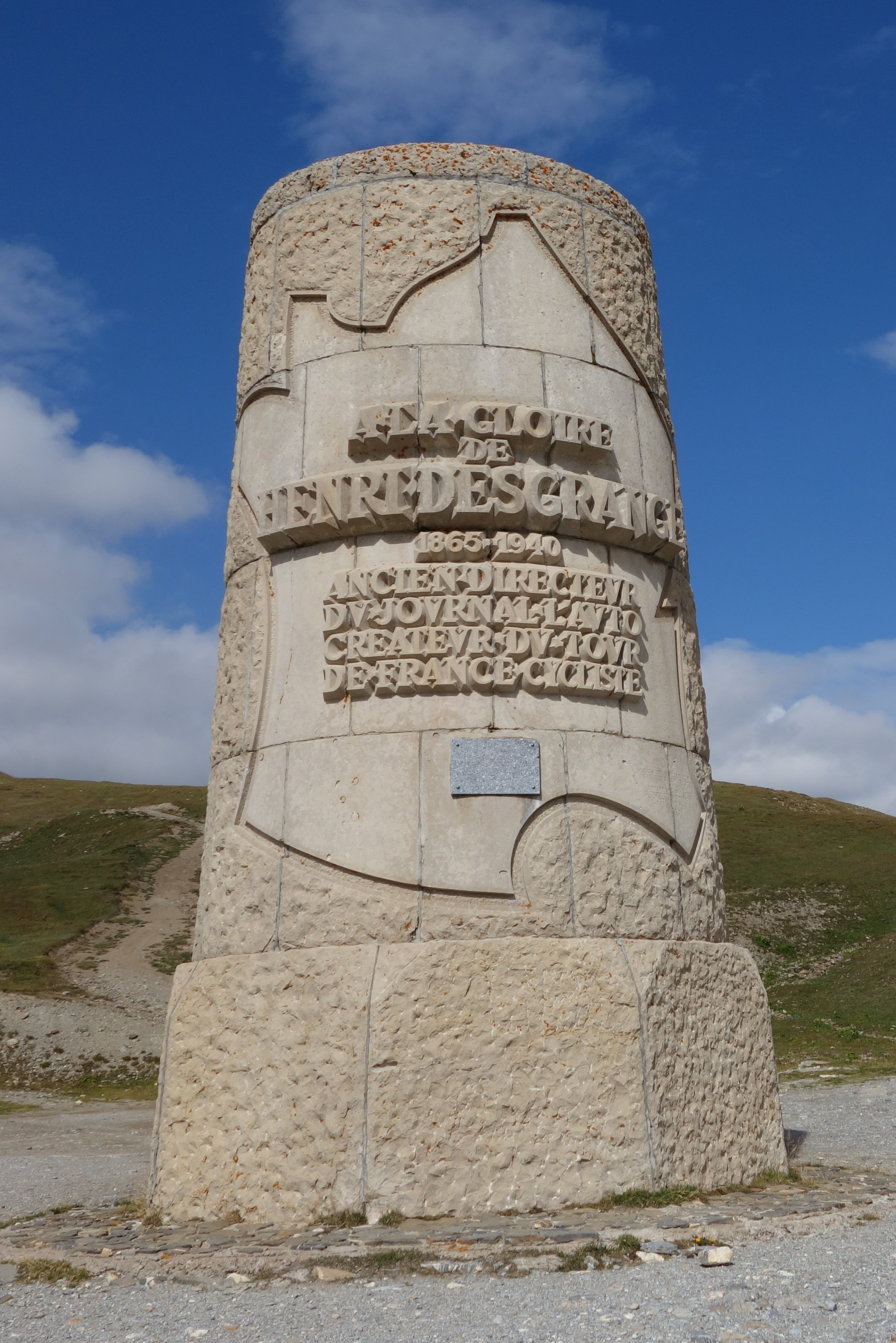
- The monument to Henri Desgrange near the summit of the Col du Galibier
- Sport: Road bicycle racing
- Competition: Tour de France
- Awarded for: First across a particular point
- Location: Various
- Country: France

History
- First award: 1947
- Editions: 79 (as of 2026)
- First winner: Raymond Impanis (BEL)
- Most wins: Richard Virenque (FRA) Nairo Quintana (COL) 3 wins
- Most recent: Richard Carapaz (ECU)

The Souvenir Henri Desgrange is an award and cash prize given in the yearly running of the Tour de France, one of cycling's Grand Tour races. It is won by the rider that crosses a particular point in the race, mostly the summits of the highest and iconic climbs in the Alps and Pyrenees. It is named in honour of the creator and first race director of the Tour, French sports journalist Henri Desgrange, who was passionate about taking the Tour de France as high up in the mountains as possible using the most difficult routes.

== History ==
Following the death of Desgrange in August 1940, an award was given in his honour for the first time in the 1947 Tour, the first Tour since 1939, having been cancelled during World War II. On stage 11, Raymond Impanis was the first of the field to pass a point by Desgrange's final residence, the "Villa Mia" in Beauvallon, Grimaud, on the French Riviera. In the first stage of the 1948 Tour, the prize was earned by Roger Lambrecht in the opening few kilometres at the summit of the Côte de Picardie climb in Versailles, Paris. Beauvallon again hosted the award the following year, before the 1950 and 1951 Tours saw the award marker point moved into the mountains atop the 2,058 m (6,752 ft)-high Col du Lautaret, the pass that directly precedes the Galibier climb from the south. In 1949, a monument to Desgrange was built 150 m (492 ft) from the southern entrance of the summit tunnel atop the Col du Galibier in the Alps, his favourite and one of the Tour's most iconic climbs. A wreath is laid at the monument when the Tour passes. Beginning in 1952, the marking point for the prize took place by the monument for the subsequent times the Tour visited the Galibier. Since the 1965 Tour, the Galibier has always been used when it was passed.

The tunnel at the summit of the Galibier was closed for safety reasons in 1976 – eventually re-opening in 2002. Bypassing the tunnel, the road was then extended a further kilometre up to the natural crest of the pass, increasing the elevation of the summit by 86 meters to 2,642 m (8,668 ft). This has been the award's marking point on the Galibier ever since it was first traversed in the 1979 Tour, when Lucien Van Impe claimed the award. The tunnel was passed through on stage 19 of the 2011 Tour, but in that edition the Galibier was climbed twice in celebration the 100th anniversary of its appearance in the Tour. The finish of the previous stage was atop the full Galibier climb, where Andy Schleck claimed memorable stage win as well as the award after his 60 km (37 mi) solo breakaway. This was first ever Galibier summit stage finish and the highest ever Tour stage finish in history to that point. Further notable stages featuring the award on the Galibier were in the 1952 and 1998 Tours, when Italians Fausto Coppi and Marco Pantani, respectively, took the award and then went on to win the stage, which proved decisive to both their overall general classification victories.

Non-summit marking points have been sparsely used for the award. Beauvallon was a host for a total of six times, with a final appearance in the 1964 Tour. The village of Cysoing in the far north hosted on the 1956 Tour, marking 200,000 kilometres travelled in Tour de France history. Only twice have non-summit marking points happened since 1964. Stage 11 of the 1978 race saw the award given to Christian Seznec at the legendary village of Sainte-Marie de Campan in the valley between the Col du Tourmalet and Col d'Aspin in the Pyrenees, made famous when in the 1913 Tour, per the rules, Eugène Christophe was forced walk 14 km (9 mi) down the Tourmalet carrying his bicycle broken before repairing it at a forge in Campan. The last time a non-summit point took place during the Grand Départ (opening stages) of the 1981 Tour, hosted by Nice, with the award at first planned to take place in the final kilometres of stage 1a beside the Carrefour supermarket on the Promenade des Anglais. This break from tradition was seen by the media as disrespectful to the race and the legacy of Desgrange. For unknown reasons the marking point banner was stolen the night before. The replacement banner was strung up in the Landes forest 42 km (26 mi) before the end of stage 7 in Bordeaux, which was won unexpectedly by Theo de Rooij as a result of him being at the front of the leading breakaway group.

From the 1965 Tour onwards, if the Galibier was not passed then the award was instead given atop a climb of similarly equal height, most commonly the Tourmalet, and beginning with the 1997 Tour, the highest climb of a Tour was mostly used when the Galibier was not included. Between the 2013 Tour and the 2023 Tour, the highest climb was always used. The 2024 Tour saw the award return to the Galibier, despite a higher climb occurring on stage 19. On two occasions, the Galibier climb was cancelled due to bad weather and the award locations were moved; snow in 1996 saw it replaced by the 1,709 m (5,607 ft)-high Pyreenan Col d'Aubisque, and landslides in 2015 moved the award to 2,250 m (7,382 ft)-high Alpine Col d'Allos.

The amount of cash given as a prize for the award was higher in the early Tours. Cash prizes have also been given to the second and third placed riders. Since 2003, the winner has received a €5000 prize. Only in the 1963 Tour has the award not been given, although at the conclusion of that race there was a special "Desgrange prize" given to the general classification winner Jacques Anquetil who was adjudged to have had the best "head and legs" throughout the Tour. The Souvenir Jacques Goddet, honouring the second Tour director Jacques Goddet, is a similar award in the race given since the 2001 Tour mostly atop the Tourmalet.

== Locations and winners ==
Key
| * | Col du Galibier was passed but not used for the award |
| ^ | Highest point of elevation reached on that year's Tour |
| ‡ | Winner of the award also won the overall general classification |
| † | Winner of the award also won the stage finish |
| Winner (#) | Multiple award winner and number of times they had won the award at that point |

List of Souvenir Henri Desgrange locations and winners (Note: The award marking point location's of climbs were taken at the summit.)
| Year | Stage | Location | Elevation | Winner | Nationality | Team | Cash prize | Ref |
|---|---|---|---|---|---|---|---|---|
| 1947 | 11 | Beauvallon, Grimaud ^{*} | 1.5 m (5 ft) | Raymond Impanis | Belgium | Belgium | F 35,000 | |
| 1948 | 1 | Côte de Picardie ^{*} | 178 m (584 ft) | Roger Lambrecht | Belgium | Internationals | F 30,000 | |
| 1949 | 15 | Beauvallon, Grimaud | 1.5 m (5 ft) | Paul Giguet | France | South-East | F 60,000 | |
| 1950 | 19 | Col du Lautaret | 2,058 m (6,752 ft) | Apo Lazaridès | France | France | F 75,000 | |
| 1951 | 21 | Col du Lautaret | 2,058 m (6,752 ft) | Gino Sciardis | France | Île-de-France/North-West | F 30,000 | |
| 1952 | 11 | Col du Galibier | 2,556 m (8,386 ft) ^{^} | Fausto Coppi ^{‡}^{†} | Italy | Italy | F 40,000 | |
| 1953 | 16 | Beauvallon, Grimaud | 1.5 m (5 ft) | Claude Colette | France | South-West | F 100,000 | |
| 1954 | 19 | Col du Galibier | 2,556 m (8,386 ft) ^{^} | Federico Bahamontes | Spain | Spain | F 100,000 | |
| 1955 | 10 | Beauvallon, Grimaud ^{*} | 1.5 m (5 ft) | André Darrigade | France | France | F 100,000 | |
| 1956 | 2 | Cysoing (Note: The award marking point at Cysoing, 13 km (8 mi) from the finish in Lille, marked 200,000 km (124,274 mi) travelled in Tour de France history.) | unknown | Pierre Pardoën | France | North-East/Centre | F 100,000 | |
| 1957 | 12 | Beauvallon, Grimaud ^{*} | 1.5 m (5 ft) | Jean Stablinski ^{†} | France | France | F 100,000 | |
| 1958 | 21 | Col du Lautaret | 2,058 m (6,752 ft) | Piet van Est | Netherlands | Netherlands/Luxembourg | F 100,000 | |
| 1959 | 18 | Col du Galibier | 2,556 m (8,386 ft) | Charly Gaul | Luxembourg | Netherlands/Luxembourg | F 100,000 | |
| 1960 | 17 | Col du Lautaret | 2,058 m (6,752 ft) | Jean Graczyk ^{†} | France | France | F 200,000 | |
| 1961 | 6 | Ballon d'Alsace | 1,178 m (3,865 ft) | Jef Planckaert ^{†} | Belgium | Belgium | F 2,000 | |
| 1962 | 19 | Col du Lautaret | 2,058 m (6,752 ft) | Juan Campillo | Spain | Margnat–Paloma–D'Alessandro | F 2,000 | |
| 1963 | Not awarded (Note: At the conclusion of the 1963 Tour de France, there was a special Desgrange prize given to the cyclist who rode the best "head and legs". Jacques Anquetil won this prize.) | | | | | | | |
| 1964 | 10a | Beauvallon, Grimaud ^{*} | 1.5 m (5 ft) | André Darrigade (2) | France | Margnat–Paloma–Dunlop | F 2,000 | |
| 1965 | 17 | Col du Lautaret | 2,058 m (6,752 ft) | Francisco Gabica | Spain | Kas–Kaskol | F 2,000 | |
| 1966 | 16 | Col du Galibier | 2,556 m (8,386 ft) ^{^} | Julio Jiménez ^{†} | Spain | Ford France–Hutchinson | F 2,000 | |
| 1967 | 10 | Col du Galibier | 2,556 m (8,386 ft) ^{^} | Julio Jiménez (2) | Spain | Spain | F 2,000 | |
| 1968 | 19 | Col des Aravis | 1,498 m (4,915 ft) | Barry Hoban ^{†} | Great Britain | Great Britain | F 2,000 | |
| 1969 | 10 | Col du Galibier | 2,556 m (8,386 ft) ^{^} | Eddy Merckx ^{‡} | Belgium | Faema | F 2,000 | |
| 1970 | 19 | Col du Soulor | 1,474 m (4,836 ft) | Raymond Delisle | France | Peugeot–BP–Michelin | F 2,000 | |
| 1971 | 19 | Côte de Dourdan | 160 m (525 ft) | Wilmo Francioni | Italy | Ferretti | F 2,000 | |
| 1972 | 14a | Col du Galibier | 2,556 m (8,386 ft) ^{^} | Joop Zoetemelk | Netherlands | Beaulieu–Flandria | F 2,000 | |
| 1973 | 8 | Col du Galibier | 2,556 m (8,386 ft) ^{^} | Luis Ocaña ^{‡}^{†} | Spain | Bic | F 2,000 | |
| 1974 | 11 | Col du Galibier | 2,556 m (8,386 ft) ^{^} | Vicente López Carril ^{†} | Spain | Kas–Kaskol | F 2,500 | |
| 1975 | 17 | Col du Télégraphe | 1,566 m (5,138 ft) | Luis Balague | Spain | Super Ser | F 2,500 | |
| 1976 | 10 | Col du Lautaret | 2,058 m (6,752 ft) | Luciano Conati | Italy | Scic–Fiat | F 2,000 | |
| 1977 | 2 | Col du Tourmalet | 2,115 m (6,939 ft) ^{^} | Lucien Van Impe | Belgium | Lejeune–BP | ƒ 1,400 | |
| 1978 | 11 | Sainte-Marie de Campan | 857 m (2,812 ft) | Christian Seznec | France | Miko–Mercier–Vivagel | ƒ 2,000 | |
| 1979 | 17 | Col du Galibier | 2,642 m (8,668 ft) ^{^} | Lucien Van Impe (2) | Belgium | Kas–Campagnolo | unknown | |
| 1980 | 17 | Col du Galibier | 2,642 m (8,668 ft) ^{^} | Johan De Muynck | Belgium | Splendor–Admiral | F 10,000 | |
| 1981 | 7 | Landes forest (Note: The 1981 Tour de France award on stage 1a was cancelled following the theft of the marking point banner in Nice. The location was moved to 185 km (115 mi) into the 227 km (141 mi)-long stage 7.) | unknown | Theo de Rooij | Netherlands | Capri Sonne–Koga Miyata | F 5,000 | |
| 1982 | 12 | Col d'Aubisque | 1,709 m (5,607 ft) | Beat Breu | Switzerland | Cilo–Aufina | F 5,000 | |
| 1983 | 10 | Col du Tourmalet | 2,115 m (6,939 ft) ^{^} | José Patrocinio Jiménez | Colombia | Varta–Colombia | F 8,500 | |
| 1984 | 18 | Col du Galibier | 2,642 m (8,668 ft) ^{^} | Francisco Rodríguez Maldonado | Colombia | Splendor–Mondial Moquettes–Marc | ƒ 2,500 | |
| 1985 | 17 | Col du Tourmalet | 2,115 m (6,939 ft) ^{^} | Pello Ruiz Cabestany | Spain | Seat–Orbea | F 10,000 | |
| 1986 | 18 | Col du Galibier | 2,642 m (8,668 ft) ^{^} | Luis Herrera | Colombia | Café de Colombia–Varta | F 12,000 | |
| 1987 | 21 | Col du Galibier | 2,642 m (8,668 ft) ^{^} | Pedro Muñoz | Spain | Fagor–MBK | ƒ 7,000 | |
| 1988 | 15 | Col du Tourmalet | 2,115 m (6,939 ft) ^{^} | Laudelino Cubino ^{†} | Spain | BH | unknown | |
| 1989 | 17 | Col du Galibier | 2,642 m (8,668 ft) ^{^} | Gert-Jan Theunisse ^{†} | Netherlands | PDM–Ultima–Concorde | unknown | |
| 1990 | 16 | Col du Tourmalet | 2,115 m (6,939 ft) ^{^} | Miguel Ángel Martínez Torres | Spain | ONCE | unknown | |
| 1991 | 13 | Col du Tourmalet | 2,115 m (6,939 ft) ^{^} | Claudio Chiappucci ^{†} | Italy | Carrera Jeans–Tassoni | F 30,000 | |
| 1992 | 14 | Col du Galibier | 2,642 m (8,668 ft) | Franco Chioccioli | Italy | GB–MG Maglificio | ƒ 7,000 | |
| 1993 | 10 | Col du Galibier | 2,642 m (8,668 ft) | Tony Rominger ^{†} | Switzerland | CLAS–Cajastur | unknown | |
| 1994 | 12 | Col du Tourmalet | 2,115 m (6,939 ft) | Richard Virenque ^{†} | France | Festina–Lotus | F 30,000 | |
| 1995 | 15 | Col du Tourmalet | 2,115 m (6,939 ft) ^{^} | Richard Virenque ^{†}(2) | France | Festina–Lotus | unknown | |
| 1996 | 17 | Col d'Aubisque (Note: In the 1996 Tour de France, the Col du Galibier and the highest climb of the race, the Col de l'Iseran, were both cancelled because of bad weather.) | 1,709 m (5,607 ft) | Neil Stephens | Australia | ONCE | F 20,000 | |
| 1997 | 10 | Port d'Envalira | 2,407 m (7,897 ft) ^{^} | Richard Virenque (3) | France | Festina–Lotus | unknown | |
| 1998 | 15 | Col du Galibier | 2,642 m (8,668 ft) ^{^} | Marco Pantani ^{‡}^{†} | Italy | Mercatone Uno–Bianchi | unknown | |
| 1999 | 9 | Col du Galibier | 2,642 m (8,668 ft) ^{^} | José Luis Arrieta | Spain | Banesto | F 20,000 | |
| 2000 | 15 | Col du Galibier | 2,642 m (8,668 ft) ^{^} | Pascal Hervé | France | Banesto | F 20,000 | |
| 2001 | 10 | Col de la Madeleine | 2,000 m (6,562 ft) | Laurent Roux | France | Jean Delatour | F 20,000 | |
| 2002 | 16 | Col du Galibier | 2,642 m (8,668 ft) ^{^} | Santiago Botero | Colombia | Kelme–Costa Blanca | €3,000 | |
| 2003 | 8 | Col du Galibier | 2,642 m (8,668 ft) ^{^} | Stefano Garzelli | Italy | Vini Caldirola–So.di | €5,000 | |
| 2004 | 17 | Col de la Madeleine | 2,000 m (6,562 ft) ^{^} | Gilberto Simoni | Italy | Saeco | €5,000 | |
| 2005 | 11 | Col du Galibier | 2,642 m (8,668 ft) ^{^} | Alexander Vinokourov ^{†} | Kazakhstan | T-Mobile Team | €5,000 | |
| 2006 | 16 | Col du Galibier | 2,642 m (8,668 ft) ^{^} | Michael Rasmussen ^{†} | Denmark | Rabobank | €5,000 | |
| 2007 | 9 | Col du Galibier | 2,642 m (8,668 ft) | Mauricio Soler ^{†} | Colombia | Barloworld | €5,000 | |
| 2008 | 17 | Col du Galibier | 2,642 m (8,668 ft) | ~~Stefan Schumacher~~ (Note: Schumacher's Tour de France results, including his two stage victories in 2008, were annulled by ASO.) | Germany | Gerolsteiner | €5,000 | |
| 2009 | 16 | Col du Grand-Saint-Bernard | 2,470 m (8,104 ft) ^{^} | ~~Franco Pellizotti~~ (Note: In March 2011, all of Italian Franco Pellizotti's results since 7 May 2009 were disqualified after the Court of Arbitration for Sport found his biological passport indicated irregular values.) | Italy | Liquigas | €5,000 | |
| 2010 | 17 | Col du Tourmalet | 2,115 m (6,939 ft) ^{^} | Andy Schleck ^{‡} (Note: The 2010 Tour de France was initially won by Alberto Contador, who was later revealed to have failed a doping test. The Court of Arbitration for Sport decided on 6 February 2012 that Contador lost his results from 2010, declaring Andy Schleck the new winner.)^{†} | Luxembourg | Team Saxo Bank | €5,000 | |
| 2011 | 18 | Col du Galibier | 2,642 m (8,668 ft) | Andy Schleck ^{†}(2) | Luxembourg | Leopard Trek | €5,000 | |
| 2012 | 11 | Col de la Croix de Fer | 2,067 m (6,781 ft) | Fredrik Kessiakoff | Sweden | Astana | €5,000 | |
| 2013 | 8 | Port de Pailhères | 2,001 m (6,565 ft) ^{^} | Nairo Quintana | Colombia | Movistar Team | €5,000 | |
| 2014 | 14 | Col d'Izoard | 2,360 m (7,743 ft) ^{^} | Joaquim Rodríguez | Spain | Team Katusha | €5,000 | |
| 2015 | 20 | Col d'Allos (Note: The summit of the Col du Galibier was planned to be used as the marking point for the award on the 2015 Tour de France. but landslides prior to the race forced its cancellation. It would have also been the highest point of the race, and the second highest, the Col d'Allos, was used in replacement.) | 2,250 m (7,382 ft) ^{^} | Simon Geschke | Germany | Team Giant–Alpecin | €5,000 | |
| 2016 | 10 | Port d'Envalira | 2,407 m (7,897 ft) ^{^} | Rui Costa | Portugal | Lampre–Merida | €5,000 | |
| 2017 | 17 | Col du Galibier | 2,642 m (8,668 ft) ^{^} | Primož Roglič ^{†} | Slovenia | LottoNL–Jumbo | €5,000 | |
| 2018 | 17 | Col de Portet | 2,215 m (7,267 ft) ^{^} | Nairo Quintana ^{†}(2) | Colombia | Movistar Team | €5,000 | |
| 2019 | 19 | Col de l'Iseran ^{*} | 2,770 m (9,088 ft) ^{^} | Egan Bernal ^{‡} (Note: Stage 19 of the 2019 Tour de France was stopped atop the Col de l'Iseran after hailstorms and mudslides made the road impracticable near Val-d'Isère, before the planned final climb and finish at Tignes. The stage victory was not awarded.) | Colombia | Team INEOS | €5,000 | |
| 2020 | 17 | Col de la Loze | 2,304 m (7,559 ft) ^{^} | Miguel Ángel López ^{†} | Colombia | Astana | €5,000 | |
| 2021 | 15 | Port d'Envalira | 2,407 m (7,897 ft) ^{^} | Nairo Quintana (3) | Colombia | Arkéa–Samsic | €5,000 | |
| 2022 | 11 | Col du Galibier | 2,642 m (8,668 ft) ^{^} | Warren Barguil | France | Arkéa–Samsic | €5,000 | |
| 2023 | 17 | Col de la Loze | 2,304 m (7,559 ft) ^{^} | Felix Gall ^{†} | Austria | AG2R Citroën Team | €5,000 | |
| 2024 | 4 | Col du Galibier | 2,628 m (8,622 ft) | Tadej Pogačar ^{‡}^{†} | Slovenia | UAE Team Emirates | €5,000 | |
| 2025 | 18 | Col de la Loze | 2,304 m (7,559 ft) ^{^} | Ben O'Connor ^{†} | Australia | Team Jayco–AlUla | €5,000 | |
| 2026 | 20 | Col du Galibier | 2,628 m (8,622 ft) ^{^} | Richard Carapaz ^{†} | Ecuador | EF Education–EasyPost | €5,000 | |

=== Multiple winners ===
The following riders have won the Souvenir Henri Desgrange on 2 or more occasions.

Multiple winners of the Souvenir Henri Desgrange
| Cyclist | Total | Years |
|---|---|---|
| Richard Virenque (FRA) | 3 | 1994, 1995, 1997 |
| Nairo Quintana (COL) | 3 | 2013, 2018, 2021 |
| André Darrigade (FRA) | 2 | 1955, 1964 |
| Julio Jiménez (ESP) | 2 | 1966, 1967 |
| Lucien Van Impe (BEL) | 2 | 1977, 1979 |
| Andy Schleck (LUX) | 2 | 2010, 2011 |

=== Winners by nationality ===
Riders from eighteen different countries have won the Souvenir Henri Desgrange.

Souvenir Henri Desgrange winners by nationality
| Country | No. of wins | No. of winning cyclists |
|---|---|---|
| France | 17 | 14 |
| Spain | 14 | 13 |
| Colombia | 10 | 8 |
| Italy | 8 | 8 |
| Belgium | 7 | 6 |
| Netherlands | 4 | 4 |
| Luxembourg | 3 | 2 |
| Australia | 2 | 2 |
| Slovenia | 2 | 2 |
| Austria | 1 | 1 |
| Denmark | 1 | 1 |
| Ecuador | 1 | 1 |
| Germany | 1 | 1 |
| Great Britain | 1 | 1 |
| Kazakhstan | 1 | 1 |
| Portugal | 1 | 1 |
| Sweden | 1 | 1 |
| Switzerland | 1 | 1 |

=== Souvenir Henri Desgrange Locations ===
Most times Souvenir Henri Desgrange Locations
| Col | Total | Last |
|---|---|---|
| Col du Galibier | 31 | Richard Carapaz in 2026 |
| Col du Tourmalet | 9 | Andy Schleck in 2010 |
| Col du Lautaret | 7 | Luciano Conati in 1976 |
| Beauvallon, Grimaud | 6 | André Darrigade in 1964 |
| Port d'Envalira | 3 | Nairo Quintana in 2021 |
| Col de la Loze | 3 | Ben O'Connor in 2025 |
| Col d'Aubisque | 2 | Neil Stephens in 1996 |
| Col de la Madeleine | 2 | Gilberto Simoni in 2004 |
| 16 locations | 1 | Iseran (Egan Bernal, 2019) |

== See also ==
- Cima Coppi – a similar award given in Italy's Grand Tour, the Giro d'Italia.

== Bibliography ==
- Augendre, Jacques (2019). Guide historique [Historical guide] (PDF) (in French). Paris: Amaury Sport Organisation. Archived (PDF) from the original on 27 November 2019.
- Clemitson, Suze (2015). P is for Peloton: The A-Z of Cycling. London: Bloomsbury Publishing. ISBN 978-1-4729-1285-5.
- Clemitson, Suze (2017). A History of Cycling in 100 Objects. London: Bloomsbury Publishing. ISBN 978-1-4729-1889-5.
- Dauncey, Hugh; Hare, Geoff (2004). The Tour de France, 1903–2003: A Century of Sporting Structures, Meanings, and Values. Sport in the global society. Abingdon-on-Thames, UK: Routledge. ISBN 978-0-7146-5362-4.
- Friebe, Daniel; Goding, Pete (2017). Mountain High: Europe's 50 Greatest Cycle Climbs. London: Quercus. ISBN 978-0-85738-625-0.
- McGann, Bill; McGann, Carol (2008). The Story of the Tour de France: 1965–2007. Vol. 2. Indianapolis: Dog Ear Publishing. ISBN 978-1-59858-608-4.
- Saunders, David (1976). Tour de France 1976. Keighley, UK: Kennedy Brothers Publishing. OCLC 4043734.
- Seray, Jacques [in French]; Lablaine, Jacques (2006). Henri Desgrange, l'homme qui créa le Tour de France [Henri Desgrange, the man who created the Tour de France] (in French). Saint-Malo, France: Editions Cristel. ISBN 978-2-84421-042-5.
- Thompson, Christopher S. (2008). The Tour de France: A Cultural History. Oakland, California: University of California Press. ISBN 978-0-520-25630-9.
- van den Akker, Pieter (2018). Tour de France Rules and Statistics: 1903–2018. Self-published. ISBN 978-1-79398-080-9.
