= Hutmacher =

Hutmacher (German for "hatter") is a German surname. Notable people with the surname include:

- Hans Hutmacher (1921–1956), Swiss racing cyclist
- Jean Hutmacher (1892–?), Belgian wrestler
- Jim Hutmacher (born 1953), American politician

== See also ==
- Hutmacher Farm, a farm in North Dakota, United States
- Christian Huthmacher (born 1995), Emmy Award-winning animator
