= 1949 Tour de Suisse =

Race details
- Dates: 30 July–6 August 1949
- Stages: 8
- Distance: 1,874 km (1,164 mi)
- Winning time: 55h 36' 17"

Results
	Winner	Gottfried Weilenmann (SUI)
	Second	Georges Aeschlimann (SUI)
	Third	Ernst Stettler (SUI)

The 1949 Tour de Suisse was the 13th edition of the Tour de Suisse cycle race and was held from 30 July to 6 August 1949. The race started and finished in Zürich. The race was won by Gottfried Weilenmann.

== General classification ==
Final general classification

Rank	Rider	Time
1	Gottfried Weilenmann (SUI)	55h 36' 17"
2	Georges Aeschlimann (SUI)	+ 9"
3	Ernst Stettler (SUI)	+ 11' 59"
4	André Brulé (FRA)	+ 13' 20"
5	Danilo Barozzi (ITA)	+ 17' 41"
6	Nello Sforacchi (ITA)	+ 23' 39"
7	Fritz Zbinden (SUI)	+ 24' 09"
8	Vittorio Rossello (ITA)	+ 25' 23"
9	Marcel Ernzer (LUX)	+ 28' 26"
10	Edward Peeters (BEL)	+ 33' 59"
