= 1947 Critérium du Dauphiné Libéré =

Race details
- Dates: 12–16 June 1947
- Stages: 4
- Distance: 967 km (601 mi)
- Winning time: 27h 59' 52"

Results
	Winner	Edward Klabiński (POL)	(Mercier–Hutchinson)
	Second	Gino Sciardis (FRA)	(Mercier–Hutchinson)
	Third	Fermo Camellini (ITA)	(Ray)

The 1947 Critérium du Dauphiné Libéré was the inaugural edition of the cycle race and was held from 12 June to 16 June 1947. The race started and finished in Grenoble. The race was won by Edward Klabiński of the Mercier team.

== General classification ==
Final general classification

Rank	Rider	Team	Time
1	Edward Klabiński (POL)	Mercier–Hutchinson	27h 59' 52"
2	Gino Sciardis (FRA)	Mercier–Hutchinson	+ 10"
3	Fermo Camellini (ITA)	Ray	+ 44"
4	Pierre Brambilla (FRA)	Metropole	+ 1' 02"
5	Jean Robic (FRA)	Metropole	+ 3' 24"
6	Pierre Molinéris (FRA)	Ray	+ 5' 35"
7	Pierre Cogan (FRA)	Metropole	+ 6' 38"
8	Georges Martin (FRA)	Follis	+ 6' 56"
9	Pierre Fautrier (FRA)	Ray	+ 7' 16"
10	Albert Bourlon (FRA)	Metropole	+ 8' 40"
