= Guillier =

Guillier is a surname. It may refer to:

- Alejandro Guillier Álvarez (born 1953), Chilean sociologist, television and radio journalist and politician
- Georges Guillier (1920–1983), French racing cyclist
- Lucien Guillier (1926–2019), French Olympian, discus thrower, shot putter

== See also ==
- Guilliers (Breton: Gwiler-Porc'hoed), a commune in the Morbihan department of Brittany in north-western France
