= Roubaix–Huy =

Race details
- Region: Belgium and France
- Discipline: Road
- Type: One-day race

History
- First edition: 1947
- Editions: 10
- Final edition: 1956
- First winner: Jean Engels (BEL)
- Final winner: Frans Gielen (BEL)

Roubaix–Huy was a road bicycle race held annually in Belgium and France, between Roubaix and Huy. It was first held in 1947 and held annually until 1956. It was a one-day race each year except for 1950 when there were two stages, first from Huy to Roubaix and Roubaix back to Huy the next day.

== Winners ==
| Year | Country | Rider | Team |
|---|---|---|---|
| 1947 | Belgium | Jean Engels | |
| 1948 | Belgium | Désiré Keteleer | |
| 1949 | Belgium | Julien Heernaert | |
| 1950 | Belgium | Marcel Dupont | |
| 1951 | Belgium | Marcel Hendrickx | |
| 1952 | Belgium | Robert Vanderstockt | |
| 1953 | Belgium | Karel De Baere | |
| 1954 | Belgium | Rik Van Looy | |
| 1955 | Belgium | René Vandewalle | |
| 1956 | Belgium | Frans Gielen | |
