= Grand Prix des Ardennes =

Annual bicycle race in Belgium

Race details
- Region: Belgium
- Discipline: Road
- Type: One-day race

History
- First edition: 1945
- Editions: 4
- Final edition: 1948
- First winner: Jan Engels (BEL)
- Final winner: Gaston Vandendooren (BEL)

Grand Prix des Ardennes was a one-day road bicycle race held annually in Belgium, starting and finishing in Saint-Hubert. It was first held in 1945 and held annually until 1948.

== Winners ==
Year	Country	Rider	Team
1945	Belgium	Jan Engels	
1946	Belgium	Maurice Van Herzele	
1947	Belgium	Albert Dubuisson	
1948	Belgium	Gaston Vandendooren	
