= 1945 Liège–Bastogne–Liège =

Race details
- Dates: 5 August 1945
- Stages: 1
- Distance: 208 km (129 mi)
- Winning time: 6h 21' 11"

Results
	Winner	Jan Engels (BEL)
	Second	Edward Van Dijck (BEL)
	Third	Joseph Moerenhout (BEL)

The 1945 Liège–Bastogne–Liège was the 31st edition of the Liège–Bastogne–Liège cycle race and was held on 5 August 1945. The race started and finished in Liège and was won by Jan Engels.

== General classification ==
Final general classification

Rank	Rider	Time
1	Jan Engels (BEL)	6h 21' 11"
2	Edward Van Dijck (BEL)	+ 47"
3	Joseph Moerenhout (BEL)	+ 47"
4	Sylvain Grysolle (BEL)	+ 47"
5	Huub Sijen (NED)	+ 47"
6	Odiel Van Den Meerschaut (BEL)	+ 47"
7	Louis Nackaerts (BEL)	+ 47"
8	Louis Prairie (BEL)	+ 47"
9	Joseph Hoefkens (BEL)	+ 3' 07"
10	Armand Putzeys (BEL)	+ 3' 07"
