= Alphonse De Vreese =

French cyclist

Personal information
- Born: 5 January 1922 Marquette-lez-Lille, France
- Died: 18 March 2011 (aged 89) Lille, France

Cycling career
- Sport: Cycling
- Role: Rider

Alphonse De Vreese (5 January 1922 – 18 March 2011) was a French racing cyclist. He rode in the 1947 and 1948 Tour de France.
