= Lucien Maelfait =

French cyclist

Personal information
- Born: 30 July 1919 Havré, Belgium
- Died: 5 November 2009 (aged 90)

Cycling career
- Sport: Cycling
- Role: Rider

Lucien Maelfait (30 July 1919 – 5 November 2009) was a French racing cyclist. He rode in the 1949 Tour de France.
