= Urbain Caffi =

French-Italian cyclist

Personal information
- Full name: Urbain Caffi
- Born: 10 January 1917 Legnano, Italy
- Died: 16 March 1991 (aged 74) Le Raincy, France

Cycling career
- Sport: Cycling
- Role: Rider

Urbain Caffi (10 January 1917 – 16 March 1991) was an Italian-born French racing cyclist. He won the French national road race title in 1944. He also rode in the 1947 and 1948 Tour de France.
