= Albert Ramon =

Belgian cyclist

- Ramon as Belgian champion in 1950

Personal information
- Full name: Albert Ramon
- Born: 1 November 1920 Bruges, Belgium
- Died: 21 March 1993 (aged 72) Eeklo, Belgium

Cycling career
- Sport: Cycling
- Role: Rider

Albert Ramon (1 November 1920 – 21 March 1993) was a Belgian racing cyclist. He won the Belgian national road race title in 1950. He also rode in the 1948 Tour de France.
