= Hutmacher Farm =

- U.S. National Register of Historic Places
- U.S. Historic district
- Location within North Dakota Location within the United States
- Nearest city: Manning, North Dakota
- Coordinates: 47.28026°N 102.92896°W
- Area: 15.7 acres (6.4 ha)
- Built: 1911
- Built by: Frank Hutmacher, Valentine Hutmacher
- Architectural style: Vernacular East European, Other
- NRHP reference No.: 79001772
- Added to NRHP: December 17, 1979

The Hutmacher Farm near Manning, North Dakota, United States, is a farm that was first developed in 1911. The farm exemplifies the architecture of ethnic Germans. The farm was owned by the Hutmacher family, Black Sea German immigrants from South Russia (now southern Ukraine).

Also known as the Frank Hutmacher Farm or the Valentine Hutmacher Farm, it was listed on the National Register of Historic Places in 1979. The listing included six contributing buildings, three contributing sites and a contributing structure.

The farm site consists of five buildings: the farmhouse, garage/summer kitchen, granary, chicken coop and barn. To the east are the remains of Valentine Hutmacher's original homestead and the spring well where the families obtained water. To the west is a ridge that contains coal used for heating and cooking.

The Hutmacher home consists of five rooms: two bedrooms, a living room, kitchen, and foyer/pantry. The house was built in stages between 1928 and 1962.

The granary is directly north of the house. Its design and structure are the same as the house, with the doorway facing south. As its name implies, the granary stored harvested grain. Cured meats were buried in the grain in the fall when the weather turned cold. During the winter the family would uncover ham, sausage, and bacon as it was needed.

The building directly west of the granary was multi-purpose. Its main structure functioned as a kitchen in the summer and a garage in the winter. To keep the house cool in the summer, it was typical on many farms at the time to have a summer kitchen so cooking and baking would not heat up the house. The garage/summer kitchen is where the family butchered and processed meat. A meat hook is still present in the rafters and the stove still stands in one corner of the building. Shelves on the wall held jars of processed food.

The chicken coop was built sometime in the 1950s using the same construction method as the other buildings on the site, with one exception. In addition to the branches used to support the clay roof, wire and pieces of scrap iron augmented the branches. Current speculation is that wire may have been used to help hold the clay in place.

The barn is south of the house. Of all the buildings on the site, this is in the worst condition. The barn housed milk cows and stored hay and grain.

The site is owned by the non-profit Preservation North Dakota. The site is being rebuilt and restored.
