= César Marcelak =

French cyclist (1913–2005)

Personal information
- Born: 5 January 1913 Mülheim, France
- Died: 17 February 2005 (aged 92) Liévin, France

Cycling career
- Sport: Cycling
- Role: Rider

César Marcelak (5 January 1913 – 17 February 2005) was a French road racing cyclist. In 1952 he won the Grand Prix d'Isbergues. He also rode in the 1948 and 1949 Tour de France.
