= Paul Pineau =

French cyclist

Personal information
- Born: 7 December 1923 Le Louroux-Béconnais, France
- Died: 13 March 2006 (aged 82) Agen, France

Cycling career
- Sport: Cycling
- Role: Rider

Paul Pineau (7 December 1923 – 13 March 2006) was a French racing cyclist. He rode in the 1949 Tour de France.
