= Bruno Garonzi =

Italian cyclist

Personal information
- Born: 18 August 1926 Venice, Italy
- Died: 11 January 1950 (aged 23) Tréville France

Cycling career
- Sport: Cycling
- Role: Italian racing cyclist

Bruno Garonzi (18 August 1926 – 11 January 1950) was an Italian racing cyclist. He rode in the 1949 Tour de France. He died at age twenty-three following stomach surgery to treat what was described as an "incurable disease".

== Major results ==
1949
2nd Critérium des Pyrénéens, (Circuit des Cols Pyrénéens), France
13th Stage 1 Tour de France, Reims (Champagne-Ardenne), France
73rd Stage 2 Tour de France, Brussel/Bruxelles (Brussels Hoofdstedelijk Gewest), Belgium
abandoned Stage 3 Tour de France
2nd Critérium cycliste international de Quillan, (Quillan), Quillan (Languedoc-Roussillon), France
2nd Saarland Rundfahrt, Germany
