= Lucien Mathys =

Belgian cyclist

Personal information
- Born: 9 April 1924 Zevergem, Belgium
- Died: 19 December 2010 (aged 86) Gavere, Belgium

Cycling career
- Sport: Cycling
- Role: Rider

Lucien Mathys (9 April 1924 – 19 December 2010) was a Belgian racing cyclist. He rode in the 1948 Tour de France.
