= Jacques Pras =

French cyclist

Personal information
- Full name: Jacques Pras
- Born: 12 June 1924 Bréville, Charente, France
- Died: 18 July 1982 (aged 58) Cognac, France

Cycling career
- Sport: Cycling
- Discipline: Road
- Role: Rider

Major wins
- 1 stage Tour de France

Jacques Pras (12 June 1924 – 18 July 1982) was a French professional road bicycle racer. His most important victory was the 4th stage of the 1948 Tour de France.

== Major results ==
1948
Tour de France:

Winner stage 4

1950
Brive
1958
Allasac
