= Roger Ghyselinck =

Belgian cyclist

Personal information
- Born: 6 February 1924 Ghent, Belgium
- Died: 29 October 2005 (aged 81) Beringen, Belgium

Cycling career
- Sport: Cycling
- Role: Rider

Roger Ghyselinck (6 February 1924 – 29 October 2005) was a Belgian racing cyclist. He rode in the 1949 Tour de France.
