= Antoine Gomez =

French cyclist

Personal information
- Born: 26 August 1927 Rendufe, Portugal
- Died: 1 January 2010 (aged 82) Effiat, France

Cycling career
- Sport: Cycling
- Role: Rider

Antoine Gomez (26 August 1927 – January 2010) was a Portuguese-French racing cyclist. He rode in the 1949 Tour de France, abandoning the race during the second stage.
