= Wim de Ruyter =

Dutch cyclist

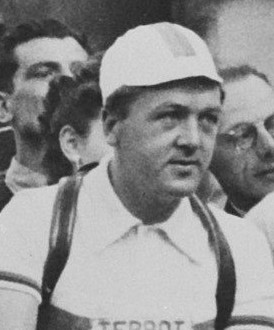
- Wim de Ruyter (1950)

Personal information
- Born: 11 November 1918 Maassluis, Netherlands
- Died: 21 November 1995 (aged 77) Los Angeles, California, United States

Cycling career
- Sport: Cycling
- Role: Rider

Wim de Ruyter (11 November 1918 – 21 November 1995) was a Dutch racing cyclist. He rode in the 1948 and 1949 Tour de France.
