= Georges Ramoulux =

French cyclist

Personal information
- Born: 24 October 1920 Rueil-Malmaison, France
- Died: 5 November 2013 (aged 93) Villepinte, Aude, France

Cycling career
- Sport: Cycling
- Role: Rider

Georges Ramoulux (24 October 1920 – 5 November 2013) was a French racing cyclist. He rode in the 1948 and 1949 Tour de France.
