= Hans Hutmacher =

Swiss cyclist

Personal information
- Born: 22 June 1921 Bremgarten, Aargau, Switzerland
- Died: 21 June 1956 (aged 34) Zürich, Switzerland

Cycling career
- Sport: Cycling
- Role: Rider

Hans Hutmacher (22 June 1921 – 21 June 1956) was a Swiss racing cyclist. He rode in the 1949 Tour de France.
