= Georges Guillier =

French cyclist

Personal information
- Born: 21 August 1920 Paris, France
- Died: 14 August 1983 (aged 62) Rochefort-sur-Mer, France

Cycling career
- Sport: Cycling
- Role: Rider

Georges Guillier (21 August 1920 – 14 August 1983) was a French racing cyclist. He rode in the 1949 Tour de France.
