= Ernst Stettler =

Swiss cyclist

Personal information
- Born: 17 July 1921 Mellikon, Switzerland
- Died: 28 August 2001 (aged 80) Mellikon, Switzerland

Cycling career
- Sport: Cycling
- Role: Rider

Ernst Stettler (17 July 1921 – 28 August 2001) was a Swiss racing cyclist. He rode in the 1949 Tour de France.
