= Pierre Baratin =

French cyclist

Personal information
- Born: 7 September 1920 Saint-Étienne-la-Varenne, France
- Died: 23 May 1995 (aged 74) Gleizé, France

Cycling career
- Sport: Cycling
- Role: Rider

Pierre Baratin (7 September 1920 – 23 May 1995) was a French racing cyclist. He rode in the 1948 Tour de France.
