= Jan Engels =

Belgian cyclist

- Engels in 1948

Personal information
- Full name: Jan Engels
- Nickname: de Krol
- Born: 11 May 1922 Sint-Genesius-Rode, Belgium
- Died: 17 April 1972 (aged 49) Heverlee, Belgium

Cycling career
- Sport: Cycling
- Discipline: Road
- Role: Rider

Major wins
- Liège–Bastogne–Liège (1945)

Jan Engels or Jean Engels (11 May 1922, Sint-Genesius-Rode – 17 April 1972, Heverlee) was a former Belgian professional road bicycle racer. He was professional from 1945 to 1952 and won 7 victories. He wore the yellow jersey in the 1948 Tour de France. His victories included the 1945 edition of Liège–Bastogne–Liège,

== Major results ==
1944
Pamel
1945
GP des Ardennes
Liège–Bastogne–Liège
Sint-Genesius-Rode
1947
Roubaix–Huy
1948
Tour de France:

Wore yellow jersey for one day
