= Vittorio Seghezzi =

Italian racing cyclist (1924–2019)

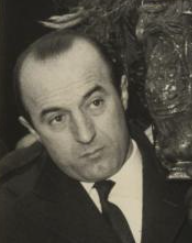

Personal information
- Full name: Vittorio Seghezzi
- Born: 27 May 1924 Romano di Lombardia, Italy
- Died: 25 October 2019 (aged 95) Castelletto Ticino, Italy

Cycling career
- Sport: Cycling
- Role: Rider

Vittorio Seghezzi (27 May 1924 – 25 October 2019) was an Italian racing cyclist. He finished in last place in the 1948 Tour de France.
