= Edward Klabiński =

Polish cyclist (1920–1997)

Personal information
- Full name: Edward Klabiński
- Born: 7 August 1920 Herne, Germany
- Died: 4 March 1997 (aged 76) Halluin, France

Cycling career
- Sport: Cycling
- Discipline: Road
- Role: Rider

Major wins
- Stage races: Critérium du Dauphiné Libéré (1947)

Edward Klabiński (7 August 1920 – 4 March 1997) was a professional racing cyclist from Poland. He was the first cyclist from Poland to take part in the Tour de France. He finished in 34th place at the 1947 Tour de France. He also rode in the 1948 Tour de France where he finished 2nd on two stages, and placed 18th overall. Klabiński won the first edition of the Critérium du Dauphiné Libéré.

== Major results ==
Sources:

- 1947
  - 1st Overall Critérium du Dauphiné Libéré
  - 1st Charleroi - Chaudfontaine
  - 1st Critérium de Charleroi
  - 1st Prix Petitjean
  - 2nd Hautmont
  - 3rd Paris-Valenciennes
- 1948
  - 1st Grand Prix de Saint-Quentin
  - 1st Lille - Calais - Lille
  - 3rd Grand Prix de Fourmies
  - 3rd Tourcoing-Dunkerque-Tourcoing
- 1949
  - 1st Lille - Calais - Lille
- 1950
  - 1st GP de Fourmies
  - 1st Lille - Calais - Lille
  - 1st Stage 3 Tour de l'Ouest
  - 6th Gent–Wevelgem
  - 9th Paris-Bruxelles
  - 9th Grand Prix des Nations
- 1951
  - 6th Grand Prix du Midi Libre
- 1952
  - 6th Overall Tour du Nord
- 1953
  - 8th Overall Tour du Nord
- 1954
  - 1st Stages 8 & 9 Course de la Paix
- 1956
  - 1st Stage 1 Tour de Champagne

=== Grand Tour general classification results timeline ===
| Grand Tour | 1947 | 1948 | 1949 |
|---|---|---|---|
| Vuelta a España | — | — | NH |
| Giro d'Italia | — | — | — |
| Tour de France | 34 | 18 | DNF |

Legend
| — | Did not compete |
| DNF | Did not finish |
| NH | Not Held |
