= Giovanni Corrieri =

Italian cyclist

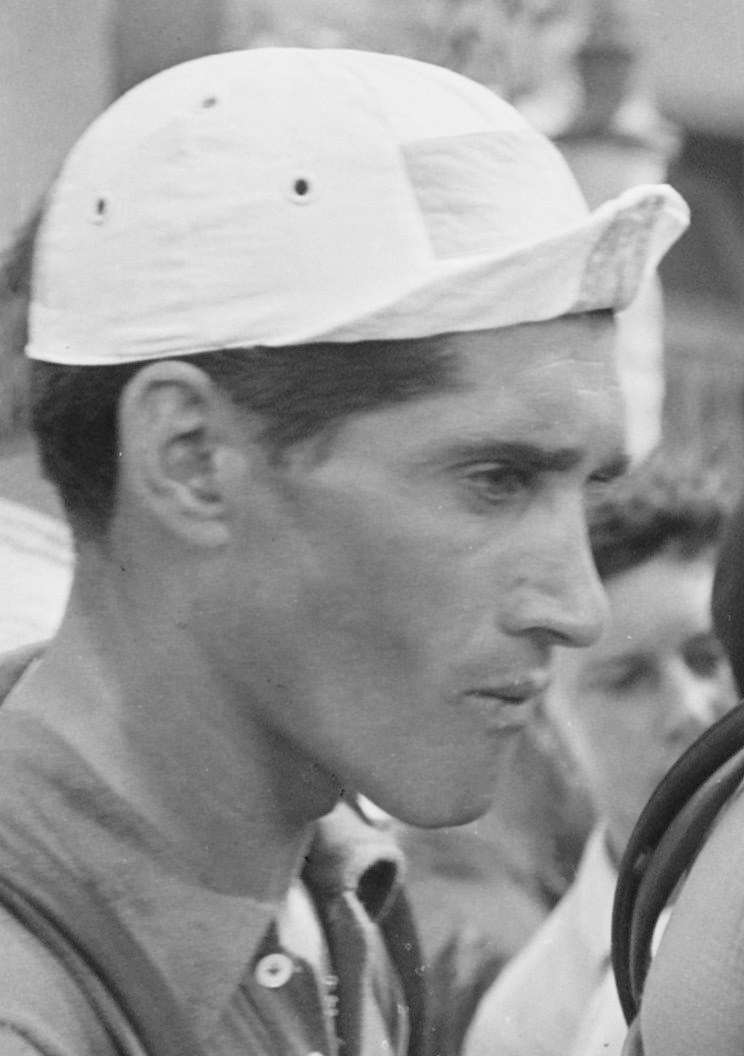

Personal information
- Full name: Giovanni Corrieri
- Born: 7 February 1920 Messina, Italy
- Died: 22 January 2017 (aged 96) Prato, Italy

Cycling career
- Sport: Cycling
- Discipline: Road
- Role: Rider

Major wins
- 7 stages Giro d'Italia; 3 stages Tour de France

Giovanni Corrieri (7 February 1920 – 22 January 2017) was a Sicilian professional road bicycle racer. Corrieri won 7 stages in the Giro d'Italia between 1947 and 1955.

Corrieri died on 22 January 2017 at the age of 96 in Prato, Tuscany.

== Major results ==
1945
Giro della Provincia Di Reggio Calabria
1947
Giro d'Italia:

Winner stage 12

1948
Tour de France:

Winner stages 18 and 21

1949
Giro d'Italia:

Winner stages 10 and 19

1950
Tour de France:

Winner stage 5

1951
Giro d'Italia:

Winner stage 9

1952
Sassari - Cagliari
1953
Giro d'Italia:

Winner stage 7A

1954
Giro d'Italia:

Winner stage 9

1955
Giro d'Italia:

Winner stage 7
