= Paul Néri =

Italian cyclist (1917–1979)

Personal information
- Born: 26 February 1917 Reggio Calabria, Italy
- Died: 28 January 1979 (aged 61) Marseille, France

Cycling career
- Sport: Cycling
- Discipline: Road
- Role: Rider

Professional teams
- 1943: Individual
- 1944–1945: Erka–Dunlop
- 1946–1947: France Sport–Dunlop
- 1948–1951: La Perle–Hutchinson

Paul Néri (26 February 1917 – 28 January 1979) was an Italian racing cyclist. He rode in the 1947, 1948 and 1949 Tour de France. Italian by birth, he was naturalized French on 5 August 1955.

== Major results ==
1947
1st Paris–Camembert
1st Grand Prix de Cannes
1948
1st Stage 1 Volta a Catalunya
3rd Tour des Quatre-Cantons
1949
2nd Paris–Tours
1950
9th Milan–San Remo
