= Georges Martin (cyclist) =

French cyclist

Personal information
- Born: 6 November 1915 Chamelet, France
- Died: 3 January 2010 (aged 94) Beaujeu, France

Cycling career
- Sport: Cycling
- Role: Rider

Georges Martin (6 November 1915 – 3 January 2010) was a French racing cyclist. He rode in the 1947, 1948 and 1949 Tour de France.
