= André Brulé (cyclist) =

French cyclist

Personal information
- Born: 4 February 1922 Billancelles, France
- Died: 3 March 2015 (aged 93)

Cycling career
- Sport: Cycling
- Role: Rider

André Brulé (4 February 1922 – 3 March 2015) was a French racing cyclist. He rode in the 1948 and 1949 Tour de France.
