= 1948 Tour de France =

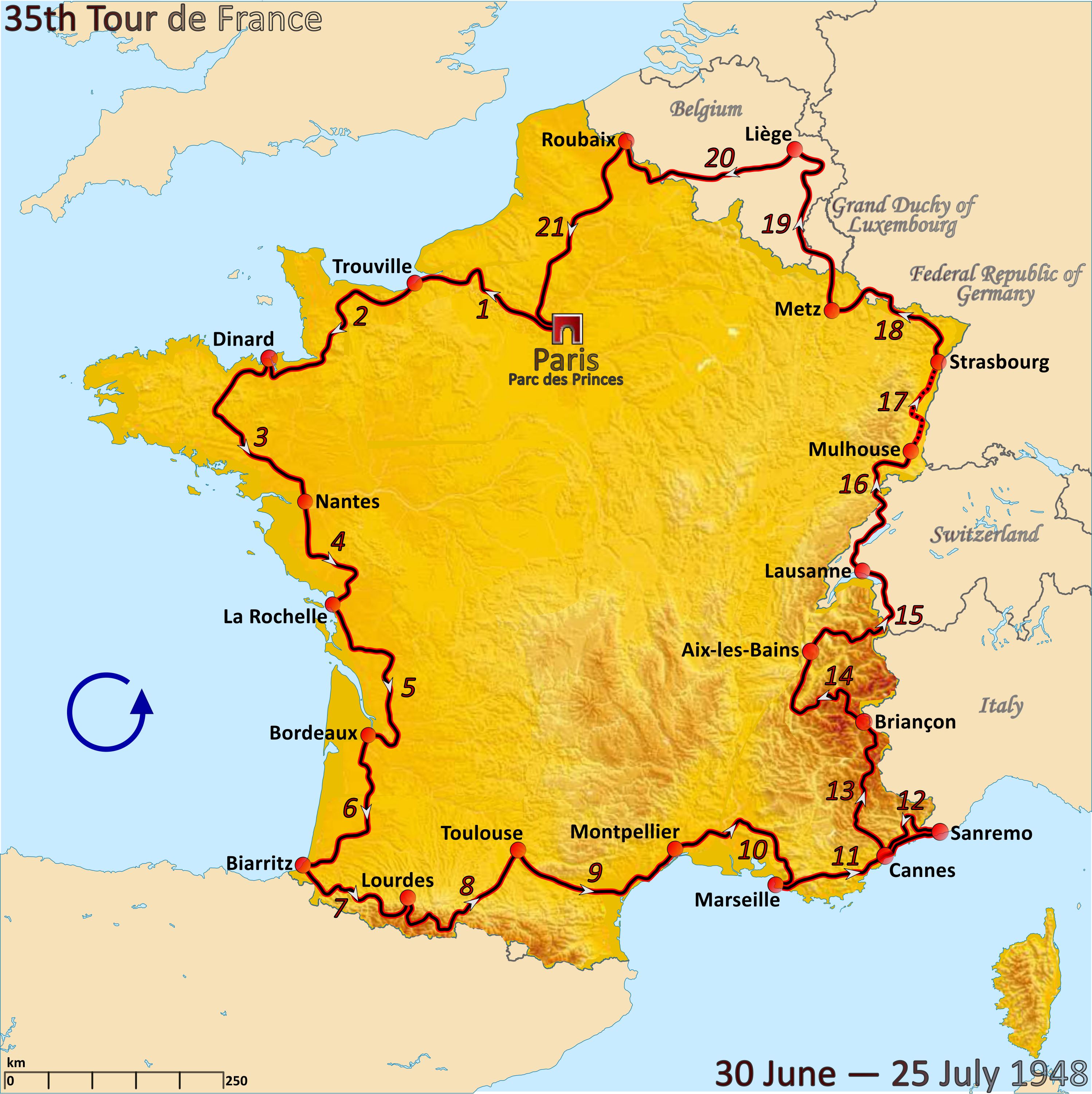
- Route of the 1948 Tour de France followed counterclockwise, starting and finishing in Paris

Race details
- Dates: 30 June – 25 July 1948
- Stages: 21
- Distance: 4,922 km (3,058 mi)
- Winning time: 147h 10' 36"

Results
Jersey awarded to the overall winner	Winner	Gino Bartali (ITA)	(Italy)
	Second	Briek Schotte (BEL)	(Belgium)
	Third	Guy Lapébie (FRA)	(Centre–South-East)
	Mountains	Gino Bartali (ITA)	(Italy)
	Team	Belgium	

The 1948 Tour de France was the 35th edition of the Tour de France, taking place from 30 June to 25 July 1948. It consisted of 21 stages over 4,922 km (3,058 mi).

The race was won by Italian cyclist Gino Bartali, who had also won the Tour de France in 1938. Bartali had almost given up during the race, but drew inspiration from a phone call from the Italian prime minister, who asked him to win the Tour de France to prevent civil unrest in Italy after assassination attempt against Togliatti. Bartali also won the mountains classification, while the team classification was won by the Belgian team.

== Innovations and changes ==
The prize for wearing the yellow jersey was introduced in 1948, sponsored by Les Laines, a French wool company.

In 1947, the media had complained that too many cyclists reached the end of the race, so the race was no longer heroic; this may have motivated a new rule between the third and the eighteenth stage, the rider last in the general classification was eliminated.

Whereas the 1947 Tour de France had been France-centred, the 1948 race became a more cosmopolitan race.

The Tour visited the Saar protectorate for the first time when the 18th stage passed Saarbrücken and Saarlouis. A second visit took place in 1953.

The first live television broadcast from the Tour de France was in 1948, when the arrival at the velodrome of Parc des Princes was broadcast live.

== Teams ==
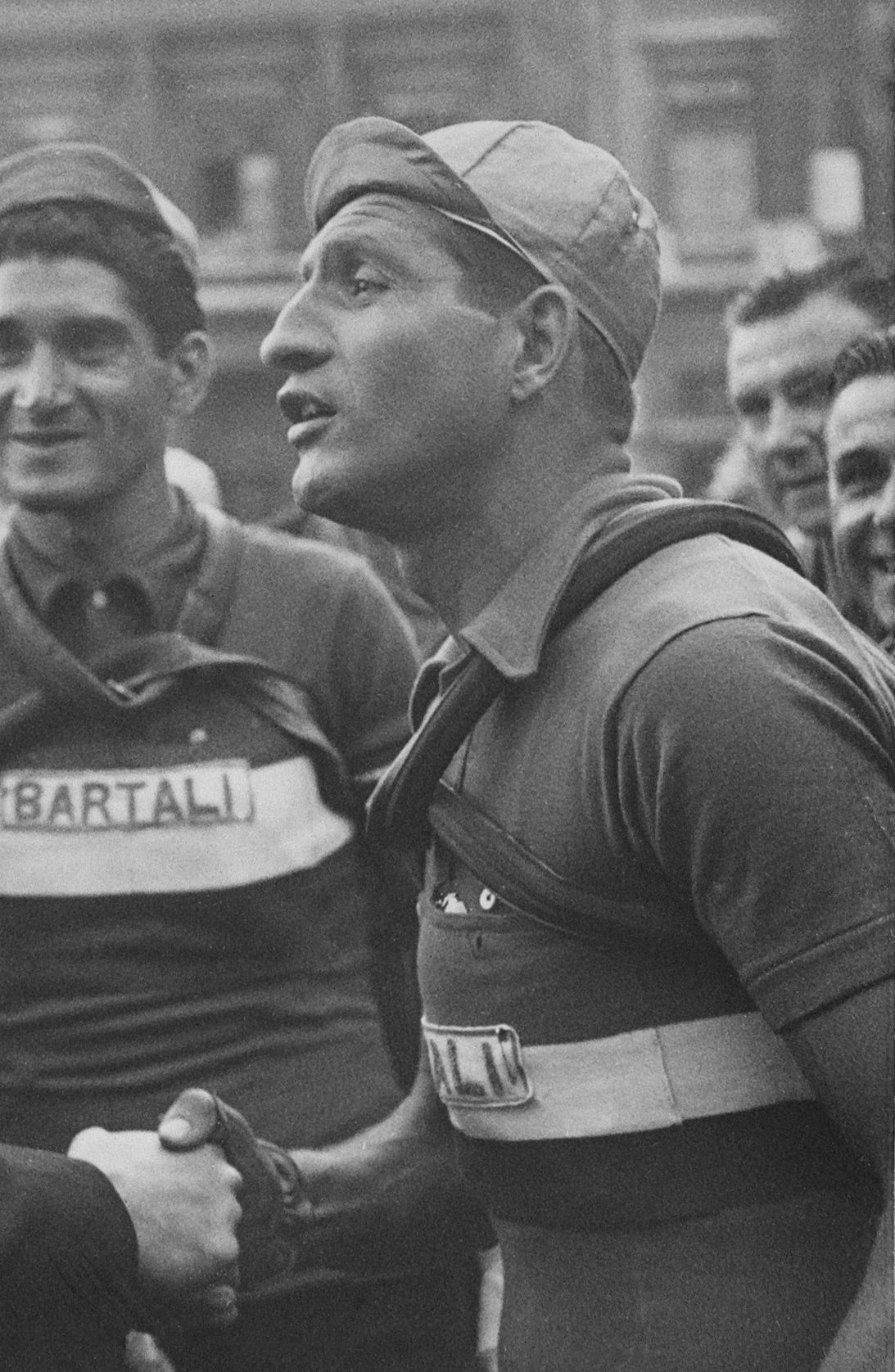
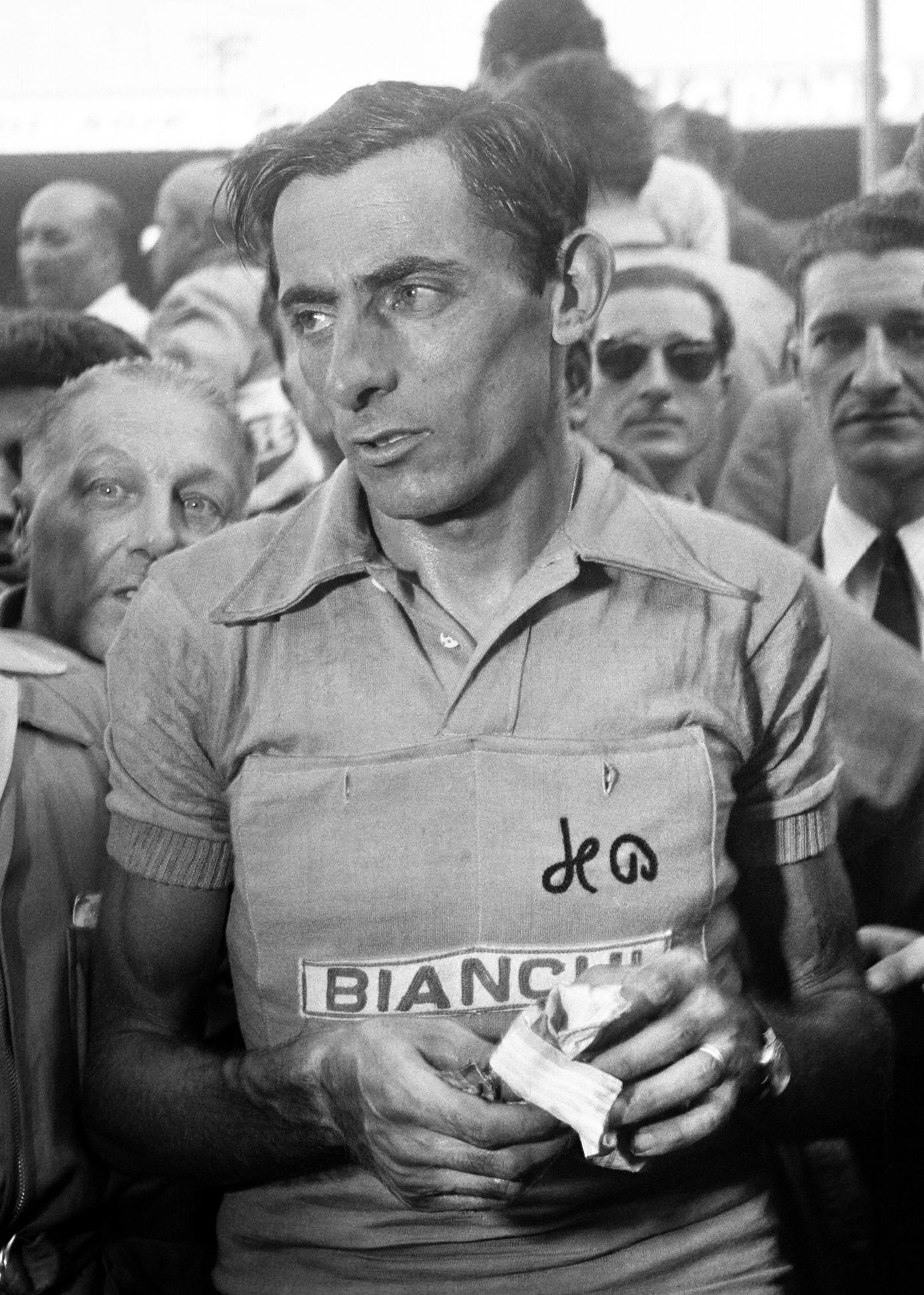
Gino Bartali (left, pictured at the 1950 Tour) and Fausto Coppi (right, pictured at the 1952 Tour)

As was the custom since the 1930 Tour de France, the 1948 Tour de France was contested by national and regional teams.

After there had not been an official Italian team allowed in the previous edition, the Italians were back. The Italian cyclists were divided between Gino Bartali and Fausto Coppi. Both argued in the preparation of the race about who would be the team leader. The Tour organisation wanted to have both cyclists in the race, so they allowed the Italians and Belgians to enter a second team.

In the end, Coppi refused to participate, and Bartali became the team leader.

The organisation still allowed the Italians and Belgians to enter a second team, but they were to be composed of young cyclists, and were named the Italy Cadets and the Belgium Aiglons.

The Tour organisation invited the Swiss to send a team, as they wanted Ferdinand Kübler, the winner of the 1948 Tour de Suisse, in the race. Kübler refused this because he could earn more money in other races. When the brothers Georges and Roger Aeschlimann announced that they wanted to join the race, they were quickly accepted, especially because they were from Lausanne, where the Tour would pass through. They were put in a team with eight non-French cyclists living in France, and were named the Internationals.

Twelve teams of ten cyclists entered the race, consisting of 60 French cyclists, 24 Italian, 22 Belgian, 6 Dutch, 4 Luxembourgian, 2 Swiss, 1 Polish and 1 Algerian cyclist.

The teams entering the race were:

- Belgium
- Netherlands/Luxembourg
- Internationals
- Italy
- France
- Belgium Aiglons
- Italy Cadets
- Centre/South-West
- Île-de-France/North-East
- West
- Paris
- South-East

== Route and stages ==
Bartali's three stage wins in a row was the last time that happened, until Mario Cipollini achieved four in a row in 1999. There were five rest days, in Biarritz, Toulouse, Cannes, Aix-les-Bains and Mulhouse. The highest point of elevation in the race was 2,556 m (8,386 ft) at the summit tunnel of the Col du Galibier mountain pass on stage 14.

Stage characteristics and winners
Stage	Date	Course	Distance	Type	Winner
1	30 June	Paris to Trouville	237 km (147 mi)	Plain stage	Gino Bartali (ITA)
2	1 July	Trouville to Dinard	259 km (161 mi)	Plain stage	Vincenzo Rossello (ITA)
3	2 July	Dinard to Nantes	251 km (156 mi)	Plain stage	Guy Lapébie (FRA)
4	3 July	Nantes to La Rochelle	166 km (103 mi)	Plain stage	Jacques Pras (FRA)
5	4 July	La Rochelle to Bordeaux	262 km (163 mi)	Plain stage	Raoul Rémy (FRA)
6	5 July	Bordeaux to Biarritz	244 km (152 mi)	Plain stage	Louison Bobet (FRA)
	6 July	Biarritz		Rest day	
7	7 July	Biarritz to Lourdes	219 km (136 mi)	Stage with mountain(s)	Gino Bartali (ITA)
8	8 July	Lourdes to Toulouse	261 km (162 mi)	Stage with mountain(s)	Gino Bartali (ITA)
	9 July	Toulouse		Rest day	
9	10 July	Toulouse to Montpellier	246 km (153 mi)	Plain stage	Raymond Impanis (BEL)
10	11 July	Montpellier to Marseille	248 km (154 mi)	Plain stage	Raymond Impanis (BEL)
11	12 July	Marseille to Sanremo	245 km (152 mi)	Plain stage	Gino Sciardis (ITA)
12	13 July	Sanremo to Cannes	170 km (106 mi)	Stage with mountain(s)	Louison Bobet (FRA)
	14 July	Cannes		Rest day	
13	15 July	Cannes to Briançon	274 km (170 mi)	Stage with mountain(s)	Gino Bartali (ITA)
14	16 July	Briançon to Aix-les-Bains	263 km (163 mi)	Stage with mountain(s)	Gino Bartali (ITA)
	17 July	Aix-les-Bains		Rest day	
15	18 July	Aix-les-Bains to Lausanne	256 km (159 mi)	Stage with mountain(s)	Gino Bartali (ITA)
16	19 July	Lausanne to Mulhouse	243 km (151 mi)	Stage with mountain(s)	Edward Van Dijck (BEL)
	20 July	Mulhouse		Rest day	
17	21 July	Mulhouse to Strasbourg	120 km (75 mi)	Individual time trial	Roger Lambrecht (BEL)
18	22 July	Strasbourg to Metz	195 km (121 mi)	Plain stage	Giovanni Corrieri (ITA)
19	23 July	Metz to Liège (Belgium)	249 km (155 mi)	Plain stage	Gino Bartali (ITA)
20	24 July	Liège (Belgium) to Roubaix	228 km (142 mi)	Plain stage	Bernard Gauthier (FRA)
21	25 July	Roubaix to Paris	286 km (178 mi)	Plain stage	Giovanni Corrieri (ITA)
	Total		4,922 km (3,058 mi)		

== Race overview ==
The margin between Gino Bartali and the leader of the race in the 1948 Tour de France. After the twelfth stage, the margin reached it maximum at 21:28, but after that it quickly went down.

As the Italian team had not entered the Tours de France of 1939 and 1947, it was the first Tour de France for Bartali since his victory ten years before in 1938. His results in the Giro d'Italia had not been well, and it was not thought that Bartali could compete for the win.

Bartali however won the sprint in the first stage, and thanks to the bonification of one minute for the winner, he was leading the race. After that, the Italian team took a low profile in the race. In the second stage, Bartali lost the lead already; although his teammate Vincenzo Rossello won the stage, Belgian Jan Engels took over the yellow jersey.

In the third stage, a group escaped and built up a lead of almost 14 minutes. Among that group was Louison Bobet, and as he was the best-placed cyclist in that group he became the next leader. Also in that group was Roger Lambrecht; when Lambrecht again was able to be in the first group in the fourth stage, he took the lead, becoming the fourth rider in four stages to don the yellow jersey. Lambrecht kept it in the next stage, but after Bobet won the sixth stage, Bobet took back the lead, and the yellow jersey made him confident. In the Pyrenées, Bartali won both stages in a sprint, but Bobet was near and became the hero of the French spectators.

After the ninth stage, Bobet had built up a lead of more than nine minutes. In the tenth stage, he lost time, and Belgian cyclist Roger Lambrecht reduced the margin to 29 seconds. After the eleventh stage, Bobet was still in the lead, but was having problems, and after he fainted at the finish, he wanted to give up. After a meal, massage and sleeping, he changed his mind, and won the twelfth stage.

After the twelfth stage, Bartali was 20 minutes behind. Bartali thought about quitting the tour, but was persuaded to race on. That night, Bartali received a phone call while he was in bed. Alcide De Gasperi, prime minister of Italy, from the Christian Democratic party, told him that a few days earlier Palmiro Togliatti, leader of the Italian Communist Party, had been shot, and Italy might be on the edge of a civil war.

De Gasperi asked Bartali to do his best to win a stage, because the sport news might distract people from the politics. Bartali replied that he would do better, and win the race. The next day, Bartali won stage 13 with a large margin. In the general classification, he jumped to second place, trailing by only 66 seconds.

In the fourteenth stage, Bartali and Bobet rode together over the Galibier and the Croix de Fer, but Bartali had been saving his energy, and left Bobet and every body else behind on the Col de Porte. Bartali won again, and took over the yellow jersey as leader of the general classification. Bobet was now in second place, eight minutes behind. The next stage, stage 15, was also won by Bartali.

The sixteenth stage was not won by Bartali, but because his direct competitors lost time, he increased his lead to 32 minutes. Bartali lost minutes in the time trial in stage 17, but his lead was never endangered.

With each stage win of Bartali (seven in total), the Italian excitement about the Tour de France increased, and the political tensions quieted.

== Classification leadership and minor prizes ==
The time that each cyclist required to finish each stage was recorded, and these times were added together for the general classification. If a cyclist had received a time bonus, it was subtracted from this total; all time penalties were added to this total. The cyclist with the least accumulated time was the race leader, identified by the yellow jersey.

The budget of the Tour de France in 1948 was 45 million Francs, from which one third was provided by private enterprises. In total, 7 million Francs of prizes were awarded in the 1948 Tour de France. Of these, 600.000 Francs were given to Bartali for winning the general classification.

Bartali is the only cyclist to win two Tours de France ten years apart. Of the 120 cyclists, 44 finished the race.

Points for the mountains classification were earned by reaching the mountain tops first.

There were two types of mountain tops: the hardest ones, in category A, gave 10 points to the first cyclist, the easier ones, in category B, gave 5 points to the first cyclist.

The team classification was calculated by adding the times in the general classification of the best three cyclists per team.

The Souvenir Henri Desgrange was given in honour of Tour founder Henri Desgrange in the opening few kilometres of stage 1 at the summit of the Côte de Picardie in Versailles, Paris. This prize was won by Roger Lambrecht. The Tour de France in 1948 for the first time had a special award for the best regional rider. This was won by third-placed Guy Lapébie.

Classification leadership by stage
Stage	Winner	General classification	Mountains classification (Note: No jersey was awarded to the leader of the mountains classification until a white jersey with red polka dots was introduced in 1975.)	Team classification
1	Gino Bartali	Gino Bartali	no award	Belgium
2	Vincenzo Rossello	Jan Engels	no award	Belgium B
3	Guy Lapébie	Louison Bobet	no award	France
4	Jacques Pras	Roger Lambrecht	no award	Internationals
5	Raoul Rémy	Roger Lambrecht	no award	Internationals
6	Louison Bobet	Louison Bobet	no award	Internationals
7	Gino Bartali	Louison Bobet	Bernard Gauthier	France
8	Gino Bartali	Louison Bobet	Jean Robic	France
9	Raymond Impanis	Louison Bobet	Jean Robic	France
10	Raymond Impanis	Louison Bobet	Jean Robic	Internationals
11	Gino Sciardis	Louison Bobet	Jean Robic	Internationals
12	Louison Bobet	Louison Bobet	Apo Lazaridès	France
13	Gino Bartali	Louison Bobet	Jean Robic	France
14	Gino Bartali	Gino Bartali	Gino Bartali	France
15	Gino Bartali	Gino Bartali	Gino Bartali	France
16	Edward Van Dijck	Gino Bartali	Gino Bartali	France
17	Roger Lambrecht	Gino Bartali	Gino Bartali	Belgium
18	Giovanni Corrieri	Gino Bartali	Gino Bartali	Belgium
19	Gino Bartali	Gino Bartali	Gino Bartali	Belgium
20	Bernard Gauthier	Gino Bartali	Gino Bartali	Belgium
21	Giovanni Corrieri	Gino Bartali	Gino Bartali	Belgium
Final		Gino Bartali	Gino Bartali	Belgium

== Final standings ==
=== General classification ===
Final general classification (1–10)
Rank	Rider	Team	Time
1	Gino Bartali (ITA)	Italy	147h 10' 36"
2	Briek Schotte (BEL)	Belgium	+ 26' 16"
3	Guy Lapébie (FRA)	Centre/South-West	+ 28' 48"
4	Louison Bobet (FRA)	France	+ 32' 59"
5	Jeng Kirchen (LUX)	Netherlands/Luxembourg	+ 37' 53"
6	Lucien Teisseire (FRA)	France	+ 40' 17"
7	Roger Lambrecht (BEL)	Internationals	+ 49' 56"
8	Fermo Camellini (ITA)	Internationals	+ 51' 36"
9	Louis Thiétard (FRA)	Paris	+ 55' 23"
10	Raymond Impanis (BEL)	Belgium	+ 1h 00' 03"

Final general classification (11–44)
Rank	Rider	Team	Time
11	Stan Ockers (BEL)	Belgium	+ 1h 00' 13"
12	André Brulé (FRA)	Paris	+ 1h 02' 30"
13	Kléber Piot (FRA)	Paris	+ 1h 25' 08"
14	Edward Van Dijck (BEL)	Belgium	+ 1h 32' 13"
15	Raphaël Géminiani (FRA)	Centre/South-West	+ 1h 39' 49"
16	Jean Robic (FRA)	France	+ 1h 41' 26"
17	René Vietto (FRA)	France	+ 1h 42' 48"
18	Édouard Klabinski (POL)	Internationals	+ 1h 45' 30"
19	Bruno Pasquini (ITA)	Italy	+ 1h 48' 50"
20	Marcel Dupont (BEL)	Belgium Aiglons	+ 1h 59' 47"
21	Apo Lazaridès (FRA)	France	+ 2h 01' 58"
22	Jan Engels (BEL)	Belgium Aiglons	+ 2h 15' 41"
23	Raoul Rémy (FRA)	South-East	+ 2h 15' 59"
24	Bernard Gauthier (FRA)	South-East	+ 2h 34' 19"
25	Paul Giguet (FRA)	France	+ 2h 38' 01"
26	Georges Ramoulux (FRA)	Centre/South-West	+ 2h 42' 46"
27	Primo Volpi (ITA)	Italy	+ 2h 46' 48"
28	Robert Chapatte (FRA)	Paris	+ 2h 56' 31"
29	Giovanni Corrieri (ITA)	Italy	+ 2h 59' 10"
30	Florent Mathieu (BEL)	Belgium	+ 3h 00' 54"
31	Attilio Lambertini (ITA)	Italy Cadets	+ 3h 02' 55"
32	Alphonse Devreese (FRA)	Île-de-France/North-East	+ 3h 05' 28"
33	Antonio Bevilacqua (ITA)	Italy	+ 3h 05' 56"
34	Serafino Biagioni (ITA)	Italy	+ 3h 07' 03"
35	Pierre Baratin (FRA)	Île-de-France/North-East	+ 3h 18' 44"
36	Jefke Janssen (NED)	Netherlands/Luxembourg	+ 3h 24' 59"
37	Paul Néri (ITA)	Internationals	+ 3h 26' 21"
38	Vittorio Magni (ITA)	Italy Cadets	+ 3h 34' 29"
39	Georges Martin (FRA)	South-East	+ 3h 45' 13"
40	Daniel Thuayre (FRA)	Île-de-France/North-East	+ 3h 48' 13"
41	Egidio Feruglio (ITA)	Italy	+ 3h 48' 30"
42	Wim De Ruyter (NED)	Netherlands/Luxembourg	+ 3h 50' 41"
43	Jean Rey (FRA)	South-East	+ 4h 14' 57"
44	Vittorio Seghezzi (ITA)	Italy Cadets	+ 4h 26' 43"

=== Mountains classification ===
Final mountains classification (1–5)
Rank	Rider	Team	Points
1	Gino Bartali (ITA)	Italy	62
2	Apo Lazaridès (FRA)	France	43
3	Jean Robic (FRA)	France	38
4	André Brulé (FRA)	Paris	30
5	Lucien Teisseire (FRA)	France	28
6	Louison Bobet (FRA)	France	26
7	Briek Schotte (BEL)	Belgium	20
8	Raphaël Géminiani (FRA)	Centre/South-West	17
9	Roger Lambrecht (BEL)	Internationals	16
10	Fermo Camellini (ITA)	Internationals	15
10	Stan Ockers (BEL)	Belgium	15

=== Team classification ===
Final team classification (1–5)
Rank	Team	Time
1	Belgium	443h 58' 20"
2	France	+ 28' 16"
3	Paris	+ 56' 29"
4	Internationals	+ 1h 00' 30"
5	Italy	+ 2h 11' 36"

== Aftermath ==
The 1948 Tour de France first showed the strengths of Louison Bobet. Bobet would be the first rider to win three consecutive Tours de France, from 1953 to 1955. After the race, the Italian team manager Alfredo Binda said about Bobet: "If I had directed Bobet, he would have won the Tour."

Coppi, who had not competed in the 1948 Tour de France because of his bad relationship with Bartali, would enter and win the 1949 Tour de France.

== Bibliography ==
- Amels, Wim (1984). De Geschiedenis van de Tour de France 1903-1984 (in Dutch). Sport-Express. p. 56. ISBN 90-70763-05-2.
- Augendre, Jacques (2016). Guide historique [Historical guide] (PDF) (in French). Paris: Amaury Sport Organisation. Archived (PDF) from the original on 17 August 2016.
- Dauncey, Hugh; Hare, Geoff (2003). The Tour de France, 1903-2003: A century of sporting structures, meanings, and values. Routledge. ISBN 0-7146-5362-4.
- Ligget, Phil; Raia, James; Lewis, Sammarye (2005). Tour de France for dummies. For Dummies. p. 175. ISBN 0-7645-8449-9.
- Maso, Benjo (2003). Wij waren allemaal goden (in Dutch). AmstelSport. ISBN 978-90-482-0003-0.
- McGann, Bill; McGann, Carol (2006). The Story of the Tour de France: 1903–1964. Vol. 1. Indianapolis: Dog Ear Publishing. ISBN 978-1-59858-180-5.
- Nauright, John; Parrish, Charles (2012). Sports Around the World: History, Culture, and Practice. Vol. 2. Santa Barbara, California: ABC-CLIO. ISBN 978-1-59884-300-2.
- Thompson, Christopher S. (2006). The Tour de France: A Cultural History. University of California Press. ISBN 0-520-24760-4.
