= Roger Lambrecht (cyclist) =

Belgian cyclist (1916–1979)

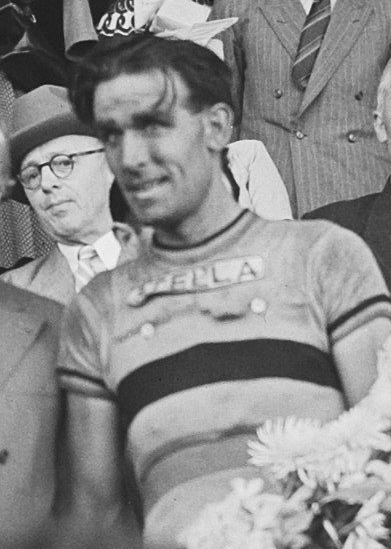
- Lambrecht at the 1949 Tour de France

Personal information
- Born: 1 January 1916 Sint-Joris, Belgium
- Died: 4 August 1979 (aged 63) Saint Pol de Leon, France

Cycling career
- Sport: Cycling
- Current team: Retired
- Discipline: Road
- Role: Rider

Professional teams
- 1945–1946: Garin-Hutchinson
- 1947: Garin-Wolber
- 1948: Stucchi
- 1948–1950: Stella-Dunlop
- 1951: Terrot-Wolber
- 1951: Arliguie-Hutchinson
- 1953: Royal-Fabric
- 1954: Royal-Condrix

Major wins
- Tour de France: two stage wins

Roger Lambrecht (1 January 1916 – 4 August 1979) was a Belgian road bicycle racer. He rode professionally from 1945 to 1954 and won 18 races, which included two stages of the 1948 and 1949 Tour de France; he wore the yellow jersey for two stages in 1948 and one stage in 1949.

== Major results ==
1946
Callac
Circuit de l'Aulne/GP Le Télégramme à Châteaulin
1948
Dijon – Lyon
Hautmont
Plonéour-Lavern
Redon
Sint-Niklaas
Tour de France:

7th place overall classification
Winner stage 17

1949
Winner stage 2 Critérium du Dauphiné Libéré
Redon
Sint-Niklaas
Tour de France:

11th place overall classification
Winner stage 2
Wearing yellow jersey for one day

1950
Tour de France:

13th place overall classification

1952
Rouen
Saint-Pol-de-Leon – Brest
