= 1949 Tour de France, Stage 1 to Stage 11 =

Cycling race stages

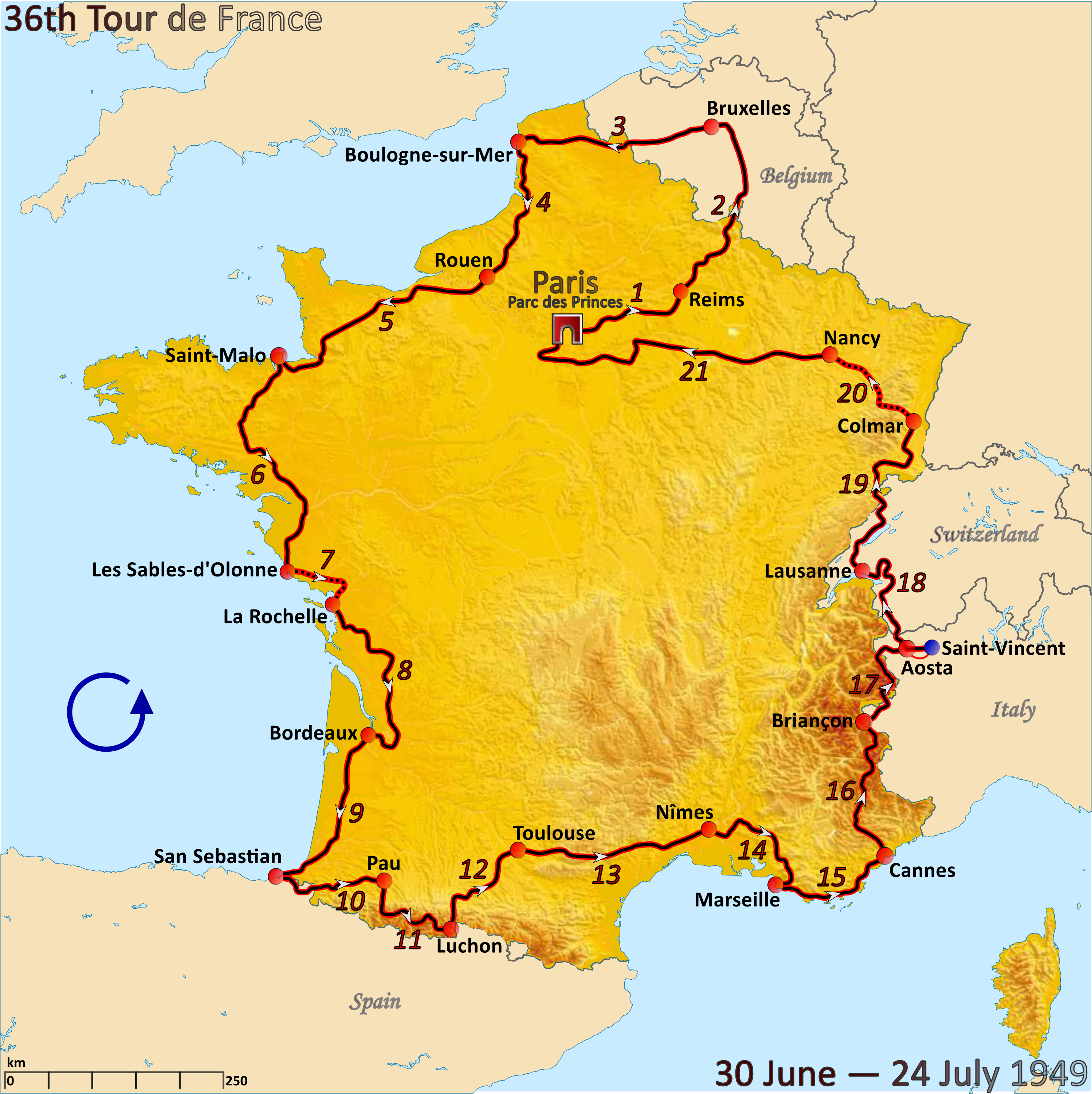
Route of the 1949 Tour de France

The 1949 Tour de France was the 36th edition of Tour de France, one of cycling's Grand Tours. The Tour began in Paris with a flat stage on 30 June and Stage 11 occurred on 12 July with a mountainous stage to Luchon. The race finished in Paris on 24 July.

== Stage 1 ==
30 June 1949 - Paris to Reims, 182 km (113.1 mi)

Stage 1 result

Rank	Rider	Team	Time
1	Marcel Dussault (FRA)	France - Centre/South-West	5h 13' 59"
2	Léon Jomaux (BEL)	Belgium	+ 25"
3	Eloi Tassin (FRA)	France - West/North	s.t.
4	Pierre Molinéris (FRA)	France - South-East	s.t.
5	Roger Lambrecht (BEL)	Belgium	s.t.
6	Jean Robic (FRA)	France - West/North	+ 1' 12"
7	Jacques Marinelli (FRA)	France - Île-de-France	s.t.
8	Rik Van Steenbergen (BEL)	Belgium	+ 1' 25"
9	Albert Dolhats (FRA)	France - Centre/South-West	+ 1' 49"
10	Louis Caput (FRA)	France - Île-de-France	s.t.

General classification after stage 1

Rank	Rider	Team	Time
1	Marcel Dussault (FRA)	France - Centre/South-West	5h 12' 59"
2	Léon Jomaux (BEL)	Belgium	+ 55"
3	Eloi Tassin (FRA)	France - West/North	+ 1' 25"
4	Pierre Molinéris (FRA)	France - South-East	s.t.
5	Roger Lambrecht (BEL)	Belgium	s.t.
6	Jean Robic (FRA)	France - West/North	+ 2' 12"
7	Jacques Marinelli (FRA)	France - Île-de-France	s.t.
8	Rik Van Steenbergen (BEL)	Belgium	+ 2' 25"
9	Albert Dolhats (FRA)	France - Centre/South-West	+ 2' 49"
10	Louis Caput (FRA)	France - Île-de-France	s.t.

== Stage 2 ==
1 July 1949 - Reims to Brussels, 273 km (169.6 mi)

Stage 2 result

Rank	Rider	Team	Time
1	Roger Lambrecht (BEL)	Belgium	8h 37' 58"
2	Jacques Marinelli (FRA)	France - Île-de-France	s.t.
3	Lucien Teisseire (FRA)	France	+ 1' 16"
4	Marcel Kint (BEL)	Belgium	+ 1' 19"
5	Mario Ricci (ITA)	Italy	s.t.
6	Stan Ockers (BEL)	Belgium	+ 1' 33"
7	Léon Jomaux (BEL)	Belgium	+ 2' 42"
8	Eloi Tassin (FRA)	France - West/North	+ 2' 45"
9	Ferdinand Kübler (SUI)	Switzerland	+ 3' 17"
10	Gino Bartali (ITA)	Italy	s.t.

General classification after stage 2

Rank	Rider	Team	Time
1	Roger Lambrecht (BEL)	Belgium	13h 51' 22"
2	Jacques Marinelli (FRA)	France - Île-de-France	+ 1' 17"
3	Léon Jomaux (BEL)	Belgium	+ 3' 12"
4	Lucien Teisseire (FRA)	France	+ 3' 40"
5	Marcel Dussault (FRA)	France - Centre/South-West	s.t.
6	Mario Ricci (ITA)	Italy	+ 3' 43"
7	Eloi Tassin (FRA)	France - West/North	+ 3' 45"
8	Stan Ockers (BEL)	Belgium	+ 3' 57"
9	Jean Robic (FRA)	France - West/North	+ 5' 04"
10	Pierre Molinéris (FRA)	France - South-East	+ 5' 05"

== Stage 3 ==
2 July 1949 - Brussels to Boulogne-sur-Mer, 211 km (131 mi)

Stage 3 result

Rank	Rider	Team	Time
1	Norbert Callens (BEL)	Belgium	6h 05' 50"
2	César Marcelak (FRA)	France - West/North	s.t.
3	Florent Mathieu (BEL)	Belgium	s.t.
4	Rik Van Steenbergen (BEL)	Belgium	+ 3' 23"
5	Raphaël Géminiani (FRA)	France	s.t.
6	Ferdinand Kübler (SUI)	Switzerland	+ 5' 20"
7	Alfredo Martini (ITA)	Italy Cadets	s.t.
8	Stan Ockers (BEL)	Belgium	s.t.
9	Louis Déprez (FRA)	France	+ 5' 51"
10	Marcel Dupont (BEL)	Belgium Aiglons	s.t.

General classification after stage 3

Rank	Rider	Team	Time
1	Norbert Callens (BEL)	Belgium	20h 02' 41"
2	Roger Lambrecht (BEL)	Belgium	+ 1' 41"
3	Jacques Marinelli (FRA)	France - Île-de-France	+ 2' 58"
4	Stan Ockers (BEL)	Belgium	+ 3' 48"
5	Rik Van Steenbergen (BEL)	Belgium	+ 4' 14"
6	Léon Jomaux (BEL)	Belgium	+ 4' 53"
7	Marcel Dussault (FRA)	France - Centre/South-West	+ 5' 21"
8	Lucien Teisseire (FRA)	France	s.t.
9	Mario Ricci (ITA)	Italy	+ 5' 24"
10	Ferdinand Kübler (SUI)	Switzerland	+ 5' 32"

== Stage 4 ==
3 July 1949 - Boulogne-sur-Mer to Rouen, 185 km (115 mi)

Stage 4 result

Rank	Rider	Team	Time
1	Lucien Teisseire (FRA)	France	5h 10' 04"
2	Jacques Marinelli (FRA)	France - Île-de-France	s.t.
3	Maurice Diot (FRA)	France	+ 1' 42"
4	Mario Ricci (ITA)	Italy	+ 3' 46"
5	Édouard Muller (FRA)	France - Île-de-France	s.t.
6	Émile Idée (FRA)	France - Île-de-France	s.t.
7	Attilio Redolfi (FRA)	France - Île-de-France	s.t.
8	Robert Chapatte (FRA)	France	s.t.
9	Édouard Fachleitner (FRA)	France - South-East	s.t.
10	Robert Desbats (FRA)	France - Centre/South-West	s.t.

General classification after stage 4

Rank	Rider	Team	Time
1	Jacques Marinelli (FRA)	France - Île-de-France	25h 15' 43"
2	Lucien Teisseire (FRA)	France	+ 1' 53"
3	Mario Ricci (ITA)	Italy	+ 6' 42"
4	Roger Lambrecht (BEL)	Belgium	+ 8' 50"
5	Maurice Diot (FRA)	France	+ 8' 57"
6	Émile Idée (FRA)	France - Île-de-France	+ 9' 28"
7	Robert Chapatte (FRA)	France	s.t.
8	Fiorenzo Magni (ITA)	Italy Cadets	s.t.
9	Norbert Callens (BEL)	Belgium	+ 10' 30"
10	Guy Lapébie (FRA)	France	+ 10' 39"

== Stage 5 ==
4 July 1949 - Rouen to Saint-Malo, 293 km (182 mi)

Stage 5 result

Rank	Rider	Team	Time
1	Ferdinand Kübler (SUI)	Switzerland	8h 27' 13"
2	Bernard Gauthier (FRA)	France	s.t.
3	Pierre Tacca (FRA)	France - Île-de-France	s.t.
4	Jacques Marinelli (FRA)	France - Île-de-France	s.t.
5	Marcel Dupont (BEL)	Belgium Aiglons	s.t.
6	Jean Robic (FRA)	France - West/North	+ 5' 30"
7	Louis Caput (FRA)	France - Île-de-France	s.t.
8	Stan Ockers (BEL)	Belgium	s.t.
9	Gino Bartali (ITA)	Italy	s.t.
10	Gino Sciardis (ITA)	Italy	s.t.

General classification after stage 5

Rank	Rider	Team	Time
1	Jacques Marinelli (FRA)	France - Île-de-France	33h 42' 26"
2	Fiorenzo Magni (ITA)	Italy Cadets	+ 14' 58"
3	Ferdinand Kübler (SUI)	Switzerland	+ 15' 02"
4	Marcel Dupont (BEL)	Belgium Aiglons	+ 16' 33"
5	Pierre Tacca (FRA)	France - Île-de-France	+ 18' 40"
6	Maurice Diot (FRA)	France	+ 19' 39"
7	Stan Ockers (BEL)	Belgium	+ 19' 48"
8	Lucien Teisseire (FRA)	France	+ 20' 36"
9	Gino Bartali (ITA)	Italy	+ 23' 22"
10	Pierre Cogan (FRA)	France - West/North	+ 23' 42"

== Stage 6 ==
5 July 1949 - Saint-Malo to Les Sables-d'Olonne, 305 km (190 mi)

Stage 6 result

Rank	Rider	Team	Time
1	Adolphe Deledda (FRA)	France - South-East	8h 39' 07"
2	Stan Ockers (BEL)	Belgium	+ 13"
3	Ferdinand Kübler (SUI)	Switzerland	+ 25"
4	Gino Bartali (ITA)	Italy	s.t.
5	Jean Robic (FRA)	France - West/North	s.t.
6	Gino Sciardis (ITA)	Italy	s.t.
7	Roger-Jean Le Nizerhy (FRA)	France - West/North	s.t.
8	Rik Van Steenbergen (BEL)	Belgium	s.t.
9	Marcel Kint (BEL)	Belgium	s.t.
10	Marcel Hendrickx (BEL)	Belgium Aiglons	s.t.

General classification after stage 6

Rank	Rider	Team	Time
1	Jacques Marinelli (FRA)	France - Île-de-France	42h 21' 58"
2	Fiorenzo Magni (ITA)	Italy Cadets	+ 14' 58"
3	Ferdinand Kübler (SUI)	Switzerland	+ 15' 02"
4	Marcel Dupont (BEL)	Belgium Aiglons	+ 16' 33"
5	Pierre Tacca (FRA)	France - Île-de-France	+ 18' 40"
6	Stan Ockers (BEL)	Belgium	+ 19' 06"
7	Lucien Teisseire (FRA)	France	+ 20' 36"
8	Gino Bartali (ITA)	Italy	+ 23' 22"
9	Pierre Cogan (FRA)	France - West/North	+ 23' 42"
10	Fermo Camellini (FRA)	France - South-East	s.t.

== Rest Day 1 ==
6 July 1949 - Les Sables-d'Olonne

== Stage 7 ==
7 July 1949 - Les Sables-d'Olonne to La Rochelle, 92 km (57 mi)(ITT)

Stage 7 result

Rank	Rider	Team	Time
1	Fausto Coppi (ITA)	Italy	2h 18' 10"
2	Ferdinand Kübler (SUI)	Switzerland	+ 1' 32"
3	Rik Van Steenbergen (BEL)	Belgium	+ 2' 47"
4	Guido De Santi (ITA)	Italy	+ 3' 18"
5	Bruno Pasquini (ITA)	Italy	+ 3' 49"
6	Gino Bartali (ITA)	Italy	+ 4' 31"
7	Giuseppe Ausenda (ITA)	Italy Cadets	+ 4' 50"
8	Giovanni Corrieri (ITA)	Italy	+ 4' 55"
9	Marcel Dussault (FRA)	France - Centre/South-West	+ 5' 14"
10	Nello Lauredi (FRA)	France - South-East	+ 5' 40"

General classification after stage 7

Rank	Rider	Team	Time
1	Jacques Marinelli (FRA)	France - Île-de-France	44h 47' 40"
2	Ferdinand Kübler (SUI)	Switzerland	+ 8' 32"
3	Fiorenzo Magni (ITA)	Italy Cadets	+ 17' 27"
4	Marcel Dupont (BEL)	Belgium Aiglons	+ 17' 36"
5	Pierre Tacca (FRA)	France - Île-de-France	+ 17' 50"
6	Stan Ockers (BEL)	Belgium	+ 19' 30"
7	Gino Bartali (ITA)	Italy	+ 20' 21"
8	Pierre Cogan (FRA)	France - West/North	+ 23' 06"
9	Fermo Camellini (FRA)	France - South-East	+ 23' 52"
10	Lucien Teisseire (FRA)	France	+ 26' 25"

== Stage 8 ==
8 July 1949 - La Rochelle to Bordeaux, 262 km (163 mi)

Stage 8 result

Rank	Rider	Team	Time
1	Guy Lapébie (FRA)	France	7h 27' 22"
2	Rik Van Steenbergen (BEL)	Belgium	s.t.
3	Pierre Tacca (FRA)	France - Île-de-France	s.t.
4	Maurice Diot (FRA)	France	s.t.
5	Robert Desbats (FRA)	France - Centre/South-West	s.t.
6	Louis Caput (FRA)	France - Île-de-France	s.t.
7	Raymond Impanis (BEL)	Belgium	s.t.
8	Armando Peverelli (ITA)	Italy Cadets	s.t.
9	Jean Blanc (FRA)	France - Centre/South-West	s.t.
10	Luciano Pezzi (ITA)	Italy	+ 1' 31"

General classification after stage 8

Rank	Rider	Team	Time
1	Jacques Marinelli (FRA)	France - Île-de-France	52h 17' 08"
2	Ferdinand Kübler (SUI)	Switzerland	+ 8' 32"
3	Pierre Tacca (FRA)	France - Île-de-France	+ 15' 44"
4	Fiorenzo Magni (ITA)	Italy Cadets	+ 17' 27"
5	Marcel Dupont (BEL)	Belgium Aiglons	+ 17' 36"
6	Stan Ockers (BEL)	Belgium	+ 19' 30"
7	Gino Bartali (ITA)	Italy	+ 20' 21"
8	Pierre Cogan (FRA)	France - West/North	+ 23' 06"
9	Fermo Camellini (FRA)	France - South-East	+ 23' 52"
10	Guy Lapébie (FRA)	France	+ 25' 34"

== Stage 9 ==
9 July 1949 - Bordeaux to San Sebastián, 228 km (142 mi)

Stage 9 result

Rank	Rider	Team	Time
1	Louis Caput (FRA)	France - Île-de-France	6h 30' 49"
2	Stan Ockers (BEL)	Belgium	s.t.
3	Luciano Pezzi (ITA)	Italy	s.t.
4	Marcel De Mulder (BEL)	Belgium Aiglons	s.t.
5	Marcel Dupont (BEL)	Belgium Aiglons	s.t.
6	Gino Sciardis (ITA)	Italy	+ 1' 31"
7	Robert Chapatte (FRA)	France	s.t.
8	Roger Lévêque (FRA)	France - Centre/South-West	s.t.
9	Bim Diederich (LUX)	Luxembourg	s.t.
10	Pierre Cogan (FRA)	France - West/North	s.t.

General classification after stage 9

Rank	Rider	Team	Time
1	Jacques Marinelli (FRA)	France - Île-de-France	58h 51' 48"
2	Ferdinand Kübler (SUI)	Switzerland	+ 8' 32"
3	Marcel Dupont (BEL)	Belgium Aiglons	+ 13' 45"
4	Stan Ockers (BEL)	Belgium	+ 15' 09"
5	Pierre Tacca (FRA)	France - Île-de-France	+ 15' 44"
6	Fiorenzo Magni (ITA)	Italy Cadets	+ 17' 27"
7	Gino Bartali (ITA)	Italy	+ 20' 21"
8	Pierre Cogan (FRA)	France - West/North	+ 20' 46"
9	Louis Caput (FRA)	France - Île-de-France	+ 21' 01"
10	Fermo Camellini (FRA)	France - South-East	+ 23' 52"

== Stage 10 ==
10 July 1949 - San Sebastián to Pau, 192 km (119 mi)

Stage 10 result

Rank	Rider	Team	Time
1	Fiorenzo Magni (ITA)	Italy Cadets	5h 53' 04"
2	Raymond Impanis (BEL)	Belgium	s.t.
3	Serafino Biagioni (ITA)	Italy	s.t.
4	Édouard Fachleitner (FRA)	France - South-East	s.t.
5	Raphaël Géminiani (FRA)	France	+ 18' 13"
6	Ferdinand Kübler (SUI)	Switzerland	+ 20' 36"
7	Gino Sciardis (ITA)	Italy	s.t.
8	Rik Van Steenbergen (BEL)	Belgium	s.t.
9	Stan Ockers (BEL)	Belgium	s.t.
10	Marcel Kint (BEL)	Belgium	s.t.

General classification after stage 10

Rank	Rider	Team	Time
1	Fiorenzo Magni (ITA)	Italy Cadets	65h 01' 19"
2	Jacques Marinelli (FRA)	France - Île-de-France	+ 4' 09"
3	Édouard Fachleitner (FRA)	France - South-East	+ 10' 51"
4	Ferdinand Kübler (SUI)	Switzerland	+ 12' 41"
5	Marcel Dupont (BEL)	Belgium Aiglons	+ 17' 54"
6	Raymond Impanis (BEL)	Belgium	+ 18' 46"
7	Stan Ockers (BEL)	Belgium	+ 19' 18"
8	Serafino Biagioni (ITA)	Italy	+ 19' 31"
9	Pierre Tacca (FRA)	France - Île-de-France	+ 19' 53"
10	Gino Bartali (ITA)	Italy	+ 24' 30"

== Rest Day 2 ==
11 July 1949 - Pau

== Stage 11 ==
12 July 1949 - Pau to Luchon, 193 km (120 mi)

Stage 11 result

Rank	Rider	Team	Time
1	Jean Robic (FRA)	France - West/North	7h 06' 22"
2	Lucien Lazaridès (FRA)	France	s.t.
3	Fausto Coppi (ITA)	Italy	+ 57"
4	André Brule (FRA)	France - Île-de-France	+ 3' 40"
5	Pierre Cogan (FRA)	France - West/North	+ 3' 42"
6	Gino Bartali (ITA)	Italy	+ 4' 37"
7	Apo Lazaridès (FRA)	France	+ 6' 12"
8	René Vietto (FRA)	France	+ 7' 49"
9	Édouard Fachleitner (FRA)	France - South-East	+ 7' 52"
10	Gino Sciardis (ITA)	Italy	+ 8' 40"

General classification after stage 11

Rank	Rider	Team	Time
1	Fiorenzo Magni (ITA)	Italy Cadets	72h 23' 44"
2	Édouard Fachleitner (FRA)	France - South-East	+ 2' 40"
3	Jacques Marinelli (FRA)	France - Île-de-France	+ 3' 11"
4	Ferdinand Kübler (SUI)	Switzerland	+ 11' 22"
5	Marcel Dupont (BEL)	Belgium Aiglons	+ 11' 57"
6	Stan Ockers (BEL)	Belgium	+ 11' 59"
7	Pierre Cogan (FRA)	France - West/North	+ 12' 34"
8	Gino Bartali (ITA)	Italy	+ 13' 04"
9	Fausto Coppi (ITA)	Italy	+ 14' 46"
10	Jean Robic (FRA)	France - West/North	+ 14' 54"
