= 1949 Tour de France, Stage 12 to Stage 21 =

Cycling race stages

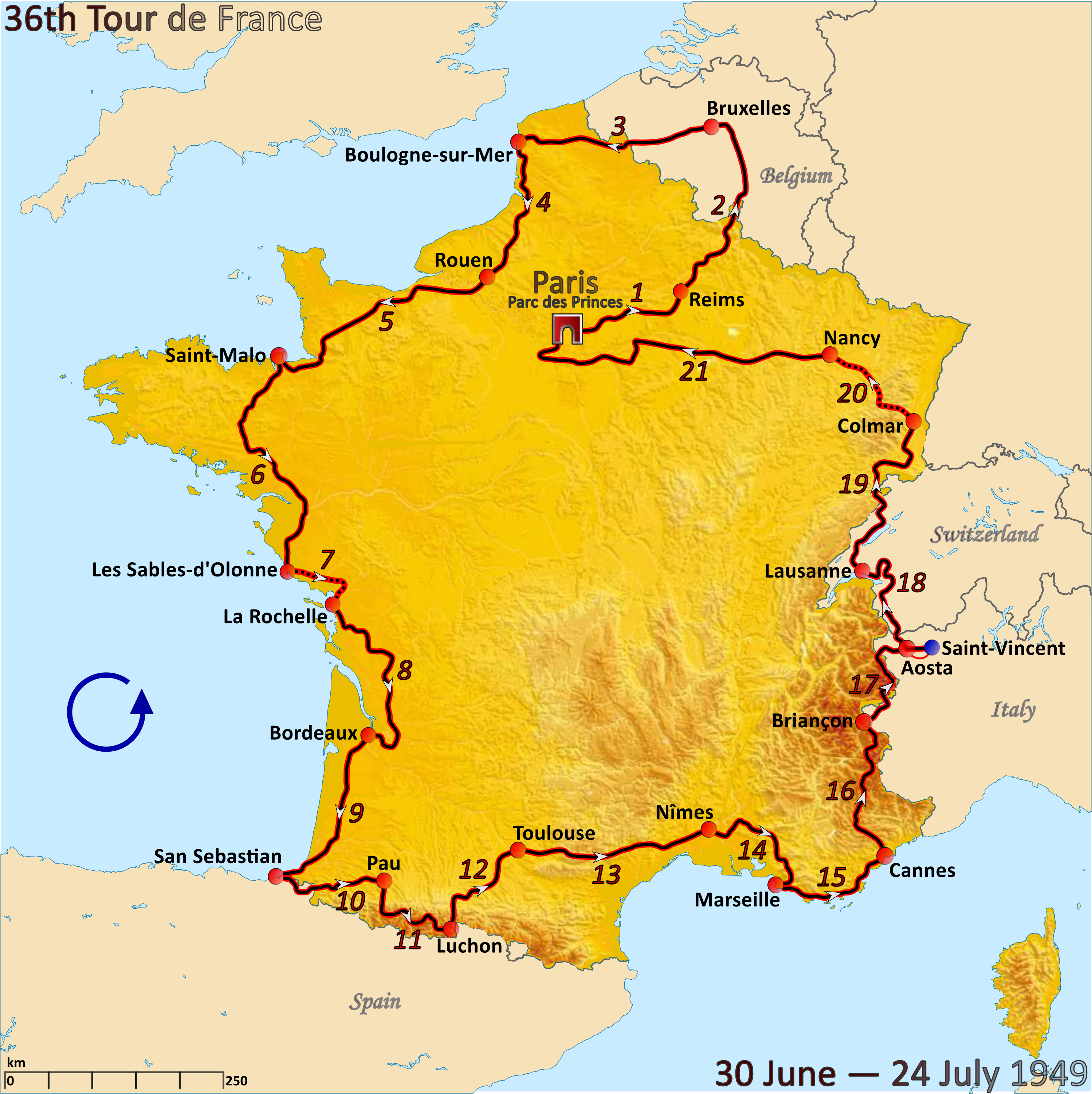
Route of the 1949 Tour de France

The 1949 Tour de France was the 36th edition of Tour de France, one of cycling's Grand Tours. The Tour began in Paris with a flat stage on 30 June and Stage 12 occurred on 13 July with a stage from Luchon. The race finished in Paris on 24 July.

== Stage 12 ==
13 July 1949 - Luchon to Toulouse, 134 km (83.3 mi)

Stage 12 result

| Rank | Rider | Team | Time |
|---|---|---|---|
| 1 | Rik Van Steenbergen (BEL) | Belgium | 3h 32' 11" |
| 2 | Marcel Kint (BEL) | Belgium | s.t. |
| 3 | Roger-Jean Le Nizerhy (FRA) | France - West/North | s.t. |
| 4 | Ferdinand Kübler (SUI) | Switzerland | s.t. |
| 5 | Marcel Hendrickx (BEL) | Belgium Aiglons | s.t. |
| 6 | Alfredo Martini (ITA) | Italy Cadets | s.t. |
| 7 | Custodio Dos Reis (FRA) | France - Centre/South-West | s.t. |
| 8 | Georges Ramoulux (FRA) | France - Centre/South-West | s.t. |
| 9 | Stan Ockers (BEL) | Belgium | s.t. |
| 10 | Raphaël Géminiani (FRA) | France | s.t. |

General classification after stage 12

| Rank | Rider | Team | Time |
|---|---|---|---|
| 1 | Fiorenzo Magni (ITA) | Italy Cadets | 75h 57' 03" |
| 2 | Édouard Fachleitner (FRA) | France - South-East | + 2' 10" |
| 3 | Jacques Marinelli (FRA) | France - Île-de-France | + 2' 41" |
| 4 | Ferdinand Kübler (SUI) | Switzerland | + 10' 14" |
| 5 | Stan Ockers (BEL) | Belgium | + 10' 51" |
| 6 | Marcel Dupont (BEL) | Belgium Aiglons | + 11' 27" |
| 7 | Pierre Cogan (FRA) | France - West/North | + 12' 04" |
| 8 | Gino Bartali (ITA) | Italy | + 12' 34" |
| 9 | Fausto Coppi (ITA) | Italy | + 14' 16" |
| 10 | Jean Robic (FRA) | France - West/North | + 14' 24" |

== Stage 13 ==
14 July 1949 - Toulouse to Nîmes, 289 km (180 mi)

Stage 13 result

| Rank | Rider | Team | Time |
|---|---|---|---|
| 1 | Émile Idée (FRA) | France - Île-de-France | 8h 29' 04" |
| 2 | Roger Lambrecht (BEL) | Belgium | s.t. |
| 3 | Marcel Dupont (BEL) | Belgium Aiglons | s.t. |
| 4 | Giuseppe Ausenda (ITA) | Italy Cadets | s.t. |
| 5 | Lucien Teisseire (FRA) | France | s.t. |
| 6 | Édouard Muller (FRA) | France - Île-de-France | + 1' 44" |
| 7 | Bim Diederich (LUX) | Luxembourg | + 4' 16" |
| 8 | Ferdinand Kübler (SUI) | Switzerland | s.t. |
| 9 | Rik Van Steenbergen (BEL) | Belgium | s.t. |
| 10 | Stan Ockers (BEL) | Belgium | s.t. |

General classification after stage 13

| Rank | Rider | Team | Time |
|---|---|---|---|
| 1 | Fiorenzo Magni (ITA) | Italy Cadets | 84h 30' 23" |
| 2 | Édouard Fachleitner (FRA) | France - South-East | + 2' 10" |
| 3 | Jacques Marinelli (FRA) | France - Île-de-France | + 2' 41" |
| 4 | Marcel Dupont (BEL) | Belgium Aiglons | + 7' 11" |
| 5 | Ferdinand Kübler (SUI) | Switzerland | + 10' 14" |
| 6 | Stan Ockers (BEL) | Belgium | + 11' 29" |
| 7 | Pierre Cogan (FRA) | France - West/North | + 12' 04" |
| 8 | Gino Bartali (ITA) | Italy | + 12' 34" |
| 9 | Fausto Coppi (ITA) | Italy | + 14' 16" |
| 10 | Jean Robic (FRA) | France - West/North | + 14' 24" |

== Stage 14 ==
15 July 1949 - Nîmes to Marseille, 199 km (124 mi)

Stage 14 result

| Rank | Rider | Team | Time |
|---|---|---|---|
| 1 | Jean Goldschmit (LUX) | Luxembourg | 6h 17' 08" |
| 2 | Jean Blanc (FRA) | France - Centre/South-West | + 1' 51" |
| 3 | Jean Robic (FRA) | France - West/North | + 2' 40" |
| 4 | Gino Sciardis (ITA) | Italy | s.t. |
| 5 | Stan Ockers (BEL) | Belgium | s.t. |
| 6 | Marcel Hendrickx (BEL) | Belgium Aiglons | s.t. |
| 7 | Albert Dolhats (FRA) | France - Centre/South-West | s.t. |
| 8 | Marcel Kint (BEL) | Belgium | s.t. |
| 9 | Ferdinand Kübler (SUI) | Switzerland | s.t. |
| 10 | Armando Peverelli (ITA) | Italy Cadets | s.t. |

General classification after stage 14

| Rank | Rider | Team | Time |
|---|---|---|---|
| 1 | Fiorenzo Magni (ITA) | Italy Cadets | 90h 50' 11" |
| 2 | Édouard Fachleitner (FRA) | France - South-East | + 2' 10" |
| 3 | Jacques Marinelli (FRA) | France - Île-de-France | + 2' 41" |
| 4 | Marcel Dupont (BEL) | Belgium Aiglons | + 7' 11" |
| 5 | Ferdinand Kübler (SUI) | Switzerland | + 10' 14" |
| 6 | Stan Ockers (BEL) | Belgium | + 11' 29" |
| 7 | Pierre Cogan (FRA) | France - West/North | + 12' 04" |
| 8 | Gino Bartali (ITA) | Italy | + 12' 34" |
| 9 | Fausto Coppi (ITA) | Italy | + 14' 16" |
| 10 | Jean Robic (FRA) | France - West/North | + 14' 24" |

== Stage 15 ==
16 July 1949 - Marseille to Cannes, 215 km (134 mi)

Stage 15 result

| Rank | Rider | Team | Time |
|---|---|---|---|
| 1 | Désiré Keteleer (BEL) | Belgium | 6h 02' 29" |
| 2 | Émile Idée (FRA) | France - Île-de-France | s.t. |
| 3 | Guido De Santi (ITA) | Italy | s.t. |
| 4 | Paul Giguet (FRA) | France - South-East | s.t. |
| 5 | Bim Diederich (LUX) | Luxembourg | s.t. |
| 6 | Fermo Camellini (FRA) | France - South-East | s.t. |
| 7 | Roger Lambrecht (BEL) | Belgium | s.t. |
| 8 | Apo Lazaridès (FRA) | France | + 2" |
| 9 | Florent Mathieu (BEL) | Belgium | + 12' 29" |
| 10 | Giovanni Corrieri (ITA) | Italy | s.t. |

General classification after stage 15

| Rank | Rider | Team | Time |
|---|---|---|---|
| 1 | Fiorenzo Magni (ITA) | Italy Cadets | 97h 05' 09" |
| 2 | Édouard Fachleitner (FRA) | France - South-East | + 2' 10" |
| 3 | Jacques Marinelli (FRA) | France - Île-de-France | + 2' 41" |
| 4 | Marcel Dupont (BEL) | Belgium Aiglons | + 7' 11" |
| 5 | Roger Lambrecht (BEL) | Belgium | + 9' 28" |
| 6 | Ferdinand Kübler (SUI) | Switzerland | + 10' 14" |
| 7 | Stan Ockers (BEL) | Belgium | + 11' 29" |
| 8 | Pierre Cogan (FRA) | France - West/North | + 12' 04" |
| 9 | Gino Bartali (ITA) | Italy | + 12' 34" |
| 10 | Fausto Coppi (ITA) | Italy | + 14' 16" |

== Rest Day 3 ==
17 July 1949 - Cannes

== Stage 16 ==
18 July 1949 - Cannes to Briançon, 275 km (171 mi)

Stage 16 result

| Rank | Rider | Team | Time |
|---|---|---|---|
| 1 | Gino Bartali (ITA) | Italy | 10h 25' 35" |
| 2 | Fausto Coppi (ITA) | Italy | s.t. |
| 3 | Jean Robic (FRA) | France - West/North | + 5' 06" |
| 4 | Apo Lazaridès (FRA) | France | + 6' 28" |
| 5 | Stan Ockers (BEL) | Belgium | + 6' 44" |
| 6 | Jacques Marinelli (FRA) | France - Île-de-France | + 9' 27" |
| 7 | Raphaël Géminiani (FRA) | France | + 12' 09" |
| 8 | Fiorenzo Magni (ITA) | Italy Cadets | + 12' 12" |
| 9 | Nello Lauredi (FRA) | France - South-East | + 12' 59" |
| 10 | Robert Chapatte (FRA) | France | + 15' 13" |

General classification after stage 16

| Rank | Rider | Team | Time |
|---|---|---|---|
| 1 | Gino Bartali (ITA) | Italy | 107h 41' 28" |
| 2 | Fausto Coppi (ITA) | Italy | + 1' 22" |
| 3 | Jacques Marinelli (FRA) | France - Île-de-France | + 1' 24" |
| 4 | Fiorenzo Magni (ITA) | Italy Cadets | + 1' 28" |
| 5 | Stan Ockers (BEL) | Belgium | + 7' 29" |
| 6 | Jean Robic (FRA) | France - West/North | + 9' 26" |
| 7 | Marcel Dupont (BEL) | Belgium Aiglons | + 13' 04" |
| 8 | Ferdinand Kübler (SUI) | Switzerland | + 14' 22" |
| 9 | Édouard Fachleitner (FRA) | France - South-East | + 15' 07" |
| 10 | Apo Lazaridès (FRA) | France | + 15' 38" |

== Stage 17 ==
19 July 1949 - Briançon to Aosta, 257 km (160 mi)

Stage 17 result

| Rank | Rider | Team | Time |
|---|---|---|---|
| 1 | Fausto Coppi (ITA) | Italy | 9h 08' 48" |
| 2 | Gino Bartali (ITA) | Italy | + 4' 55" |
| 3 | Jean Robic (FRA) | France - West/North | + 10' 16" |
| 4 | Stan Ockers (BEL) | Belgium | s.t. |
| 5 | Jacques Marinelli (FRA) | France - Île-de-France | s.t. |
| 6 | Marcel De Mulder (BEL) | Belgium Aiglons | s.t. |
| 7 | Marcel Dupont (BEL) | Belgium Aiglons | s.t. |
| 8 | Georges Aeschlimann (SUI) | Switzerland | s.t. |
| 9 | Jean Goldschmit (LUX) | Luxembourg | s.t. |
| 10 | Apo Lazaridès (FRA) | France | + 14' 34" |

General classification after stage 17

| Rank | Rider | Team | Time |
|---|---|---|---|
| 1 | Fausto Coppi (ITA) | Italy | 116h 49' 48" |
| 2 | Gino Bartali (ITA) | Italy | + 3' 53" |
| 3 | Jacques Marinelli (FRA) | France - Île-de-France | + 12' 08" |
| 4 | Stan Ockers (BEL) | Belgium | + 18' 13" |
| 5 | Jean Robic (FRA) | France - West/North | + 20' 10" |
| 6 | Marcel Dupont (BEL) | Belgium Aiglons | + 23' 48" |
| 7 | Fiorenzo Magni (ITA) | Italy Cadets | + 27' 32" |
| 8 | Apo Lazaridès (FRA) | France | + 30' 40" |
| 9 | Jean Goldschmit (LUX) | Luxembourg | + 36' 24" |
| 10 | Pierre Cogan (FRA) | France - West/North | + 48' 18" |

== Rest Day 4 ==
20 July 1949 - Aosta

== Stage 18 ==
21 July 1949 - Aosta to Lausanne, 265 km (165 mi)

Stage 18 result

| Rank | Rider | Team | Time |
|---|---|---|---|
| 1 | Vincenzo Rossello (ITA) | Italy | 9h 05' 56" |
| 2 | Bruno Pasquini (ITA) | Italy | s.t. |
| 3 | Gottfried Weilenmann (SUI) | Switzerland | + 5' 07" |
| 4 | Stan Ockers (BEL) | Belgium | + 11' 21" |
| 5 | Raphaël Géminiani (FRA) | France | s.t. |
| 6 | Rik Van Steenbergen (BEL) | Belgium | s.t. |
| 7 | Briek Schotte (BEL) | Belgium | s.t. |
| 8 | Gino Sciardis (ITA) | Italy | s.t. |
| 9 | Albert Dolhats (FRA) | France - Centre/South-West | s.t. |
| 10 | Désiré Keteleer (BEL) | Belgium | s.t. |

General classification after stage 18

| Rank | Rider | Team | Time |
|---|---|---|---|
| 1 | Fausto Coppi (ITA) | Italy | 126h 06' 35" |
| 2 | Gino Bartali (ITA) | Italy | + 3' 03" |
| 3 | Jacques Marinelli (FRA) | France - Île-de-France | + 12' 38" |
| 4 | Stan Ockers (BEL) | Belgium | + 18' 43" |
| 5 | Jean Robic (FRA) | France - West/North | + 20' 00" |
| 6 | Marcel Dupont (BEL) | Belgium Aiglons | + 24' 18" |
| 7 | Fiorenzo Magni (ITA) | Italy Cadets | + 28' 02" |
| 8 | Apo Lazaridès (FRA) | France | + 31' 10" |
| 9 | Jean Goldschmit (LUX) | Luxembourg | + 37' 24" |
| 10 | Pierre Cogan (FRA) | France - West/North | + 48' 48" |

== Stage 19 ==
22 July 1949 - Lausanne to Colmar, 283 km (176 mi)

Stage 19 result

| Rank | Rider | Team | Time |
|---|---|---|---|
| 1 | Raphaël Géminiani (FRA) | France | 8h 59' 57" |
| 2 | Jean-Marie Goasmat (FRA) | France - West/North | s.t. |
| 3 | Bim Diederich (LUX) | Luxembourg | + 6' 07" |
| 4 | Giuseppe Ausenda (ITA) | Italy Cadets | s.t. |
| 5 | Marcel Hendrickx (BEL) | Belgium Aiglons | + 6' 29" |
| 6 | Jean Robic (FRA) | France - West/North | + 7' 12" |
| 7 | Gino Sciardis (ITA) | Italy | s.t. |
| 8 | Stan Ockers (BEL) | Belgium | s.t. |
| 9 | Florent Mathieu (BEL) | Belgium | s.t. |
| 10 | Roger Lambrecht (BEL) | Belgium | s.t. |

General classification after stage 19

| Rank | Rider | Team | Time |
|---|---|---|---|
| 1 | Fausto Coppi (ITA) | Italy | 135h 13' 44" |
| 2 | Gino Bartali (ITA) | Italy | + 3' 03" |
| 3 | Jacques Marinelli (FRA) | France - Île-de-France | + 12' 38" |
| 4 | Stan Ockers (BEL) | Belgium | + 18' 43" |
| 5 | Jean Robic (FRA) | France - West/North | + 20' 00" |
| 6 | Marcel Dupont (BEL) | Belgium Aiglons | + 24' 18" |
| 7 | Fiorenzo Magni (ITA) | Italy Cadets | + 28' 02" |
| 8 | Apo Lazaridès (FRA) | France | + 31' 10" |
| 9 | Jean Goldschmit (LUX) | Luxembourg | + 37' 24" |
| 10 | Pierre Cogan (FRA) | France - West/North | + 48' 48" |

== Stage 20 ==
23 July 1949 - Colmar to Nancy, 137 km (85 mi) (ITT)

Stage 20 result

| Rank | Rider | Team | Time |
|---|---|---|---|
| 1 | Fausto Coppi (ITA) | Italy | 3h 38' 50" |
| 2 | Gino Bartali (ITA) | Italy | + 7' 02" |
| 3 | Jean Goldschmit (LUX) | Luxembourg | + 8' 40" |
| 4 | Jacques Marinelli (FRA) | France - Île-de-France | + 11' 15" |
| 5 | Nello Lauredi (FRA) | France - South-East | + 11' 53" |
| 6 | Fiorenzo Magni (ITA) | Italy Cadets | + 12' 48" |
| 7 | Jean Robic (FRA) | France - West/North | + 13' 08" |
| 8 | Gino Sciardis (ITA) | Italy | + 13' 17" |
| 9 | Marcel Dupont (BEL) | Belgium Aiglons | + 13' 21" |
| 10 | Guido De Santi (ITA) | Italy | + 13' 58" |

General classification after stage 20

| Rank | Rider | Team | Time |
|---|---|---|---|
| 1 | Fausto Coppi (ITA) | Italy | 138h 51' 14" |
| 2 | Gino Bartali (ITA) | Italy | + 10' 55" |
| 3 | Jacques Marinelli (FRA) | France - Île-de-France | + 25' 13" |
| 4 | Jean Robic (FRA) | France - West/North | + 34' 28" |
| 5 | Marcel Dupont (BEL) | Belgium Aiglons | + 38' 59" |
| 6 | Fiorenzo Magni (ITA) | Italy Cadets | + 42' 10" |
| 7 | Stan Ockers (BEL) | Belgium | + 45' 05" |
| 8 | Jean Goldschmit (LUX) | Luxembourg | + 47' 24" |
| 9 | Apo Lazaridès (FRA) | France | + 52' 28" |
| 10 | Pierre Cogan (FRA) | France - West/North | + 1h 08' 55" |

== Stage 21 ==
24 July 1949 - Nancy to Paris, 340 km (210 mi)

Stage 21 result

| Rank | Rider | Team | Time |
|---|---|---|---|
| 1 | Rik Van Steenbergen (BEL) | Belgium | 10h 49' 35" |
| 2 | Stan Ockers (BEL) | Belgium | s.t. |
| 3 | Giovanni Corrieri (ITA) | Italy | s.t. |
| 4 | Jean Robic (FRA) | France - West/North | s.t. |
| 5 | Gino Bartali (ITA) | Italy | s.t. |
| 6 | Paul Giguet (FRA) | France - South-East | s.t. |
| 7 | Serafino Biagioni (ITA) | Italy | s.t. |
| 8 | Fausto Coppi (ITA) | Italy | s.t. |
| 9 | Bruno Pasquini (ITA) | Italy | s.t. |
| 10 | Luciano Pezzi (ITA) | Italy | s.t. |

General classification after stage 21

| Rank | Rider | Team | Time |
|---|---|---|---|
| 1 | Fausto Coppi (ITA) | Italy | 149h 40' 49" |
| 2 | Gino Bartali (ITA) | Italy | + 10' 55" |
| 3 | Jacques Marinelli (FRA) | France - Île-de-France | + 25' 13" |
| 4 | Jean Robic (FRA) | France - West/North | + 34' 28" |
| 5 | Marcel Dupont (BEL) | Belgium Aiglons | + 38' 59" |
| 6 | Fiorenzo Magni (ITA) | Italy Cadets | + 42' 10" |
| 7 | Stan Ockers (BEL) | Belgium | + 44' 35" |
| 8 | Jean Goldschmit (LUX) | Luxembourg | + 47' 24" |
| 9 | Apo Lazaridès (FRA) | France | + 52' 28" |
| 10 | Pierre Cogan (FRA) | France - West/North | + 1h 08' 55" |
