= 1949 Tour de France =

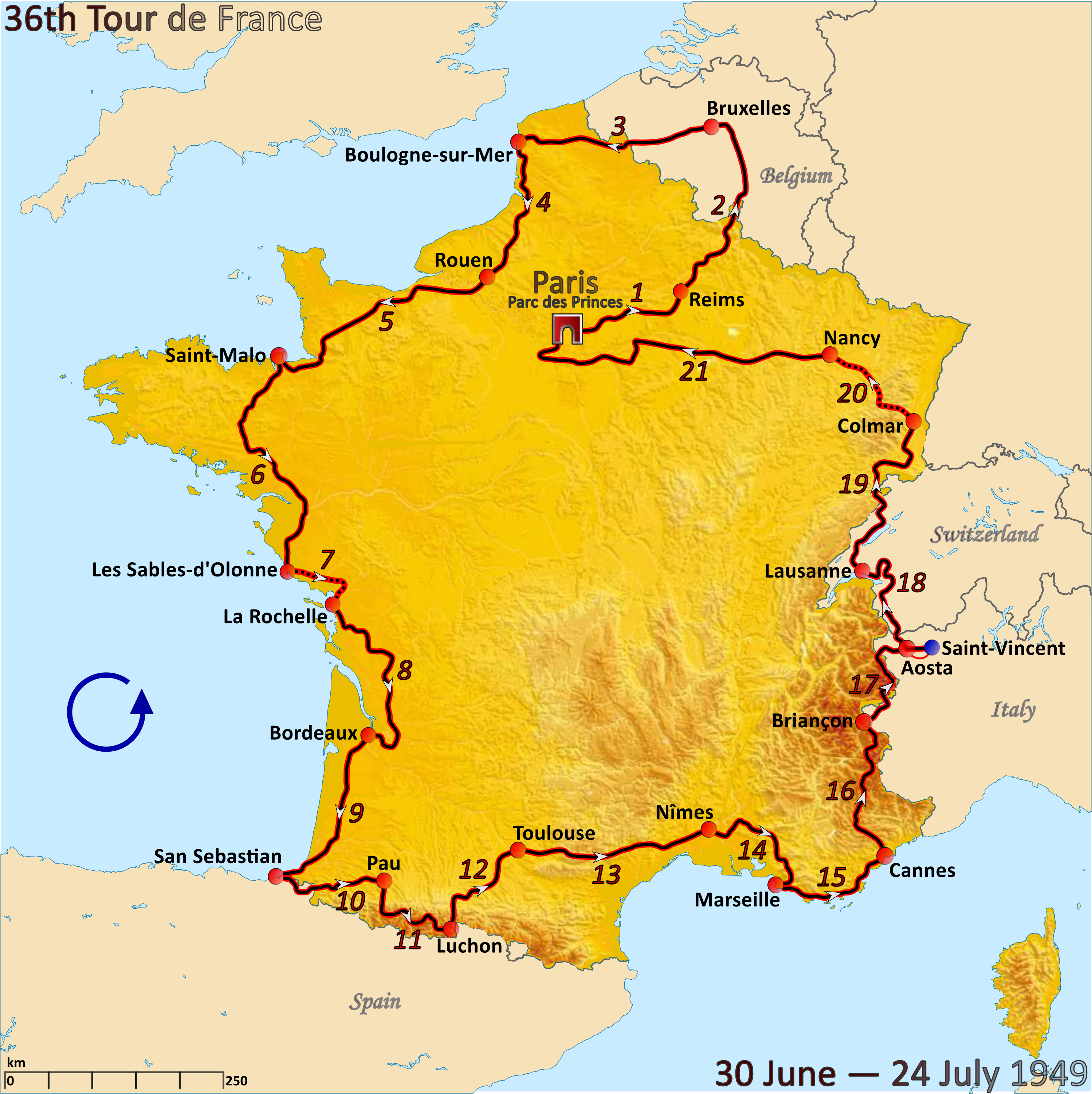
- Route of the 1949 Tour de France followed counterclockwise, starting and finishing in Paris

Race details
- Dates: 30 June – 24 July 1949
- Stages: 21
- Distance: 4,808 km (2,988 mi)
- Winning time: 149h 40' 49"

Results
Jersey awarded to the overall winner	Winner	Fausto Coppi (ITA)	(Italy)
	Second	Gino Bartali (ITA)	(Italy)
	Third	Jacques Marinelli (FRA)	(Île-de-France)
	Mountains	Fausto Coppi (ITA)	(Italy)
	Team	Italy	

The 1949 Tour de France was the 36th edition of the Tour de France, taking place from 30 June to 24 July. It consisted of 21 stages over 4,808 km (2,988 mi).

The Italian team had internal problems, because Gino Bartali and Fausto Coppi could both be the team leader. During the selection procedure, Coppi almost refused to start the race, but he was convinced to start. During the race, Coppi almost pulled out, because he felt he did not have full support from the team captain. In the Alps, Coppi recovered. The race was won by Coppi, with second place taken by teammate Bartali, the winner of the previous year. Coppi also won the mountains classification, while his Italian team won the team classification.

== Innovations and changes ==
The 1949 Tour de France marked the first time that the Tour de France had a stage finish in Spain, when it stopped in San Sebastian in the ninth stage. While the mountains had been categorised into two categories in 1948, in 1949 the third category was added.

== Teams ==
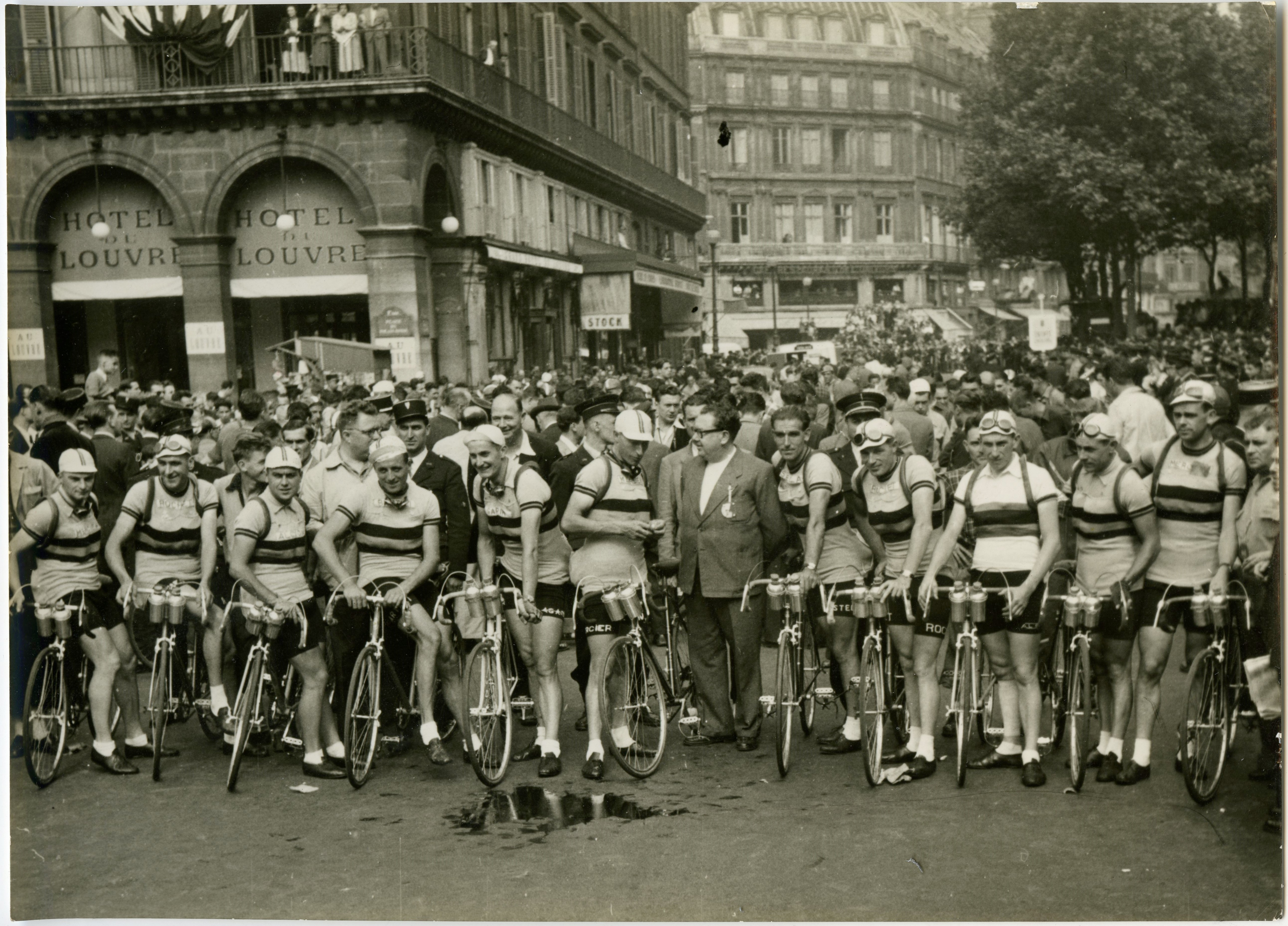
Belgian team in Paris, 1949 (collection KOERS. Museum of Cycle Racing)

As was the custom since the 1930 Tour de France, the 1949 Tour de France was contested by national and regional teams. The three major cycling countries in 1949, Italy, Belgium and France, each sent a team of 12 cyclists. Other countries sent teams of 6 cyclists: Switzerland, Luxembourg, Netherlands and Spain. Italy and Belgium also sent two extra teams of young riders of 6 cyclists each. The French regional cyclists were divided into four teams of 12 cyclists: Île-de-France, West/North, Centre/South-West and South-East. Altogether this made 120 cyclists. There were 57 French cyclists, 22 Italian, 18 Belgian, 6 Dutch, 6 Luxembourg, 6 Spanish, 6 Swiss and 1 Polish cyclist.

The teams entering the race were:

- Italy
- Belgium
- France
- Switzerland
- Luxembourg
- Netherlands
- Spain
- Italy Cadets
- Belgium Aiglons
- Île-de-France
- West/North
- Centre/South-West
- South-East

== Pre-race favourites ==
In the previous year, Fausto Coppi refused to enter the Tour de France because of personal problems with his teammate Gino Bartali. Bartali had won the previous Tour, and was trying to equal Philippe Thys by winning the Tour three times. Coppi had won the 1949 Giro d'Italia, and wanted to be the first one to achieve the Tour-Giro double in one year. The Italian team manager Alfredo Binda convinced them two weeks before the start of the race to join forces, so both Italians were in the race.

== Route and stages ==
The 1949 Tour de France started on 30 June, and had four rest days, in Les Sables-d'Olonne, Pau, Cannes and Aosta. The highest point of elevation in the race was 2,770 m (9,090 ft) at the summit of the Col de l'Iseran mountain pass on stage 17.

Stage characteristics and winners
Stage	Date	Course	Distance	Type	Winner
1	30 June	Paris to Reims	182 km (113 mi)	Plain stage	Marcel Dussault (FRA)
2	1 July	Reims to Brussels (Belgium)	273 km (170 mi)	Plain stage	Roger Lambrecht (BEL)
3	2 July	Brussels (Belgium) to Boulogne-sur-Mer	211 km (131 mi)	Plain stage	Norbert Callens (BEL)
4	3 July	Boulogne-sur-Mer to Rouen	185 km (115 mi)	Plain stage	Lucien Teisseire (FRA)
5	4 July	Rouen to Saint-Malo	293 km (182 mi)	Plain stage	Ferdinand Kübler (SUI)
6	5 July	Saint-Malo to Les Sables-d'Olonne	305 km (190 mi)	Plain stage	Adolphe Deledda (FRA)
	6 July	Les Sables-d'Olonne		Rest day	
7	7 July	Les Sables-d'Olonne to La Rochelle	92 km (57 mi)	Individual time trial	Fausto Coppi (ITA)
8	8 July	La Rochelle to Bordeaux	262 km (163 mi)	Plain stage	Guy Lapébie (FRA)
9	9 July	Bordeaux to San Sebastián (Spain)	228 km (142 mi)	Plain stage	Louis Caput (FRA)
10	10 July	San Sebastián (Spain) to Pau	192 km (119 mi)	Plain stage	Fiorenzo Magni (ITA)
	11 July	Pau		Rest day	
11	12 July	Pau to Luchon	193 km (120 mi)	Stage with mountain(s)	Jean Robic (FRA)
12	13 July	Luchon to Toulouse	134 km (83 mi)	Plain stage	Rik Van Steenbergen (BEL)
13	14 July	Toulouse to Nîmes	289 km (180 mi)	Plain stage	Emile Idée (FRA)
14	15 July	Nîmes to Marseille	199 km (124 mi)	Plain stage	Jean Goldschmidt (LUX)
15	16 July	Marseille to Cannes	215 km (134 mi)	Plain stage	Désiré Keteleer (BEL)
	17 July	Cannes		Rest day	
16	18 July	Cannes to Briançon	275 km (171 mi)	Stage with mountain(s)	Gino Bartali (ITA)
17	19 July	Briançon to Aosta	257 km (160 mi)	Stage with mountain(s)	Fausto Coppi (ITA)
	20 July	Aosta		Rest day	
18	21 July	Aosta to Lausanne	265 km (165 mi)	Stage with mountain(s)	Vincenzo Rossello (ITA)
19	22 July	Lausanne to Colmar	283 km (176 mi)	Stage with mountain(s)	Raphaël Géminiani (FRA)
20	23 July	Colmar to Nancy	137 km (85 mi)	Mountain time trial	Fausto Coppi (ITA)
21	24 July	Nancy to Paris	340 km (211 mi)	Plain stage	Rik Van Steenbergen (BEL)
	Total		4,808 km (2,988 mi)		

== Race overview ==
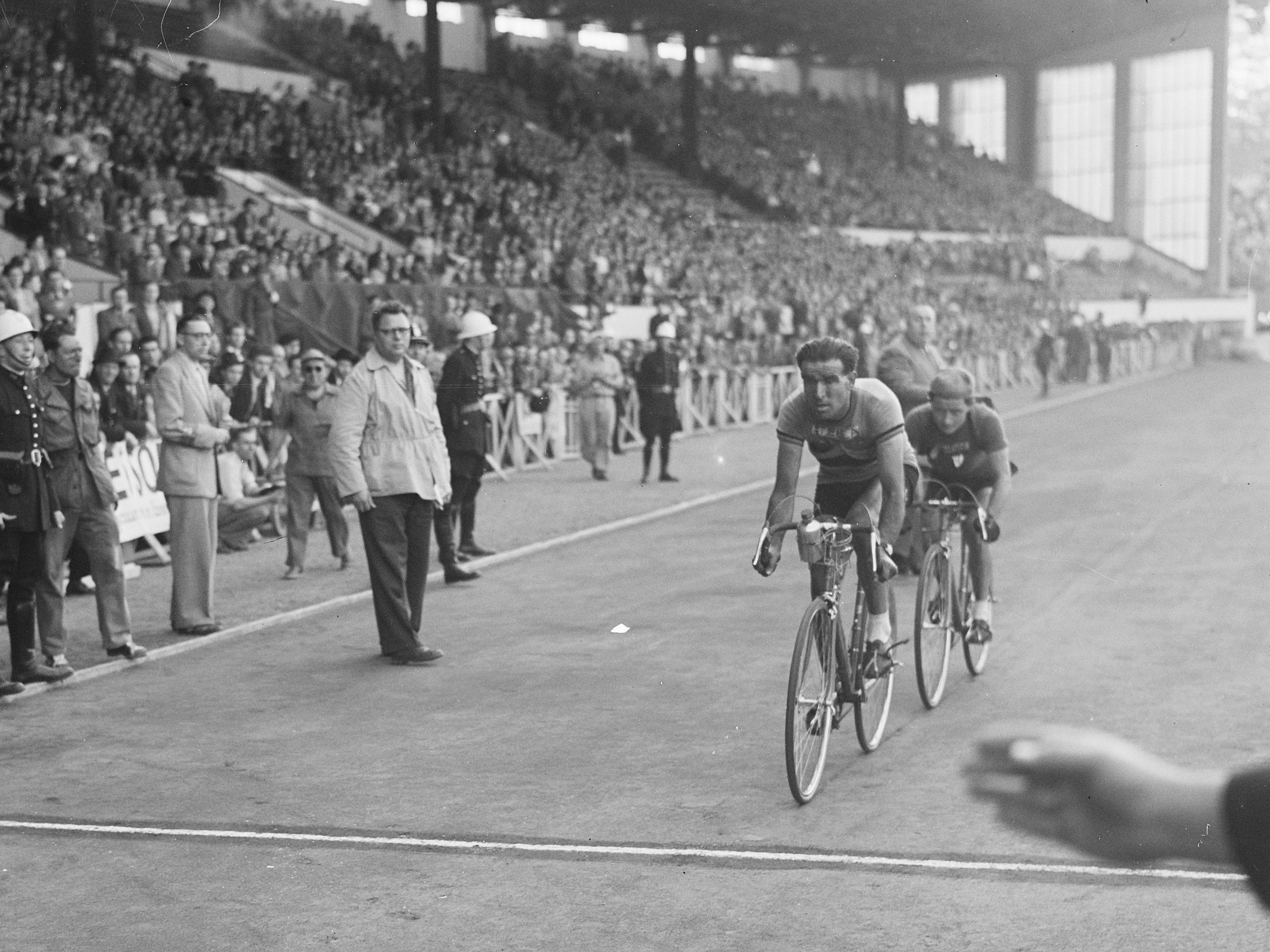
Roger Lambrecht winning the second stage ahead of Jacques Marinelli at Heysel Stadium in Brussels

In the early stages, Bartali and Coppi both lost time. Before the fifth stage, Coppi and Bartali both were not in the top fifteen of the general classification.

In that fifth stage, Coppi escaped together with the leader of the general classification, Jacques Marinelli. When they were leading by 6 minutes, Coppi and Marinelli fell in Mouen. Marinelli was not hurt and could continue, but Coppi's bike was broken. The Italian team car offered him a new one, but Coppi refused because he wanted his personal spare bike, and threatened to quit the race.

When Bartali reached Coppi, he saw the problem, and waited. Even later, the Italian team captain Binda arrived with Coppi's spare bike, and Bartali and Coppi started to ride. Coppi started to slow down, complaining he was hungry and exhausted. Bartali decided he could not wait anymore, and rode away from Coppi. Coppi came in 18 minutes late that stage. Later that night, it became clear that Coppi had been angry because the team leader had not been following him, even though he was in the leading group. Coppi did not want to race in a team where Bartali and not he was the leader. Binda tried to convince Coppi that he had been delayed, and he succeeded in keeping Coppi in the race. Also in that fifth stage, the Spanish team left the race, after constant insults from Spanish exiles who were against Francoist Spain.

In the Alps, Coppi recovered. In the sixteenth stage, Coppi escaped, and only Bartali followed him. It was Bartali's 35th birthday, and Coppi gave Bartali the stage victory. After that stage, Bartali was first in the general classification, with Coppi in second place, 82 seconds behind. In stage 17, Bartali and Coppi again were leading together. Around 40 km into the stage, Bartali punctured. Coppi waited for Bartali, but when Bartali later fell and twisted his ankle, team leader Binda allowed Coppi to take off alone. Coppi did so, won the stage, and decided the race.

That seventeenth stage finished in the Italian town Aosta. Many Italians had come to see the Tour de France, to cheer on their Italian heroes Coppi and Bartali but also to express their anger against the French cyclists, specifically Jean Robic, who had said in an interview that he could beat those Italians easily. Insults were shouted against non-Italians in the Tour, and some windows of French cars were smashed. For safety, and because there were not enough telephone connections for the journalists, most Tour officials and journalists decided to spend the night in Switzerland.

When the Tour returned to France in the nineteenth stage to Colmar, some French spectators took revenge by throwing tomatoes and rocks towards the Italian cyclists and followers. The organisation apologised for this behavior, and the Italian cyclists accepted this apology.

In the rest of the race, Coppi's lead was not endangered; Coppi won the mountain time trial in stage 20, and won the Tour with a margin of more than ten minutes over Bartali.

== Classification leadership and minor prizes ==
The time that each cyclist required to finish each stage was recorded, and these times were added together for the general classification. If a cyclist had received a time bonus, it was subtracted from this total; all time penalties were added to this total. The cyclist with the least accumulated time was the race leader, identified by the yellow jersey. Of the 120 cyclists, 55 finished the race.

Points for the mountains classification were earned by reaching the mountain tops first. There were two types of mountain tops: the hardest ones, in category 1, gave 10 points to the first cyclist, the easier ones, in category 2, gave 5 points to the first cyclist, and the easiest ones, in category 3, gave 3 points.

The team classification was calculated by adding the times in the general classification of the best three cyclists per team. The Italy Cadets and Switzerland finished with two cyclists each, so they were not eligible for this classification.

The Souvenir Henri Desgrange was given in honour of Tour founder Henri Desgrange to the first rider to pass a point by his final residence, the "Villa Mia" in Beauvallon, Grimaud, on the French Riviera on stage 15. This prize was won by Paul Giguet. The special award for the best regional rider was won by third-placed Jacques Marinelli.

Classification leadership by stage
Stage	Winner	General classification	Mountains classification (Note: No jersey was awarded to the leader of the mountains classification until a white jersey with red polka dots was introduced in 1975.)	Team classification
1	Marcel Dussault	Marcel Dussault	no award	Belgium
2	Roger Lambrecht	Roger Lambrecht	no award	Belgium
3	Norbert Callens	Norbert Callens	no award	Belgium
4	Lucien Teisseire	Jacques Marinelli	no award	France
5	Ferdinand Kübler	Jacques Marinelli	no award	Île-de-France
6	Adolphe Deledda	Jacques Marinelli	no award	Île-de-France
7	Fausto Coppi	Jacques Marinelli	no award	Île-de-France
8	Guy Lapébie	Jacques Marinelli	no award	Île-de-France
9	Louis Caput	Jacques Marinelli	no award	Île-de-France
10	Fiorenzo Magni	Fiorenzo Magni	no award	Île-de-France
11	Jean Robic	Fiorenzo Magni	Fausto Coppi	Italy
12	Rik Van Steenbergen	Fiorenzo Magni	Fausto Coppi	Italy
13	Emile Idée	Fiorenzo Magni	Fausto Coppi	Italy
14	Jean Goldschmidt	Fiorenzo Magni	Fausto Coppi	Italy
15	Désiré Keteleer	Fiorenzo Magni	Fausto Coppi	Île-de-France
16	Gino Bartali	Gino Bartali	Fausto Coppi	Italy
17	Fausto Coppi	Fausto Coppi	Fausto Coppi	Italy
18	Vincenzo Rossello	Fausto Coppi	Fausto Coppi	Italy
19	Raphaël Géminiani	Fausto Coppi	Fausto Coppi	Italy
20	Fausto Coppi	Fausto Coppi	Fausto Coppi	Italy
21	Rik Van Steenbergen	Fausto Coppi	Fausto Coppi	Italy
Final		Fausto Coppi	Fausto Coppi	Italy

== Final standings ==
=== General classification ===
Final general classification (1–10)
Rank	Rider	Team	Time
1	Fausto Coppi (ITA)	Italy	149h 40' 49"
2	Gino Bartali (ITA)	Italy	+ 10' 55"
3	Jacques Marinelli (FRA)	Île-de-France	+ 25' 13"
4	Jean Robic (FRA)	West/North	+ 34' 28"
5	Marcel Dupont (BEL)	Belgium Aiglons	+ 38' 59"
6	Fiorenzo Magni (ITA)	Italy Cadets	+ 42' 10"
7	Stan Ockers (BEL)	Belgium	+ 44' 35"
8	Jean Goldschmit (LUX)	Luxembourg	+ 47' 24"
9	Apo Lazaridès (FRA)	France	+ 52' 28"
10	Pierre Cogan (FRA)	West/North	+ 1h 08' 55"

Final general classification (11–55)
Rank	Rider	Team	Time
11	Roger Lambrecht (BEL)	Belgium	+ 1h 17' 21"
12	Gino Sciardis (ITA)	Italy	+ 1h 22' 01"
13	Jean Kirchen (LUX)	Luxembourg	+ 1h 28' 14"
14	Lucien Teisseire (FRA)	France	+ 1h 34' 56"
15	Bim Diederich (LUX)	Luxembourg	+ 1h 35' 54"
16	Robert Chapatte (FRA)	France	+ 1h 38' 40"
17	Serafino Biagioni (ITA)	Italy	+ 1h 38' 47"
18	Nello Lauredi (FRA)	South-East	+ 1h 43' 22"
19	Georges Aeschlimann (SUI)	Switzerland	+ 1h 47' 52"
20	Giuseppe Tacca (FRA)	Île-de-France	+ 1h 48' 01"
21	Marcel De Mulder (BEL)	Belgium Aiglons	+ 1h 49' 16"
22	Jean-Marie Goasmat (FRA)	West/North	+ 2h 00' 14"
23	André Brulé (FRA)	Île-de-France	+ 2h 01' 18"
24	Bruno Pasquini (ITA)	Italy	+ 2h 08' 44"
25	Raphaël Géminiani (FRA)	France	+ 2h 10' 09"
26	Pierre Brambilla (ITA)	South-East	+ 2h 22' 33"
27	Jacques Geus (BEL)	Belgium Aiglons	+ 2h 26' 06"
28	René Vietto (FRA)	France	+ 2h 30' 11"
29	Rik Van Steenbergen (BEL)	Belgium	+ 2h 31' 13"
30	Louis Deprez (FRA)	France	+ 2h 32' 56"
31	Roger Lévêque (FRA)	Centre/South-West	+ 2h 33' 29"
32	Lucien Lazaridès (FRA)	France	+ 2h 48' 35"
33	Brik Schotte (BEL)	Belgium	+ 2h 50' 29"
34	Désiré Keteleer (BEL)	Belgium	+ 3h 01' 40"
35	Georges Martin (FRA)	South-East	+ 3h 16' 26"
36	Vincenzo Rossello (ITA)	Italy	+ 3h 17' 43"
37	Florent Mathieu (BEL)	Belgium	+ 3h 21' 41"
38	Tino Ausenda (ITA)	Italy Cadets	+ 3h 30' 32"
39	Paul Pineau (FRA)	Centre/South-West	+ 3h 31' 19"
40	Gottfried Weilenmann (SUI)	Switzerland	+ 3h 40' 13"
41	Mario Ricci (ITA)	Italy	+ 3h 40' 51"
42	Albert Dolhats (FRA)	Centre/South-West	+ 3h 43' 38"
43	Marcel Hendrickx (BEL)	Belgium Aiglons	+ 3h 44' 03"
44	Édouard Muller (FRA)	Île-de-France	+ 3h 50' 18"
45	Antonin Rolland (FRA)	South-East	+ 3h 50' 46"
46	Georges Ramoulux (FRA)	Centre/South-West	+ 3h 56' 13"
47	Paul Giguet (FRA)	South-East	+ 4h 21' 26"
48	Jean Blanc (FRA)	Centre/South-West	+ 4h 39' 51"
49	André Mahé (FRA)	West/North	+ 4h 48' 40"
50	Luciano Pezzi (ITA)	Italy	+ 4h 53' 35"
51	Ettore Milano (ITA)	Italy	+ 5h 03' 51"
52	Giovanni Corrieri (ITA)	Italy	+ 5h 11' 57"
53	Angelo Brignole (ITA)	Italy	+ 5h 38' 28"
54	Custodio Dos Reis (FRA)	Centre/South-West	+ 5h 50' 09"
55	Guido De Santi (ITA)	Italy	+ 6h 06' 51"

=== Mountains classification ===
Final mountains classification (1–9)
Rank	Rider	Team	Points
1	Fausto Coppi (ITA)	Italy	81
2	Gino Bartali (ITA)	Italy	68
3	Jean Robic (FRA)	West/North	64
4	Apo Lazaridès (FRA)	France	48
5	Lucien Lazaridès (FRA)	France	29
6	Stan Ockers (BEL)	Belgium	22
7	Giuseppe Tacca (FRA)	Île-de-France	16
7	Jacques Marinelli (FRA)	Île-de-France	16
9	Raphaël Géminiani (FRA)	France	14
9	André Brulé (FRA)	Île-de-France	14

=== Team classification ===
Final team classification
Rank	Team	Time
1	Italy	450h 35' 23"
2	West/North	+ 2h 10' 21"
3	Luxembourg	+ 2h 18' 16"
4	France	+ 2h 33' 08"
5	Île-de-France	+ 2h 41' 36"
6	Belgium	+ 3h 00' 13"
7	Belgium Aiglons	+ 3h 21' 25"
8	South-East	+ 5h 49' 25"
9	Centre/South-West	+ 8h 15' 30"

== Aftermath ==
As Coppi had also won the 1949 Giro d'Italia, he became the first person to achieve the Giro-Tour double.

After the unrest in Aosta and Colmar, there were doubts if the Italian cyclists would return in 1950, and if that Tour should pass through Italy again. At the start of the 1950 Tour de France, the Italian team was present and the Tour was scheduled to go through Italy, but after further incidents the Italian team left the race, and the stage through Italy was rerouted.

Coppi would go on to repeat the Giro-Tour double in 1952.

== Bibliography ==
- Augendre, Jacques (2016). "Guide historique" [Historical guide] (PDF). Tour de France (in French). Paris: Amaury Sport Organisation. Archived (PDF) from the original on 17 August 2016.
- McGann, Bill; McGann, Carol (2006). The Story of the Tour de France: 1903–1964. Vol. 1. Indianapolis, IN: Dog Ear Publishing. ISBN 978-1-59858-180-5.
- Seray, Jacques [in French]; Lablaine, Jacques (2006). Henri Desgrange, l'homme qui créa le Tour de France [Henri Desgrange, the man who created the Tour de France] (in French). Saint-Malo, France: Editions Cristel. ISBN 978-2-84421-042-5.
- Nauright, John; Parrish, Charles (2012). Sports Around the World: History, Culture, and Practice. Vol. 2. Santa Barbara, CA: ABC-CLIO. ISBN 978-1-59884-300-2.
