= Jacques Augendre =

French journalist (1925–2025)

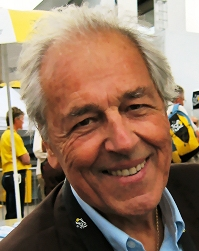
- Born: 28 April 1925; Paris, France
- Died: 18 February 2025 (aged 99); Cormeilles-en-Parisis, France
- Occupation: Journalist
- Known for: Reporting on the Tour de France

Jacques Augendre (28 April 1925 – 18 February 2025) was a French journalist and the first to have followed fifty Tours de France. Jacques Goddet covered 53 but from 1936 to 1986 he was also the race organiser. Pierre Chany would have been the first journalist to 50 Tours de France had he not died in 1996 within weeks of the start.

Augendre missed the 1947, 1952, 1954 and 1959 Tours, when he was kept in Paris to supervise other reporters' accounts. He followed his 50th Tour in 2001.

== Background ==
Jacques Augendre, the son of a former cyclist, raced as a boy during the German occupation of France during the second world war. He qualified for the 1943 Premier Pas Dunlop, effectively the national youth championship, but was unplaced. It was won by Raphaël Géminiani, with Louison Bobet sixth.

Augendre began as a journalist in 1944 at Témoignage Chrétien, a weekly, and began writing for the national sports daily, L'Équipe, in February 1946. He stayed at the paper, on the staff or as a freelance, until 1965. He worked for Le Monde, a general news daily, from 1965 to 1990, writing about cycling, expanding the general sports coverage. He also wrote for Midi Libre for 40 years and for the magazines, Miroir du Cyclisme and Miroir Sprint before becoming editor of the monthly, Le Cycle.

In 2005 he collaborated in Le tour de France pour la liberté de la presse, a book from which the profits supported the cause of press freedom around the world.

Augendre died on 18 February 2025, at the age of 99.

== Tour de France ==
The Tour de France was suspended during the second world war and restarted in 1947. The pre-war organiser, Jacques Goddet, was still the organiser but his former employer, L'Auto, had been closed after the war for collaboration with the Germans. Goddet started a new paper, L'Équipe, which won government approval to run the race after a competition with other contenders. In 1947 and 1948, Augendre stayed in Paris to supervise reports sent by correspondents and by press agencies. He followed his first Tour in 1949, when Fausto Coppi overcame another Italian, Gino Bartali, after a Frenchman in a regional team, Jacques Marinelli, had profited from the battle between them to wear the yellow jersey of leadership.

He said all Tours are exciting but that the most enjoyable was 1953, when Louison Bobet won after finishing fourth in 1948 and third in 1950. He said:

""At that time, there were national and regional teams. Bobet and Raphaël Géminiani of France were challenged by the 1947 Tour winner, Jean Robic of Brittany. Robic wore the yellow jersey and was known to taunt Bobet and 'Gem'. Like a boxer, he said to journalists that the French team did not frighten him and that he could not be defeated by such bad riders. During the 13th stage from Albi to Béziers, four team-mates from the French national team - including Geminiani and Bobet - attacked at the very beginning. The course was quite hilly and the breakaway's advantage grew quickly. At the finish, after a puncture and a fall, Robic had lost 15 minutes... and the Tour de France. In the legendary stage to Briançon, which included the three legendary passes - the cols of Allos (rising to 2,250m), Vars (2,110m) and the epic Izoard (2,361m) - one team-mate of Bobet had escaped. Between him and the peloton were Bobet, Federico Bahamontes and the Spaniard's main mountain rival (and the eventual King of the Mountains that year), Jésus Lorono. While climbing the Vars pass, Bobet was tired - almost dead - but at the top he accelerated and put distance into Lorono. I followed him on a motorbike back-seat and I could see the pain on his face. He caught up with his team-mate and won the stage. In the Casse Déserte on the Izoard, Fausto Coppi was there as a spectator. When Bobet went past, he summed up his thoughts in four simple words: 'He is so beautiful'."

Augendre said Eddy Merckx was the greatest rider he had seen, that Bernard Hinault was the most gifted, and Bobet the most courageous.

Augendre became the Tour de France's historian and archivist in 1991.

== Selected published works ==
- Chapatte, Robert; Augendre, Jacques (1964). Cyclisme. Technique, entraînement, compétition (in French). Paris, France: Amphora.
- Augendre, Jacques (1991). Les Sommets Du Tour de France (in French). USA: Solar. p. 157. ISBN 978-2263017629.
- Augendre, Jacques (1993). Vive le tour, le grand livre du tour de France (in French). France: Scanéditions. ISBN 978-2209067534.
- Augendre, Jacques (2000). Fausto Coppi (hardback). London, UK: Bromley Books. p. 157. ISBN 978-0953172962.
- Augendre, Jacques (2008). Pascuito, Bernard (ed.). Anquetil-Poulidor : Un divorce français (in French). France: Broché. p. 124. ISBN 978-2350850528.
- Augendre, Jacques; Cormier, Jean; Cormier, Jennifer; De Lassus, Symbad (2015). Antoine Blondin : La Legende Du Tour (in French). USA: Editions Du Rocher. ISBN 978-2268076157.

After 1996, Augendre authored Livre du Tour, the official guide of the Tour.

== Prizes ==
- Plume Francis Huger 2005
- Grand Prix de la Litérature sportive 2005
- Prix Antoine Blondin 2006 for "Antoine Blondin, un singe en été"
- Prix Antoine Blondin 2007 for "La France vue du Tour"
