= Breakaway specialist =

Type of road racing cyclist

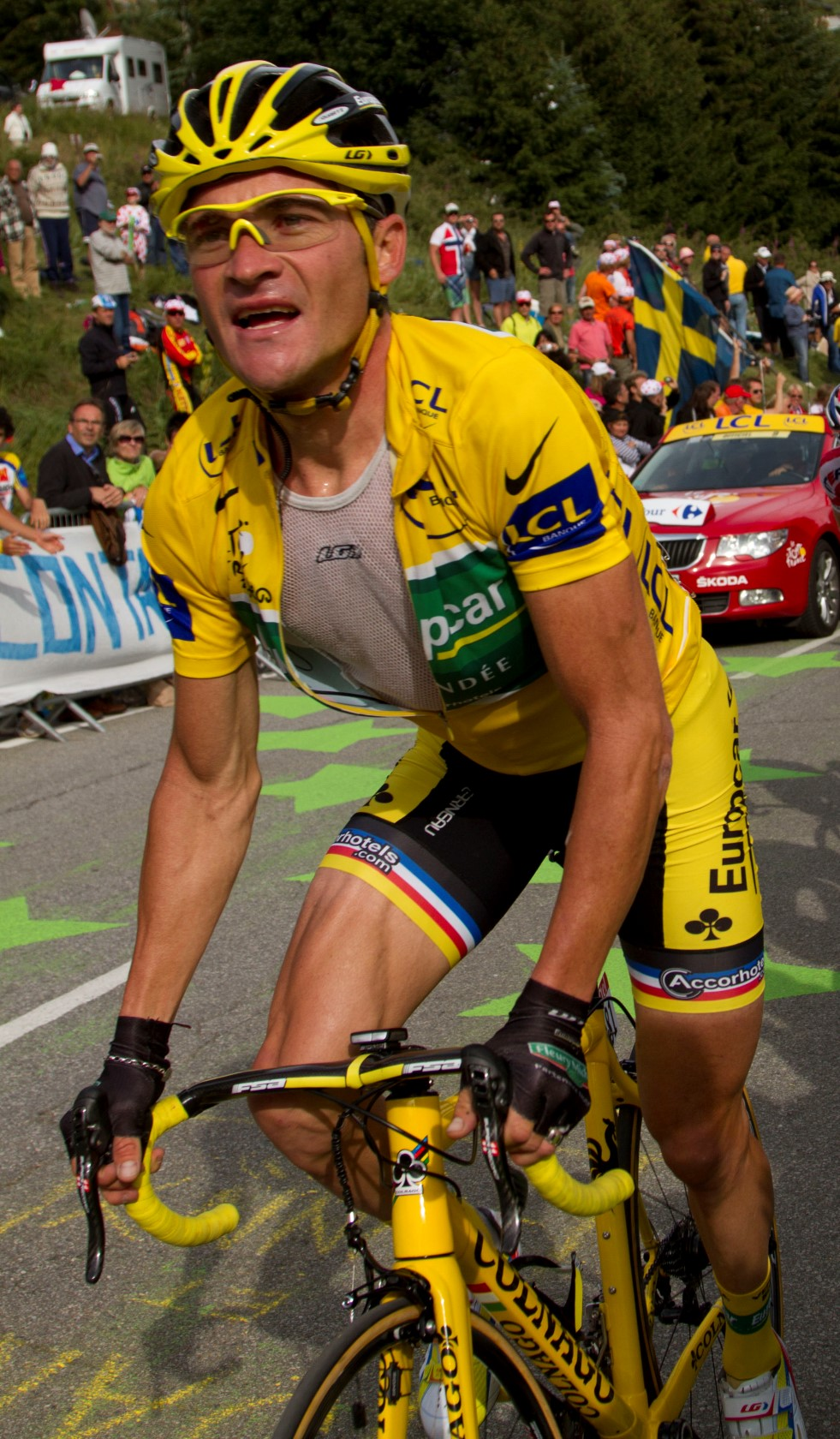
Thomas Voeckler rose to prominence for his breakaway exploits in the Tour de France

In bicycle racing, a breakaway specialist is a rider who is specialized in attacking the race from the start in order to show off their sponsor and to try their luck in winning the stage without having to fight with the whole peloton at the finish line.

The French term for a breakaway specialist is baroudeur or adventurer, which comes from the Arabic, where its meaning is “dynamite”.

== Details ==
Examples of such racers include Thomas De Gendt, Jens Voigt, Thomas Voeckler, Alessandro De Marchi, Tony Martin, Sylvain Chavanel, Sandy Casar, Pierrick Fédrigo, Luis León Sánchez, Jérémy Roy, Steve Cummings, Lilian Calmejane, Jacky Durand, and Ben Healy.

Cyclists who regularly participate in breaks are typically neither particularly fast climbers nor sprinters, and getting in a break offers their best chance of winning the stage or race.

While many riders will occasionally take part in breaks, the most prominent breakaway specialists are known for the frequency of their attempts, the long distances they cover in small groups or even alone, and for the (relatively rare) wins which can gain them great prestige in the peloton and with fans. Voigt, however, claims that nine times out of ten breakaways fail.

Robert Chapatte, a French ex-professional cyclist turned TV commentator, calculated that a speeding peloton takes 10 km to gain back one minute on a breakaway, though with advances in bike technology and rider fitness it’s now more like 90 seconds. This has since become known as Chapatte's Law.

Chapatte held that the minute was precise. Anything less and the break would fail, as when Rolf Sørensen was caught a few hundred metres before the line when he held 56 seconds rather than a minute on the Gap stage of the Tour de France in 1996. Chapatte insisted too that a lone rider with a minute's lead had more chance than a group with a larger lead. While a lone rider would ride hard to the end, a group will ease up to gather breath for the sprint and to watch each other for surprise attacks. The law has suffered in modern times by committed chases organised by teams to get their sprinters to the front.

Gaining time in breakaways can also result in riders making unexpected challenges in the General classification. At the 2004 Tour de France, after escaping with five other riders during the fifth stage, Thomas Voeckler gained significant time against the peloton, and earned the yellow jersey (French: maillot jaune). Remarkably, he defended his jersey for ten days, even on stages not well-suited to his strengths. With the yellow jersey on his shoulders, and intense media attention all around him, Voeckler only rode stronger. He survived the dreaded climbs of the Pyrenees seconds ahead of Lance Armstrong. Voeckler finally surrendered the jersey to Armstrong on stage 15 in the French Alps. History repeated itself at the 2011 Tour de France, when in the ninth stage of the race, Voeckler led a breakaway, survived a collision caused by a media support car that injured two other riders, and crossed the line second, taking the overall time lead and therefore wearing the yellow jersey. He held on to the jersey daily from the beginning of Stage 10 onwards, carrying it through all the Pyrenean mountain stages and into the Alps, but he was unable to retain it at the end of Stage 19, the queen stage finishing at Alpe d'Huez. Voeckler finished in fourth place in the final general classification, 3 minutes and 20 seconds behind the winner, Cadel Evans. It was Voeckler's highest final general classification in the Tour, and the highest placing of any Frenchman in the Tour, at the time, since Christophe Moreau's fourth-place overall finish in 2000. Similarly, at the 2012 Giro d'Italia, Thomas De Gendt took a surprise win on the penultimate queen stage of the race, attacking the group of favourites over the top of the Mortirolo Pass with 57 km to go to the finish, bypassing an earlier breakaway group at the front of the race and crossing the finish line atop a 22 km climb on the Stelvio Pass in first place. The performance moved him from eighth to fourth in the general classification, placing him within striking distance of the podium. In the race's final time trial, De Gendt put in another strong performance, finishing fifth on the stage and taking third place overall.
