= 1942 Tour de Suisse =

Race details
- Dates: 29 July–2 August 1942
- Stages: 5
- Distance: 1,176 km (730.7 mi)
- Winning time: 33h 39' 02"

Results
	Winner	Ferdinand Kübler (SUI)
	Second	Willy Kern (SUI)
	Third	Fritz Stocker (SUI)

The 1942 Tour de Suisse was the ninth edition of the Tour de Suisse cycle race and was held from 29 July to 2 August 1942. The race started and finished in Zürich. The race was won by Ferdinand Kübler.

== General classification ==
Final general classification

Rank	Rider	Time
1	Ferdinand Kübler (SUI)	33h 39' 02"
2	Willy Kern (SUI)	+ 8' 20"
3	Fritz Stocker (SUI)	+ 11' 22"
4	Pierre Brambilla (ITA)	+ 12' 36"
5	Hans Knecht (SUI)	+ 12' 48"
6	Pierre Cogan (FRA)	+ 15' 47"
7	Walter Diggelmann (SUI)	+ 20' 45"
8	Karl Wyss (SUI)	+ 21' 39"
9	Albert Sommer (SUI)	+ 29' 57"
10	Christophe Didier (LUX)	+ 31' 48"
