= Jean Blanc =

Jean Blanc may refer to:

- Jean-Pierre Blanc (1942–2004), French film director and screenwriter
- Jean Blanc (cyclist) (1918–1999), French racing cyclist
- Jean David Blanc (born 1968), French entrepreneur, film producer and jazz musician
