= 1948 Tour de Suisse =

Race details
- Dates: 12–19 June 1948
- Stages: 7
- Distance: 1,412 km (877.4 mi)
- Winning time: 41h 53' 58"

Results
	Winner	Ferdinand Kübler (SUI)
	Second	Giulio Bresci (ITA)
	Third	Hans Sommer (SUI)

The 1948 Tour de Suisse was the 12th edition of the Tour de Suisse cycle race and was held from 12 June to 19 June 1948. The race started and finished in Zürich. The race was won by Ferdinand Kübler.

== General classification ==
Final general classification

Rank	Rider	Time
1	Ferdinand Kübler (SUI)	41h 53' 58"
2	Giulio Bresci (ITA)	+ 18' 10"
3	Hans Sommer (SUI)	+ 20' 28"
4	Jean Robic (FRA)	+ 25' 46"
5	Jeng Kirchen (LUX)	+ 28' 30"
6	Armando Peverelli (ITA)	+ 30' 14"
7	Alfredo Martini (ITA)	+ 35' 07"
8	Georges Aeschlimann (SUI)	+ 38' 56"
9	Jean Goldschmit (LUX)	+ 40' 00"
10	Hugo Koblet (SUI)	+ 46' 01"
