= 1951 Tour de Suisse =

Race details
- Dates: 15–23 June 1951
- Stages: 8
- Distance: 1,882 km (1,169 mi)
- Winning time: 55h 15' 14"

Results
	Winner	Ferdinand Kübler (SUI)
	Second	Hugo Koblet (SUI)
	Third	Alfredo Martini (ITA)

The 1951 Tour de Suisse was the 15th edition of the Tour de Suisse cycle race and was held from June 15 to June 23,1951. The race started and finished in Zürich. The race was won by Ferdinand Kübler.

== General classification ==
Final general classification

Rank	Rider	Time
1	Ferdinand Kübler (SUI)	55h 15' 14"
2	Hugo Koblet (SUI)	+ 4' 15"
3	Alfredo Martini (ITA)	+ 14' 03"
4	Fritz Schär (SUI)	+ 17' 08"
5	Vittorio Rossello (ITA)	+ 25' 50"
6	Bruno Pasquini (ITA)	+ 28' 33"
7	Jeng Kirchen (LUX)	+ 29' 28"
8	Dino Rossi (ITA)	+ 30' 43"
9	Pasquale Fornara (ITA)	+ 32' 01"
10	Vincenzo Rossello (ITA)	+ 32' 35"
