= Norbert Callens =

Belgian cyclist

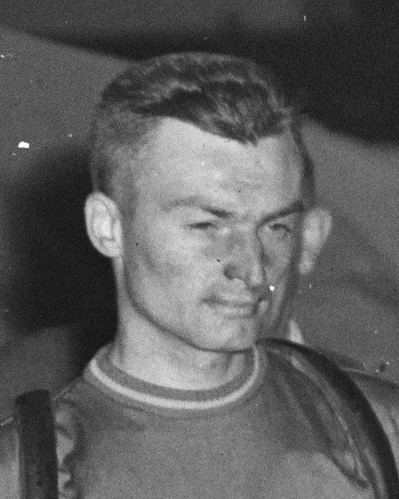
- Norbert Callens (Tour of the Netherlands, 1950)

Personal information
- Full name: Norbert Callens
- Born: 22 June 1924 Wakken, Belgium
- Died: 12 March 2005 (aged 80)

Cycling career
- Sport: Cycling
- Discipline: Road
- Role: Rider

Major wins
- Stage in 1949 Tour de France; Tour of Belgium

Norbert Callens (22 June 1924 in Wakken, West Flanders – 12 March 2005) was a former Belgian professional road bicycle racer. He was a professional from 1945 to 1952. His victories include one stage win in the Tour de France and the 1945 edition of the Tour of Belgium. In the 1949 Tour de France, Callens was leading the general classification after he won stage 3, finishing in Boulogne-sur-Mer. Unfortunately for Callens, the truck with the jerseys had broken down and there was no yellow jersey available. The next stage, Callens started with an unofficial yellow jersey, and lost the lead to Jacques Marinelli. In 1994, the Tour de France had a stage finish in Boulogne-sur-Mer again. Callens was invited there, and finally got his yellow jersey, 45 years late.

== Major results ==
1945
Machelen
Tour of Belgium
Coupe Marcel Vergeat St-Etienne
1947
Briek Schotte
1948
Harelbeke
1949
Omloop der Vlaamse Ardennen
Tour de France:

Winner stage 3
Leading general classification for one day
