= Léon Jomaux =

Belgian cyclist

Personal information
- Born: 8 March 1922 Couillet, Belgium
- Died: 15 March 1980 (aged 58) Charleroi, Belgium

Cycling career
- Sport: Cycling
- Role: Rider

Léon Jomaux (3 August 1922 – 15 March 1980) was a Belgian racing cyclist. He rode in the 1948 and 1949 Tour de France.
