= Marcel Dussault =

French cyclist (1926–2014)

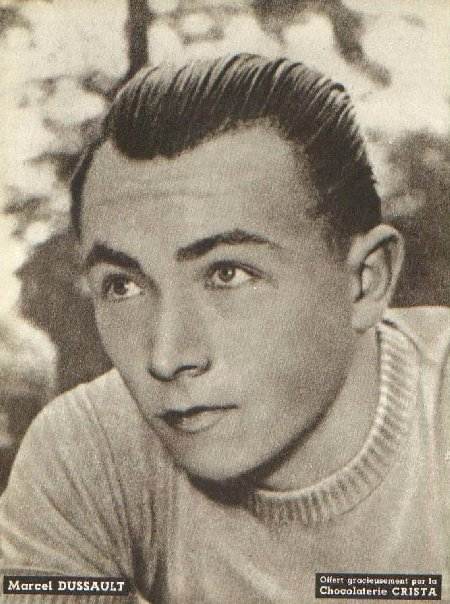

Personal information
- Full name: Marcel Dussault
- Born: 14 March 1926 La Châtre, France
- Died: 19 September 2014 (aged 88)

Cycling career
- Sport: Cycling
- Discipline: Road
- Role: Rider

Major wins
- Paris–Bourges (2 times)

Marcel Dussault (14 May 1926 – 19 September 2014) was a French professional road racing cyclist. He won 21 races in a professional career that ran from 1948 to 1959. He won Paris–Bourges in 1948 and 1949 and a stage in the 1949 Tour de France, wearing the yellow jersey as leader of the general classification the following day. He won another two Tour stages in 1950 and 1954.

== Major results ==
1948
Paris–Bourges
1949
Paris–Bourges
Circuit des Deux Ponts
Tour de France:

Winner stage 1
Wearing yellow jersey for one day

1950
Tour de France:

Winner stage 10

1953
3rd stage Tour du Sud-Est
1954
Tour de France:

Winner stage 3
