= Marcel Dupont =

Belgian cyclist

Personal information
- Full name: Marcel Dupont
- Born: 10 October 1917 Belgium
- Died: 6 March 2008 (aged 90)

Cycling career
- Sport: Cycling
- Discipline: Road
- Role: Rider

Marcel Dupont (10 October 1917, Jupille – 6 March 2008, Blegny) was a Belgian professional road bicycle racer, who finished 5th place in the 1949 Tour de France.

== Major results ==
1939
Herstal
1948
Malchamps
1949
Aachen
Tour de France:

5th place overall classification

1950
Roubaix–Huy
