= Guido De Santi =

Italian cyclist

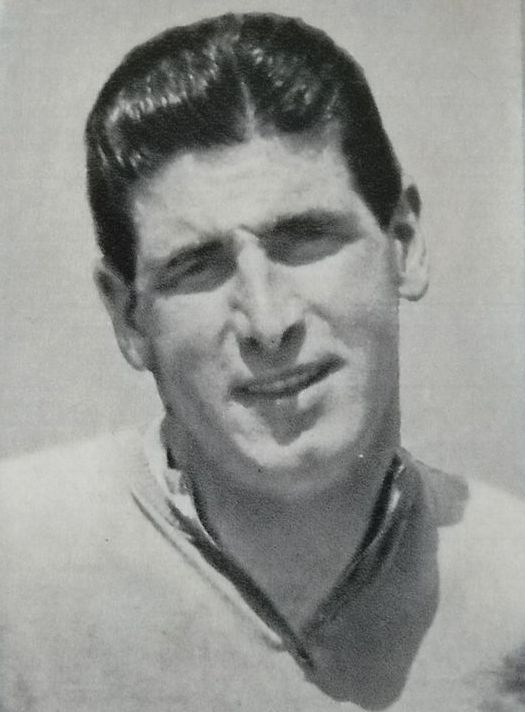

Personal information
- Full name: Guido De Santi
- Born: 16 May 1923 Trieste, Italy
- Died: 30 October 1998 (aged 75) Trieste, Italy

Cycling career
- Sport: Cycling
- Discipline: Road
- Role: Rider

Professional teams
- 1946–1948: Wilier Triestina
- 1949–1950: Atala
- 1950–1953: Colomb-Manera
- 1951: Patria W.K.C.
- 1951–1953: Benotto-Ursus-Fiorelli
- 1952: Rapier
- 1954: Bottecchia
- 1955: Leo-Chlorodont
- 1956–1957: Ignis-Varese

Major wins
- Giro d'Italia, 1 stage (1951); Deutschland Tour (1951); Tre Valli Varesine (1951)

Guido De Santi (16 May 1923 – 30 October 1998) was an Italian racing cyclist. He won the 1951 Deutschland Tour. He also rode in the 1948 and 1949 Tour de France.
