= Jean Robic =

French cyclist (1921–1980)

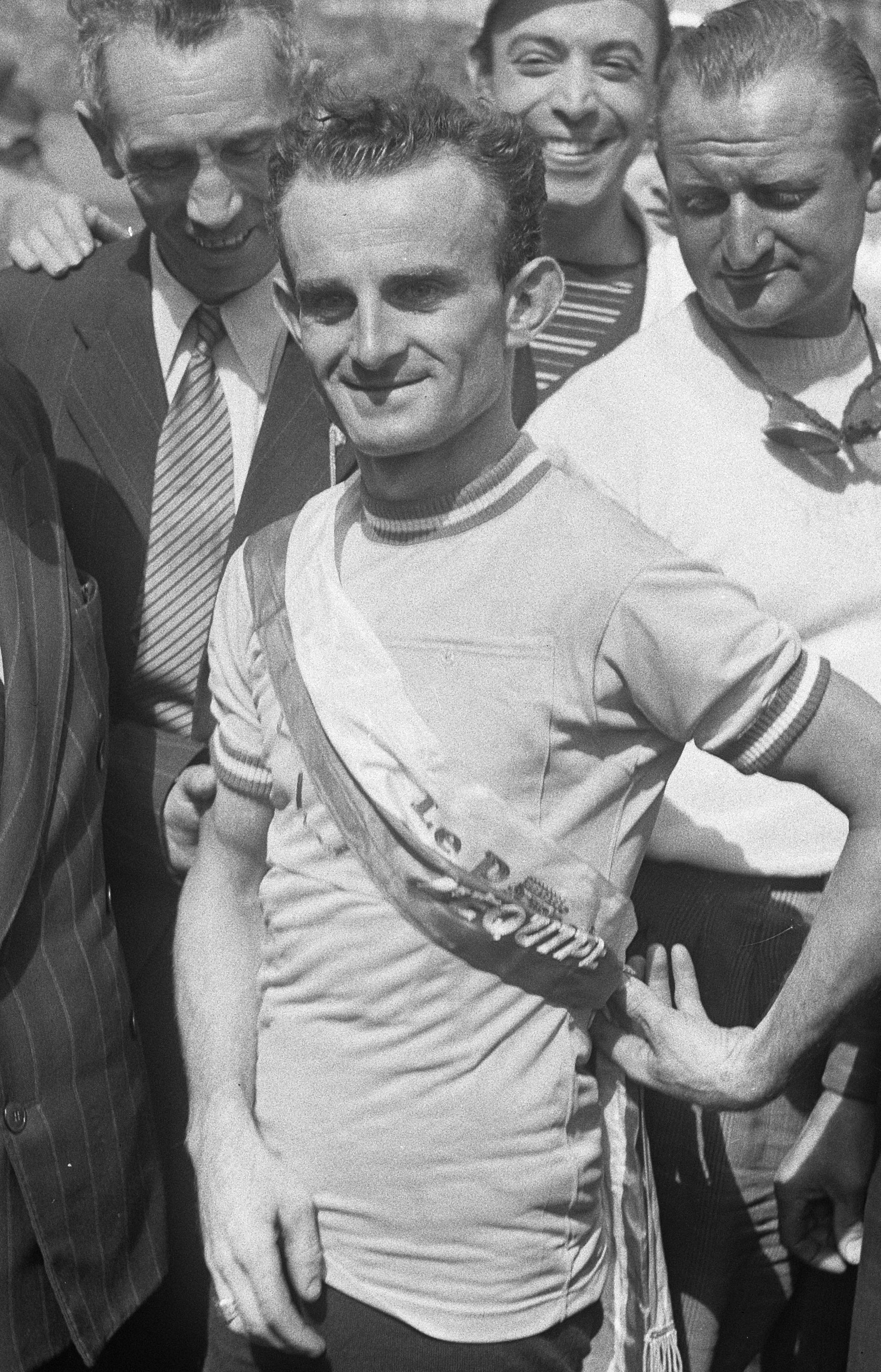
- Robic at the 1947 Tour de France

Personal information
- Full name: Jean Robic
- Nicknames: Biquet (Kid goat); Tête de cuir (Leather-head); Le farfadet de la lande Bretonne (Note: Robic was nicknamed Le farfadet de la lande Bretonne (the hobgoblin of the Brittany moor) by eminent authority René de Latour, but there is some doubt whether the nickname was accepted by Robic or his contemporaries. It may have been Latour's conflation of the nickname of Robic's sometime Breton team-mate Jean-Marie Goasmat, "le farfadet de Pluvigner" (the hobgoblin of Pluvigner). Goasmat was also small, slight and had big ears, whilst Pluvigner is a village in Morbihan, Brittany. As of 2014 Latour's is the only known use of the nickname for Robic, whereas for Goasmat there are other French language sources.); Gueule cassée
- Born: 10 June 1921 Vouziers, France
- Died: 6 October 1980 (aged 59) Claye-Souilly, France
- Height: 1.61 m (5 ft 3 in)
- Weight: 60 kg (132 lb)

Cycling career
- Sport: Cycling
- Discipline: Road
- Role: Rider
- Rider type: Climber

Professional teams
- 1943–1945: Génial Lucifer, (France)
- 1946–1949: Génial Lucifer–Hutchinson, (France)
- 1950: Thomann–Riva Sport
- 1951: Automoto–Dunlop, (France)
- 1952–1954: Terrot–Hutchinson (France)
- 1955: Gitane–Hutchinson (France)
- 1956–1957: Essor–Leroux (France)
- 1958–1959: Margnat–Coupry (France)
- 1960: Rochet–Margnat (France)
- 1961: Margnat–Rochet–Dunlop

Major wins
- Grand Tours Tour de France General classification (1947) 6 stages
Medal record
Men's cyclo-cross
Representing France
World Championships
Gold medal – first place	1950 Paris	Elite

Jean Robic (pronounced [ʒɑ̃ ʁɔ.bik]; 10 June 1921 – 6 October 1980) was a French road racing cyclist who won the 1947 Tour de France. Robic was a professional cyclist from 1943 to 1961. His diminutive stature (1.61m, 60 kg) and appearance was encapsulated in his nickname Biquet (Kid goat). For faster, gravity-assisted descents, he collected drinking bottles ballasted with lead or mercury at the summits of mountain climbs and "cols". After fracturing his skull in 1944 he always wore a trademark leather crash helmet.

== Origins ==
Robic has always been described as a Breton but he was born in the Ardennes region of France, where his father had found work as a carpenter.

"I was born in the Ardennes by mistake", Robic always insisted

his father having lived in Brittany before he moved. His father was a racing cyclist and passed the interest to his son. Robic moved to Brittany when he was seven and lived at Radenac. His childhood home is in a street now named for him.

Robic moved to Paris In February 1940 and became a cycle mechanic for the Sausin company. He started racing but made a poor impression on journalists. René de Latour of Sporting Cyclist wrote:

If anybody had told you or me in 1939 that this skinny kid of 17, with ears large enough to be of help with a back wind blowing—if we had been told that here was a future winner of the Tour de France, we would just have laughed. When his name first became known to journalists, he quickly became known as le farfadet de la lande bretonne—the hobgoblin of the Brittany moor. His arrival in the Paris area was not sensational. Robic won a few races out in the villages but this did not mean much. We had hundreds of boys like him in France.

== Early career ==
The outbreak of war in 1939 and then the German invasion of 1940 made cycle-racing possible but difficult in France. Robic rode cyclo-cross races and as many of the big road races that were still run. He turned professional in 1943. The following year he fell in Paris–Roubaix and finished the race with a broken skull. It was then that he started wearing the leather crash helmet for which he became known. The helmet won him the nickname of tête de cuir, or leather-head; his short stature also brought him the nickname "Biquet", or "kid goat".

== Tour de France ==
The Tour de France restarted after the war and Robic — still largely unknown — was selected for the regional team from north-west France, which meant largely from Brittany. "He was hardly interviewed by journalists; his retirement on the first day would not have earned him more than a line in small type at the bottom of an obscure page of the papers", said de Latour. Robic, recently married, told his wife Raymonde he would bring her the Tour's yellow jersey as a wedding present.

The first stage, from Paris to Lille was won by Ferdinand Kübler of Switzerland. Robic came ninth at 2m 9s. Robic won the stage on the fourth day, from Luxembourg to Strasbourg, then rode well through the Alps. René de Latour said:

And yet the journalists—I among them—still didn't think Robic a Tour winner. We thought so more than ever when, the next day, the route included the great Galibier, and Robic was out of the picture, with the Franco-Italian Camellini unapproachable up there in the snows. It seemed that Robic could not ride well two days running—and consistency is the biggest quality needed in the Tour.

The Tour then had easy stages along the Mediterranean where he could recover before riding still more strongly in the Pyrenees, leading the race over the Aubisque, Tourmalet and Peyresourde on the day from Luchon to Pau. The time he gained moved him to fifth place, and the 139 km time trial to third.

It was on the last day, from Caen, that he secured the race. The leader was Pierre Brambilla and tradition had it that the race leader was left unchallenged to win the Tour when it reached Paris. Robic, however, attacked at half-distance on the two-kilometre hill to the village of Bonsecours, outside Rouen. Another Frenchman, Édouard Fachleitner, went with him. So too did Brambilla, only to become sick from the effort. The main field was uncertain what to do and unfavourable to Brambilla so soon after the war because he was riding for a team of Italians living in France. It left the chase until too late. René de Latour wrote:

Robic had nothing to lose but his third place—end everything to gain. He jumped away as if his life depended on it. Luckily I had swapped from my car to the pillion of a motor-bike, and watched from close quarters every moment of the drama. When Robic opened a gap of a few lengths, Brambilla made a terrific effort to get back, and it seemed that was that. Then, from the bunch behind, that great rider, Fachleitner, sprinted past them both. Robic bounded on his wheel; Brambilla failed—and lost the Tour.

A group of riders were ahead of Robic and Fachleitner. They had lost too much time during the month that the Tour had lasted to challenge for race victory and so Léo Veron of the French national team told Lucien Teisseire to drop back and help Fachleitner. The three joined up 100 km from the finish and Fachleitner attacked several times. Robic countered him each time and then Teisseire took over. Robic took no notice because Teisseire was no danger. It was then, Fachleitner said, that Robic told him:

'Ride with me. You'll come second but I'll give you 100,000 francs'

That seemed straightforward (C'était honnête) to Fachleitner, "So I rode. In my head I was thinking: 'If he cracks or if he crashes, it'll be me who wins the Tour...' But he didn't crack and he didn't crash. He paid the 100,000 francs, not to me but to the French national team [for which Fachleitner was riding], which was the rule. Which brought me another outburst from René Vietto. 'You poor fool [fada],' he said to me, 'you should have asked for a lot more! What's this going to be worth once we've shared it between us?' Right up until his death, he kept saying to me 'You didn't ask enough.'"

Robic, who until then had never led the race, reached the finish at the Parc des Princes 13 minutes ahead of Brambilla. The stage was so fast that it finished an hour ahead of schedule. Legend has it that Brambilla buried his bike in his garden in disgust. More certain is that Robic gave his only yellow jersey to the Sainte-Anne-d'Auray basilica, where it still is, in thanks to Anne, patron saint of Bretons.

The twist to Robic's victory is that he wasn't the fastest rider in the race. Fachleitner had taken 3m 32s less to complete the Tour. It was the time bonuses that Robic picked up in the Pyrenees that made the difference.

== Other successes ==
Robic also won the Rome-Naples-Rome in 1950, the world cyclo-cross championship in 1950, and the Tour de Haute-Savoie and Polymultipliée in 1952.

== Personality and appearance ==
Pierre Chany said:
He had a face that was speckled like a bitter apple, large ears and a little nervous and muscular body. At the same time proud and stubborn, he detested all those whom nature had made better proportioned and those whom nature had given what he considered a more handsome body. He hated Louison Bobet, accusing of him of being a false Breton because he was born in Ille-et-Vilaine!

—

Robic was one of the shortest riders; 1m 61 in 1947 and 1m 59 in 1959. He weighed 60 kg. He rode a 19-inch (480 mm) frame but with 172 mm cranks when the norm was 170 mm. Robic was often bitter with the world.

One writer said: He was five-foot nothing [and] so light in weight that he ballasted his water bottles with lead to increase his momentum on the downhills. Tiny guy, blond curls crimped under a string-of-sausages helmet, gnarled face and Mr Punch hooked chin and nose... He wore a ring inscribed kenbeo kenmaro, 'to life, to death' in Breton.

Robic won few friends with his bad language and quick temper. He was at war with everyone, said the journalist Jacques Augendre. In 1959, Robic finished the Tour de France stage to Chalon-sur-Saône outside the time limit. The stage was won by the British rider, Brian Robinson, with an unusually large lead of 20 minutes. Other riders were required to finish the day within a set percentage of the winner's time and Robic didn't make it. Normally the judges would make an exception for a former winner but Robic's personality is said to have gone against him and he was put out of the race.

He was astute at exploiting rules. He collected lead filled drinking bottles at the top of major climbs because his lightness led to his descending mountains slower than he wanted. When the organisers forbade filling bottles with solids, he filled his with mercury instead. He bragged of his talent, once dismissing Gino Bartali and saying of the other leading Italian that he had " a Fausto Coppi in each leg"—meaning he was twice as good.

A fellow professional, André Mahé, said in Procycling in 2007 that Robic's personality and self-importance was such that he would stand in the doorway of a restaurant until all the diners had noticed him and then announce:

"Oui! C'est moi—Robic!"

== Doping ==
There were no doping rules in Robic's era. The historian and television commentator, Jean-Paul Ollivier, wrote of the 1950 Tour de France in which he said Robic was deeply depressed, weeping abundantly.

He thought the Tour was lost. He had a cold and went to bed shivering with a fever. The next day, the boss of the hotel, unaccustomed to the timetable of the Tour de France, forgot to get up. The riders had to prepare their own breakfast in record time. Robic had enteritis. He was weak [rien ne va plus]. Escorted by his team-mates, Robert Bonnaventure and Gino Sciardis, he finished the stage pitifully at St-Étienne and dropped from fourth to seventh place in the standings, 37 minutes behind Ferdi Kübler. Robic was still weak at the start of the time trial from St-Étienne to Lyon. His soigneur, Libaud, gave him an injection of solucamphor to get him going again [pour le remonter]

Robic said doping had always existed but that the most he had taken was a bottle of coffee mixed with "calva"—(Calvados).

== Personal life ==
In 1943 Robic met Raymonde Cornic, whose father owned the Rendez-vous des Bretons bar near the Gare Montparnasse in Paris. The two married four days before the 1947 Tour. They had a son, Jean-Lou, in 1948, another son, Alain, in 1949 and a daughter, Christine, in 1952. Robic's father was killed in September 1945 by the branch of a tree he was sawing and Robic acquired a house in Petit-Clamart for his mother. Robic and his wife lived in the suburb of Wissous and bought his mother a mercery shop there. His family still live in the region and have attended ceremonies in Robic's memory.

At 40, Robic took over the family bar.

== Retirement and death ==
Jock Wadley wrote:
Puteaux was where Robic had scored an important cyclo-cross win at the beginning of his main career. Robic's popularity has always been enormous. At his farewell, he was given a great reception. On the course was a very steep hill, which had to be covered 20 times. Robic, at 40, could have been dropped and nobody would have accused him of not trying. But he hung on with a grimace to show how he could suffer to finish his career en beauté. As he crossed the line, he was surrounded by riders less than half his age.

—

Robic fell again while in the running to win the Tour de France of 1953. He broke bones in his spine. He rode the Tour again in 1954, 1955 and 1959 without finishing. He rode local races and lived from the start money he was offered. He also went back to cyclo-cross, riding throughout the winter. Robic rode his last race in 1967, in the Puteaux suburb of Paris. He was congratulated at the finish by his old rival, Louison Bobet.

Robic found it hard to fit into an ordinary life when his career ended. He ran the family café but it failed, as did his marriage. From then on he became depressed. For a long time he went without work. At others, he tried stunts such as being the referee of professional wrestling bouts, where his shortness encouraged wrestlers to throw him out of the ring. He also sat on a bicycle in the publicity procession of the Tour de France. He became depressed and wandered the streets, asking for work, until his friend, Eugène Letendre, took him into his business.

He died in a car accident near Claye-Souilly on his way home from a party at Germigny-l'Évêque in which Joop Zoetemelk was celebrating his own win in the Tour. Robic's monument on the hill outside Rouen where he won the Tour shows him in his leather helmet. He is buried in the cemetery at Wissous A room in the town hall in Radenac is a museum in his memory.

== Career achievements ==
=== Major results ===
1945
National cyclo-cross championship
1947
Critérium International de cyclo-cross
Tour de France:

Winner stages 4, 7 and 15
Winner overall classification

1948
À travers Lausanne
1949
Tour de France:

Winner stage 11
4th place overall classification

1950
1st World cyclo-cross championship
Roma–Napoli–Roma
1952
Bol d'Or des Monédières Chaumeil
Polymultipliée
Etten-Leur
Tour de France:

Winner stage 15
5th place overall classification

1953
Tour de France:

Winner stage 11

=== Grand Tour results timeline ===
	1947	1948	1949	1950	1951	1952	1953	1954	1955	1956	1957	1958	1959
Giro d'Italia	DNE	DNE	DNE	DNF	DNE	DNE	DNE	DNE	DNE	DNE	DNE	DNE	DNE
Stages won	—	—	—	0	—	—	—	—	—	—	—	—	—
Mountains classification	—	—	—	NR	—	—	—	—	—	—	—	—	—
Points classification	N/A	N/A	N/A	N/A	N/A	N/A	N/A	N/A	N/A	N/A	N/A	—	—
Tour de France	1	16	4	12	27	5	DNF-14	DNF-5	DNF-10	DNE	DNE	DNE	DNF-20
Stages won	3	0	1	0	0	1	1	0	0	—	—	—	0
Mountains classification	3	3	3	3	7	3	NR	NR	NR	—	—	—	NR
Points classification	N/A	N/A	N/A	N/A	N/A	N/A	NR	NR	NR	—	—	—	NR
Vuelta a España	DNE	DNE	N/A	DNE	N/A	N/A	N/A	N/A	DNE	DNE	DNE	DNE	DNE
Stages won	—	—	N/A	—	N/A	N/A	N/A	N/A	—	—	—	—	—
Mountains classification	—	—	N/A	—	N/A	N/A	N/A	N/A	—	—	—	—	—
Points classification	N/A	N/A	N/A	N/A	N/A	N/A	N/A	N/A	—	—	—	—	—

Legend
1	Winner
2–3	Top three-finish
4–10	Top ten-finish
11–	Other finish
DNE	Did not enter
DNF-x	Did not finish (retired on stage x)
DNS-x	Did not start (not started on stage x)
HD-x	Finished outside time limit (occurred on stage x)
DSQ	Disqualified
N/A	Race/classification not held
NR	Not ranked in this classification
