= Tino Ausenda =

Italian cyclist

Personal information
- Born: 16 May 1919 Brivio, Italy
- Died: 7 February 1976 (aged 56) Brivio, Italy

Cycling career
- Sport: Cycling
- Role: Rider

Tino Ausenda (16 May 1919 – 7 February 1976) was an Italian racing cyclist. He rode in the 1949 Tour de France.
