= Albert Dolhats =

French cyclist

Personal information
- Born: 18 February 1921 Villefranque, France
- Died: 25 November 2009 (aged 88) Tarnos, France

Cycling career
- Sport: Cycling
- Role: Rider

Albert Dolhats (18 February 1921 – 25 November 2009) was a French racing cyclist. He rode in the 1949 Tour de France.
