= Pierre Chany =

French cycling journalist

- Born: 16 December 1922; Langeac, France
- Died: 18 June 1996 (aged 73); Paris, France
- Other name: Jacques Périllat (pen name)
- Occupation: Sports journalist

Pierre Chany (French pronunciation: [pjɛʁ ʃani]; 16 December 1922 – 18 June 1996) was a French cycling journalist. He covered the Tour de France 49 times and was for a long time the main cycling writer for the daily newspaper, L'Équipe.

== Biography ==
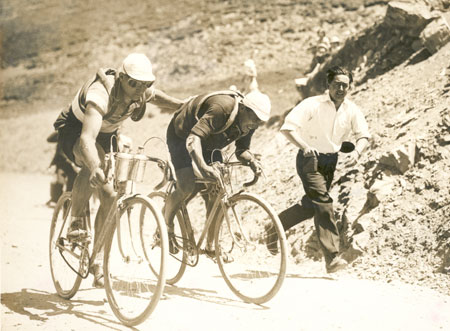
1933: André Leducq, helped (left) by Georges Speicher.

Chany was born in Langeac, Haute-Loire, the son of a near-illiterate father who worked in the horse industry. The family then moved to Paris, to run a small bar in the rue Guillaume Bertrand, in the 11th arrondissement. Chany grew up there and, in his teens, escaped from the city on his bicycle, sometimes riding as far as Melun. He became interested in cycle-racing after reading L'Auto, Paris-Soir and Match and looking at sepia pictures of riders such as André Leducq. He rode several races, including the Premier Pas Dunlop event which in other years showed the talent of young riders such as Louison Bobet and Raphaël Géminiani. In Chanaleilles, he won a cycle and a running race on the same day, winning two packets of Gauloises cigarettes. After that he joined the CV des Marchés club in Paris.

He raced for five years and then, in 1942 when he was 20, went into hiding rather than be sent to Germany as a worker.

He was arrested and jailed first at Puy-en-Velay and then Riom. He escaped - on his birthday - from a train taking him to Germany. He joined a branch of the Resistance, the Francs-Tireurs et Partisans, then joined an Algerian regiment. He was wounded three times and awarded the Croix de Guerre.

The war ended his aspirations as a cyclist and he turned to sports reporting, having briefly tried the transport business in buying two army lorries with a friend, Jacques Michelon. Encourage by another friend, Stanilas Gara, he wrote his first pieces, in 1946, for an agency which sold articles to La Marseillaise among others. It was in La Marseillaise that his first writing appeared. He then took a job with Front National, a Resistance publication edited by Jacques Debu-Bridel. He was to replace Albert Baker d'Isy (1906–1968), an author and one of France's best-known contemporary writers. Baker d'Isy was already Chany's hero and the move brought them together for the first time and led to a lifelong friendship.

From there Chany moved to Sport and to Ce Soir, publications associated with the Communist Party but which employed journalists of various opinions. It was when Ce Soir went out of business in 1953 that he joined L'Équipe. He was head of cycling there from 1953 to 1987.

He also wrote under the pen name Jacques Périllat for 'Miroir Sprint and 'Miroir du Cyclisme'. Chany insisted that L'Équipe's editor, Jacques Goddet, knew Chany was doing it but chose to say nothing rather than lose his leading cycling writer.

== Cycling writer ==
Pierre Chany wrote not only journalistic pieces but numerous other works, including books of cycling history which went to several new editions. He wrote a history of the Tour de France and then of the cycling classics and the world championships. He wrote a history of all cycle racing from the days of the first bicycle to his death in 1996. From 1974, he produced a roundup of each season, called L'Année du Cyclisme. He wrote biographies of Fausto Coppi and Jacques Anquetil and a novel called Une Longue Échappée - A Long Break, a reference to a group of cyclists breaking away from the main field.

Chany received the Prix Martini in 1967 for the best sports article of the year and the Grand Prix of Sporting Literature in 1972 for his work on the Tour de France.

Jacques Anquetil said of the insight of Chany's journalism: "Don't ask me to tell you what happened during the race. There's someone more competent than I am to do that... Even I will wait until tomorrow's article by Pierre Chany in L'Équipe to find what I did, why and how I did it. What gives him authority is that he is competent, that he knows me and understands me. His version will be better than mine and it will become mine."

The Prix Pierre Chany is now awarded each year to the writer of the season's best cycling work in French. It was established in 1989. It was awarded in 2008 to Philippe Bouvet for an article about the Carrefour de l'Arbre, a section of cobbles in Paris–Roubaix.

A cyclo-sportive race is held in Chany's name in Haute-Loirehim.

== "The Man of 50 Tours" ==
Pierre Chany sat through a succession of interviews with the writer Christophe Penot, who planned to publish them under the title Pierre Chany, l'homme aux 50 Tours de France. Chany would have followed his 50th Tour in 1996. He attended the Classique des Alpes, won by Laurent Jalabert on 1 June and then next day went to the prologue of the Critérium du Dauphiné Libéré. There he fell ill. He died of pleurisy on 18 June. By then production of the book was in progress and the author and the publisher, Éditions Cristel, kept the name in homage.

Among those at his funeral was the former professional and radio and television commentator, Robert Chapatte. It proved his last appearance in public and he died in Paris shortly afterwards.

L'Équipe said of Chany the day after his death: "Our newspaper has lost one of those who made his own history: sports journalism has lost one of its masters."

== Bibliography ==
- Les rendez-vous du cyclisme, ou Arriva Coppi (1960)
- Anquetil (1971)
- La Fabuleuse histoire du Tour de France (1985)
- La fabuleuse histoire du cyclisme (1988)
- L'Année du cyclisme (1974)
