= Jean Blanc (cyclist) =

French cyclist

Personal information
- Born: 3 December 1918 Cébazat, France
- Died: 15 November 1999 (aged 80) Cébazat, France

Cycling career
- Sport: Cycling
- Role: Rider

Jean Blanc (3 December 1918 – 15 November 1999) was a French racing cyclist. He rode in the 1949 Tour de France.
