= Bruno Pasquini =

Italian cyclist

Personal information
- Born: 23 November 1914 Massa e Cozzile, Italy
- Died: 12 August 1995 (aged 80) Montecatini Terme, Italy

Cycling career
- Sport: Cycling
- Role: Rider

Bruno Pasquini (23 November 1914 – 12 August 1995) was an Italian racing cyclist. He rode in the 1948 and 1949 Tour de France.
