= Ferdinand Kübler =

Swiss cyclist

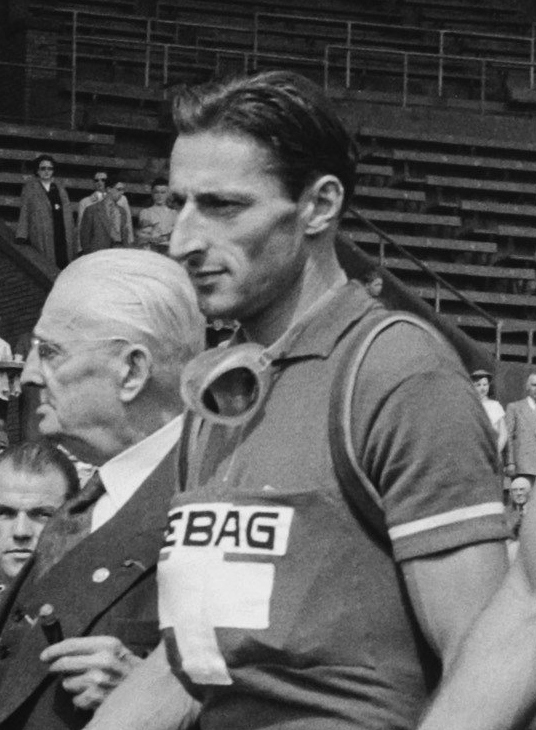
- Kübler at the 1954 Tour de France

Personal information
- Full name: Ferdinand Kübler
- Nicknames: Ferdi; The Cowboy; The Eagle of Adliswil; Mr 100,000 Volts
- Born: 24 July 1919 Marthalen, Canton of Zurich, Switzerland
- Died: 29 December 2016 (aged 97) Zurich, Switzerland

Cycling career
- Sport: Cycling
- Discipline: Road
- Role: Rider
- Rider type: All-rounder

Professional teams
- 1945–1947: Cilo
- 1948–1957: Tebag
- 1948–1949: Peugeot–Dunlop
- 1949: Bartali
- 1949–1952: Fréjus–Pirelli
- 1952–1955: Fiorelli
- 1953–1955: La Perle–Hutchinson
- 1956: Carpano–Coppi

Major wins
- Grand Tours Tour de France General classification (1950) Points classification (1954) 8 individual stages (1947, 1949, 1950, 1954) One-day races and Classics Bordeaux–Paris (1953) Liège–Bastogne–Liège (1951, 1952) La Flèche Wallonne (1951, 1952)
Medal record
Men's road bicycle racing
Representing Switzerland
World Championships
Silver medal – second place	1949 Copenhagen	Elite Men's Road Race
Bronze medal – third place	1950 Moorslede	Elite Men's Road Race
Gold medal – first place	1951 Varese	Elite Men's Road Race

Ferdinand Kübler (pronounced [ˈfɛrdinand ˈkyːblər]; 24 July 1919 – 29 December 2016) was a Swiss cyclist with 71 professional victories, including the 1950 Tour de France and the 1951 World Road Race Championship.

== Biography ==
Kübler was born in Marthalen. He began racing professionally in 1940 but his early career was limited to Switzerland by the Nazi occupation elsewhere. He was multiple Swiss national champion and a three time winner of the Tour de Suisse. Kübler's most successful years in international racing were 1950–1952, when the classics had resumed after the Second World War. He won the La Flèche Wallonne and Liège–Bastogne–Liège, both in 1951 and 1952, in a time when these races were still contested in the same weekend. He was also World Road Race Champion in 1951, having placed second in 1949 and third in 1950.

Kübler rode the Giro d'Italia from 1950–1952, placing fourth once, and third twice. Kübler abandoned the 1947 and 1949 Tours de France, despite an early stage win in each. In the 1950 Tour, he benefited from the absence of Fausto Coppi, sidelined after a crash in the Giro. Overcoming Gino Bartali, Kübler became champion by over nine minutes, also winning three stages. In the 1954 Tour, Kübler won the points jersey and came second behind Louison Bobet.

Kübler was the first Swiss winner of the Tour de France. His biggest rival, Hugo Koblet, won the following year and as of 2021 they are the only riders from Switzerland to win the Tour.

Kübler was a high-spirited and impulsive rider sometimes given to strategically unwise attacks, out of exuberance and competitive drive. He was known as "the cowboy" because of his penchant for Stetson hats. He retired from racing in 1957 at 38.

Kübler died in Zurich on 29 December 2016 at the age of 97. Prior to his death he was the oldest living Tour de France winner.

== Career achievements ==
=== Major results ===
1940
(Switzerland) national pursuit champion
1941
(Switzerland) national pursuit champion
(Switzerland) national mountain champion
1942
(Switzerland) national mountain champion
Tour de Suisse
1943
(Switzerland) national pursuit champion
1945
(Switzerland) national cyclo-cross champion
1947
Tour de France:

Winner stages 1 and 5
Wearing yellow jersey for one day

Paris-Lille
1948
(Switzerland) national road race champion
Tour de Suisse
Tour de Romandie
1949
Tour de France:

Winner stage 5

(Switzerland) national road race champion
1950
Challenge Desgrande-Colombo
Trophée Edmond Gentil
(Switzerland) national road race champion
Tour de France:

:Winner overall classification
Winner stages 6, 10 and 20

1951
(Switzerland) national road race champion
World road champion
Liège–Bastogne–Liège
Tour de Romandie
Flèche Wallonne
Week-end Ardennais
Tour de Suisse
Rome-Naples-Rome
1952
Challenge Desgrande-Colombo
Liège–Bastogne–Liège
Flèche Wallonne
Week-end Ardennais
1953
Bordeaux–Paris
1954
(Switzerland) national road race champion
Challenge Desgrande-Colombo
Tour de France:

2nd place overall classification
Winner stages 5 and 14
Winner points classification

1956
Milan-Turin

=== Grand Tour results timeline ===
	1947	1948	1949	1950	1951	1952	1953	1954	1955
Giro d'Italia	DNE	DNE	DNE	4	3	3	DNF	DNE	DNE
Stages won	—	—	—	0	0	0	0	—	—
Mountains classification	—	—	—	NR	NR	NR	NR	—	—
Points classification	N/A	N/A	N/A	N/A	N/A	N/A	N/A	N/A	N/A
Tour de France	DNF-7	DNE	DNF-18	1	DNE	DNE	DNE	2	DNF-12
Stages won	2	—	1	3	—	—	—	2	0
Mountains classification	NR	—	NR	4	—	—	—	6	17
Points classification	N/A	N/A	N/A	N/A	N/A	N/A	NR	1	NR
Vuelta a España	DNE	DNE	N/A	DNE	N/A	N/A	N/A	N/A	
Stages won	—	—	N/A	—	N/A	N/A	N/A	N/A	
Mountains classification	—	—	N/A	—	N/A	N/A	N/A	N/A	
Points classification	N/A	N/A	N/A	N/A	N/A	N/A	N/A	N/A	

Legend
1	Winner
2–3	Top three-finish
4–10	Top ten-finish
11–	Other finish
DNE	Did not enter
DNF-x	Did not finish (retired on stage x)
DNS-x	Did not start (not started on stage x)
HD-x	Finished outside time limit (occurred on stage x)
DSQ	Disqualified
N/A	Race/classification not held
NR	Not ranked in this classification
