= Jacques Marinelli =

French cyclist (1925–2025)

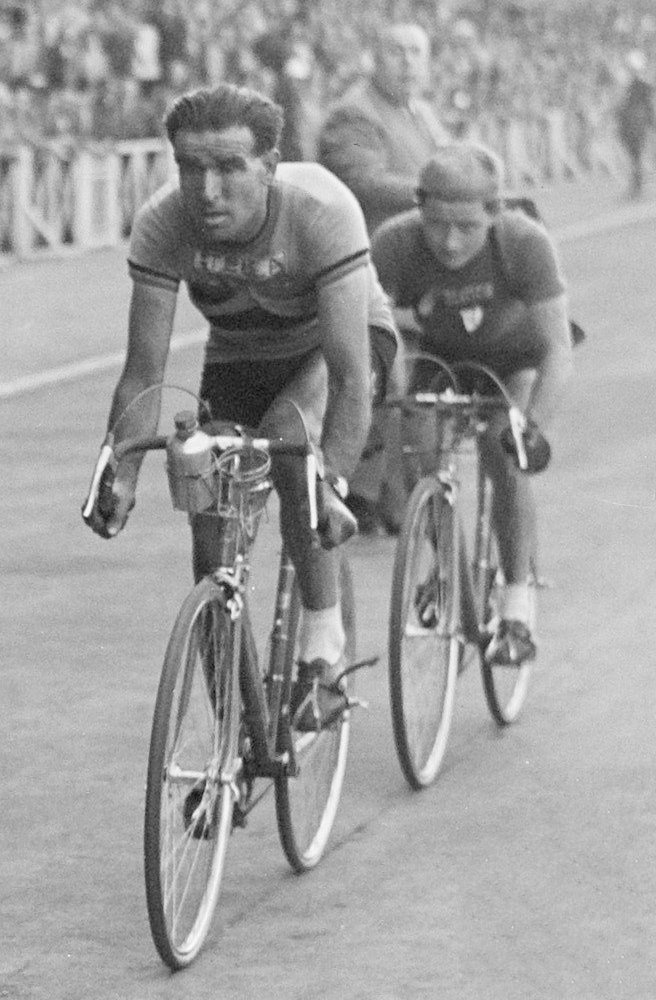
- Marinelli behind Roger Lambrecht at the 1949 Tour de France

Personal information
- Nickname: La perruche (The Parakeet)
- Born: 15 December 1925 Le Blanc-Mesnil, France
- Died: 3 July 2025 (aged 99) Melun, France
- Height: 1.62 m (5 ft 4 in)

Cycling career
- Sport: Cycling
- Discipline: Road
- Role: Rider

Professional teams
- 1948–1951: Alcyon-Dunlop
- 1951: Stucchi
- 1952: Vanoli
- 1953: Peugeot
- 1954: Pschitt
- 1955: Mercier-Hutchinson

Jacques Marinelli (15 December 1925 – 3 July 2025) was a French cyclist. He wore the yellow jersey of leadership for six days in the 1949 Tour de France before finishing third.

== Background ==
Marinelli was born on 15 December 1925 at Le Blanc-Mesnil, north of Paris. The writer Max Favalelli said of Marinelli: "He is a pygmy. His body is no thicker than a propelling pencil, his legs no thicker than runner beans. And his head is like a fist." Marinelli, as an adult, was 1m 62 tall and wore size 38 shoes. He was so thin and sickly-looking as a boy that his mother urged him to play accordion rather than ride a bike. Marinelli nevertheless raced and came to prominence in the Trophées Peugeot. That brought him selection for the 1948 Tour.

Marinelli rode the Tour six times between 1948 and 1954 but finished only in 1949 and in 1952, when he came in 31st. He became the first rider in the Tour to write a column for L'Équipe in 1949.

== Budgerigar in yellow ==
Marinelli became known as la perruche during the 1949 Tour. Riding for the regional Île-de-France team rather than the national team, Marinelli rose above his humble status by attacking repeatedly during the first four days. On the fourth, he came second and became race leader, leading a field that included Fausto Coppi and Gino Bartali. He exchanged the green jersey of the Ile-de-France for the yellow of the leader. Next morning, the organiser, Jacques Goddet, wrote in L'Équipe: "Our budgerigar has been transformed into a canary", a reference to Marinelli's small shape in yellow. The nickname stuck – but "budgerigar" rather than "canary".

Marinelli rode above himself and exploited the rivalry between Coppi and Bartali to keep the lead for another five days, as far as the Pyrenees. Marinelli kept the yellow jersey, although it has now been eaten by moths. He said: "For a great champion to wear the yellow jersey, that's normal. But when it's an amateur that's different, and then again my height, I think that's what contributed to my popularity."

== Later life and death ==
Marinelli stopped racing aged 28, to run a cycle shop and then an electrical-goods shop in the place St-Jean at Melun, in Greater Paris. He then became director of a branch of Conforama, a furniture chain, in the town and ran a company called Marinelli Connexion, which had 150 employees and ran delivery vehicles painted yellow. His was the largest business in the town. He was given the Prix Jean-Claude Killy in 1986 by the Académie des Sports for his success in starting a new life after sport.

Marinelli was elected mayor of Melun in 1989 and again in 1995. He left office in 2001. He was instrumental in bringing the Tour to his town in 1991 and 1998. In 1991, he rode part of the course for the television station FR3.

Marinelli died aged 99, in Melun, France, on 3 July 2025.

== Major results ==
1948
1st place in Hollerich (Lux)
1949
3rd Overall Tour de France

Held after Stages 4–9

1950
Dauphiné Libéré: winner of stages 6 and 7
1st Madrid
1st Paris – Montceau-les-Mines
1954
1st Paris – Montceau-les-Mines
