= Robert Chapatte =

French cyclist and journalist

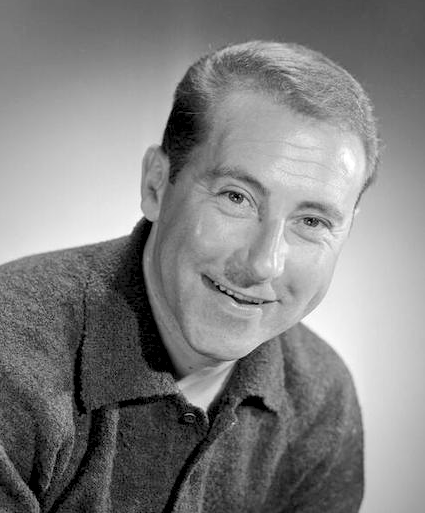
- Born: 14 October 1921; Neuilly-sur-Seine, France
- Died: 19 January 1997 (aged 75); Paris, France
- Occupation: Sports journalist
- Children: Dominique Chapatte
- Awards: Légion d'Honneur

Robert Chapatte (14 October 1921 – 19 January 1997) was a French cyclist and sports journalist, voice of the Tour de France on television and radio and the inventor of Chapatte's Law.

== Racing career ==
Chapatte started cycling at the Vélodrome d'Hiver in Paris, where he became popular with the crowd in madison races. In 1944, he won the amateur team pursuit championship with Roger Riol, Jean Guegen and André Chassang. He was a professional for 11 seasons, from 1944 to 1954. He rode the Tour de France from 1948 to 1952, finishing 16th in 1949. He won the Circuit des Pyrénées in 1949 and the Grand Prix d'Espéraza in 1952. In 1949, riding for France in the Tour de France, he was the first rider to answer a live question on French television.

== Journalism ==
On retirement from cycling, he became a sports writer for L'Aurore and another daily paper, Le Provençal.

In 1955, he provided the commentary for the Tour de l'Ouest on Radio Monte Carlo. A technical error during the race led to his voice going out on a rival network. Engineers switched his commentary to the state channel, ORTF, and that of George Briquet to Radio Monte Carlo. The incident forged a friendship between the two men and Briquet was able to bring Chapatte to ORTF. He stayed there until 1959 and then moved to television. There he stayed until 1968, when he became one of many taken off the air in the shake-up that hit state television after the student riots and other political protests across France in May that year. He returned to radio, working for Europe 1.

Chapatte wrote from the end of his racing career for the sports magazine Miroir Sprint, particularly for its Tour de France issue. In January 1961 he joined the staff of a new monthly, Miroir du Cyclisme, writing "Robert Chapatte's Notebook", but his name vanished from the editorial committee in autumn 1962.

In 1975 he returned to television as head of sport at Antenne 2. He created the sports analysis programme, Stade 2, which is still broadcast on Antenne 2's successor, France 2. He presented the programme from 1975 to 1985, then became consultant commentator on the Tour de France with a man who eventually followed him as head of sport, Patrick Chêne.

== Chapatte's Law ==
Chapatte's Law was a calculation drawn from his experience as a rider and commentator. It held that it took a group of chasing riders 10 kilometres (6.2 mi) to make a one-minute gain on a lone rider. A sole breakaway with more than a minute for each remaining 10 kilometres (6.2 mi) was therefore likely to win the race. The law is still frequently cited in television and radio commentaries and still holds largely true.

Chapatte held that the minute was precise. Anything less and the break would fail, as when Bjarne Riis was caught a few hundred metres before the line when he held 56 seconds rather than a minute on the Gap stage of the 1993 Tour de France.

Chapatte insisted too that a lone rider with a minute's lead had more chance than a group with a larger lead. While a lone rider would ride hard to the end, a group will ease up to gather breath for the sprint and to watch each other for surprise attacks.

The law has suffered in modern times by committed chases organised by teams to get their sprinters to the front. Chapatte's minute is more likely now to be 90 seconds.

== Death ==
Chapatte covered his last Tour de France in July 1994, abandoning the race in the Pyrenees when he fell ill. "I fell asleep in Lourdes and I woke up in hospital in Paris," he said.

Chapatte fell ill again in 1997. His last appearance in public was to attend the funeral of another veteran cycling journalist, Pierre Chany. Chapatte died in the Pitié-Salpêtrière in Paris at 74. He is buried in the cimetière ancien at Neuilly-sur-Seine.

Chapatte was awarded the Légion d'Honneur.

== Teams ==
- 1945 Génial-Lucifer-Hutchinson
- 1946 Génial-Lucifer
- 1947-1949 Mercier-Magne
- 1950 Olympia-Dunlop
- 1951 Helyett-Hutchinson
- 1952 Vanoli
- 1953-1954 Rochet-Dunlop

== Honors and awards ==
- Knight of the Order of Legion of Honour (1994)
- Knight of the Ordre National du Mérite
