= Pierre Cogan =

French cyclist

Personal information
- Born: 10 January 1914 Auray, France
- Died: 5 January 2013 (aged 98) Auray, France

Cycling career
- Sport: Cycling
- Discipline: Road
- Role: Rider

Pierre Cogan (10 January 1914 – 5 January 2013) was a French professional cyclist who competed between the 1930s and the 1950s.

== Biography ==
A professional from 1935 to 1951, Cogan notably won the Grand Prix de Plouay in 1936 and the Grand Prix des Nations (the unofficial World Time Trail Championship) in 1937. He has the distinction of being among the best of the Tour de France riders both before and after the Second World War. He was the 11th in the 1935 Tour de France and still 7th in 1950. He rode his last Tour de France in 1951 where he finished 19th. Towards the end of his life, Cogan was the oldest Tour de France rider still alive.

His brother Joseph was also a professional road bicycle racer between 1936 and 1942.

Pierre also appeared in the feature-length documentary, "Chasing Legends" about the Tour de France.
