= 1938 Giro di Lombardia =

Race details
- Dates: 23 October 1938
- Stages: 1
- Distance: 232 km (144.2 mi)
- Winning time: 6h 38' 00"

Results
	Winner	Cino Cinelli (ITA)
	Second	Gino Bartali (ITA)
	Third	Osvaldo Bailo (ITA)

The 1938 Giro di Lombardia was the 34th edition of the Giro di Lombardia cycle race and was held on 23 October 1938, over a course of 232 km (144 mi). The race started and finished in Milan. The race was won by the Italian Cino Cinelli, who reached the finish line at an average speed of 34.974 km/h (21.732 mph), preceding his countrymen Gino Bartali and Osvaldo Bailo.

101 cyclists departed from Milan and 60 completed the race.

== General classification ==
Final general classification

Rank	Rider	Team	Time
1	Cino Cinelli (ITA)	Frejus	6h 38' 00"
2	Gino Bartali (ITA)	Legnano	+ 0"
3	Osvaldo Bailo (ITA)	Bianchi	+ 0"
4	Pietro Rimoldi (ITA)	Ganna	+ 0"
5	Diego Marabelli (ITA)	Bianchi	+ 0"
6	Secondo Magni (ITA)	Legnano	+ 0"
=7	Severino Canavesi (ITA)	Gloria–Ambrosiana	+ 0"
=7	Salvatore Crippa (ITA)	Wolsit–Binda	+ 0"
=7	Luigi Macchi (ITA)	Gloria–Ambrosiana	+ 0"
=7	Attilio Masarati (ITA)	Lygie–Settebello	+ 0"
