= 1940 Giro di Lombardia =

Race details
- Dates: 1940
- Stages: 1

Results
	Winner	Gino Bartali (ITA)
	Second	Osvaldo Bailo (ITA)
	Third	Cino Cinelli (ITA)

== General classification ==
Final general classification

Rank	Rider	Team	Time
1	Gino Bartali (ITA)	Legnano	
2	Osvaldo Bailo (ITA)	Gerbi	
3	Cino Cinelli (ITA)	Bianchi	
4	Adolfo Leoni (ITA)	Bianchi	
5	Severino Canavesi (ITA)	Gloria	
6	Enrico Mollo (ITA)	Olympia	
7	Salvatore Crippa (ITA)	Gerbi	
8	Guerrino Tomasoni (ITA)	Binda	
9	Luciano Succi (ITA)	Legnano	
10	Giovanni Valetti (ITA)	Bianchi	
