= 1943 Milan–San Remo =

Race details
- Dates: 19 March 1943
- Stages: 1
- Distance: 281.5 km (174.9 mi)
- Winning time: 8h 06' 00"

Results
	Winner	Cino Cinelli (ITA)	(Bianchi)
	Second	Glauco Servadei (ITA)	(Bianchi)
	Third	Quirino Toccacelli (ITA)	(Olmo)

The 1943 Milan–San Remo was the 36th edition of the Milan–San Remo cycle race and was held on 19 March 1943. The race started in Milan and finished in San Remo. The race was won by Cino Cinelli of the Bianchi team.

== General classification ==
Final general classification

Rank	Rider	Team	Time
1	Cino Cinelli (ITA)	Bianchi	8h 06' 00"
2	Glauco Servadei (ITA)	Bianchi	s.t.
3	Quirino Toccacelli (ITA)	Olmo	s.t.
4	Pierino Favalli (ITA)	Legnano	s.t.
5	Gino Bartali (ITA)	Legnano	s.t.
6	Mario De Benedetti (ITA)	Olmo	s.t.
7	Salvatore Crippa (ITA)	Aquiliano	s.t.
8	Severino Canavesi (ITA)	Gloria	s.t.
=9	Osvaldo Bailo (ITA)	Viscontea	s.t.
=9	Olimpio Bizzi (ITA)	Bianchi	s.t.
