= Giro di Campania =

Race details
- Date: Variable
- Region: Campania, Italy
- English name: Tour of Campania
- Discipline: Road
- Type: One-day race
- Organiser: Campania Regional Government

History
- First edition: 1911
- Editions: 64 (as of 2026)
- First winner: Emanuele Garda (ITA)
- Most wins: Learco Guerra (ITA) (3 wins)
- Most recent: Eric Fagúndez (URU)

The Giro di Campania is a one-day road cycling race held annually in the region of Campania, Italy. The race was revived in 2026 as a category 1.1 event on the UCI Europe Tour, after having not been held since 2001.

== Winners ==
Year	Winner	Second	Third
1911 (Note: This edition contained 2 stages.)	(Italy) Emanuele Garda	(Italy) Angelo Gremo	(Italy) Mario Bonalanza
1912	no race		
1913 (Note: This edition contained 3 stages.)	(Italy) Giseppe Pifferi	(Italy) Ezio Cortesia	(Italy) Umberto Romano
1914–1920	no race		
1921	(Italy) Angelo Gremo	(Italy) Giuseppe Santhià	(Italy) Giacchino Tatta
1922	(Italy) Italiano Lugli	(Italy) Angiolo Marchi	(Italy) Antonio Tecchio
1923–1925	no race		
1926	(Italy) Leonida Frascarelli	(Italy) Battista Giuntelli	(Italy) Raffaele Perna
1927	(Italy) Alberto Temponi	(Italy) Colombo Neri	(Italy) Settimo Innocenti
1928	no race		
1929 (Note: This edition had four stages.)	(Italy) Leonida Frascarelli	(Italy) Battista Giuntelli	(Italy) Raffaele Di Paco
1930	no race		
1931 (Note: This edition had 4 stages.)	(Italy) Luigi Barral	(Italy) Francesco Camusso	(Italy) Enrico Eboli
1932	(Italy) Learco Guerra	(Italy) Alfredo Binda	(Italy) Michele Mara
1933	no race		
1934	(Italy) Learco Guerra	(Italy) Mario Cipriani	(Italy) Joseph Soffietti
1935	(Italy) Learco Guerra	(Italy) Giuseppe Olmo	(Italy) Giuseppe Martano
1936–1937	no race		
1938 (Note: This edition had 2 stages.)	(Italy) Giuseppe Olmo	(Italy) Vasco Bergamaschi	(Italy) Learco Guerra
1939	(Italy) Cino Cinelli	(Italy) Gino Bartali	(Italy) Pietro Rimoldi
1940	(Italy) Gino Bartali	(Italy) Pietro Rimoldi	(Italy) Osvaldo Bailo
1941	(Italy) Olimpio Bizzi	(Italy) Mario De Benedetti	(Italy) Osvaldo Bailo
1942	(Italy) Pierino Favalli	(Italy) Antonio Bevilacqua	(Italy) Vasco Bergamaschi
1943–1944	no race		
1945	(Italy) Gino Bartali	(Italy) Primo Volpi	(Italy) Quirino Toccacelli
1946–1947	no race		
1948	(Italy) Luciano Maggini	(Italy) Vito Ortelli	(Italy) Severino Canavesi
1949–1951	no race		
1952	(Italy) Giuseppe Minardi	(Italy) Nino Defilippis	(Italy) Luciano Frosini
1953	(Italy) Adolfo Grosso	(Italy) Loretto Petrucci	(Italy) Fiorenzo Magni
1954	(Italy) Fausto Coppi	(Italy) Michele Gismondi	(France) Bernard Gauthier
1955	(Italy) Fausto Coppi	(Italy) Fiorenzo Magni	(Italy) Giancarlo Astrua
1956	(Italy) Angelo Conterno	(Italy) Giancarlo Astrua	(Italy) Gastone Nencini
1957	(Italy) Giorgio Albani	(Italy) Michele Gismondi	(Italy) Gastone Nencini
1958	(Italy) Alfredo Sabbadin	(Italy) Nello Fabbri	(Italy) Guido Carlesi
1959	(Italy) Rino Benedetti	(Italy) Bruno Monti	(Italy) Pierino Baffi
1960	(Italy) Dino Liviero	(Italy) Gastone Nencini	(Italy) Pierino Baffi
1961	(Italy) Livio Trapè	(Italy) Noè Conti	(Italy) Pierino Baffi
1962	(Italy) Silvano Ciampi	(Belgium) Jos Hoevenaers	(Italy) Vincenzo Meco
1963	(Italy) Adriano Durante	(Italy) Pierino Baffi	(Italy) Vittorio Casati
1964	(Italy) Vito Taccone	(Italy) Italo Zilioli	(Italy) Michele Dancelli
1965	(Italy) Michele Dancelli	(Italy) Roberto Poggiali	(Italy) Gianni Motta
1966	(Italy) Guido De Rosso	(France) Jacques Anquetil	(Italy) Luciano Sambi
1967	(Italy) Dino Zandegù	(Italy) Vittorio Adorni	(West Germany) Rudi Altig
1968	(Italy) Italo Zilioli	(Italy) Franco Bitossi	(Italy) Ugo Colombo
1969	(Italy) Marino Basso	(Italy) Flaviano Vicentini	(Italy) Wladimiro Panizza
1970	(Italy) Franco Bitossi	(Italy) Gianfranco Bianchin	(Italy) Giancarlo Polidori
1971	(Italy) Claudio Michelotto	(Belgium) Patrick Sercu	(Italy) Marino Basso
1972	(Italy) Franco Bitossi	(Italy) Italo Zilioli	(Italy) Marcello Bergamo
1973	no race		
1974	(Italy) Marcello Bergamo	(Italy) Wladimiro Panizza	(Italy) Enrico Paolini
1975	(Italy) Giancarlo Bellini	(Italy) Wladimiro Panizza	(Italy) Constantino Conti
1976	(Belgium) Rik Van Linden	(Italy) Marino Basso	(Belgium) Roger De Vlaeminck
1977 (Note: Held as the Italian National Road Race Championships.)	(Italy) Enrico Paolini	(Italy) Marcello Bergamo	(Italy) Francesco Moser
1978	(Italy) Giuseppe Saronni	(Italy) Wladimiro Panizza	(Italy) Vittorio Algeri
1979	(Italy) Piermattia Gavazzi	(Italy) Giuseppe Saronni	(Italy) Francesco Moser
1980	(Italy) Giuseppe Saronni	(Italy) Pierino Gavazzi	(Italy) Silvano Contini
1981	(Italy) Leonardo Mazzantini	(Italy) Giovanni Mantovani	(Italy) Francesco Moser
1982	(Italy) Francesco Moser	(Italy) Vittorio Algeri	(Italy) Wladimiro Panizza
1983	(Italy) Francesco Moser	(Italy) Gianbattista Baronchelli	(Italy) Mario Noris
1984	(Belgium) Roger De Vlaeminck	(Norway) Dag Erik Pedersen	(Switzerland) Jürg Bruggmann
1985	(Italy) Daniele Caroli	(Italy) Moreno Argentin	(Italy) Silvestro Milani
1986	(Germany) Rolf Gölz	(Italy) Roberto Visentini	(Italy) Pierino Gavazzi
1987	(Italy) Giuseppe Petito	(Italy) Maurizio Rossi	(Italy) Alessandro Paganessi
1988	(Italy) Adriano Baffi	(Italy) Angelo Canzonieri	(Italy) Maurizio Fondriest
1989	(Italy) Luciano Rabbottini	(Italy) Franco Ballerini	(Italy) Alberto Volpi
1990	(Italy) Franco Ballerini	(Italy) Stefano Colagè	(Italy) Antonio Fanelli
1991	(Italy) Dario Nicoletti	(Italy) Danilo Gioia	(Italy) Dario Mariuzzo
1992	(Italy) Davide Cassani	(Italy) Franco Ballerini	(Italy) Maurizio Fondriest
1993	(Italy) Stefano Della Santa	(Venezuela) Leonardo Sierra	(Moldova) Andrei Tchmil
1994–1999	no race		
2000	(Italy) Dario Frigo	(Italy) Oscar Cavagnis	(Italy) Rodolfo Massi
2001	(Russia) Dimitri Konyshev	(Italy) Biagio Conte	(Italy) Alberto Ongarato
2002–2025	no race		
2026	(Uruguay) Eric Fagúndez	(France) Alexandre Delettre	(Ukraine) Andrii Ponomar
