= 1939 Giro di Lombardia =

Race details
- Dates: 1939
- Stages: 1

Results
	Winner	Gino Bartali (ITA)
	Second	Adolfo Leoni (ITA)
	Third	Salvatore Crippa (ITA)

== General classification ==
Final general classification

Rank	Rider	Team	Time
1	Gino Bartali (ITA)	Legnano	
2	Adolfo Leoni (ITA)	Bianchi	
3	Salvatore Crippa (ITA)	Wolsit	
4	Osvaldo Bailo (ITA)	Bianchi	
5	Guerrino Tomasoni (ITA)	Frejus	
6	Olimpio Bizzi (ITA)	Frejus	
7	Severino Canavesi (ITA)	Gloria	
8	Secondo Magni (ITA)	Legnano	
9	Giauco Servadei (ITA)	Ganna	
10	Aimone Landi (ITA)	Lygie	
