= 1935 Giro di Lombardia =

Race details
- Dates: 20 October 1935
- Stages: 1
- Distance: 238 km (147.9 mi)

Results
	Winner	Enrico Mollo (ITA)
	Second	Aldo Bini (ITA)
	Third	Gino Bartali (ITA)

The 1935 Giro di Lombardia was the 31st edition of the race. It was held on 20 October 1935, with contestants riding a total route of 238 km. It was won by the Italian Enrico Mollo, reached the finish line with the time of 7h22 ' 16 "at an average of 32.288 km/h, preceding the countrymen Aldo Bini and Gino Bartali.

64 cyclists took off from Milan and 32 of them completed the race.

== Development ==
Mollo won this edition of the Giro of Lombardy culminating a solo escape originated in the first ascent of the day-mount Guello (km. 40). Bartali passed very close to him by the top but decided to wait for his companions thinking about the Italian championship, which was also decided in this test. This circumstance favored Mollo which by Grantola had more than eight minutes. A sufficient advantage to win the competition despite suffering in the last ascent to Brinzio.

== General classification ==
=== Final general classification ===
Rank	Rider	Team	Time
1	Enrico Mollo (ITA)	Gloria	7h22 ' 16 "
2	Aldo Bini (ITA)	Maino–Girardengo	
3	Gino Bartali (ITA)	Fréjus	
4	Giuseppe Olmo (ITA)	Bianchi	
5	Attilio Masarati (ITA)	Ganna	
6	Rinaldo Gerini (ITA)	Maino–Girardengo	
7	Francesco Camusso (ITA)	Legnano–Wolsit	
8	Isidoro Piubellini (ITA)	Legnano–Wolsit	
9	Mario Cipriani (ITA)	Fréjus	
10	Pietro Rimoldi (ITA)	Bianchi	
