= 1939 Milan–San Remo =

Race details
- Dates: 19 March 1939
- Stages: 1
- Distance: 281.5 km (174.9 mi)
- Winning time: 7h 31' 46"

Results
	Winner	Gino Bartali (ITA)	(Legnano)
	Second	Aldo Bini (ITA)	(Bianchi)
	Third	Alfredo Bovet (ITA)	(Bianchi)

The 1939 Milan–San Remo was the 32nd edition of the Milan–San Remo cycle race and was held on 19 March 1939. The race started in Milan and finished in San Remo. The race was won by Gino Bartali of the Legnano team.

== General classification ==
Final general classification

Rank	Rider	Team	Time
1	Gino Bartali (ITA)	Legnano	7h 31' 46"
2	Aldo Bini (ITA)	Bianchi	s.t.
3	Osvaldo Bailo (ITA)	Bianchi	s.t.
4	Pietro Chiappini (ITA)	Maino	s.t.
5	Mario Vicini (ITA)	Lygie	s.t.
6	Mario Ricci (ITA)	Maino	+ 2' 11"
7	Cino Cinelli (ITA)	Frejus	+ 2' 25"
8	Pierino Favalli (ITA)	Legnano	s.t.
9	Adriano Vignoli (ITA)	Lygie	+ 3' 09"
10	Glauco Servadei (ITA)	Ganna	+ 4' 14"
