= 1941 Giro di Lombardia =

Race details
- Dates: 1941
- Stages: 1

Results
	Winner	Mario Ricci (ITA)
	Second	Cino Cinelli (ITA)
	Third	Severino Canavesi (ITA)

== General classification ==
Final general classification

Rank	Rider	Team	Time
1	Mario Ricci (ITA)	Legnano	
2	Cino Cinelli (ITA)	Bianchi	
3	Severino Canavesi (ITA)	Gloria	
4	Domenico Pedevilla (ITA)	Olmo	
5	Fausto Coppi (ITA)	Bianchi	
6	Pietro Chiappini (ITA)	Olympia	
7	Guerrino Tomasoni (ITA)	Frejus	
8	Olimpio Bizzi (ITA)	Bianchi	
9	Gino Bartali (ITA)	Legnano	
10	Vasco Bergamaschi (ITA)	Bianchi	
