= 1939 Giro d'Italia =

Race details
- Dates: 28 April - 18 May 1939
- Stages: 17, including two split stages
- Distance: 3,011.4 km (1,871 mi)
- Winning time: 88h 02' 00"

Results
Jersey awarded to the overall winner	Winner	Giovanni Valetti (ITA)	(Fréjus)
	Second	Gino Bartali (ITA)	(Legnano)
	Third	Mario Vicini (ITA)	(Lygie)
	Mountains	Gino Bartali (ITA)	(Legnano)
	Team	Fréjus	

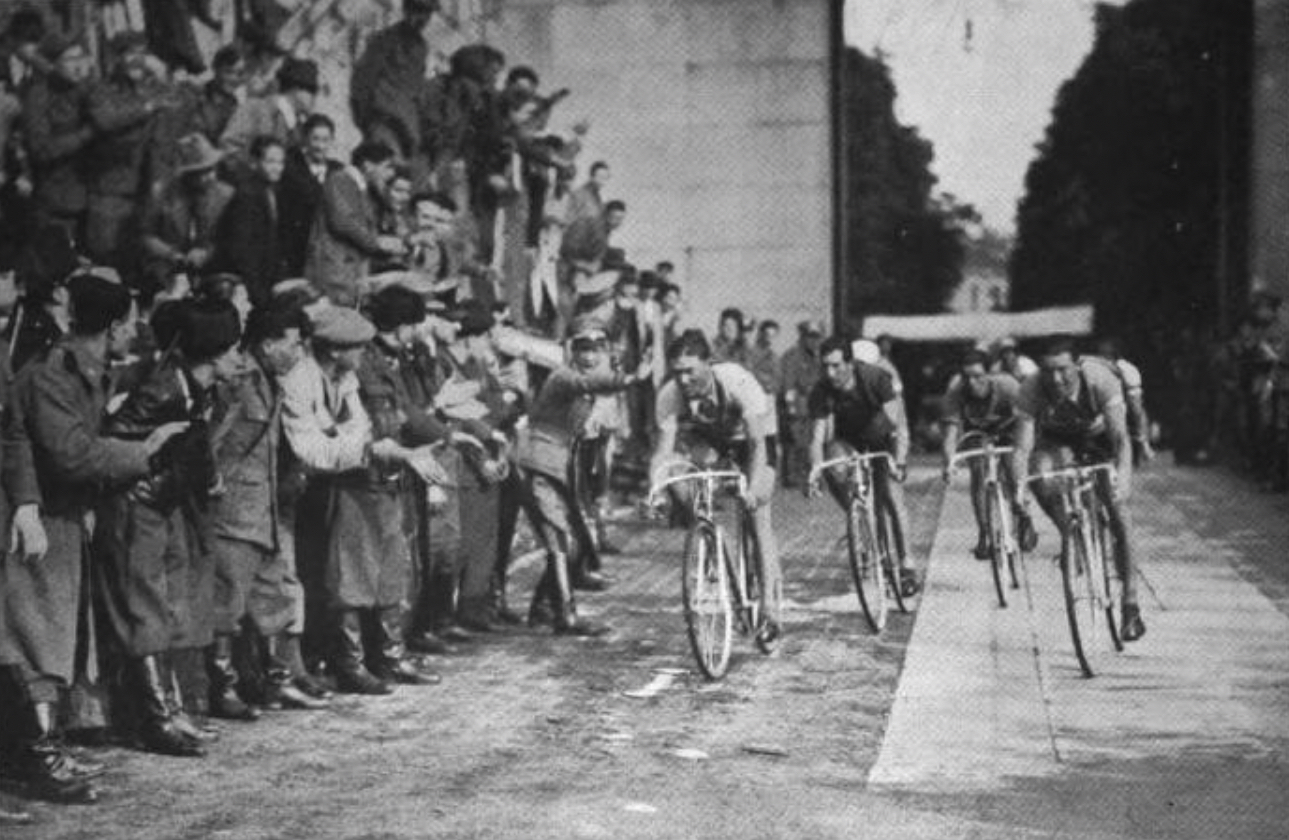
Picture of the Giro d’Italia in 1939

The 1939 Giro d'Italia was the 27th edition of the Giro d'Italia, organized and sponsored by the newspaper La Gazzetta dello Sport. The race began on 28 April in Milan with a stage that stretched 182 km (113 mi) to Turin, finishing back in Milan on 18 May after a split stage and a total distance covered of 3,011.4 km (1,871 mi). The race was won by the Italian rider Giovanni Valetti of the Fréjus team, with fellow Italians Gino Bartali and Mario Vicini coming in second and third respectively.

Valetti had the lead halfway the race. Bartali then took over the lead in the mountains, but Valetti took it back in the penultimate stage. Bartali attacked on the last stage, but Valetti stayed in his wake and won the race.

== Participants ==
Of the 89 riders that began the Giro d'Italia on 28 April, 54 of them made it to the finish in Milan on 18 May. Riders were allowed to ride as a member of a team or group; 56 riders competed as part of a team, while the remaining 33 competed as a part of a group. The eight teams that partook in the race were: Bianchi, Fréjus, Ganna, Gloria, Legnano, Lygie, Olympia, and Belgium. The teams ranged from six to eight riders each. There were also seven groups, made up of three to five riders each, that participated in the race. Those groups were: U.S. Azzini, Dopolavoro Di Novi, S.S. Genova 1913, Il Littoriale, La Voce Di Mantova, U.C. Modenese, and S.C. Vigor.

The peloton was composed primarily of Italian riders. The field featured three former Giro d'Italia winners with two-time winner Gino Bartali, Vasco Bergamaschi who won the 1935 edition, and reigning champion Giovanni Valetti. Other notable Italian riders included Olimpio Bizzi, Ezio Cecchi, and Cino Cinelli.

== Route and stages ==
Stage characteristics and winners
Stage	Date	Course	Distance	Type (Note: In 1939, there was no distinction in the rules between plain stages and mountain stages; the icons shown here indicate that the stages 7, 9b, 10, 14, 15, 16, and 17 included mountains counting towards the mountains classification. The stage 6b individual time trial also contained a summit finish to Monte Terminillo.)	Winner
1	28 April	Milan to Turin	180 km (112 mi)	Plain stage	Vasco Bergamaschi (ITA)
2	29 April	Turin to Genoa	226.7 km (141 mi)	Plain stage	Gino Bartali (ITA)
3	30 April	Genoa to Pisa	187 km (116 mi)	Plain stage	Cino Cinelli (ITA)
4	1 May	Pisa to Grosseto	154 km (96 mi)	Plain stage	Carmine Saponetti (ITA)
5	2 May	Grosseto to Rome	222 km (138 mi)	Plain stage	Olimpio Bizzi (ITA)
	3 May	Rest day			
6a	4 May	Rome to Rieti	85.7 km (53 mi)	Plain stage	Carmine Saponetti (ITA)
6b	4 May	Rieti to Monte Terminillo	14 km (9 mi)	Individual time trial	Giovanni Valetti (ITA)
7	5 May	Rieti to Pescara	191.3 km (119 mi)	Stage with mountain(s)	Adolfo Leoni (ITA)
8	6 May	Pescara to Senigallia	177 km (110 mi)	Plain stage	Diego Marabelli (ITA)
9a	7 May	Senigallia to Forlì	116.5 km (72 mi)	Plain stage	Glauco Servadei (ITA)
9b	7 May	Forlì to Florence	106.6 km (66 mi)	Stage with mountain(s)	Gino Bartali (ITA)
	8 May	Rest day			
10	9 May	Florence to Bologna	120 km (75 mi)	Stage with mountain(s)	Olimpio Bizzi (ITA)
11	10 May	Bologna to Venezia	231.8 km (144 mi)	Plain stage	Pietro Chiappini (ITA)
12	11 May	Venezia to Trieste	173.8 km (108 mi)	Plain stage	Giordano Cottur (ITA)
	12 May	Rest day			
13	13 May	Trieste to Gorizia	39.8 km (25 mi)	Individual time trial	Giovanni Valetti (ITA)
14	14 May	Gorizia to Cortina d'Ampezzo	195 km (121 mi)	Stage with mountain(s)	Secondo Magni (ITA)
15	15 May	Cortina d'Ampezzo to Trento	256.2 km (159 mi)	Stage with mountain(s)	Gino Bartali (ITA)
	16 May	Rest day			
16	17 May	Trento to Sondrio	166 km (103 mi)	Stage with mountain(s)	Giovanni Valetti (ITA)
17	18 May	Sondrio to Milan	168 km (104 mi)	Stage with mountain(s)	Gino Bartali (ITA)
	Total		3,011.4 km (1,871 mi)		

== Classification leadership ==
The leader of the general classification – calculated by adding the stage finish times of each rider – wore a pink jersey. This classification is the most important of the race, and its winner is considered as the winner of the Giro. There were no time bonuses in 1939.

There was a special classification for the grouped riders, calculated in the same way as the general classification. The leader of this classification was given the white jersey. In 1939, three stages were won by grouped riders: stages 4 and 6 by Saponetti from La Voce di Mantova, and stage 13 by Chiappini from Il Littoriale.

In the mountains classification, the race organizers selected different mountains that the route crossed and awarded points to the five riders who crossed them first.

The winner of the team classification was determined by adding the finish times of the best three cyclists per team together and the team with the lowest total time was the winner. If a team had fewer than three riders finish, they were not eligible for the classification. The group classification was decided in the same manner, but the classification was exclusive to the competing groups.

The rows in the following table correspond to the jerseys awarded after that stage was run.

Classification leadership table
Stage	Winner	General classification	Best grouped rider	Mountains classification	Team classification	Group classification
1	Vasco Bergamaschi	Vasco Bergamaschi	Serafino Santambrogio	not awarded	shared	S.C. Vigor
2	Gino Bartali	Gino Bartali	Settimo Simonini	not awarded	Legnano	S.C. Vigor
3	Cino Cinelli	Cino Cinelli	Settimo Simonini	not awarded	Fréjus	S.C. Vigor
4	Carmine Saponetti	Cino Cinelli	Settimo Simonini	not awarded	Fréjus	La Voce di Mantova
5	Olimpio Bizzi	Cino Cinelli	Settimo Simonini	not awarded	Fréjus	La Voce di Mantova
6a	Carmine Saponetti	Cino Cinelli	Settimo Simonini	not awarded	Fréjus	La Voce di Mantova
6b	Giovanni Valetti	Cino Cinelli	Settimo Simonini	Giovanni Valetti	Fréjus	La Voce di Mantova
7	Adolfo Leoni	Cino Cinelli	Settimo Simonini	Giovanni Valetti & Gino Bartali	Fréjus	S.C. Vigor
8	Diego Marabelli	Cino Cinelli	Settimo Simonini	Giovanni Valetti & Gino Bartali	Fréjus	S.C. Vigor
9a	Glauco Servadei	Secondo Magni	Settimo Simonini	Giovanni Valetti & Gino Bartali	Fréjus	S.C. Vigor
9b	Gino Bartali	Giovanni Valetti	Settimo Simonini	Enrico Mollo	Fréjus	S.C. Vigor
10	Olimpio Bizzi	Giovanni Valetti	Settimo Simonini	Enrico Mollo & Michele Benente	Fréjus	S.C. Vigor
11	Pietro Chiappini	Giovanni Valetti	Settimo Simonini	Enrico Mollo & Michele Benente	Fréjus	S.C. Vigor
12	Giordano Cottur	Giovanni Valetti	Settimo Simonini	Enrico Mollo & Michele Benente	Fréjus	S.C. Vigor
13	Giovanni Valetti	Giovanni Valetti	Settimo Simonini	Enrico Mollo & Michele Benente	Fréjus	S.C. Vigor
14	Secondo Magni	Giovanni Valetti	Settimo Simonini	Gino Bartali	Fréjus	S.C. Vigor
15	Gino Bartali	Gino Bartali	Settimo Simonini	Gino Bartali	Fréjus	S.C. Vigor
16	Giovanni Valetti	Giovanni Valetti	Settimo Simonini	Gino Bartali	Fréjus	S.C. Vigor
17	Gino Bartali	Giovanni Valetti	Settimo Simonini	Gino Bartali	Fréjus	S.C. Vigor
Final		Giovanni Valetti	Settimo Simonini	Gino Bartali	Fréjus	S.C. Vigor

== Final standings ==
Legend
A pink jersey	Denotes the winner of the General classification
White jersey	Denotes the best grouped rider

=== General classification ===
Final general classification (1–10)
Rank	Name	Team	Time
1	Giovanni Valetti (ITA)	Fréjus	88h 02' 00"
2	Gino Bartali (ITA)	Legnano	+ 2' 59"
3	Mario Vicini (ITA)	Lygie	+ 5' 07"
4	Severino Canavesi (ITA)	Gloria	+ 7' 55"
5	Settimo Simonini (ITA)	Il Littoriale	+ 16' 40"
6	Salvatore Crippa (ITA)	Ganna	+ 17' 52"
7	Giordano Cottur (ITA)	Lygie	+ 18' 40"
8	Cesare Del Cancia (ITA)	Ganna	+ 24' 34"
9	Cino Cinelli (ITA)	Fréjus	+ 26' 10"
10	Bernardo Rogora (ITA)	Gloria	+ 27' 40"

=== Group rider classification ===
Final group rider classification (1–10)
Rank	Name	Team	Time
1	Settimo Simonini (ITA)	Il Littoriale	88h 18' 40"
2	Aladino Mealli (ITA)	S.C. Vigor	+ 51' 32"
3	Bruno Pasquini (ITA)	La Voce Di Mantova	+ 1h 09' 31"
4	Spirito Godio (ITA)	S.C. Vigor	+ 1h 15' 39"
5	Primo Zuccotti (ITA)	Dopolavoro Di Novi	+ 2h 02' 49"
6	Lino Marini (ITA)	S.S. Genova 1913	+ 2h 16' 20"
7	Guerrino Amadori (ITA)	La Voce Di Mantova	+ 2h 23' 45"
8	Renzo Silvestri (ITA)	U.C. Modenese	+ 2h 35' 45"
9	Gino Malavasi (ITA)	La Voce Di Mantova	+ 2h 41' 12"
10	Amilcare Amilsano (ITA)	S.C. Vigor	+ 2h 43' 41"

=== Mountains classification ===
Final mountains classification (1–9)
	Name	Team	Points
1	Gino Bartali (ITA)	Legnano	22
2	Giovanni Valetti (ITA)	Fréjus	19
3	Michele Benente (ITA)	Olympia	14
4	Enrico Mollo (ITA)	Olympia	10
4	Settimo Simonini (ITA)	Il Littoriale	10
6	Olimpio Bizzi (ITA)	Fréjus	6
6	Giordano Cottur (ITA)	Lygie	6
6	Secondo Magni (ITA)	Fréjus	6
9	Adolfo Leoni (ITA)	Bianchi	5
9	Aladino Mealli (ITA)	S.C Vigor	5

=== Team classification ===
Final team classification (1–8)
	Team	Time
1	Fréjus	265h 00' 13"
2	Ganna	+ 27' 53"
3	Gloria	+ 29' 52"
4	Lygie	+ 57' 35"
5	Legnano	+ 1h 03' 55"
6	Bianchi	+ 3h 03' 19"
7	Olympia	+ 5h 55' 57"
8	Belgio	+ 9h 11' 50"

=== Group classification ===
Final group classification (1–3)
	Team	Time
1	S.C. Vigor	269h 46' 52"
2	La Voce di Mantova	+ 1h 23' 36"
3	Il Littoriale	+ 4h 20' 42"
