= 1940 Giro d'Italia =

Race details
- Dates: 17 May – 9 June 1940
- Stages: 20
- Distance: 3,574 km (2,221 mi)
- Winning time: 107h 31' 10"

Results
Jersey awarded to the overall winner	Winner	Fausto Coppi (ITA)	(Legnano)
	Second	Enrico Mollo (ITA)	(Fréjus)
	Third	Giordano Cottur (ITA)	(Lygie)
	Mountains	Gino Bartali (ITA)	(Legnano)
	Team	Gloria	

The 1940 Giro d'Italia was the 28th edition of the Giro d'Italia, organized and sponsored by the newspaper La Gazzetta dello Sport. The race began on 17 May 1940 in Milan with a stage that stretched 180 km (112 mi) to Turin, finishing back in Milan on 9 June 1940 after a 180 km (112 mi) stage and a total distance covered of 3,574 km (2,221 mi).

The race was won by Fausto Coppi (at his first participation) of the Legnano team, with fellow Italians Enrico Mollo and Giordano Cottur coming in second and third respectively.

Coppi, who was 20 years old at the time, is the youngest winner of the Giro.

== Participants ==
Of the 91 riders that began the Giro d'Italia on 17 May 1940, 47 of them made it to the finish in Milan on 9 June May. Riders were allowed to ride as a member of a team or group; 41 riders competed as part of a team, while the remaining 50 competed as a part of a group. The eight teams that partook in the race were: Bianchi, Legnano, Gloria, Olympia, Lygie, Gerbi. Each team started with either six or seven riders. The Ganna team did not start the race due to the team's Belgian riders not being cleared to enter the country. There were also seven groups, made up of three to five riders each, that participated in the race. Those groups were: S. C. Binda, G. S. Battisti-Aquilano, U. S. Azzini-Universal, Cicli Viscontea, (Note: Cicli Viscontea was also known as Comando Generale M.V.S.N. or M.V.S.N.-Viscontea.) Dopolavoro Az. Bemberg, U. C. Modenese, Il Littoriale, Dopolavoro Az. Vismara, S. S. Parioli, and G. S. Mater.

The peloton was composed primarily of Italian riders. The field featured two former Giro d'Italia winners with two-time winners Gino Bartali and Giovanni Valetti, who was the reigning champion. Bartali studied the route for the Giro intensely during the winter before the race and during reconnaissance rides, he befriended local business owners with the hopes of contacting for local road and weather conditions during the race. Other notable Italian riders included Olimpio Bizzi, Ezio Cecchi, and Fausto Coppi. The only non-Italian riders to compete in the race were Luxembourgian Christophe Didier and Swiss rider Walter Diggelmann. Bartali and Valetti were both seen a strong contenders for the overall title.

Originally, a team sponsored by Ganna would have joined, formed by mostly Belgian riders. After the German invasion of Belgium, travel became difficult, and these Belgian riders were unable to reach Italy; from this team only Christophe Didier from Luxembourg was able to reach Italy. Didier was then allowed to race as member of the Olympia team, which was short three riders because three Swiss riders were also not able to reach Italy.

== Route and stages ==
Stage characteristics and winners
Stage	Date	Course	Distance	Type (Note: In 1940, there was no distinction in the rules between plain stages and mountain stages; the icons shown here indicate that the tenth, sixteenth, seventeenth, eighteenth, and nineteenth stages included major mountains.)	Winner
1	17 May	Milan to Turin	180 km (112 mi)	Plain stage	Olimpio Bizzi (ITA)
2	18 May	Turin to Genoa	226 km (140 mi)	Plain stage	Pierino Favalli (ITA)
3	19 May	Genoa to Pisa	188 km (117 mi)	Plain stage	Diego Marabelli (ITA)
4	20 May	Pisa to Grosseto	154 km (96 mi)	Plain stage	Adolfo Leoni (ITA)
5	21 May	Grosseto to Rome	224 km (139 mi)	Plain stage	Adolfo Leoni (ITA)
	22 May	Rest day			
6	23 May	Rome to Naples	238 km (148 mi)	Plain stage	Glauco Servadei (ITA)
7	24 May	Naples to Fiuggi	178 km (111 mi)	Plain stage	Walter Generati (ITA)
8	25 May	Fiuggi to Terni	183 km (114 mi)	Plain stage	Olimpio Bizzi (ITA)
9	26 May	Terni to Arezzo	183 km (114 mi)	Plain stage	Primo Volpi (ITA)
10	27 May	Arezzo to Florence	91 km (57 mi)	Stage with mountain(s)	Olimpio Bizzi (ITA)
	28 May	Rest day			
11	29 May	Florence to Modena	184 km (114 mi)	Plain stage	Fausto Coppi (ITA)
12	30 May	Modena to Ferrara	199 km (124 mi)	Plain stage	Adolfo Leoni (ITA)
13	31 May	Ferrara to Treviso	125 km (78 mi)	Plain stage	Olimpio Bizzi (ITA)
14	1 June	Treviso to Abbazia (Yugoslavia)	215 km (134 mi)	Plain stage	Glauco Servadei (ITA)
15	2 June	Abbazia (Yugoslavia) to Trieste	179 km (111 mi)	Plain stage	Mario Vicini (ITA)
	3 June	Rest day			
16	4 June	Trieste to Pieve di Cadore	202 km (126 mi)	Stage with mountain(s)	Mario Vicini (ITA)
17	5 June	Pieve di Cadore to Ortisei	110 km (68 mi)	Stage with mountain(s)	Gino Bartali (ITA)
	6 June	Rest day			
18	7 June	Ortisei to Trento	186 km (116 mi)	Stage with mountain(s)	Glauco Servadei (ITA)
19	8 June	Trento to Verona	149 km (93 mi)	Stage with mountain(s)	Gino Bartali (ITA)
20	9 June	Verona to Milan	180 km (112 mi)	Plain stage	Adolfo Leoni (ITA)
	Total		3,574 km (2,221 mi)		

== Race overview ==
During the second stage, Bartali crashed into a dog that ran onto the road, throwing him from the bike. He returned to his bike, but a doctor examination after finishing the stage, led the diagnosis of a strained muscle and a recommendation to withdraw from the race. Bartali elected to remain the race, but knew he could not win. Bartali's team mate Fausto Coppi, originally selected to help Bartali, finished this stage in second place, and climbed to the second place in the general classification.

Coppi stayed in the top of general classification in the first half of the Giro, although not without problems. In the eighth stage, he had an accident with a car, and his bike was broken. He only lost three minutes, because his team mate Mario Ricci was told to give his bike to Coppi.

After the tenth stage, Coppi was in third place, with only Enrico Mollo and Severino Canavesi in front of him. In the eleventh stage, Coppi attacked on the Abetone, and rode a solo to the finish, winning the stage by almost four minutes, becoming the new race leader. From then on, the Legnano team fully worked for Coppi.

Bartali was fifteen minutes behind in the general classification, and considered abandoning the race. His team director Eberardo Pavesi requested him to stay in the race, to work for the team in case Coppi was unable to stay in the lead. In the sixteenth stage, Coppi was not feeling well, and when the climbing started, had to stop on the side of the road to vomit. When Bartali reached Coppi, Bartali was able to convince Coppi to get back on his bike and ride on. Coppi reached the finish, losing only a few seconds to his closest rival Mollo.

On the seventeenth stage, Coppi was feeling better, and together with Bartali he rode away from all other riders. Coppi had a flat tire twice, and Bartali waited for him both times. When Bartali had a flat tire, Coppi did not wait until he was told to wait by his team director Eberardo Pavesi. Coppi listened and waited for Bartali; they rode to the finish together and Bartali won the stage, while Coppi cemented his lead.

In the final stages, there were no big changes in the general classification, so Coppi became the winner of the 1940 Giro in his first participation, only twenty years old.

== Classification leadership ==
The leader of the general classification – calculated by adding the stage finish times of each rider – wore a pink jersey. This classification is the most important of the race, and its winner is considered as the winner of the Giro. There were no time bonuses in 1940.

There was a special classification for the grouped riders, calculated in the same way as the general classification. The leader of this classification was given the white jersey. In 1940, one stage was won by a grouped rider: stage 3 by Maribelli for GS Battisti.

In the mountains classification, the race organizers selected different mountains that the route crossed and awarded points to the five riders who crossed them first.

The winner of the team classification was determined by adding the finish times of the best three cyclists per team together and the team with the lowest total time was the winner.If a team had fewer than three riders finish, they were not eligible for the classification. The group classification was decided in the same manner, but the classification was exclusive to the competing groups.

The rows in the following table correspond to the jerseys awarded after that stage was run.

Classification leadership table
Stage	Winner	General classification	Best grouped rider	Mountains classification	Team classification	Group classification
1	Vasco Bergamaschi	Olimpio Bizzi	Marcello Spadolini	not awarded	Bianchi	UC Modenese
2	Gino Bartali	Osvaldo Bailo	Fulvio Montini	not awarded	multiple shared	Cicli Viscontea
3	Diego Marabelli	Osvaldo Bailo	Giovanni De Stefanis	not awarded	Legnano	Cicli Viscontea
4	Adolfo Leoni	Pierino Favalli	Giovanni Gotti	not awarded	Gloria	UC Modenese
5	Adolfo Leoni	Pierino Favalli	Giovanni Gotti	not awarded	Gloria	UC Modenese
6	Glauco Servadei	Pierino Favalli	Giovanni Gotti	not awarded	Gloria	Cicli Viscontea
7	Walter Generati	Pierino Favalli	Giovanni Gotti	not awarded	Gloria	Cicli Viscontea
8	Olimpio Bizzi	Enrico Mollo	Giovanni Gotti	not awarded	Gloria	U.S. Azzini-Universal
9	Primo Volpi	Enrico Mollo	Giovanni Gotti	not awarded	Gloria	U.S. Azzini-Universal
10	Olimpio Bizzi	Enrico Mollo	Giovanni Gotti	Primo Volpi	Gloria	U.S. Azzini-Universal
11	Fausto Coppi	Fausto Coppi	Giovanni De Stefanis	Fausto Coppi	Gloria	U.S. Azzini-Universal
12	Adolfo Leoni	Fausto Coppi	Giovanni De Stefanis	Fausto Coppi	Gloria	U.S. Azzini-Universal
13	Olimpio Bizzi	Fausto Coppi	Giovanni De Stefanis	Fausto Coppi	Gloria	U.S. Azzini-Universal
14	Glauco Servadei	Fausto Coppi	Giovanni De Stefanis	Fausto Coppi	Gloria	U.S. Azzini-Universal
15	Mario Vicini	Fausto Coppi	Giovanni De Stefanis	Fausto Coppi	Gloria	U.S. Azzini-Universal
16	Mario Vicini	Fausto Coppi	Giovanni De Stefanis	Fausto Coppi	Gloria	U.S. Azzini-Universal
17	Gino Bartali	Fausto Coppi	Giovanni De Stefanis	Fausto Coppi	Gloria	U.S. Azzini-Universal
18	Glauco Servadei	Fausto Coppi	Giovanni De Stefanis	Gino Bartali & Fausto Coppi	Gloria	U.S. Azzini-Universal
19	Gino Bartali	Fausto Coppi	Giovanni De Stefanis	Gino Bartali	Gloria	U.S. Azzini-Universal
20	Adolfo Leoni	Fausto Coppi	Giovanni De Stefanis	Gino Bartali	Gloria	U.S. Azzini-Universal
Final		Fausto Coppi	Giovanni De Stefanis	Gino Bartali	Gloria	U.S. Azzini-Universal

== Final standings ==
Legend
A pink jersey	Denotes the winner of the General classification
White jersey	Denotes the best grouped rider

=== General classification ===
Final general classification (1–10)
Rank	Name	Team	Time
1	Fausto Coppi (ITA)	Legnano	107h 31' 10"
2	Enrico Mollo (ITA)	Olympia	+ 2' 40"
3	Giordano Cottur (ITA)	Lygie	+ 11' 45"
4	Mario Vicini (ITA)	Bianchi	+ 16' 27"
5	Severino Canavesi (ITA)	Gloria	+ 16' 50"
6	Ezio Cecchi (ITA)	Gloria	+ 22' 30"
7	Walter Generati (ITA)	Gloria	+ 25' 03"
8	Giovanni De Stefanis (ITA)	Dop. Azzini Bamberg	+ 27' 50"
9	Gino Bartali (ITA)	Legnano	+ 46' 09"
10	Settimio Simonini (ITA)	U.S. Azzini-Universal	+ 48' 37"

=== Group rider classification ===
Final group rider classification (1–10)
Rank	Name	Team	Time
1	Giovanni De Stefanis (ITA)	Dop. Azzini Bamberg	107h 59' 00"
2	Settimo Simonini (ITA)	U.S. Azzini-Universal	+ 19' 47"
3	Adriano Vignoli (ITA)	Cicli Viscontea	+ 29' 52"
4	Diego Marabelli (ITA)	G. S. Battisti-Aquilano	+ 37' 28"
5	Cesare Del Cancia (ITA)	Cicli Viscontea	+ 1h 06' 24"
6	Mario De Benedetti (ITA)	Dopolavoro Az. Bemberg	+ 1h 14' 58"
7	Francesco Patti (ITA)	Il Littoriale	+ 1h 18' 03"
8	Primo Volpi (ITA)	U. S. Azzini-Universal	+ 1h 20' 53"
9	Fulvio Montini (ITA)	S. S. Parioli	+ 1h 24' 19"
10	Eduardo Stretti (ITA)	Dopolavoro Az. Vismara	+ 1h 34' 00"

=== Mountains classification ===
Final mountains classification (1–9)
	Name	Team	Points
1	Gino Bartali (ITA)	Legnano	25
2	Fausto Coppi (ITA)	Legnano	21
3	Enrico Mollo (ITA)	Olympia	13
4	Ezio Cecchi (ITA)	Gloria	13
5	Mario Vicini (ITA)	Bianchi	12
6	Giordano Cottur (ITA)	Lygie	7
6	Primo Volpi (ITA)	U.S. Azzini-Universal	7
8	Giovanni De Stefanis (ITA)	Dop. Azzini Bamberg	5
9	Diego Marabelli (ITA)	GS Battisti-Aquilano	2
9	Walter Diggelmann (ITA)	Olympia	2

=== Team classification ===
Final team classification (1–6)
	Team	Time
1	Gloria	306h 14' 23"
2	Legnano	+ 1h 51' 40"
3	Bianchi	+ 3h 30' 57"
4	Gerbi	+ 3h 32' 44"
5	Olympia	+ 3h 33' 18"
6	Lygie	+ 5h 03' 30"

=== Group classification ===
Final group classification (1–4)
	Team	Time
1	U.S. Azzini-Universal	327h 34' 59"
2	Cicli Viscontea	+ 16' 41"
3	Dopolavoro Az. Vismara	+ 33' 41"
4	G.S. Battisti-Aquilano	+ 1h 15' 37"
