= 1933 Giro di Lombardia =

Race details
- Dates: 15 October 1933
- Stages: 1
- Distance: 230 km (142.9 mi)
- Winning time: 7h 02' 44"

Results
	Winner	Domenico Piemontesi (ITA)
	Second	Luigi Barral (ITA)
	Third	Pietro Rimoldi (ITA)

The 1933 Giro di Lombardia was the 29th edition of the Giro di Lombardia cycle race and was held on 15 October 1933, over a course of 230 km (140 mi). The race started and finished in Milan. The race was won by Italian Domenico Piemontesi, who reached the finish line at an average speed of 32.673 km/h (20.302 mph), preceding his compatriots Luigi Barral and Pietro Remoldi.

106 cyclists departed from Milan and 61 of them completed the race.

== Development ==
Canazza and Brambilla escaped in the first kilometres, but were caught and overcome by Piemontesi and Casini. They could not stay with the rhythm of Piemontesi and lost his wheel. Behind, a group of persecution was created, formed by Barral, Rimoldi and Sella who caught Piemontesi before the ascent to Brinzio. The test is decided in this climb, as Rimoldi and Sella are off the hook while Barral and Piemontesi gamble in the final sprint in the arena of Milan, where Piemontesi won.

== General classification ==
Final general classification

Rank	Rider	Team	Time
1	Domenico Piemontesi (ITA)	Gloria	7h 02' 44"
2	Luigi Barral (ITA)	Olympia	+ 0"
3	Pietro Rimoldi (ITA)	Bianchi	+ 6' 00"
4	Nino Sella (ITA)	Olympia	+ 6' 00"
5	Bernardo Rogora (ITA)	Gloria	+ 6' 20"
6	Mario Cipriani (ITA)		+ 6' 20"
7	Giovanni Cazzulani (ITA)		+ 6' 20"
8	Giovanni Firpo (ITA)	Gloria	+ 6' 20"
9	Giuseppe Graglia (LUX)	Bestetti	+ 11' 00"
10	Renato Scorticati (ITA)		+ 11' 00"
