= 1936 Giro di Lombardia =

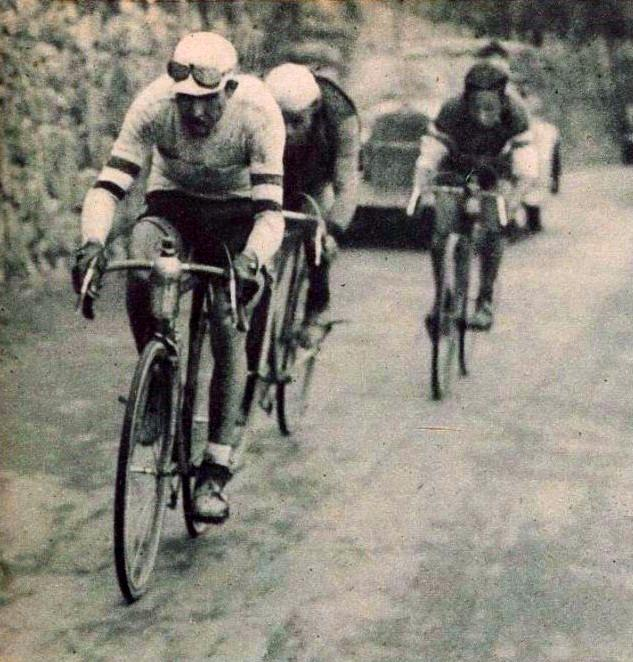
- Gino Bartali claimed his first of three Giro di Lombardia wins in 1936

Race details
- Dates: 8 November 1936
- Stages: 1
- Distance: 241 km (149.8 mi)
- Winning time: 6h 46' 00"

Results
	Winner	Gino Bartali (ITA)
	Second	Diego Marabelli (ITA)
	Third	Luigi Barral (ITA)

The 1936 Giro di Lombardia was the 32nd edition of the Giro di Lombardia cycle race and was held on 8 November 1936. The race started and finished in Milan. The race was won by Gino Bartali of the Legnano team.

== General classification ==
Final general classification

Rank	Rider	Team	Time
1	Gino Bartali (ITA)	Legnano	6h 46' 00"
2	Diego Marabelli (ITA)		+ 0"
3	Luigi Barral (ITA)	Legnano	+ 0"
4	Aldo Bini (ITA)	Bianchi	+ 2' 25"
5	Rinaldo Gerini (ITA)	Frejus	+ 2' 25"
6	Francesco Camusso (ITA)	Legnano	+ 2' 25"
7	Settimio Simonini (ITA)		+ 2' 25"
8	Osvaldo Bailo (ITA)	Legnano	+ 4' 15"
9	Severino Canavesi (ITA)	Ganna	+ 4' 15"
10	Carlo Romanatti (ITA)	Bianchi	+ 4' 15"
