= Gino Bartali =

Italian cyclist (1914–2000)

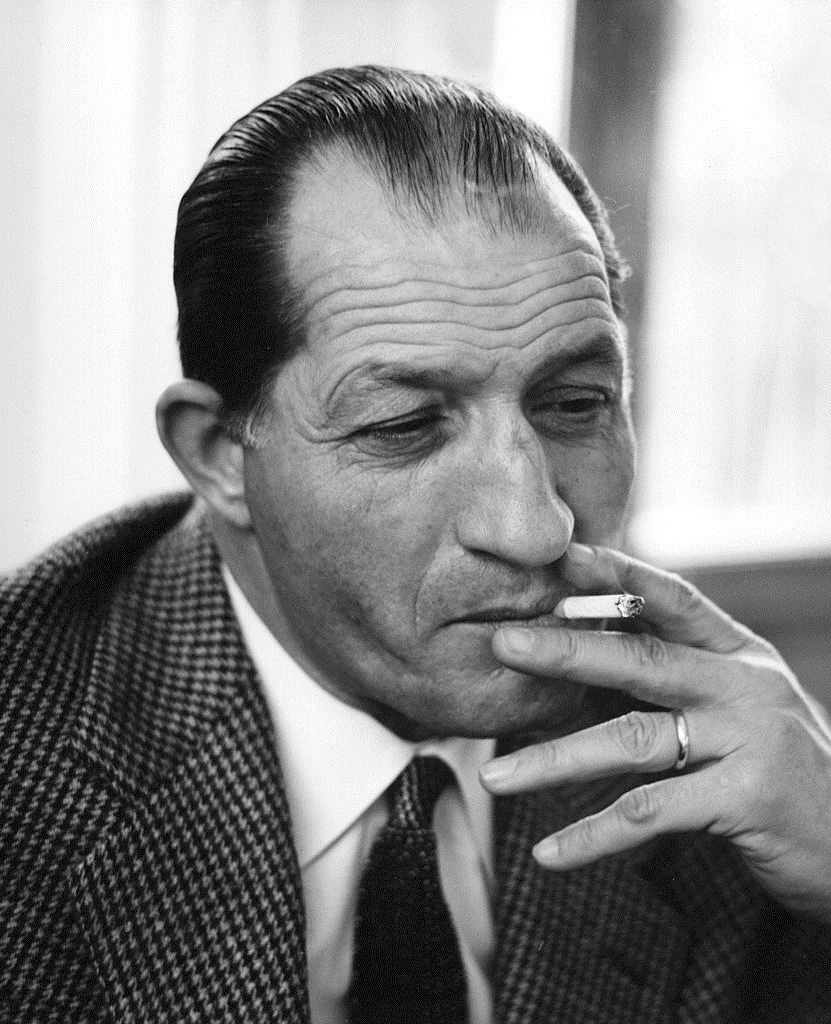
- Bartali in 1963

Personal information
- Full name: Gino Bartali, OMRI
- Nicknames: Gino the Pious; Ginettaccio; L'uomo di ferro (The Iron Man); L'intramontabile (The Timeless)
- Born: 18 July 1914 Ponte a Ema, Florence, Kingdom of Italy
- Died: 5 May 2000 (aged 85) Florence, Italy

Cycling career
- Sport: Cycling
- Discipline: Road
- Role: Rider
- Rider type: Climbing specialist

Amateur team
- 1931–1934: –

Professional teams
- 1935: Fréjus
- 1936–1945: Legnano
- 1946–1947: Tebag and Legnano
- 1948: Legnano
- 1949–50: Bartali–Gardiol
- 1951: Bartali–Ursus
- 1952: Tebag and Bartali
- 1953: Bartali
- 1954: Bartali–Brooklin

Major wins
- Grand Tours Tour de France General classification (1938, 1948) Mountains classification (1938, 1948) 12 individual stages (1937, 1938, 1948, 1949, 1950) Giro d'Italia General classification (1936, 1937, 1946) Mountains classification (1935, 1936, 1937, 1939, 1940, 1946, 1947) 17 individual stages (1935, 1936, 1937, 1939, 1940, 1947, 1950) 1 TTT stage (1937) Stage races Tour of the Basque Country (1935) Tour de Suisse (1946, 1947) Tour de Romandie (1949) One-day races and Classics National Road Race Championships (1935, 1937, 1940, 1952) Giro di Lombardia (1936, 1939, 1940) Milan–San Remo (1939, 1940, 1947, 1950)

Gino Bartali, OMRI (Italian pronunciation: [ˈdʒiːno ˈbartali]; 18 July 1914 – 5 May 2000), nicknamed Gino the Pious and (in Italy) Ginettaccio, was a champion road cyclist. He was the most renowned Italian cyclist before the Second World War, having won the Giro d'Italia twice, in 1936 and 1937, and the Tour de France in 1938. After the war, he added one more victory in each event: the Giro d'Italia in 1946 and the Tour de France in 1948. His second and last Tour de France victory in 1948 gave him the largest gap between victories in the race.

In September 2013, 13 years after his death, Bartali was recognised as a "Righteous Among the Nations" by Yad Vashem for his efforts to aid Jews during World War II.

== Early life and amateur career ==
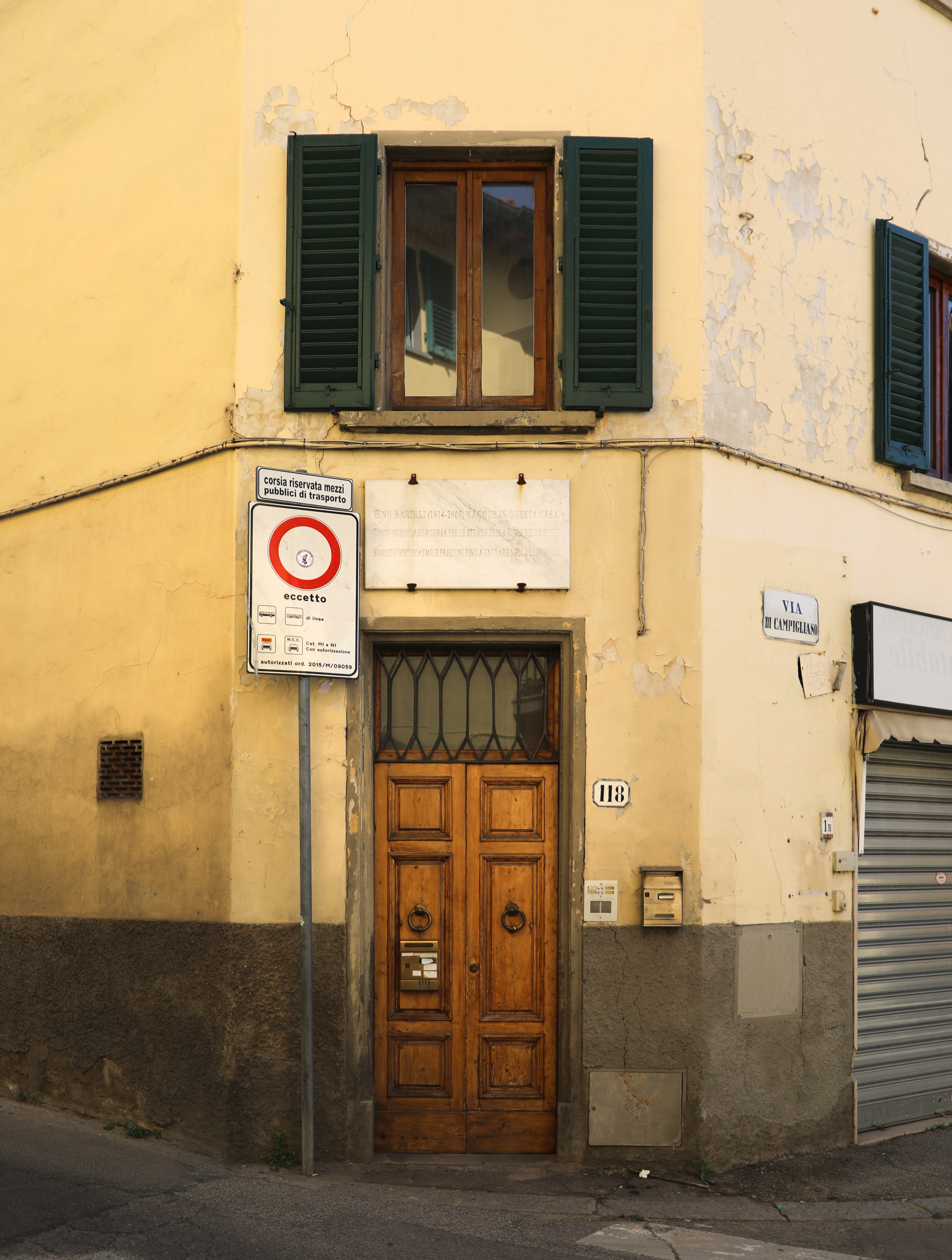
The house where Gino Bartali was born in Ponte a Ema, Florence

Gino Bartali was born in Ponte a Ema, Florence, Italy, the third son of four children of a smallholder, Torello Bartali. He was powerfully built, with a broad nose and a boxer's face. He earned pocket money by selling raffia to makers of covers for wine bottles. He began work in a bicycle shop when he was 13. He started racing at 13, became a promising amateur and turned professional in 1935 when he was 21. He was the Italian champion the next year. On 14 November 1940, Bartali married Adriana Bani in Florence. The wedding was celebrated by Cardinal Dalla Costa and was blessed by Pope Pius XII, to whom Bartali donated a bicycle.

== Professional career ==
Bartali won a stage of the 1935 Giro d'Italia and was King of the Mountains, the first of seven times he won the title in the Giro. He was 20. In 1936, before he turned 22, he won the Giro and the Giro di Lombardia, although his season was marred when his brother, Giulio, died in a racing accident on 14 June. Bartali came close to giving up cycling.

He was persuaded to return and, in 1937, won the Giro again. His reputation outside Italy was that he was yet another Italian who could not ride well outside his country. There was some truth in the claim. The writer Tim Hilton said: "Bartali was essentially an Italian cyclist, a champion who rode within sight of his own people, and was uneasy when the Tour de France travelled north of Paris. He never disputed the northern classics."

Stung by the claim, he rode the Tour de France in 1937. He got off to a bad start, losing more than eight minutes by the third stage and more than ten by the Ballon d'Alsace, a mountain in the Vosges. He took the leader's jersey in Grenoble, with a 1m 14s lead. Later in the race, he and two helpers, Jules Rossi and Francesco Camusso, while crossing a wooden bridge over the river Colau, Rossi skidded, causing Bartali to ride into a parapet and fall into the river.

Roger Lapébie wrote: "In the valley that leads to Briançon, I saw the accident to the maillot jaune, Bartali. The narrow and bumpy road ran along the foot of a rock. Suddenly, Rossi, who was leading, took a bend badly, braked and his back wheel hit the parapet of a bridge. Bartali, who was beside Rossi, couldn't get clear and I saw him fall over the bridge and into the little river three metres below." Camusso pulled him out. Bartali was cut on his arm and knee and had trouble breathing because of a blow to the chest. He rode on to the end of the day, often pushed by his helpers. He finished 10 minutes behind the rest but kept his lead.

He got through the Alps, by then having lost his jersey, and retired in Marseille. In one account, before he dropped out, he notified the organiser, Henri Desgrange, who said: "You are the first rider to come to see me before dropping out. You're a good man [un brave garçon], Gino. We'll see each other again next year and you'll win." However, Bartali later claimed that the Italian Cycling Federation forced him to withdraw, perhaps because of his political opposition to Benito Mussolini's Fascist regime. “When the doctor didn’t want me to race, ‘they’ made me race; when I should have withdrawn, they made me continue; when, after the four difficult stages, I was getting better, they sent me home,” he said.

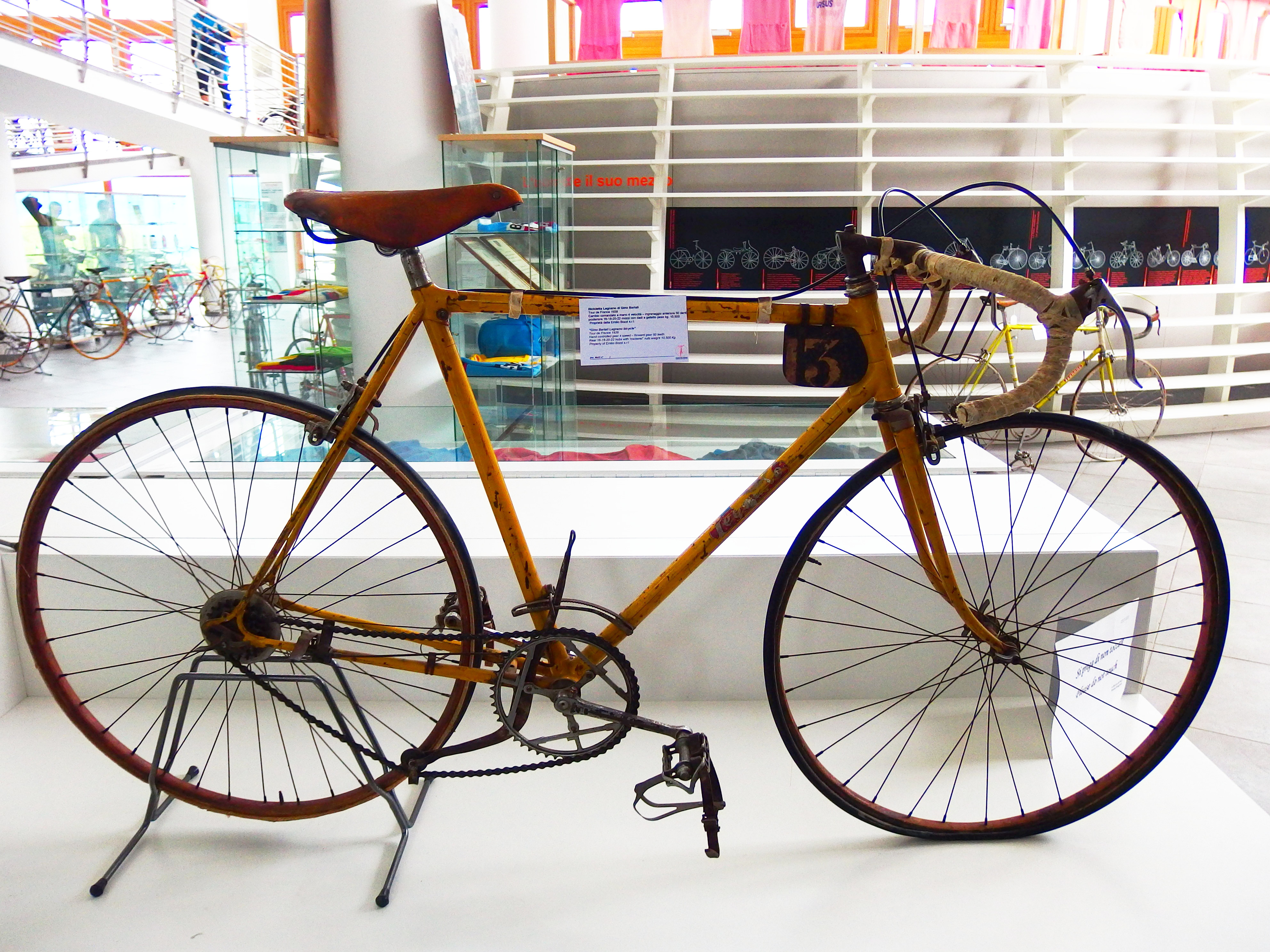
The 4-speed bicycle Bartali rode to victory in the general classification of the 1938 Tour de France

He did return in 1938 and overcame the teamwork of the Belgians, the cold and rain and a puncture on the Col de l'Iseran. He won the hardest stage, from Digne to Briançon, by more than five minutes. The radio commentator Georges Briquet, after he had seen the crowds of Italians greeting Bartali with green-white-red flags, said: "These people had found a superman. Outside Bartali's hotel at Aix-les-Bains, an Italian general was shouting 'Don't touch him – he's a god.'" A public subscription was started in his name in Italy, and Benito Mussolini was among the contributors.

The approaching war led Italy not to send a team in 1939.

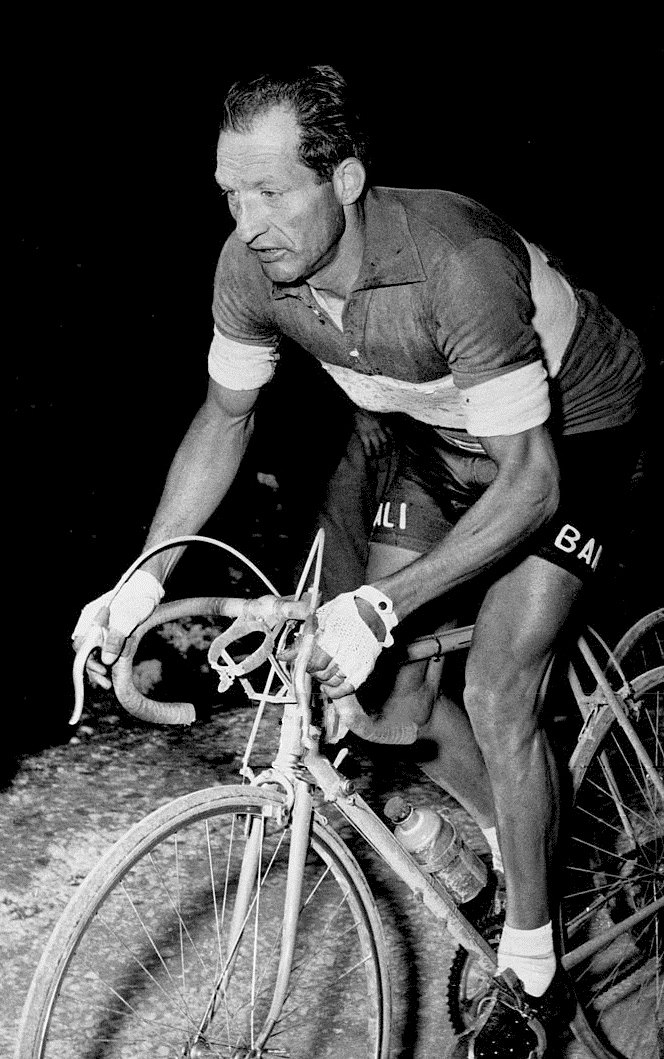
Bartali c. 1945

Bartali won the Giro d'Italia twice before the war – in 1936 and 1937 – and once after it (1946). He won classics such as Milan–San Remo, the Giro di Lombardia and the Züri-Metzgete. His most famous victory was the 1948 Tour de France.

=== 1948: Second Tour ===
Winning [1948] was for him a simple formality. Not only was he the best climber, at the age of 34, but he was the fastest man on the flat. Ten years after his first Parc des Princes lap of honour he rode another with the victor's bouquet. Gino could feel really proud, for he had won seven stages. And he won them in the heroic manner of the legendary giants of yesteryear Tours. He took the opening stage, then two in succession entering the Pyrenees, then a great climax of three successive Alpine stages. Bartali won that 1948 Tour not by a handful of seconds but by over 26 minutes from runner-up Briek Schotte.

— René de Latour,

Bartali returned to the Tour in 1948 to find that many riders he had known had died in the war and that there were as many more who had started racing since he stopped (see below for Bartali's war record). He was so worried that he spent an evening memorising two dozen riders he did not know. The Tour started in a rainstorm, and Bartali found he could identify nobody because the whole field was wearing waterproofs. He took his chance and found he was with Briek Schotte. The two finished together at Trouville, and Bartali took the yellow jersey.

It was during that Tour that the leader of the Italian Communist Party, Palmiro Togliatti, was shot in the neck by a sniper as he was leaving the parliament building. The writer Bernard Chambaz said:

History and myth united, and a miracle if you like because that evening Bartali got a phone call at his hotel. In a bad mood, dubious, he didn't want to answer. But someone whispered that it was Alcide de Gasperi, his old friend from Catholic Action, now parliamentary president, who told him that Palmiro Togliatti, secretary-general of the communist party, had been shot at and had survived by a miracle. The situation in the peninsula was very tense amid the ravages of the Cold War. Italy needed Bartali to do what he best knew how to do, to win stages.

The communists occupied factories and radio and television stations, and angry rows in parliament came close to blows. A revolt was looming. Then Bartali won three stages in a row and led the Tour by 14 minutes. An obituary says:

Just as it seemed the communists would stage a full-scale revolt, a deputy ran into the chamber shouting 'Bartali's won the Tour de France!' All differences were at once forgotten as the feuding politicians applauded and congratulated each other on a cause for such national pride. That day, with immaculate timing, Togliatti awoke from his coma on his hospital bed, inquired how the Tour was going and recommended calm. All over the country political animosities were for the time being swept aside by the celebrations and a looming crisis was averted.

The former prime minister, Giulio Andreotti, said: "To say that civil war was averted by a Tour de France victory is surely excessive. But it is undeniable that on that 14th of July of 1948, day of the attack on Togliatti, Bartali contributed to easing the tensions."

=== 1950: Tour de France ===
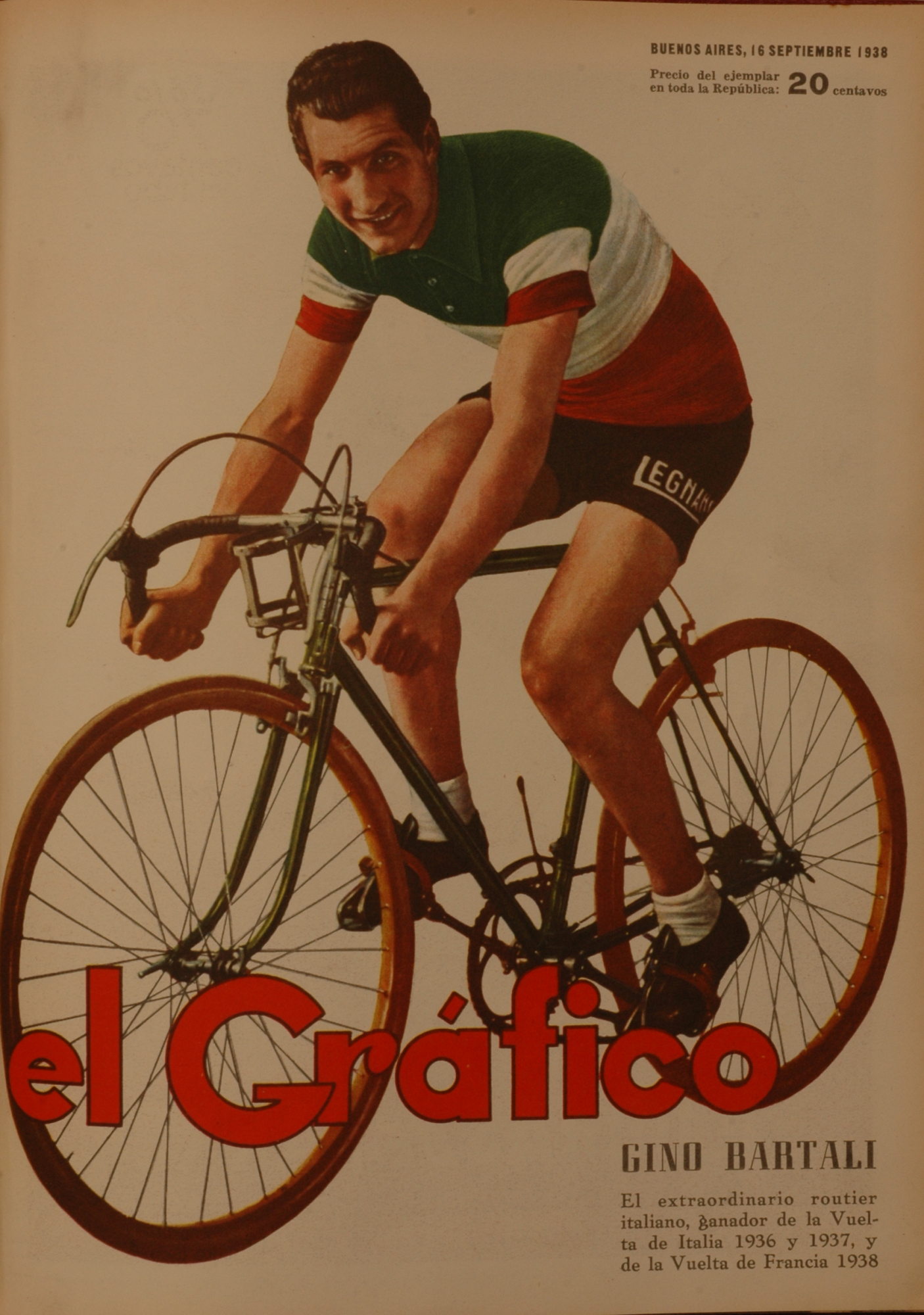
Gino Bartali

Bartali had a row during the 1950 Tour de France with the French rider Jean Robic. Newspapers made much of it, and the atmosphere was tense. Robic got clear of Bartali on the col d'Aubisque in the Pyrenees. Bartali made up ground over the Tourmalet, took the descent to Sainte-Marie-de-Campan and started up the col d'Aspin. There, he caught Robic and the two rode together. The two rubbed shoulders, and they fell.

Bartali said French fans by the road were so angry, accusing him of sabotaging Robic's chances, that they punched him, and one threatened him with a knife. Bartali remounted and won the stage. Fiorenzo Magni, leading the Italian 'B' team, the Cadetti, took the yellow jersey. The pair and their teams had barely returned to their hotel when Bartali said he was going home, and so, he said, were the two Italian teams.

The organisers, Jacques Goddet and Félix Lévitan, went to his hotel, the Hôtel de France, in Lourdes, to dissuade him. Bartali, a cigarette in his mouth, said, "I have no intention of risking my life to a madman." The truth of what happened may never be known: Louison Bobet, who saw the incident on the mountain, said: "I'm pretty sure that in the time it took me to pass him, Bartali wasn't struck, and I think he mistook as blows what was an attempt to get him back in the saddle. A hunt started for the knifeman but all spectators could remember was that a man who had been slicing salami still had his knife in his hand when he went to help."

It then emerged that the Italian teams had been withdrawn by the Italian cycling association. Italian fans grew so angry that a stage due to cross the border to San Remo stopped just short of the Italian border instead, at Menton.

The affair escalated to the national level when the French foreign minister, Robert Schuman, apologised to his Italian counterpart for what seemed to be no more than a man interrupted in the making of a sandwich. René de Latour said:

To say that Magni was sore is putting it very mildly indeed. When he spoke to men he could trust, he would say: 'Gino knows what his little game is. He is too clever to ignore the facts that he will be lucky to win this Tour, and he prefers a foreign team win rather than see one of our team succeed, especially me. It was bad enough for him with Coppi winning last year.

== Rescues and Resistance role during World War II ==
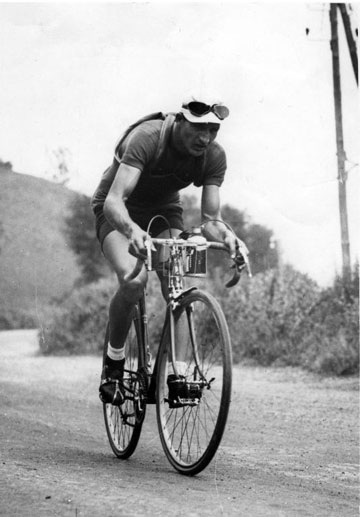
Bartali used bicycle training as a cover for secret efforts to rescue Jews.

Bartali earned respect for his work in helping Jews who were being persecuted by the Nazis during the time of the Italian Social Republic. He appears as a character in the 1978 novel, The Assisi Underground: The Priest who Rescued Jews, and in the 1985 American television film adaptation, both based on the real-life account by Father Rufino Niccacci.

It emerged in December 2010 that Bartali had hidden a Jewish family in his cellar and, according to one of the survivors, saved their lives in doing so.

Bartali used his fame to carry messages and documents to the Italian Resistance, hidden in the frame and handlebars of his bicycle. Bartali cycled from Florence through Tuscany, Umbria, and Marche, many times traveling as far afield as Assisi, all the while wearing the racing jersey emblazoned with his name. Neither the Fascist police nor the German troops risked discontent by arresting him.

Giorgio Nissim, a Jewish accountant from Pisa, was a member of DELASEM, founded by the Union of the Israelitic Communities to help Jewish Italians escape persecution. The network in Tuscany was discovered in autumn 1943, and all Jewish members except Nissim were sent to concentration camps. With the help of the Archbishops of Genoa Pietro Boetto and Florence Elia Dalla Costa, the Franciscan Friars of Assisi and others, Nissim reorganized DELASEM in Tuscany and helped 800 survive.

Nissim died in 2000. His sons found from his diaries that Bartali had used his fame to help. Nissim and the Oblati Friars of Lucca forged documents and needed photographs of those they were helping. Bartali used to leave Florence in the morning, pretending to train, ride to Assisi where many Jews were hiding in the Franciscan convents, collect their photographs and ride back to Nissim. At Assisi Bartali was in direct contact with Rufino Niccacci. Bartali also used his position to learn about raids on safehouses.

Bartali was eventually taken to Villa Triste in Florence. The SD and the Italian RSS official Mario Carità questioned Bartali, threatening his life. In spite of any threats, Bartali did not reveal what he had done. Even after the war, he never boasted his merits; he used to say: "Some medals are made to hang on the soul, not the jacket."

Bartali continued working with the Assisi Network. In 1943, he led Jewish refugees towards the Swiss Alps himself. He cycled, pulling a wagon with a secret compartment, telling patrols it was just part of his training. Bartali told his son Andrea only that "One does these things and then that's that".

In June 2012, a book about Bartali's wartime activities, Road To Valor by Aili and Andres McConnon, was published.

In 2013, Yad Vashem awarded Gino Bartali the honour Righteous Among the Nations. He is a central figure in the 2014 documentary My Italian Secret: The Forgotten Heroes. In 2007, the script for a movie based on Bartali during World War II, called Lion Man of Tuscany was on the Black List, a survey of the "most liked" un-produced scripts in Hollywood.

In 2017, research by Michele Sarfatti questioned Bartali's efforts to save Jewish lives, referring to the very limited sources and contradicting that Bartali would have described this in his diaries. In 2021, Marco and Stefano Pivato corroborated this stance by Sarfatti, calling the whole story 'invented' ('una storia inventata'). In 2021, an interview with Sergio Della Pergola, an Israeli-Italian academic who was involved in Yad Vashem’s investigation of Bartali’s role during the war, was published in the Corriere della Sera. Outlining some of the evidence regarding Bartali's efforts during the war, he disagreed with the argument put forth by Sarfatti and Marco and Stefano Pivato. He was quoted as saying: “To question whether Gino Bartali risked his life to save Jews is like denying that the Earth is round.”

Bartali's wartime rescue efforts were dramatised in the musical Glory Ride, with book, music and lyrics by Victoria Buchholz and Todd Buchholz, which had its world premiere at the Charing Cross Theatre in London's West End in April 2023. In February 2026, the musical had its United States premiere at the Delaware Theatre Company in Wilmington, Delaware.

== Riding style and legacy ==
I have never seen a sports hero so adored. I remember times when Gino could not get out of a hotel even, such was the crush of fans waiting to see him. All the time there would be the roar of shouts which he knew so well, which was really music in his ears: ' Gi-no, Gi-no, Gi-no... ' During the Tour of Italy, Bartali always needed a box of wax balls to stop his ears when he was in bed. Without them there would have been no peace; For right through the night the row kept on, under the window of his room.

— René de Latour

Bartali was a good climber and a pioneer of derailleur gears. His style was unusual: he rarely danced on the pedals and often stayed in the saddle throughout a 15 km climb. When others attacked, he stayed in the saddle but changed up a gear, to a sprocket three teeth smaller.

He rode smoothly on mountains but every now and then freewheeled, always with his right foot lowered, with his weight on it. Then a second or two later, he would start pedalling again.

Bartali's feat of winning three consecutive mountain stages (13, 14 and 15) in the 1948 Tour de France has never been equalled. It is one of the most astonishing accomplishments in the history of road cycling. It would be 50 years before anyone again won three consecutive stages, when Italian cyclist Mario Cipollini did so in the early (flat) stages of the 1999 Tour de France, winning four consecutive sprint finishes in stages 4, 5, 6 and 7.

== Rivalry with Coppi ==
"This mercurial beginner [Fausto Coppi] joined Bartali's team in 1940, and then won the Giro d'ltalia with a massive lead over his team leader. Bartali was astonished and affronted.
Henceforward, the two riders were in personal combat – it often seemed that, as fierce rivals, they cared less about winning a race than beating each other."

— Tim Hilton, The Guardian

Bartali's rivalry with Fausto Coppi divided Italy. Bartali, a conservative, was venerated in the rural, agrarian south, while Coppi, more worldly, secular, innovative in diet and training, was a hero of the industrial north.

The lives of each came together on 7 January 1940 when Eberrardo Pavesi, head of the Legnano team, took on Coppi to ride for Bartali. Bartali thought Coppi was "as thin as a mutton bone", but accepted. Their rivalry started when Coppi, the helper, won the Giro and Bartali, the star, marshalled the two men's team to chase him. By the 1948 world championship at Valkenburg, both climbed off rather than help the other win. The Italian cycling association said: "They have forgotten to honour the Italian prestige they represent. Thinking only of their personal rivalry, they abandoned the race, to the approbation of all sportsmen." They were suspended for two months.

The thaw partly broke when the pair shared a drink bottle during the climb of the Col d'Izoard in the 1952 Tour but the two men fell out over who had offered it. "I did," Bartali insisted. "He never gave me anything." Their rivalry was the subject of intense coverage and resulted in many epic races.

When professional cycle racing resumed in 1946 after World War II, Bartali narrowly beat Coppi in that year's Giro, while Coppi won Milan–San Remo. Bartali won the Tour de Suisse twice, another Milan–San Remo, and the 1948 Tour de France – a full ten years after his last victory. Coppi took victories in the 1947 Giro d'Italia, the Giro di Lombardia and the Grand Prix des Nations.

Despite the rivalry, perhaps heightened by Coppi's victory in the 1949 Giro, Bartali supported Coppi's bid in the 1949 Tour de France. The two Italian teammates destroyed the race as a contest in a mountainous Alpine stage over the Col de Vars and Col d'Izoard. When Coppi had a puncture on the Izoard, Bartali waited for him, then Bartali did the same, and Coppi waited. On the final climb to Briançon, Coppi allowed Bartali to win (on his 35th birthday) and take the yellow jersey. But Coppi assumed the maillot jaune the following day after Bartali had a puncture with 40 km of the stage still to race. Coppi retained the lead to Paris, while Bartali took second place.

The 1950 Tour de France saw him lead the Italian team again, with Coppi electing not to contest the race, but having been threatened by frenzied fans, the entire Italian team resigned from the race.

Bartali always suspected that Coppi took drugs. On the hairpins of the Col di Bracco, during a stage of the 1946 Giro from Genoa to Montecatini Terme, Coppi drank from a glass phial and threw it into the verge. Bartali drove back after the race and found it. He said:

With the meticulous care of a detective collecting evidence for fingerprinting I picked it up, dropped it into a white envelope and put it carefully in my pocket. The next day I rushed round to my personal doctor and asked him to send the phial to a lab for analysis. Disappointment: no drug, no magic potion. It was nothing more than an ordinary tonic, made in France, that I could have bought without a prescription.

I realised that I should have to try to outsmart him and I devised my own investigation system. The first thing was to make sure I always stayed at the same hotel for a race and to have the room next to his so I could mount surveillance. I would watch him leave with his mates, then I would tiptoe into the room which ten seconds earlier had been his headquarters. I would rush to the waste bin and the bedside table, go through the bottles, flasks, phials, tubes, cartons, boxes, suppositories – I swept up everything. I had become so expert in interpreting all these pharmaceuticals that I could predict how Fausto would behave during the course of the stage. I would work out, according to the traces of the product I found, how and when he would attack me.

== Personal life ==
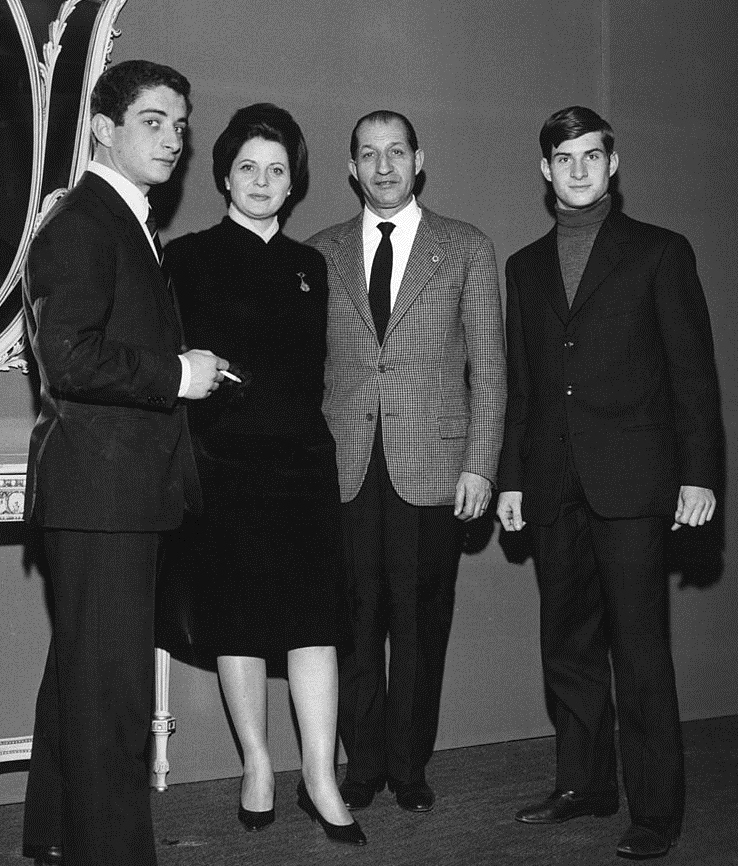
Bartali with wife Adriana Bani and sons Andrea and Luigi Bartali in 1963

Bartali grew up in a religious family in Tuscany, and his belief earned him the nickname "Gino the Pious". He prayed before meals and resented when teammates swore. In contrast, Coppi grew up in Piedmont in the north and was not religious at all. Bartali was proud that Pope John XXIII had asked him to teach him to ride a bicycle. He made no secret that he supported the Catholic-leaning Christian Democratic Party but his personality ensured that he was forgiven by the rival communists. Tim Hilton wrote: "Bartali was a genuinely religious man, making his devotions public and, in return, becoming the Vatican's favourite sportsman – he was personally blessed by three popes. He would set up shrines in his hotel bedrooms when he rode the Giro and the Tour de France, and, on some mountains, children from summer camps sang canticles as he pedalled past, a priest conducting their infant worship."

Bartali was frequently pessimistic. One of his customary phrases was "Everything's wrong; we'll have to start all over again." The best the historian Pierre Chany could say of him was that while he often boasted of what he had done on mountains when nobody was there to see him, he had the grace never to tell the story differently.

Bartali lived at 173 via Chiantigiana, Florence, in a home full of souvenirs. His wife died in 2014, aged 94.

== Later life and death ==
Bartali stopped racing when he was 40, after being injured in a road accident. By then, he had lost much of his money. His wealth was "uncertain", said René de Latour.

Bartali had a heart bypass operation and then died of a heart attack in May 2000, having received the last rites 10 days earlier. He left behind his wife, Adriana, two sons and a daughter. The prime minister, Giuliano Amato, sent condolences. Romano Prodi, president of the European Commission, called him "a symbol of the most noble sportsmanship." The Italian National Olympic Committee (CONI) called for two days of mourning, and silence was observed before sports events.

== Major results ==
1935
1st Road race, National Road Championships
1st Overall Tour of the Basque Country

1st Stages 2, 3 & 5

1st Coppa Bernocchi
2nd Giro della Romagna
3rd Giro di Lombardia
3rd Giro della Provincia di Milano (with Giuseppe Martano)
4th Milan–San Remo
7th Overall Giro d'Italia

1st Mountains classification
1st Stage 6

7th Giro di Campania
8th Grand Prix des Nations
1936
1st Overall Giro d'Italia

1st Mountains classification
1st Stages 9, 17b & 18

1st Giro di Lombardia
1st Giro della Provincia di Milano (with Learco Guerra)
4th Giro di Toscana
7th Road race, UCI Road World Championships
1937
1st Road race, National Road Championships
1st Overall Giro d'Italia

1st Mountains classification
1st Stages 5a (TTT), 8a, 10, 16 & 17

1st Giro del Piemonte
1st Giro del Lazio
Tour de France

1st Stage 7
Held after Stages 7 & 8

2nd Giro di Lombardia
2nd Giro della Provincia di Milano (with Pierino Favalli)
1938
1st Overall Tour de France

1st Mountains classification
1st Stages 11 & 14

1st Tre Valli Varesine
1st Giro della Provincia di Milano (with Pierino Favalli)
2nd Road race, National Road Championships
2nd Giro di Lombardia
6th Giro di Toscana
7th Milan–San Remo
1939
1st Milan–San Remo
1st Giro di Lombardia
1st Giro del Piemonte
1st Giro di Toscana
1st Giro della Provincia di Milano (with Pierino Favalli)
2nd Overall Giro d'Italia

1st Mountains classification
1st Stages 2, 9b, 15 & 17
Held after Stages 2 & 15

2nd Tre Valli Varesine
2nd Giro di Campania
1940
1st Road race, National Road Championships
1st Milan–San Remo
1st Giro di Lombardia
1st Giro di Toscana
1st Giro di Campania
1st Giro della Provincia di Milano (with Pierino Favalli)
9th Overall Giro d'Italia

1st Mountains classification
1st Stages 17 & 19

10th Giro dell'Umbria
1941
2nd Giro di Toscana
2nd Giro del Piemonte
3rd Tre Valli Varesine
3rd Giro dell'Emilia
4th Giro del Lazio
9th Giro di Lombardia
1942
2nd Giro di Lombardia
2nd Giro di Toscana
2nd Giro del Piemonte
3rd Road race, National Road Championships
4th Giro dell'Emilia
4th Giro di Campania
5th Giro del Veneto
8th Giro del Lazio
1943
2nd Giro della Provincia di Milano (with Pierino Favalli)
3rd Giro di Toscana
5th Milan–San Remo
1945
1st Giro di Campania
3rd Giro di Lombardia
3rd Tre Valli Varesine
4th Trofeo Matteotti
7th Road race, National Road Championships
1946
1st Overall Giro d'Italia

1st Mountains classification

1st Overall Tour de Suisse

1st Mountains classification
1st Stages 1, 5, 6 & 8

1st Trofeo Matteotti
1st Züri-Metzgete
4th Milan–San Remo
6th Tour des Quatre-Cantons
1947
1st Overall Tour de Suisse

1st Points classification
1st Mountains classification
1st Stages 1c & 2

1st Milan–San Remo
2nd Overall Giro d'Italia

1st Mountains classification
1st Stages 2 & 15
Held after Stages 4–15

2nd Overall Tour de Romandie

1st Stage 3b

2nd Giro di Lombardia
2nd Giro dell'Emilia
2nd Giro della Romagna
9th Gent–Wevelgem
1948
1st Overall Tour de France

1st Mountains classification
1st Stages 1, 7, 8, 13, 14, 15 & 19

1st Giro di Toscana
1st Züri-Metzgete
2nd Tre Valli Varesine
8th Overall Giro d'Italia
1949
1st Overall Tour de Romandie

1st Stages 1b & 2

2nd Overall Tour de France

1st Stage 16
Held after Stage 16

2nd Overall Giro d'Italia
4th Giro della Romagna
5th Giro del Piemonte
1950
1st Milan–San Remo
1st Giro di Toscana
1st Stage 11 Tour de France
2nd Overall Giro d'Italia

1st Stage 9

2nd Giro della Provincia di Reggio Calabria
1951
1st Giro del Piemonte
2nd Road race, National Road Championships
2nd La Flèche Wallonne
2nd Sassari-Cagliari
2nd Trofeo Baracchi (with Ferdinand Kübler)
4th Overall Tour de France
4th Overall Roma–Napoli–Roma
5th Gran Premio di Lugano
6th Liège–Bastogne–Liège
6th Tre Valli Varesine
9th Road race, UCI Road World Championships
9th Giro della Romagna
10th Overall Giro d'Italia
1952
1st Road race, National Road Championships
1st Giro dell'Emilia
1st Giro della Provincia di Reggio Calabria
2nd Tour du Lac Léman
4th Overall Tour de France
4th Overall Roma–Napoli–Roma

1st Stage 2

5th Overall Giro d'Italia
7th Gran Premio di Lugano
7th Trofeo Baracchi (with Giovanni Corrieri)
1953
1st Giro dell'Emilia
1st Giro di Toscana
4th Overall Giro d'Italia
4th Tre Valli Varesine
7th Giro del Piemonte
8th Overall Tour de Romandie
1954
9th Giro dell'Emilia
10th Giro di Campania

=== Grand Tour general classification results timeline ===
Grand Tour	1935	1936	1937	1938	1939	1940	1941	1942	1943	1944	1945	1946	1947	1948	1949	1950	1951	1952	1953	1954
Vuelta a España	Did not contest during career																			
Giro d'Italia	7	1	1	—	2	9	Not held					1	2	8	2	2	10	5	4	13
Tour de France	—	—	DNF	1	—	Not held							—	1	2	DNF	4	4	11	—

=== Classics results timeline ===
Monuments results timeline
Monument	1935	1936	1937	1938	1939	1940	1941	1942	1943	1944	1945	1946	1947	1948	1949	1950	1951	1952	1953	1954
Milan–San Remo	4	23	—	7	1	1	12	11	5	Not held		4	1	29	15	1	27	37	34	13
Tour of Flanders	Did not contest during career																			
Paris–Roubaix	Did not contest during career																			
Liège–Bastogne–Liège	—	—	—	—	—	Not held			—	NH	—	—	—	—	—	—	6	—	—	—
Giro di Lombardia	3	1	2	2	1	1	9	2	Not held		3	—	2	—	—	31	11	36	—	—

=== Major championship results timeline ===
	1935	1936	1937	1938	1939	1940	1941	1942	1943	1944	1945	1946	1947	1948	1949	1950	1951	1952	1953	1954
World Championships	—	7	—	DNF	Not held							12	—	DNF	—	DNF	9	11	—	—
National Championships	1	—	1	2	—	1	—	3	—	NH	7	2	—	—	—	—	2	1	—	—

Legend
—	Did not compete
DNF	Did not finish
NH	Not Held

== See also ==
- Legends of Italian sport - Walk of Fame
- 69500 Ginobartali, asteroid
- Cycling records
- Yellow jersey statistics
- Pink jersey statistics
- List of Grand Tour general classification winners
- List of Tour de France general classification winners
- List of Tour de France secondary classification winners
- List of Giro d'Italia general classification winners
- Individuals and groups assisting Jews during the Holocaust
- List of Righteous Among the Nations by country
- History of the Jews in Italy
- List of Italians
