= 1947 Milan–San Remo =

Race details
- Dates: 19 March 1947
- Stages: 1
- Distance: 285 km (177 mi)
- Winning time: 8h 33' 00"

Results
	Winner	Gino Bartali (ITA)	(Legnano–Pirelli)
	Second	Ezio Cecchi (ITA)	(Welter)
	Third	Sergio Maggini (ITA)	(Benotto)

The 1947 Milan–San Remo was the 38th edition of the Milan–San Remo cycle race and was held on 19 March 1947. The race started in Milan and finished in San Remo. The race was won by Gino Bartali of the Legnano–Pirelli team.

== General classification ==
Final general classification

Rank	Rider	Team	Time
1	Gino Bartali (ITA)	Legnano–Pirelli	8h 33' 00"
2	Ezio Cecchi (ITA)	Welter	+ 3' 57"
3	Sergio Maggini (ITA)	Benotto	+ 9' 00"
4	Luciano Maggini (ITA)	Benotto	s.t.
5	Osvaldo Bailo (ITA)	Welter	s.t.
6	Olimpio Bizzi (ITA)	Viscontea	s.t.
7	Fiorenzo Magni (ITA)	Viscontea	s.t.
8	Vito Ortelli (ITA)	Benotto	s.t.
9	Albert Sercu (BEL)	Arbos–Talbot	+ 15' 00"
10	Giordano Cottur (ITA)	Wilier Triestina	s.t.
