= 1935 Milan–San Remo =

Race details
- Dates: 17 March 1935
- Stages: 1
- Distance: 281.5 km (174.9 mi)
- Winning time: 7h 48' 39"

Results
	Winner	Giuseppe Olmo (ITA)
	Second	Learco Guerra (ITA)
	Third	Mario Cipriani (ITA)

The 1935 Milan–San Remo was the 28th edition of the Milan–San Remo cycle race and was held on 17 March 1935. The race started in Milan and finished in San Remo. The race was won by Giuseppe Olmo.

== General classification ==
Final general classification

Rank	Rider	Time
1	Giuseppe Olmo (ITA)	7h 48' 39"
2	Learco Guerra (ITA)	+ 0"
3	Mario Cipriani (ITA)	+ 0"
4	Gino Bartali (ITA)	+ 0"
5	Alfredo Bovet (ITA)	+ 1' 54"
6	Aldo Bini (ITA)	+ 1' 54"
7	Antonio Negrini (ITA)	+ 1' 54"
8	Rinaldo Gerini (ITA)	+ 1' 54"
9	Jef Demuysere (BEL)	+ 1' 54"
10	Giuseppe Martano (ITA)	+ 4' 29"
