= 1936 Giro d'Italia =

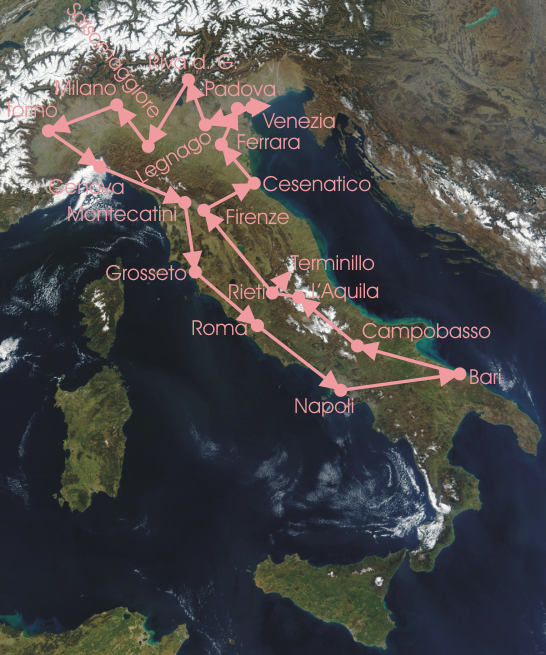
- Race Route

Race details
- Dates: 16 May – 7 June 1936
- Stages: 19, including two split stages
- Distance: 3,766 km (2,340 mi)
- Winning time: 120h 12' 30"

Results
Jersey awarded to the overall winner	Winner	Gino Bartali (ITA)	(Legnano)
	Second	Giuseppe Olmo (ITA)	(Bianchi)
	Third	Severino Canavesi (ITA)	(Ganna)
	Mountains	Gino Bartali (ITA)	(Legnano)
	Team	Legnano	

The 1936 Giro d'Italia was the 24th edition of the Giro d'Italia, organized and sponsored by the newspaper La Gazzetta dello Sport. The race began on 16 May in Milan with a stage that stretched 161 km (100 mi) to Turin, finishing back in Milan on 7 June after a 248 km (154 mi) stage and a total distance covered of 3,766 km (2,340 mi). The race was won by Gino Bartali of the Legnano team, with fellow Italians Giuseppe Olmo and Severino Canavesi coming in second and third respectively.

== Participants ==
Of the 89 riders that began the Giro d'Italia on 16 May, 45 of them made it to the finish in Rome on 7 June. Riders were allowed to ride on their own or as a member of a team; 46 riders competed as part of a team, while the remaining 44 competed independently. The seven teams that partook in the race were: Bianchi, Dei, Fréjus, Ganna, Gloria, Legnano, and Maino.

The peloton was composed of only Italian riders due to the political situation involving Italy at the time. The field featured two former Giro d'Italia winners with Costante Girardengo who won the race in 1919 and 1923 and the returning champion Vasco Bergamaschi. Other notable Italian riders included Gino Bartali, Giovanni Valetti, and Giuseppe Olmo.

== Race summary ==
The first eight stages all ended in sprints. With the absence of time bonuses, this meant that multiple riders were leading the general classification in the same time, with the pink jersey given to the rider with the best positions in these stages. After the sixth stage, not even these position could decide which rider should get the pink jersey, so Olmo and Bini were both given the pink jersey. The eighth stage was won by Olimpio Bizzi, who was nineteen years old at the time. He is the youngest winner of a Giro d'Italia stage as of 2025, and the only teenager.

In the ninth stage, Bartali took the lead with an escape over the Passo Rionero. Bartali won six minutes, and took a firm lead in the general classification.

In the remaining stages, Bartali won almost every major climb. Olmo was able to win back a few minutes, mostly in the two individual time trials, but this was not enough, and Bartali became the winner of the 1936 Giro d'Italia.

== Route and stages ==
Stage results
Stage	Date	Course	Distance	Type (Note: In 1936, there was no distinction in the rules between plain stages and mountain stages; the icons shown here indicate that stages 2, 3, 4, 5, 7, 8, 9, 11, 13, 17a, 17b, 18, and 19 included major mountains. The stage 11 individual time trial also featured a summit finish atop Monte Terminillo.)	Winner
1	16 May	Milan to Turin	161 km (100 mi)	Plain stage	Giuseppe Olmo (ITA)
2	17 May	Turin to Genoa	206 km (128 mi)	Stage with mountain(s)	Aldo Bini (ITA)
3	18 May	Genoa to Montecatini Terme	206 km (128 mi)	Stage with mountain(s)	Raffaele Di Paco (ITA)
	19 May	Rest day			
4	20 May	Montecatini Terme to Grosseto	220 km (137 mi)	Stage with mountain(s)	Fabio Battesini (ITA)
5	21 May	Grosseto to Rome	248 km (154 mi)	Stage with mountain(s)	Giuseppe Olmo (ITA)
	22 May	Rest day			
6	23 May	Rome to Naples	230 km (143 mi)	Plain stage	Giuseppe Olmo (ITA)
7	24 May	Naples to Bari	283 km (176 mi)	Stage with mountain(s)	Raffaele Di Paco (ITA)
	25 May	Rest day			
8	26 May	Bari to Campobasso	243 km (151 mi)	Stage with mountain(s)	Olimpio Bizzi (ITA)
9	27 May	Campobasso to L'Aquila	204 km (127 mi)	Stage with mountain(s)	Gino Bartali (ITA)
10	28 May	L'Aquila to Rieti	117 km (73 mi)	Plain stage	Raffaele Di Paco (ITA)
11	29 May	Rieti to Monte Terminillo	20 km (12 mi)	Individual time trial	Giuseppe Olmo (ITA)
12	30 May	Rieti to Florence	292 km (181 mi)	Plain stage	Giuseppe Olmo (ITA)
13	31 May	Florence to Cesenatico	139 km (86 mi)	Stage with mountain(s)	Giuseppe Olmo (ITA)
14	1 June	Cesenatico to Ferrara	155 km (96 mi)	Plain stage	Raffaele Di Paco (ITA)
15a	2 June	Ferrara to Padua	106 km (66 mi)	Plain stage	Raffaele Di Paco (ITA)
15b	2 June	Padua to Venice	39 km (24 mi)	Individual time trial	Giuseppe Olmo (ITA)
	3 June	Rest day			
16	4 June	Venice to Legnago	183 km (114 mi)	Plain stage	Giuseppe Olmo (ITA)
17a	5 June	Legnago to Riva del Garda	139 km (86 mi)	Stage with mountain(s)	Giuseppe Olmo (ITA)
17b	5 June	Riva del Garda to Gardone Riviera	100 km (62 mi)	Stage with mountain(s)	Gino Bartali (ITA)
18	6 June	Gardone Riviera to Salsomaggiore Terme	206 km (128 mi)	Stage with mountain(s)	Gino Bartali (ITA)
19	7 June	Salsomaggiore Terme to Milan	248 km (154 mi)	Stage with mountain(s)	Giuseppe Olmo (ITA)
	Total		3,766 km (2,340 mi)		

== Classification leadership ==
The leader of the general classification – calculated by adding the stage finish times of each rider – wore a pink jersey. This classification is the most important of the race, and its winner is considered as the winner of the Giro.

The highest ranked isolati cyclist in the general classification were tracked, and the best isolati rider wore the white jersey.

In the mountains classification, the race organizers selected different mountains that the route crossed and awarded points to the riders who crossed them first.

The winner of the team classification was determined by adding the finish times of the best three cyclists per team together and the team with the lowest total time was the winner. If a rider from a team abandoned the race, he could be replaced by a rider who started the 1936 Giro as isolated rider.

The rows in the following table correspond to the jerseys awarded after that stage was run.

Classification leadership
Stage	Winner	General classification	Best isolati rider	Mountains classification	Team classification
1	Giuseppe Olmo	Giuseppe Olmo	Remo Bertoni	not awarded	Maino
2	Aldo Bini	Aldo Bini	Remo Bertoni	not awarded	Maino
3	Raffaele Di Paco	Aldo Bini	Isidoro Piubellini	not awarded	Maino
4	Fabio Battesini	Aldo Bini	Isidoro Piubellini	Gino Bartali	Maino
5	Giuseppe Olmo	Aldo Bini	Isidoro Piubellini	Gino Bartali	Maino
6	Giuseppe Olmo	Aldo Bini & Giuseppe Olmo (Note: Aldo Bini and Giuseppe Olmo had the same amount of time raced and number of points following the stage. The finish of the stage between the two of them was so close, the race organizers let them both wear the pink jersey as leader of the general classification during the seventh stage.)	Isidoro Piubellini	Gino Bartali	Maino
7	Raffaele Di Paco	Giuseppe Olmo	Isidoro Piubellini	Gino Bartali	Legnano
8	Olimpio Bizzi	Giuseppe Olmo	Isidoro Piubellini	Gino Bartali	Legnano
9	Gino Bartali	Gino Bartali	Edoardo Molinar	Gino Bartali	Legnano
10	Raffaele Di Paco	Gino Bartali	Edoardo Molinar	Gino Bartali	Legnano
11	Giuseppe Olmo	Gino Bartali	Edoardo Molinar	Gino Bartali	Legnano
12	Giuseppe Olmo	Gino Bartali	Edoardo Molinar	Gino Bartali	Legnano
13	Giuseppe Olmo	Gino Bartali	Edoardo Molinar	Gino Bartali	Bianchi
14	Raffaele Di Paco	Gino Bartali	Edoardo Molinar	Gino Bartali	Bianchi
15a	Raffaele Di Paco	Gino Bartali	Edoardo Molinar	Gino Bartali	Bianchi
15b	Giuseppe Olmo	Gino Bartali	Edoardo Molinar	Gino Bartali	Bianchi
16	Giuseppe Olmo	Gino Bartali	Edoardo Molinar	Gino Bartali	Bianchi
17a	Giuseppe Olmo	Gino Bartali	Edoardo Molinar	Gino Bartali	Legnano
17b	Gino Bartali	Gino Bartali	Edoardo Molinar	Gino Bartali	Legnano
18	Gino Bartali	Gino Bartali	Edoardo Molinar	Gino Bartali	Legnano
19	Giuseppe Olmo	Gino Bartali	Edoardo Molinar	Gino Bartali	Legnano
Final		Gino Bartali!	Edoardo Molinar	Gino Bartali	Legnano

== Final standings ==
Legend
A pink jersey	Denotes the winner of the General classification
A white jersey	Denotes the winner of the isolated rider classification

=== General classification ===
Final general classification (1–10)
Rank	Name	Team	Time
1	Gino Bartali (ITA)	Legnano	120h 12' 30"
2	Giuseppe Olmo (ITA)	Bianchi	+ 2' 36"
3	Severino Canavesi (ITA)	Ganna	+ 7' 49"
4	Adalino Mealli (ITA)	Legnano	+ 14' 04"
5	Giovanni Valetti (ITA)	Fréjus	+ 14' 15"
6	Domenico Piemontesi (ITA)	Bianchi	+ 16' 31"
7	Ambrogio Morelli (ITA)	Ganna	+ 17' 44"
8	Vasco Bergamaschi (ITA)	Maino	+ 18' 35"
9	Enrico Mollo (ITA)	Gloria	+ 19' 27"
10	Edoardo Molinar (ITA)	—	+ 20' 48"

=== Isolati classification ===
Final isolati rider classification (1–10)
Rank	Name	Time
1	Edoardo Molinar (ITA)	120h 33' 18"
2	Mario Vicini (ITA)	+ 17' 13"
3	Luigi Macchi (ITA)	+ 24' 25"
4	Fausto Montesi (ITA)	+ 26' 16"
5	Aurelio Scazzola (ITA)	+ 41' 18"
6	Augusto Como (ITA)	+ 50' 48"
7	Umberto Guarducci (ITA)	+ 56' 56"
8	Carlo Moretti (ITA)	+ 1h 01' 31"
9	Pietro Rimoldi (ITA)	+ 1h 21' 18"
10	Ambrogio Perego (ITA)	+ 2h 35' 12"

=== Mountains classification ===
Final mountains classification (1–10)
	Name	Team	Points
1	Gino Bartali (ITA)	Legnano	38.5
2	Severino Canavesi (ITA)	Ganna	25
3	Edoardo Molinar (ITA)	—	11
4	Enrico Mollo (ITA)	Gloria	10
5	Adalino Mealli (ITA)	Legnano	6
6	Giuseppe Olmo (ITA)	Bianchi	5
7	Romeo Rossi (ITA)	—	4
7	Mario Vicini (ITA)	—	4
9	Giovanni Valetti (ITA)	Fréjus	2.5
10	Pietro Rimoldi (ITA)	—	2
10	Luigi Macchi (ITA)	Gloria	2
10	Walter Generati (ITA)	—	2
10	Alfredo Mamesi (ITA)	Gloria	2
10	Luigi Giacobbe (ITA)	—	2
10	Cesare Del Cancia (ITA)	Ganna	2

=== Team classification ===
Final team classification (1–7)
	Team	Time
1	Legnano	361h 29' 35"
2	Ganna	+ 4' 59"
3	Bianchi	+ 6' 59"
4	Frèjus	+ 22' 02"
5	Gloria	+ 29' 39"
6	Maino	+ 1h 01' 07"
7	Dei	+ 3h 15' 09"
