= Osvaldo Bailo =

Italian cyclist

Personal information
- Born: 12 September 1912 Serravalle Scrivia, Italy
- Died: 28 February 1997 (aged 84) Serravalle Scrivia, Italy

Cycling career
- Sport: Cycling
- Discipline: Road
- Role: Rider

Osvaldo Bailo (12 September 1912 – 28 February 1997) was an Italian professional road cyclist.

Professional from 1934 to 1947, Bailo won several Italian semi-classics and wore the Maglia Rosa for two days during the 1940 Giro d'Italia.

== Major results ==
1935
2nd Genoa–Nice
1936
8th Giro di Lombardia
1937
1st Giro di Romagna
2nd Genoa–Nice
6th Milan–San Remo
1938
2nd Giro del Veneto
2nd Milano–Mantova
3rd Giro di Lombardia
8th Milan–San Remo
1939
3rd Milan–San Remo
3rd Milano–Mantova
4th Giro di Lombardia
7th Tre Valli Varesine
1940
1st Giro dell'Emilia
2nd Giro di Lombardia
3rd Road race, National Road Championships
3rd Gran Piemonte
3rd Giro di Campania
3rd Giro della Provincia Milano
3rd Overall GP Leptis-Magna
10th Milan–San Remo
1941
3rd Gran Piemonte
3rd Milano–Modena
3rd Giro di Campania
8th Giro dell'Emilia
1942
1st Giro del Lazio
2nd Milano–Torino
3rd Giro del Veneto
7th Giro di Lombardia
10th Milan–San Remo
1943
9th Giro di Toscana
9th Milan–San Remo
1946
1st Coppa Bernocchi
1st Tour du Nord-Ouest
6th Giro di Lombardia
6th Zürich–Lausanne
8th Milan–San Remo
1947
5th Milan–San Remo
