= 1937 Milan–San Remo =

Race details
- Dates: 19 March 1937
- Stages: 1
- Distance: 281.5 km (174.9 mi)
- Winning time: 7h 31' 30"

Results
	Winner	Cesare Del Cancia (ITA)	(Ganna)
	Second	Pierino Favalli (ITA)	(Legnano)
	Third	Marco Cimatti (ITA)	(Mercier–Hutchinson)

The 1937 Milan–San Remo was the 30th edition of the Milan–San Remo cycle race and was held on 19 March 1937. The race started in Milan and finished in San Remo. The race was won by Cesare Del Cancia of the Ganna team.

== General classification ==
Final general classification

Rank	Rider	Team	Time
1	Cesare Del Cancia (ITA)	Ganna	7h 31' 30"
2	Pierino Favalli (ITA)	Legnano	+ 2' 20"
3	Marco Cimatti (ITA)	Mercier–Hutchinson	+ 2' 50"
4	Attilio Masarati (ITA)	Il Bertoldo	s.t.
5	Olimpio Bizzi (ITA)	Fréjus	s.t.
6=	Osvaldo Bailo (ITA)	Legnano	s.t.
6=	Giovanni Cazzulani (ITA)	Legnano	s.t.
6=	Luigi Macchi (ITA)	Il Littoriale	s.t.
9=	Elio Bavutti (ITA)	Fréjus	s.t.
9=	Giotto Cinelli (ITA)	Bianchi	s.t.
