= Settimio Simonini =

Italian cyclist

Personal information
- Born: 8 July 1913 Mulazzo, Italy
- Died: 14 June 1986 (aged 72) Angera, Italy

Cycling career
- Sport: Cycling
- Discipline: Road
- Role: Rider

Settimio Simonini (8 July 1913 – 14 June 1986) was an Italian racing cyclist. He rode in the 1937 Tour de France. He also won the Giro dell'Appennino in 1936 and 1948, and finished in the top 10 overall in the Giro d'Italia three times. Simonini won the white jersey for best grouped rider in the 1938 and 1939 Giro d'Italia.

In the third stage of the 1988 Giro d'Italia, he was honored with a sprint in Villafranca di Verona.

== Major results ==
1936
1st Giro dell'Appennino
3rd Piccolo Giro di Lombardia
7th Giro di Lombardia
1938
4th Overall Giro d'Italia
1939
5th Overall Giro d'Italia
8th Overall Tour de Suisse
1940
10th Overall Giro d'Italia
1947
4th Giro dell'Appennino
1948
1st Giro dell'Appennino
3rd Giro dell'Emilia
10th Giro di Lombardia
1949
3rd Overall Tour de Romandie
6th Overall Volta a Catalunya
1950
9th Milan–San Remo
