= 1929 Giro di Lombardia =

Race details
- Dates: 26 October 1929
- Stages: 1
- Distance: 238 km (147.9 mi)
- Winning time: 8h 13' 10"

Results
	Winner	Pietro Fossati (ITA)
	Second	Adriano Zanaga (ITA)
	Third	Raffaele Di Paco (ITA)

The 1929 Giro di Lombardia was the 25th edition of the Giro di Lombardia cycle race and was held on 26 October 1929. The race started and finished in Milan. The race was won by Pietro Fossati.

== General classification ==
Final general classification

Rank	Rider	Team	Time
1	Pietro Fossati (ITA)	Maino-Clement	8h 13' 10"
2	Adriano Zanaga (ITA)	Touring	+ 0"
3	Raffaele Di Paco (ITA)		+ 0"
4	Felice Gremo (ITA)	Ideor	+ 0"
5	Learco Guerra (ITA)	Maino-Clement	+ 0"
6	Luigi Barral (ITA)		+ 0"
7	Mario Bianchi (ITA)	Gloria-Hutchinson	+ 0"
8	Pietro Bestetti (ITA)	Bianchi-Pirelli	+ 3' 40"
9	Adolfo Martinelli (ITA)		+ 3' 40"
10	Ambrogio Morelli (ITA)	Gloria-Hutchinson	+ 3' 40"
