= 1949 Tour de Romandie =

Race details
- Dates: 12–15 May 1949
- Stages: 4
- Distance: 858 km (533 mi)
- Winning time: 25h 00' 41"

Results
	Winner	Gino Bartali (ITA)
	Second	Ferdinand Kübler (SUI)
	Third	Settimio Simonini (ITA)

The 1949 Tour de Romandie was the third edition of the Tour de Romandie cycle race and was held from 12 to 15 May 1949. The race started and finished in Geneva. The race was won by Gino Bartali.

== General classification ==
Final general classification
Rank	Rider	Time
1	Gino Bartali (ITA)	25h 00' 41"
2	Ferdinand Kübler (SUI)	+ 1' 24"
3	Settimio Simonini (ITA)	+ 4' 55"
4	Fritz Schär (SUI)	+ 5' 39"
5	Jean Brun (SUI)	+ 9' 06"
6	Charles Guyot (SUI)	+ 11' 14"
7	Jean Goldschmit (LUX)	+ 11' 57"
8	Bim Diederich (LUX)	+ 13' 39"
9	Léon Jomaux (BEL)	+ 13' 46"
10	Édouard Fachleitner (FRA)	+ 14' 14"
