= Carmine Saponetti =

Italian cyclist

Personal information
- Born: 12 June 1913
- Died: 31 October 1990 (aged 77)

Cycling career
- Sport: Cycling
- Role: Rider

Carmine Saponetti (12 June 1913 – 31 October 1990) was an Italian racing cyclist. He won stages 4 and 6a of the 1939 Giro d'Italia.
