= 1940 Milan–San Remo =

Race details
- Dates: 19 March 1940
- Stages: 1
- Distance: 281.5 km (174.9 mi)
- Winning time: 7h 44' 00"

Results
	Winner	Gino Bartali (ITA)	(Legnano)
	Second	Pietro Rimoldi (ITA)	(Olympia)
	Third	Aldo Bini (ITA)	(Bianchi)

The 1940 Milan–San Remo was the 33rd edition of the Milan–San Remo cycle race and was held on 19 March 1940. The race started in Milan and finished in San Remo. The race was won by Gino Bartali of the Legnano team.

== General classification ==
Final general classification

Rank	Rider	Team	Time
1	Gino Bartali (ITA)	Legnano	7h 44' 00
2	Pietro Rimoldi (ITA)	Olympia	s.t.
3	Aldo Bini (ITA)	Bianchi	s.t.
4	Ruggero Moro (ITA)	Binda SC	s.t.
5	Oreste Sartori (ITA)	Binda SC	s.t.
6	Salvatore Crippa (ITA)		s.t.
7	Enrico Bolis (ITA)		s.t.
8	Attilio Masarati (ITA)	Battisti-Aquilano	s.t.
=8	Renzo Silvestri (ITA)	Parioli SS	s.t.
10	Guerrino Amadori (ITA)	Battisti-Aquilano	s.t.
