= Luciano Maggini =

Italian cyclist

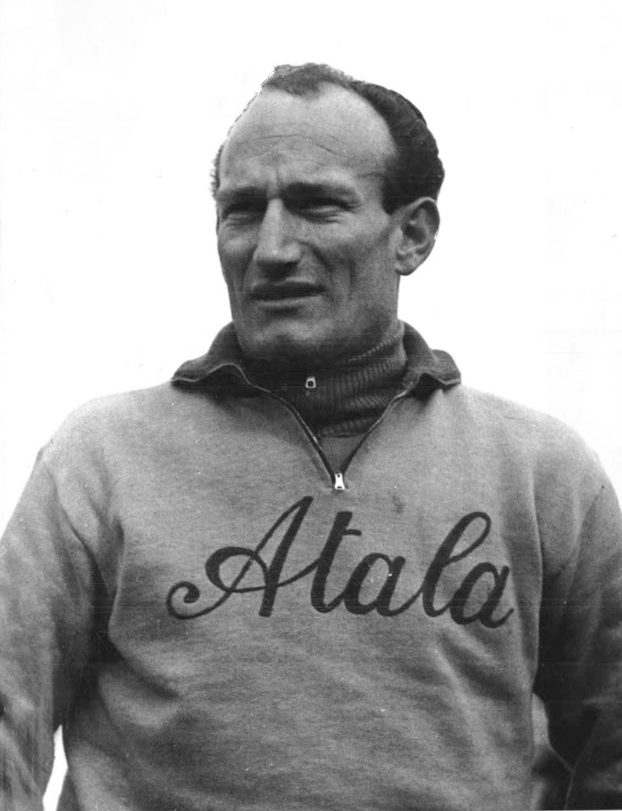

Personal information
- Born: 16 May 1925 Seano, Italy
- Died: 24 January 2012 (aged 86) Seano, Italy

Cycling career
- Sport: Cycling
- Current team: Retired
- Discipline: Road
- Role: Rider

Professional teams
- 1946–1947: Benotto
- 1948–1949: Wilier – Triestina
- 1950: Taurea
- 1951–1955: Atala

Luciano Maggini (16 May 1925 – 24 January 2012) was an Italian road bicycle racer who competed professionally between 1946 and 1957. He rode the Giro d'Italia in 1947–53, with a top result of fifth place overall in 1950; he won individual stages in 1947–49 and 1951. His elder brother Sergio was also a professional road racer.

== Major victories ==
1945
3rd Giro del Lazio
1947
Giro d'Italia

1st Stages 3 & 5

4th Milan–San Remo
7th Giro di Romagna
1948
1st Giro del Veneto
1st Giro di Campania
1st Stage 3 Giro d'Italia
2nd Giro di Toscana
2nd GP Alghero
3rd Road race, National Road Championships
4th Road race, UCI Road World Championships
6th Zürich–Lausanne
9th Giro dell'Emilia
1949
1st Gran Premio Industria e Commercio di Prato
2nd Road race, National Road Championships
2nd Giro del Lazio
3rd Milan–Modena
5th Giro di Romagna
1950
1st Giro dell'Emilia
2nd Milan–Modena
4th Giro di Toscana
5th Overall Giro d'Italia

1st Stages 7 & 13

7th Tre Valli Varesine
1951
1st Giro dell'Emilia
1st Giro della Provincia di Reggio Calabria
1st Stage 13 Giro d'Italia
2nd Giro del Veneto
4th Giro di Toscana
5th Giro del Lazio
7th Overall Roma–Napoli–Roma
1952
1st Gran Premio Industria e Commercio di Prato
1st Giro di Romagna
1st Stage 1a Roma–Napoli–Roma
2nd Gran Piemonte
9th Giro dell'Emilia
1953
1st Milano–Torino
1st Coppa Placci
1st Giro della Provincia di Reggio Calabria
2nd Gran Premio Industria e Commercio di Prato
2nd Giro del Veneto
7th Giro di Romagna
8th Giro del Lazio
1954
1st Giro del Veneto
3rd Milano–Torino
8th Tre Valli Varesine
1955
2nd Giro del Lazio
3rd Coppa Bernocchi
5th Milano–Torino
7th Giro di Romagna
10th Giro di Toscana
1956
7th Giro del Lazio
