= 1947 Tour de Suisse =

Race details
- Dates: 16–23 August 1947
- Stages: 7
- Distance: 1,612 km (1,002 mi)
- Winning time: 47h 35' 55"

Results
	Winner	Gino Bartali (ITA)
	Second	Giulio Bresci (ITA)
	Third	Stan Ockers (BEL)

The 1947 Tour de Suisse was the 11th edition of the Tour de Suisse cycle race and was held from 16 August to 23 August 1947. The race started and finished in Zürich. The race was won by Gino Bartali.

== General classification ==
Final general classification

Rank	Rider	Time
1	Gino Bartali (ITA)	47h 35' 55"
2	Giulio Bresci (ITA)	+ 21' 16"
3	Stan Ockers (BEL)	+ 24' 33"
4	Ferdinand Kübler (SUI)	+ 25' 56"
5	Fausto Coppi (ITA)	+ 40' 06"
6	Bruno Pasquini (ITA)	+ 45' 38"
7	Prosper Depredomme (BEL)	+ 45' 48"
8	Jacques Geus (BEL)	+ 47' 16"
9	Ernst Stettler (SUI)	+ 48' 02"
10	Marcel Dupont (BEL)	+ 51' 58"
