= 1935 Tour of the Basque Country =

Race details
- Dates: 7–11 August 1935
- Stages: 5
- Distance: 873 km (542 mi)
- Winning time: 30h 09' 28"

Results
	Winner	Gino Bartali (ITA)
	Second	Dante Gianello (FRA)
	Third	Julián Berrendero (ESP)

The 1935 Tour of the Basque Country was the eighth edition of the Tour of the Basque Country cycle race and was held from 7 August to 11 August 1935. The race started and finished in Bilbao. The race was won by Gino Bartali.

== General classification ==
Final general classification

Rank	Rider	Time
1	Gino Bartali (ITA)	30h 09' 28"
2	Dante Gianello (FRA)	+ 47"
3	Julián Berrendero (ESP)	+ 3' 31"
4	Fédérico Ezquerra (ESP)	+ 5' 34"
5	Emiliano Álvarez (ESP)	+ 6' 30"
6	Joseph Neri (FRA)	+ 7' 23"
7	Fermín Trueba (ESP)	+ 7' 35"
8	Antonio Negrini (ITA)	+ 10' 13"
9	Cipriano Elys (ESP)	+ 15' 19"
10	Alfredo Bovet (ITA)	+ 16' 39"
