= Giovanni De Stefanis =

Italian cyclist

Personal information
- Born: 9 July 1915 Castellinaldo, Italy
- Died: 23 October 2006 (aged 91) Agliano Terme, Italy

Cycling career
- Sport: Cycling
- Discipline: Road
- Role: Rider

Giovanni De Stefanis (9 July 1915 – 23 October 2006) was an Italian racing cyclist from 1938 until 1948. In the 1940 Giro d'Italia, he won the white jersey for the best grouped rider, while finishing eighth in the general classification.

== Results ==
=== General classification results timeline ===
Grand Tour general classification results
Race	1940	1941	1942	1943	1944	1945	1946	1947
Giro d'Italia	8	Not held					21	13
