= Gerbi =

Gerbi is an Italian surname. Notable people with the surname include:

- Erik Gerbi (born 2000), Italian football forward
- Giovanni Gerbi (1885–1955), Italian cyclist
- Julien Gerbi (born 1985), French-Algerian racing driver
- Sandro Gerbi(born 1943), Italian journalist
- Susan Gerbi (born 1944), American biochemist
- Veronica Gerbi, Italian curler
- Yarden Gerbi (born 1989), Israeli judoka

== See also ==
- Estiva Gerbi, town in Brazil
