= Pietro Rimoldi =

Italian cyclist

Personal information
- Full name: Pietro Rimoldi
- Born: 5 November 1911 Busto Arsizio, Italy
- Died: 14 November 2000 (aged 89) Busto Arsizio, Italy

Cycling career
- Sport: Cycling
- Discipline: Road
- Role: Rider

Major wins
- Coppa Bernocchi (1934); Genova - Nizza (1936); Giro del Piemonte (1938)

Pietro Rimoldi (Sacconago, Busto Arsizio, Lombardy, Italy, 5 November 1911 – Busto Arsizio, 14 November 2000) was an Italian cyclist who competed as a professional from 1932 to 1942.

His best results are victories in the Coppa Bernocchi in 1934 and the Giro del Piemonte in 1938. He also achieved podium finishes in the Italian Classics Milan - San Remo in 1933 and 1940 and the Giro di Lombardia in 1933.

== Palmares ==
DNF - Did not finish

- 1933
  - 3rd Milan - San Remo
  - 3rd Giro di Lombardia
- 1934
  - 1st Coppa Bernocchi
  - 1st Circuito Emiliano, Bologna
- 1935
  - 1st Coppa Collecchio
- 1936
  - 1st Genoa–Nice
  - 1st Coppa Città Busto Arsizio
- 1937
  - 1st Coppa Città Busto Arsizio
- 1938
  - 1st Giro del Piemonte
- 1940
  - 2nd Milano - Sanremo

=== Results for the Giro de Italia ===
- 1933: 35th
- 1934: DNF
- 1936: 38th
- 1937: 30th
- 1938: 34th
- 1939: 47th
- 1940: 43rd

=== Result for the Tour de France ===
- 1935: DNF (stage 15)
