= 1950 Milan–San Remo =

Race details
- Dates: 18 March 1950
- Stages: 1
- Distance: 282 km (175 mi)
- Winning time: 7h 18' 52"

Results
	Winner	Gino Bartali (ITA)	(Bartali–Gardiol)
	Second	Nedo Logli (ITA)	(Ganna–Superga)
	Third	Oreste Conte (ITA)	(Bianchi–Ursus)

The 1950 Milan–San Remo was the 41st edition of the Milan–San Remo cycle race and was held on 18 March 1950. The race started in Milan and finished in San Remo. The race was won by Gino Bartali of the Bartali–Gardiol team.

== General classification ==
Final general classification

Rank	Rider	Team	Time
1	Gino Bartali (ITA)	Bartali–Gardiol	7h 18' 52"
2	Nedo Logli (ITA)	Ganna–Superga	+ 0"
3	Oreste Conte (ITA)	Bianchi–Ursus	+ 0"
4	Fiorenzo Magni (ITA)	Wilier Triestina	+ 0"
5	Louis Caput (FRA)	Olympia–Dunlop	+ 0"
6	Alfredo Pasotti (ITA)	Stucchi–Ursus	+ 0"
7	Rik Van Steenbergen (BEL)	Mercier–Hutchinson	+ 0"
8	Aldo Tosi (ITA)	Benotto–Superga	+ 0"
=9	Giorgio Albani (ITA)	Legnano–Pirelli	+ 0"
=9	Giancarlo Astrua (ITA)	Taurea–Pirelli	+ 0"
