= Secondo Magni =

Italian cyclist

Personal information
- Born: 24 March 1912 Fucecchio, Italy
- Died: 17 August 1997 (aged 85)

Cycling career
- Sport: Cycling
- Role: Rider

Secondo Magni (24 March 1912 – 17 August 1997) was an Italian racing cyclist. He won stage 14 of the 1939 Giro d'Italia.
