= Giuseppe Olmo =

Italian cyclist (1911–1992)

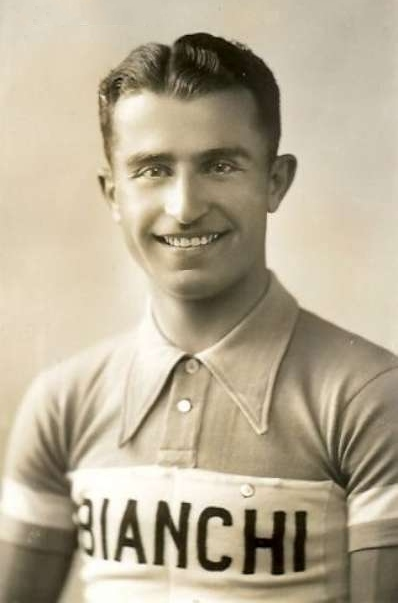

Personal information
- Full name: Giuseppe Olmo
- Born: 22 November 1911 Celle Ligure, Kingdom of Italy
- Died: 5 March 1992 (aged 80) Milan, Italy
- Height: 167 cm (5 ft 6 in)

Cycling career
- Sport: Cycling
- Discipline: Road
- Role: Rider

Professional teams
- 1933–1940: Bianchi
- 1940–1942: Dei

Major wins
- Olympic Team road race (1932); Milan-Sanremo (1935, 1938); Giro d'Italia, 20 stages National Road Race Championship (1936)
Medal record
Representing Italy
Men's road bicycle racing
Olympic Games
Gold medal – first place	1932 Los Angeles	Team road race
World Championships
Silver medal – second place	1931 Copenhagen	Amateur's road race

Giuseppe Olmo (22 November 1911 – 5 March 1992) was an Italian road bicycle racer. He competed at the 1932 Olympics and won a gold medal in the team road race, placing fourth individually. In October 1935 he set a new hour record at 45.090 km.

As with many Italian bicycle racers, after his retirement in the late 1930s he began building bicycles, and founded Olmo (also known as Olmo Biciclette). The Olmo Biciclette manufacturing center was set up in his home town of Celle Ligure Italy in 1938, where the company continues to manufacture their bicycles today.

Later in his life, Giuseppe (Often called "Gepin" for short) came to be known as a successful entrepreneur and between the 1940s and 1970s he expanded his company into several manufacturing industries. These individual businesses are all managed under the Olmo Group today. Olmo la Biciclissima or Giuseppe Olmo spa, as the bicycle manufacture goes by today. They produced some very high quality bicycles often comparative quality to the great Colnago. Today they produce many high quality race bicycles, as well as mountain and city bicycles of ranging quality.

== Major results ==
1932
(gold) , Olympic Team road race (with Attilio Pavesi and Guglielmo Segato)
1st, Milano–Torino
1933
1st, Stages 4 and 12, Giro d'Italia
1934
4th, Giro d'Italia

1st, Stages 13, 16 and 17

1935
1st, Milan–San Remo
3rd, Giro d'Italia

1st, Stages 5, 13, 17 and 18

1936
Italy National Road Race Championship
1st, Giro dell'Emilia
2nd, Giro d'Italia

1st, Stages 1, 5, 6, 11, 12, 13, 15b, 16, 17a and 19

1937
1st, Stage 6, Giro d'Italia
1938
1st, Milan–San Remo

Records
Preceded by Maurice Richard	UCI hour record (45.090 km); 31 October 1935 – 14 October 1936	Succeeded by Maurice Richard
