= Pietro Chiappini =

Italian cyclist

Personal information
- Born: 27 June 1915 Spianate, Italy
- Died: 14 January 1988 (aged 72)

Cycling career
- Sport: Cycling
- Role: Rider

Pietro Chiappini (27 June 1915 – 14 January 1988) was an Italian racing cyclist. He won stage 11 of the 1939 Giro d'Italia.
