= Enrico Mollo =

Italian cyclist

Personal information
- Born: 24 July 1913 Turin, Italy
- Died: 10 March 1992 (aged 78) Turin, Italy

Cycling career
- Sport: Cycling
- Discipline: Road
- Role: Rider

Enrico Mollo (24 July 1913 – 10 March 1992) was an Italian racing cyclist. He won the 1935 edition of the Giro di Lombardia.

== Major results ==
1935
1st Giro di Lombardia
1936
1st Coppa Bernocchi
2nd Giro del Lazio
3rd Tre Valli Varesine
9th Overall Giro d'Italia
1937
3rd Overall Giro d'Italia
1938
2nd Giro della Romagna
3rd Giro dell'Umbria
1940
2nd Overall Giro d'Italia
1941
2nd Giro dell'Umbria
1946
1st Giro dell'Apennino
1st Tre Valli Varesine
1st Coppa Città di Asti

=== General classification results timeline ===
Grand Tour general classification results
Race	1936	1937	1938	1939	1940
Giro d'Italia	9	3	—	—	2
Tour de France	—	—	38	—	—
Vuelta a España	—	—	—	—	—

Legend
—	Did not compete
DNF	Did not finish
