= Lygie (cycling team) =

Italian professional cycling team

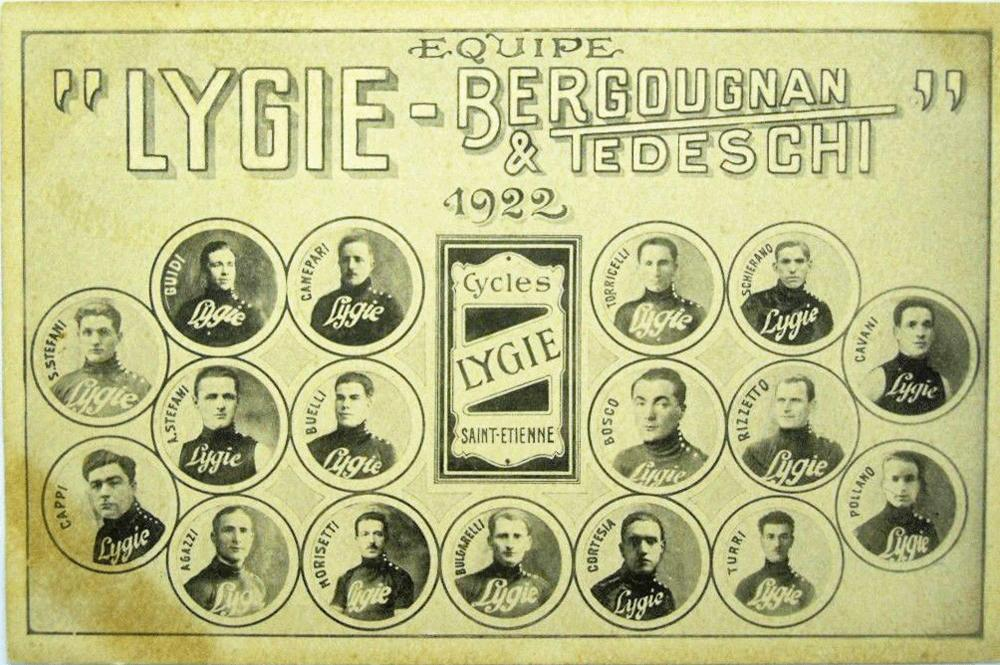
- The Lygie team of 1922

Team information
- Registered: Italy
- Founded: 1922
- Disbanded: 1964
- Discipline: Road

Key personnel
- Team manager: Alfredo Sivocci

Team name history
- 1922–1923 1938 1939–1940 1946 1947 1948–1949 1950–1951 1952–1953 1954 1955–1958 1959 1960 1963–1964: Lygie; Lygie–Settebello; Lygie; Lygie; Lygie–Pirelli; Lygie; Lygie–Pirelli; Lygie; Lygie–Torpado; Lygie; Lygie–Pirelli; Lygie; Lygie

Lygie was an Italian professional cycling team that existed for several periods between 1922 and 1964.

The team was sponsored by Lygie, an Italian bicycle manufacturer.

They participated in 8 editions of the Giro d'Italia, earning 11 stage wins as well as the mountains classification by Vito Taccone in 1963

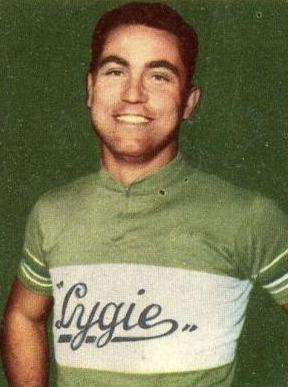
Mario Ghella wearing the team's jersey
