= Ezio Cecchi =

Italian cyclist

Personal information
- Full name: Ezio Cecchi
- Born: 11 May 1913 Lanciano, Italy
- Died: 19 August 1984 (aged 71) Monsummano Terme, Italy

Cycling career
- Sport: Cycling
- Discipline: Road

Professional teams
- 1934: Individual
- 1935–1941: Gloria
- 1946: Ricci/Centro Sportivo Italiano
- 1947: Welter
- 1948–1950: Cimatti
- 1951: Individual

Ezio Cecchi (11 May 1913 – 19 August 1984) was an Italian professional cyclist. Cecchi twice finished second overall in the Giro d'Italia. He finished second in 1938 to Giovanni Valetti. In 1948 Cecchi finished eleven seconds behind the winner Fiorenzo Magni; this margin of victory is still the slimmest margin of victory in the history of the Giro d'Italia.
