= Diego Marabelli =

Italian cyclist

Personal information
- Born: 23 February 1914 Zerbo, Italy
- Died: 12 July 2006 (aged 92)

Cycling career
- Sport: Cycling
- Role: Rider

Diego Marabelli (23 February 1914 – 12 July 2006) was an Italian racing cyclist. He won stage 16 of the 1938 Giro d'Italia.
