= Salvatore Crippa =

Italian cyclist

Salvatore Crippa (1914–1971) was an Italian road cyclist.

== Giro d'Italia ==
He finished 4th overall at the 1946 Giro d'Italia. This was his best of five finishes (and one withdrawal), with two other top ten finishes - 6th at the 1939 Giro d'Italia and 8th at the 1947 Giro d'Italia. He also won the 5th stage at the 1938 Giro d'Italia.

== Monuments ==
His best finish among the cycling classics was a third place at the 1939 Giro di Lombardia, considered a monument.

== Other events ==
In 1936 he won the Piccolo Giro di Lombardia. He was also three-time winner of the Medaglia d'Oro Città di Monza and three-time winner of the Coppa d'Inverno - Biassono. He also finished 9th at the 1946 La Course du Tour de France.
