= Mario Cipriani =

Italian cyclist

Personal information
- Born: 29 May 1909
- Died: 10 June 1944 (aged 35)

Cycling career
- Sport: Cycling
- Role: Rider

Mario Cipriani (29 May 1909 – 10 June 1944) was an Italian racing cyclist. He won stage 6 of the 1933 Giro d'Italia. He was killed in a bombing raid during World War II.
