= Pierino Favalli =

Italian cyclist

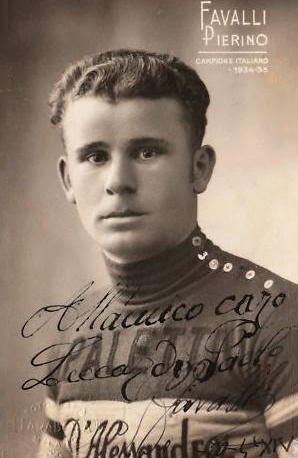

Personal information
- Born: 1 May 1914 Zanengo di Grumello, Cremona, Italy
- Died: 14 May 1986 (aged 72) Cremona, Italy

Cycling career
- Sport: Cycling

Amateur team

Professional team
- 1936–43: Legnano
Medal record
Representing Italy
Men's road bicycle racing
World Championships
Bronze medal – third place	1936 Bern	Amateur's road race

Pierino Favalli (1 May 1914 – 14 May 1986) was an Italian road cyclist. As an amateur he won the road race at the 1934 national championships and finished third at the 1936 World Championships. He competed in the individual and team road race events at the 1936 Summer Olympics and placed seventh and fourth, respectively. After the Olympics he turned professional and won the Milano–Torino race in 1938–40 and Milan–San Remo race in 1941, finishing second in 1937–38 and 1942. He also won one stage in the 1940 Giro d'Italia.
