= Cino Cinelli =

Italian cyclist

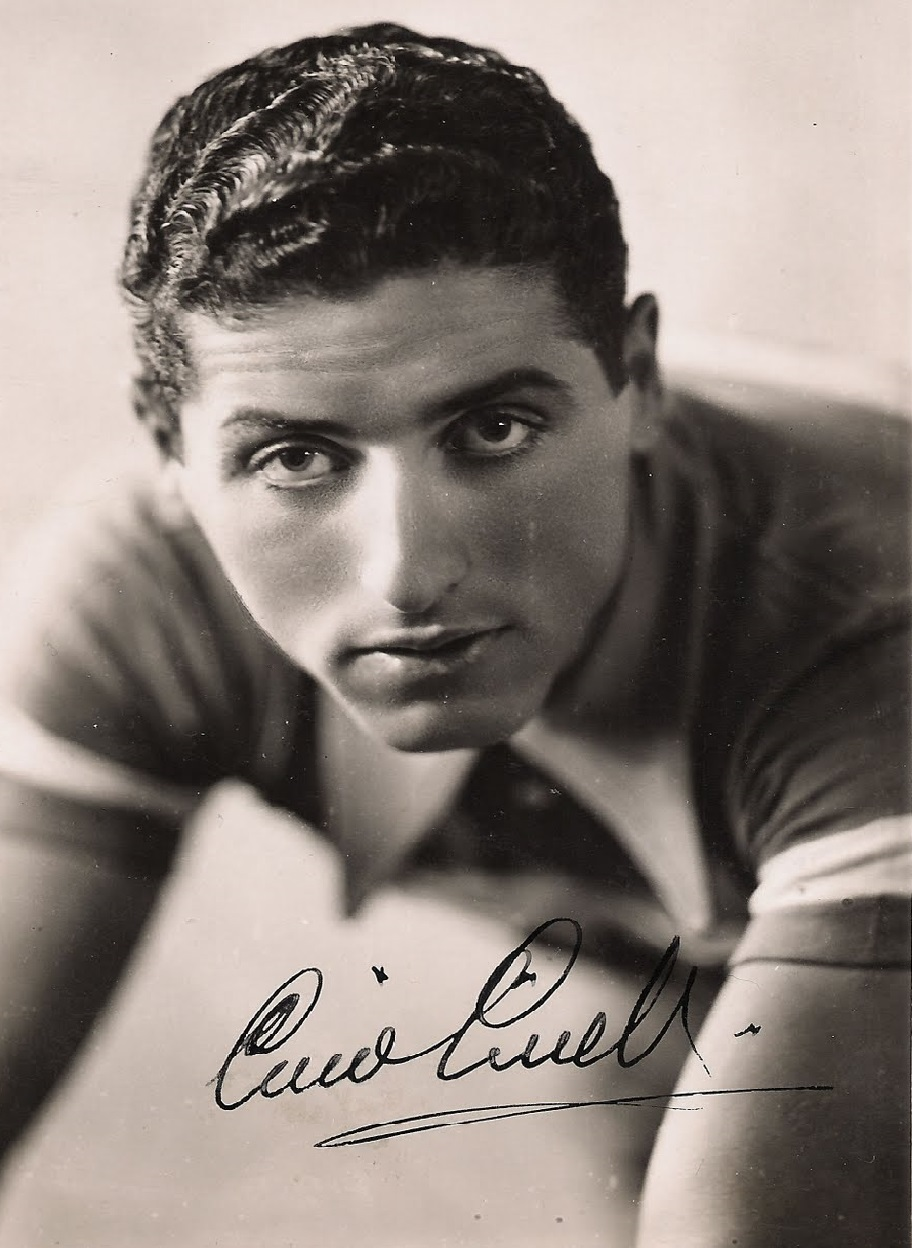
- Cino Cinelli, Italian cyclist, circa 1940

Personal information
- Full name: Cino Cinelli
- Born: 9 February 1916 Montespertoli, Florence, Italy
- Died: 20 April 2001 (aged 85) Montespertoli, Florence, Italy

Cycling career
- Sport: Cycling
- Discipline: Road
- Role: Rider

Amateur team
- 1937: –

Professional teams
- 1938–1939: Frejus
- 1940–1943: Bianchi
- 1944: Azzini US
- 1944: Benotto

Major wins
- One-day and classic races Giro dell'Appennino (1937) Giro di Lombardia (1938) Giro di Campania (1939) Giro del Piemonte (1940) Tre Valli Varesine (1940) Milan–San Remo (1943)

Cino Cinelli (9 February 1916 – 20 April 2001) was an Italian cyclist who won the 1938 Giro di Lombardia and the 1943 Milan–San Remo.

After retiring from professional cycling, he founded the Cinelli bicycle company.

== Palmarès ==
1937
1st Giro dell'Appennino
1938
1st Giro di Lombardia
1st Coppa Bernocchi
1st Stages 7b & 11 Giro d'Italia
1939
1st Giro di Campania
7th Milan–San Remo
9th Overall Giro d'Italia

1st Stage 3

1940
1st Tre Valli Varesine
1st Giro del Piemonte
2nd Coppa Bernocchi
3rd Giro di Lombardia
1941
2nd Giro di Lombardia
2nd Giro del Veneto
3rd Giro del Lazio
1942
3rd Giro dell'Emilia
1943
1st Milan–San Remo
