= Severino Canavesi =

Italian cyclist

Personal information
- Born: 27 January 1911 Gorla Maggiore
- Died: 30 January 1990 (aged 79) Gorla Maggiore

Cycling career
- Sport: Cycling
- Disciplines: Road, cyclo-cross
- Role: Rider

Severino Canavesi (27 January 1911 in Gorla Maggiore – 30 January 1990 in Gorla Maggiore) was an Italian cyclist.

== Major results ==
1929
1st Coppa San Geo
1934
1st National Cyclo-cross Championships
1st Tre Valli Varesine
3rd Coppa Bernocchi
1936
3rd Overall Giro d'Italia
1937
3rd Giro del Piemonte
4th Overall Giro d'Italia
1938
2nd Coppa Bernocchi
2nd Giro del Piemonte
2nd Tre Valli Varesine
3rd Overall Giro d'Italia
3rd Overall Tour de Suisse
1939
4th Overall Giro d'Italia
1941
1st Coppa Bernocchi
3rd Giro di Lombardia
3rd Giro della Provincia Milano
1945
1st National Road Race Championships
1948
2nd Giro dell'Appennino
3rd Giro di Campania
