= Gloria (cycling team) =

Cycling team

Team information
- Registered: Italy
- Founded: 1927
- Disbanded: 1943
- Discipline: Road
- Bicycles: Gloria

Team name history
- 1927 1929–1932 1933–1937 1938 1939–1942: Gloria; Gloria–Hutchinson; Gloria; Gloria–Ambrosiana; Gloria

Gloria was an Italian professional cycling team that existed in part between 1927 and 1943. Its main sponsor was Italian bicycle manufacturer Gloria. Francesco Camusso won the general classification of the 1931 Giro d'Italia with the team.
