= Olimpio Bizzi =

Italian cyclist (1916–1976)

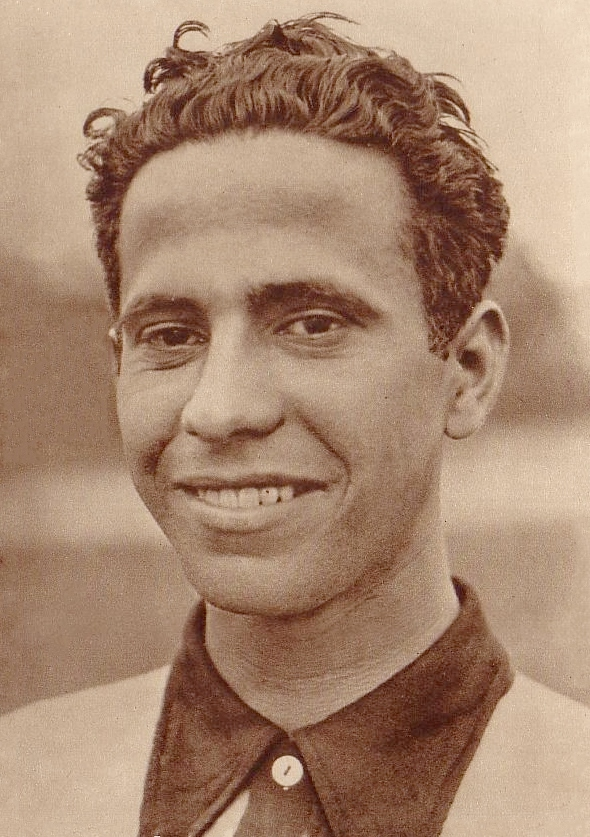
- Olimpio Bizzi c. 1937

Personal information
- Born: 1 August 1916 Livorno, Italy
- Died: 3 August 1976 (aged 60) Abetone, Italy

Cycling career
- Sport: Cycling
- Role: Rider

Olimpio Bizzi (1 August 1916 – 3 August 1976) was an Italian racing cyclist, who won 13 stages of Giro d'Italia in 1936–1946, as well as the 1950 Tour du Maroc. He rode the 1947 Tour de France, and placed sixth in the 1947 Paris–Roubaix.
