= 2026 Milan–San Remo Women =

Italian one-day cycling race

2026 Milano–Sanremo Donne
2026 UCI Women's World Tour, race 7 of 26
- Official event poster

Race details
- Dates: 21 March 2026
- Stages: 1
- Distance: 156 km (97 mi)
- Winning time: 3h 47' 17"

Results
	Winner	Lotte Kopecky (BEL)	(Team SD Worx–Protime)
	Second	Noemi Rüegg (SUI)	(EF Education–Oatly)
	Third	Eleonora Gasparrini (ITA)	(UAE Team ADQ)

The 2026 Milan–San Remo Women (officially Milano–Sanremo Donne) was a road cycling one-day race that took place on 21 March in north-western Italy. It was the ninth edition of the Milan–San Remo Women, and the seventh event of the 2026 UCI Women's World Tour.

The race was won by Belgian rider Lotte Kopecky of Team SD Worx–Protime in a sprint finish, after a group of five riders escaped on the Poggio di Sanremo climb. Several riders were involved in a dramatic crash on the Cipressa climb, with Debora Silvestri suffering five broken ribs and a fractured shoulder, and Katarzyna Niewiadoma-Phinney abandoning the race. Niewiadoma-Phinney later noted she was lucky to only have minor injuries.

== Route ==
The race used an identical route to the 2025 edition, with an overall race distance was 156 kilometres (97 mi). The last 140 kilometres (87 mi) of the course was identical to the men's race.

Starting in Genoa, the route of the race headed towards Sanremo along the coastal road with the scenery of the Ligurian Coast. In San Lorenzo al Mare, the course turned inwards to the Cipressa (5.6 km in length, average gradient of 4.1%), with its top at 22 km from the finish. After the towns of Santo Stefano al Mare and Arma di Taggia came the last climb, the Poggio di Sanremo (3.7 km in length, average gradient 3.6%). From the top of the Poggio, 5.4 km from the finish, the course headed down via a fast and curvy descent towards the center of Sanremo, where the race finished on the Via Roma, the city's shopping street.

== Teams ==
Twenty-four teams took part in the event, including fourteen UCI Women's WorldTeams, five UCI Women's ProTeams and five UCI Women's Continental teams.

UCI Women's WorldTeams

- Team SD Worx–Protime
- AG Insurance–Soudal
- Canyon//SRAM Zondacrypto
- EF Education–Oatly
- FDJ United–Suez
- Fenix–Premier Tech
- Human Powered Health
- Lidl–Trek
- Liv AlUla Jayco
- Movistar Team
- Team Picnic–PostNL
- Visma–Lease a Bike
- UAE Team ADQ
- Uno-X Mobility

UCI Women's ProTeams

- Cofidis
- Laboral Kutxa–Fundación Euskadi
- Mayenne Monbana My Pie
- St. Michel–Preference Home–Auber93
- VolkerWessels Cycling Team

UCI Women's Continental Teams

- Aromitalia Vaiano
- Isolmant–Premac–Vittoria
- Team Mendelspeck E-Work
- Top Girls Fassa Bortolo
- Vini Fantini–BePink

== Result ==
Result
Rank	Rider	Team	Time
1	Lotte Kopecky (BEL)	Team SD Worx–Protime	3h 47' 17"
2	Noemi Rüegg (SUI)	EF Education–Oatly	+ 0"
3	Eleonora Gasparrini (ITA)	UAE Team ADQ	+ 0"
4	Puck Pieterse (NED)	Fenix–Premier Tech	+ 0"
5	Dominika Włodarczyk (POL)	UAE Team ADQ	+ 4"
6	Lorena Wiebes (NED)	Team SD Worx–Protime	+ 9"
7	Ally Wollaston (NZL)	FDJ United–Suez	+ 9"
8	Elisa Balsamo (ITA)	Lidl–Trek	+ 9"
9	Charlotte Kool (NED)	Fenix–Premier Tech	+ 9"
10	Chiara Consonni (ITA)	Canyon//SRAM Zondacrypto	+ 9"
