= Milan–San Remo Women =

Women's professional road bicycle race

Milano–San Remo Donne

Race details
- Date: March
- Region: Liguria, Italy
- English name: Milan–San Remo Women
- Nickname(s): Primavera Rosa; Classicissima
- Discipline: Road
- Competition: UCI Women's Road World Cup (1999–2005); UCI Women's World Tour (2025–)
- Type: One-day race
- Organiser: RCS Sport
- Race director: Giusy Virelli
- Web site: www.milanosanremo.it

History
- First edition: 1999
- Editions: 9
- First winner: Sara Felloni (ITA)
- Most wins: Zoulfia Zabirova (RUS) (2 wins)
- Most recent: Lotte Kopecky (BEL)

Milan–San Remo Women, officially the Milano–San Remo Donne, is an elite women's professional one-day road bicycle race, held annually in March. It is part of the UCI Women's World Tour. The equivalent men's race is a cycling monument, considered to be one of the most prestigious one-day events in cycling. The race is held on the same day as the men's race, over a shorter distance but with an identical finish in Sanremo.

The race was first held in 1999 as Primavera Rosa as part of the UCI Women's Road World Cup, running for 7 editions before it was cancelled prior to the 2006 edition. In the 2020s, organisers discussed the potential of a women's race, with the Union Cycliste Internationale (UCI) announcing in 2024 that the race would join the 2025 UCI Women's World Tour.

== History ==
Milan–San Remo is one of cycling's oldest races (being first held in 1907), and considered to be one of the most prestigious one-day events in cycling. Held in early March, the race is the longest professional one-day race on the men's calendar, with a distance just under 300 kilometres (190 mi). The men's race is considered a "sprinters classic" because of its mainly flat course (although the Poggio climb close to the finish has often been an opportunity for puncheurs and rouleurs).

=== Primavera Rosa ===
In the late 1990s, the UCI requested that RCS Sport – the organisers of the men's race – hold a women's edition of Milan–San Remo. In 1999, the first edition of the race was held under the name Primavera Rosa, part of the UCI Women's Road World Cup. It was the first cycling monument to hold a women's edition. The route was around 120 kilometres (75 mi) in length, with the start not in Milan, but in Varazze – but an identical finish in Sanremo, including the Cipressa and Poggio climbs.

7 editions of the race were held between 1999 and 2005. Despite the men's race being considered a "sprinters classic", 4 editions of Primavera Rosa were won by a solo rider in a breakaway. Russian Zoulfia Zabirova was the only rider to win the race twice, in 2003 and 2004.

In January 2006, it was announced that the race had been cancelled, and the 2006 edition would not be held. Organisers noted the lack of financial interest in women's cycling, as well as the disruption caused by extended road closures as both men's and women's races were held on the same day.

=== Milano–San Remo Donne ===
In the late 2010s and early 2020s, major classic cycling races began staging women's editions – such as Liège–Bastogne–Liège Femmes (first held in 2017) and Paris–Roubaix Femmes (first held in 2021). In 2022, RCS Sport – organisers of the men's race – stated that they planned to organise a women's edition of Milan–San Remo in the future. Riders welcomed this, with Italian rider Marta Cavalli stating that she "would love to play out a big fight with all the riders from the WorldTour on the Poggio". In 2023, RCS Sport announced that a women's edition would be held from 2024.

In October 2024, the 2025 UCI Women's World Tour calendar was announced, with a women's edition of Milan–San Remo to take place on the same day as the men's race. To accommodate the race, the prestigious and long-standing Trofeo Alfredo Binda race shifted its date on the calendar. Following the announcement, Kasia Niewiadoma stated that the race would "raise the level even higher" in women's cycling. In March 2024, the route was announced, with a start in Genoa and a race length of 156 kilometres (97 mi), around half the length of the men's race.

Following her victory in 2025, Lorena Wiebes expressed her desire to lengthen the race in future, stating "it would be nice to race closer to 200km, if the rules allow it". Marianne Vos and multiple world champion Annemiek van Vleuten agreed that the race should be longer, with van Vleuten expressing her desire that the race "should be the longest one-day race ever for women's cycling" with a distance beyond the maximum race distance of 160 kilometres (99 mi) set by the UCI.

From 2026, the UCI will award more ranking points to Grand Tours and cycling monuments compared to other races in the UCI Women's World Tour – thereby officially designating the race as a cycling monument.

== Route ==
The route of the race heads towards Sanremo along the coastal road of the Ligurian Coast. In San Lorenzo al Mare, the course turns inwards to the Cipressa (5.6 km in length, average gradient of 4.1%), with its top at 22 km from the finish. After the towns of Santo Stefano al Mare and Arma di Taggia comes the last and most famous climb, the Poggio di Sanremo (3.7 km in length, average gradient 3.6%). From the top of the Poggio, 5.4 km from the finish, the course heads down via a fast and curvy descent towards the center of Sanremo, where the race finishes on the Via Roma shopping street.

The 1999 to 2005 editions of the race were around 120 kilometres (75 mi) in length, starting in Varazze and finishing in Sanremo. The 2025 and 2026 editions both started in Genoa, with a race distance of 156 kilometres (97 mi).

== Past winners ==
Year	Country	Rider	Team
1999	Italy	Sara Felloni	Acca Due O
2000	Lithuania	Diana Žiliūtė	Acca Due O - Lorena Camicie
2001	Sweden	Susanne Ljungskog	Vlaanderen–T Interim Ladies Team
2002	Netherlands	Mirjam Melchers-van Poppel	Team Farm Frites–Hartol
2003	Russia	Zoulfia Zabirova	Prato Marathon Bike
2004	Russia	Zoulfia Zabirova	Let's Go Finland
2005	Germany	Trixi Worrack	Equipe Nürnberger Versicherung
2006–2024	No race		
2025	Netherlands	Lorena Wiebes	Team SD Worx–Protime
2026	Belgium	Lotte Kopecky	Team SD Worx–Protime

=== Wins per country ===
Wins	Country
2	Netherlands; Russia
1	Belgium; Germany; Italy; Lithuania; Sweden
