= Milan–San Remo =

Italian one-day cycling race, and one of the five monuments

Milan–Sanremo

Race details
- Date: Mid-March
- Region: Northwest Italy
- English name: Milan–Sanremo
- Local name: Milano–Sanremo (in Italian)
- Nickname: La Classicissima di primavera (in Italian)
- Discipline: Road
- Competition: UCI World Tour
- Type: One-day cycling race
- Organiser: RCS Sport
- Race director: Mauro Vegni
- Web site: www.milanosanremo.it

History
- First edition: 1907
- Editions: 117 (as of 2026)
- First winner: Lucien Petit-Breton (FRA)
- Most wins: Eddy Merckx (BEL) (7 wins)
- Most recent: Tadej Pogačar (SLO)

Milan–Sanremo, also called "The Spring classic", is an annual road cycling race between Milan and Sanremo, in Northwest Italy. With a distance of 298 kilometres (185 mi), it is the longest professional one-day race in modern road cycling in Europe. It is the first major classic race of the season, usually held on the third Saturday of March. The first edition was held in 1907.

It is traditionally the first of the five Monuments of the season, considered to be one of the most prestigious one-day events in cycling. It was the opening race of the UCI Road World Cup series until the series was replaced by the UCI ProTour in 2005 and the World Tour in 2011.

The most successful rider with seven victories is Belgian Eddy Merckx. Italian Costante Girardengo achieved 11 podium finishes in the interwar period, winning the race six times. In modern times, German Erik Zabel and Spaniard Óscar Freire have recorded four and three wins respectively.

Milan–San Remo is considered a sprinters classic because of its mainly flat course (although the Cipressa and Poggio climbs close to the finish have often been an opportunity for puncheurs and rouleurs), whereas the other Italian Monument race, the Giro di Lombardia, held in autumn, is considered a climbers classic.

From 2025, Milan–San Remo Women was held after a 20-year hiatus. The event is organised on the same day albeit over a shorter distance and is part of the UCI Women's World Tour.

== History ==
=== The pioneering days ===
The idea of a bike race between Milan and Sanremo originated from the Unione Sportiva Sanremese. A first amateur race was held on 2 and 3 April 1906 over two stages (Milan–Acqui Terme and Acqui Terme–Sanremo); albeit with little success. Milanese journalist Tullo Morgagni, who had launched the Tour of Lombardy in 1905, put forth the idea of organizing a professional cycling race in a single day over the course. He proposed the project to Eugenio Costamagna, the director of the popular sports newspaper Gazzetta dello Sport, who took on the organization.

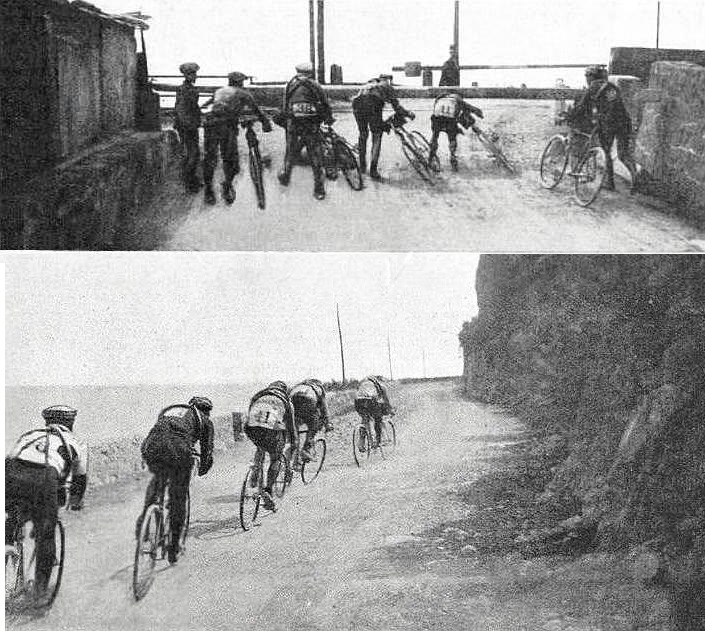
Footage from the 1914 Milan–San Remo. Top: riders crossing a closed railway passage. Bottom: lead group reaches the Ligurian Sea in Voltri.

On 14 April 1907 the first official edition of Milan–San Remo was held. The start was at the Conca Fallata inn of Milan at 5 a.m. Sixty riders registered, but only 33 took the start. The inaugural contest was especially hard as it was affected by exceptionally cold weather. It was won by Frenchman Lucien Petit-Breton, who completed the 286 kilometers (177 miles) in an average speed of 26.206 km/h (16.5 mph). Only 14 riders finished.

The race was a commercial success and attracted some of the best riders of European cycling, prompting the Gazzetta dello Sport to organize a second edition in 1908, won by Belgium's Cyrille Van Hauwaert. The first Italian winner of Milan–San Remo was Luigi Ganna who won in 1909 by an hour over Frenchman Emile Georget.

In 1910 the Primavera gained eternal fame and a place in cycling legend because of the extreme weather conditions. Riders needed to take refuge in the houses along the roads because a severe snowstorm scourged the peloton. Just four out of 63 riders finished the race. Frenchman Eugène Christophe won, even though he thought he had taken a wrong road and did not realize he was the first to reach Sanremo. Christophe finished the race in 12 hours and 24 minutes, making it the slowest edition ever. Giovanni Cocchi finished second at 1h 17 minutes from the winner.

=== La Classicissima ===
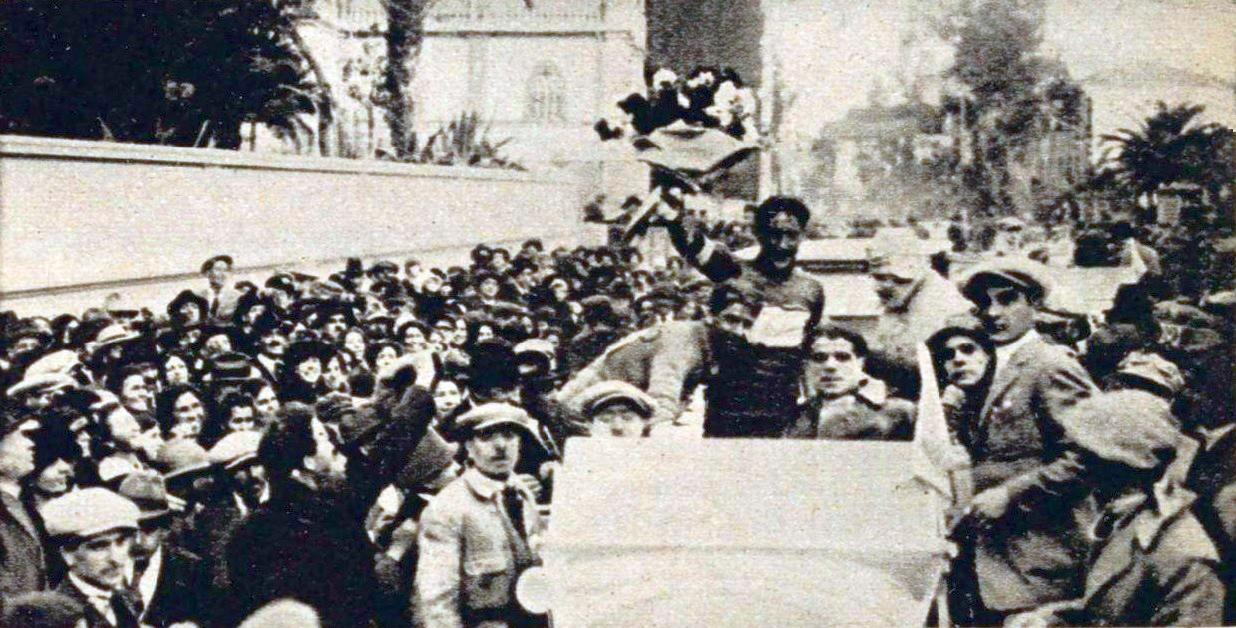
Costante Girardengo being honored for his win in the 1923 Milan–San Remo.

After the pioneering days of the race, began the era of Costante Girardengo, who connected his name indelibly to the classic. From 1917 to 1928 Girardengo had a record 11 podium finishes, six times as winner. Subsequent years were marked by the rivalry between Learco Guerra and Alfredo Binda, whose emulation caused them to lose several certain victories. A similar rivalry was the one in the 1940s with the mythical years of Fausto Coppi and Gino Bartali, whose duels were the subject of intense coverage and resulted in epic races.

Milan–San Remo was at the peak of its popularity and the Italian press started to coin the untranslatable term La Classicissima, the greatest of all classics. From 1935 to 1953 the race was run every year on 19 March, the feast of patron Saint Joseph, hence the press in predominantly Catholic Italy gave it its other nickname, la Gara di San Giuseppe (Saint Joseph's Race). In 1949 the race finished for the first time on the iconic Via Roma, a busy shopping street in the heart of Sanremo.

As from the 1950s the race was mainly won by Belgian and Spanish sprinters, and after 1953, Italian riders could not seal a victory for 17 years. In 1960 race director Vincenzo Torriani added the climb of the Poggio, just before the arrival in Sanremo. The intent was to make the race finale harder, but the decision did not have the aspired effect and the streak of non-Italian victories continued.

In 1966 began the legendary era of Eddy Merckx, who achieved an unsurpassed record of seven victories. Seven wins is also the record number of victories by a rider in a single classic to date. After the Cannibal's streak no rider could dominate Milan–San Remo again until 1997, when German Erik Zabel began a series of four victories and two second places.

=== The Sprinters Classic ===
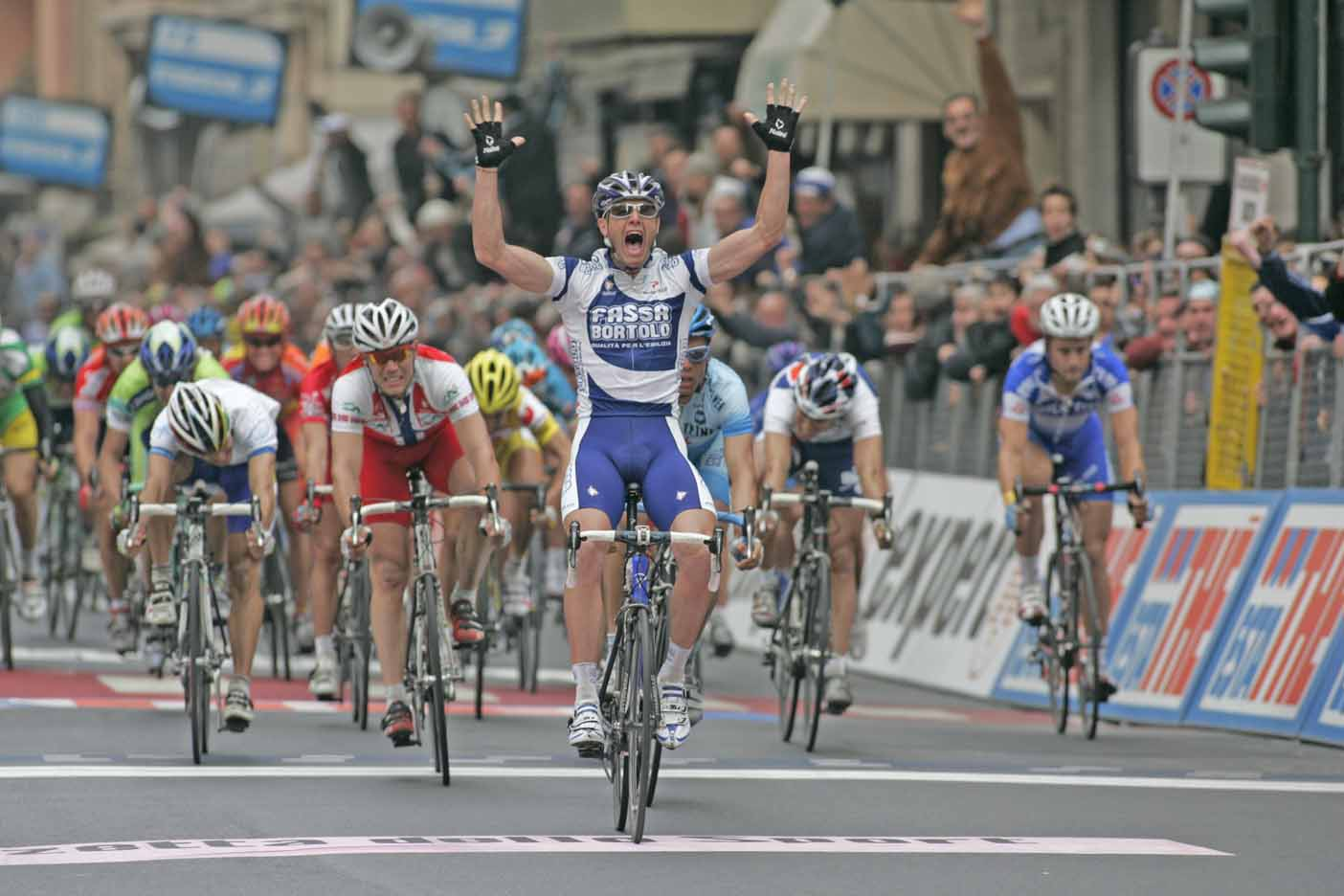
Italian Sprinter Alessandro Petacchi winning the 2005 Milan–San Remo in a group sprint on the Via Roma.

In 1990 Italian Gianni Bugno set a race record of 6h 25 m 06 seconds to win by 4 seconds over Rolf Gölz, averaging 45.8 kmh (28.45 mph). Another memorable running was the one in 1992, when Seán Kelly caught Moreno Argentin in the descent of the Poggio and beat the Italian in a two-man sprint. It was Kelly's penultimate career win. In between Erik Zabel's wins, Andrei Tchmil won the 1999 contest, after he launched a decisive attack under the one-kilometer banner and narrowly stayed ahead of the sprinting peloton, with Zabel coming in second place.

In 2004 Zabel could have won a fifth time, but lost to Óscar Freire only because he lifted his arms to celebrate and stopped pedalling too early. Freire would go on to secure a total of three Primavera wins in later years. In 2008 the finish was moved to a different location for the first time in 59 years, due to road works on the Via Roma. Swiss Fabian Cancellara was the first winner on the Lungomare Italo Calvino, after an ultimate solo attack in the streets of San Remo.

In 2009 the 100th edition of Milan–San Remo was held, won by British sprinter Mark Cavendish on his first attempt. Cavendish beat Australian Heinrich Haussler in a millimeter sprint.

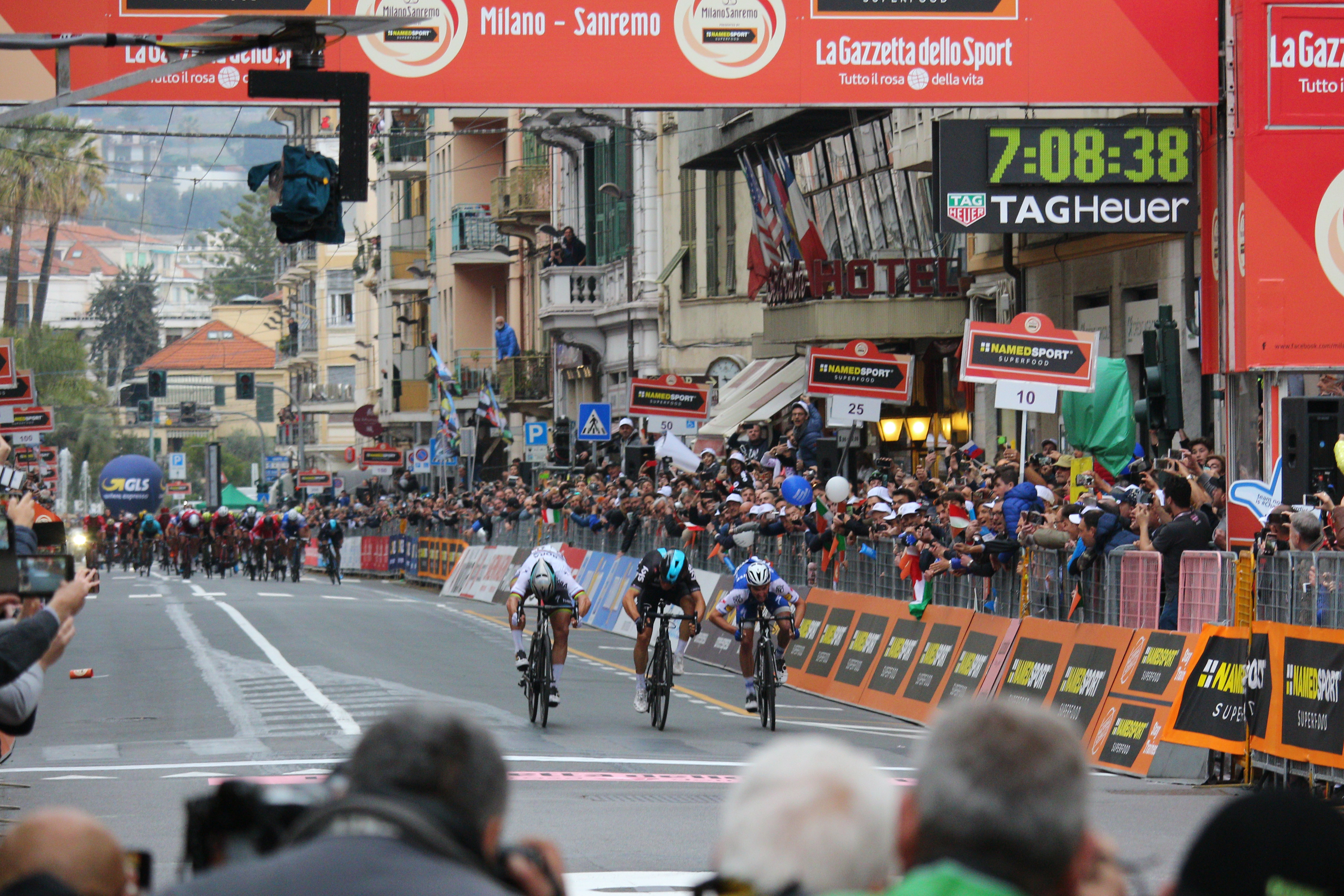
Michał Kwiatkowski won the 2017 contest in a three-man sprint with Peter Sagan and Julian Alaphilippe.

The race of 2013 was affected by abysmal weather conditions from start to finish. Heavy snowfall and below-zero temperatures forced organizers to shorten the race by 52 kilometres (32 miles) eliminating two key climbs – the Passo del Turchino and Le Manie – and arranging a bus transfer for the race to begin a second time. The race was won by German Gerald Ciolek who outsprinted Peter Sagan and Fabian Cancellara.

In 2015 race director Mauro Vegni decided to move the finish back to the Via Roma after seven years on the seaside, stating the change would be for 2015 and beyond. German John Degenkolb won the race ahead of previous winner Alexander Kristoff. The 2016 race was won by French sprinter Arnaud Démare in a bunch sprint, but Démare was accused after the race of having used the tow of his teamcar to rejoin the pack on the Cipressa climb. Démare rebuffed these allegations, stating that the race commissioners were right behind him and would have disqualified him had he done something illegal. (Note: On 8 May 2016, it became public that the Italian Cycling Federation was making inquiries into the accusations about Démare. Matteo Tosatto, one of the riders who accused Démare, stated that he had given written testimony to officials about the incident.)

In 2017 Michał Kwiatkowski became the first Polish winner of a monument in a three-up sprint finish with world champion Peter Sagan and Julian Alaphilippe after the trio broke clear on the race's final climb – the Poggio di San Remo.

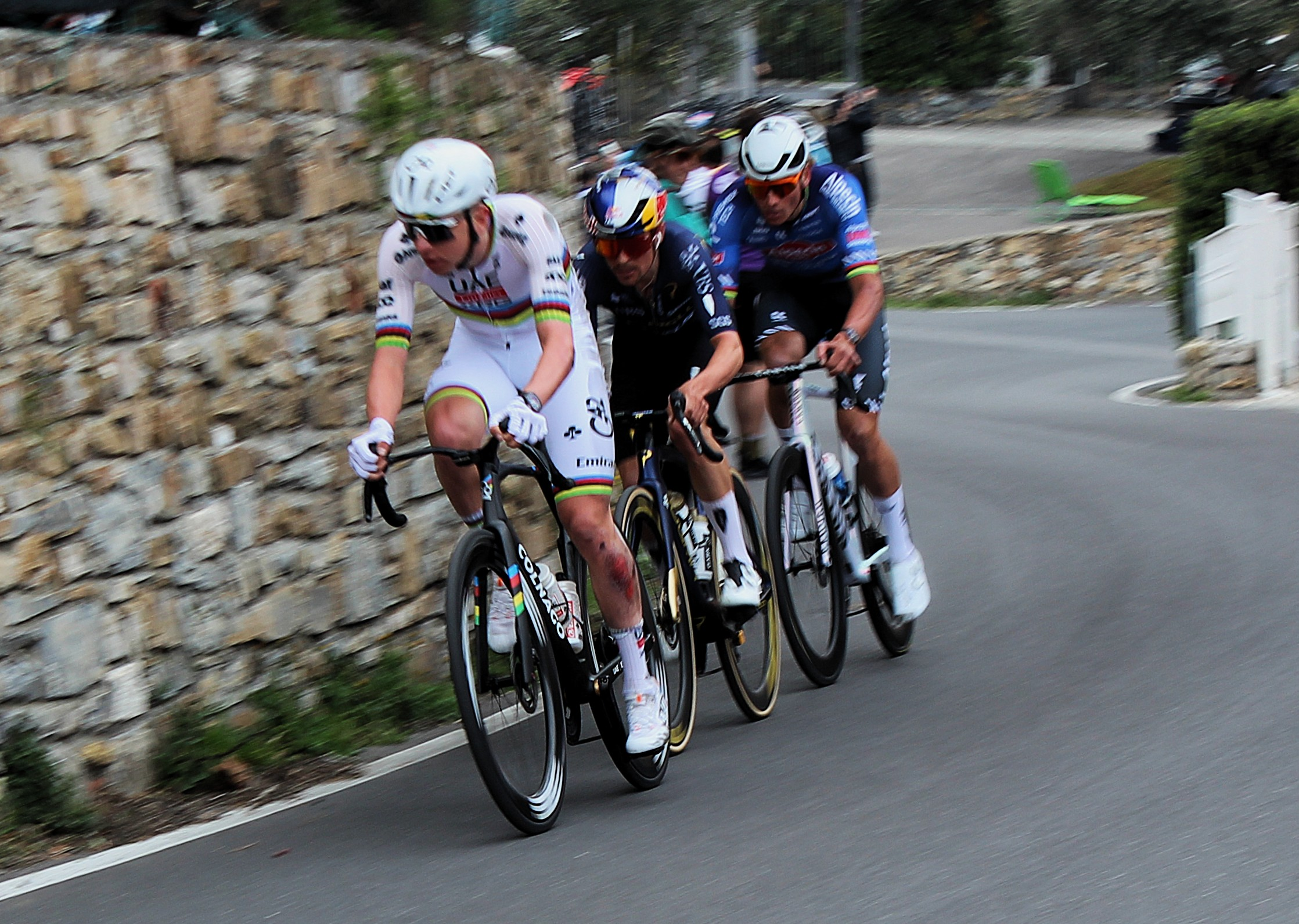
Tadej Pogačar, Tom Pidcock and Mathieu van der Poel on the Cipressa climb at the 2026 edition of the race

The 2020 edition was forced to move to August due to the COVID-19 pandemic in Italy, making it the first ever summer edition of the Spring classic. The edition was won by Belgian Wout van Aert. In 2024, the race underwent notable route changes, notably featuring a new start destination in Pavia, located just outside of Milan.

In 2025, the race was won by Dutch rider Mathieu van der Poel for the second time, beating Italian Filippo Ganna and Slovenian world champion Tadej Pogačar in a sprint finish – with L'Équipe calling the race "one of the most memorable 'Primaveras'", and Cycling Weekly stating the race had been "an epic duel". On the Cipressa, the trio broke the climbing record by 20 seconds, previously set by Gabriele Colombo and Alexander Gontchenkov at the 1996 Milan–San Remo.

In 2026, the race was won by Pogačar for the first time in a sprint finish, after four consecutive top-five finishes. The victory marked Pogačar's eleventh in a Monument, tying Roger De Vlaeminck's tally for the second-most Monument wins.

== Route ==
=== Present course ===
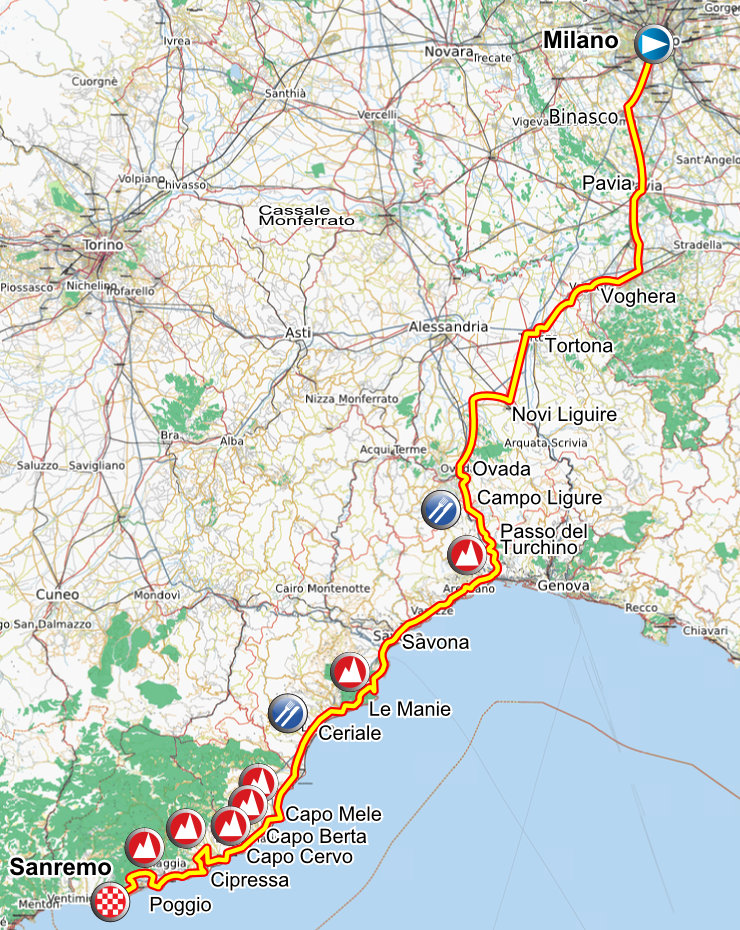
Route of the 2011 edition

Upon its inception, Milan–San Remo was conceived as a straightforward line from Milan, the industrial heart of Northern Italy, to San Remo, the fashionable seaside resort on the Italian Riviera with its trademark Belle Epoque villas. The race starts on the Piazza del Duomo in the heart of Milan and immediately heads to the southwest, over the plains of Lombardy and Piedmont, along the cities of Pavia, Voghera, Tortona, Novi Ligure and Ovada. As the race enters Liguria, the peloton addresses the Passo del Turchino, the first climb of the day, after 140 km.

After the descent of the Turchino the race reaches the Ligurian Sea in Voltri at halfway point. From here the course follows the Aurelia highway to the west, with its spectacular and typical scenery along the Ligurian Coast. The race crosses the towns of Arenzano, Varazze, Savona, Finale Ligure, Pietra Ligure, Loano, Borghetto Santo Spirito, Ceriale and Albenga, followed by the seaside resorts along the Riviera dei Fiori (Alassio, Andora, Diano Marina and Imperia). Between Alassio and Imperia, three short hills along the coast are included: the Capo Mele, Capo Cervo and Capo Berta. In San Lorenzo al Mare the course turns inwards to the Cipressa, the next climb, with its top at 22 km from the finish. After the towns of Santo Stefano al Mare and Arma di Taggia comes the last and most famous climb, the Poggio di Sanremo, in fact a suburb of Sanremo, built upon a hill along the sea.

From the top of the Poggio, 5.4 km from the finish, the course heads down via a fast and curvy descent towards the center of Sanremo, where the race traditionally finishes on the Via Roma, the city's illustrious shopping street.

=== Race characteristics ===
Being the longest professional one-day race, Milan–San Remo is an unusual test of endurance early in the season. It is often won not by the fastest sprinter, but by the strongest and best prepared rider with a strong sprint finish. The Cipressa and Poggio have foiled many sprinters who could not stay with the front group.

Profile of the 2015 edition

In the early years the only significant difficulty was the Passo del Turchino, which was often a pivotal site of the race – but when cycling became more professional, the climb was not demanding enough and too far from the finish to be decisive. In 1960 the Poggio, a 4 km climb just a few kilometres before the finish, was introduced. In 1982 the Cipressa, near Imperia, was added. The other hills are the Capo Mele, Capo Cervo and Capo Berta. From 2008 to 2014 the organizers added the climb of Le Manie as well, between the Turchino and the Capi. The Turchino and Le Manie are longer climbs, meant to cause a first selection in the peloton, while the Capi, Cipressa and Poggio are rather short, inviting attackers to distance the peloton.

In recent years there has rarely been a big selection in the latter stages of the race. Many sprinters are able to keep up with the main peloton on the climbs, and therefore the race most often ends in a group sprint. Nonetheless, the location of the Poggio close to the finish has often meant that riders' position on top of the Poggio is crucial in order to win the race.

Despite its flat course and long finishing straight, sprinters' teams have been foiled from time to time by a determined attack on the last hills. Good examples include Laurent Jalabert and Maurizio Fondriest escaping in 1995 and staying ahead to the finish. In 2003, Paolo Bettini attacked with Luca Paolini and Mirko Celestino to stay ahead. In 2012, Vincenzo Nibali and Fabian Cancellara attacked on the Poggio, followed by Australian Simon Gerrans, who outsprinted them at the finish. In 2018, Nibali attacked on the final bends of the Poggio, resisting the return of the group to win by a small margin.

=== Proposed changes ===
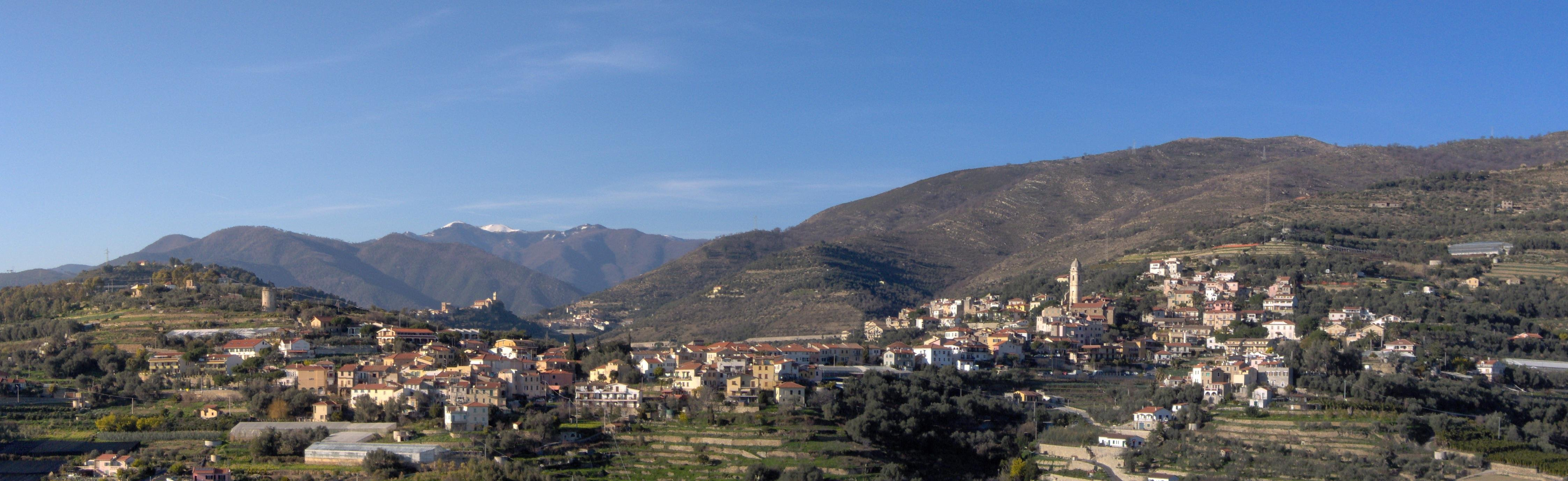
View on Pompeiana, a proposed new site for Milan–San Remo

Milan–San Remo has had few significant course changes since its first edition, and organizers have made it a matter of honour to stay true to the original intent.

In 2008, the Le Manie climb was added to the route. In September 2013, organiser RCS Sport announced the race would include the Pompeiana climb between the Cipressa and Poggio. To keep the race at a reasonable distance, it would exclude Le Manie. The Pompeiana, named after the village the road passes, climbs five kilometres with a 13% maximum gradient, and would therefore be the most difficult climb in the race finale. The proposed route was reversed just weeks before the race in March 2014, when the Pompeiana had been damaged by recent landslides, making it too dangerous for a cycling race to pass. Hence the race was re-routed and made more traditional and sprinter-friendly. This led to a number of sprinters, who had earlier ruled themselves out due to the addition of the extra climb, including Mark Cavendish, declaring their interest in riding again.

In 2015, the climb of Le Manie was cut from the race, and neither was the Pompeiana included in the trajectory. With this pre-2008 route, race organizers stated they want to respect the race's traditional course.

In 2023, the start of the race moved to Abbiategrasso. In 2024, the race underwent notable route changes, notably featuring a new start destination in Pavia, located just outside of Milan.

=== 2020 edition ===
The 2020 edition, already extraordinary in being held in the midst of summer, followed a new route. This was due to the extraordinary conditions determined first by the COVID-19 pandemic, and then by the sudden refusal, just a few weeks before the race, by the mayors of several seaside town to let the race pass through the coastal highway, or "Via Aurelia", heavily engaged by tourist traffic in August whereas it is much less suffocated by it in March, the usual racing time. The race ended up being 306 km long, with a heavy detour through the Langhe hills and the Tanaro river valley before reaching the western Ligurian coast through the Col di Nava pass and the Colle San Bartolomeo tunnel, only reaching the usual route at Imperia.

== Winners ==
Year	Country	Rider	Team
1907	France	Lucien Petit-Breton	Bianchi
1908	Belgium	Cyrille van Hauwaert	Alcyon–Dunlop
1909	Italy	Luigi Ganna	Atala–Dunlop
1910	France	Eugène Christophe	Alcyon–Dunlop
1911	France	Gustave Garrigou	Alcyon–Dunlop
1912	France	Henri Pélissier	Alcyon–Dunlop
1913	Belgium	Odile Defraye	Alcyon–Soly
1914	Italy	Ugo Agostoni	Bianchi–Dei
1915	Italy	Ezio Corlaita	Dei
1916	No race due to World War I		
1917	Italy	Gaetano Belloni	Bianchi
1918	Italy	Costante Girardengo	Bianchi
1919	Italy	Angelo Gremo	Stucchi–Dunlop
1920	Italy	Gaetano Belloni	Bianchi
1921	Italy	Costante Girardengo	Stucchi–Pirelli
1922	Italy	Giovanni Brunero	Legnano–Pirelli
1923	Italy	Costante Girardengo	Maino
1924	Italy	Pietro Linari	Legnano–Pirelli
1925	Italy	Costante Girardengo	Wolsit–Pirelli
1926	Italy	Costante Girardengo	Wolsit–Pirelli
1927	Italy	Pietro Chesi	Ives-Pirelli
1928	Italy	Costante Girardengo	Maino–Dunlop
1929	Italy	Alfredo Binda	Legnano–Torpedo
1930	Italy	Michele Mara	Bianchi
1931	Italy	Alfredo Binda	Legnano–Hutchinson
1932	Italy	Alfredo Bovet	Bianchi
1933	Italy	Learco Guerra	Maino–Clément
1934	Belgium	Jef Demuysere	Genial Lucifer–Hutchinson
1935	Italy	Giuseppe Olmo	Bianchi
1936	Italy	Angelo Varetto	Gloria
1937	Italy	Cesare Del Cancia	Ganna
1938	Italy	Giuseppe Olmo	Bianchi
1939	Italy	Gino Bartali	Legnano
1940	Italy	Gino Bartali	Legnano
1941	Italy	Pierino Favalli	Legnano
1942	Italy	Adolfo Leoni	Bianchi
1943	Italy	Cino Cinelli	Bianchi
1944	No race due to World War II		
1945	No race due to World War II		
1946	Italy	Fausto Coppi	Bianchi
1947	Italy	Gino Bartali	Legnano–Pirelli
1948	Italy	Fausto Coppi	Bianchi
1949	Italy	Fausto Coppi	Bianchi–Ursus
1950	Italy	Gino Bartali	Bartali–Gardiol
1951	France	Louison Bobet	Stella
1952	Italy	Loretto Petrucci	Bianchi–Pirelli
1953	Italy	Loretto Petrucci	Bianchi–Pirelli
1954	Belgium	Rik Van Steenbergen	Mercier–BP–Hutchinson
1955	Belgium	Germain Derijcke	Alcyon–Dunlop
1956	Belgium	Fred De Bruyne	Mercier–BP–Hutchinson
1957	Spain	Miguel Poblet	Ignis–Doniselli
1958	Belgium	Rik Van Looy	Faema–Guerra
1959	Spain	Miguel Poblet	Ignis–Frejus
1960	France	René Privat	Mercier–BP–Hutchinson
1961	France	Raymond Poulidor	Mercier–BP–Hutchinson
1962	Belgium	Emile Daems	Philco
1963	France	Joseph Groussard	Pelforth–Sauvage–Lejeune
1964	Great Britain	Tom Simpson	Peugeot–BP–Englebert
1965	Netherlands	Arie den Hartog	Ford France–Gitane
1966	Belgium	Eddy Merckx	Peugeot–Dunlop
1967	Belgium	Eddy Merckx	Peugeot–BP–Michelin
1968	West Germany	Rudi Altig	Salvarani
1969	Belgium	Eddy Merckx	Faema
1970	Italy	Michele Dancelli	Molteni
1971	Belgium	Eddy Merckx	Molteni
1972	Belgium	Eddy Merckx	Molteni
1973	Belgium	Roger De Vlaeminck	Brooklyn
1974	Italy	Felice Gimondi	Bianchi–Campagnolo
1975	Belgium	Eddy Merckx	Molteni–RYC
1976	Belgium	Eddy Merckx	Molteni–Campagnolo
1977	Netherlands	Jan Raas	Frisol–Thirion–Gazelle
1978	Belgium	Roger De Vlaeminck	Sanson–Campagnolo
1979	Belgium	Roger De Vlaeminck	Gis Gelati
1980	Italy	Pierino Gavazzi	Magniflex–Olmo
1981	Belgium	Alfons De Wolf	Vermeer Thijs
1982	France	Marc Gomez	Wolber–Spidel
1983	Italy	Giuseppe Saronni	Del Tongo–Colnago
1984	Italy	Francesco Moser	Gis Gelati–Tuc Lu
1985	Netherlands	Hennie Kuiper	Verandalux–Dries
1986	Ireland	Sean Kelly	Kas
1987	Switzerland	Erich Maechler	Carrera Jeans–Vagabond
1988	France	Laurent Fignon	Système U–Gitane
1989	France	Laurent Fignon	Super U–Raleigh–Fiat
1990	Italy	Gianni Bugno	Chateau d'Ax–Salotti
1991	Italy	Claudio Chiappucci	Carrera Jeans–Tassoni
1992	Ireland	Sean Kelly	Lotus–Festina
1993	Italy	Maurizio Fondriest	Lampre–Polti
1994	Italy	Giorgio Furlan	Gewiss–Ballan
1995	France	Laurent Jalabert	ONCE
1996	Italy	Gabriele Colombo	Gewiss Playbus
1997	Germany	Erik Zabel	Team Telekom
1998	Germany	Erik Zabel	Team Telekom
1999	Belgium	Andrei Tchmil	Lotto–Mobistar
2000	Germany	Erik Zabel	Team Telekom
2001	Germany	Erik Zabel	Team Telekom
2002	Italy	Mario Cipollini	Acqua & Sapone–Cantina Tollo
2003	Italy	Paolo Bettini	Quick-Step–Davitamon
2004	Spain	Óscar Freire	Rabobank
2005	Italy	Alessandro Petacchi	Fassa Bortolo
2006	Italy	Filippo Pozzato	Quick-Step–Innergetic
2007	Spain	Óscar Freire	Rabobank
2008	Switzerland	Fabian Cancellara	Team CSC
2009	Great Britain	Mark Cavendish	Team Columbia–High Road
2010	Spain	Óscar Freire	Rabobank
2011	Australia	Matthew Goss	HTC–Highroad
2012	Australia	Simon Gerrans	GreenEDGE
2013	Germany	Gerald Ciolek	MTN–Qhubeka
2014	Norway	Alexander Kristoff	Team Katusha
2015	Germany	John Degenkolb	Team Giant–Alpecin
2016	France	Arnaud Démare	FDJ
2017	Poland	Michał Kwiatkowski	Team Sky
2018	Italy	Vincenzo Nibali	Bahrain–Merida
2019	France	Julian Alaphilippe	Deceuninck–Quick-Step
2020	Belgium	Wout van Aert	Team Jumbo–Visma
2021	Belgium	Jasper Stuyven	Trek–Segafredo
2022	Slovenia	Matej Mohorič	Team Bahrain Victorious
2023	Netherlands	Mathieu van der Poel	Alpecin–Deceuninck
2024	Belgium	Jasper Philipsen	Alpecin–Deceuninck
2025	Netherlands	Mathieu van der Poel	Alpecin–Deceuninck
2026	Slovenia	Tadej Pogačar	UAE Team Emirates XRG

=== Most wins ===
Riders in italics are still active

Wins	Rider	Editions
7	Eddy Merckx (BEL)	1966, 1967, 1969, 1971, 1972, 1975, 1976
6	Costante Girardengo (ITA)	1918, 1921, 1923, 1925, 1926, 1928
4	Gino Bartali (ITA)	1939, 1940, 1947, 1950
4	Erik Zabel (GER)	1997, 1998, 2000, 2001
3	Fausto Coppi (ITA)	1946, 1948, 1949
3	Roger De Vlaeminck (BEL)	1973, 1978, 1979
3	Óscar Freire (ESP)	2004, 2007, 2010
2	Gaetano Belloni (ITA)	1917, 1920
2	Alfredo Binda (ITA)	1929, 1931
2	Giuseppe Olmo (ITA)	1935, 1938
2	Loretto Petrucci (ITA)	1952, 1953
2	Miguel Poblet (ESP)	1957, 1959
2	Laurent Fignon (FRA)	1988, 1989
2	Seán Kelly (IRL)	1986, 1992
2	Mathieu van der Poel (NED)	2023, 2025

=== Wins per country ===
Wins	Country
51	Italy
23	Belgium
14	France
7	Germany (including West Germany)
5	Netherlands; Spain
2	Australia; Great Britain; Ireland; Slovenia; Switzerland
1	Norway; Poland

== Women's race ==
From 1999 to 2005 seven editions of Primavera Rosa were held. The race was organized on the same day and finished in Sanremo shortly before the men, but covered a shorter distance. The start was not in Milan, but in Varazze. It was part of the UCI Women's Road World Cup. The 2006 edition was initially planned but cancelled before the event. Russian Zoulfia Zabirova was the only rider to win twice.

In 2023, RCS Sport announced that a women's edition of the race would be held from 2024. From 2025, Milano–San Remo Donne was held as part of the UCI Women's World Tour over a shorter distance on the same day as the men's race.

== Granfondo Milano-Sanremo ==
The Granfondo Milano-Sanremo is an annual cyclosportive event for recreational cyclists over the same course as the professional race from Milan to San Remo. It is one of the oldest Granfondos in Italy, founded in 1971 by the Unione Cicloturistica Sanremo and popular among cyclotourists from all over the world. It is currently held the second Sunday in June and 2021 (postponed from 2020) was its 50th edition.

== In popular culture ==
- The race features in the 1980 Italian comedy film Fantozzi contro tutti.
- The 1910 race is the subject of the 2006 graphic novel "La Primavera" by Alexis Frederick-Frost.
