= 2025 Milan–San Remo Women =

Italian one-day cycling race

2025 Milano–Sanremo Donne
2025 UCI Women's World Tour, race 7 of 27
- Official event poster

Race details
- Dates: 22 March 2025
- Stages: 1
- Distance: 156 km (97 mi)
- Winning time: 3h 43' 32"

Results
	Winner	Lorena Wiebes (NED)	(Team SD Worx–Protime)
	Second	Marianne Vos (NED)	(Visma–Lease a Bike)
	Third	Noemi Rüegg (SUI)	(EF Education–Oatly)

The 2025 Milan–San Remo Women (officially Milano–Sanremo Donne) was a road cycling one-day race that took place on 22 March in north-western Italy. It was the 8th edition of the Milan–San Remo Women, and the 7th event of the 2025 UCI Women's World Tour. The race was the first women's Milan–San Remo to be held since the 2005 Primavera Rosa.

The race was won by Dutch rider Lorena Wiebes of Team SD Worx–Protime in a sprint finish, after a successful chase to catch Italian rider Elisa Longo Borghini of UAE Team ADQ in the final kilometres.

== Route ==
Starting in Genoa, the route of the race headed towards Sanremo along the coastal road with the spectacular scenery of the Ligurian Coast. In San Lorenzo al Mare, the course turned inwards to the Cipressa (5.6 km in length, average gradient of 4.1%), with its top at 22 km from the finish. After the towns of Santo Stefano al Mare and Arma di Taggia came the last and most famous climb, the Poggio di Sanremo (3.7 km in length, average gradient 3.6%). From the top of the Poggio, 5.4 km from the finish, the course headed down via a fast and curvy descent towards the center of Sanremo, where the race finishes on the Via Roma, the city's shopping street.

The overall race distance was 156 kilometres (97 mi), with the last 140 kilometres (87 mi) of the course identical to the men's race.

== Teams ==
Twenty-four teams took part in the event, including fifteen UCI Women's WorldTeams, four UCI Women's ProTeams and five UCI Women's Continental teams.

UCI Women's WorldTeams

- AG Insurance–Soudal
- Canyon//SRAM zondacrypto
- Ceratizit Pro Cycling
- FDJ–Suez
- Fenix–Deceuninck
- Human Powered Health
- Lidl–Trek
- Liv AlUla Jayco
- Movistar Team
- Roland
- Team Picnic–PostNL
- Team SD Worx–Protime
- UAE Team ADQ
- Uno-X Mobility
- Visma–Lease a Bike

UCI Women's ProTeams

- Cofidis
- EF Education–Oatly
- Laboral Kutxa–Fundación Euskadi
- VolkerWessels Cycling Team

UCI Women's Continental Teams

- Aromitalia 3T Vaiano
- BePink–Imatra–Bongioanni
- Isolmant–Premac–Vittoria
- Team Mendelspeck E-Work
- Top Girls Fassa Bortolo

== Race summary ==
Before the race, media noted that no rider had experienced the race, with riders like Marianne Vos too young to have competed in the 2005 race. Contenders for the win included world champion Lotte Kopecky, European champion Lorena Wiebes, Elisa Balsamo, Elisa Longo Borghini, Demi Vollering and Vos.

With around 4 kilometres (2.5 mi) remaining, Italian rider Elisa Longo Borghini of UAE Team ADQ attacked after the descent of the Poggio, rapidly gaining a small lead. Team SD Worx–Protime teammates Wiebes and Kopecky worked together with other riders including Marianne Vos of Visma–Lease a Bike to catch Longo Borghini with around 250 metres remaining. In the final sprint, Vos initially led before Wiebes kicked to take victory, her first UCI Women's World Tour win of the season. Pauline Ferrand-Prévot (Visma–Lease a Bike) was subsequently relegated from 4th place after she was deemed to have "deviated from her line" in the sprint finish.

Following the race, Wiebes stated the win was "one of my best" of her career, with Longo Borghini stating that "next time they're not going to catch me". Wiebes expressed her desire to lengthen the race in future, stating "it would be nice to race closer to 200km, if the rules allow it". Vos and 10th place finisher Puck Pieterse agreed that the race should be longer, with Pieterse noting that the peloton "arrived reasonably fresh" at the bottom of the Poggio. Vollering noted her disappointment that the prize fund for the race was just 11% of the men, with €2,256 awarded for 1st place (compared to €20,000 for the men's race).

== Result ==
Result
Rank	Rider	Team	Time
1	Lorena Wiebes (NED)	Team SD Worx–Protime	3h 43' 32"
2	Marianne Vos (NED)	Visma–Lease a Bike	+ 0"
3	Noemi Rüegg (SUI)	EF Education–Oatly	+ 0"
4	Demi Vollering (NED)	FDJ–Suez	+ 0"
5	Kimberley Le Court (MRI)	AG Insurance–Soudal	+ 0"
6	Chloé Dygert (USA)	Canyon//SRAM zondacrypto	+ 0"
7	Elisa Balsamo (ITA)	Lidl–Trek	+ 0"
8	Juliette Labous (FRA)	FDJ–Suez	+ 0"
9	Lotte Kopecky (BEL)	Team SD Worx–Protime	+ 0"
10	Puck Pieterse (NED)	Fenix–Deceuninck	+ 0"
