= 2014 Milan–San Remo =

2014 UCI World Tour, race 4 of 30
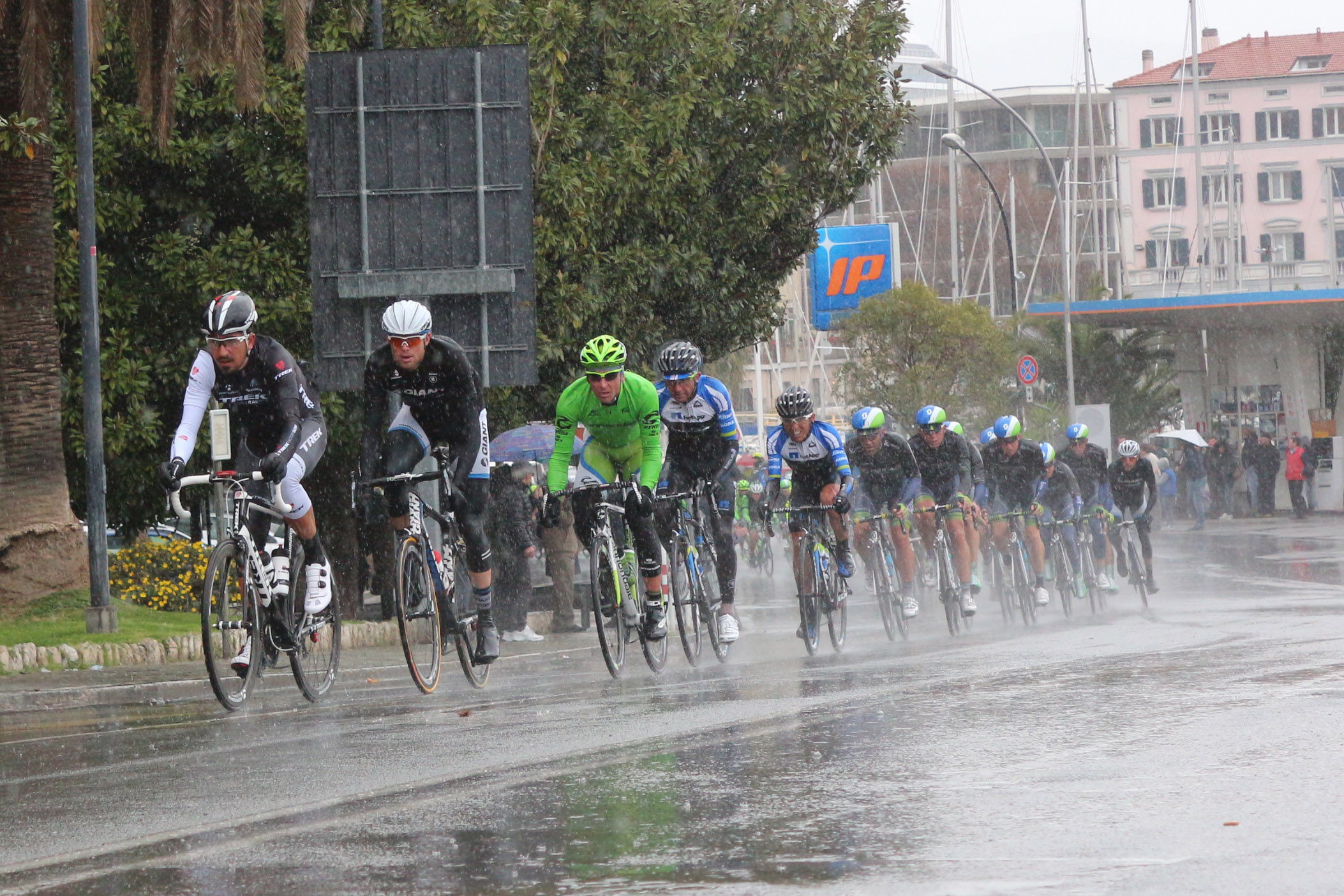
- The peloton in Savona

Race details
- Dates: 23 March
- Stages: 1
- Distance: 294 km (183 mi)
- Winning time: 6h 55' 56"

Results
	Winner	Alexander Kristoff (NOR)	(Team Katusha)
	Second	Fabian Cancellara (SUI)	(Trek Factory Racing)
	Third	Ben Swift (GBR)	(Team Sky)

The 2014 Milan–San Remo was the 105th running of the Milan–San Remo single-day monument classic cycling race. It was held on Sunday 23 March over a distance of 294 kilometres (182.7 miles) and was the fourth race of the 2014 UCI World Tour season. It was won in the sprint by Alexander Kristoff, ahead of Fabian Cancellara and Ben Swift.

== Route and pre-race favourites ==
Race organisers initially introduced major changes to the route for the 2014 edition of the race, with the new Pompeiana climb being introduced between the existing Cipressa and Poggio climbs in the climax of the race, although the earlier climb of Le Mànie was taken out. This was seen to tip the balance of the race in favour of puncheurs and climbers rather than sprinters, with many sprinters including 2009 winner Mark Cavendish (Omega Pharma–Quick-Step) stating they would not compete. However, in February 2014 race organisers announced the new climb would not be used after all, due to poor weather conditions.

With no replacement climb, the route now resembled that of the 2007 edition, and seemed to now favour sprinters due to a flatter route than in previous years. Subsequently, the likes of Cavendish and André Greipel (Lotto–Belisol) decided they would compete in the first monument of the season. Peter Sagan of Cannondale was seen as one of the top favourites going into the race, due to his all round sprinting and hill climbing abilities. Cavendish, Greipel and Giant–Shimano's John Degenkolb were considered favourites should the race end in a bunch sprint, whilst the likes of Fabian Cancellara (Trek Factory Racing), Philippe Gilbert of the BMC Racing Team, Orica–GreenEDGE's Simon Gerrans and Tom-Jelte Slagter of Garmin–Sharp would be looking to set up victory by dropping the sprinters on the final climbs. Gerrans did not start the race, after being ruled out the day before due to illness.

== Teams ==
As Milan–San Remo was a UCI World Tour event, all 18 UCI ProTeams were invited automatically and obligated to send a squad. Seven other squads were given wildcard places to the race, completing the 25-team peloton

The 25 teams that competed in the race were:

- Ag2r–La Mondiale
- Androni Giocattoli–Venezuela
- Astana
- Bardiani–CSF
- Belkin Pro Cycling
- BMC Racing Team
- Cannondale
- Team Europcar
- FDJ.fr
- Garmin–Sharp
- Giant–Shimano
- IAM Cycling
- Team Katusha
- Lampre–Merida
- Lotto–Belisol
- Movistar Team
- MTN–Qhubeka
- NetApp–Endura
- Omega Pharma–Quick-Step
- Orica–GreenEDGE
- Team Sky
- Tinkoff–Saxo
- Trek Factory Racing
- UnitedHealthcare
- Neri Sottoli

== Race overview ==
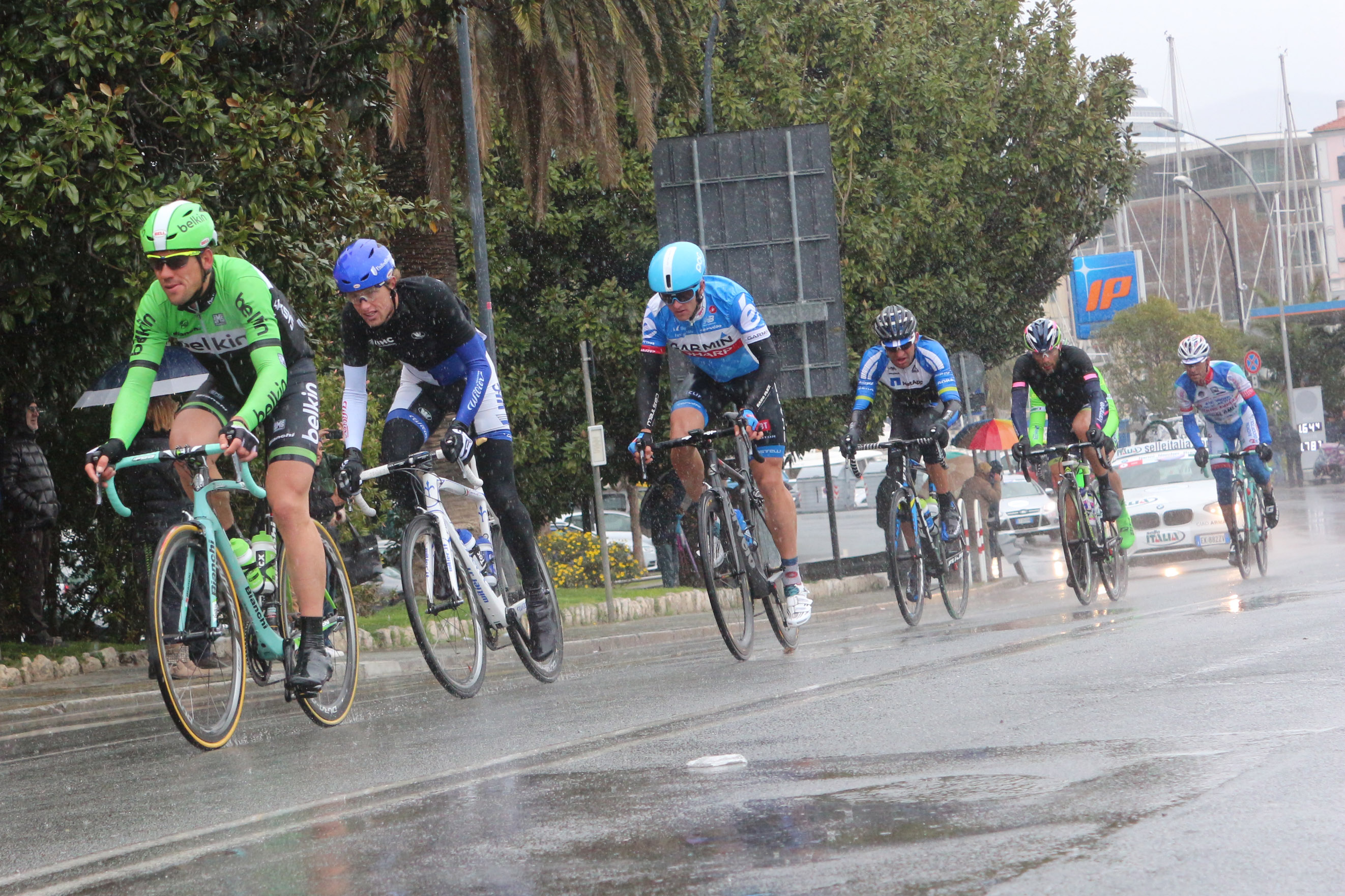
The break of seven in Savona

The 2014 Milan San Remo was won by a powerful sprint from Alexander Kristoff of Team Katusha who started his sprint with about 150m to go and surged clear of a fading Mark Cavendish. Fabian Cancellara of Trek Factory Racing finished 2nd for a 3rd time in this race and on the podium for a 5th time in seven years.

Ben Swift of Team Sky took a surprise 3rd place, ahead of Juan José Lobato (Movistar Team) and Mark Cavendish (Omega Pharma–Quick-Step). Two of the pre-race favourites missed out towards the finish, with John Degenkolb puncturing as they hit the Poggio and André Greipel suffering from cramps after chasing to get back in the winning move on the descent of the Poggio.

The race was run in harsh conditions with hail and heavy, freezing rain hammering the riders for hours. An early break of seven built up a considerable lead but they were reeled in as they hit the Cipressa and Vincenzo Nibali (Astana) went on a surprise attack. He built up a lead of around 35 seconds from the peloton but was reeled in as the race exploded in to life on the Poggio, led by Katusha and Cannondale.

In the end it was a reduced group of some 27 riders that came to the finish and Kristoff was given a lead-out by his team-mate Luca Paolini and proved the strongest at the end of a really hard day in the saddle.

Kristoff may have been seen as an outsider and was odds of 80/1 in February before the route change reverted to favouring the sprinters. He was fancied by some though following his strong showing in the Tour of Oman and because of his liking for long, hard days in the saddle. He was 33/1 to win with the bookmakers on the day.

== Results ==
	Cyclist	Team	Time
1	Alexander Kristoff (NOR)	Team Katusha	6h 55' 56"
2	Fabian Cancellara (SUI)	Trek Factory Racing	s.t.
3	Ben Swift (GBR)	Team Sky	s.t.
4	Juan José Lobato (ESP)	Movistar Team	s.t.
5	Mark Cavendish (GBR)	Omega Pharma–Quick-Step	s.t.
6	Sonny Colbrelli (ITA)	Bardiani–CSF	s.t.
7	Zdeněk Štybar (CZE)	Omega Pharma–Quick-Step	s.t.
8	Sacha Modolo (ITA)	Lampre–Merida	s.t.
9	Gerald Ciolek (GER)	MTN–Qhubeka	s.t.
10	Peter Sagan (SVK)	Cannondale	s.t.
