= 2024 Milan–San Remo =

Italian one-day cycling race

2024 UCI World Tour, race 8 of 35
- Official event poster

Race details
- Dates: 16 March 2024
- Stages: 1
- Distance: 288 km (179 mi)
- Winning time: 6h 14' 44"

Results
	Winner	Jasper Philipsen (BEL)	(Alpecin–Deceuninck)
	Second	Michael Matthews (AUS)	(Team Jayco–AlUla)
	Third	Tadej Pogačar (SLO)	(UAE Team Emirates)

The 2024 Milan–San Remo was a road cycling one-day race that took place on 16 March in north-western Italy. It was the 115th edition of the Milan–San Remo cycling classic. The race was won by Jasper Philipsen in a group sprint.

This edition of Milan–San Remo was the fastest in history, with riders averaging over 46 kilometres per hour (29 mph) throughout the race.

== Teams ==
Twenty-five teams participated in the race.

UCI WorldTeams

- Alpecin–Deceuninck
- Arkéa–B&B Hotels
- Astana Qazaqstan Team
- Bora–Hansgrohe
- Cofidis
- Decathlon–AG2R La Mondiale
- EF Education–EasyPost
- Groupama–FDJ
- INEOS Grenadiers
- Intermarché–Wanty
- Lidl–Trek
- Movistar Team
- Soudal–Quick-Step
- Team Bahrain Victorious
- Team dsm–firmenich PostNL
- Team Jayco–AlUla
- UAE Team Emirates
- Visma–Lease a Bike

UCI ProTeams

- Israel–Premier Tech
- Lotto–Dstny
- Polti–Kometa
- Team Corratec–Vini Fantini
- Tudor Pro Cycling Team
- Uno-X Mobility
- VF Group–Bardiani–CSF–Faizanè

== Summary ==
The 115th edition of Milan–San Remo in 2024 saw a slight change in its starting point, now beginning from Pavia, just outside Milan. However, the renowned route leading to San Remo remained largely intact, featuring iconic landmarks such as the Passo del Turchino, the three Capi, the Cipressa, and the pivotal Poggio.

The race commenced at 10 a.m. local time, and within the first 20 kilometres of the 288-kilometre (179-mile) route, the breakaway of the day was established. This breakaway, comprising 11 riders, was initiated by aggressive riding from Italian wildcard squads including Polti–Kometa, VF Group–Bardiani–CSF–Faizanè, and Team Corratec–Vini Fantini. Leading the charge were notable names like Alessandro Tonelli and Samuele Zoccarato of VF Group–Bardiani–CSF–Faizanè. Teams like Lidl–Trek and Alpecin–Deceuninck took control at the front of the peloton, keeping the break's advantage in check, never allowing it to exceed 1 minute 30 seconds.

As the race progressed towards the 200-kilometre (120-mile) mark, the pace slightly eased off, with the maximum gap reaching nearly 3 minutes. Despite minor incidents like bike changes and a crash involving Carlos Canal and Yuhi Todome, the road to the Passo del Turchino passed without significant drama.

By the time the break reached the halfway point of the race, their lead over the peloton was just over two minutes. Despite efforts from the chasing teams, including Lidl–Trek and Alpecin–Deceuninck, the break's advantage held steady. Approaching the Capi climbs of the Mele, Cervo, and Berta, the peloton saw a reshuffle with new teams moving up. UAE Team Emirates made their presence felt on the climbs, particularly with Tadej Pogačar pushing the pace uphill. Despite losing some members, the break managed to maintain a lead of around 1 minute 30 seconds over the peloton. However, the pace intensified as they approached the Cipressa climb, with notable favorites positioning themselves at the front.

The race saw further attacks and reshuffles on the Poggio climb, with Pogačar making a decisive move 6.5 kilometres (4.0 mi) from the finish. A thrilling descent into San Remo ensued, with attacks from Matej Mohorič, Matteo Sobrero, and Tom Pidcock in the last 2 kilometres (1.2 mi). Ultimately, the race culminated in a sprint finish where Jasper Philipsen emerged victorious, securing a win for Alpecin–Deceuninck. Behind Philipsen, Michael Matthews claimed second place, followed closely by Pogačar in third.

== Result ==
Result (1–10)
Rank	Rider	Team	Time
1	Jasper Philipsen (BEL)	Alpecin–Deceuninck	6h 14' 44"
2	Michael Matthews (AUS)	Team Jayco–AlUla	+ 0"
3	Tadej Pogačar (SLO)	UAE Team Emirates	+ 0"
4	Mads Pedersen (DEN)	Lidl–Trek	+ 0"
5	Alberto Bettiol (ITA)	EF Education–EasyPost	+ 0"
6	Matej Mohorič (SLO)	Team Bahrain Victorious	+ 0"
7	Maxim Van Gils (BEL)	Lotto–Dstny	+ 0"
8	Jasper Stuyven (BEL)	Lidl–Trek	+ 0"
9	Julian Alaphilippe (FRA)	Soudal–Quick-Step	+ 0"
10	Mathieu van der Poel (NED)	Alpecin–Deceuninck	+ 0"
