= 2026 Milan–San Remo =

Italian one-day cycling race

2026 UCI World Tour, race 8 of 35
- Official event poster

Race details
- Dates: 21 March 2026
- Stages: 1
- Distance: 298 km (185 mi)
- Winning time: 6h 35' 49"

Results
	Winner	Tadej Pogačar (SLO)	(UAE Team Emirates XRG)
	Second	Tom Pidcock (GBR)	(Pinarello–Q36.5 Pro Cycling Team)
	Third	Wout van Aert (BEL)	(Visma–Lease a Bike)

The 2026 Milan–San Remo was a road cycling one-day race that took place on 21 March in north-western Italy. It was the 117th edition of the Milan–San Remo cycling classic.

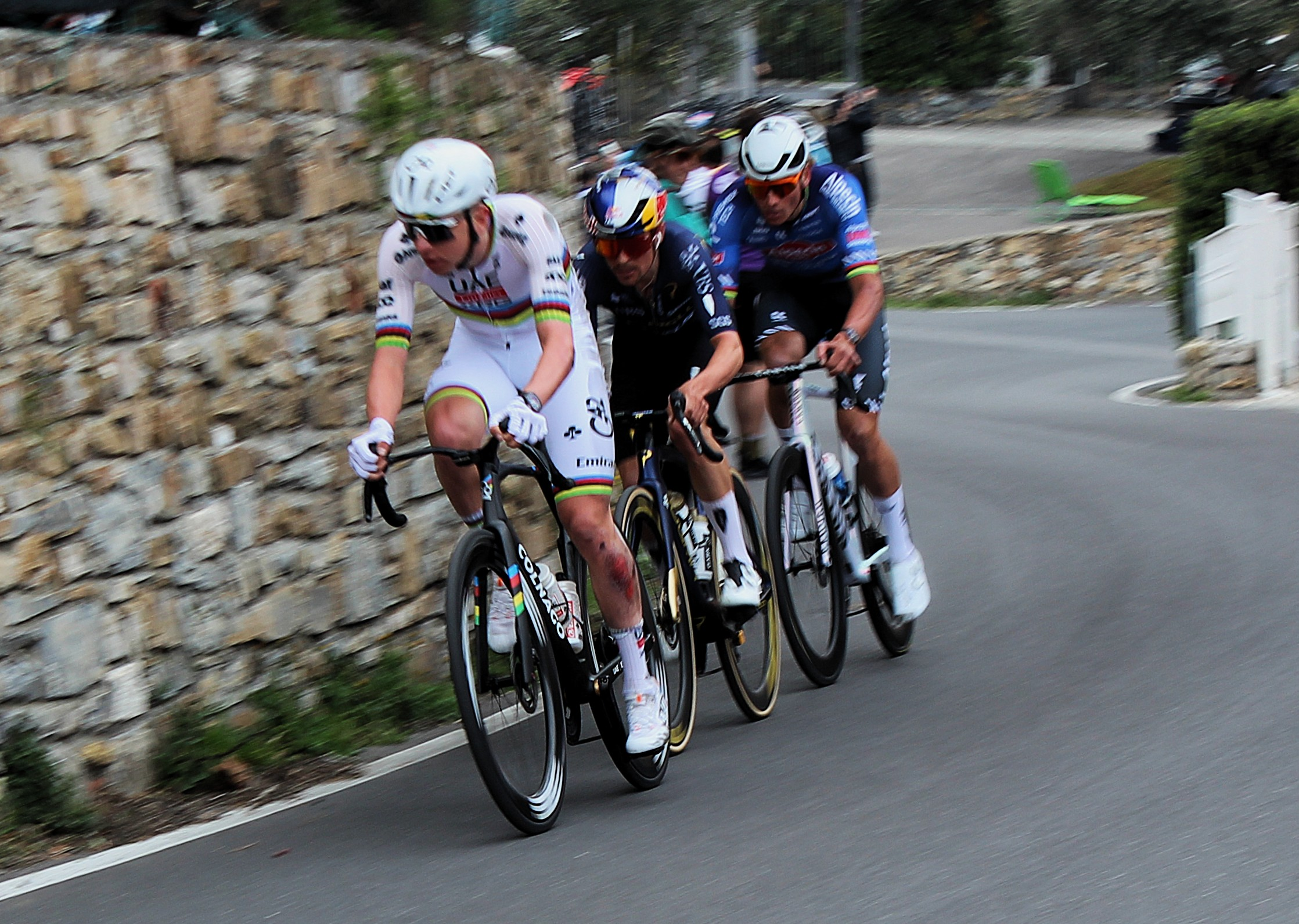
Tadej Pogačar, Tom Pidcock and Mathieu van der Poel on the Cipressa climb

The race was won by Tadej Pogačar of UAE Team Emirates XRG in a sprint finish against of Tom Pidcock of Pinarello–Q36.5 Pro Cycling Team, after Pogačar attacked on the Cipressa climb for the second year in succession. Third place went to Wout van Aert of Visma–Lease a Bike, the best of the chasing peloton behind.

Pogačar's win was his fourth different Monument victory and was his first victory in the race after four consecutive top-five finishes. The victory marked Pogačar's eleventh in a Monument, tying Roger De Vlaeminck's tally for the second-most Monument wins.

== Teams ==
All eighteen UCI WorldTeams and seven UCI ProTeams participated in the race.

UCI WorldTeams

- Alpecin–Premier Tech
- Decathlon CMA CGM
- EF Education–EasyPost
- Groupama–FDJ United
- INEOS Grenadiers
- Lidl–Trek
- Lotto–Intermarché
- Movistar Team
- NSN Cycling Team
- Red Bull–Bora–Hansgrohe
- Soudal–Quick-Step
- Team Bahrain Victorious
- Team Jayco–AlUla
- Team Picnic–PostNL
- Visma–Lease a Bike
- UAE Team Emirates XRG
- Uno-X Mobility
- XDS Astana Team

UCI ProTeams

- Bardiani–CSF 7 Saber
- Cofidis
- Pinarello–Q36.5 Pro Cycling Team
- Team Novo Nordisk
- Team Polti VisitMalta
- Tudor Pro Cycling Team
- Unibet Rose Rockets

== Race ==
The route of the 117th edition of Milan–San Remo was similar to recent years edition, with a start in Pavia, just outside Milan. The route leading to San Remo remained largely intact, featuring iconic landmarks such as the Passo del Turchino, the three Capi, the Cipressa, and the pivotal Poggio. The overall race distance was 298 kilometres (185 mi).

Like most recent editions, the race came to life on the lead-up to the penultimate climb of Cipressa. With 32.5 km (20.2 mi) left, a crash brought down several riders, including Tadej Pogačar (UAE Team Emirates XRG) and Wout van Aert (Visma–Lease a Bike) while the reigning winner, Mathieu van der Poel (Alpecin–Premier Tech), was also involved. Pogačar made it back to the peloton at the foot of the Cipressa before being brought to the front by his teammate Brandon McNulty, who began to set a furious pace.

Following a leadout by teammate Isaac Del Toro, Pogačar made his move with 24 km (15 mi) to go and 2.5 km (1.6 mi) from the top of the Cipressa, bringing Tom Pidcock (Pinarello–Q36.5 Pro Cycling Team) and van der Poel with him. The trio worked together to keep the peloton at bay before reaching the foot of the Poggio with an advantage of 10 seconds. On the climb, Pogačar successfully dropped van der Poel with his first attack. He attacked a few more times to shake off Pidcock but to no avail, with the duo reaching the top of the Poggio with a lead of around 20 seconds.

On the Via Roma, Pogačar started his sprint with 200 m (660 ft) left, managing to hold off Pidcock by half a wheel to win the race. Just four seconds behind them, van Aert, who attacked the peloton at the bottom of the Poggio descent, barely held off the peloton to take third place.

Interviewed after the race, Pogačar stated that he thought the crash meant that his chance of victory "was all over". Pogačar complimented Pidcock, stating he is "punchy [and] a really fast guy", noting that he was "a bit afraid when [Pidcock] let me go first" in the final sprint. Pidcock stated that "winning by such close margins, [but] also losing by such close margins, is what makes the times when you win better".

Following the race, UAE Team Emirates XRG mechanics revealed that Pogačar had won the race on a bike with a cracked frame and a rubbing brake, following his crash earlier in the race.

== Result ==
Result (1–10)
Rank	Rider	Team	Time
1	Tadej Pogačar (SLO)	UAE Team Emirates XRG	6h 35' 49"
2	Tom Pidcock (GBR)	Pinarello–Q36.5 Pro Cycling Team	+ 0"
3	Wout van Aert (BEL)	Visma–Lease a Bike	+ 4"
4	Mads Pedersen (DEN)	Lidl–Trek	+ 4"
5	Corbin Strong (NZL)	NSN Cycling Team	+ 4"
6	Andrea Vendrame (ITA)	Team Jayco–AlUla	+ 4"
7	Jasper Stuyven (BEL)	Soudal–Quick-Step	+ 4"
8	Mathieu van der Poel (NED)	Alpecin–Premier Tech	+ 4"
9	Matteo Trentin (ITA)	Tudor Pro Cycling Team	+ 4"
10	Edoardo Zambanini (ITA)	Team Bahrain Victorious	+ 4"
