= 2017 Milan–San Remo =

Cycling race

2017 UCI World Tour, race 8 of 37
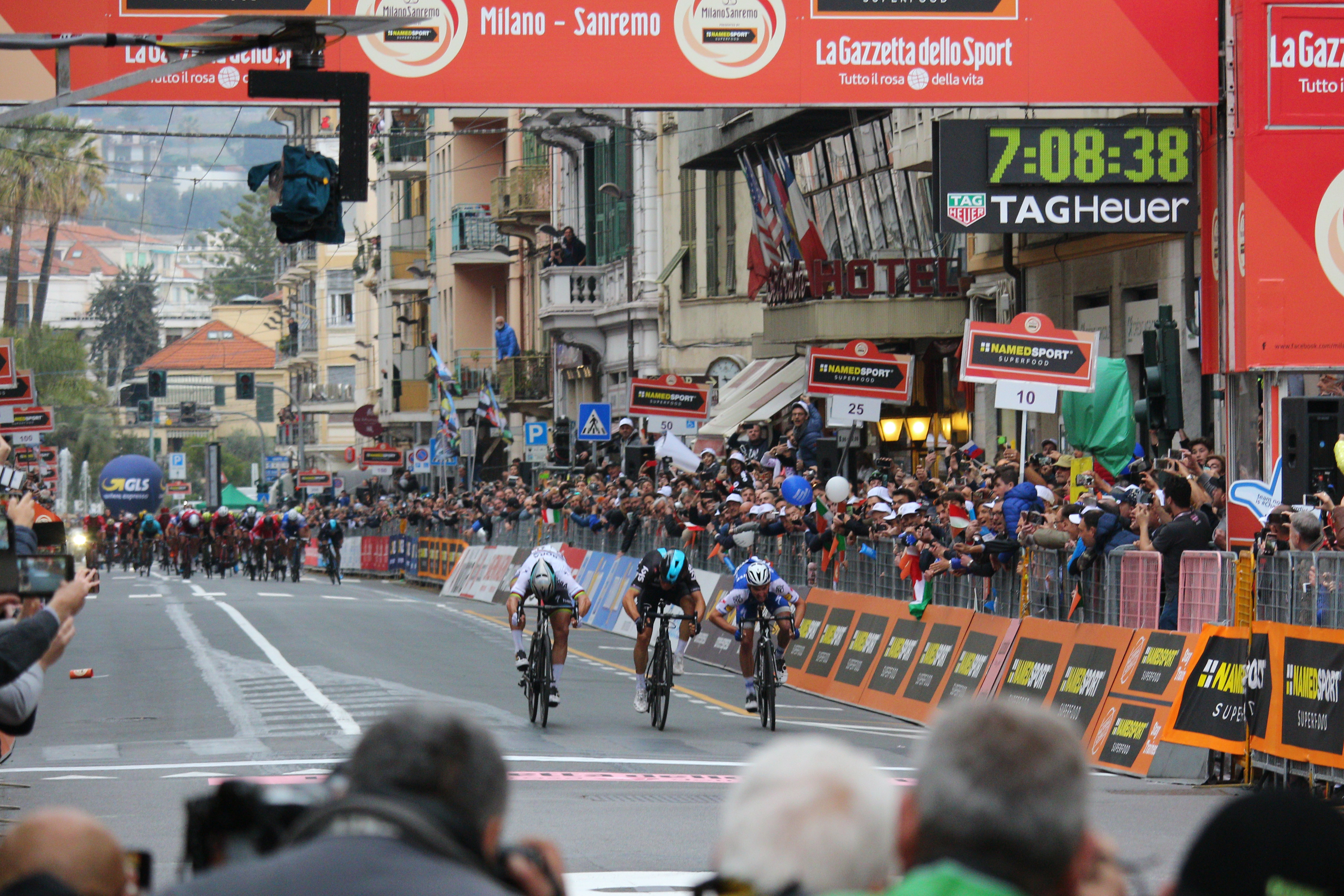
- The sprint in Sanremo

Race details
- Dates: 18 March 2017
- Stages: 1
- Distance: 291 km (181 mi)
- Winning time: 7h 08' 39"

Results
	Winner	Michał Kwiatkowski (POL)	(Team Sky)
	Second	Peter Sagan (SVK)	(Bora–Hansgrohe)
	Third	Julian Alaphilippe (FRA)	(Quick-Step Floors)

The 2017 Milan–San Remo was a road cycling one-day race that took place on 18 March. It was the 108th edition of the Milan–San Remo, and the eighth event of the 2017 UCI World Tour.

After they broke clear on the race's final climb – the Poggio di San Remo – Team Sky's Michał Kwiatkowski won the race in a three-up sprint finish ahead of world champion Peter Sagan (Bora–Hansgrohe) and Quick-Step Floors rider Julian Alaphilippe.

== Teams ==
As Milan–San Remo was a UCI World Tour event, all eighteen UCI WorldTeams were invited automatically and obliged to enter a team in the race. Seven UCI Professional Continental teams competed, completing the 25-team peloton.

UCI WorldTeams

- AG2R La Mondiale
- Astana
- Bahrain–Merida
- BMC Racing Team
- Bora–Hansgrohe
- Cannondale–Drapac
- Team Dimension Data
- FDJ
- Team Katusha–Alpecin
- LottoNL–Jumbo
- Lotto–Soudal
- Movistar Team
- Orica–Scott
- Quick-Step Floors
- Team Sky
- Team Sunweb
- Trek–Segafredo
- UAE Team Emirates

UCI Professional Continental teams

- Bardiani–CSF
- Cofidis
- Gazprom–RusVelo
- Nippo–Vini Fantini
- Team Novo Nordisk
- Wilier Triestina–Selle Italia
- Androni–Sidermec–Bottecchia

== Route ==
As one of the sports monuments, Milan–San Remo – generally considered to be a sprinters' classic – is among the highest-rated races in professional cycling. The 2017 route was 291 km (181 mi) long, running from the Via della Chiesa Rossa in Milan to the traditional finish on Sanremo's Via Roma. The final part of the race included the climbs of the Cipressa and the Poggio di San Remo, which usually prove decisive for the race outcome. Also on the route, the riders also had to tackle the 35 km (22 mi) climb of the Passo dello Turchino, although it was not considered to be a key point in the race. After the Turchino, the route followed the Aurelia road along the coast from Genoa all the way to the finish in Sanremo. With a little over 50 km (31 mi) left to go, the first of the coastal climbs started with the Capo Mele, the Capo Cervo and the Capo Berta, before meeting the final two climbs leading to the finish.

== Result ==
Result
Rank	Rider	Team	Time
1	Michał Kwiatkowski (POL)	Team Sky	7h 08' 39"
2	Peter Sagan (SVK)	Bora–Hansgrohe	+ 0"
3	Julian Alaphilippe (FRA)	Quick-Step Floors	+ 0"
4	Alexander Kristoff (NOR)	Team Katusha–Alpecin	+ 5"
5	Fernando Gaviria (COL)	Quick-Step Floors	+ 5"
6	Arnaud Démare (FRA)	FDJ	+ 5"
7	John Degenkolb (GER)	Trek–Segafredo	+ 5"
8	Nacer Bouhanni (FRA)	Cofidis	+ 5"
9	Elia Viviani (ITA)	Team Sky	+ 5"
10	Caleb Ewan (AUS)	Orica–Scott	+ 5"
