= 2025 Milan–San Remo =

Italian one-day cycling race

2025 UCI World Tour, race 8 of 35
- Official event poster

Race details
- Dates: 22 March 2025
- Stages: 1
- Distance: 289 km (180 mi)
- Winning time: 6h 22' 53"

Results
	Winner	Mathieu van der Poel (NED)	(Alpecin–Deceuninck)
	Second	Filippo Ganna (ITA)	(INEOS Grenadiers)
	Third	Tadej Pogačar (SLO)	(UAE Team Emirates XRG)

The 2025 Milan–San Remo was a road cycling one-day race that took place on 22 March in north-western Italy. It was the 116th edition of the Milan–San Remo cycling classic.

Dutch rider Mathieu van der Poel (Alpecin–Deceuninck) won the race for the second time, beating Italian Filippo Ganna (Ineos Grenadiers) and Slovenian world champion Tadej Pogačar (UAE Team Emirates XRG) in a sprint finish. The trio escaped the peloton on the Cipressa, when van de Poel and Ganna were the only two riders who were able to stay with Pogačar when he attacked. On the Cipressa, the trio broke the climbing record by 20 seconds, previously set by Gabriele Colombo and Alexander Gontchenkov at the 1996 Milan–San Remo.

Prior to the race, a women's edition of the race was held for the first time since 2005.

== Teams ==
All eighteen UCI WorldTeams and seven UCI ProTeams made up the twenty-five teams that participated in the race.

UCI WorldTeams

- Alpecin–Deceuninck
- Arkéa–B&B Hotels
- Cofidis
- Decathlon–AG2R La Mondiale
- EF Education–EasyPost
- Groupama–FDJ
- INEOS Grenadiers
- Intermarché–Wanty
- Lidl–Trek
- Movistar Team
- Red Bull–Bora–Hansgrohe
- Soudal–Quick-Step
- Team Bahrain Victorious
- Team Picnic–PostNL
- Team Jayco–AlUla
- UAE Team Emirates XRG
- Visma–Lease a Bike
- XDS Astana Team

UCI ProTeams

- Israel–Premier Tech
- Lotto
- Q36.5 Pro Cycling Team
- Team Solution Tech–Vini Fantini
- Tudor Pro Cycling Team
- Uno-X Mobility
- VF Group–Bardiani–CSF–Faizanè

== Race ==
The route of the 116th edition of Milan–San Remo was similar to the 2024 edition, with a start in Pavia, just outside Milan. The route leading to San Remo remained largely intact, featuring iconic landmarks such as the Passo del Turchino, the three Capi, the Cipressa, and the pivotal Poggio. The overall race distance was 289 kilometres (180 mi).

The race began under rainy skies and saw the early breakaway formed of eight riders, including Filippo Turconi (VF Group–Bardiani–CSF–Faizanè) who was the youngest rider in the race at 19 years old. Turconi had support from four other Italian riders, two from France and one British rider. They were rarely allowed a gap of more than five minutes. As the peloton increased their speed, Laurence Pithie (Red Bull–Bora–Hansgrohe) was involved in a crash with four other riders just before the final 50 km. By the time the breakaway made it to the foot of the Cipressa, just three riders remained, with Martin Marcellusi (VF Group–Bardiani–CSF–Faizanè) being the last rider to be caught as UAE Team Emirates XRG teammates Tim Wellens and Jhonatan Narváez starting pulling on the front, despite a small crash at the beginning on the climb leaving them with just three riders at the front.

On the Cipressa, race favourite Tadej Pogačar (UAE Team Emirates XRG) attacked with 25 km remaining, with just Mathieu van der Poel (Alpecin–Deceuninck), Filippo Ganna (Ineos Grenadiers) and Romain Grégoire (Groupama–FDJ) able to keep on his wheel. After a second attack from Pogačar, Gregoire was dropped leaving three riders in front. The attacks and pace meant that the trio broke the record for the fastest climb of the Cipressa by 20 seconds – previously set by Gabriele Colombo and Alexander Gontchenkov at the 1996 Milan–San Remo. Pogačar continued to attack on the Poggio climb but could not distance van der Poel, while Ganna rode his own tempo up the climb, managing to catch the two riders in front inside the final kilometre. Van der Poel launched the sprint inside the final 300m to claim victory. It was his second win in the race having won the 2023 edition. By the finish line, the peloton was reduced to 37 riders, with Michael Matthews (Team Jayco–AlUla) winning the sprint to claim fourth spot.

Following the race, media praised the excitement of the battle between Pogačar, van der Poel and Ganna – with L'Équipe calling the race "one of the most memorable 'Primaveras'", and Cycling Weekly stating the race had been "an epic duel". Pogačar expressed his disappointment not to win, stating "I don't hate Milan-San Remo but one year it needs to go right".

== Result ==
Result (1–10)
Rank	Rider	Team	Time
1	Mathieu van der Poel (NED)	Alpecin–Deceuninck	6h 22' 53"
2	Filippo Ganna (ITA)	INEOS Grenadiers	+ 0"
3	Tadej Pogačar (SLO)	UAE Team Emirates XRG	+ 0"
4	Michael Matthews (AUS)	Team Jayco–AlUla	+ 43"
5	Kaden Groves (AUS)	Alpecin–Deceuninck	+ 43"
6	Magnus Cort (DEN)	Uno-X Mobility	+ 43"
7	Mads Pedersen (DEN)	Lidl–Trek	+ 43"
8	Olav Kooij (NED)	Visma–Lease a Bike	+ 43"
9	Matteo Trentin (ITA)	Tudor Pro Cycling Team	+ 43"
10	Fred Wright (GBR)	Team Bahrain Victorious	+ 43"
