= Angelo Varetto =

Italian cyclist

Personal information
- Full name: Angelo Varetto
- Born: October 10, 1910 Turin
- Died: October 8, 2001 (aged 90) Milan

Cycling career
- Sport: Cycling
- Discipline: Road
- Role: Rider

Professional teams
- 1934: SC Nazzaro Torino
- 1935: individual
- 1936-1937: Gloria
- 1938: Gloria-Ambrosiana

Major wins
- Milan–San Remo (1936)

Angelo Varetto (10 October 1910 in Turin – 8 October 2001 in Milan) was an Italian cyclist.

He was professional from 1934 to 1938.

== Palmarès ==
1934
Asti-Ceriale

1936
Milan–San Remo
Coppa Caldirola
