= 1936 Milan–San Remo =

Race details
- Dates: 19 March 1936
- Stages: 1
- Distance: 281.5 km (174.9 mi)
- Winning time: 7h 43' 00"

Results
	Winner	Angelo Varetto (ITA)
	Second	Carlo Romanatti (ITA)
	Third	Olimpio Bizzi (ITA)

The 1936 Milan–San Remo was the 29th edition of the Milan–San Remo cycle race and was held on 19 March 1936. The race started in Milan and finished in San Remo. The race was won by Angelo Varetto.

== General classification ==
Final general classification

Rank	Rider	Time
1	Angelo Varetto (ITA)	7h 43' 00"
2	Carlo Romanatti (ITA)	+ 0"
3	Olimpio Bizzi (ITA)	+ 1' 40"
4	Giovanni Gotti (ITA)	+ 1' 40"
5	Adriano Vignoli (ITA)	+ 1' 40"
6	Giuseppe Olmo (ITA)	+ 1' 40"
7	Augusto Introzzi (ITA)	+ 1' 40"
8	Adalino Mealli (ITA)	+ 1' 40"
9	Mario Cipriani (ITA)	+ 1' 40"
10	Giotto Cinelli (ITA)	+ 5' 00"
