= Castellaro =

Castellaro Castellâ
- Comune
- Comune di Castellaro
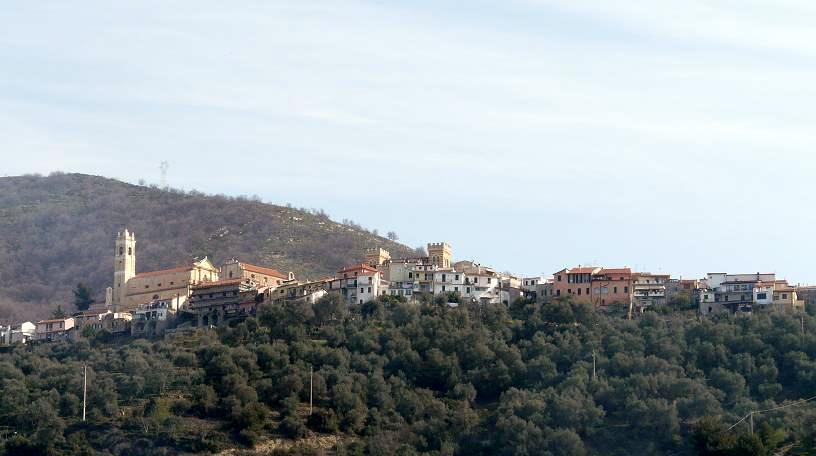
- View of Castellaro

- Location within Italy Location within Liguria
- Coordinates: 43°52′N 7°52′E
- Country: Italy
- Region: Liguria
- Province: Province of Imperia (IM)

Area
  - Total: 8.7 km^{2} (3.4 sq mi)

Population (Dec. 2004)
  - Total: 1,083
  - Density: 120/km^{2} (320/sq mi)
- Time zone: UTC+1 (CET)
  - Summer (DST): UTC+2 (CEST)
- Postal code: 18011
- Dialing code: 0184

Castellaro (Ligurian: Castellâ) is a comune (municipality) in the Province of Imperia in the Italian region Liguria, located about 100 kilometres (62 mi) southwest of Genoa and about 14 kilometres (9 mi) west of Imperia. As of 31 December 2004, it had a population of 1,083 and an area of 8.7 square kilometres (3.4 mi^{2}).

Castellaro borders the following municipalities: Pietrabruna, Pompeiana, Riva Ligure, and Taggia.

== Demographic evolution ==
Historical population

Year	Pop.	±%
1861	1,085	—
1871	1,048	−3.4%
1881	848	−19.1%
1901	686	−19.1%
1911	682	−0.6%

Year	Pop.	±%
1921	642	−5.9%
1931	587	−8.6%
1936	512	−12.8%
1951	520	+1.6%
1961	545	+4.8%

Year	Pop.	±%
1971	649	+19.1%
1981	632	−2.6%
1991	860	+36.1%
2001	1,044	+21.4%

Source: Data from ISTAT
