= Civezza =

- Comune
- Comune di Civezza
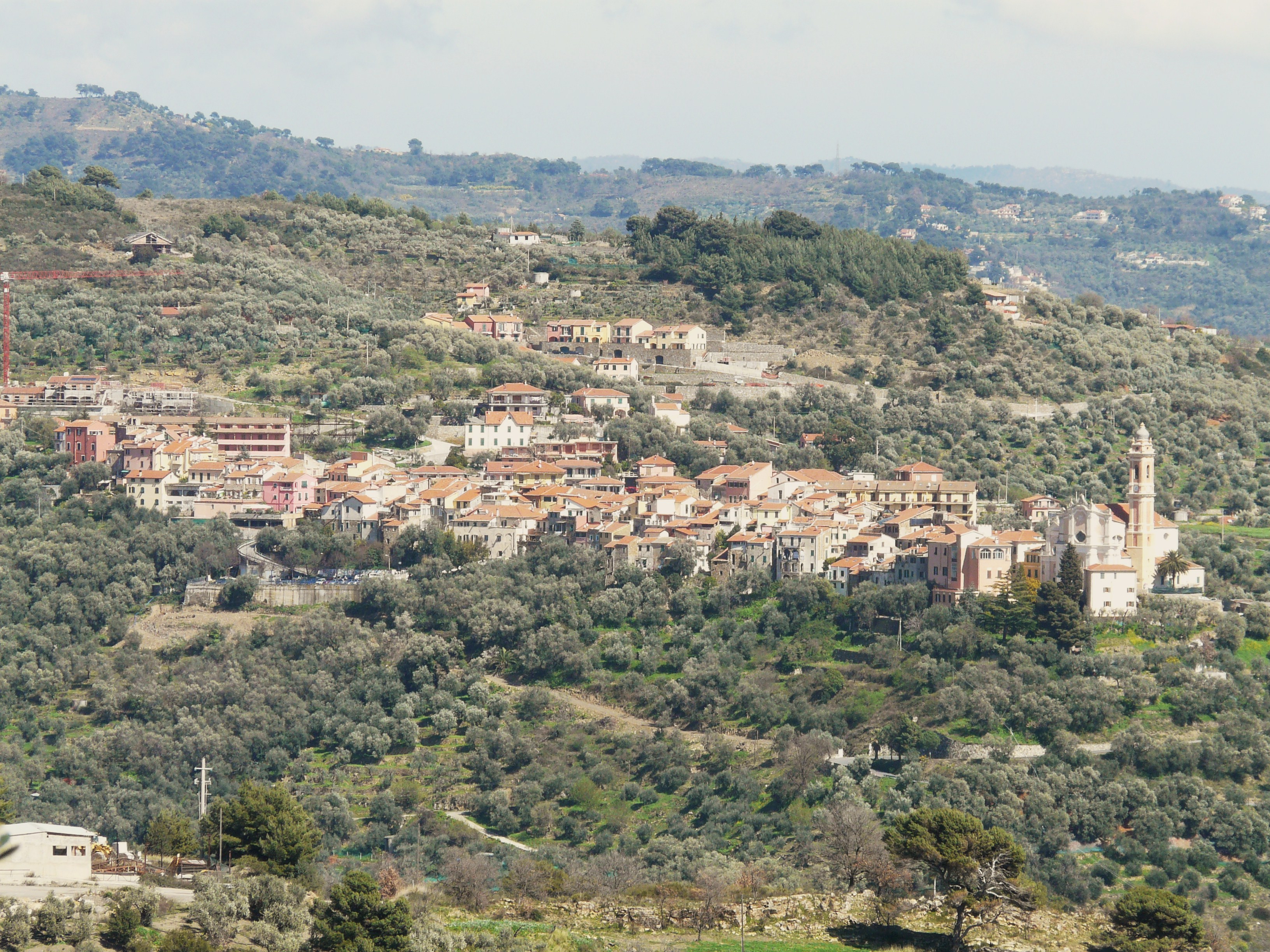
- View of Civezza

- Location within Italy Location within Liguria
- Coordinates: 43°53′N 7°57′E
- Country: Italy
- Region: Liguria
- Province: Province of Imperia (IM)

Area
  - Total: 3.8 km^{2} (1.5 sq mi)

Population (Dec. 2004)
  - Total: 557
  - Density: 150/km^{2} (380/sq mi)
- Time zone: UTC+1 (CET)
  - Summer (DST): UTC+2 (CEST)
- Postal code: 18017
- Dialing code: 0183

Civezza (çivèssa in Ligurian) is a comune (municipality) in the Province of Imperia in the Italian region Liguria, located about 127 kilometres (79 mi) southwest of Genoa and about 7 kilometres (4 mi) west of Imperia. As of 31 December 2004, it had a population of 557 and an area of 3.8 square kilometres (1.5 mi^{2}).

The village is located on the top of a hill, like many others villages of the riviera. The seaside is just 4 kilometres (2.5 mi) away.

The French border is 58 kilometres (36 mi) away, and the Principality of Monaco is 69 kilometres (43 mi). The closest big city is the French city of Nice, 83 kilometres (52 mi) west of Civezza, while the regional capital Genova is 127 kilometres (79 mi) east of the village. Civezza borders the following municipalities: Cipressa, Dolcedo, Imperia, Pietrabruna, and San Lorenzo al Mare.

The village was founded in the 11th century: a well-known legend says its birth is due to the decision of three noble families (the Riccas, the Dolcas and the Arrigos) to settle here after being exiled from Venice, because of political contrasts with the city's doge. Civezza is a medieval village, with five ancient towers built in the 16th century to defend its territory against saracens pirates.

The patron saint is Saint Mark the Evangelist, and he is celebrated on April, 25th. The name of the patron saint is also the name of Civezza's main church (San Marco Evangelista). There are also five smaller churches in Civezza: 'san Giovanni', 'san Rocco', 'san Sebastiano', 'san Salvatore' and 'Madonna delle Grazie'.

Weather is warm but windy in all seasons, and rainfalls are rare.

There is a traditional production of olive oil and wine.

Despite the small size of the village, in Civezza there are: a post office, two alimentari shops, two bars, three agritourism locations, a supermarket, a restaurant, a pharmacy, an inn. There's also a kindergarten and a primary school. At least four times per day a public bus service connects Civezza to the provincial capital Imperia and San Lorenzo al Mare.

Languages spoken are Italian and Ligurian, the last one mainly by the elderly. French is also widely understood.

== Demographic evolution ==
Historical population

Year	Pop.	±%
1861	809	—
1871	745	−7.9%
1881	723	−3.0%
1901	686	−5.1%
1911	687	+0.1%

Year	Pop.	±%
1921	630	−8.3%
1931	487	−22.7%
1936	482	−1.0%
1951	457	−5.2%
1961	400	−12.5%

Year	Pop.	±%
1971	412	+3.0%
1981	374	−9.2%
1991	462	+23.5%
2001	536	+16.0%

Source: Data from ISTAT

== See also ==
- Liguria wine
