= Terzorio =

Terzorio O Tersö
- Comune
- Comune di Terzorio
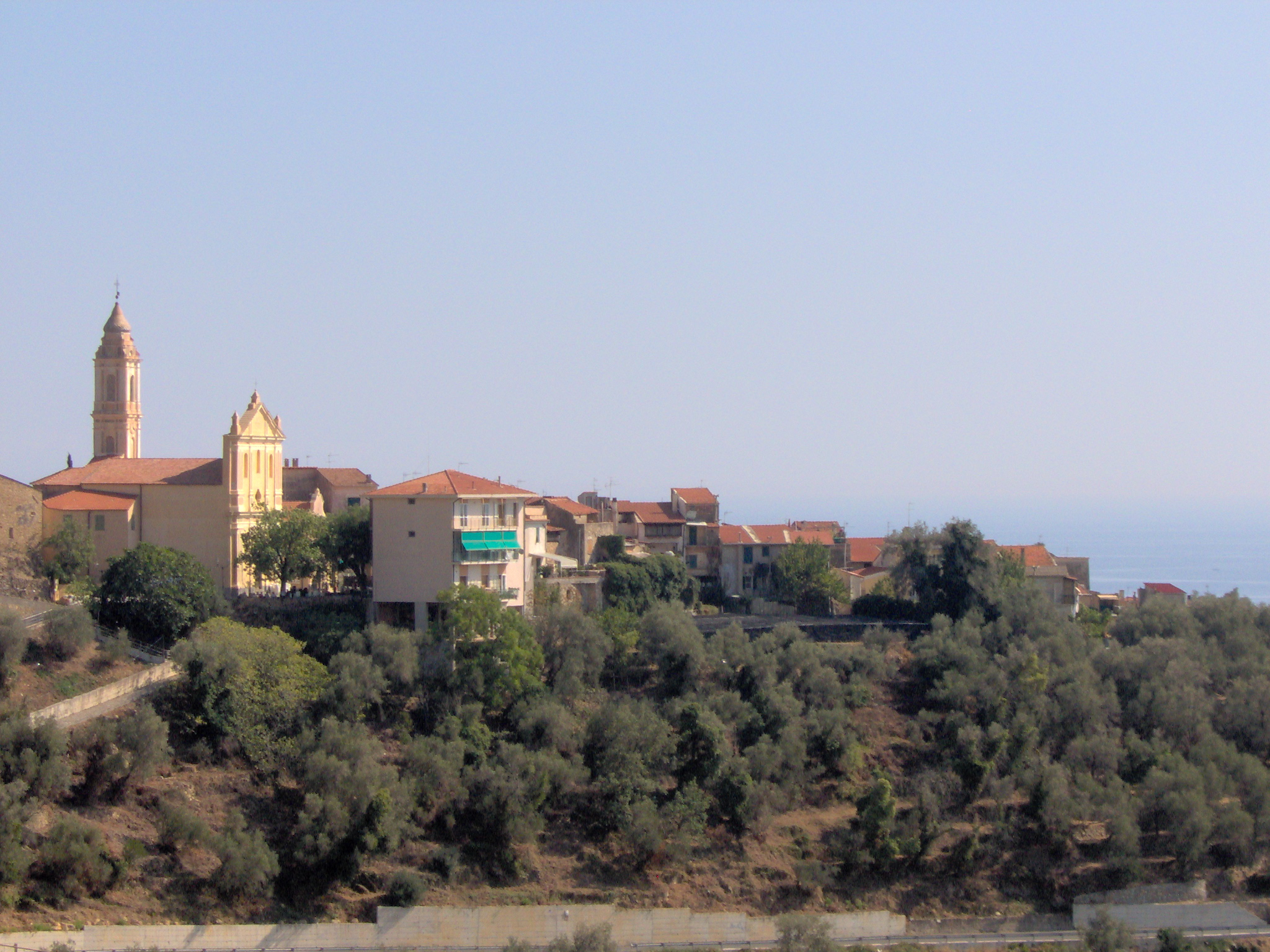
- View of Terzorio

- Location within Italy Location within Liguria
- Coordinates: 43°51′N 7°54′E
- Country: Italy
- Region: Liguria
- Province: Province of Imperia (IM)

Government
  - Mayor: Valerio Ferrari (Civic List)

Area
  - Total: 1.9 km^{2} (0.73 sq mi)
- Elevation: 185 m (607 ft)

Population (Dec. 2004)
  - Total: 208
  - Density: 110/km^{2} (280/sq mi)
- Demonym: Terzorian
- Time zone: UTC+1 (CET)
  - Summer (DST): UTC+2 (CEST)
- Postal code: 18010
- Dialing code: 0184
- ISTAT code: 008060
- Patron saint: Saint Giovanni Decollato
- Saint day: August 29
- Website: Official website

Terzorio (Ligurian: O Tersö) is a comune (municipality) in the Province of Imperia in the Italian region Liguria, located about 100 kilometres (62 mi) southwest of Genoa and about 11 kilometres (7 mi) southwest of Imperia. The municipality has an area of 1.9 square kilometres (0.73 mi^{2}).

Terzorio borders the following municipalities: Cipressa, Pompeiana, and Santo Stefano al Mare.

== Population and Demographics ==
As of 31 December 2004, Terzorio had a population of 208.

Historical population

Year	Pop.	±%
1861	338	—
1871	296	−12.4%
1881	279	−5.7%
1901	299	+7.2%
1911	266	−11.0%

Year	Pop.	±%
1921	278	+4.5%
1931	264	−5.0%
1936	269	+1.9%
1951	240	−10.8%
1961	254	+5.8%

Year	Pop.	±%
1971	272	+7.1%
1981	258	−5.1%
1991	217	−15.9%
2001	214	−1.4%

Source: Data from ISTAT
