= Pietrabruna =

- Comune
- Comune di Pietrabruna
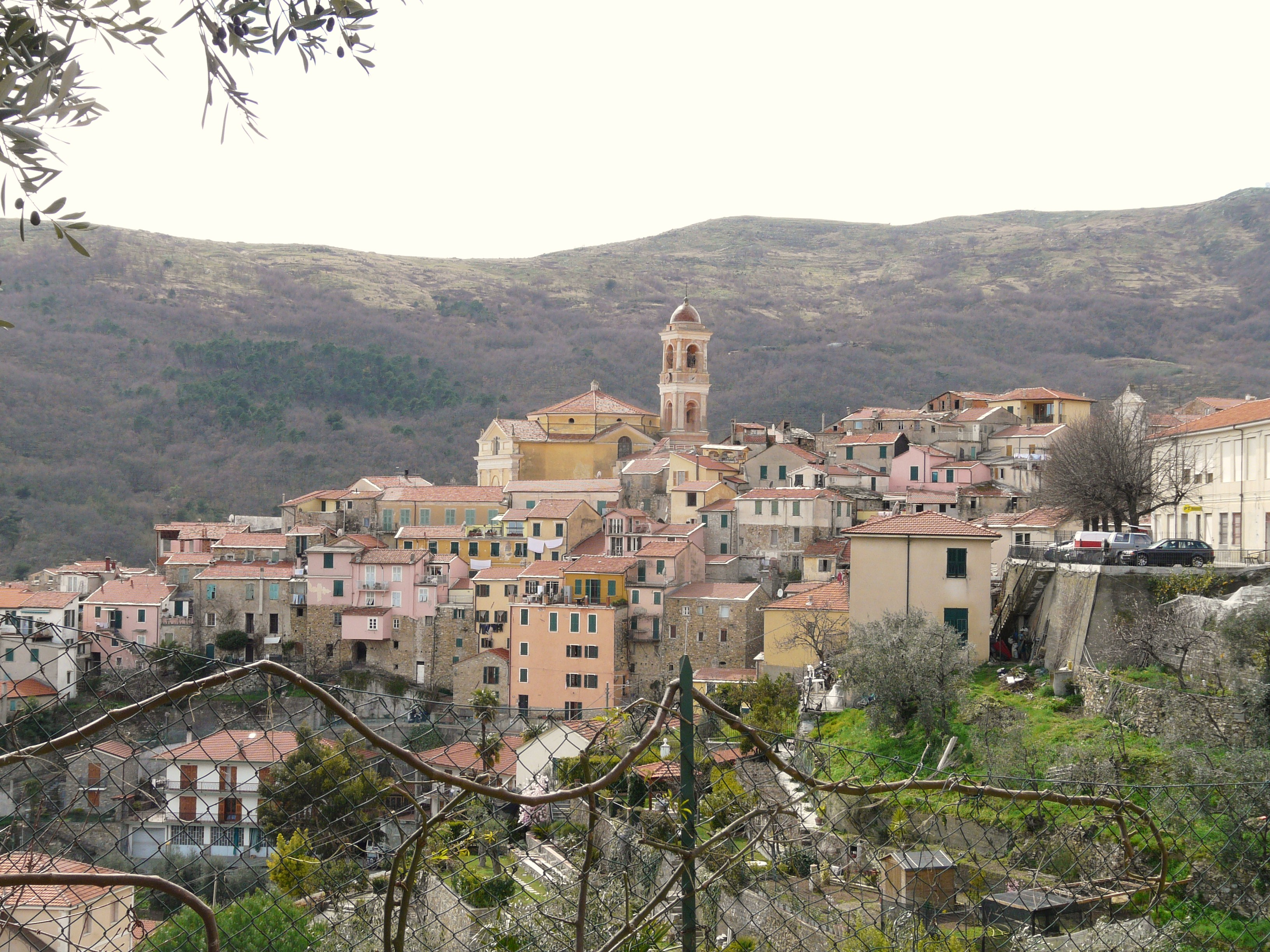
- View of Pietrabruna

- Location within Italy Location within Liguria
- Coordinates: 43°53′N 7°54′E
- Country: Italy
- Region: Liguria
- Province: Province of Imperia (IM)

Area
  - Total: 9.9 km^{2} (3.8 sq mi)

Population (Dec. 2004)
  - Total: 568
  - Density: 57/km^{2} (150/sq mi)
- Time zone: UTC+1 (CET)
  - Summer (DST): UTC+2 (CEST)
- Postal code: 18010
- Dialing code: 0

Pietrabruna (Ligurian: Priabruna or Prebuna) is a comune (municipality) in the Province of Imperia in the Italian region Liguria, located about 100 kilometres (62 mi) southwest of Genoa and about 11 kilometres (7 mi) west of Imperia. As of 31 December 2004, it had a population of 568 and an area of 9.9 square kilometres (3.8 mi^{2}).

Pietrabruna borders the following municipalities: Castellaro, Cipressa, Civezza, Dolcedo, Pompeiana, and Taggia.

== Demographic evolution ==
Historical population

Year	Pop.	±%
1861	1,307	—
1871	1,392	+6.5%
1881	1,298	−6.8%
1901	1,148	−11.6%
1911	1,162	+1.2%

Year	Pop.	±%
1921	1,095	−5.8%
1931	962	−12.1%
1936	954	−0.8%
1951	904	−5.2%
1961	804	−11.1%

Year	Pop.	±%
1971	705	−12.3%
1981	632	−10.4%
1991	577	−8.7%
2001	560	−2.9%

Source: Data from ISTAT
