= Riva Ligure =

- Comune
- Comune di Riva Ligure
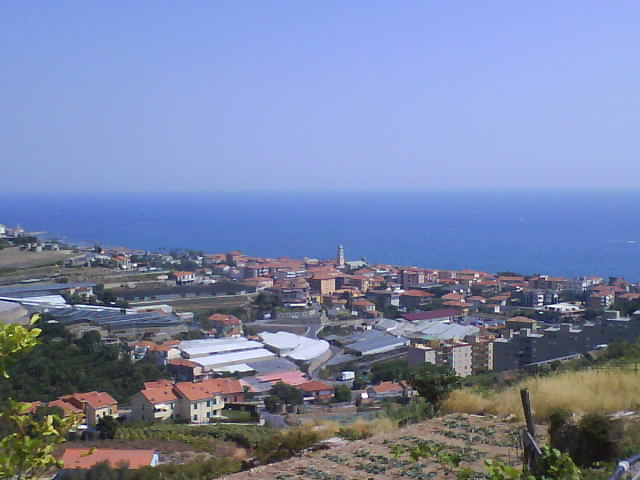
- View of Riva Ligure

- Coat of arms

- Location within Italy Location within Liguria
- Coordinates: 43°50′N 7°53′E
- Country: Italy
- Region: Liguria
- Province: Province of Imperia (IM)

Area
  - Total: 2.1 km^{2} (0.81 sq mi)

Population (Dec. 2004)
  - Total: 2,830
  - Density: 1,300/km^{2} (3,500/sq mi)
- Time zone: UTC+1 (CET)
  - Summer (DST): UTC+2 (CEST)
- Postal code: 18015
- Dialing code: 0184
- Website: Official website

Riva Ligure is a comune (municipality) in the Province of Imperia in the Italian region Liguria, located about 110 kilometres (68 mi) southwest of Genoa and about 13 kilometres (8 mi) southwest of Imperia. As of 31 December 2004, it had a population of 2,830 and an area of 2.1 square kilometres (0.81 mi^{2}).

Riva Ligure borders the following municipalities: Castellaro, Pompeiana, Santo Stefano al Mare, and Taggia.

== Demographic evolution ==
Historical population

Year	Pop.	±%
1861	747	—
1871	679	−9.1%
1881	579	−14.7%
1901	754	+30.2%
1911	857	+13.7%

Year	Pop.	±%
1921	853	−0.5%
1931	923	+8.2%
1936	1,022	+10.7%
1951	1,468	+43.6%
1961	2,197	+49.7%

Year	Pop.	±%
1971	2,828	+28.7%
1981	2,678	−5.3%
1991	3,057	+14.2%
2001	2,747	−10.1%

Source: Data from ISTAT
