= Rouleur =

Bicycle racing term

A rouleur is a type of racing cyclist who excels at long solo efforts and time trials.

== Details ==
A rouleur is a cyclist who is able to maintain a high level of power for a long period of time. They will generally be relatively poor at short, very intense efforts and will be unable to match the accelerations of pure climbers in the mountains. They excel on long efforts on relatively flat terrain, such as solo breakaways and time trials.

Examples of rouleurs include Jacques Anquetil, Tony Martin, Fabian Cancellara, Sylvain Chavanel, Jens Voigt, Kasper Asgreen, Thomas De Gendt, Alessandro De Marchi, Steve Cummings, Rohan Dennis, Tim Declercq and Alison Jackson.

The British cycling magazine Rouleur takes its name from the term.
