= Pompeiana =

Pompeiana Pumpiâna
- Comune
- Comune di Pompeiana
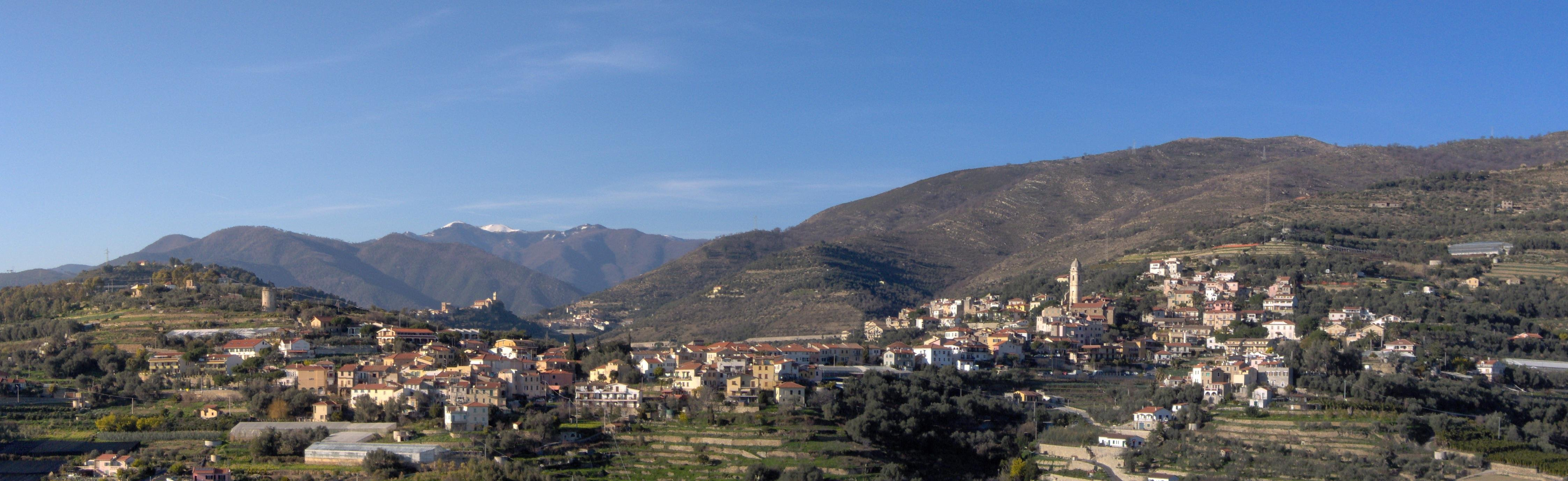
- View of Pompeiana

- Location within Italy Location within Liguria
- Coordinates: 43°51′N 7°53′E
- Country: Italy
- Region: Liguria
- Province: Province of Imperia (IM)

Area
  - Total: 5.4 km^{2} (2.1 sq mi)
- Elevation: 200 m (660 ft)

Population (Dec. 2004)
  - Total: 859
  - Density: 160/km^{2} (410/sq mi)
- Demonym: Pompeianesi
- Time zone: UTC+1 (CET)
  - Summer (DST): UTC+2 (CEST)
- Postal code: 18015
- Dialing code: 0184

Pompeiana (Ligurian: Pumpiâna) is a comune (municipality) in the Province of Imperia in the Italian region Liguria, situated about 110 kilometres (68 mi) southwest of Genoa and about 13 kilometres (8 mi) southwest of Imperia. As of 31 December 2004, it had a population of 859 and an area of 5.4 square kilometres (2.1 mi^{2}).

Pompeiana borders the following municipalities: Castellaro, Cipressa, Pietrabruna, Riva Ligure, Santo Stefano al Mare, and Terzorio.

== Demographic evolution ==
Historical population

Year	Pop.	±%
1861	1,013	—
1871	966	−4.6%
1881	907	−6.1%
1901	751	−17.2%
1911	680	−9.5%

Year	Pop.	±%
1921	695	+2.2%
1931	561	−19.3%
1936	585	+4.3%
1951	528	−9.7%
1961	654	+23.9%

Year	Pop.	±%
1971	604	−7.6%
1981	614	+1.7%
1991	729	+18.7%
2001	831	+14.0%

Source: Data from ISTAT
