= Taggia =

- Comune
- Comune di Taggia
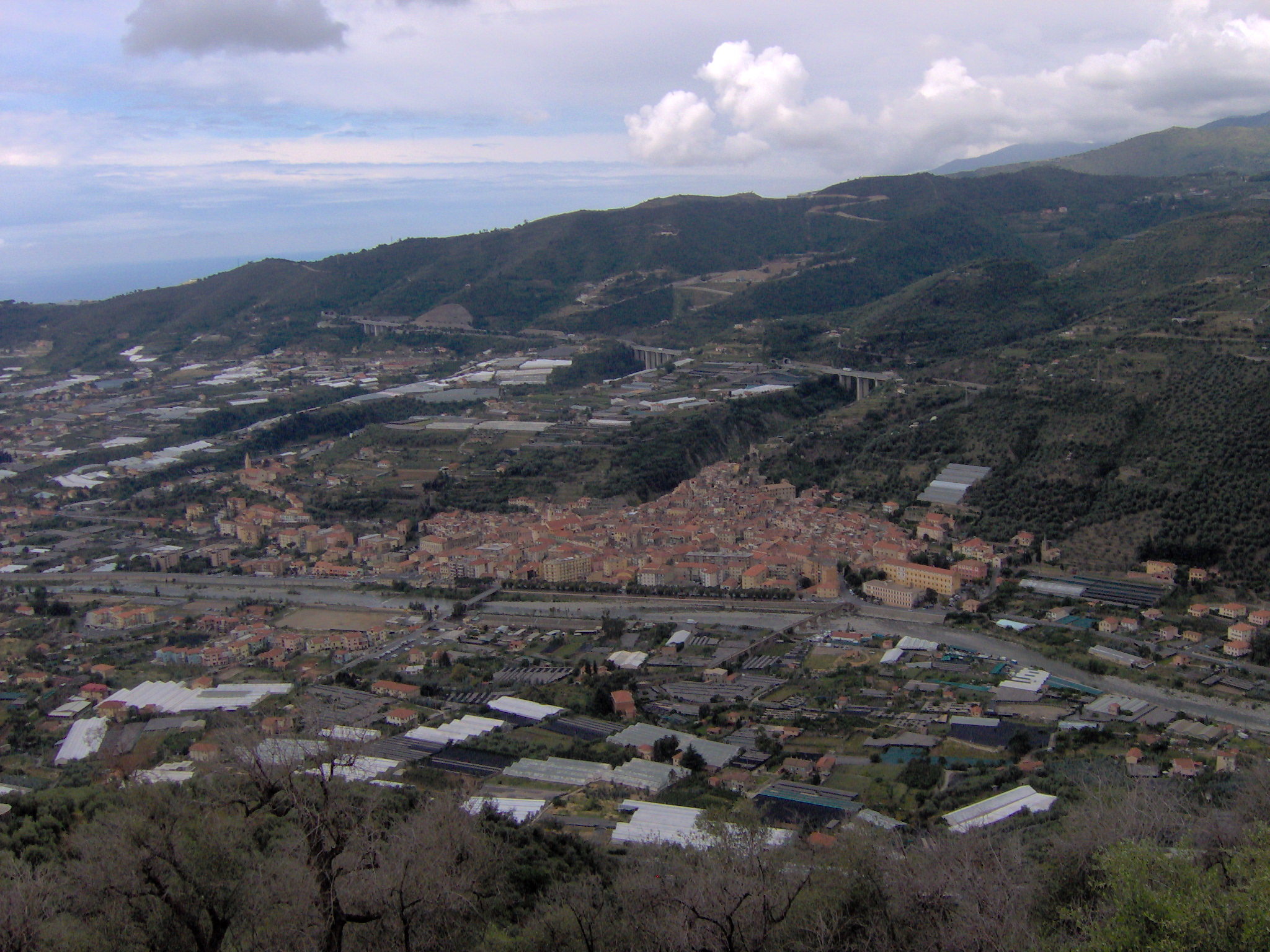
- View of Taggia

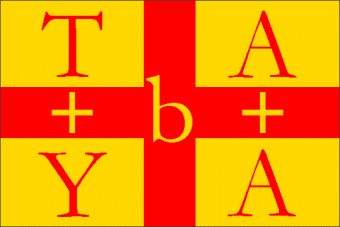
- Flag Coat of arms

- Location within Italy Location within Liguria
- Coordinates: 43°52′N 7°51′E
- Country: Italy
- Region: Liguria
- Province: Imperia (IM)
- Frazioni: Arma di Taggia, Borghi, Levà

Government
  - Mayor: Mario Conio

Area
  - Total: 30.87 km^{2} (11.92 sq mi)
- Elevation: 39 m (128 ft)

Population (28 February 2017)
  - Total: 14,040
  - Density: 454.8/km^{2} (1,178/sq mi)
- Demonym: Taggiaschi or Tabiesi
- Time zone: UTC+1 (CET)
  - Summer (DST): UTC+2 (CEST)
- Postal code: 18018
- Dialing code: 0184
- Patron saint: Madonna of the Miracles and St. Benedict Revelli
- Saint day: Second Saturday in February
- Website: Official website

Taggia is a comune (municipality) in the Province of Imperia in the Italian region Liguria, located about 110 kilometres (68 miles) southwest of Genoa and about 15 km (9 mi) west of Imperia. It has around 13,000 inhabitants.

Taggia borders the following municipalities: Badalucco, Castellaro, Ceriana, Dolcedo, Pietrabruna, Riva Ligure, and Sanremo. It is one of I Borghi più belli d'Italia ("The most beautiful villages of Italy").

== Geography ==
The town is divided into three parts: Taggia proper, located in the Valle Argentina in the immediate outback, it can be considered the proper centre of the city; Arma, a sea resort; and Levà, including the industrial area, placed between the other centres. The town can be found at approximately ten miles (16 km) from the city of Imperia.

== History ==
Tombs dating from the 10th-7th centuries BC have been found in the area of Taggia. During the Roman domination it was an important commercial port, known as Costa Balenae. After the fall of the Western Roman Empire, the old centre was damaged by the invasion of Rotharis's Lombards and then by a landslide in 690. The inhabitants moved to a new walled settlement, called Tabia. Despite its defences, in 889 it was sacked and razed to the ground by the Saracens.

The rebuilt burgh became in 1153 a fief of the Clavesana family, but soon later it was acquired by the Republic of Genoa. In 1273 it became an autonomous commune, later receiving a podestà named in Genoa, under which it remained until its disappearing in the Napoleonic Wars. Later it was part of the Kingdom of Sardinia (1815) and of the Kingdom of Italy (1861).

== Main sights ==
- Basilica of San Giacomo and San Filippo (1675–1681), built on an 11th-century Romanesque church.
- Church of Santa Maria del Canneto (10th or 14th century).
- Church of San Martino di Tours, housing 15th-century frescoes.
- Convent of San Domenico (160–1490). It has some pictures painted by Ludovico Brea.
- Palazzo Asdente (1473).
- Palazzo Curlo (1448).
- Palazzo Vivaldi (1458).

== Transport ==
Taggia is situated on the Strada statale 1 Via Aurelia (now a provincial road). It has also a gate on the A10 Highway.

Taggia has a railway station on the Genoa–Ventimiglia line.

Riviera di Trasporti SpA provides public transport service. Taggia was served by trolleybuses of the Sanremo trolleybus system from 1948 to 2002 and before 1948 by an interurban tramway from Sanremo.
