= San Lorenzo al Mare =

- Comune
- Comune di San Lorenzo al Mare
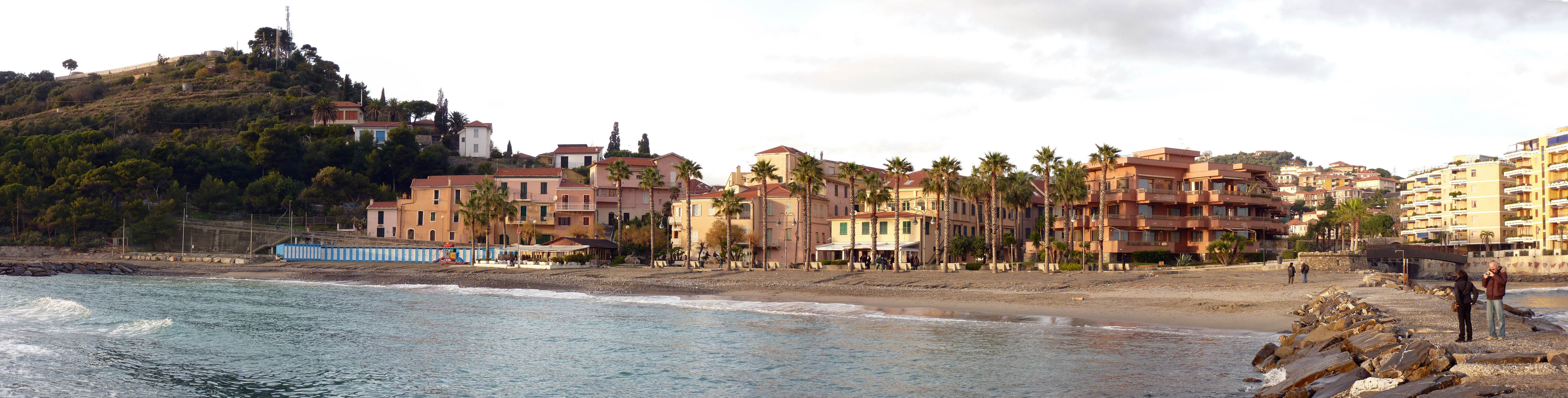
- View of San Lorenzo al Mare

- Coat of arms

- Location within Italy Location within Liguria
- Coordinates: 43°52′N 7°55′E
- Country: Italy
- Region: Liguria
- Province: Province of Imperia (IM)

Area
  - Total: 1.3 km^{2} (0.50 sq mi)

Population (Dec. 2004)
  - Total: 1,409
  - Density: 1,100/km^{2} (2,800/sq mi)
- Time zone: UTC+1 (CET)
  - Summer (DST): UTC+2 (CEST)
- Postal code: 18017
- Dialing code: 0183

San Lorenzo al Mare (Ligurian: San Loénso) is a comune (municipality) in the Province of Imperia in the Italian region Liguria, located about 100 kilometres (62 miles) southwest of Genoa and about 10 km (6 mi) west of Imperia. As of 31 December 2004, it had a population of 1,409 and an area of 1.3 square kilometres (0.5 sq mi).

San Lorenzo al Mare borders the following municipalities: Cipressa, Civezza, Costarainera, and Imperia.

== Demographic evolution ==
Historical population

Year	Pop.	±%
1861	262	—
1871	255	−2.7%
1881	231	−9.4%
1901	267	+15.6%
1911	240	−10.1%

Year	Pop.	±%
1921	243	+1.2%
1931	407	+67.5%
1936	570	+40.0%
1951	659	+15.6%
1961	979	+48.6%

Year	Pop.	±%
1971	1,225	+25.1%
1981	1,397	+14.0%
1991	1,378	−1.4%
2001	1,402	+1.7%

Source: Data from ISTAT
