= Santo Stefano al Mare =

- Comune
- Comune di Santo Stefano al Mare
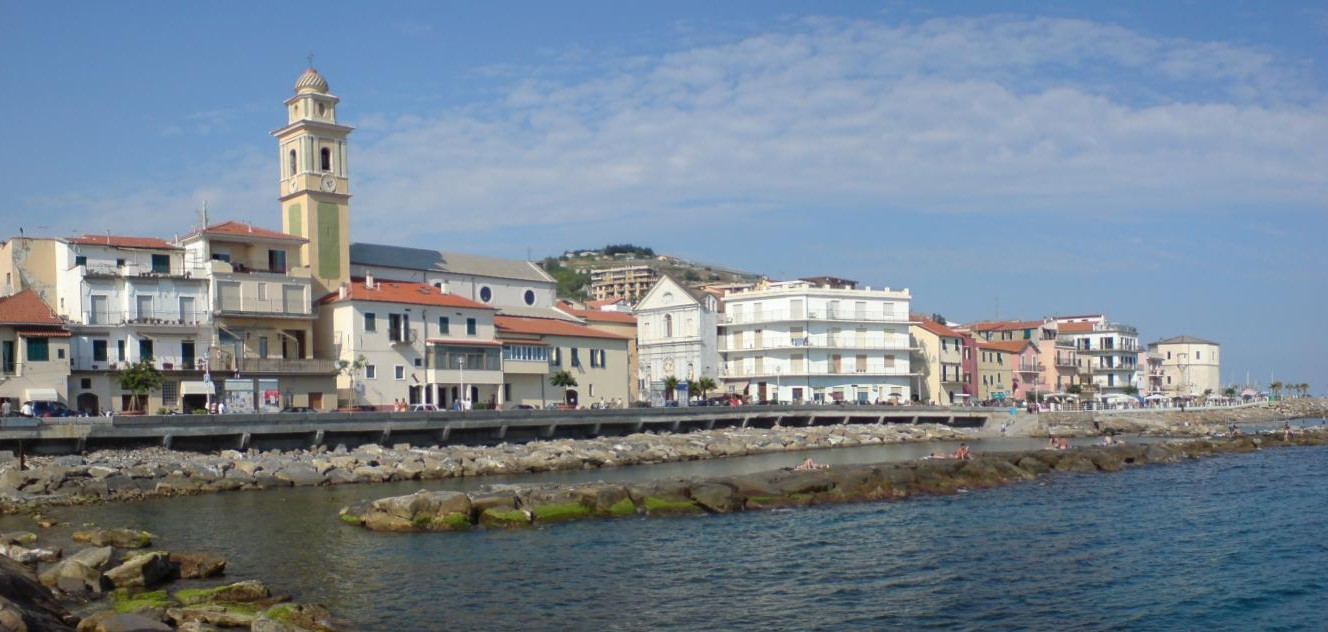
- View of Santo Stefano al Mare

- Coat of arms

- Location within Italy Location within Liguria
- Coordinates: 43°51′N 7°56′E
- Country: Italy
- Region: Liguria
- Province: Province of Imperia (IM)

Area
  - Total: 2.7 km^{2} (1.0 sq mi)

Population (Dec. 2004)
  - Total: 2,260
  - Density: 840/km^{2} (2,200/sq mi)
- Time zone: UTC+1 (CET)
  - Summer (DST): UTC+2 (CEST)
- Postal code: 18010
- Dialing code: 0184

Santo Stefano al Mare (Ligurian: San Stéva) is a comune (municipality) in the Province of Imperia in the Italian region Liguria, located about 100 kilometres (62 mi) southwest of Genoa and about 9 kilometres (6 mi) southwest of Imperia. As of 31 December 2004, it had a population of 2,260 and an area of 2.7 square kilometres (1.0 mi^{2}).

Santo Stefano al Mare borders the following municipalities: Cipressa, Pompeiana, Riva Ligure, and Terzorio.

== Geography ==
The town can be found on the Riviera of Ponente, at around eight miles (13 km) from the chief town of Genova. Its strategic placement helps to maintain a mild climate throughout the year, with temperatures rarely reaching the 0° in winter and overcoming the 30° in summer.

== Demographic development ==
Historical population

Year	Pop.	±%
1861	791	—
1871	662	−16.3%
1881	698	+5.4%
1901	618	−11.5%
1911	604	−2.3%

Year	Pop.	±%
1921	697	+15.4%
1931	751	+7.7%
1936	862	+14.8%
1951	1,018	+18.1%
1961	1,581	+55.3%

Year	Pop.	±%
1971	1,887	+19.4%
1981	2,211	+17.2%
1991	2,156	−2.5%
2001	2,073	−3.8%

Source: Data from ISTAT
