= Cipressa =

Cipressa A Çipressa
- Comune
- Comune di Cipressa
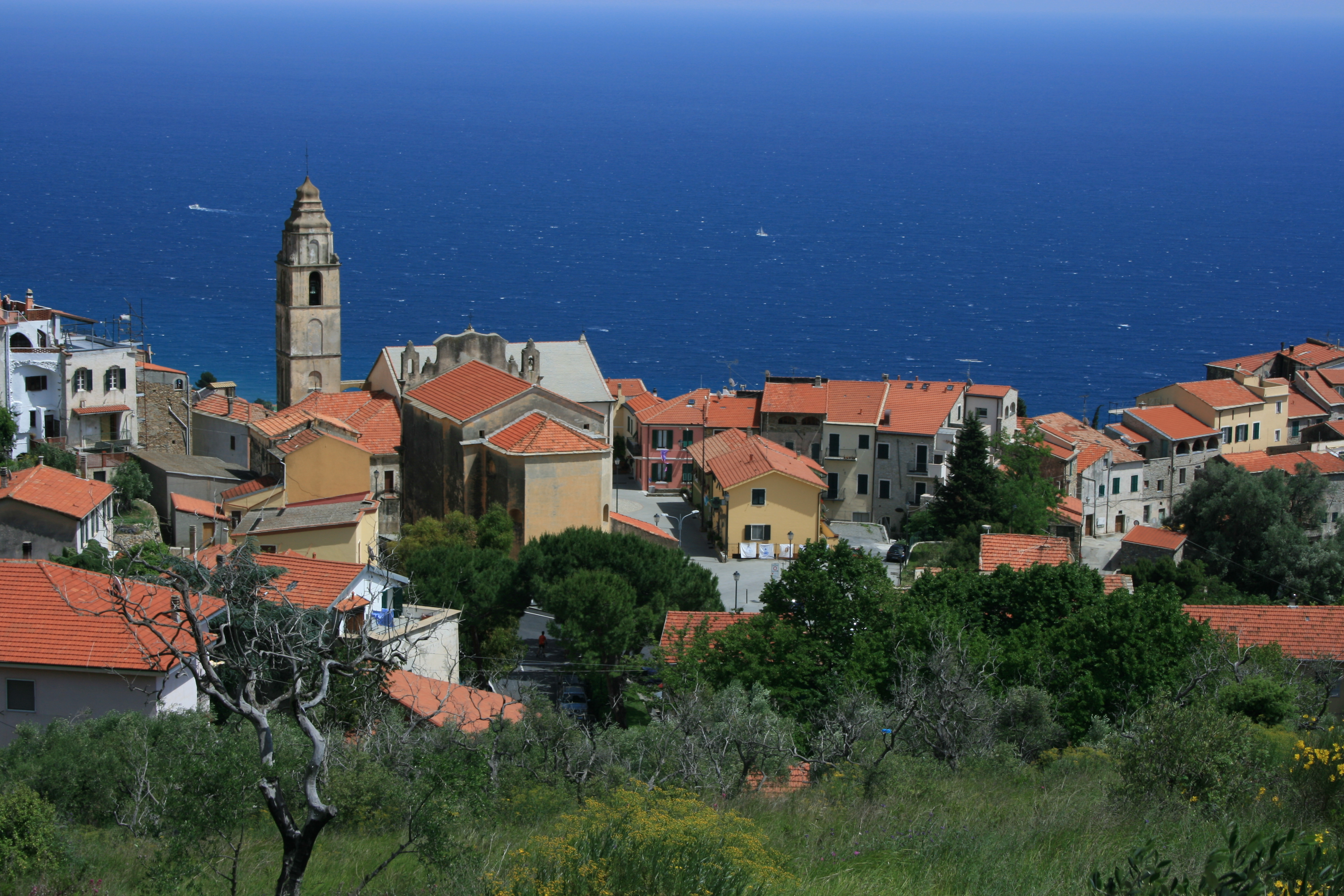
- View of Cipressa

- Coat of arms

- Location within Italy Location within Liguria
- Coordinates: 43°51′N 7°56′E
- Country: Italy
- Region: Liguria
- Province: Province of Imperia (IM)

Area
  - Total: 9.5 km^{2} (3.7 sq mi)

Population (Dec. 2004)
  - Total: 1,183
  - Density: 120/km^{2} (320/sq mi)
- Time zone: UTC+1 (CET)
  - Summer (DST): UTC+2 (CEST)
- Postal code: 18017
- Dialing code: 0183

Cipressa (Ligurian: A Çipressa) is a comune (municipality) in the Province of Imperia in the Italian region Liguria, located about 100 kilometres (62 mi) southwest of Genoa and about 9 kilometres (6 mi) southwest of Imperia. As of 31 December 2004, it had a population of 1,183 and an area of 9.5 square kilometres (3.7 mi^{2}).

Cipressa gives its name to one of two climbs that feature in the final kilometers of the prestigious Milan–Sanremo cycling race. Known as The Cipressa, the climb was added in 1982 to toughen the route before the final climb of The Poggio. The climb starts by the Mediterranean Sea at San Lorenzo al Mare, climbing to Cipressa by the via Cipressa, via Provinciale and the via Matteotti. The bell tower of Cipressa's church marks the end of the climb, and has become a notable landmark in cycling.

Cipressa borders the following municipalities: Civezza, Costarainera, Pietrabruna, Pompeiana, San Lorenzo al Mare, Santo Stefano al Mare, and Terzorio. Its frazione of Lingueglietta is one of I Borghi più belli d'Italia ("The most beautiful villages of Italy").

== Demographic evolution ==
Historical population

Year	Pop.	±%
1861	1,366	—
1871	1,256	−8.1%
1881	1,112	−11.5%
1901	948	−14.7%
1911	795	−16.1%

Year	Pop.	±%
1921	789	−0.8%
1931	726	−8.0%
1936	753	+3.7%
1951	879	+16.7%
1961	1,082	+23.1%

Year	Pop.	±%
1971	1,019	−5.8%
1981	1,047	+2.7%
1991	1,119	+6.9%
2001	1,157	+3.4%

Source: Data from ISTAT
