= Poggio di San Remo =

Hill in Italy

Coordinates: 43°49′30″N 7°48′54″E

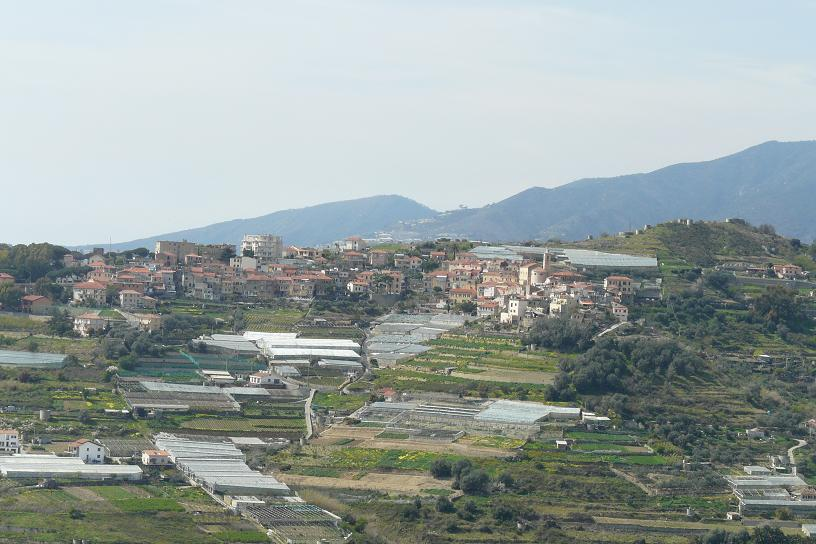
- Location: Sanremo, Liguria, Italy
- Gain in altitude: 149 m (489 ft)
- Length of climb: 4.0 km (2.5 mi)
- Maximum elevation: 169 m (554 ft)
- Average gradient: 3.7 %

The Poggio di San Remo is a hill in the Italian region Liguria, near Sanremo.

== Milan–San Remo ==
It is mainly known from road cycling, as it is the final climb in the classic Milan–San Remo. The climb is 4 kilometers long with an average gradient of 3.7%. It is often the site of decisive attacks to the win. From the top of the Poggio, 7 km from the finish, the course heads down via a fast and curvy descent towards the center of San Remo where the race traditionally finishes on the Via Roma, the city's illustrious shopping street. In recent years there has rarely been a big selection in the latter stages of the race. Many sprinters are able to keep up with the main peloton on the climbs, and therefore the race most often ends in a group sprint. Nonetheless, the location of the Poggio close to the finish has often meant that riders' position on top of the Poggio is crucial in order to win the race. Despite its flat course and long finishing straight, sprinters' teams have been foiled from time to time by a determined attack on the last hills.
