= List of teams and cyclists in the 1965 Giro d'Italia =

The 1965 Giro d'Italia was the 48th edition of the Giro d'Italia, one of cycling's Grand Tours. The field consisted of 100 riders, and 81 riders finished the race.

== By rider ==
Legend
No.	Starting number worn by the rider during the Giro
Pos.	Position in the general classification
DNF	Denotes a rider who did not finish

No.	Name	Nationality	Team	Ref
1	Italo Zilioli	Italy	Sanson	
2	Franco Balmamion	Italy	Sanson	
3	Antonio Bailetti	Italy	Sanson	
4	Vendramino Bariviera	Italy	Sanson	
5	Vittorio Casati	Italy	Sanson	
6	Carlo Chiappano	Italy	Sanson	
7	Luciano Galbo	Italy	Sanson	
8	Giancarlo Gentina	Italy	Sanson	
9	Loris Guernieri	Italy	Sanson	
10	Giuseppe Sartore	Italy	Sanson	
11	Romeo Venturelli	Italy	Bianchi–Mobylette	
12	Bruno Mealli	Italy	Bianchi–Mobylette	
13	Dino Zandegù	Italy	Bianchi–Mobylette	
14	Albano Negro	Italy	Bianchi–Mobylette	
15	Mario Maino	Italy	Bianchi–Mobylette	
16	Pierino Baffi	Italy	Bianchi–Mobylette	
17	Luciano Armani	Italy	Bianchi–Mobylette	
18	Renato Pelizzoni	Italy	Bianchi–Mobylette	
19	Antonio Tagliani	Italy	Bianchi–Mobylette	
20	Roberto Nencioli	Italy	Bianchi–Mobylette	
21	Franco Bitossi	Italy	Filotex	
22	Guido Carlesi	Italy	Filotex	
23	Vittorio Chiarini	Italy	Filotex	
24	Ugo Colombo	Italy	Filotex	
25	Guerrando Lenzi	Italy	Filotex	
26	Paolo Mannucci	Italy	Filotex	
27	Rolando Picchiotti	Italy	Filotex	
28	Alessandro Rimessi	Italy	Filotex	
29	Giordano Talamona	Italy	Filotex	
30	Mario Zanchi	Italy	Filotex	
31	Noël Foré	Belgium	Flandria–Romeo	
32	Walter Boucquet	Belgium	Flandria–Romeo	
33	Frans Brands	Belgium	Flandria–Romeo	
34	Yvo Molenaers	Belgium	Flandria–Romeo	
35	Marcel Ongenae	Belgium	Flandria–Romeo	
36	Romain Van Wynsberghe	Belgium	Flandria–Romeo	
37	Jean-Baptiste Claes	Belgium	Flandria–Romeo	
38	Lionel Van Damme	Belgium	Flandria–Romeo	
39	Francesco Miele	Italy	Flandria–Romeo	
40	Georges Vandenberghe	Belgium	Flandria–Romeo	
41	Franco Cribiori	Italy	Ignis	
42	Adriano Durante	Italy	Ignis	
43	Pasquale Fabbri	Italy	Ignis	
44	Renzo Fontona	Italy	Ignis	
45	Giampiero Macchi	Italy	Ignis	
46	Imerio Massignan	Italy	Ignis	
47	Adriano Passuello	Italy	Ignis	
48	Roberto Poggiali	Italy	Ignis	
49	Flaviano Vicentini	Italy	Ignis	
50	Marino Vigna	Italy	Ignis	
51	Pier-Giacomo Arrigoni	Italy	Legnano	
52	Franco Bodrero	Italy	Legnano	
53	Silvio Boni	Italy	Legnano	
54	Angelo Bugini	Italy	Legnano	
55	Egidio Cornale	Italy	Legnano	
56	Giuseppe Daglia	Italy	Legnano	
57	Giancarlo Ferretti	Italy	Legnano	
58	Bruno Peretti	Italy	Legnano	
59	Luciano Sambi	Italy	Legnano	
60	Silvano Schiavon	Italy	Legnano	
61	Marcello Mugnaini	Italy	Maino	
62	Giorgio Zancanaro	Italy	Maino	
63	Aldo Moser	Italy	Maino	
64	Enzo Moser	Italy	Maino	
65	Raffaele Marcoli	Italy	Maino	
66	Mario Zanin	Italy	Maino	
67	Marino Fontana	Italy	Maino	
68	Domenico Meldolesi	Italy	Maino	
69	Danilo Grassi	Italy	Maino	
70	Lorenzo Lorenzi	Italy	Maino	
71	Guido De Rosso	Italy	Molteni	
72	Michele Dancelli	Italy	Molteni	
73	René Binggeli	Switzerland	Molteni	
74	Giuseppe Fezzardi	Italy	Molteni	
75	Guido Neri	Italy	Molteni	
76	Tomasso De Pra	Italy	Molteni	
77	Carlo Brugnami	Italy	Molteni	
78	Pietro Scandelli	Italy	Molteni	
79	Aldo Beraldo	Italy	Molteni	
80	Giacomo Fornoni	Italy	Molteni	
81	Vittorio Adorni	Italy	Salvarani	
82	Felice Gimondi	Italy	Salvarani	
83	Battista Babini	Italy	Salvarani	
84	Italo Mazzacurati	Italy	Salvarani	
85	Mario Minieri	Italy	Salvarani	
86	Arnaldo Pambianco	Italy	Salvarani	
87	Pietro Partesotti	Italy	Salvarani	
88	Vittorio Poletti	Italy	Salvarani	
89	Gilberto Vendemiati	Italy	Salvarani	
90	Vito Taccone	Italy	Salvarani	
91	Severino Andreoli	Italy	Vittadello	
92	Graziano Battistini	Italy	Vittadello	
93	Renzo Baldan	Italy	Vittadello	
94	Lorenzo Carminati	Italy	Vittadello	
95	Aldo Pifferi	Italy	Vittadello	
96	Alfredo Sabbadin	Italy	Vittadello	
97	Danilo Ferrari	Italy	Vittadello	
98	Angelo Ottaviani	Italy	Vittadello	
99	Vincenzo Meco	Italy	Vittadello	
100	Aristide Baldan	Italy	Vittadello	
