= 1964 Giro d'Italia =

Race details
- Dates: 16 May - 7 June 1964
- Stages: 22
- Distance: 4,119 km (2,559 mi)
- Winning time: 115h 10' 27"

Results
Jersey awarded to the overall winner	Winner	Jacques Anquetil (FRA)	(Saint-Raphaël)
	Second	Italo Zilioli (ITA)	(Carpano)
	Third	Guido De Rosso (ITA)	(Molteni)
	Mountains	Franco Bitossi (ITA)	(Springoil-Fuchs)
	Team	Saint-Raphaël	

The 1964 Giro d'Italia was the 47th running of the Giro d'Italia, one of cycling's Grand Tour races. The Giro started in Bolzano, on 16 May, with a 173 km (107.5 mi) mass-start stage and concluded back in Milan, on 7 June, with a 146 km (90.7 mi) leg. A total of 130 riders from 13 teams entered the 22-stage race, which was won by Frenchman Jacques Anquetil of the Saint-Raphaël team. The second and third places were taken by Italian riders Italo Zilioli and Guido De Rosso, respectively.

== Teams ==
A total of 13 teams were invited to participate in the 1964 Giro d'Italia. Each team sent a squad of ten riders, so the Giro began with a peloton of 130 cyclists. Out of the 130 riders that started this edition of the Giro d'Italia, a total of 97 riders made it to the finish in Milan.

The 13 teams that took part in the race were:

- Cynar–Frejus
- Carpano
- Cite
- Flandria–Romeo
- Gazzola
- IBAC
- Ignis
- Legnano
- Lygie
- Molteni
- Salvarani
- Springoil–Fuchs
- Saint-Raphaël–Gitane–Dunlop

== Route and stages ==
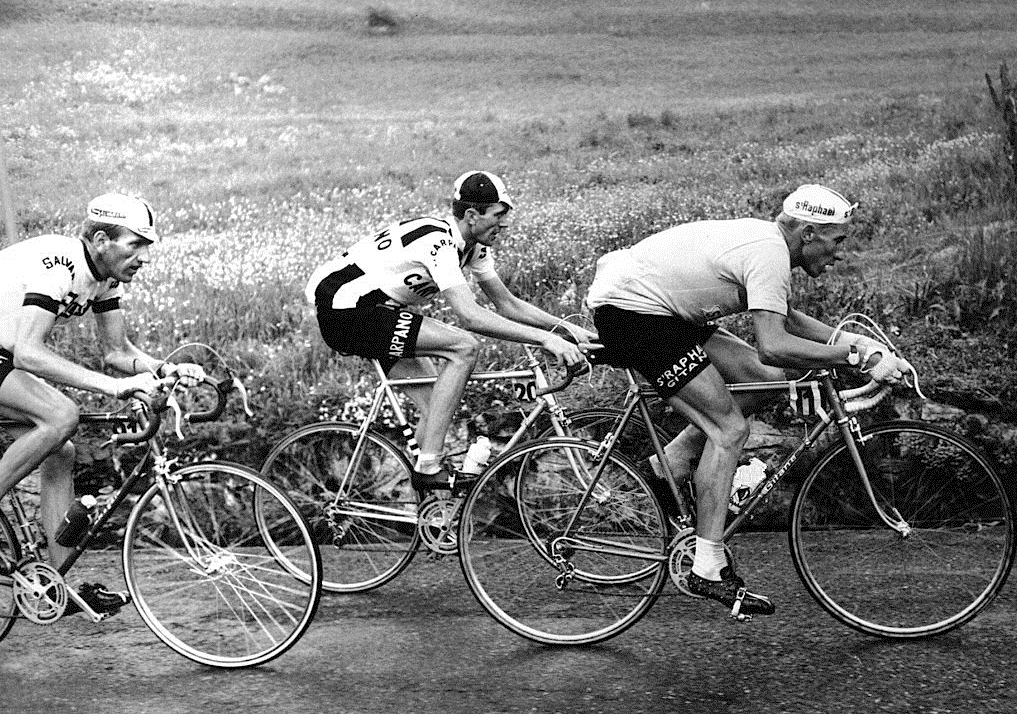
Italo Zilioli (middle), Jacques Anquetil (right), and Vittorio Adorni (left) riding together during the 21st stage.

The race route was revealed to the public on 31 March 1964 by race director Vincenzo Torriani.

Stage results
Stage	Date	Course	Distance	Type	Winner
1	16 May	Bolzano to Riva del Garda	173 km (107 mi)	Plain stage	Vittorio Adorni (ITA)
2	17 May	Riva del Garda to Brescia	146 km (91 mi)	Plain stage	Michele Dancelli (ITA)
3	18 May	Brescia to San Pellegrino Terme	193 km (120 mi)	Stage with mountain(s)	Franco Bitossi (ITA)
4	19 May	San Pellegrino Terme to Parma	189 km (117 mi)	Plain stage	Vito Taccone (ITA)
5	20 May	Parma to Busseto	50 km (31 mi)	Individual time trial	Jacques Anquetil (FRA)
6	21 May	Parma to Verona	100 km (62 mi)	Plain stage	Vendramino Bariviera (ITA)
7	22 May	Verona to Lavarone	168 km (104 mi)	Stage with mountain(s)	Angelino Soler (ESP)
8	23 May	Lavarone to Pedavena	183 km (114 mi)	Stage with mountain(s)	Marcello Mugnaini (ITA)
9	24 May	Feltre to Marina di Ravenna	260 km (162 mi)	Plain stage	Pietro Zoppas (ITA)
10	25 May	Marina di Ravenna to City of San Marino (San Marino)	135 km (84 mi)	Stage with mountain(s)	Rolf Maurer (SUI)
11	26 May	Rimini to San Benedetto del Tronto	185 km (115 mi)	Plain stage	Raffaele Marcoli (ITA)
12	27 May	San Benedetto del Tronto to Roccaraso	257 km (160 mi)	Stage with mountain(s)	Walter Boucquet (BEL)
13	28 May	Roccaraso to Caserta	188 km (117 mi)	Plain stage	Giorgio Zancanaro (ITA)
14	29 May	Caserta to Castel Gandolfo	210 km (130 mi)	Plain stage	Vittorio Adorni (ITA)
15	30 May	Rome to Montepulciano	214 km (133 mi)	Stage with mountain(s)	Nino Defilippis (ITA)
16	31 May	Montepulciano to Livorno	199 km (124 mi)	Plain stage	Franco Bitossi (ITA)
17	1 June	Livorno to Santa Margherita Ligure	210 km (130 mi)	Plain stage	Franco Bitossi (ITA)
	2 June	Rest day			
18	3 June	Santa Margherita Ligure to Alessandria	205 km (127 mi)	Stage with mountain(s)	Bruno Mealli (ITA)
19	4 June	Alessandria to Cuneo	205 km (127 mi)	Plain stage	Cees Lute (NED)
20	5 June	Cuneo to Pinerolo	254 km (158 mi)	Stage with mountain(s)	Franco Bitossi (ITA)
21	6 June	Turin to Biella	200 km (124 mi)	Stage with mountain(s)	Gianni Motta (ITA)
22	7 June	Biella to Milan	146 km (91 mi)	Plain stage	Willi Altig (FRG)
	Total		4,119 km (2,559 mi)		

== Classification leadership ==
One leader's jersey was worn during the 1964 Giro d'Italia: the leader of the general classification – calculated by adding the stage finish times of each rider – wore a pink jersey. This classification is the most important of the race, and its winner is considered as the winner of the Giro. There were no time bonuses in 1964.

A major secondary classification was the mountains classification. In this ranking, points were won by reaching the summit of a climb ahead of other cyclists. There were two categories of mountains. The first category awarded 50, 30, and 20 points and the second distributed 30, 20, and 10 points.

There were also intermediate sprints, called "traguardi tricolori", and there was a classification related to these. The first three riders at each intermediate sprint scored points.

Although no jersey was awarded, there was also one classification for the teams, in which the teams were awarded points for their rider's performance during the stages. This classification was named the "Ramazzotti" classification, and points were given for high positions in stages, intermediate sprints and mountain tops, and leading the general classification.

Classification leadership by stage
Stage	Winner	General classification	Mountains classification	Traguardi Tricolori classification	Team classification
1	Vittorio Adorni	Vittorio Adorni	not awarded	Silvano Ciampi	Salvarani
2	Michele Dancelli	Michele Dancelli	not awarded	Silvano Ciampi	Salvarani
3	Franco Bitossi	Enzo Moser	Antonio Gomez del Moral	Silvano Ciampi	Molteni
4	Vito Taccone	Enzo Moser	Antonio Gomez del Moral	Silvano Ciampi	Salvarani
5	Jacques Anquetil	Jacques Anquetil	Antonio Gomez del Moral	Silvano Ciampi	Salvarani
6	Mino Bariviera	Jacques Anquetil	Antonio Gomez del Moral	Silvano Ciampi	Salvarani
7	Angelino Soler	Jacques Anquetil	Antonio Gomez del Moral	Silvano Ciampi	Salvarani
8	Marcello Mugnaini	Jacques Anquetil	Antonio Gomez del Moral	Silvano Ciampi	Salvarani
9	Pietro Zoppas	Jacques Anquetil	Vito Taccone	Raffaele Marcoli	Salvarani
10	Rolf Maurer	Jacques Anquetil	Vito Taccone	Raffaele Marcoli	Salvarani
11	Raffaele Marcoli	Jacques Anquetil	Vito Taccone	Raffaele Marcoli	Salvarani
12	Walter Boucquet	Jacques Anquetil	Vito Taccone	Raffaele Marcoli	Saint-Raphaël
13	Giorgio Zancanaro	Jacques Anquetil	Vito Taccone	Raffaele Marcoli	Carpano
14	Vittorio Adorni	Jacques Anquetil	Vito Taccone	Raffaele Marcoli	Carpano
15	Nino Defilippis	Jacques Anquetil	Vito Taccone	Raffaele Marcoli	Carpano
16	Franco Bitossi	Jacques Anquetil	Vito Taccone	Raffaele Marcoli	Carpano
17	Franco Bitossi	Jacques Anquetil	Vito Taccone	Raffaele Marcoli	Carpano
18	Bruno Mealli	Jacques Anquetil	Vito Taccone	Raffaele Marcoli	Carpano
19	Cees Lute	Jacques Anquetil	Vito Taccone	Raffaele Marcoli	Saint-Raphaël
20	Franco Bitossi	Jacques Anquetil	Franco Bitossi	Raffaele Marcoli	Saint-Raphaël
21	Gianni Motta	Jacques Anquetil	Franco Bitossi	Raffaele Marcoli	Saint-Raphaël
22	Willi Altig	Jacques Anquetil	Franco Bitossi	Raffaele Marcoli	Saint-Raphaël
Final		Jacques Anquetil	Franco Bitossi	Raffaele Marcoli	Saint-Raphaël

== Final standings ==
Legend
Pink jersey	Denotes the winner of the General classification

=== General classification ===
Final general classification (1–10)
Rank	Name	Team	Time
1	Jacques Anquetil (FRA)	Saint-Raphaël	115h 10' 27"
2	Italo Zilioli (ITA)	Carpano	+ 1' 22"
3	Guido De Rosso (ITA)	Molteni	+ 1' 31"
4	Vittorio Adorni (ITA)	Salvarani	+ 2' 22"
5	Gianni Motta (ITA)	Molteni	+ 2' 38"
6	Renzo Fontona (ITA)	Ignis	+ 3' 30"
7	Marcello Mugnaini (ITA)	Lygie	+ 5' 05"
8	Franco Balmamion (ITA)	Cynar	+ 6' 00"
9	Rolf Maurer (SUI)	Cynar	+ 7' 47"
10	Franco Bitossi (ITA)	Springoil-Fuchs	+ 9' 20"

=== Mountains classification ===
Final mountains classification (1–10)
	Name	Team	Points
1	Franco Bitossi (ITA)	Springoil-Fuchs	200
2	Antonio Gomez del Moral (ESP)	Ignis	140
3	Franco Balmamion (ITA)	Cynar	110
3	Vito Taccone (ITA)	Salvarani	110
5	Italo Zilioli (ITA)	Carpano	70
6	Enzo Moser (ITA)	Lygie	50
6	Aldo Moser (ITA)	Lygie	50
6	Arnaldo Pambianco (ITA)	Salvarani	50
9	Guido De Rosso (ITA)	Molteni	40
10	Bruno Peretti (ITA)	Legnano	30
10	Roberto Poggiali (ITA)	Ignis	30
10	Giorgio Zancanaro (ITA)	Carpano	30
10	Nino Defilippis (ITA)	Ibac	30
10	Salvador Honrubia (ESP)	Cite	30
10	Michele Dancelli (ITA)	Molteni	30
10	Louis Rostollan (FRA)	Saint-Raphaël	30
10	Gianni Motta (ITA)	Molteni	30

=== Traguardi tricolori classification ===
Final traguardi tricolori classification (1–10)
	Name	Team	Points
1	Raffaele Marcoli (ITA)	Legnano	100
2	Silvano Ciampi (ITA)	Springoil-Fuchs	50
3	Italo Zilioli (ITA)	Carpano	40
3	Willi Altig (FRG)	Saint-Raphaël	40
5	Antonio Franchi (ITA)	Salvarani	33
6	Luigi Mele (ITA)	Gazzola	30
6	Salvador Honrubia (ESP)	Cite	30
8	Antonio Bailetti (ITA)	Carpano	25
8	Guy Ignolin (FRA)	Saint-Raphaël	25
8	Arnaldo Pambianco (ITA)	Salvarani	25

=== Teams classification ===
Final team classification (1–10)
	Team	Points
1	Saint-Raphaël	2945
2	Springoil-Fuchs	2620
3	Salvarani	2480
4	Carpano	2470
5	Molteni	2150
6	Cynar	2075
7	Lygie	1885
8	Ignis	1820
9	Flandria Romeo	1750
10	Ibac	1360
