= Galbo (surname) =

Galbo (Italian) or Galbó (Catalan) is a surname. Notable people with the surname include:

- Cristina Galbó (born 1950), Spanish actress
- Luciano Galbo (1943–2011), Italian racing cyclist

== See also ==
- Rick Galbos (born 1951), American footballer
