= 1965 Tour de Suisse =

Race details
- Dates: 10–16 June 1965
- Stages: 7
- Distance: 1,307 km (812.1 mi)
- Winning time: 36h 31' 17"

Results
	Winner	Franco Bitossi (ITA)	(Filotex)
	Second	Jos Huysmans (BEL)	(Dr. Mann)
	Third	Marcello Mugnaini (ITA)	(Maino)
	Mountains	Alfred Rüegg (SUI)	(Tigra–Meltina)
	Team	Maino	

The 1965 Tour de Suisse was the 29th edition of the Tour de Suisse cycle race and was held from 10 June to 16 June 1965. The race started in Murten and finished in Bern. The race was won by Franco Bitossi of the Filotex team.

== General classification ==
Final general classification

Rank	Rider	Team	Time
1	Franco Bitossi (ITA)	Filotex	36h 31' 17"
2	Jos Huysmans (BEL)	Dr. Mann	+ 3' 00"
3	Marcello Mugnaini (ITA)	Maino	+ 3' 36"
4	Walter Boucquet (BEL)	Flandria–Romeo	+ 6' 18"
5	Ugo Colombo (ITA)	Filotex	+ 7' 59"
6	Enzo Moser (ITA)	Maino	+ 10' 16"
7	Marino Fontana (ITA)	Maino	+ 11' 17"
8	Herman Van Springel (BEL)	Dr. Mann	+ 11' 59"
9	Alfred Rüegg (SUI)	Cynar–Allegro	+ 12' 12"
10	Dieter Wiedemann (FRG)	Torpedo–Fichtel & Sachs	+ 12' 18"
