= Pietro Zoppas =

Italian cyclist (1934–2020)

Personal information
- Born: 27 April 1934 Scomigo, Conegliano, Italy
- Died: 17 June 2020 (aged 86) Scomigo, Conegliano, Italy

Cycling career
- Sport: Cycling
- Discipline: Road
- Role: Rider

Professional teams
- 1960: San Pellegrino
- 1961–1962: Atala
- 1963–1964: Cite
- 1965–1966: Vittadello

Pietro Zoppas (27 April 1934 – 17 June 2020) was an Italian racing cyclist. He won stage 9 of the 1964 Giro d'Italia.

== Major results ==
1956
1st Trofeo Città di San Vendemiano
1957
1st La Popolarissima
1960
8th Coppa Sabatini
1961
5th Milano–Vignola
1964
1st Stage 9 Giro d'Italia
