= Marino Fontana =

Italian road cyclist

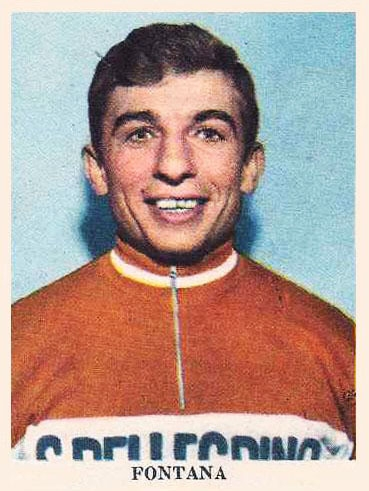

Personal information
- Born: 14 March 1936 Caldogno, Italy
- Died: 11 June 2013 (aged 77) Caldogno, Italy

Cycling career
- Sport: Cycling
- Discipline: Road
- Role: Rider; Directeur sportif

Professional teams
- 1960–1963: San Pellegrino
- 1964: Lygie
- 1965: Maino
- 1966: Mainetti

Managerial teams
- 1967: Mainetti
- 1969–1971: Molteni
- 1973–1977: Jollj Ceramica

Marino Fontana (14 March 1936 – 11 June 2013) was an Italian road cyclist. Professional from 1960 to 1966, he notably won the 1961 Giro di Toscana and finished third in the 1960 Giro di Lombardia. He also rode in seven races of the Giro d'Italia, with his best finish being 21st in 1963. After retiring, he worked as a directeur sportif for several teams.

== Major results ==
1955
1st Trofeo Alcide Degasperi
1957
2nd Piccolo Giro di Lombardia
1959
2nd Piccolo Giro di Lombardia
1960
3rd Giro di Lombardia
5th Coppa Agostoni
1961
1st Giro di Toscana
4th Giro di Romagna
1962
2nd Giro di Romagna
4th Coppa Placci
9th Giro di Toscana
1963
3rd Giro di Romagna
4th Overall Tour de Romandie
4th Züri-Metzgete
4th Giro di Toscana
1964
2nd Giro del Lazio
3rd Col San Martino
10th Milano–Vignola
1965
7th Overall Tour de Suisse
1966
5th Züri-Metzgete
