= Salamini–Luxor TV =

Italian cycling team (1966–1967)

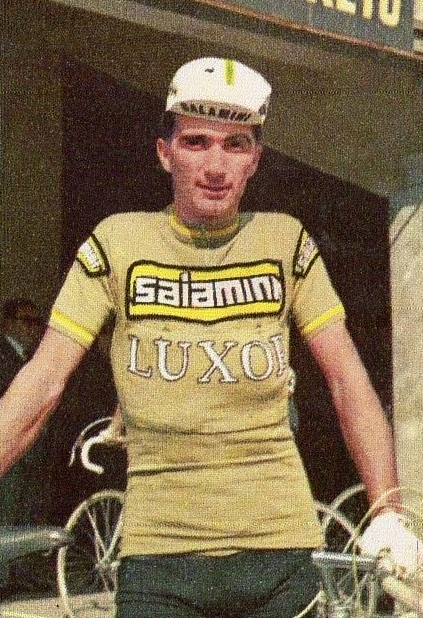
- Pietro Guerra c. 1967

Team information
- Registered: Italy
- Founded: 1966
- Disbanded: 1967
- Discipline: Road

Key personnel
- Team manager: Ercole Baldini

Team name history
- 1966–1967: Salamini–Luxor TV

Salamini–Luxor TV was an Italian professional cycling team that existed from 1966 to 1967. The team competed in the 1967 Giro d'Italia, with their rider Vittorio Adorni winning stage 20. Adorni also notably won the overall classification of the 1967 Tour de Romandie with the team.

== Major wins ==
1967
Stage 20 Giro d'Italia, Vittorio Adorni
Overall Tour de Romandie, Vittorio Adorni
Coppa Bernocchi, Vittorio Adorni
Giro di Romagna, Bruno Mealli
Giro di Sardegna, Luciano Armani
GP Monaco, Luciano Armani
Coppa Placci, Luciano Armani
