= Altig =

Altig is a German surname, probably derived from a short form of ay ancient German given name with the stem alt- meaning "old". Notable people with the surname include:

- Ludwig Altig (1926–2003) German Oberliga footballer
- Rudi Altig (1937–2016), German cyclist
- Willi Altig (born 1935), German cyclist
