= Enzo Moser =

Italian cyclist (1940–2008)

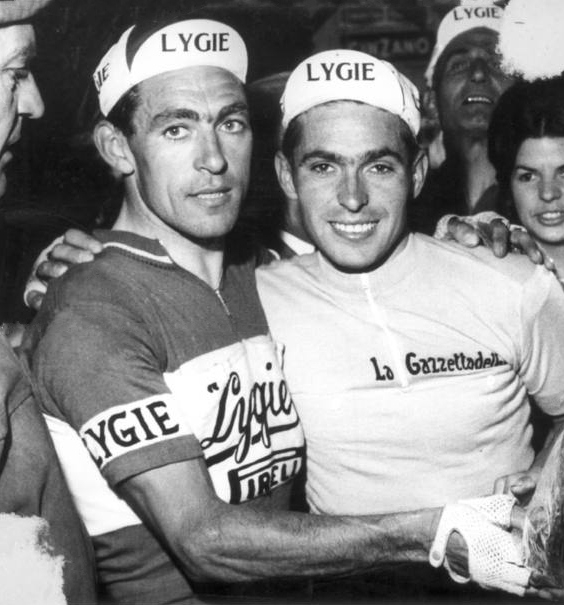
- Aldo and Enzo Moser (right) in 1964

Personal information
- Full name: Enzo Moser
- Born: 5 November 1940 Palù di Giovo, Italy
- Died: 25 July 2008 (aged 67) Palù di Giovo, Italy

Cycling career
- Sport: Cycling
- Discipline: Road
- Role: Rider

Professional teams
- 1962–1963: San Pellegrino
- 1964: Lygie
- 1965: Maino
- 1966–1967: Vittadello

Major wins
- Giro del Trentino (1962)

Enzo Moser (5 November 1940 – 25 July 2008) was an Italian professional road bicycle racer from 1962 to 1967. He was the first winner of the Giro del Trentino in 1962. He came from a famous family of cyclists, the most famous of whom is his younger brother Francesco Moser, which also includes older brother Aldo, younger brother Diego and nephews Leonardo Moser and Moreno Moser, all of whom are or were professional cyclists. His achievements also include two days in the pink jersey during the 1964 Giro d'Italia. He was born in Palù di Giovo, Trentino, which incidentally is also the birthplace of Gilberto Simoni. He was killed in an agricultural accident on 25 July 2008.

== Major results ==
1961
1st Trofeo Alcide Degasperi
1962
1st Overall Giro del Trentino
10th Coppa Placci
1963
4th Giro dell'Emilia
1964
10th Coppa Placci
1965
5th Giro di Romagna
6th Overall Tour de Suisse
