= 1965 Giro d'Italia =

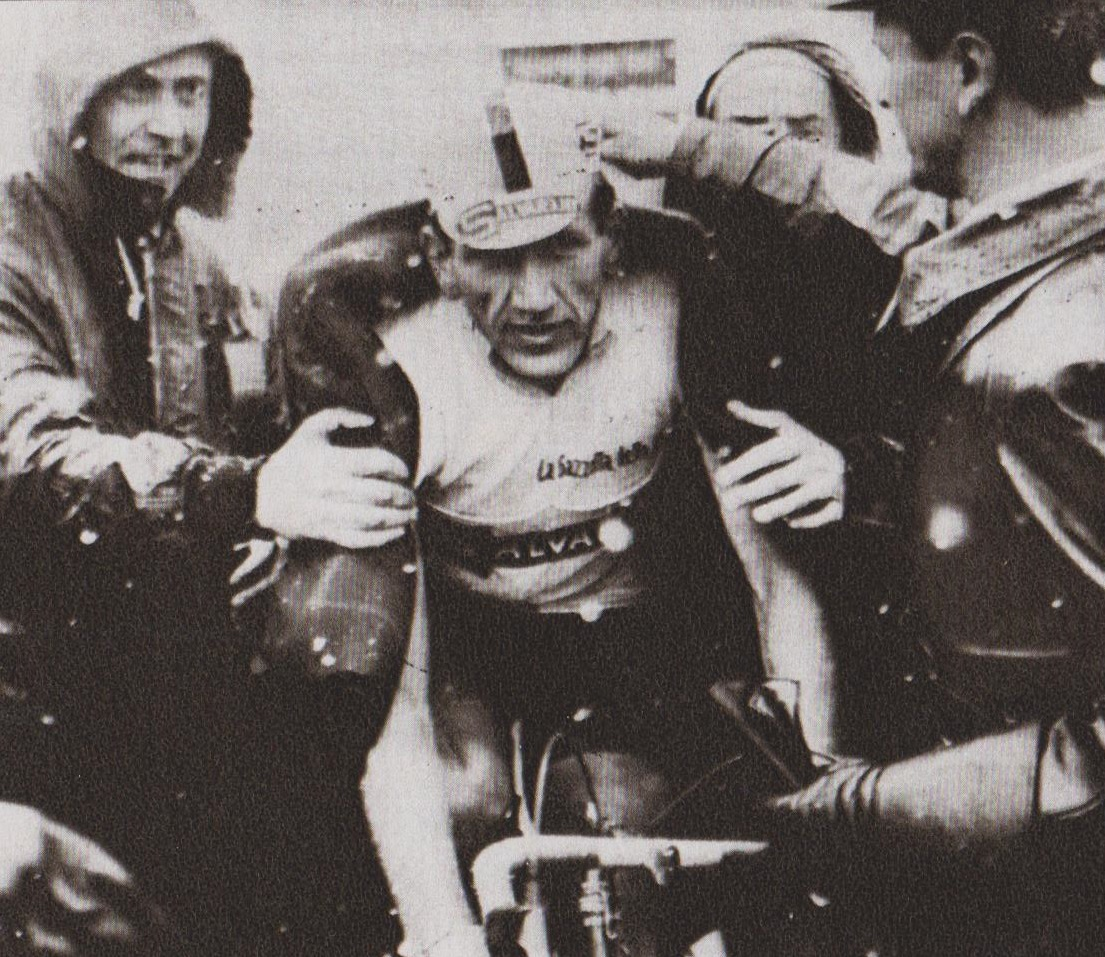

Race details
- Dates: 15 May - 6 June 1965
- Stages: 22
- Distance: 4,051 km (2,517 mi)
- Winning time: 121h 08' 18"

Results
Jersey awarded to the overall winner	Winner	Vittorio Adorni (ITA)	(Salvarani)
	Second	Italo Zilioli (ITA)	(Sanson)
	Third	Felice Gimondi (ITA)	(Salvarani)
	Mountains	Franco Bitossi (ITA)	(Filotex)

The 1965 Giro d'Italia was the 48th running of the Giro d'Italia, one of cycling's Grand Tour races. The Giro started in San Marino, on 15 May, with a 295 km (183.3 mi) stage and concluded in Florence, on 6 June, with a 136 km (84.5 mi) leg. A total of 100 riders from 10 teams entered the 22-stage race, which was won by Italian Vittorio Adorni of the Salvarani team. The second and third places were taken by Italian riders Italo Zilioli and Felice Gimondi, respectively.

== Teams ==
Ten teams were invited by the race organizers to participate in the 1965 edition of the Giro d'Italia. Each team sent a squad of ten riders, which meant that the race started with a peloton of 100 cyclists. From the riders that began the race, 80 made it to the finish in Florence.

The teams entering the race were:

- Sanson
- Bianchi–Mobylette
- Filotex
- Flandria–Romeo
- Ignis
- Legnano
- Maino
- Molteni
- Salvarani
- Vittadello

From the 100 riders that started the Giro, only 10 were not Italian.

== Route and stages ==
The race route was revealed to the public on 25 March 1965 by race director Vincenzo Torriani. San Marino hosted the start of the race, which marked the first time in race history that the race began outside of Italy. The small country only hosted the stage's start as the stage concluded in Perugia.

To transfer from Sicily to Milan, a plane flight was planned during the rest day. This caused some controversy, because not all riders were happy to fly, and some chose to travel by train.

The twentieth stage was originally planned to end in Solda after 190 km, but was shortened to end on the Passo dello Stelvio because of the risk of an avalanche.

Stage characteristics and winners
Stage	Date	Course	Distance	Type	Winner
1	15 May	City of San Marino (San Marino) to Perugia	198 km (123 mi)	Stage with mountain(s)	Michele Dancelli (ITA)
2	16 May	Perugia to L'Aquila	180 km (112 mi)	Stage with mountain(s)	Guido Carlesi (ITA)
3	17 May	L'Aquila to Rocca di Cambio	199 km (124 mi)	Stage with mountain(s)	Luciano Galbo (ITA)
4	18 May	Rocca di Cambio to Benevento	239 km (149 mi)	Stage with mountain(s)	Adriano Durante (ITA)
5	19 May	Benevento to Avellino	175 km (109 mi)	Stage with mountain(s)	Michele Dancelli (ITA)
6	20 May	Avellino to Potenza	161 km (100 mi)	Stage with mountain(s)	Vittorio Adorni (ITA)
7	21 May	Potenza to Maratea	164 km (102 mi)	Plain stage	Luciano Armani (ITA)
8	22 May	Maratea to Catanzaro	103 km (64 mi)	Plain stage	Frans Brands (BEL)
9	23 May	Catanzaro to Reggio Calabria	161 km (100 mi)	Stage with mountain(s)	Adriano Durante (ITA)
10	24 May	Messina to Palermo	260 km (162 mi)	Plain stage	Domenico Meldolesi (ITA)
11	25 May	Palermo to Agrigento	146 km (91 mi)	Plain stage	Guido Carlesi (ITA)
12	26 May	Agrigento to Siracusa	230 km (143 mi)	Plain stage	Raffaele Marcoli (ITA)
13	27 May	Catania to Taormina	50 km (31 mi)	Individual time trial	Vittorio Adorni (ITA)
	28 May	Rest day			
14	29 May	Milan to Novi Ligure	100 km (62 mi)	Plain stage	Danilo Grassi (ITA)
15	30 May	Novi Ligure to Diano Marina	223 km (139 mi)	Stage with mountain(s)	Bruno Mealli (ITA)
16	31 May	Diano Marina to Turin	205 km (127 mi)	Stage with mountain(s)	Aldo Pifferi (ITA)
17	1 June	Turin to Biandronno	163 km (101 mi)	Plain stage	Raffaele Marcoli (ITA)
18	2 June	Biandronno to Saas Fee (Switzerland)	178 km (111 mi)	Stage with mountain(s)	Italo Zilioli (ITA)
19	3 June	Saas Fee (Switzerland) to Madesimo	282 km (175 mi)	Stage with mountain(s)	Vittorio Adorni (ITA)
20	4 June	Madesimo to Passo dello Stelvio	160 km (99 mi)	Stage with mountain(s)	Graziano Battistini (ITA)
21	5 June	Bormio to Brescia	179 km (111 mi)	Stage with mountain(s)	Franco Bitossi (ITA)
22	6 June	Brescia to Florence	295 km (183 mi)	Plain stage	René Binggeli (SUI)
	Total		4,051 km (2,517 mi)		

== Race summary ==
Adorni took the lead in stage six, but lost it in stage eight because of a break-away that took 15 minutes. Adorni re-took the lead in an individual time trial, and increased his lead to a margin that had not been seen since Fausto Coppi won in 1949.

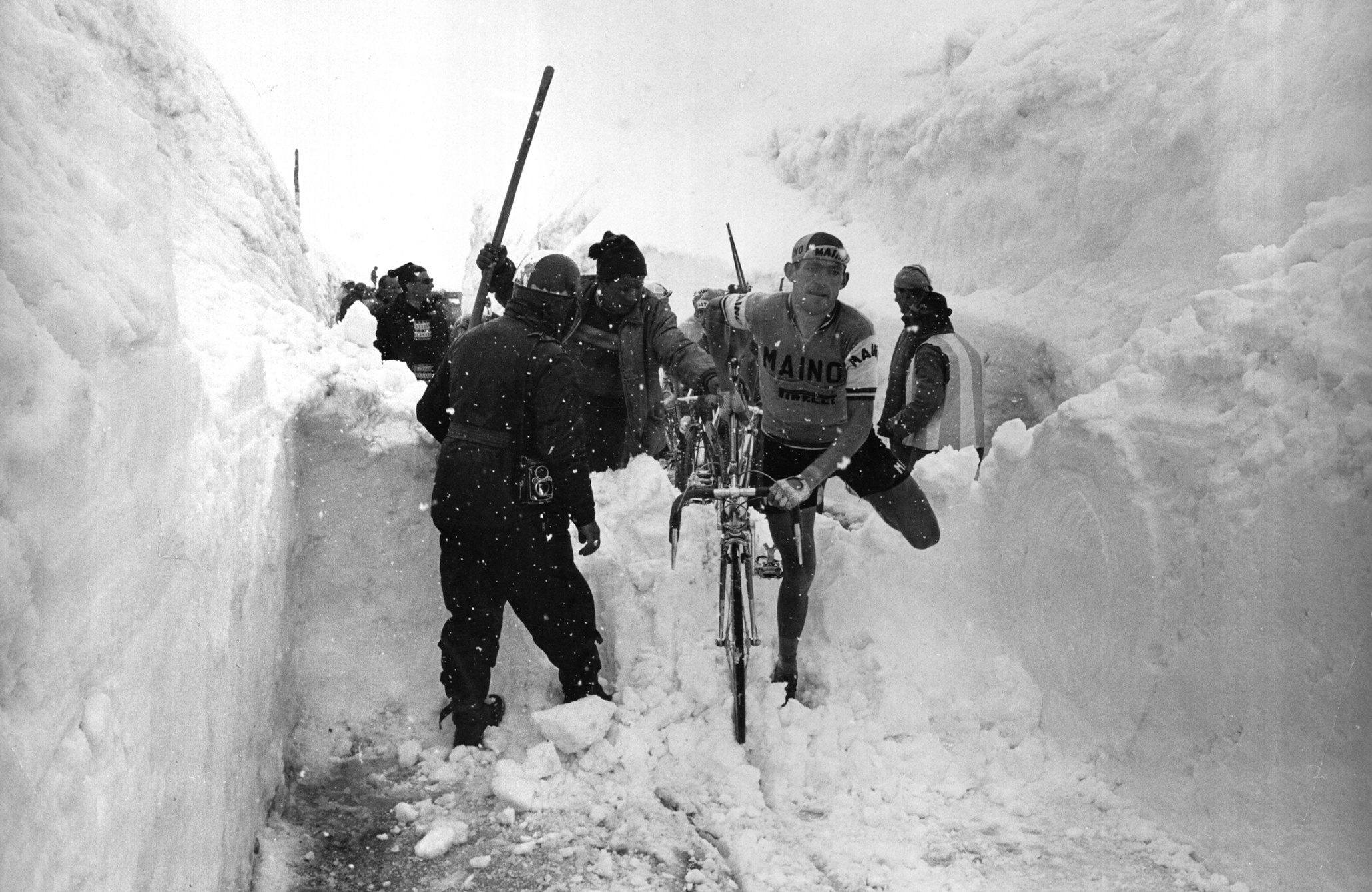
Aldo Moser navigating the snow atop the Stelvio Pass during the 20th stage

The twentieth stage ended on the Passo dello Stelvio. The top was covered by snow, and cyclists had to cross it on foot. When Graziano Battistini reached the finish line as the stage winner, he did not celebrate but asked for a blanket.

== Classification leadership ==
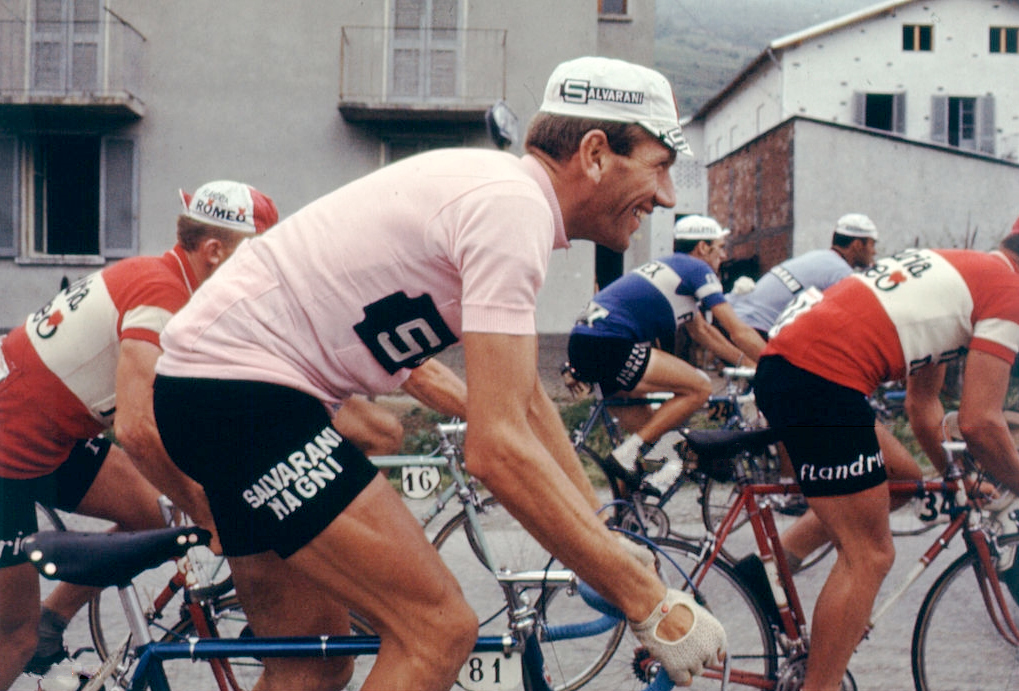
Vittorio Adorni wearing the pink jersey during the 20th stage

One leader's jersey was worn during the 1965 Giro d'Italia. The leader of the general classification – calculated by adding the stage finish times of each rider – wore a pink jersey. This classification is the most important of the race, and its winner is considered as the winner of the Giro. There were no time bonuses in 1965.

A major secondary classification was the mountains classification. In this ranking, points were won by reaching the summit of a climb ahead of other cyclists. There were three categories of mountains. The first category awarded 50, 40, 30, 20, and 10 points, the second distributed 40, 30, 20, and 10 points, and the third category gave 30, 20, and 10 points. In addition, the Cima Coppi was introduced: the highest climb of the Giro gave 200, 100, 80, 70 and 50 points. From this year on, a rider had to finish the Giro to be eligible for the mountains classification.

There was also a classification for intermediate sprints, named the Traguardi tricolori in honor of the Italian flag, where riders scored 15, 10 and 5 points at each intermediate sprint.

Classification leadership by stage
Stage	Winner	General classification	Mountains classification
1	Michele Dancelli	Michele Dancelli	not awarded
2	Guido Carlesi	Carlo Chiappano	not awarded
3	Luciano Galbo	Luciano Galbo	Vito Taccone & Antonio Bailetti
4	Adriano Durante	Albano Negro	Michele Dancelli
5	Michele Dancelli	Albano Negro	Michele Dancelli
6	Vittorio Adorni	Vittorio Adorni	Michele Dancelli
7	Luciano Armani	Vittorio Adorni	Michele Dancelli
8	Frans Brands	Bruno Mealli	Michele Dancelli
9	Adriano Durante	Bruno Mealli	Michele Dancelli
10	Domenico Meldolesi	Bruno Mealli	Michele Dancelli
11	Guido Carlesi	Bruno Mealli	Michele Dancelli
12	Raffaele Marcoli	Bruno Mealli	Michele Dancelli
13	Vittorio Adorni	Vittorio Adorni	Michele Dancelli
14	Danilo Grassi	Vittorio Adorni	Michele Dancelli
15	Bruno Mealli	Vittorio Adorni	Michele Dancelli
16	Aldo Pifferi	Vittorio Adorni	Franco Bitossi
17	Raffaele Marcoli	Vittorio Adorni	Franco Bitossi
18	Italo Zilioli	Vittorio Adorni	Franco Bitossi
19	Vittorio Adorni	Vittorio Adorni	Franco Bitossi
20	Graziano Battistini	Vittorio Adorni	Franco Bitossi
21	Franco Bitossi	Vittorio Adorni	Franco Bitossi
22	René Binggeli	Vittorio Adorni	Franco Bitossi
Final		Vittorio Adorni	Franco Bitossi

== Final standings ==
Legend
Pink jersey	Denotes the winner of the General classification

=== General classification ===
Final general classification (1–10)
Rank	Name	Team	Time
1	Vittorio Adorni (ITA)	Salvarani	121h 08' 18"
2	Italo Zilioli (ITA)	Sanson	+ 11' 26"
3	Felice Gimondi (ITA)	Salvarani	+ 12' 57"
4	Marcello Mugnaini (ITA)	Maino	+ 14' 30"
5	Franco Balmamion (ITA)	Sanson	+ 15' 05"
6	Vito Taccone (ITA)	Salvarani	+ 15' 33"
7	Franco Bitossi (ITA)	Filotex	+ 15' 37"
8	Roberto Poggiali (ITA)	Ignis	+ 19' 22"
9	Imerio Massignan (ITA)	Ignis	+ 19' 30"
10	Guido De Rosso (ITA)	Molteni	+ 21' 03"

=== Mountains classification ===
Final mountains classification (1–10)
	Name	Team	Points
1	Franco Bitossi (ITA)	Filotex	250
2	Vito Taccone (ITA)	Salvarani	160
3	Vittorio Adorni (ITA)	Salvarani	140
4	Italo Zilioli (ITA)	Sanson	110
5	Michele Dancelli (ITA)	Molteni	90
5	Marcello Mugnaini (ITA)	Maino	90
7	Antonio Bailetti (ITA)	Sanson	30
7	Carlo Brugnami (ITA)	Molteni	30
7	Silvano Schiavon (ITA)	Legnano	30
10	Franco Cribori (ITA)	Ignis	20
10	Roberto Poggiali (ITA)	Ignis	20
10	Angelo Ottaviani (ITA)	Vittadello	20
10	Giancarlo Ferretti (ITA)	Legnano	20
10	Imerio Massignan (ITA)	Ignis	20
