= 1930 Giro di Lombardia =

Race details
- Dates: 26 October 1930
- Stages: 1
- Distance: 234 km (145 mi)
- Winning time: 7h 40' 00"

Results
	Winner	Michele Mara (ITA)
	Second	Alfredo Binda (ITA)
	Third	Learco Guerra (ITA)

The 1930 Giro di Lombardia was the 26th edition of the Giro di Lombardia cycle race and was held on 26 October 1930, over a course of 234 km (145 mi). The race started and finished in Milan. The race was won by the Italian Michele Mara, who reached the finish line at an average speed of 30.913 km/h (19.208 mph), preceding his compatriots Alfredo Binda and Learco Guerra.

124 cyclists departed from Milan and 46 of them completed the race.

== General classification ==
Final general classification

Rank	Rider	Team	Time
1	Michele Mara (ITA)	Bianchi-Pirelli	7h 40' 00"
2	Alfredo Binda (ITA)	Legnano-Pirelli	+ 0"
3	Learco Guerra (ITA)	Maino-Clement	+ 0"
4	Domenico Piemontesi (ITA)	Bianchi-Pirelli	+ 0"
5	Guglielmo Marin (ITA)		+ 0"
6	Renato Scorticati (ITA)		+ 0"
7	Alfredo Bovet (ITA)	Bianchi-Pirelli	+ 0"
=8	Augusto Zanzi (ITA)		+ 0"
=8	Antonio Negrini (ITA)		+ 0"
=8	Carlo Moretti (ITA)		+ 0"
