= Mainetti (cycling team) =

Italian cycling team (1966–1967)

Team information
- Registered: Italy
- Founded: 1966
- Disbanded: 1967
- Discipline: Road

Key personnel
- Team managers: Mario Mainetti; Marino Fontana

Team name history
- 1966–1967: Mainetti

Mainetti was an Italian professional cycling team that existed from 1966 to 1967.

The team was selected to race in two editions of the Giro d'Italia, where they achieved three stage wins.
