= 1930 Milan–San Remo =

Race details
- Dates: 30 March 1930
- Stages: 1
- Distance: 285.5 km (177.4 mi)
- Winning time: 9h 43' 00"

Results
| | Winner | Michele Mara (ITA) |
| | Second | Pio Caimmi (ITA) |
| | Third | Domenico Piemontesi (ITA) |

The 1930 Milan–San Remo was the 23rd edition of the Milan–San Remo cycle race and was held on 30 March 1930. The race started in Milan and finished in San Remo. The race was won by Michele Mara.

== General classification ==
Final general classification

| Rank | Rider | Time |
|---|---|---|
| 1 | Michele Mara (ITA) | 9h 43' 00" |
| 2 | Pio Caimmi (ITA) | + 0" |
| 3 | Domenico Piemontesi (ITA) | + 0" |
| 4 | Raffaele di Paco (ITA) | + 0" |
| 5 | Costante Girardengo (ITA) | + 0" |
| 6 | Luigi Marchisio (ITA) | + 0" |
| 7 | Luigi Giacobbe (ITA) | + 0" |
| 7 | Learco Guerra (ITA) | + 0" |
| 7 | Antonio Negrini (ITA) | + 0" |
| 7 | Riccardo Proserpio (ITA) | + 0" |
