= Cite (cycling team) =

Italian cycling team (1963–1964)

Team information
- Registered: Italy
- Founded: 1963
- Disbanded: 1964
- Discipline: Road

Key personnel
- Team manager: Michele Gismondi

Team name history
- 1963–1964: Cite

Cite was an Italian professional cycling team that existed from 1963 to 1964.

The team was selected to race in two editions of the Giro d'Italia, where they achieved two stage wins.

== Major wins ==
1963
Stage 3 Giro d'Italia, Jaime Alomar
Coppa Agostoni, Jaime Alomar
1964
Stage 9 Giro d'Italia, Pietro Zoppas
Trofeo Masferrer, Jaime Alomar
