= Libero Ferrario =

Italian cyclist

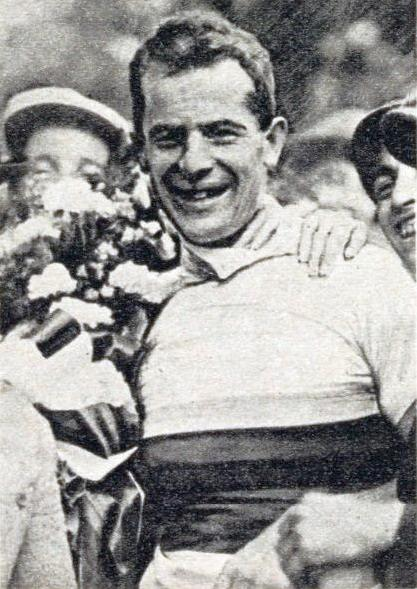
- Libero Ferrario in 1923

Personal information
- Born: 6 July 1901 Parabiago, Italy
- Died: 14 February 1930 (aged 28) Parabiago, Italy

Cycling career
- Sport: Cycling
- Discipline: Road
- Role: Rider

Libero Ferrario (6 July 1901 – 14 February 1930) was an Italian cyclist.

He died of tuberculosis at age 28.

The stadium of his hometown of Parabiago is named after him, as is the Targa Libero Ferrario, an amateur cycling race in Italy.

== Major results ==
1922
1st Coppa Bernocchi
1923
1st UCI World Amateur Road Race Championships
1st Piccolo Giro di Lombardia
1st Coppa Città di Busto Arsizio
1st Coppa Bernocchi
1924
1st Tre Valli Varesine
