= 1966 Giro di Lombardia =

Race details
- Dates: 22 October 1966
- Stages: 1
- Distance: 266 km (165 mi)
- Winning time: 6h 57' 00"

Results
	Winner	Felice Gimondi (ITA)	(Salvarani)
	Second	Eddy Merckx (BEL)	(Peugeot–Michelin–BP)
	Third	Raymond Poulidor (FRA)	(Mercier–Hutchinson–BP)

The 1966 Giro di Lombardia cycling race took place on 22 October 1966, and was won by Salvarani's Felice Gimondi. It was the 60th edition of the Giro di Lombardia "monument" classic race.

== Results ==
	Cyclist	Team	Time
1	Felice Gimondi (ITA)	Salvarani	6h 57' 00"
2	Eddy Merckx (BEL)	Peugeot–Michelin–BP	s.t.
3	Raymond Poulidor (FRA)	Mercier–Hutchinson–BP	s.t.
4	Jacques Anquetil (FRA)	Ford France–Hutchinson	s.t.
5	Michele Dancelli (ITA)	Molteni	s.t.
6	Vittorio Adorni (ITA)	Salvarani	s.t.
7	Italo Zilioli (ITA)	Sanson	+3' 40"
8	Giancarlo Polidori (ITA)	Vittadello	+5' 50"
9	Jan Janssen (NED)	Pelforth–Sauvage–Lejeune	+6' 41"
10	Aldo Pifferi (ITA)	Vittadello	s.t.
