= Domenico Meldolesi =

Italian cyclist (1940–1992)

Personal information
- Born: 12 January 1940
- Died: 3 January 1992 (aged 51)

Cycling career
- Sport: Cycling
- Discipline: Road
- Role: Rider

Professional teams
- 1962: Molteni
- 1965: Maino
- 1966: Salvarani
- 1967: Vittadello

Domenico Meldolesi (12 January 1940 – 3 January 1992) was an Italian racing cyclist. He won stage 10 of the 1965 Giro d'Italia.

== Major results ==
1965
1st Stage 10 Giro d'Italia
7th Coppa Bernocchi
7th Milano–Vignola
1966
3rd GP Cemab
1967
2nd Giro delle Tre Provincie
