= Aldo Pifferi =

Italian cyclist (1938–2023)

Personal information
- Born: 26 October 1938 Orsenigo, Italy
- Died: 29 October 2023 (aged 85) Lipomo, Italy

Cycling career
- Sport: Cycling
- Discipline: Road
- Role: Rider

Professional teams
- 1962: Atala
- 1963–1964: Lygie
- 1965–1968: Vittadello
- 1969: Ferretti
- 1970: Zonca

Aldo Pifferi (26 October 1938 – 29 October 2023) was an Italian racing cyclist. He won stage 16 of the 1965 Giro d'Italia.

== Life and career ==
Turned professional in 1962, Pifferi was initially a domestique of Vito Taccone. During his career he won several races, notably a stage of the Giro d'Italia and one of the Tirreno–Adriatico. After his retirement he ran a bike shop.

Pifferi died on 29 October 2023, at the age of 85.

== Major results ==
1961
6th Amateur road race, UCI Road World Championships
1962
6th Milano–Torino
7th Trofeo Matteotti
9th Classica Sarda
1963
4th Gran Premio Industria e Commercio di Prato
8th Coppa Agostoni
10th Coppa Sabatini
1964
3rd Giro della Provincia di Reggio Calabria
1965
1st Stage 16 Giro d'Italia
4th Milano–Vignola
7th Giro delle Tre Provincie
1966
2nd Coppa Placci
7th Trofeo Matteotti
10th Giro di Lombardia
1967
1st Giro delle Tre Provincie
1st Stage 2 Tirreno–Adriatico
7th GP Campagnolo
8th GP Cemab
1968
6th Cronostafetta
8th GP Cemab
