= Piccolo Giro di Lombardia =

Italian one-day road cycling race

Race details
- Date: October
- Region: Lombardy
- Discipline: Road race
- Competition: UCI Europe Tour
- Type: Single day race
- Web site: www.ilpiccololombardia.it

History
- First edition: 1911
- Editions: 98 (as of 2026)
- First winner: Natale Bosco (ITA)
- Most wins: No repeat winners
- Most recent: Henrique Bravo (BRA)

The Piccolo Giro di Lombardia is a one-day cycling race held annually in Lombardy, Italy. It is part of UCI Europe Tour in category 1.2U, meaning it is reserved for under 23 riders. The race acts as the U23 counterpart to the Giro di Lombardia.

== Winners ==
Year	Winner	Second	Third
1911	(Italy) Natale Bosco	(Italy) Camillo Bertarelli	(Italy) Mario Caldera
1912	(Italy) Giovanni Bassi	(Italy) Luigi Annoni	(Italy) Achille Spaggiari
1913	(Italy) Ercole Nazari	(Italy) Arnaldo Bianchi	(Italy) Romolo Verde
1914	(Italy) Gaetano Belloni	(Italy) Stefano Vigoni	(Italy) Giovanni Rossi
1915–19	No race		
1920	(Italy) Antonio Coppe	(Italy) Libero Ferrario	(Italy) Alfonso Piccin
1921	(Italy) Cesare Garino	(Italy) Luigi Magnotti	(Italy) Mario Lusiani
1922	No race		
1923	(Italy) Libero Ferrario	(Italy) Carlo Rivoltini	(Italy) Alfonso Piccin
1924	(Italy) Antonio Pancera	(Italy) Modesto Bongiovanni	(Italy) Aleardo Menegazzi
1925	(Italy) Sante Ferrato	(Italy) Pietro Cevini	(Italy) Antonio Negrini
1926	(Italy) Mario Lusiani	(Italy) Pierino Bertolazzi	(Italy) Ennio Bocchia
1927	(Italy) Ambrogio Beretta	(Italy) Luigi Calligaris	(Italy) Giovanni Vitali
1928	(Italy) Luigi Marchisio	(Italy) Ambrogio Beretta	(Italy) Ambrogio Perego
1929	No race		
1930	(Italy) Andrea Minasso	(Italy) Alfredo Carniselli	(Italy) Carlo Biassoni
1931	(Italy) Mario Grassi	(Italy) Alfredo Carniselli	(Italy) Giuseppe Graglia
1932	(Italy) Augusto Como	(Italy) Carlo Castagnoli	(Italy) Nino Sella
1933	(Italy) Carlo Castagnoli	(Italy) Carlo Rovida	(Italy) Giovanni Cazzulani
1934	(Italy) Luigi Valotti	(Italy) Angelo Zanoni	(Italy) Lino Marini
1935	(Italy) Diego Mirabelli	(Italy) Ercole Rigamonti	(Italy) Arnaldo Valsecchi
1936	(Italy) Salvatore Crippa	(Italy) Giovanni Speduzzi	(Italy) Settimio Simonini
1937	(Italy) Gino Salani	(Italy) Silvio Gosi	(Italy) Giovanni Boffo
1938	(Italy) Serafino Santambrogio	(Italy) Edgardo Scapini	(Italy) Carlo Moscardini
1939–47	No race		
1948	(Italy) Renato Cornalea	(Italy) Arnaldo Faccioli	(Italy) Bruno Molinari
1949	(Italy) Carlo Masarati	(Italy) Claudio Ricci	(Italy) Ampelio Rossi
1950	(Italy) Waldemaro Bartolozzi	(Italy) Stefano Gaggero	(Italy) Attilio Borrello
1951	(Italy) Gino Filippini	(Italy) Adelmo Casaroli	(Italy) Vasco Modena
1952	(Italy) Bruno Monti	(Italy) Mino De Rossi	(Italy) Gabriele Scappini
1953	(Italy) Aldo Moser	(Italy) Lino Ciocchetta	(Italy) Ercole Baldini
1954	(Italy) Angelo Coletto	(Italy) Giovanni Ranieri	(Italy) Cleto Maule
1955	(Italy) Diego Ronchini	(Italy) Agostino Saturnino	(Italy) Adriano Zamboni
1956	(Italy) Antonio Margotti	(Italy) Giorgio Tinazzi	(Italy) Walter Almaviva
1957	(Italy) Romeo Venturelli	(Italy) Marino Fontana	(Italy) Gianni Colombo
1958	(Italy) Ernesto Bono	(Italy) Mario Zocca	(Italy) Remo Tamagni
1959	(Italy) Luigi Zanchetta	(Italy) Marino Fontana	(Italy) Angelo Luise
1960	(Italy) Attilio Porteri	(Italy) Giuseppe Fezzardi	(Italy) Fulvio Mencaglia
1961	(Italy) Bruno Milesi	(Italy) Renato Bongioni	(Italy) Fulvio Mencaglia
1962	(Italy) Adriano Durante	(Italy) Daniele Toniolo	(Italy) Primo Nardello
1963	(Italy) Amedeo Angiulli	(Italy) Matteo Cravero	(Italy) Primo Nardello
1964	(Italy) Clay Santini	(Italy) Luciano Armani	(Italy) Matteo Cravero
1965	(Italy) Ercole Gualazzini	(Italy) Franco Plebani	(Italy) Bruno Centomo
1966	(Italy) Alberto Della Torre	(Italy) Carlo Gallazzi	(Italy) Mario Bettazzoli
1967	(Italy) Virginio Levati	(Italy) Enzo Trevisan	(Italy) Ernesto Cogliati
1968	(Italy) Angelo Corti	(Italy) Marcello Bergamo	(Italy) Tonino Giroli
1969	(Italy) Luigi Castelletti	(Italy) Enrico Camanini	(Italy) Walter Riccomi
1970	(Italy) Giuseppe Maffeis	(Italy) Elio Parise	(Italy) Mario Corti
1971	(Italy) Alfredo Chinetti	(Italy) Enrico Camanni	(Italy) Alessio Antonini
1972	(Italy) Giuliano Dominoni	(Italy) Pierino Gavazzi	(Italy) Clemente Gurnieri
1973	(New Zealand) Bruce Biddle	(Italy) Gianbattista Baronchelli	(Italy) Bruno Zanoni
1974	(Italy) Mario Gualdi	(Italy) Giuseppe Martinelli	(Italy) Leonardo Mazzantini
1975	(Italy) Gabriele Landoni	(Italy) Giuseppe Martinelli	(Italy) Roberto Ceruti
1976	(Republic of Ireland) Sean Kelly	(Italy) Vittorio Algeri	(Italy) Filippo Marchirato
1977	(Italy) Maurizio Donati	(Italy) Giovanni Fedrigo	(Italy) Alberto Tremolada
1978	(Italy) Pierangelo Bincoletto	(Italy) Fausto Stiz	(Italy) Giovanni Zola
1979	(Italy) Moreno Argentin	(Italy) Giovanni Bino	(Italy) Enzo Serpelloni
1980	(Italy) Giovanni Bino	(Italy) Emanuele Bombini	(Italy) Maurizio Piovani
1981	(Italy) Pieremilio Bergonzi	(Italy) Luigi Ferreri	(Italy) Claudio Argentin
1982	(Italy) Gianmarco Saccani	(Italy) Roberto Pagnin	(Italy) Sergio Scremin
1983	(Italy) Sergio Scremin	(Italy) Roberto Taesi	(Italy) Flavio Chesini
1984	(Italy) Walter Magnago	(Italy) Claudio Chiappucci	(Italy) Luigi Botteon
1985	(Italy) Maurizio Fondriest	(Italy) Daniele Asti	(Italy) Enrico Pezzetti
1986	(Italy) Alberto Elli	(Italy) Stefano Breme	(Norway) Morten Saether
1987	(Italy) Ettore Badolato	(Italy) Enrico Pezzetti	(Italy) Fabrizio Bontempi
1988	(Italy) Mario Manzoni	(Italy) Davide Bramati	(Italy) Maximilian Sciandri
1989	(Italy) Mirko Bruschi	(Italy) Stefano Cortinovis	(Italy) Orlando Pasinelli
1990	(Italy) Dario Nicoletti	(Italy) Davide Perona	(Italy) Stefano Faustini
1991	(Italy) Diego Pellegrini	(Soviet Union) Maksim Ratnikov	(Italy) Davide Rebellin
1992	(Italy) Andrea Peron	(Italy) Gilberto Simoni	(Russia) Vladislav Bobrik
1993	(Austria) Peter Luttenberger	(Italy) Andrea Paulan	(Italy) Stefano Checchin
1994	(Italy) Stefano Dante	(Italy) Roberto Dal Sie	(Italy) Flavio Milan
1995	(Italy) Stefano Faustini	(Italy) Maurizio Vandelli	(Italy) Lorenzo De Silvestro
1996	(Italy) Stefano Garzelli	(Italy) Davide Sacchetti	(Italy) Diego Ferrari
1997	(Italy) Cristian Auriemma	(Italy) Stefano Panetta	(Ukraine) Vladimir Duma
1998	(Italy) Leonardo Giordani	(Italy) Gianluca Tonetti	(Italy) Fabio Bulgarelli
1999	(Ukraine) Volodymyr Gustov	(United Kingdom) Jamie Burrow	(Italy) Maurizio Vandelli
2000	(Italy) Luca Barattero	(Lithuania) Marius Sabaliauskas	(Ukraine) Yaroslav Popovych
2001	(Russia) Denis Bondarenko	(Italy) Fabio Quercioli	(Italy) Luca Barattero
2002	(Italy) Antonio Quadranti	(Russia) Kiril Goloubev	(Italy) Giairo Ermeti
2003	(Italy) Sergio Ghisalberti	(Italy) Christian Murro	(Italy) Domenico Quagliarello
2004	(Italy) Giairo Ermeti	(Italy) Antonio Quadranti	(Italy) Marco Bicelli
2005	(Ukraine) Ruslan Gryschenko	(Italy) Mattia Turrina	(Russia) Alexander Efimkin
2006	No race		
2007	(Italy) Marco Frapporti	(Italy) Fabio Negri	(Italy) Alessandro Colo
2008	(Italy) Daniele Ratto	(Croatia) Hrvoje Miholjević	(France) Guillaume Bonnafond
2009	No race		
2010	(Russia) Alexander Serebryakov	(Italy) Maurizio Gorato	(Italy) Maurizio Anzalone
2011	(Italy) Cristiano Monguzzi	(France) Axel Domont	(Belarus) Kanstantin Klimiankou
2012	(Slovenia) Jan Polanc	(Italy) Davide Villella	(Italy) Enrico Barbin
2013	(Italy) Davide Villella	(Italy) Iuri Filosi	(Italy) Gianfranco Zilioli
2014	(Italy) Gianni Moscon	(Belgium) Dylan Teuns	(France) Pierre Latour
2015	(Italy) Fausto Masnada	(Italy) Giulio Ciccone	(Netherlands) Martijn Tusveld
2016	(Belgium) Harm Vanhoucke	(Italy) Andrea Vendrame	(Belgium) Bjorg Lambrecht
2017	(Belarus) Alexandr Riabushenko	(Italy) Andrea Cacciotti	(Switzerland) Gino Mäder
2018	(Australia) Robert Stannard	(Italy) Andrea Bagioli	(France) Clément Champoussin
2019	(Italy) Andrea Bagioli	(France) Clément Champoussin	(Italy) Mattia Petrucci
2020	(Australia) Harry Sweeny	(Denmark) Jacob Hindsgaul Madsen	(Eritrea) Yakob Debesay
2021	(France) Paul Lapeira	(Italy) Mattia Petrucci	(Germany) Georg Steinhauser
2022	(Belgium) Alec Segaert	(Kazakhstan) Yevgeniy Fedorov	(France) Jordan Labrosse
2023	(Belgium) William Junior Lecerf	(Republic of Ireland) Archie Ryan	(Belgium) Ramses Debruyne
2024	(France) Brieuc Rolland	(Italy) Federico Savino	(Slovenia) Gal Glivar
2025	(United Kingdom) Callum Thornley	(United Kingdom) Elliot Rowe	(France) Antoine L'Hote
2026	(Brazil) Henrique Bravo	(Denmark) Otto Schultz Jølving	(Italy) Matteo Scalco
