= Michele Mara =

Italian cyclist

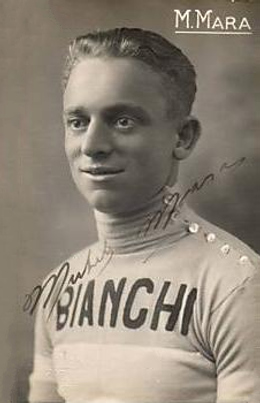

Personal information
- Full name: Michele Mara
- Born: 2 October 1903 Busto Arsizio, Italy
- Died: 18 November 1986 (aged 83) Busto Arsizio, Italy

Cycling career
- Sport: Cycling
- Discipline: Road
- Role: Rider

Professional teams
- 1928–1932: Bianchi-Pirelli
- 1933–1936: Bianchi

Major wins
- Milan–San Remo (1930), 7 stages of the Giro d'Italia (1930, 1931)

Michele Mara (2 October 1903 – 18 November 1986) was an Italian cyclist.

== Palmarès ==
1928
Coppa del Re
3rd overall Giro dell'Emilia

1930
Milan–San Remo
Giro di Lombardia
Rome-Naples-Rome
1st, 9th, 10th, 12th and 15th stages Giro d'Italia
2nd stage GP Centennial

1931
5th and 9th stages Giro d'Italia
2nd overall Giro di Lombardia
3rd overall Italian National Road Race Championships
3rd overall Tre Valli Varesine

1932
3rd overall Giro di Campania
3rd overall Milan–San Remo

1934
Trophée Colimet
