= Bianchi (cycling team) =

Italian cycling team

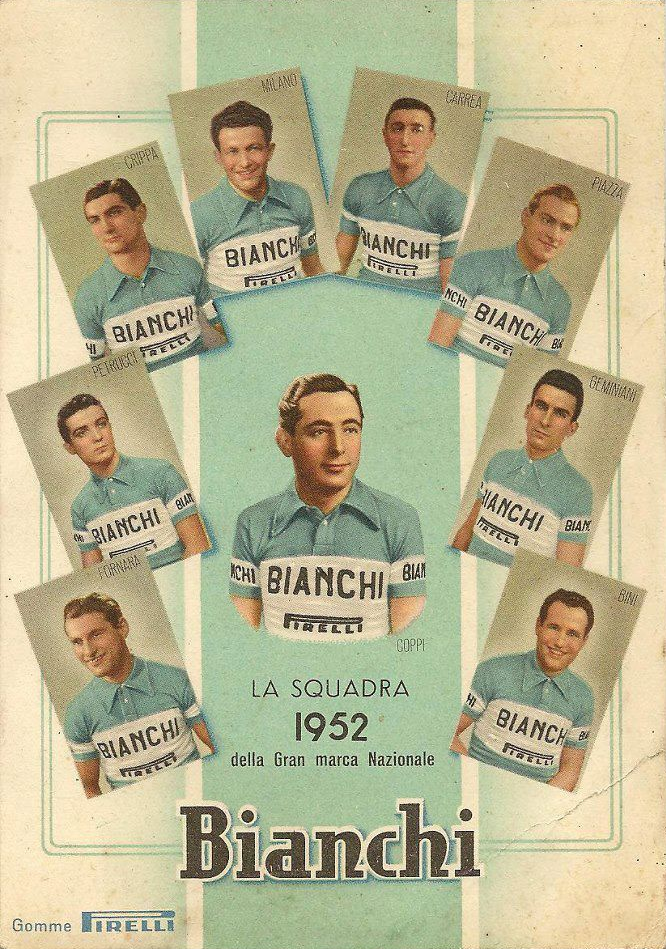
- The Bianchi team of 1952

Team information
- UCI code: BIA
- Registered: Italy
- Founded: 1899
- Disbanded: 2003
- Discipline: Road
- Status: Retired
- Bicycles: Bianchi

Team name history
- 1899–1900 1905–1908 1909 1910–1913 1914 1915–1918 1919–1920 1921 1922 1923–1926 1927–1928 1928 1929–1932 1933–1948 1949–1950 1951–1959 1960–1964 1965–1966 1973–1977 1978–1979 1980–1984 1985–1986 1987–1989 1993 2003: Bianchi; Bianchi; Bianchi–Pirelli; Bianchi; Bianchi–Dei; Bianchi; Bianchi–Pirelli; Bianchi–Dunlop; Bianchi–Salga; Bianchi; Bianchi–Pirelli; Mirandola–Bianchi–Pirelli; Bianchi–Pirelli; Bianchi; Bianchi–Ursus; Bianchi–Pirelli; Bianchi; Bianchi–Mobylette; Bianchi–Campagnolo; Bianchi–Faema; Bianchi–Piaggio; Sammontana–Bianchi; Gewiss–Bianchi; Bianchi–Freetime; Team Bianchi
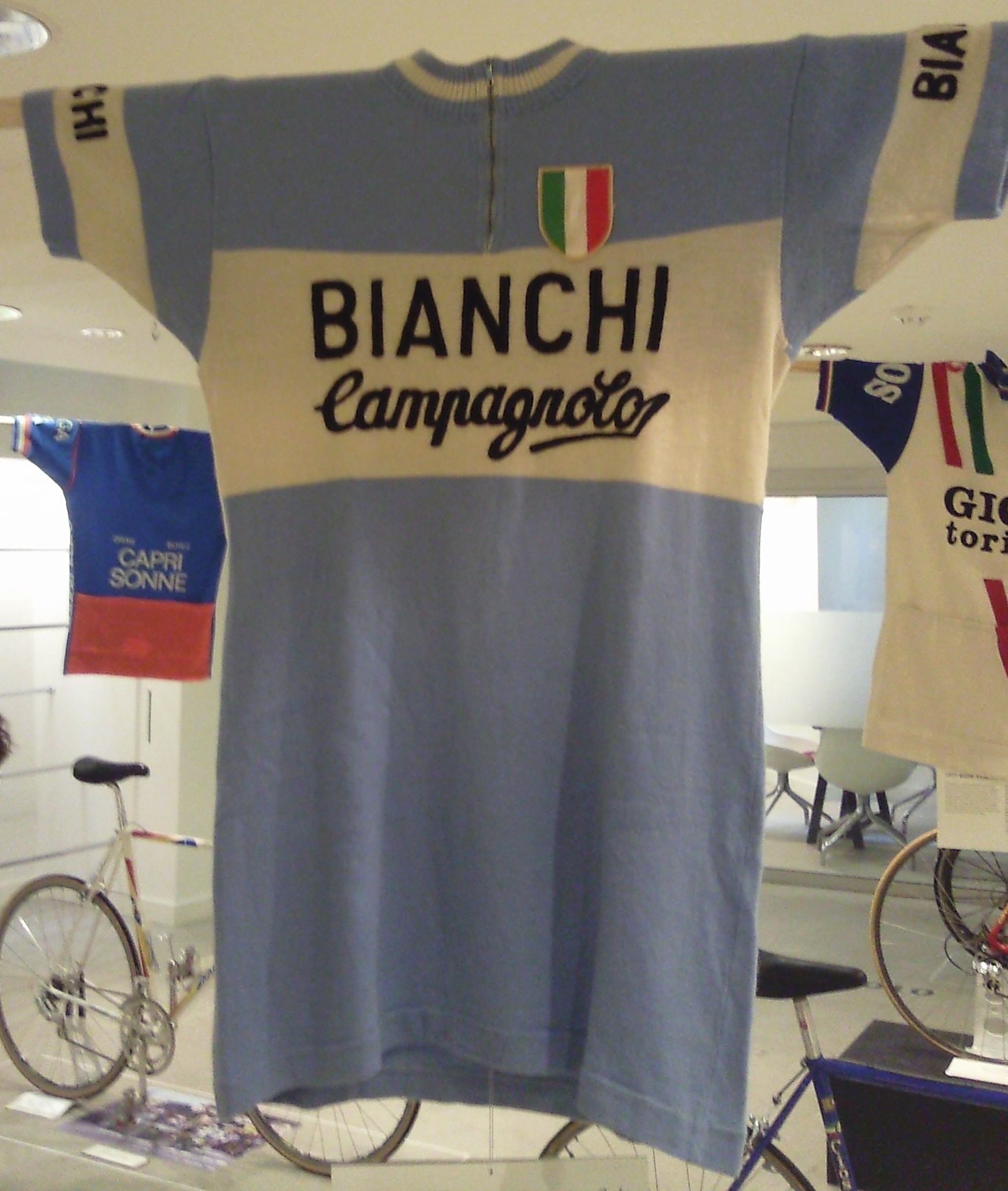
Bianchi jersey
Jersey

Bianchi was an Italian professional cycling team that was sponsored by and cycled on Bianchi Bicycles. A Bianchi cycling team existed in 1899 which implies that Bianchi was sponsoring professional cycling at a very early stage in the sport. It appears that the team existed from 1899 to 1900, then from 1905 to 1966, then from 1973 until 1984. It existed again in 1993 and for the last time in 2003, as Team Bianchi. In addition Bianchi has been a co-sponsor of many cycling teams.

Gewiss sponsored Gewiss–Bianchi from 1987 to 1989; the later Gewiss–Ballan team originated as a new project, Mecair–Ballan, in January 1993 and adopted the Gewiss name when the company replaced Mecair as title sponsor in 1994.

== History ==
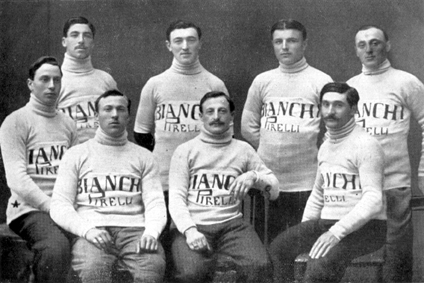
The Bianchi–Pirell team of the 1911 Giro d'Italia

In 1899 Giovanni Tommaselli won the first international cycling victory for Bianchi at the world championship of track racing: the Grand Prix of Paris. During the existence of the Bianchi team in Italy in 1919–1920, Bianchi was also a co-sponsor of a French team that was called Peugeot–Bianchi–Pirelli which according to a historical cycling website, the team rode on Peugeot bikes. It is possible that this team rode on Bianchi bikes in Italy.

The team had many famous cyclists on the team over the course of its existence. In 1945, Fausto Coppi joined the team and would stay with the team until 1956 and 1958. It has been said that the team of the mid-1940s was built around Coppi. During this time the Tour de France was disputed by national teams and Coppi won the Tour in 1949 and 1952. Coppi won the Giro d'Italia for the team in 1947, 1949, 1952 and 1953. Coppi became the first cyclist in history to achieve the Giro-Tour double. For which it was suggested at the time that he was the greatest cyclist ever seen. During this time, the directeur sportifs were Giovanni Tragella and Franco Aguggini.

In the seventies, Bianchi returned as main sponsor to the peloton in the Bianchi–Campagnolo team that contained the 1972 and 1973 world champions Marino Basso and Felice Gimondi. This team was the continuation of the Salvarani team that Gimondi had started his career with and which, in 1972, was directed by 1965 Giro d'Italia champion and 1968 World Champion Vittorio Adorni who had retired from professional racing just two years previously. Adorni directed the Bianchi–Campagnolo team with Giancarlo Ferretti in 1973. Ferretti took over as the main directeur sportif of the team the following year. This team also included the four-time winner of the Vuelta a Colombia Martin Emilio Rodriguez who won stages in the Giro d'Italia.

Finally Team Bianchi was main sponsor when German Jan Ullrich challenged American Lance Armstrong in the Centenary edition of the Tour de France. (Note: This team is dealt with in more detail in separate article, Team Bianchi.)

After the cycling season of 2003 ended, Bianchi became co-sponsor of the Alessio–Bianchi team and again they were a co-sponsor of the Liquigas-Bianchi team for the 2005 season. In 2005 Bianchi also became the co-sponsor of the Norwegian cycling team Team Maxbo Bianchi, a continental cycling team, with whom they co-sponsored until the end of the 2010 season. In October 2011, it was announced that Bianchi would be the bike sponsor of the Vancansoleil-DCM team on a two-year contract from 2012 Since 2014, Bianchi is the supplier of Belkin Pro Cycling.

Bianchi became involved in sponsorship in Mountain biking in the early nineties. Bruno Zanchi won the first World Championship for Bianchi in 1991 in the downhill speciality. Two years later, Dario Acquaroli became World Champion in cross country for Bianchi. From 2000 to 2006, the Bianchi MTB (Bianchi-Motorex and Bianchi-Agos) team dominated the sport with José Antonio Hermida and multiple World Champion Julien Absalon. In 2007 the team was renamed Gewiss–Bianchi.

== Major results ==
Major results

1899
No recorded wins

1900
No recorded wins

1905
Milano–Torino, Giovanni Rossignoli

1906
Coppa Val d'Olona, Luigi Ganna
Milano–Modena, Anteo Carapezzi
Giro di Lombardia, Cesare Brambilla

1907
Giro del Piemonte, Giovanni Gerbi
Gran Fondo La Seicento, Giovanni Gerbi
Coppa Val d'Olona, Giovanni Rossignoli
Coppa Savona, Giovanni Gerbi
Milano–Firenze, Giovanni Gerbi
Roma–Napoli–Roma, Giovanni Gerbi

1908
Coppa Savona, Giovanni Cuniolo
Tre Coppe Parabiago, Clemente Canepari
Italy National Road Race Championship, Giovanni Cuniolo
Milano–Modena, Giovanni Cuniolo

1909
Stages 1 & 8 Giro d'Italia, Dario Beni
Stages 3 & 6 Giro d'Italia, Giovanni Rossignoli
Corsa Audax Roma, Dario Beni
Giro di Liguria, Piero Lampaggi
Coppa Val d'Olona, Mario Bruschera
Overall Roma–Napoli–Roma, Giovanni Gerbi
Italy National Road Race Championship, Dario Beni

1910
Giro del Piemonte, Vincenzo Borgarello
Coppa Bastogi: Giovanni Cuniolo
Stages 3 & 5 Ai mari ai laghi ai monti, Mario Bruschera
Overall Roma–Napoli–Roma, Mario Bruschera

Stages 1 & 2, Mario Bruschera

Giro degl'Alpi Orobie, Giovanni Cuniolo
Giro Colli Laziali, Dario Beni

1911
Giro del Piemonte, Mario Bruschera
Overall Giro d'Italia, Carlo Galetti

Stages 1, 4 & 10, Carlo Galetti
Stage 3, Giovanni Rossignoli
Stage 7, Dario Beni

Tre Coppe Parabiago, Carlo Galetti
Stage 3 Torino–Firenze–Roma, Dario Beni
Overall Roma–Napoli–Roma, Dario Beni

Stage 2, Dario Beni

Italy National Road Race Championship, Dario Beni

1912
Roma–Frosinone–Anzio–Roma, Gino Brizzi
Giro della Romagna, Dario Beni
Overall Giro di Campania, Gino Brizzi

Stages 1 & 2, Gino Brizzi

Overall Giro d'Italia, Giovanni Micheletto & Eberardo Pavesi

Stages 1 & 8, Giovanni Micheletto

La Spezia–Salsomaggiore–La Spezia, Giuseppe Santhia
Roma–Napoli–Roma, Dario Beni

1913
No recorded wins

1914
Milan–San Remo, Ugo Agostoni
Stage 4 Giro d'Italia, Giuseppe Azzini
Giro della Romagna, Giovanni Cervi
Giro di Lombardia, Lauro Bordin

1915
Milano–Torino, Costante Girardengo

1916
No recorded wins

1917
Milan–San Remo, Gaetano Belloni
Stage 1 Giro della Provincia Milano, Gaetano Belloni
Milano–Torino, Oscar Egg
Giro dell'Emilia, Angelo Gremo
Milano–Modena, Oscar Egg

1918
Milan–San Remo, Costante Girardengo
Giro dell'Emilia, Costante Girardengo
Stage 1 Milano–Bologna–Roma, Marcel Godivier
Milano–Torino, Gaetano Belloni
Milano–Modena, Gaetano Belloni
Giro di Lombardia, Gaetano Belloni
GP Chiusura, Lauro Bordin

1919
Stage 1 Circuit des Champs de Bataille, Oscar Egg
Stage 5 Circuit des Champs de Bataille, Jean Alavoine
Stage 3 Giro d'Italia, Oscar Egg
Stage 5 Giro d'Italia, Gaetano Belloni
Stages 4, 5, 7, 8 & 15 Tour de France, Jean Alavoine
Stages 12 & 13 Tour de France, Luigi-Natale Lucotti
GP Sporting, Jean Alavoine

1920
Six Days of Brussels, Marcel Buysse
Milan–San Remo : Gaetano Belloni
Nice–Mont Agel : Henri Pélissier
GP de la Loire : Henri Pélissier
France National Road Race Championships, Jean Alavoine
Stage 1 Giro della Provincia Milano : Gaetano Belloni & Giuseppe Azzini
Overall Giro d'Italia, Gaetano Belloni

Stage 1, Giuseppe Oliveri
Stages 2, 3 & 7, Gaetano Belloni
Stage 4 & 6, Jean Alavoine
Stage 8, Ugo Agostoni

Overall Tour du Sud-Est, Francis Pélissier

Stages 1, 3 & 4, Francis Pélissier

Paris–Brussels, Henri Pélissier
Stages 3 & 4 Tour de France, Henri Pélissier
GP Sporting, Henri Pélissier & Francis Pélissier
Circuit des Champs de Bataille, Henri Pélissier
Giro di Lombardia, Henri Pélissier

1921
No recorded wins

1922
GP de La Bordeta, Pedro Escrich

1923
No recorded wins

1924
Coppa Cavacciocchi, Nello Ciaccheri
Milan–Modena, Nello Ciaccheri

1925
No recorded wins

1926
No recorded wins

1927
Stage 4 Giro d'Italia, Domenico Piemontesi
Stage 11 Giro d'Italia, Arturo Bresciani
Giro dell'Emilia, Domenico Piemontesi
Milano–Modena, Domenico Piemontesi

1928
Stages 1, 6, 7, 9 & 12 Giro d'Italia, Domenico Piemontesi
Groβer Sachsenpreis, Domenico Piemontesi
UCI Amateur Road World Championships, Allegro Grandi
Giro dell'Emilia, Alfonso Piccin
Stage 4 Volta a Catalunya, Carlo Porzio
Circuit de Champagne, Aimé Dossche
Hekelgem Criterium, Aimé Dossche

1929
Six days of Chicago, Gaetano Belloni
Stage 1 Giro d'Italia, Gaetano Belloni
Stage 12 Giro d'Italia, Domenico Piemontesi
Giro dell'Emilia, Allegro Grandi
Roma–Napoli–Roma, Gaetano Belloni

1930
Six days of New York City, Gaetano Belloni
Milan–San Remo, Michele Mara
Stages 1, 9, 10, 12 & 15 Giro d'Italia, Michele Mara
Stage 5 Giro d'Italia, Domenico Piemontesi
Stage 6 Giro d'Italia, Allegro Grandi
Overall Torino–Brussels, Allegro Grandi

Stage 1, Allegro Grandi
Stage 2, Michele Mara

Overall Roma–Napoli–Roma, Michele Mara

Stages 1 & 2, Michele Mara

Giro di Lombardia, Michele Mara

1931
Stages 5 & 9 Giro d'Italia, Michele Mara
Stage 12 Giro d'Italia, Ambrogio Morelli

1932
Milan–San Remo, Alfredo Bovet
Circuito Castelli Romani, Michele Mara
Overall Barcelona–Madrid, Luigi Marchisio

Stage 4, Luigi Marchisio

1933
Stages 4 & 12 Giro d'Italia, Giuseppe Olmo
Overall Volta a Catalunya, Alfredo Bovet

Stages 3 & 9, Alfredo Bovet
Stage 5, Ambrogio Morelli

Tre Valli Varesine, Alfredo Bovet
Pistoia–Prunetta, Remo Bertoni

1934
Nice–Mont Agel, Luigi Barral
Stages 13, 16 & 17 Giro d'Italia, Giuseppe Olmo
Piacenza Criterium, Pietro Rimoldi
Brasschaat Criterium, Raffaele Di Paco
Coppa Bernocchi, Pietro Rimoldi

1935
Milan–San Remo, Giuseppe Olmo
Stages 5a, 12, 15 & 16 Giro d'Italia, Giuseppe Olmo
Marina di Massa, Giuseppe Olmo
GP Cinquantenario, Giuseppe Olmo
Poperinge Criterium, Jef Demuysere
Coppa Collecchio, Pietro Rimoldi
World hour record, Giuseppe Olmo

1936
Ferrara Criterium, Giuseppe Olmo
Giro dell'Emilia, Giuseppe Olmo
Stages 1, 5, 6, 11, 12, 13, 15b, 16, 17a & 19 Giro d'Italia, Giuseppe Olmo
Stage 2 Giro d'Italia, Aldo Bini
Giro del Piemonte, Aldo Bini
Italy National Road Race Championship, Giuseppe Olmo

1937
Milano–Torino, Giuseppe Martano
Stages 3 & 4b Paris–Nice, Giuseppe Martano
Stage 6 Giro d'Italia, Giuseppe Olmo
Stages 13, 14 & 19 Giro d'Italia, Aldo Bini
Giro di Lombardia, Aldo Bini

1938
Milan–San Remo, Giuseppe Olmo
Overall Giro di Campania, Giuseppe Olmo

Stage 1, Giuseppe Olmo
Stage 2, Adolfo Leoni

Stage 4b Giro d'Italia, Walter Generati
Stage 6 Giro d'Italia, Adolfo Leoni
Stage 16 Giro d'Italia, Diego Marabelli
Torino–Ceriale, Giuseppe Olmo

1939
Stage 1 Giro d'Italia, Vasco Bergamaschi
Stage 7 Giro d'Italia, Adolfo Leoni
Stage 8 Giro d'Italia, Diego Marabelli
Giro del Veneto, Adolfo Leoni

1940
Overall GP Leptis-Magna, Adolfo Leoni

Stage 1, Adolfo Leoni

Bologna–Passo della Raticosa, Vito Ortelli
Giro del Piemonte, Cino Cinelli
Stages 1, 8, 10 & 13 Giro d'Italia, Olimpio Bizzi
Stages 4, 5, 12 & 20 Giro d'Italia, Adolfo Leoni
Stages 15 & 16 Giro d'Italia, Mario Vicini
Tre Valli Varesine, Cino Cinelli
Giro dell'Emilia, Osvaldo Bailo

1941
Giro della Toscana, Fausto Coppi
Giro del Veneto, Fausto Coppi
Italy National Road Race Championship, Adolfo Leoni
Giro del Piemonte, Aldo Bini
Gran Fondo, La Seicento, Aldo Bini
Giro dell'Emilia, Fausto Coppi
Gorizia–Ljubljana–Trieste–Gorizia, Olimpio Bizzi
Trento–Monte Bondone, Giovanni De Stefanis
Tre Valli Varesine, Fausto Coppi

1942
Milan–San Remo, Adolfo Leoni
Giro della Toscana, Vito Ortelli
Giro dell'Emilia, Adolfo Leoni
Italy National Road Race Championship, Fausto Coppi
Trento–Monte Bondone, Giovanni De Stefanis
Giro del Piemonte, Fiorenzo Magni
Giro di Lombardia, Aldo Bini
World hour record, Fausto Coppi

1943
Milan–San Remo, Cino Cinelli
Giro della Toscana, Olimpio Bizzi

1944
No recorded wins

1945
Tre Valli Varesine, Adolfo Leoni

1946
Milan–San Remo, Fausto Coppi
Giro della Romagna, Fausto Coppi
Stage 3 Giro d'Italia, Adolfo Leoni
Stage 4b, 13 & 14 Giro d'Italia, Fausto Coppi
Stage 9 Giro d'Italia, Aldo Baito
Stage 1 Monaco–Paris, Aldo Baito
Stages 4 & 5 Monaco–Paris, Adolfo Leoni
Grand Prix des Nations, Fausto Coppi
Giro dell'Emilia, Adolfo Leoni
Coppa Ugo Agostoni, Luigi Casola
Giro di Lombardia, Fausto Coppi

1947
Giro della Romagna, Fausto Coppi
Overall Giro d'Italia, Fausto Coppi

Stages 4, 8 & 16, Fausto Coppi
Stages 14, 17 & 19, Adolfo Leoni

Stage 5b Tour de Suisse, Fausto Coppi
Giro del Veneto, Fausto Coppi
Italy National Road Race Championship, Fausto Coppi
Grand Prix des Nations, Fausto Coppi
À travers Lausanne, Fausto Coppi
Giro dell'Emilia, Fausto Coppi
Giro di Lombardia, Fausto Coppi

1948
Milan–San Remo, Fausto Coppi
Mountains classification Giro d'Italia, Fausto Coppi

Stage 11, Désiré Keteleer
Stages 12 & 14, Oreste Conte
Stage 13, Bruno Pasquini
Stages 16 & 17, Fausto Coppi

Roubaix–Huy, Désiré Keteleer
Circuit des régions frontalières Mouscron, Désiré Keteleer
Tre Valli Varesine, Fausto Coppi
Giro dell'Emilia, Fausto Coppi
Giro di Lombardia, Fausto Coppi

1949
No recorded wins

1950
No recorded wins

1951
Stage 2b Roma–Napoli–Roma, Loretto Petrucci
Stages 6 & 18 Giro d'Italia, Fausto Coppi
Giro della Toscana, Loretto Petrucci
Stage 20 Tour de France, Fausto Coppi
Stage 7 Tour of Belgium, Donato Piazza
Brasschaat Criterium, Fausto Coppi
GP de Lugano, Fausto Coppi

1952
Milano–Torino, Aldo Bini
Milan–San Remo : Loretto Petrucci
Stage 2 Tour de Romandie : Andrea Carrea
Overall Tour du Maroc, Franco Giacchero

Stages 2, 5 & 6, Donato Piazza

Overall Giro d'Italia, Fausto Coppi

Mountains classification, Raphaël Géminiani
Stage 4, Désiré Keteleer
Stages 5, 11 & 14, Fausto Coppi
Stage 18, Pasquale Fornara

Overall Tour de Suisse, Pasquale Fornara

Stage 1, Désiré Keteleer
Stages 5 & 7, Pasquale Fornara

Olympic Games Track Championships (Team Pursuit), Mino De Rossi
Overall Tour de France, Fausto Coppi

Mountains classification, Fausto Coppi
Stages 7, 10, 11, 18 & 21, Fausto Coppi
Stages 8 & 17, Raphaël Géminiani

Herve, Andrea Carrea
GP Lugano, Fausto Coppi
Overall GP Mediterraneo, Fausto Coppi

Stages 1 & 6b, Fausto Coppi

1953
Milan–San Remo, Loretto Petrucci
Belmonte Piceno, Michele Gismondi
Paris–Brussels, Loretto Petrucci
Overall Giro d'Italia, Fausto Coppi

Stages 4, 19 & 20, Fausto Coppi
Stages 5, Ettore Milano
Stage 11 (TTT)

Stage 3 Critérium du Dauphiné, Raphaël Géminiani
France National Road Race Championships, Raphaël Géminiani
Moulins-Engilbert, Raphaël Géminiani
Hanret Criterium, Loretto Petrucci
Overpelt Criterium, Jozef Schils
Wezembeek-Oppem, Désiré Keteleer
Vilvoorde, Jozef Schils
GP du Brabant Wallon, Jozef Schils
GP Beeckman-De Caluwé – Ninove Individueel, Jozef Schils
Londerzeel, Jozef Schils
UCI Amateurs Road World Championships, Riccardo Filippi
UCI Road World Championships, Fausto Coppi
Nielse Pijl, Jozef Schils
Circuit Hesbaye – Condroz, Jozef Schils
Paris–Tours, Jozef Schils
Nationale Sluitingsprijs, Jozef Schils
Desgrange-Colombo, Loretto Petrucci
Trofeo Baracchi, Riccardo Filippi & Fausto Coppi

1954
Stage 3 Paris–Nice, Fausto Coppi
Ronde van Haspengouw, Jozef Schils
Stage 2b Driedaagse van Antwerpen, Wout Wagtmans
Stage 3a Driedaagse van Antwerpen, Rik Van Looy
Vijfbergenomloop, Jan De Valck
Grand Prix Printanier, Jozef Schils
Stage 4a Roma–Napoli–Roma, Fausto Coppi
Stage 1 Euskal Bizikleta, Wout Wagtmans
Lauwe, Rik Van Looy
Ronde van Brabant, Jan De Valck
Brussels–Couvin, Jozef Schils
GP Stad Antwerpen, Rik Van Looy
Brussels–Bost, Jozef Schils
Mountains classification Giro d'Italia, Fausto Coppi

Stages 1 & 20, Fausto Coppi
Stages 13 & 19, Wout Wagtmans

Omloop van het Westen, Jan De Valck
Sint-Niklaas, Criterium, Jan De Valck
Oplinter Criterium, Jozef Schils
Stage 1 Tour de France, Wout Wagtmans
Baasrode Criterium, Jan De Valck
Vilvoorde, Jan De Valck
Roubaix–Huy, Rik Van Looy
Giro di Campania, Fausto Coppi
Stages 2 & 4 Tour de Suisse, Fausto Coppi
Drie Zustersteden, Jozef Schils
GP Lucien Van Impe : Désiré Keteleer
Riemst Criterium, Jozef Schils
Coppa Bernocchi, Fausto Coppi
Giro di Lombardia, Fausto Coppi
Trofeo Baracchi, Fausto Coppi
Trofeo Baracchi, Riccardo Filippi

1955
Giro di Campania, Fausto Coppi
Stages 4 & 5a Roma–Napoli–Roma, Michele Gismondi
Stage 5b Roma–Napoli–Roma, Fausto Coppi
Stage 20 Giro d'Italia, Fausto Coppi
Houdeng-Goegnies, Fausto Coppi
Giro dell'Appennino, Fausto Coppi
Italy National Road Race Championship, Fausto Coppi
Tre Valli Varesine, Fausto Coppi
Trofeo Baracchi, Fausto Coppi
Trofeo Baracchi, Riccardo Filippi
Naples, Fausto Coppi

1956
No recorded wins

1957
No recorded wins

1958
No recorded wins

1959
No recorded wins

1960
Stage 3 Giro di Sicilia, Antonio Dal Col
Giro del Veneto, Diego Ronchini
Calvisano, Tonino Domenicali
Coppa Ugo Agostoni, Pietro Chiodini
Trofeo Baracchi, Diego Ronchini

1961
Stage 6b Roma–Napoli–Roma, Antonio Bailetti
Nyon, Antonio Bailetti
Giro del Lazio, Bruno Mealli

1962
Stage 12 Giro d'Italia, Bruno Mealli
Stage 8 Volta a Catalunya, Bruno Mealli
Giro dell'Emilia, Bruno Mealli

1963
No recorded wins

1964
No recorded wins

1965
Giro del Piemonte, Romeo Venturelli
Giro della Romagna, Dino Zandegù
Stage 7 Giro d'Italia, Luciano Armani
Stage 15 Giro d'Italia, Bruno Mealli
Coppa Sabatini, Luciano Armani

1966
Trofeo Laigueglia : Antonio Bailetti
Overall Tirreno–Adriatico, Dino Zandegù

Stage 2, Dino Zandegù

Stages 10 & 12 Giro d'Italia, Dino Zandegù
GP Città di Camaiore, Bruno Mealli
Giro dell'Emilia, Carmine Preziosi

1973
Genova–Nice, Marino Basso
Stage 4b Tirreno–Adriatico, Marino Basso
Calenzano Criterium, Felice Gimondi
Stockholm Criterium, Pietro Guerra
Stage 15 Giro d'Italia, Martín Rodríguez
Stage 16 Giro d'Italia, Felice Gimondi
Stage 20 Giro d'Italia, Marino Basso
Castrocaro Terme, Felice Gimondi
Cittadella Criterium, Felice Gimondi
Zambana di Trento, Marino Basso
GP du canton d'Argovie, Marino Basso
Coppa Bernocchi, Felice Gimondi
UCI Road World Championship, Felice Gimondi
Giro del Piemonte, Felice Gimondi
Giro di Lombardia, Felice Gimondi
Colbordolo Criterium, Felice Gimondi
Trofeo Baracchi, Felice Gimondi & Martín Rodríguez

1974
Milano–San Remo, Felice Gimondi
Stage 22 Giro d'Italia, Marino Basso
Mosselkoers – Houtem – Vilvoorde Ind., Tony Houbrechts
GP Montelupo, Marino Basso
GP du canton d'Argovie, Giacinto Santambrogio
Coppa Ugo Agostoni, Felice Gimondi
Stage 1 Lausanne, Felice Gimondi

1975
Sprint classification Setmana Catalana de Ciclismo, Giacinto Santambrogio

Stage 3a, Rik Van Linden

Boxmeer Criterium, Rik Van Linden
Stage 5 Giro d'Italia, Rik Van Linden
Stage 16 Giro d'Italia, Fabrizio Fabbri
Stage 19 Giro d'Italia, Martín Rodríguez
Points classification Tour de France, Rik Van Linden

Stage 1b, Rik Van Linden
Stage 10, Felice Gimondi
Stage 19 & 21, Rik Van Linden
Stage 20, Giacinto Santambrogio

Moorslede Criterium, Felice Gimondi
Giro dell'Appennino, Fabrizio Fabbri
Overall Cronostaffetta, Martín Rodríguez, Giacinto Santambrogio & Felice Gimondi

Stage 1a, Martín Rodríguez
Stage 1b, Felice Gimondi

Stage 1 Valkenburg aan de Geul, Rik Van Linden

1976
Giro di Campania, Rik Van Linden
Boechout Criterium, Alex Van Linden
Overall Giro d'Italia, Felice Gimondi

Stages 3 & 15, Rik Van Linden

Stage 9, Fabrizio Fabbri
Stage 21, Felice Gimondi
Stage 3a Vuelta a los Valles Mineros, José Manuel Fuente
Zele, Rik Van Linden
Aalst Criterium, Rik Van Linden
Dordrecht Criterium, Rik Van Linden
Nieuwkerken-Waas Criterium, Tony Houbrechts
Paris–Brussels, Felice Gimondi
Memorial Fred De Bruyne, Rik Van Linden

1977
Stage 2a Giro d'Italia, Rik Van Linden
Sprint classification Vuelta a Aragón, Hans Hindelang
Stage 10 Giro d'Italia, Giacinto Santambrogio
Stage 8 Tour de France, Giacinto Santambrogio
Stal–Koersel, Tony Houbrechts
Valkenswaard Criterium, Rik Van Linden
2 dage ved Aarhus, Rik Van Linden
Milano–Torino, Rik Van Linden

1978
Belgium National Track Championships (Derny), Rik Van Linden
Trofeo Laigueglia, Knut Knudsen
Overall Giro d'Italia, Johan De Muynck

Stages 1, 5 & 6 Giro d'Italia, Rik Van Linden
Stage 3, Johan De Muynck

Trofeo Baracchi, Knut Knudsen

1979
Belgium National Track Championships (Derny), Rik Van Linden
Stages 3 & 5b Tour de Romandie, Knut Knudsen
Young rider classification Giro d'Italia, Silvano Contini

Stage 10, Knut Knudsen

Stage 20 Tour de France, Serge Parsani
Coppa Bernocchi, Valerio Lualdi
Giro del Piemonte, Silvano Contini

1980
Overall Cronostaffetta, Gianbattista Baronchelli, Knut Knudsen, Alf Segersäll, Claudio Torelli, Tommy Prim & Silvano Contini

Stage 1b, Knut Knudsen

Stage 1a (TTT) Paris–Nice
Stage 2 Paris–Nice, Tommy Prim
Giro dell'Appennino, Gianbattista Baronchelli
Eschborn–Frankfurt City Loop, Gianbattista Baronchelli
Stage 3 Tour de Romandie, Silvano Contini
Stage 4b Tour de Romandie, Knut Knudsen
Young rider classification Giro d'Italia, Tommy Prim

Stage 7, Silvano Contini
Stage 11, Gianbattista Baronchelli
Stage 15, Tommy Prim

Biel-Bienne–Magglingen, Ueli Sutter
Circuito degli Assi–Nanno, Gianbattista Baronchelli
GP Montelupo, Gianbattista Baronchelli
Prologue Deutschland Tour, Knut Knudsen
Coppa Sabatini, Gianbattista Baronchelli
Coppa Ugo Agostoni, Tommy Prim
Giro del Piemonte, Gianbattista Baronchelli
GP Eddy Merckx, Knut Knudsen
Giro dell'Emilia, Gianbattista Baronchelli

1981
Ronde de Montauroux, Silvano Contini
Nice–Alassio, Bruno Wolfer
Overall Cronostaffetta, Alessandro Paganessi, Tommy Prim, Gianbattista Baronchelli & Knut Knudsen

Stage 2a, Knut Knudsen

Prologue Paris–Nice, Knut Knudsen
Stage 1 Paris–Nice, Silvano Contini
Stage 5 Paris–Nice, Tommy Prim
Overall Tour de Romandie, Tommy Prim

Stage 4, Alf Segersäll

Prologue, Stages 13 & 22 Giro d'Italia, Knut Knudsen
Stage 9 Giro d'Italia, Serge Parsani
Stage 10 Giro d'Italia, Gianbattista Baronchelli
Giro dell'Appennino, Gianbattista Baronchelli
Overall Deutschland Tour, Silvano Contini
Roccastrada Criterium, Gianbattista Baronchelli

1982
Liège–Bastogne–Liège, Silvano Contini
Stage 1 Tour de Romandie, Tommy Prim
Stages 7, 14 & 18 Giro d'Italia, Silvano Contini
Giro dell'Appennino : Gianbattista Baronchelli
GP Industria & Artigianato, Gianbattista Baronchelli
Chignolo Po Criterium, Gianbattista Baronchelli
Coppa Bernocchi, Silvano Contini

1983
Omloop Het Nieuwsblad, Fons De Wolf
Stage 5b Tour de Romandie, Tommy Prim
Stage 1 (TTT) Giro d'Italia
Stage 12 Giro d'Italia, Alf Segersäll
Stage 20 Giro d'Italia, Alessandro Paganessi
Overall Postgirot Open, Tommy Prim

Stages 2 & 3, Alessandro Paganessi
Stages 6b & 8, Tommy Prim

Coppa Ugo Agostoni, Fons De Wolf
Brussels Cycling Classic, Tommy Prim
Trofeo Baracchi, Silvano Contini

1984
Milano–Torino, Paolo Rosola
Stage 12 Giro d'Italia, Paolo Rosola
Coppa Sabatini, Silvano Contini

1987
Stage 1 Vuelta a Andalucía, Moreno Argentin
Stages 2 & 4 Tirreno–Adriatico, Moreno Argentin
Liège–Bastogne–Liège, Moreno Argentin
Stage 2 Vuelta a España, Paolo Rosola
Stages 5 & 17 Vuelta a España, Roberto Pagnin
Stages 2, 4 & 7 Giro d'Italia, Moreno Argentin
Stages 8, 10 & 20 Giro d'Italia, Paolo Rosola
Stage 2 Coors Classic, Emanuele Bombini
Stages 5, 11, 12b & 15 Coors Classic, Paolo Rosola
Stage 16 Coors Classic, Moreno Argentin
Schaan Criterium, Paolo Rosola
Giro di Lombardia, Moreno Argentin

1988
Stage 1 Critérium International, Moreno Argentin
Stages 10 & 20 Giro d'Italia, Paolo Rosola
Overall Grabs–Voralp, Arno Küttel

Stage 1a, Arno Küttel

Sweden National Road Race Championships, Lars Wahlqvist
Visp–Grächen, Arno Küttel
Stage 5b Tour of Denmark, Paolo Rosola

1989
Stage 3 Vuelta a Andalucía, Paolo Rosola
GP du canton d'Argovie, Paolo Rosola
Italy National Road Race Championships, Moreno Argentin
Stage 5 GP Guillaume Tell, Davide Cassani
