= 1967 Tour de Romandie =

Race details
- Dates: 4–7 May 1967
- Stages: 4
- Distance: 768 km (477 mi)
- Winning time: 20h 31' 34"

Results
	Winner	Vittorio Adorni (ITA)
	Second	Louis Pfenninger (SUI)
	Third	Armand Desmet (BEL)

The 1967 Tour de Romandie was the 21st edition of the Tour de Romandie cycle race and was held from 4 May to 7 May 1967. The race started in Geneva and finished in Sainte-Croix. The race was won by Vittorio Adorni.

== General classification ==
Final general classification
Rank	Rider	Time
1	Vittorio Adorni (ITA)	20h 31' 34"
2	Louis Pfenninger (SUI)	+ 45"
3	Armand Desmet (BEL)	+ 48"
4	Jaime Alomar (ESP)	+ 3' 49"
5	José Manuel Lasa (ESP)	+ 5' 10"
6	Raymond Mastrotto (FRA)	+ 7' 04"
7	Mino Denti (ITA)	+ 9' 15"
8	Franco Balmamion (ITA)	+ 10' 14"
9	Roberto Ballini (ITA)	+ 14' 39"
10	Victor Van de Wiele (BEL)	+ 20' 59"
