= Bruno Mealli =

Italian cyclist (1937–2023)

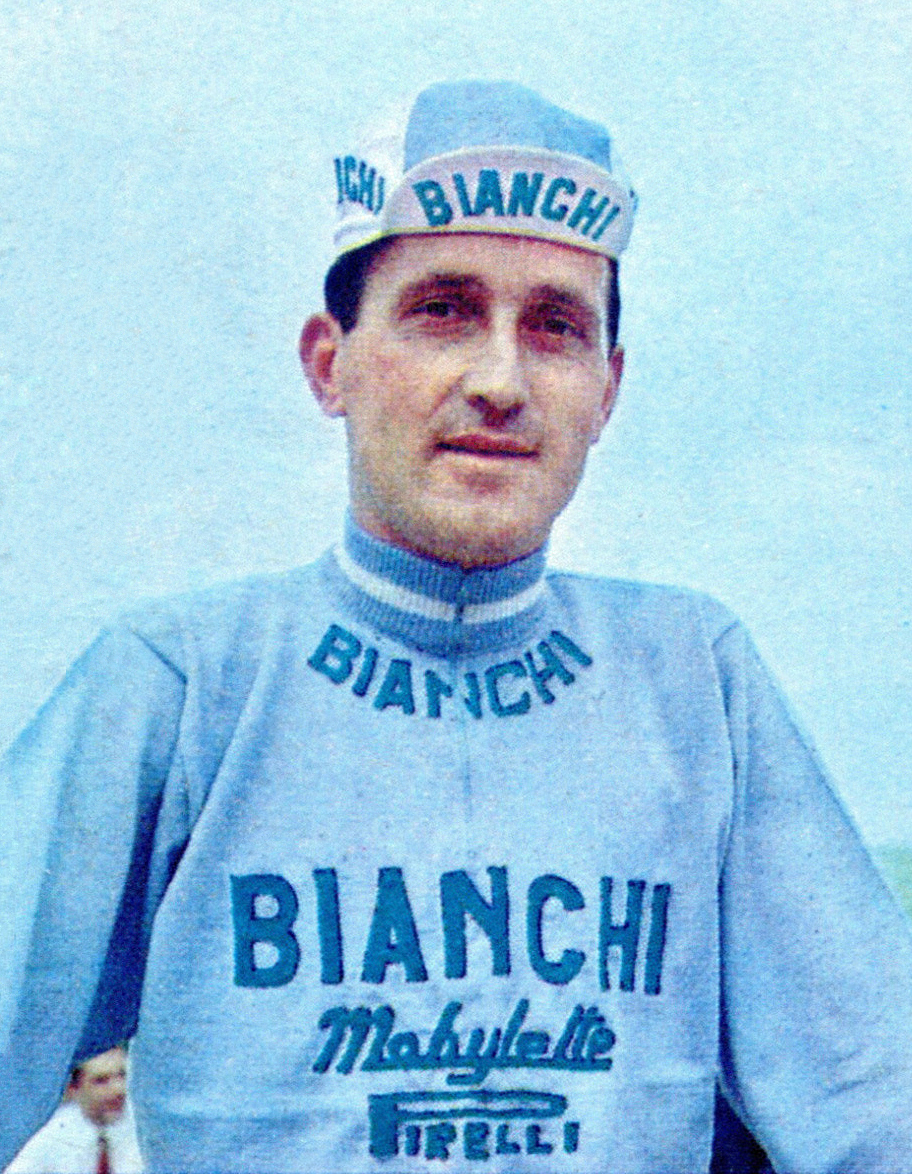
- Mealli c. 1966

Personal information
- Born: 20 November 1937 Loro Ciuffenna, Italy
- Died: 3 August 2023 (aged 85) Loro Ciuffenna

Cycling career
- Sport: Cycling
- Discipline: Road
- Role: Rider

Professional teams
- 1961: Bianchi
- 1962: Ignis–Moschettieri
- 1963: Cynar–Frejus
- 1964–1966: Bianchi
- 1967: Salamini–Luxor TV
- 1968: Faema
- 1969: Scic

Major wins
- Grand Tours Giro d'Italia 3 individual stages (1962, 1964, 1965) One-day races and Classics National Road Race Championships (1963) Giro del Lazio (1961, 1964) Gran Premio Città di Camaiore (1966) Giro dell'Emilia (1962) Giro della Romagna (1963, 1967)

Bruno Mealli (20 November 1937 – 3 August 2023) was an Italian professional road cyclist. He competed in eight editions of the Giro d'Italia.

== Career ==
When an amateur, Mealli won several races, notably the Giro del Casentino. A professional rider from 1961 to 1969, during his career he competed in eight editions of the Giro d'Italia, winning three stages and wearing the pink jersey five times. He won the Italian National title in 1963, and he was selected in the Italian team for the 1964 and 1965 UCI Road World Championships. After his retirement, he worked as a clerk and later as a manager for Poste Italiane. He died on 3 August 2023, at the age of 85.

== Major results ==
1959
1st Giro del Casentino
1960
3rd Gran Premio della Liberazione
1961
1st Giro del Lazio
2nd Giro del Veneto
1962
1st Gran Premio Industria e Commercio di Prato
1st Giro dell'Emilia
1st Stage 8 Volta a Catalunya
1st Stage 12 Giro d'Italia
2nd Trofeo Matteotti
9th Milan–San Remo
1963
1st Road race, National Road Championships
1st Giro della Romagna
2nd Coppa Sabatini
1964
1st Giro del Lazio
1st Stage 1 Tour de Luxembourg
1st Stage 18 Giro d'Italia
2nd Coppa Agostoni
1965
1st Stage 15 Giro d'Italia
1966
1st Gran Premio Città di Camaiore
1967
1st Giro della Romagna
2nd Milano–Vignola
3rd Giro della Provincia di Reggio Calabria
1968
3rd Coppa Agostoni
