= Circuit des Champs de Bataille =

Bicycle race in France, Belgium and Luxembourg

Race details
- Date: Late April/early May
- Region: Northern France, Belgium, Luxembourg
- Discipline: Road race
- Type: Stage race (1919); One-day race (1920)
- Organiser: Le Petit Journal

History
- First edition: 1919
- Editions: 2
- Final edition: 1920

The Circuit des Champs de Bataille was a multiple-stage road bicycle race held in northern France, Belgium and Luxembourg between 28 April and 11 May 1919. The race was composed of seven stages, with the first stage starting in and the last stage finishing in Strasbourg, a city in Alsace that with the end of hostilities had again become part of France. The stages took the race to Luxembourg City, Brussels, Amiens, Paris, Bar-le-Duc and Belfort. The race was approximately 2,000 kilometres (1,200 mi) long, with riders covering around 300 kilometres (190 mi) per day, with a rest day in between each stage.

The race was organised by the newspaper Le Petit Journal as a means of reinvigorating bicycle racing in the region following World War I, to honour those who died in the war and for publicity purposes for the newspaper. It was announced on 5 January 1919, less than two months after the armistice of 11 November 1918. Although Europe was in the midst of reconstruction and then at the height of the deadly flu pandemic, the Petit Journal's 8,500 franc purse, the equivalent of four years' wages for a typical working man, guaranteed that the race would attract top talent. The newspaper also organised a number of other sporting events during 1919, including a football tournament for the liberated regions, an air race, a cross-country running race, a swimming competition and a boxing match. Although 140 riders registered for the race, many could not train or muster basic equipment, leaving just 87 riders to start the race in Strasbourg, including the prominent riders Oscar Egg, Jean Alavoine, Ali Neffati (who wore a fez) and Paul Duboc, as well as future cycling champions Jules Vanhevel, Lucien Buysse and Albert Dejonghe. The race was won by the Belgian Charles Deruyter, who finished with a lead of 2 hours 25 minutes. He was reportedly so cold at the end of the third stage that he was unable to sign his name, having astonished observers at the finish line of the second stage by crossing in a full-length woman's fur coat that had been given to him by a spectator along the way.

Historian Christopher Thompson reports that of the 87 riders who started the race, only 13 successfully finished it. It has since been described as the toughest cycle race in history. World War I had reduced many of the towns and villages that the race passed through to rubble. Le Petit Journal reported on "terrible weather, broken roads, freezing wind and icy conditions". Some local newspapers had warned before the event that the roads were in such a poor condition as to be unsuitable, but the organisers argued that these conditions bestowed prestige on the race, citing military cyclists who used the same roads under machine-gun fire. Given only rudimentary directions, riders had to search through piles of rubble at various crossroads to find signage directing them to the next town; some former villages were discernable only by smears of red brick dust. As a result of shortages caused by the war, the competitors also had to deal with poor supplies of food and poor-quality tires. Newspapers including Le Petit Journal and L'Auto did not see the difficulties of the event as evidence of the state of post-war France, but rather celebrated the race's competitors as "heroic survivors" who symbolised national revival; some 67 professional French cyclists were known to have died during the conflict. Upon its completion, the event's organisers called it a "victory ... for the French race". The publication Vélo-Sport praised the Belgian participants as "géants de courage et de volonté" ("heroes of courage and willpower") who had given the public "lessons in vigour".

A race of the same name was held again in 1920, but it was organised as a one-day race rather than a stage race. This event was won by the French rider Henri Pélissier.
