= Giro del Lazio =

Italian cycle race

- 2013 logo

Race details
- Date: Early-August
- Region: Lazio, Italy
- English name: Tour of Lazio
- Local name(s): Giro del Lazio, Roma Maxima (in Italian)
- Discipline: Road
- Competition: UCI Europe Tour
- Type: Single-day
- Organiser: RCS Sport
- Web site: www.gazzetta.it/Speciali/RomaMaxima/it/

History
- First edition: 1933
- Editions: 75 (as of 2026)
- First winner: Giovanni Valetti (ITA)
- Most wins: Francesco Moser (ITA); Andrea Tafi (ITA) (3 wins)
- Most recent: Dorian Godon (FRA)

The Giro del Lazio is a semi classic European bicycle race held in the region of Lazio, Italy. From 2005 to 2008, the race was organised as a 1.HC event on the UCI Europe Tour. It is currently a 1.1 category event known as the Gran Premio del Lazio.

In past years it was also held as Giro delle Quattro Provincie, Gran premio di Roma and Gran Premio Littoria.

The Giro del Lazio returned to the race calendar in 2013 and 2014 following a hiatus since 2008 as the Roma Maxima. The race was not held between 2015 and 2025 before returning as the Gran Premio del Lazio in 2026.

== Winners ==
Year	Country	Rider	Team
1933	Italy	Giovanni Valetti	
1934	Italy	Renato Scorticati	
1935	Italy	Giuseppe Martano	Fréjus
1936	Italy	Rinaldo Gerini	Fréjus
1937	Italy	Gino Bartali	Legnano
1938	Italy	Cesare Del Cancia	Ganna
1939	Italy	Mario Vicini	Lygie
1940	No race		
1941	Italy	Adolfo Leoni	Bianchi
1942	Italy	Osvaldo Bailo	Viscontea
1943	Italy	Quirino Toccaceli	Olmo
1944	No race		
1945	Italy	Zoarino Guidi	amateur
1946	No race		
1947	Italy	Michele Motta	Lygie–Pirelli
1948	Italy	Pietro Giudici	S.C. Crennese
1949	Italy	Annibale Brasola	Bottecchia–Pirelli
1950	No race		
1951	Italy	Fiorenzo Magni	Ganna–Ursus
1952	Italy	Dante Rivola	Guerra–Ursus
1953	Italy	Giorgio Albani	Legnano–Pirelli
1954	Italy	Angelo Conterno	Fréjus
1955	Italy	Loretto Petrucci	Lygie
1956	Italy	Fiorenzo Magni	Nivea–Fuchs
1957	Italy	Ercole Baldini	Legnano
1958	Italy	Nino Defilippis	Carpano
1959	Italy	Diego Ronchini	Bianchi–Pirelli
1960	Italy	Giuseppe Fallarini	Ignis
1961	Italy	Bruno Mealli	Bianchi
1962	Italy	Nino Defilippis	Carpano
1963	Italy	Adriano Durante	Legnano
1964	Italy	Bruno Mealli	Cynar–Fréjus
1965	Italy	Franco Bitossi	Filotex
1966	Italy	Michele Dancelli	Molteni
1967	Italy	Felice Gimondi	Salvarani
1968	Italy	Giancarlo Polidori	Pepsi Cola
1969	Italy	Flaviano Vicentini	Filotex
1970	Italy	Michele Dancelli	Molteni
1971	Italy	Franco Mori	
1972	Belgium	Martin Van Den Bossche	
1973	Italy	Giovanni Battaglin	
1974	Italy	Roberto Poggiali	
1975	Belgium	Roger De Vlaeminck	
1976	Belgium	Roger De Vlaeminck	
1977	Italy	Francesco Moser	
1978	Italy	Francesco Moser	
1979	Italy	Silvano Contini	
1980	Sweden	Bernt Johansson	
1981	Italy	Gianbattista Baronchelli	
1982	Norway	Dag Erik Pedersen	
1983	Italy	Silvano Contini	
1984	Italy	Francesco Moser	
1985	Italy	Bruno Leali	
1986	Switzerland	Urs Zimmermann	
1987	Italy	Roberto Pagnin	
1988	France	Charly Mottet	
1989	France	Charly Mottet	
1990	Italy	Maurizio Fondriest	Del Tongo
1991	Italy	Andrea Tafi	Carrera Jeans–Tassoni
1992	Italy	Gianni Bugno	Gatorade–Château d'Ax
1993	Switzerland	Pascal Richard	Ariostea
1994	Italy	Maurizio Fondriest	Lampre–Panaria
1995	Switzerland	Pascal Richard	MG Maglificio–Technogym
1996	Italy	Andrea Tafi	Mapei–GB
1997	Italy	Alessandro Baronti	Asics–CGA
1998	Italy	Andrea Tafi	Mapei–Bricobi
1999	Italy	Sergio Barbero	Mercatone Uno–Bianchi
2000	Great Britain	Maximilian Sciandri	Linda McCartney Racing Team
2001	Italy	Massimo Donati	Tacconi Sport–Vini Caldirola
2002	Italy	Paolo Bettini	Mapei–Quick-Step
2003	Italy	Michele Bartoli	Fassa Bortolo
2004	Spain	Juan Antonio Flecha	Fassa Bortolo
2005	Italy	Filippo Pozzato	Quick-Step–Innergetic
2006	Italy	Giuliano Figueras	Lampre–Fondital
2007	Italy	Gabriele Bosisio	Tenax
2008	Italy	Francesco Masciarelli	Acqua & Sapone–Caffè Mokambo
2009– 2012	No race		
2013	France	Blel Kadri	Ag2r–La Mondiale
2014	Spain	Alejandro Valverde	Movistar Team
2015– 2025	No race		
2026	France	Dorian Godon	Netcompany INEOS
