= Vittorio Adorni =

Italian cyclist (1937–2022)

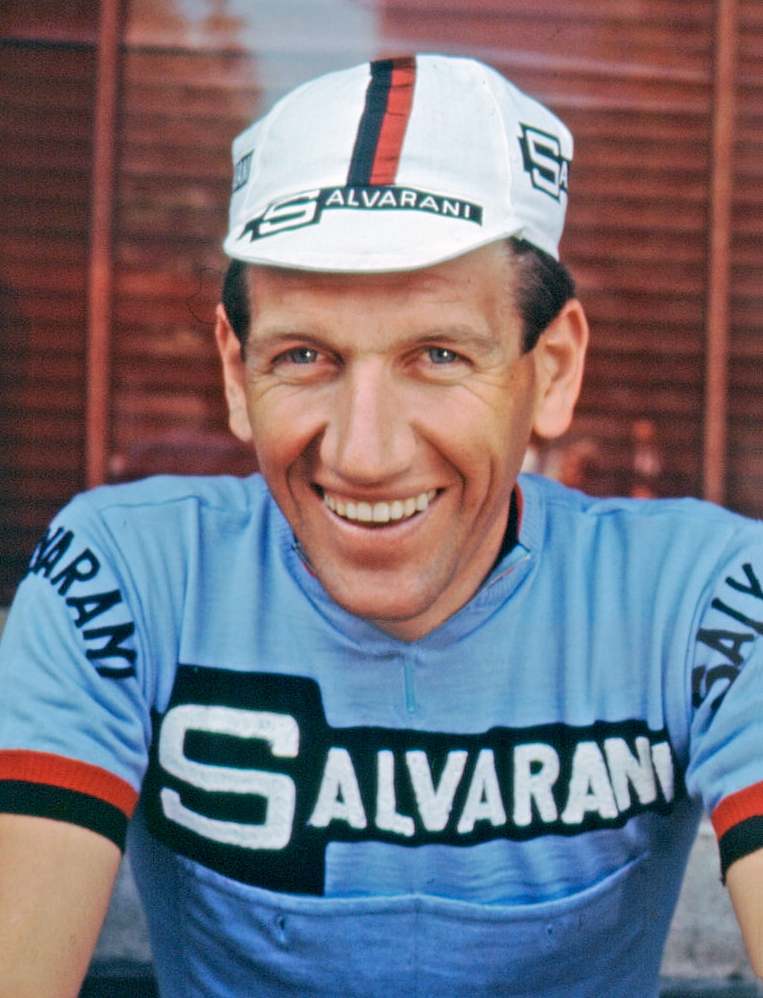
- Adorni at the 1966 Giro d'Italia

Personal information
- Full name: Vittorio Adorni
- Born: 14 November 1937 San Lazzaro di Parma, Kingdom of Italy
- Died: 24 December 2022 (aged 85) Parma, Italy

Cycling career
- Sport: Cycling
- Discipline: Road
- Role: Rider

Professional teams
- 1961: Vov
- 1962: Philco
- 1963: Cynar–Frejus
- 1964–1966: Salvarani
- 1967: Salamini–Luxor TV
- 1968: Faema
- 1969–1970: Scic

Major wins
- Grand Tours Giro d'Italia General classification (1965) 11 individual stages Stage races Tour de Romandie (1965, 1967) Tour of Belgium (1966) Tour de Suisse (1969) One-day races and Classics World Road Race Championship (1968) National Road Race Championship (1969)
Medal record
Representing Italy
Men's road bicycle racing
World Championships
| Gold medal – first place | 1968 Imola | Elite Men's Road Race |
| Silver medal – second place | 1964 Sallanches | Elite Men's Road Race |

Vittorio Adorni (14 November 1937 – 24 December 2022) was an Italian professional road racing cyclist.

== Early life and amateur career ==
Adorni was born in San Lazzaro di Parma on 14 November 1937. He was a talented amateur and showed early talent at riding alone. He began racing in 1955 and won the national amateur pursuit championship in 1959. Skill at riding fast alone won him the world professional road championship nine years later.

Adorni won the Trofeo de Gasperiin 1960 and turned professional during 1961 after winning the Coppa San Geo.

== Professional career ==
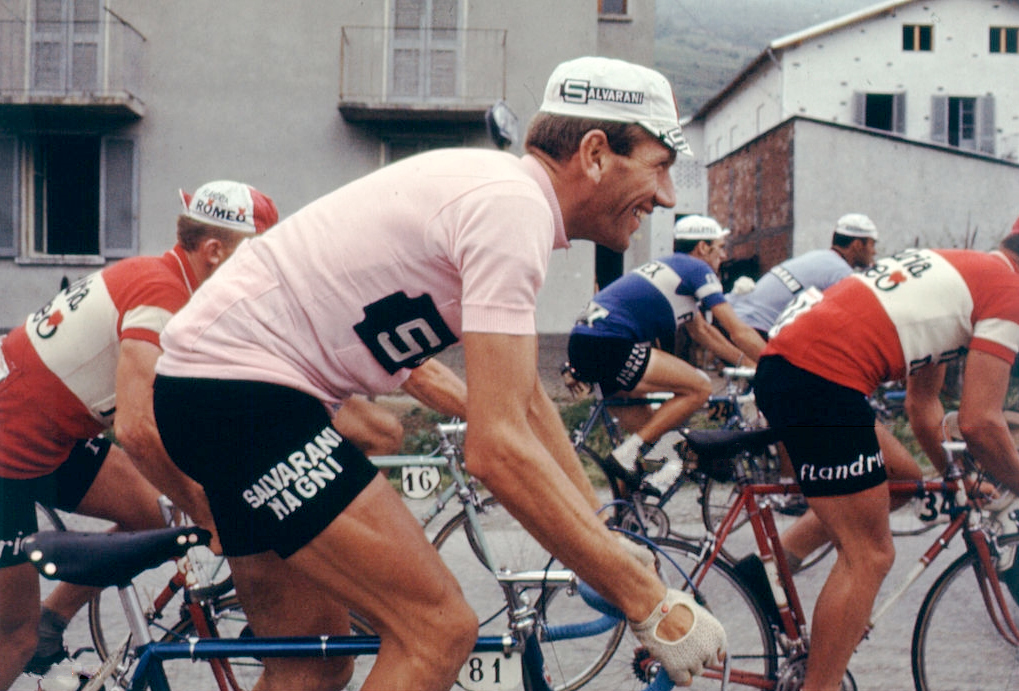
Adorni at the 1965 Giro d'Italia

Adorni won two races in his first full year as a professional in 1961, riding for Philco and winning stages of the Giro d'Italia and the Tour of Sardinia. Adorni was more a domestique than a leader but he nevertheless won the 1965 Giro and the 1968 world road race championship. The championship was on the car race circuit at Imola, Italy. He broke clear with 93 km still to ride. He finished 10 minutes ahead of the field, helped in the peloton by his Italian teammates and also by Eddy Merckx, his normal teammate, who did not take up the chase.

The Cycling Hall of Fame, an American organisation, said:

"In 1968, Adorni taught Eddy Merckx of Belgium how to properly eat and rest during a Grand Tour. Merckx used this knowledge to not only win his first grand tour, the Giro d'Italia, but also the mountains and points jerseys as well, the first time ever this was done in a grand tour. Adorni finished second to Merckx in that race."

== Retirement ==
Adorni rode as a professional from 1961 to 1970. He retired to work in insurance and then became directeur sportif of the Salvarani team until 1973. He became president of the Italian riders' association and a commentator for the television company, RAI. In 2001 he joined the management committee of the governing body, the Union Cycliste Internationale. The French magazine Vélo said: When he was nominated, no small number of observers asked 'Why him? Isn't he just Hein Verbruggen's puppet?'

The former Italian champion was chosen for his personality [était simplement victime de sa personnalité]. As a rider, he was respected. He was a gentleman. When Hein Verbruggen dug in, Adorni was a patient mediator, a natural negotiator. The crisis with the organisers of the three grands tours didn't turn into a fiasco and he was able to maintain contacts. The world body was responsible for the Pro Tour; Adorni became its conscience.

Adorni worked in skiing, in public relations for the Winter Olympics at Innsbruck in 1976. He also worked in public relations at the summer Games in Montréal in 1976. From 1996 until 2004 he was President of Panathlon International. In 2000, he was a recipient of the Silver Olympic Order.

Adorni died in Parma on 24 December 2022, at the age of 85.

== Major results ==
=== Track ===
1958
1st National Track Championship, Individual Pursuit

=== Road ===
1960
2nd Giornata della Bicicletta
1961
1st Coppa San Geo
3rd San Daniele Po
10th Giro della Romagna
10th Giro dell'Emilia
1962
1st Stage 4 Giro di Sardegna
2nd Milano–Torino
4th Giro dell'Emilia
5th Overall Giro d'Italia

1st Stage 15

5th Trofeo Baracchi
6th Grand Prix des Nations
7th Trofeo Matteotti
1963
1st Maggiora
1st Tour des Quatre-Cantons
2nd Overall Giro d'Italia

1st Stages 1 & 16
Held after Stage 18

3rd Liège–Bastogne–Liège
4th Coppa Agostoni
5th Milan–San Remo
7th Trofeo Baracchi
8th Overall Giro di Sardegna

1st Stages 5 & 6

10th Tre Valli Varesine
1964
1st Overall Giro di Sardegna
2nd Road race, UCI Road World Championships
2nd Trofeo Baracchi
2nd Antwerpen - Ougrée
3rd Liège–Bastogne–Liège
3rd Corsa Coppi
4th Overall Giro d'Italia

1st Stages 1 & 14

7th Trofeo Laigueglia
7th Coppa Placci
10th Overall Tour de France
1965
1st Overall Giro d'Italia

1st Stages 6, 13 & 19

1st Overall Tour de Romandie

1st Stages 1b & 3b

1st Trofeo Città di Borgomanero
1st GP Lugano
2nd Milan–San Remo
2nd Liège–Bastogne–Liège
5th Milano–Torino
6th Giro di Lombardia
7th Paris–Roubaix
8th Trofeo Laigueglia
8th Corsa Coppi
1966
1st Overall Tour of Belgium

1st Stage 4

1st Stage 1 Giro di Sardegna
3rd Overall Paris–Nice
6th Giro di Toscana
6th Giro dell'Emilia
7th Overall Giro d'Italia

1st Stage 13
Held after Stages 13 & 14

9th Tour of Flanders
1967
1st Overall Tour de Romandie
1st Coppa Bernocchi
2nd Giro della Provincia di Reggio Calabria
2nd Giro di Campania
2nd GP Forli
3rd Milano–Torino
4th Overall Giro d'Italia

1st Stage 20

5th Overall Giro di Sardegna
5th Liège–Bastogne–Liège
8th Overall Tirreno–Adriatico
10th Milano–Vignola
1968
1st Road race UCI Road World Championships
1st Stage 1 Tirreno–Adriatico
2nd Overall Giro d'Italia
3rd GP Forli
5th Overall Vuelta a España
5th Trofeo Laigueglia
8th Overall À travers Lausanne
1969
1st National Road Race Championship
1st Overall Tour de Suisse

1st Stages 5 & 9

1st Stage 22 Giro d'Italia
1st Giro della Provincia di Reggio Calabria
1st GP Alghero
1st Stage 5b Tirreno–Adriatico
2nd Overall Tour de Romandie

1st Stages 2 & 3b

1970
1st Stage 3 Tour de Romandie
4th Overall Tirreno–Adriatico
10th Overall Giro d'Italia

=== Grand Tour general classification results timeline ===
| Grand Tour | 1961 | 1962 | 1963 | 1964 | 1965 | 1966 | 1967 | 1968 | 1969 | 1970 |
|---|---|---|---|---|---|---|---|---|---|---|
| Vuelta a España | — | — | — | — | — | — | — | 5 | — | — |
| Giro d'Italia | 28 | 5 | 2 | 4 | 1 | 7 | 4 | 2 | 12 | 10 |
| Tour de France | — | DNF | — | 10 | DNF | — | — | — | — | — |

Legend
| — | Did not compete |
| DNF | Did not finish |

== Honour ==
- Italy: Knight Grand Cross of the Order of Merit of the Italian Republic (27 December 2012)
