= Luciano Galbo =

Italian cyclist

Personal information
- Born: 12 April 1943
- Died: 23 September 2011 (aged 68)

Cycling career
- Sport: Cycling
- Role: Rider

Luciano Galbo (12 April 1943 – 23 September 2011) was an Italian racing cyclist. He won stage 3 of the 1965 Giro d'Italia.
