= Maino (cycling team, 1965) =

Italian cycling team

Team information
- Registered: Italy
- Founded: 1965
- Disbanded: 1965
- Discipline: Road
- Bicycles: Maino

Key personnel
- Team manager: Alfredo Sivocci

Team name history
- 1965: Maino

Maino was an Italian professional cycling team that existed only in 1965. The team was led by Alfredo Sivocci, who was a professional cyclist in the 1920s.

Riders of the team won four stages of the 1965 Giro d'Italia, including one by Domenico Meldolesi and Danilo Grassi and two by, Raffaele Marcoli. It was sponsored by Italian bicycle and motorcycle manufacturer Maino.
