= Willi Altig =

German cyclist (born 1935)

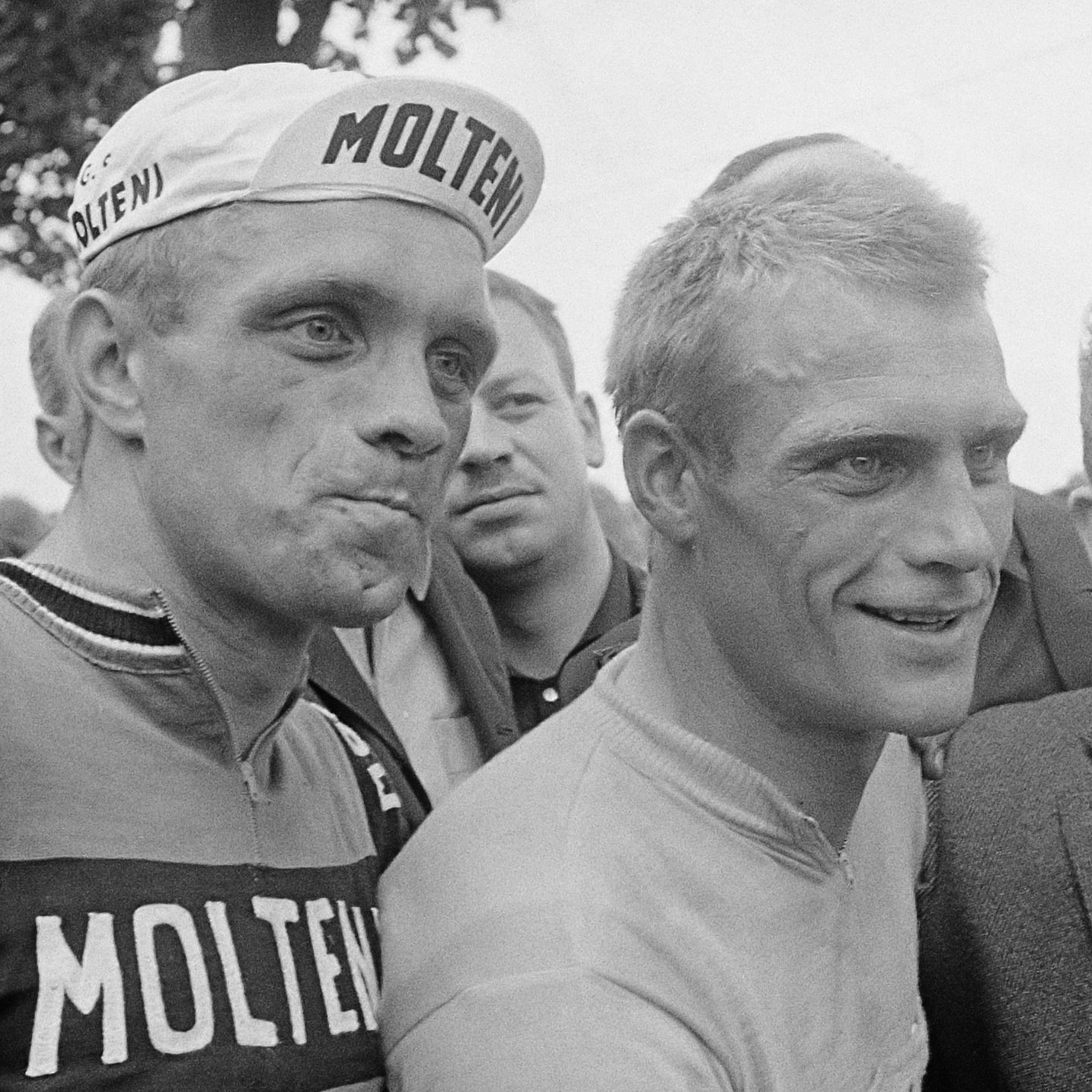
- Willi and Rudi Altig (1966)

Personal information
- Born: 17 January 1935 (age 91) Mannheim, Germany

Cycling career
- Sport: Cycling
- Role: Rider

Willi Altig (born 17 January 1935) is a German former professional racing cyclist. He rode in the 1960 and 1966 Tour de France. He is the older brother of cyclist Rudi Altig.
