= Danilo Grassi =

Italian cyclist

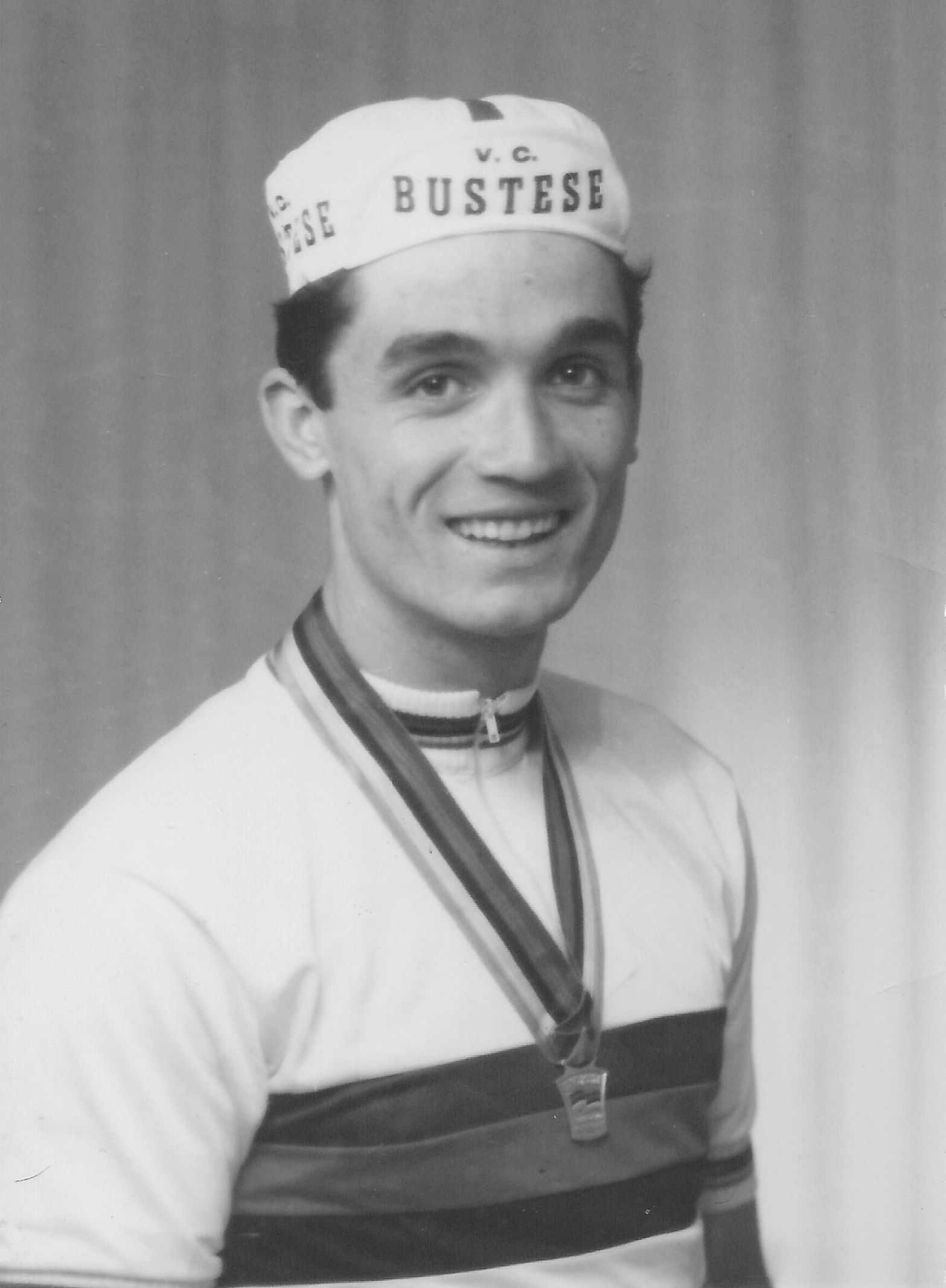

Personal information
- Born: 1 January 1941 (age 85) Lonate Pozzolo, Italy

Cycling career
- Sport: Cycling
- Current team: Retired
- Discipline: Road
- Role: Rider

Professional teams
- 1963: Legnano
- 1964: Lygie
- 1965: Maino

Danilo Grassi (born 1 January 1941) is an Italian racing cyclist. He won stage 14 of the 1965 Giro d'Italia.

== Major results ==
1962
1st World Team Time Trial Championships (with Mario Maino, Dino Zandegù and Antonio Tagliani)
1963
1st National Team Time Trial Championships (with Mario Maino, Dino Zandegù and Fabrizio Fabbri)
1st Time trial, Mediterranean Games (with Mario Maino, Dino Zandegù and Fabrizio Fabbri)
2nd World Team Time Trial Championships
1965
1st Stage 14 Giro d'Italia
