= Raffaele Marcoli =

Italian cyclist (1940–1966)

Personal information
- Born: 27 March 1940 Turbigo, Italy
- Died: 29 August 1966 (aged 26) Feriolo, Italy

Cycling career
- Sport: Cycling
- Role: Rider
- Rider type: Sprinting

Professional teams
- 1963–1964: Legano
- 1965: Maino
- 1966: Sanson

Major wins
- 1 semi-classic Coppa Bernocchi; 4th stages (Giro d'Italia)

Raffaele Marcoli (27 March 1940 in Turbigo, Italy– 29 August 1966 in Feriolo, Italy) was an Italian professional road bicycle racer. He won 4 stages at the Giro d'Italia in 1963, 1964, 1965 and 1966. He also won the semi-classic race Coppa Bernocchi and Tirreno–Adriatico. He died with his girlfriend in a traffic collision accident on August 29, 1966, aged 26.

== Major results ==
1962
Gran Premio Somma
Coppa d'Inverno
1963
Milan-Vignola

2nd

1964
Giro d'Italia

Winner 11th stage

1965
Giro d'Italia

Winner 12th and 17th stage

1966
Coppa Bernocchi
Giro d'Italia

Winner 6th stage

Tirreno–Adriatico

Winner 3rd stage
