= Vittadello (cycling team) =

Italian professional cycling team

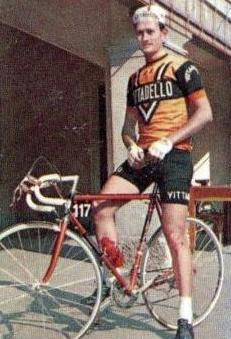
- Marino Vigna wearing the team's jersey

Team information
- Registered: Italy
- Founded: 1965
- Disbanded: 1968
- Discipline: Road

Key personnel
- Team managers: Gino Bartali; Gianfranco Del Corso

Team name history
- 1965–1967 1968: Vittadello; Pepsi-Cola

Vittadello was an Italian professional cycling team that existed from 1965 to 1968. It was known as Pepsi-Cola for its final season in 1968.

They participated in 4 editions of the Giro d'Italia, earning 7 stage wins. The team also won the 1966 Tour de Suisse with Ambrogio Portalupi.
