= Giro d'Italia records and statistics =

Since the first Giro d'Italia in 1909 and as of 2025, there have been 2,116 stages. This number includes half-stages, prologues, and a small number of stages cancelled mid-race or immediately before the start. Since 1931, the race leader following each stage has been awarded the pink jersey (Italian: Maglia rosa).

Although the leader of the classification after each stage gets a pink jersey, he is not considered the winner of the pink jersey, only the wearer. Only after the final stage is complete, the wearer of the pink jersey is considered the winner of the pink jersey, and thereby the winner of the Giro d'Italia. In 2020, British rider Tao Geoghegan Hart became the first cyclist to win the overall pink jersey, having never worn it during the race itself.

In this article first-place-classifications before 1931 are also counted as if a pink jersey was awarded. Nonetheless, the number of pink jerseys awarded is not equal to the number of stages. In the 1912 Giro d'Italia, the race was contested by teams, so no individual cyclist is counted in this statistic. Sometimes more cyclists were leading the classification (1925 after stages 2 and 3, 1936 after stage 6). On the other hand, jerseys were not awarded in between any of the 51 pairs of half-stages that took place during the history of the Giro. Thus, as of 2025, 2,040 pink jerseys have been awarded in the Giro d'Italia to 283 different riders.

== Individual records ==
Key:

Cyclists who are still active

In previous Giri d'Italia, sometimes a stage was split in two. On such occasions, only the cyclist leading at the end of the day is counted. The "Maglia Rosa" column gives the number of days that the cyclist wore the pink jersey as the leader of the classification (Note: There were prologues for three Giro editions that did not count towards the general classification, but were used to determine what rider would wear the race leader's maglia rosa on the first stage of the race. The winners of these prologues therefore wore the leader's jersey for one more day, but were not the leaders of the general classification: the prologue for the 1968 Giro, won by Charly Grosskost.; the prologue for the 1971 Giro. Salvarani won the prologue and each member of their team (Gimondi, Motta, Emilio Casalini, Ottavio Crepaldi, Ercole Gualazzini, Pietro Guerra, Antoon Houbrechts, Primo Mori, Roberto Poggiali and Dino Zandegù wore a maglia rosa during the race's first stage.; the prologue for the 1973 Giro was not a typical prologue as it was a two-man team time trial, not the normal individual time trial. Results from the stage were used to determine the first wearers of the maglia rosa and maglia ciclamino (English: mauve, or purple, jersey). The rider with the quickest time of the two winners (Merckx) would wear the pink jersey, while the second rider (Roger Swerts) wore the purple jersey.; The prologue for the 1978 Giro not only did not count towards GC, but also did not award its winner Dietrich Thurau any distinctive jersey.), the "Giro wins" column gives the number of days that the cyclist won the pink jersey. The next four columns indicate the number of times the rider won the points classification, the King of the Mountains classification, and the young rider competition, and the years in which the pink jersey was worn, with bold years indicating an overall Giro win. For example: Eddy Merckx has spent 76 days as leader of the race, won the general classification five times; won the points classification two times, won the mountains classification one time, and never won the young rider classification. He wore the pink jersey in the 1968, 1970, 1972, 1973, and 1974 editions of the race (which he all won) as well as 1969 (which he did not win).

After Alberto Contador was stripped from his victory in the 2011 Giro d'Italia, Michele Scarponi became the new winner.

- Ranked by most days in the Maglia Rosa, updated until after Stage 21 of the 2026 Giro d'Italia.

Rank	Name	Country	Maglia Rosa	Giro Wins	Points	KoM	Young rider	Years
1	Eddy Merckx	Belgium	76	5	2	1	0	1968, 1969, 1970, 1972, 1973, 1974
2	Alfredo Binda	Italy	61	5	0	1	0	1925, 1927, 1928, 1929, 1931, 1933
3	Francesco Moser	Italy	50	1	4	0	0	1976, 1977, 1979, 1980, 1981, 1982, 1984, 1985
4	Giuseppe Saronni	Italy	48	2	4	0	0	1979, 1981, 1983, 1985, 1986
5=	Gino Bartali	Italy	42	3	0	7	0	1936, 1937, 1939, 1946, 1947
5=	Jacques Anquetil	France	42	2	0	0	0	1959, 1960, 1961, 1964, 1967
7=	Fausto Coppi	Italy	31	5	0	3	0	1940, 1947, 1949, 1952, 1953, 1954
7=	Bernard Hinault	France	31	3	0	0	0	1980, 1982, 1985
9	Miguel Induráin	Spain	29	2	0	0	0	1992, 1993
10=	Costante Girardengo	Italy	26	2	0	0	0	1919, 1921, 1923, 1925, 1926
10=	Roberto Visentini	Italy	26	1	0	0	1	1980, 1981, 1985, 1986, 1987
12=	Fiorenzo Magni	Italy	24	3	0	0	0	1948, 1951, 1955
12=	Gilberto Simoni	Italy	24	2	1	0	0	2001, 2003, 2004
14=	Alberto Contador	Spain	23	2	0	0	0	2008, 2015
14=	Hugo Koblet	Switzerland	23	1	0	1	0	1950, 1953
14=	Giovanni Valetti	Italy	23	2	0	1	0	1937, 1938, 1939
17	Johan de Muynck	Belgium	22	1	0	0	0	1976, 1978
18=	Franco Chioccioli	Italy	21	1	0	0	1	1988, 1991
18=	Tony Rominger	Switzerland	21	1	1	0	0	1995
20=	Gianni Bugno	Italy	20	1	1	0	0	1990
20=	Felice Gimondi	Italy	20	3	0	0	0	1967, 1969, 1976
20=	Vincenzo Nibali	Italy	20	2	0	0	0	2010, 2011, 2013, 2016
20=	Tadej Pogačar	Slovenia	20	1	0	1	0	2024
20=	Pavel Tonkov	Russia	20	1	0	0	2	1996, 1997
25=	Vittorio Adorni	Italy	19	1	0	0	0	1963, 1964, 1965, 1966
25=	Ivan Basso	Italy	19	2	0	0	0	2005, 2006, 2010
25=	Evgeni Berzin	Russia	19	1	0	0	1	1994
25=	Charly Gaul	Luxembourg	19	2	0	2	0	1956, 1957, 1959
29=	Danilo Di Luca	Italy	18	1	0	0	0	2005, 2007 (Note: Danilo Di Luca wore the pink jersey for seven additional days in 2009, when he also won the points classification; these results have been stripped, and are not included in this table.)
29=	Stephen Roche	Ireland	18	1	0	0	0	1987
31=	Carlo Clerici	Switzerland	17	1	0	0	0	1954
31=	Tom Dumoulin	Netherlands	17	1	0	0	0	2016, 2017, 2018
31=	Carlo Galetti	Italy	17	2	0	0	0	1909, 1910, 1911
31=	Learco Guerra	Italy	17	1	0	0	0	1931, 1932, 1933, 1934
35=	João Almeida	Portugal	15	0	0	0	1	2020
35=	Vasco Bergamaschi	Italy	15	1	0	0	0	1935, 1939
35=	Giovanni Brunero	Italy	15	3	0	0	0	1921, 1922, 1925, 1926
35=	Giordano Cottur	Italy	15	0	0	0	0	1946, 1948, 1949
35=	Laurent Fignon	France	15	1	0	1	0	1982, 1984, 1989
35=	Luigi Marchisio	Italy	15	1	0	0	0	1930, 1931
35=	Simon Yates	Great Britain	15	1	0	0	0	2018, 2025
42=	Richard Carapaz	Ecuador	14	1	0	0	0	2019, 2022
42=	Silvano Contini	Italy	14	0	0	0	1	1981, 1982, 1983, 1989
42=	Michele Dancelli	Italy	14	0	0	0	0	1964, 1965, 1967, 1968
42=	José Manuel Fuente	Spain	14	0	0	4	0	1972, 1974
42=	Marco Pantani	Italy	14	1	0	1	0	1998, 1999
42=	Paolo Savoldelli	Italy	14	2	0	0	0	2002, 2005, 2006
48=	Gaetano Belloni	Italy	13	1	0	0	0	1920, 1921, 1922, 1929
48=	Egan Bernal	Colombia	13	1	0	0	1	2021
50=	Franco Balmamion	Italy	12	2	0	0	0	1962, 1963
50=	Alex Zülle	Switzerland	12	0	0	0	0	1998
52=	Moreno Argentin	Italy	11	0	0	0	0	1993, 1994
52=	Francesco Casagrande	Italy	11	0	0	1	0	2000
52=	Damiano Cunego	Italy	11	1	0	0	0	2004
52=	Isaac del Toro	Mexico	11	0	0	0	1	2025
52=	Ivan Gotti	Italy	11	2	0	0	0	1997, 1999
52=	Julio Jiménez	Spain	11	0	0	0	0	1966
58=	Jens Heppner	Germany	10	0	0	0	0	2002
58=	Juan Pedro López	Spain	10	0	0	0	1	2022
58=	Denis Menchov	Russia	10	1	1	0	0	2009
58=	Claudio Michelotto	Italy	10	0	0	1	0	1971
58=	Michel Pollentier	Belgium	10	1	0	0	0	1977
58=	Joaquim Rodríguez	Spain	10	0	1	0	0	2012
58=	Diego Ronchini	Italy	10	0	0	0	0	1963
65=	Bartolomeo Aimo	Italy	9	0	0	0	0	1922, 1923, 1924
65=	Louison Bobet	France	9	0	0	1	0	1957
65=	Afonso Eulálio	Portugal	9	0	0	0	1	2026
65=	Pasquale Fornara	Italy	9	0	0	1	0	1953, 1956
65=	Dario Frigo	Italy	9	0	0	0	0	2001
65=	Francisco Galdós	Spain	9	0	0	1	0	1975
65=	Stefano Garzelli	Italy	9	1	0	2	0	2000, 2002, 2003
65=	Gastone Nencini	Italy	9	1	0	1	0	1955, 1957
65=	Vito Ortelli	Italy	9	0	0	0	0	1946, 1948
65=	Arnaldo Pambianco	Italy	9	1	0	0	0	1958, 1961
65=	Nairo Quintana	Colombia	9	1	0	0	1	2014, 2017
65=	Primož Roglič	Slovenia	9	1	0	0	0	2019, 2023, 2025
77=	Fausto Bertoglio	Italy	8	1	0	0	0	1975
77=	Alessandro Fantini	Italy	8	0	0	0	0	1956
77=	Andrew Hampsten	United States	8	1	0	1	0	1988
77=	Jos Hoevenaers	Belgium	8	0	0	0	0	1960
77=	Laurent Jalabert	France	8	0	1	0	0	1999
77=	Bob Jungels	Luxembourg	8	0	0	0	2	2016, 2017
77=	Adolfo Leoni	Italy	8	0	0	0	0	1949
77=	Michael Matthews	Australia	8	0	0	0	0	2014, 2015
77=	Gianni Motta	Italy	8	1	1	0	0	1966
77=	José Pérez Francés	Spain	8	0	0	0	0	1967
77=	Domenico Piemontesi	Italy	8	0	0	0	0	1926, 1928, 1935
77=	Geraint Thomas	Great Britain	8	0	0	0	0	2023
77=	Rik Van Steenbergen	Belgium	8	0	0	0	0	1951, 1957
77=	Jonas Vingegaard	Denmark	8	1	0	0	0	2026
77=	Giovanni Visconti	Italy	8	0	0	1	0	2008
92=	Ercole Baldini	Italy	7	1	0	0	0	1958
92=	Erik Breukink	Netherlands	7	0	0	0	0	1987, 1989
92=	Alfonso Calzolari	Italy	7	1	0	0	0	1914
92=	Armand Desmet	Belgium	7	0	0	0	0	1962
92=	Antonio Pesenti	Italy	7	1	0	0	0	1932
92=	Alessandro Petacchi	Italy	7	0	1	0	0	2003, 2009
92=	Massimo Podenzana	Italy	7	0	0	0	0	1988
92=	Giancarlo Polidori	Italy	7	0	0	0	0	1969
92=	Michele Scarponi	Italy	7	1	1	0	0	2011
92=	Fritz Schär	Switzerland	7	0	0	0	0	1950, 1951
102=	Giancarlo Astrua	Italy	6	0	0	0	0	1951, 1952
102=	Franco Bitossi	Italy	6	0	2	3	0	1970
102=	Francesco Camusso	Italy	6	1	0	0	0	1931, 1934
102=	Cino Cinelli	Italy	6	0	0	0	0	1939
102=	Mario Cipollini	Italy	6	0	3	0	0	1995, 1997, 1999, 2000, 2002
102=	Valerio Conti	Italy	6	0	0	0	0	2019
102=	Nino Defilippis	Italy	6	0	0	0	0	1952, 1957
102=	Cesare Del Cancia	Italy	6	0	0	0	0	1938
102=	Giuseppe Enrici	Italy	6	1	0	0	0	1924
102=	Cadel Evans	Australia	6	0	1	0	0	2002, 2010, 2014
102=	Luigi Ganna	Italy	6	1	0	0	0	1909
102=	Giuseppe Olmo	Italy	6	0	0	0	0	1934, 1935, 1936
102=	Wladimiro Panizza	Italy	6	0	0	0	0	1980
102=	Giovanni Pettinati	Italy	6	0	0	0	0	1958
102=	Miguel Poblet	Spain	6	0	0	0	0	1961
102=	Davide Rebellin	Italy	6	0	0	0	0	1996
118=	David Arroyo	Spain	5	0	0	0	0	2010
118=	Giovanni Battaglin	Italy	5	1	0	0	0	1975, 1981
118=	Aldo Bini	Italy	5	0	0	0	0	1936
118=	Hermann Buse	Germany	5	0	0	0	0	1932
118=	Filippo Ganna	Italy	5	0	0	0	0	2020, 2021
118=	Ryder Hesjedal	Canada	5	1	0	0	0	2012
118=	Steven Kruijswijk	Netherlands	5	0	0	0	0	2016
118=	Andreas Leknessund	Norway	5	0	0	0	0	2023
118=	Freddy Maertens	Belgium	5	0	0	0	0	1977
118=	Bruno Mealli	Italy	5	0	0	0	0	1965
118=	Mads Pedersen	Denmark	5	0	1	0	0	2025
118=	Marco Pinotti	Italy	5	0	0	0	0	2007, 2011
118=	Alexander Vinokourov	Kazakhstan	5	0	0	0	0	2010
131=	Graziano Battistini	Italy	4	0	0	0	0	1962
131=	Paolo Bettini	Italy	4	0	2	0	0	2005
131=	Mark Cavendish	Great Britain	4	0	1	0	0	2009, 2011, 2013
131=	Rohan Dennis	Australia	4	0	0	0	0	2018
131=	Remco Evenepoel	Belgium	4	0	0	0	0	2023
131=	Pierino Favalli	Italy	4	0	0	0	0	1940
131=	Federico Gay	Italy	4	0	0	0	0	1924
131=	Serhiy Honchar	Ukraine	4	0	0	0	0	1998, 2006
131=	Silvio Martinello	Italy	4	0	0	0	0	1996
131=	Luca Paolini	Italy	4	0	0	0	0	2013
131=	Franco Pellizotti	Italy	4	0	0	0	0	2008
131=	Giovanni Rossignoli	Italy	4	0	0	0	0	1911
131=	Silvano Schiavon	Italy	4	0	0	0	0	1967, 1969
131=	Kanstantsin Sivtsov	Belarus	4	0	0	0	0	2011
131=	Antonio Suárez	Spain	4	0	0	0	0	1961, 1962
131=	Rigoberto Urán	Colombia	4	0	0	0	1	2014
131=	Rik Verbrugghe	Belgium	4	0	0	0	0	2001
131=	Pieter Weening	Netherlands	4	0	0	0	0	2011
149=	Marino Basso	Italy	3	0	1	0	0	1971, 1972
149=	Jean-François Bernard	France	3	0	0	0	0	1988
149=	Fermo Camellini	Italy	3	0	0	0	0	1946
149=	Agostino Coletto	Italy	3	0	0	0	0	1958
149=	Ugo Colombo	Italy	3	0	0	0	0	1971, 1972
149=	Guido De Santi	Italy	3	0	0	0	0	1953
149=	Roger De Vlaeminck	Belgium	3	0	3	0	0	1976
149=	Jef Demuysere	Belgium	3	0	0	0	0	1933
149=	Mario Fazio	Italy	3	0	0	0	0	1949
149=	Chris Froome	Great Britain	3	1	0	1	0	2018
149=	Raphaël Géminiani	France	3	0	0	2	0	1955
149=	Antonio Gómez del Moral	Spain	3	0	0	0	0	1967
149=	Angelo Gremo	Italy	3	0	0	0	0	1914, 1920
149=	Jai Hindley	Australia	3	1	0	0	0	2020, 2022
149=	Knut Knudsen	Norway	3	0	0	0	0	1975, 1981
149=	Bruno Leali	Italy	3	0	0	0	0	1993
149=	Giuseppe Minardi	Italy	3	0	0	0	0	1954
149=	Enrico Mollo	Italy	3	0	0	0	0	1940
149=	Cristian Moreni	Italy	3	0	0	0	0	2000
149=	Andrea Noè	Italy	3	0	0	0	0	1998, 2007
149=	Enrico Paolini	Italy	3	0	0	0	0	1971
149=	Gösta Pettersson	Sweden	3	1	0	0	0	1971
149=	Taylor Phinney	United States	3	0	0	0	0	2012
149=	Yaroslav Popovych	Ukraine	3	0	0	0	0	2004
149=	Richie Porte	Australia	3	0	0	0	1	2010
149=	Giuseppe Santhià	Italy	3	0	0	0	0	1913
149=	Matteo Tosatto	Italy	3	0	0	0	0	2000
149=	Attila Valter	Hungary	3	0	0	0	0	2021
149=	Mathieu van der Poel	Netherlands	3	0	0	0	0	2022
149=	Renzo Zanazzi	Italy	3	0	0	0	0	1947
179=	Bruno Armirail	France	2	0	0	0	0	2023
179=	Osvaldo Bailo	Italy	2	0	0	0	0	1940
179=	Gianbattista Baronchelli	Italy	2	0	0	0	0	1986
179=	Antonio Bevilacqua	Italy	2	0	0	0	0	1946
179=	Jeroen Blijlevens	Netherlands	2	0	0	0	0	1999
179=	Gianluca Brambilla	Italy	2	0	0	0	0	2016
179=	Ezio Cecchi	Italy	2	0	0	0	0	1948
179=	Acácio da Silva	Portugal	2	0	0	0	0	1989
179=	Alessandro De Marchi	Italy	2	0	0	0	0	2021
179=	Urs Freuler	Switzerland	2	0	1	0	0	1983, 1986
179=	Enrico Gasparotto	Italy	2	0	0	0	0	2007
179=	Wilco Kelderman	Netherlands	2	0	0	0	0	2020
179=	Michele Mara	Italy	2	0	0	0	0	1930, 1931
179=	Thierry Marie	France	2	0	0	0	0	1992
179=	Bradley McGee	Australia	2	0	0	0	0	2004
179=	Bruno Monti	Italy	2	0	0	0	0	1955
179=	Aldo Moser	Italy	2	0	0	0	0	1958, 1971
179=	Enzo Moser	Italy	2	0	0	0	0	1964
179=	Ramūnas Navardauskas	Lithuania	2	0	0	0	0	2012
179=	Albano Negro	Italy	2	0	0	0	0	1965
179=	Carlo Oriani	Italy	2	1	0	0	0	1913
179=	Eberardo Pavesi	Italy	2	0	0	0	0	1913
179=	Jan Polanc	Slovenia	2	0	0	0	0	2019
179=	Olaf Pollack	Germany	2	0	0	0	0	2004, 2006
179=	Jean-Paul van Poppel	Netherlands	2	0	0	0	0	1986, 1989
179=	Wilfried Reybrouck	Belgium	2	0	0	0	0	1974
179=	Paolo Rosola	Italy	2	0	0	0	0	1983
179=	Stefan Schumacher	Germany	2	0	0	0	0	2006
179=	Patrick Sercu	Belgium	2	0	0	0	0	1976
179=	Guillermo Thomas Silva	Uruguay	2	0	0	0	0	2026
179=	Rik Van Linden	Belgium	2	0	0	0	0	1978
179=	Guillaume Van Tongerloo	Belgium	2	0	0	0	0	1961
211=	Giorgio Albani	Italy	1	0	0	0	0	1952
211=	Pierino Albini	Italy	1	0	0	0	0	1913
211=	Andrey Amador	Costa Rica	1	0	0	0	0	2016
211=	Fabio Aru	Italy	1	0	0	0	1	2015
211=	Ernesto Azzini	Italy	1	0	0	0	0	1910
211=	Giuseppe Azzini	Italy	1	0	0	0	0	1913
211=	Pierino Baffi	Italy	1	0	0	0	0	1956
211=	Michele Bartoli	Italy	1	0	0	0	0	1998
211=	Dario Beni	Italy	1	0	0	0	0	1909
211=	Quirico Bernacchi	Italy	1	0	0	0	0	1937
211=	Olimpio Bizzi	Italy	1	0	0	0	0	1940
211=	Davide Boifava	Italy	1	0	0	0	0	1969
211=	Patrick Bonnet	France	1	0	0	0	0	1982
211=	Gabriele Bosisio	Italy	1	0	0	0	0	2008
211=	Salvador Botella	Spain	1	0	0	0	0	1958
211=	Éric Boyer	France	1	0	0	0	0	1991
211=	Gregor Braun	Germany	1	0	0	0	0	1981
211=	Dino Bruni	Italy	1	0	0	0	0	1960
211=	Philippe Casado	France	1	0	0	0	0	1991
211=	Esteban Chaves	Colombia	1	0	0	0	0	2016
211=	Carlo Chiappano	Italy	1	0	0	0	0	1965
211=	Giulio Ciccone	Italy	1	0	0	2	0	2026
211=	Marco Cimatti	Italy	1	0	0	0	0	1938
211=	Simon Clarke	Australia	1	0	0	0	0	2015
211=	Oreste Conte	Italy	1	0	0	0	0	1950
211=	Angelo Conterno	Italy	1	0	0	0	0	1952
211=	Armand de Las Cuevas	France	1	0	0	0	0	1994
211=	Juan Carlos Domínguez	Spain	1	0	0	0	0	2002
211=	Wim van Est	Netherlands	1	0	0	0	0	1953
211=	Walter Fantini	Italy	1	0	0	0	0	1935
211=	Luciano Galbo	Italy	1	0	0	0	0	1965
211=	Fernando Gaviria	Colombia	1	0	1	0	0	2017
211=	Tao Geoghegan Hart	Great Britain	1	1	0	0	1	2020
211=	Simon Gerrans	Australia	1	0	0	0	0	2015
211=	Luigi Giacobbe	Italy	1	0	0	0	0	1931
211=	André Greipel	Germany	1	0	0	0	0	2017
211=	José Enrique Gutiérrez	Spain	1	0	0	0	0	2000
211=	Pascal Hervé	France	1	0	0	0	0	1996
211=	Jan Hruška	Czech Republic	1	0	0	0	0	2000
211=	Beñat Intxausti	Spain	1	0	0	0	0	2013
211=	Marcel Kittel	Germany	1	0	0	0	0	2016
211=	Brett Lancaster	Australia	1	0	0	0	0	2005
211=	Pietro Linari	Italy	1	0	0	0	0	1925
211=	Dino Liviero	Italy	1	0	0	0	0	1962
211=	Thomas Löfkvist	Sweden	1	0	0	0	0	2009
211=	Paul Magnier	France	1	0	1	0	0	2026
211=	Adriano Malori	Italy	1	0	0	0	0	2012
211=	Alfredo Martini	Italy	1	0	0	0	0	1950
211=	Robbie McEwen	Australia	1	0	0	0	0	2005
211=	Vincenzo Meco	Italy	1	0	0	0	0	1962
211=	Guido Messina	Italy	1	0	0	0	0	1955
211=	David Millar	Great Britain	1	0	0	0	0	2011
211=	Jhonatan Narváez	Ecuador	1	0	0	0	0	2024
211=	Antonio Negrini	Italy	1	0	0	0	0	1930
211=	Abraham Olano	Spain	1	0	0	0	0	1996
211=	Giuseppe Olivieri	Italy	1	0	0	0	0	1920
211=	Lucien Petit-Breton	France	1	0	0	0	0	1911
211=	Lukas Pöstlberger	Austria	1	0	0	0	0	2017
211=	Tommy Prim	Sweden	1	0	0	0	1	1983
211=	Salvatore Puccio	Italy	1	0	0	0	0	2013
211=	Ivan Quaranta	Italy	1	0	0	0	0	1999
211=	Antonin Rolland	France	1	0	0	0	0	1957
211=	Laurent Roux	France	1	0	0	0	0	1998
211=	Sergio Santimaria	Italy	1	0	0	0	0	1986
211=	Vito Taccone	Italy	1	0	0	2	0	1966
211=	Nello Troggi	Italy	1	0	0	0	0	1937
211=	Svein Tuft	Canada	1	0	0	0	0	2014
211=	Diego Ulissi	Italy	1	0	0	0	0	2025
211=	Rik Van Looy	Belgium	1	0	0	1	0	1959
211=	Christian Vande Velde	United States	1	0	0	0	0	2008
211=	Willy Vannitsen	Belgium	1	0	0	0	0	1958
211=	Romeo Venturelli	Italy	1	0	0	0	0	1960
211=	Mario Vicini	Italy	1	0	0	0	0	1938
211=	Gerrit Voorting	Netherlands	1	0	0	0	0	1954
211=	Bradley Wiggins	Great Britain	1	0	0	0	0	2010
211=	Giorgio Zancanaro	Italy	1	0	0	0	0	1967
211=	Stefano Zanini	Italy	1	0	0	0	0	1996
211=	Vincenzo Zucconelli	Italy	1	0	0	0	0	1956

== Per country ==
The pink jersey has been awarded to 31 different countries since 1903. In the table below, "Jerseys" indicates the number of pink jerseys that were given to cyclists of each country. "Giro wins" stands for the number of Giro wins by cyclists of that country, "Points" for the number of times the points classification was won by a cyclist of that country, "KoM" for the number of times the mountains classification was won by a cyclist of that country, and "White" for the number of times the young rider classification was won by a cyclist of that country. The "Most recent" column shows the cyclist of the country that lead the general classification most recently. The "Different holders" column gives the number of different cyclists of the country that lead the general classification.

Updated until after Stage 21 of the 2026 Giro d'Italia

Rank	Country	Jerseys	Giro wins	Points	KoM	Young rider	Most recent cyclist	Most recent date	Different holders
1	Italy	1154	69	35	41	15	Giulio Ciccone	2026, stage 4	154
2	Belgium	160	7	5	6	1	Remco Evenepoel	2023, stage 9	17
3	Spain	137	4	1	17	1	Juan Pedro López	2022, stage 13	17
4	France	124	6	5	6	1	Paul Magnier	2026, stage 1	18
5	Switzerland	82	3	2	3	0	Alex Zülle	1998, stage 16	6
6	Russia	49	3	2	0	5	Denis Menchov	2009, stage 21	3
7	Netherlands	44	1	3	1	0	Mathieu van der Poel	2022, stage 3	10
8	Great Britain	33	3	1	2	1	Simon Yates	2025, stage 21	7
9	Slovenia	31	2	0	1	0	Primož Roglič	2025, stage 7	3
10	Australia	30	1	1	1	1	Jai Hindley	2022, stage 21	10
11	Colombia	28	2	1	6	6	Egan Bernal	2021, stage 21	5
12	Luxembourg	27	2	0	2	3	Bob Jungels	2017, stage 8	2
13	Portugal	26	0	0	1	2	Afonso Eulálio	2026, stage 13	3
14	Germany	22	0	1	1	0	André Greipel	2017, stage 2	7
15	Ireland	18	1	0	0	0	Stephen Roche	1987, stage 22	1
16	Ecuador	15	1	0	0	0	Jhonatan Narváez	2024, stage 1	2
17	Denmark	13	1	1	0	0	Jonas Vingegaard	2026, stage 21	2
18	United States	12	1	0	1	0	Taylor Phinney	2012, stage 3	3
19	Mexico	11	0	0	1	1	Isaac del Toro	2025, stage 19	1
20	Norway	8	0	0	0	0	Andreas Leknessund	2023, stage 8	2
21	Ukraine	7	0	0	0	0	Sergei Honchar	2006, stage 7	2
22	Canada	6	1	0	0	0	Svein Tuft	2014, stage 1	2
23=	Kazakhstan	5	0	0	0	0	Alexander Vinokourov	2010, stage 10	1
23=	Sweden	5	1	0	0	1	Thomas Löfkvist	2009, stage 4	3
25	Belarus	4	0	0	0	0	Kanstantsin Sivtsov	2011, stage 12	1
26	Hungary	3	0	0	0	0	Attila Valter	2021, stage 8	1
27=	Lithuania	2	0	0	0	0	Ramūnas Navardauskas	2012, stage 5	1
27=	Uruguay	2	0	0	0	0	Guillermo Thomas Silva	2026, stage 3	1
29=	Austria	1	0	0	0	0	Lukas Pöstlberger	2017, stage 1	1
29=	Costa Rica	1	0	0	0	0	Andrey Amador	2016, stage 13	1
29=	Czech Republic	1	0	0	0	1	Jan Hruška	2000, Prologue	1
32=	Slovakia	0	0	1	0	0	–	–	0
32=	Uzbekistan	0	0	1	0	0	–	–	0
32=	Venezuela	0	0	0	1	0	–	–	0

== Stage wins per rider ==
Some 34 riders have won more than 10 stages at the Giro (as of Giro 2026, stage 21).

Rank	Name	Country	Wins	First win	Last win
1	Mario Cipollini	Italy	42	1989	2003
2	Alfredo Binda	Italy	41	1925	1933
3	Learco Guerra	Italy	31	1930	1937
4	Costante Girardengo	Italy	30	1913	1926
5	Eddy Merckx	Belgium	25^{*}	1967	1974
6	Giuseppe Saronni	Italy	24	1978	1985
7	Francesco Moser	Italy	23	1973	1986
8	Fausto Coppi	Italy	22	1940	1955
=	Roger De Vlaeminck	Belgium	22	1972	1979
=	Alessandro Petacchi	Italy	22	2003	2011
11	Franco Bitossi	Italy	21	1964	1975
12	Giuseppe Olmo	Italy	20	1933	1937
=	Miguel Poblet	Spain	20	1956	1961
14	Gino Bartali	Italy	17	1935	1950
=	Adolfo Leoni	Italy	17	1938	1951
=	Mark Cavendish	Great Britain	17	2008	2023
17	Guido Bontempi	Italy	16	1981	1993
18	Raffaele di Paco	Italy	15	1930	1938
=	Rik Van Steenbergen	Belgium	15	1951	1957
=	Marino Basso	Italy	15	1966	1977
=	Urs Freuler	Switzerland	15	1982	1989
22	Gaetano Belloni	Italy	13	1919	1929
=	Olimpio Bizzi	Italy	13	1936	1950
=	Oreste Conte	Italy	13	1946	1953
=	Patrick Sercu	Belgium	13	1970	1976
=	Moreno Argentin	Italy	13	1981	1994
27	Rik Van Looy	Belgium	12	1959	1962
=	Robbie McEwen	Australia	12	2002	2007
29	Domenico Piemontesi	Italy	11	1926	1935
=	Antonio Bevilacqua	Italy	11	1946	1952
=	Charly Gaul	Luxembourg	11	1956	1961
=	Vittorio Adorni	Italy	11	1962	1969
=	Michele Dancelli	Italy	11	1964	1970
=	Paolo Rosola	Italy	11	1981	1988

^{*}Counting the two-man team time trial Prologue in 1973.

Five riders have won at least 8 stages in a single year:

- Alfredo Binda (ITA) - 12 (1927), 8 (1929)
- Learco Guerra (ITA) - 10 (1934)
- Giuseppe Olmo (ITA) - 10 (1936)
- Alessandro Petacchi (ITA) - 9 (2004)
- Costante Girardengo (ITA) - 8 (1923)

== Stage wins per country ==
Riders representing 37 countries have won at least one stage in Giro (as of Giro 2026, stage 21).

Country	#
Italy	1302
Belgium	173
Spain	115
France	84
Switzerland	57
Australia	45
Germany	44
Great Britain	38
Netherlands	37
Colombia	34

Country	#
Denmark	26
Russia	24
United States	18
Slovenia	15
Norway	13
Luxembourg	12
Ecuador	10
Ukraine	9
Sweden	9
Ireland	9

Country	#
Portugal	7
Slovakia	6
Czech Republic	6
Poland	5
Venezuela	4
Belarus	4
Mexico	4
Lithuania	3
Soviet Union	2
Latvia	2

Country	#
Argentina	2
South Africa	1
Uzbekistan	1
Costa Rica	1
Estonia	1
Austria	1
Eritrea	1
Uruguay	1

Detailed table
Year	(Italy)	(Belgium)	(Spain)	(France)	(Switzerland)	(Germany)	(Australia)	(United Kingdom)	(Colombia)	(Netherlands)	(Russia)	(United States)	(Denmark)	(Slovenia)	(Norway)	(Luxembourg)	(Ukraine)	(Sweden)	(Republic of Ireland)	(Portugal)	(Slovakia)	(Czech Republic)	(Ecuador)	(Poland)	(Venezuela)	(Belarus)	(Mexico)	(Lithuania)	(Soviet Union)	(Latvia)	(Argentina)	(South Africa)	(Uzbekistan)	(Costa Rica)	(Estonia)	(Austria)	(Eritrea)
1909	8	-	-	-	-	-	-	-	-	-	-	-	-	-	-	-	-	-	-	-	-	-	-	-	-	-	-	-	-	-	-	-	-	-	-	-	-
1910	9	-	-	1	-	-	-	-	-	-	-	-	-	-	-	-	-	-	-	-	-	-	-	-	-	-	-	-	-	-	-	-	-	-	-	-	-
1911	11	-	-	1	-	-	-	-	-	-	-	-	-	-	-	-	-	-	-	-	-	-	-	-	-	-	-	-	-	-	-	-	-	-	-	-	-
1912	8	-	-	-	-	-	-	-	-	-	-	-	-	-	-	-	-	-	-	-	-	-	-	-	-	-	-	-	-	-	-	-	-	-	-	-	-
1913	9	-	-	-	-	-	-	-	-	-	-	-	-	-	-	-	-	-	-	-	-	-	-	-	-	-	-	-	-	-	-	-	-	-	-	-	-
1914	8	-	-	-	-	-	-	-	-	-	-	-	-	-	-	-	-	-	-	-	-	-	-	-	-	-	-	-	-	-	-	-	-	-	-	-	-
1919	9	-	-	-	1	-	-	-	-	-	-	-	-	-	-	-	-	-	-	-	-	-	-	-	-	-	-	-	-	-	-	-	-	-	-	-	-
1920	12	1	-	3	-	-	-	-	-	-	-	-	-	-	-	-	-	-	-	-	-	-	-	-	-	-	-	-	-	-	-	-	-	-	-	-	-
1921	10	-	-	-	-	-	-	-	-	-	-	-	-	-	-	-	-	-	-	-	-	-	-	-	-	-	-	-	-	-	-	-	-	-	-	-	-
1922	10	-	-	-	-	-	-	-	-	-	-	-	-	-	-	-	-	-	-	-	-	-	-	-	-	-	-	-	-	-	-	-	-	-	-	-	-
1923	10	-	-	-	-	-	-	-	-	-	-	-	-	-	-	-	-	-	-	-	-	-	-	-	-	-	-	-	-	-	-	-	-	-	-	-	-
1924	12	-	-	-	-	-	-	-	-	-	-	-	-	-	-	-	-	-	-	-	-	-	-	-	-	-	-	-	-	-	-	-	-	-	-	-	-
1925	12	-	-	-	-	-	-	-	-	-	-	-	-	-	-	-	-	-	-	-	-	-	-	-	-	-	-	-	-	-	-	-	-	-	-	-	-
1926	12	-	-	-	-	-	-	-	-	-	-	-	-	-	-	-	-	-	-	-	-	-	-	-	-	-	-	-	-	-	-	-	-	-	-	-	-
1927	15	-	-	-	-	-	-	-	-	-	-	-	-	-	-	-	-	-	-	-	-	-	-	-	-	-	-	-	-	-	-	-	-	-	-	-	-
1928	12	-	-	-	-	-	-	-	-	-	-	-	-	-	-	-	-	-	-	-	-	-	-	-	-	-	-	-	-	-	-	-	-	-	-	-	-
1929	14	-	-	-	-	-	-	-	-	-	-	-	-	-	-	-	-	-	-	-	-	-	-	-	-	-	-	-	-	-	-	-	-	-	-	-	-
1930	15	-	-	-	-	-	-	-	-	-	-	-	-	-	-	-	-	-	-	-	-	-	-	-	-	-	-	-	-	-	-	-	-	-	-	-	-
1931	12	-	-	-	-	-	-	-	-	-	-	-	-	-	-	-	-	-	-	-	-	-	-	-	-	-	-	-	-	-	-	-	-	-	-	-	-
1932	12	-	-	-	-	1	-	-	-	-	-	-	-	-	-	-	-	-	-	-	-	-	-	-	-	-	-	-	-	-	-	-	-	-	-	-	-
1933	14	2	-	1	-	-	-	-	-	-	-	-	-	-	-	-	-	-	-	-	-	-	-	-	-	-	-	-	-	-	-	-	-	-	-	-	-
1934	16	1	-	-	-	-	-	-	-	-	-	-	-	-	-	-	-	-	-	-	-	-	-	-	-	-	-	-	-	-	-	-	-	-	-	-	-
1935	18	-	-	2	-	-	-	-	-	-	-	-	-	-	-	-	-	-	-	-	-	-	-	-	-	-	-	-	-	-	-	-	-	-	-	-	-
1936	21	-	-	-	-	-	-	-	-	-	-	-	-	-	-	-	-	-	-	-	-	-	-	-	-	-	-	-	-	-	-	-	-	-	-	-	-
1937	23	-	-	-	-	-	-	-	-	-	-	-	-	-	-	-	-	-	-	-	-	-	-	-	-	-	-	-	-	-	-	-	-	-	-	-	-
1938	20	-	-	-	1	-	-	-	-	-	-	-	-	-	-	-	-	-	-	-	-	-	-	-	-	-	-	-	-	-	-	-	-	-	-	-	-
1939	19	-	-	-	-	-	-	-	-	-	-	-	-	-	-	-	-	-	-	-	-	-	-	-	-	-	-	-	-	-	-	-	-	-	-	-	-
1940	20	-	-	-	-	-	-	-	-	-	-	-	-	-	-	-	-	-	-	-	-	-	-	-	-	-	-	-	-	-	-	-	-	-	-	-	-
1946	19	-	-	-	-	-	-	-	-	-	-	-	-	-	-	-	-	-	-	-	-	-	-	-	-	-	-	-	-	-	-	-	-	-	-	-	-
1947	20	-	-	-	-	-	-	-	-	-	-	-	-	-	-	-	-	-	-	-	-	-	-	-	-	-	-	-	-	-	-	-	-	-	-	-	-
1948	18	1	-	-	-	-	-	-	-	-	-	-	-	-	-	-	-	-	-	-	-	-	-	-	-	-	-	-	-	-	-	-	-	-	-	-	-
1949	19	-	-	-	-	-	-	-	-	-	-	-	-	-	-	-	-	-	-	-	-	-	-	-	-	-	-	-	-	-	-	-	-	-	-	-	-
1950	15	-	-	-	3	-	-	-	-	-	-	-	-	-	-	-	-	-	-	-	-	-	-	-	-	-	-	-	-	-	-	-	-	-	-	-	-
1951	16	2	-	1	1	-	-	-	-	-	-	-	-	-	-	-	-	-	-	-	-	-	-	-	-	-	-	-	-	-	-	-	-	-	-	-	-
1952	15	4	-	-	1	-	-	-	-	-	-	-	-	-	-	-	-	-	-	-	-	-	-	-	-	-	-	-	-	-	-	-	-	-	-	-	-
1953	18	1	-	-	1	-	-	-	-	1	-	-	-	-	-	-	-	-	-	-	-	-	-	-	-	-	-	-	-	-	-	-	-	-	-	-	-
1954	12	5	-	-	3	-	-	-	-	2	-	-	-	-	-	-	-	-	-	-	-	-	-	-	-	-	-	-	-	-	-	-	-	-	-	-	-
1955	18	-	1	1	1	-	-	-	-	-	-	-	-	-	-	-	-	-	-	-	-	-	-	-	-	-	-	-	-	-	-	-	-	-	-	-	-
1956	13	-	4	-	-	-	-	-	-	2	-	-	-	-	-	3	-	-	-	-	-	-	-	-	-	-	-	-	-	-	-	-	-	-	-	-	-
1957	7	6	4	2	-	-	-	-	-	1	-	-	-	-	-	2	-	-	-	-	-	-	-	-	-	-	-	-	-	-	-	-	-	-	-	-	-
1958	13	1	5	-	-	-	-	-	-	-	-	-	-	-	-	1	-	-	-	-	-	-	-	-	-	-	-	-	-	-	-	-	-	-	-	-	-
1959	9	4	3	2	1	-	-	-	-	-	-	-	-	-	-	3	-	-	-	-	-	-	-	-	-	-	-	-	-	-	-	-	-	-	-	-	-
1960	9	5	4	4	-	-	-	-	-	-	-	-	-	-	-	1	-	-	1	-	-	-	-	-	-	-	-	-	-	-	-	-	-	-	-	-	-
1961	8	6	4	1	-	-	-	-	-	1	-	-	-	-	-	1	-	-	-	-	-	-	-	-	-	-	-	-	-	-	-	-	-	-	-	-	-
1962	12	4	3	1	-	-	-	-	-	1	-	-	-	-	-	-	-	-	-	-	-	-	-	-	-	-	-	-	-	-	-	-	-	-	-	-	-
1963	20	-	1	-	-	-	-	-	-	-	-	-	-	-	-	-	-	-	-	-	-	-	-	-	-	-	-	-	-	-	-	-	-	-	-	-	-
1964	16	1	1	1	1	1	-	-	-	1	-	-	-	-	-	-	-	-	-	-	-	-	-	-	-	-	-	-	-	-	-	-	-	-	-	-	-
1965	20	1	-	-	1	-	-	-	-	-	-	-	-	-	-	-	-	-	-	-	-	-	-	-	-	-	-	-	-	-	-	-	-	-	-	-	-
1966	17	-	2	-	-	2	-	1	-	-	-	-	-	-	-	-	-	-	-	-	-	-	-	-	-	-	-	-	-	-	-	-	-	-	-	-	-
1967	8	7	3	1	-	2	-	-	-	-	-	-	1	-	-	-	-	-	-	-	-	-	-	-	-	-	-	-	-	-	-	-	-	-	-	-	-
1968	10	8	4	1	-	-	-	-	-	-	-	-	-	-	-	-	-	-	-	-	-	-	-	-	-	-	-	-	-	-	-	-	-	-	-	-	-
1969	17	5	-	-	-	-	-	-	-	-	-	-	1	-	-	-	-	-	-	-	-	-	-	-	-	-	-	-	-	-	-	-	-	-	-	-	-
1970	14	5	1	-	-	-	-	-	-	-	-	-	-	-	-	-	-	-	-	-	-	-	-	-	-	-	-	-	-	-	-	-	-	-	-	-	-
1971	16	2	3	-	-	-	-	-	-	-	-	-	1	-	-	-	-	-	-	-	-	-	-	-	-	-	-	-	-	-	-	-	-	-	-	-	-
1972	9	10	3	-	-	-	-	-	-	-	-	-	-	-	-	-	-	1	-	-	-	-	-	-	-	-	-	-	-	-	-	-	-	-	-	-	-
1973	5	14	1	-	-	-	-	-	1	1	-	-	-	-	-	-	-	-	-	-	-	-	-	-	-	-	-	-	-	-	-	-	-	-	-	-	-
1974	10	7	6	-	-	-	-	-	-	-	-	-	-	-	-	-	-	-	-	-	-	-	-	-	-	-	-	-	-	-	-	-	-	-	-	-	-
1975	8	11	2	-	-	-	-	-	1	-	-	-	-	-	1	-	-	-	-	-	-	-	-	-	-	-	-	-	-	-	-	-	-	-	-	-	-
1976	10	12	2	-	-	-	-	-	-	-	-	-	-	-	-	-	-	-	-	-	-	-	-	-	-	-	-	-	-	-	-	-	-	-	-	-	-
1977	15	11	-	-	-	-	-	-	-	-	-	-	-	-	1	-	-	-	-	-	-	-	-	-	-	-	-	-	-	-	-	-	-	-	-	-	-
1978	16	4	-	-	-	2	-	-	-	-	-	-	-	-	-	-	-	-	-	-	-	-	-	-	-	-	-	-	-	-	-	-	-	-	-	-	-
1979	12	3	-	-	1	-	-	-	-	-	-	-	-	-	1	-	-	2	-	-	-	-	-	-	-	-	-	-	-	-	-	1	-	-	-	-	-
1980	17	-	1	3	-	-	-	-	-	-	-	-	1	-	-	-	-	1	-	-	-	-	-	-	-	-	-	-	-	-	-	-	-	-	-	-	-
1981	18	-	1	-	2	-	-	-	-	-	-	-	-	-	3	-	-	-	-	-	-	-	-	-	-	-	-	-	-	-	-	-	-	-	-	-	-
1982	11	-	1	6	4	-	1	-	-	-	-	-	-	-	-	-	-	-	-	-	-	-	-	-	-	-	-	-	-	-	-	-	-	-	-	-	-
1983	16	2	3	-	-	1	-	-	-	-	-	-	-	-	-	-	-	1	-	-	-	-	-	-	-	-	-	-	-	-	-	-	-	-	-	-	-
1984	11	-	1	3	6	-	-	-	-	-	-	-	-	-	2	-	-	-	-	-	-	-	-	-	-	-	-	-	-	-	-	-	-	-	-	-	-
1985	13	1	-	1	5	-	-	-	-	-	-	2	-	-	-	-	-	-	-	2	-	-	-	-	-	-	-	-	-	-	-	-	-	-	-	-	-
1986	11	1	1	-	1	-	-	-	-	3	-	1	-	-	1	-	-	-	1	2	-	-	-	1	-	-	-	-	-	-	-	-	-	-	-	-	-
1987	13	1	-	3	1	-	-	1	-	3	-	-	-	-	-	-	-	-	2	-	-	-	-	-	-	-	-	-	-	-	-	-	-	-	-	-	-
1988	11	-	-	3	3	1	-	-	-	1	-	2	-	-	-	-	-	-	-	-	-	-	-	1	-	-	-	-	-	-	-	-	-	-	-	-	-
1989	5	-	-	1	4	-	1	-	2	2	-	-	3	-	-	-	-	-	-	1	-	-	-	3	-	-	-	-	-	-	-	-	-	-	-	-	-
1990	13	-	1	3	-	-	2	-	-	-	-	-	-	-	-	-	-	-	-	-	-	-	-	-	1	-	-	-	1	-	-	-	-	-	-	-	-
1991	16	-	2	2	-	-	-	1	-	-	-	-	-	-	-	-	-	-	-	-	-	-	-	-	-	-	-	-	1	-	-	-	-	-	-	-	-
1992	15	-	2	2	-	1	-	1	1	-	-	-	-	-	-	-	-	-	-	-	-	-	-	-	-	-	-	-	-	-	-	-	-	-	-	-	-
1993	16	-	2	-	-	-	-	-	-	-	2	-	1	-	-	-	-	-	-	-	-	-	-	-	-	-	-	-	-	1	-	-	-	-	-	-	-
1994	11	-	1	1	1	-	-	1	-	-	3	-	-	-	-	-	1	-	-	-	3	-	-	-	-	-	-	-	-	-	-	-	1	-	-	-	-
1995	10	-	1	-	6	-	-	-	1	-	1	-	1	-	-	-	1	-	-	-	1	-	-	-	-	-	-	-	-	-	-	-	-	-	-	-	-
1996	13	-	1	1	1	-	-	-	-	-	2	-	1	-	-	-	2	1	-	-	-	-	-	-	-	-	-	-	-	-	-	-	-	-	-	-	-
1997	13	-	1	-	-	1	-	-	1	-	4	-	-	-	-	-	1	1	-	-	-	-	-	-	-	-	-	-	-	-	-	-	-	-	-	-	-
1998	15	-	1	1	3	-	-	-	-	-	1	-	-	-	-	-	1	1	-	-	-	-	-	-	-	-	-	-	-	-	-	-	-	-	-	-	-
1999	12	-	1	4	-	-	-	-	1	2	-	-	-	-	-	-	1	-	-	-	-	-	-	-	-	-	-	-	-	1	-	-	-	-	-	-	-
2000	13	1	2	-	-	-	1	-	1	-	1	-	-	-	-	-	-	-	-	-	-	3	-	-	-	-	-	-	-	-	-	-	-	-	-	-	-
2001	15	1	1	-	-	2	-	-	1	-	-	-	-	-	-	-	-	-	-	-	-	-	-	-	-	-	1	-	-	-	-	-	-	-	-	-	-
2002	11	1	3	-	-	-	2	-	-	-	1	1	-	-	-	-	-	-	-	-	-	-	-	-	-	-	2	-	-	-	-	-	-	-	-	-	-
2003	16	-	1	-	-	-	2	-	-	-	-	-	-	-	1	-	1	-	-	-	-	-	-	-	-	-	-	-	-	-	-	-	-	-	-	-	-
2004	16	-	-	-	-	-	2	-	-	-	1	1	-	-	-	-	1	-	-	-	-	-	-	-	-	-	-	-	-	-	-	-	-	-	-	-	-
2005	11	-	1	1	-	-	4	-	2	-	-	1	-	-	-	-	-	-	-	-	-	-	-	-	1	-	-	-	-	-	-	-	-	-	-	-	-
2006	8	1	2	-	-	3	3	-	1	-	-	-	1	-	-	-	-	-	-	-	-	-	-	-	-	-	-	1	-	-	-	-	-	-	-	-	-
2007	12	-	1	-	-	2	1	-	1	-	-	-	-	-	2	-	-	-	-	-	-	-	-	-	-	-	-	-	-	-	2	-	-	-	-	-	-
2008	14	-	-	-	-	2	-	2	-	-	1	1	-	-	-	-	-	-	-	-	-	-	-	-	-	1	-	-	-	-	-	-	-	-	-	-	-
2009	6	1	2	-	-	1	1	3	-	-	3	-	-	-	1	-	-	-	-	-	-	-	-	-	-	1	-	1	-	-	-	-	-	-	-	-	-
2010	7	1	-	2	1	1	3	1	-	-	1	2	1	-	-	-	-	1	-	-	-	-	-	-	-	-	-	-	-	-	-	-	-	-	-	-	-
2011	6	1	4	1	-	1	-	3	-	1	-	-	-	-	-	-	-	-	-	-	-	-	-	-	2	1	-	-	-	-	-	-	-	-	-	-	-
2012	6	1	4	-	-	-	1	3	1	-	-	2	1	-	-	-	-	-	-	-	-	1	-	-	-	-	-	-	-	-	-	-	-	1	-	-	-
2013	7	-	1	-	-	1	1	7	1	-	1	-	-	-	-	-	-	-	-	-	-	-	-	-	-	-	-	1	-	-	-	-	-	-	-	-	-
2014	6	-	-	3	-	2	4	-	4	1	-	-	-	1	-	-	-	-	-	-	-	-	-	-	-	-	-	-	-	-	-	-	-	-	-	-	-
2015	9	3	3	-	-	1	2	-	-	-	1	-	-	1	-	-	-	-	-	-	-	-	-	-	-	1	-	-	-	-	-	-	-	-	-	-	-
2016	6	1	2	-	-	7	-	-	1	1	1	-	-	1	-	-	-	-	-	-	-	-	-	-	-	-	-	-	-	-	-	-	-	-	1	-	-
2017	1	-	3	2	1	1	1	-	5	3	-	1	-	1	-	1	-	-	-	-	-	-	-	-	-	-	-	-	-	-	-	-	-	-	-	1	-
2018	5	1	1	-	-	1	1	5	1	1	-	-	-	1	-	-	-	-	3	-	-	-	1	-	-	-	-	-	-	-	-	-	-	-	-	-	-
2019	5	-	2	2	-	2	2	-	2	-	1	1	-	2	-	-	-	-	-	-	-	-	2	-	-	-	-	-	-	-	-	-	-	-	-	-	-
2020	6	-	-	4	-	-	2	3	-	-	-	-	-	1	-	-	-	-	-	1	1	1	2	-	-	-	-	-	-	-	-	-	-	-	-	-	-
2021	7	2	-	1	2	-	2	1	2	1	-	1	-	-	-	-	-	-	1	-	1	-	-	-	-	-	-	-	-	-	-	-	-	-	-	-	-
2022	5	2	-	3	-	1	1	3	1	3	-	-	-	-	-	-	-	-	-	-	-	1	-	-	-	-	-	-	-	-	-	-	-	-	-	-	1
2023	4	2	-	1	-	3	2	1	2	-	-	1	2	1	-	-	-	-	1	1	-	-	-	-	-	-	-	-	-	-	-	-	-	-	-	-	-
2024	5	3	1	3	-	1	-	-	-	1	-	-	-	6	-	-	-	-	-	-	-	-	1	-	-	-	-	-	-	-	-	-	-	-	-	-	-
TOTAL	1302	171	112	80	57	44	42	37	34	33	25	17	15	15	13	12	9	9	9	7	6	6	6	5	4	4	3	3	2	2	2	1	1	1	1	1	1
	(Italy)	(Belgium)	(Spain)	(France)	(Switzerland)	(Germany)	(Australia)	(United Kingdom)	(Colombia)	(Netherlands)	(Russia)	(United States)	(Denmark)	(Slovenia)	(Norway)	(Luxembourg)	(Ukraine)	(Sweden)	(Republic of Ireland)	(Portugal)	(Slovakia)	(Czech Republic)	(Ecuador)	(Poland)	(Venezuela)	(Belarus)	(Mexico)	(Lithuania)	(Soviet Union)	(Latvia)	(Argentina)	(South Africa)	(Uzbekistan)	(Costa Rica)	(Estonia)	(Austria)	(Eritrea)

== Country visits ==
The following countries have hosted stages in the post-war era. Pre-WW2 has been excluded due to changing national borders, the route being less varied than today and, usually taking place entirely within Italy anyway. Countries hosting a Grande Depart are denoted with an asterisk* whilst countries the race route passed through without hosting a start or a finish are marked with brackets.

The years of 1946, 1948, 1960, 1967, 1970, 1975, 1976, 1978, 1980, 1981, 1983, 1984, 1986, 1991, 1992, 1993, 1999, 2003, 2005, 2020, 2024 are absent from below as they all took place entirely within Italian borders.

- Switzerland - 26 times - (1947), (1950), 1951, (1952), 1954, (1957), (1959), 1963, 1965, (1968), (1972), 1973, (1974), (1985), 1989, 1995, 1996, 1998, (2006), 2008, (2009), (2010), 2015, (2017), (2021), 2023
- San Marino - 24 times - (1950), 1951, (1953), (1954), (1955), 1956, 1958, 1959, (1962), 1964, 1965*, 1968, 1969, (1974), (1977), 1979, (1985), 1987, 1997, 1998, (2004), (2006), (2008), 2019
- France - 17 times - (1949), 1955, (1959), (1961), (1964), (1966), 1973, 1982, 1994, 1995, 1996, 1998*, 2000, 2002, 2007, 2013, 2016
- Slovenia - 8 times - 1971, 1994, 2001, (2004), 2011, (2021), (2022), 2025
- Austria - 7 times - 1971, 1988, 1990, 1994, 2006, 2007, 2009
- Netherlands - 4 times - (1973), 2002*, 2010*, 2016*
- Vatican City - 3 times - (1953), 1974*, (2025)
- Belgium - 3 times - 1973*, 2002, 2006*
- Monaco - 2 times - (1955), 1966*
- Germany - 2 times - 1973, 2002
- Luxembourg - 2 times - 1973, 2002
- Greece - 1 time - 1996*
- Croatia - 1 time - 2004
- Denmark - 1 time - 2012*
- United Kingdom - 1 time - 2014*
- Ireland - 1 time - 2014
- Israel - 1 time - 2018*
- Hungary - 1 time - 2022*
- Albania - 1 time - 2025*
- Bulgaria - 1 time - 2026*

== See also ==
- Yellow jersey statistics (for a similar list of leaders in the Tour de France)
- Vuelta a España statistics (for a similar list of leaders in the Vuelta a España)
