= 1938 Giro d'Italia =

Race details
- Dates: May 7–29, 1938
- Stages: 18, including three split stages
- Distance: 3,645.8 km (2,265 mi)
- Winning time: 112h 49' 28"

Results
Jersey awarded to the overall winner	Winner	Giovanni Valetti (ITA)	(Fréjus)
	Second	Ezio Cecchi (ITA)	(Gloria)
	Third	Severino Canavesi (ITA)	(Gloria)
	Mountains	Giovanni Valetti (ITA)	(Fréjus)
	Team	Gloria - Ambrosiana	

The 1938 Giro d'Italia was the 26th edition of the Giro d'Italia, organized and sponsored by the newspaper La Gazzetta dello Sport. The race began on 7 May in Milan with a stage that stretched 182 km (113 mi) to Turin, finishing back in Milan on 29 May after a split stage and a total distance covered of 3,645.8 km (2,265 mi). The race was won by the Italian rider Giovanni Valetti of the Fréjus team, with fellow Italians Ezio Cecchi and Severino Canavesi coming in second and third respectively.

== Participants ==
Of the 94 riders that began the Giro d'Italia on 7 May, 50 of them made it to the finish in Milan on 29 May. Riders were allowed to ride as a member of a team or group; 61 riders competed as part of a team, while the remaining 33 competed as a part of a group. The nine teams that partook in the race were: Bianchi, Dei, Fréjus, Ganna, Gloria-Ambrosiana, Lygie-Settebello, Legnano, Olympia, and Wolsit-Binda. The teams ranged from six to eight riders each. There were also seven groups, made up of three to five riders each, that participated in the race. Those groups were: U. C. Modenese, Il Littoriale, La Voce di Mantova, U.S. Azzini, U.S. Canelli, Dopolavoro Mater, and Gruppo A.

The peloton was composed primarily of Italian riders. The field featured one former Giro d'Italia winners with Francesco Camusso who won the race in 1931. Reigning champion Gino Bartali did not enter the race because the Italian government ordered him to race the Tour de France instead. Other notable Italian riders included Olimpio Bizzi, Giovanni Valetti, Ezio Cecchi, and Giuseppe Olmo. Swiss rider Leo Amberg who placed high at the 1936 and 1937 Tours de France competed in the race.

== Race summary ==
The first stage ended in a bunch sprint, won by Marco Cimatti, who became the first leader of the general classification. In the second stage, several groups of riders escaped and beat the peloton by many minutes. The first group consisted of five riders: Mario Vicini, Cesare Del Cancia, Severino Canavesi, Ruggero Balli and Adriano Vignoli, who finished the stage in that order. Vicini also took the lead in the general classification.

In the third stage, another group escaped, but although they stayed away until the finish, they did not win enough time to take over the lead of the general classification. The five riders that were in the leading group of stage two were still on top, but Del Cancia claimed the lead due to a better position in the stage.

The fourth stage was split into two parts. In the first part, Valetti left the rest behind on the Bracco, continued his solo to won the stage, climbing to eighth place; he only had riders in front of him that were part of the big escape in stage two.

The seventh stage was also split into two parts. The first part was an individual mountain time trial to the Monte Terminillo , won by Valetti. He jumped to fourth place in the general classification, while Del Cancia was still in the pink jersey.

In the ninth stage, Valetti escaped together with Giordano Cottur, and they won almost five minutes on all the other riders. Cottur won the stage, while took the lead in the general classification.

Valetti showed that he was the best climber by coming over the Pian delle Fugazze first, and continuing alone until the finish, winning by more than two minutes.

In the last stages, Valetti increased his lead to almost nine minutes, and became the winner of the 1938 Giro d'Italia.

== Route and stages ==
Stage results
Stage	Date	Course	Distance	Type (Note: In 1938, there was no distinction in the rules between plain stages and mountain stages; the icons shown here indicate that the stages 2, 4a, 9, 14, 15, 16, 18a, and 18b included major mountains. The stage 7a individual time trial also contained a summit finish.)	Winner
1	May 7	Milan to Turin	182 km (113 mi)	Plain stage	Marco Cimatti (ITA)
2	May 8	Turin to Sanremo	204 km (127 mi)	Stage with mountain(s)	Mario Vicini (ITA)
3	May 9	Sanremo to Santa Margherita Ligure	172 km (107 mi)	Plain stage	Giovanni Gotti (ITA)
4a	May 10	Santa Margherita Ligure to La Spezia	81 km (50 mi)	Stage with mountain(s)	Giovanni Valetti (ITA)
4b	May 10	La Spezia to Montecatini Terme	110 km (68 mi)	Plain stage	Walter Generati (ITA)
	May 11	Rest day			
5	May 12	Montecatini Terme to Chianciano Terme	184 km (114 mi)	Plain stage	Salvatore Crippa (ITA)
6	May 13	Chianciano Terme to Rieti	160 km (99 mi)	Plain stage	Adolfo Leoni (ITA)
7a	May 14	Rieti to Monte Terminillo	19.8 km (12 mi)	Individual time trial	Giovanni Valetti (ITA)
7b	May 14	Rieti to Rome	152 km (94 mi)	Plain stage	Cino Cinelli (ITA)
8	May 15	Rome to Naples	234 km (145 mi)	Plain stage	Raffaele Di Paco (ITA)
	May 16	Rest day			
9	May 17	Naples to Lanciano	221 km (137 mi)	Stage with mountain(s)	Giordano Cottur (ITA)
10	May 18	Lanciano to Ascoli Piceno	149 km (93 mi)	Plain stage	Raffaele Di Paco (ITA)
11	May 19	Ascoli Piceno to Ravenna	268 km (167 mi)	Plain stage	Cino Cinelli (ITA)
12	May 20	Ravenna to Treviso	199 km (124 mi)	Plain stage	Raffaele Di Paco (ITA)
	May 21	Rest day			
13	May 22	Treviso to Trieste	207 km (129 mi)	Plain stage	Cesare Del Cancia (ITA)
14	May 23	Trieste to Belluno	243 km (151 mi)	Stage with mountain(s)	Olimpio Bizzi (ITA)
	May 24	Rest day			
15	May 25	Belluno to Recoaro Terme	154 km (96 mi)	Stage with mountain(s)	Giovanni Valetti (ITA)
	May 26	Rest day			
16	May 27	Recoaro Terme to Bergamo	272 km (169 mi)	Stage with mountain(s)	Diego Marabelli (ITA)
17	May 28	Bergamo to Varese	154 km (96 mi)	Plain stage	Cesare Del Cancia (ITA)
18a	May 29	Varese to Locarno	100 km (62 mi)	Stage with mountain(s)	Leo Amberg (SUI)
18b	May 29	Locarno to Milan	180 km (112 mi)	Stage with mountain(s)	Olimpio Bizzi (ITA)
	Total		3,645.8 km (2,265 mi)		

== Classification leadership ==
The leader of the general classification – calculated by adding the stage finish times of each rider – wore a pink jersey. This classification is the most important of the race, and its winner is considered as the winner of the Giro.

There was a special classification for the grouped riders, calculated in the same way as the general classification. The leader of this classification was given the white jersey.

In the mountains classification, the race organizers selected different mountains that the route crossed and awarded points to the five riders who crossed them first.

The winner of the team classification was determined by adding the finish times of the best three cyclists per team together and the team with the lowest total time was the winner. If a team had fewer than three riders finish, they were not eligible for the classification. The group classification was decided in the same manner, but the classification was exclusive to the competing groups.

The rows in the following table correspond to the jerseys awarded after that stage was run.

Stage	Winner	General classification	Best grouped rider	Mountains classification	Team classification	Group classification
1	Marco Cimatti	Marco Cimatti	Edoardo Molinar	not awarded	Bianchi	Il Littoriale
2	Mario Vicini	Mario Vicini	Settimo Simonini	Mario Vicini	Bianchi	U.S. Canelli
3	Giovanni Gotti	Cesare Del Cancia	Settimo Simonini	Mario Vicini	Bianchi	Il Littoriale
4a	Giovanni Valetti	Cesare Del Cancia	Settimo Simonini	Mario Vicini	Bianchi	Dopolavoro Mater
4b	Walter Generati	Cesare Del Cancia	Settimo Simonini	Mario Vicini	Bianchi	Dopolavoro Mater
5	Salvatore Crippa	Cesare Del Cancia	Michele Benente	Giovanni Valetti	Bianchi	U.S. Canelli
6	Adolfo Leoni	Cesare Del Cancia	Michele Benente	Giovanni Valetti	Bianchi	Il Littoriale
7a	Giovanni Valetti	Cesare Del Cancia	Michele Benente	Giovanni Valetti	Bianchi	Il Littoriale
7b	Cino Cinelli	Cesare Del Cancia	Michele Benente	Giovanni Valetti	Bianchi	Il Littoriale
8	Raffaele Di Paco	Cesare Del Cancia	Michele Benente	Giovanni Valetti	Bianchi	Il Littoriale
9	Giordano Cottur	Giovanni Valetti	Michele Benente	Giovanni Valetti	Fréjus	Dopolavoro Mater
10	Raffaele Di Paco	Giovanni Valetti	Michele Benente	Giovanni Valetti	Fréjus	Il Littoriale
11	Cino Cinelli	Giovanni Valetti	Michele Benente	Giovanni Valetti	Fréjus	Il Littoriale
12	Raffaele Di Paco	Giovanni Valetti	Michele Benente	Giovanni Valetti	Fréjus	U.S. Canelli
13	Cesare Del Cancia	Giovanni Valetti	Michele Benente	Giovanni Valetti	Bianchi	U.S. Canelli
14	Olimpio Bizzi	Giovanni Valetti	Michele Benente	Giovanni Valetti	Bianchi	U.S. Canelli
15	Giovanni Valetti	Giovanni Valetti	Settimo Simonini	Giovanni Valetti	Gloria-Ambrosiana	U.S. Canelli
16	Diego Marabelli	Giovanni Valetti	Settimo Simonini	Giovanni Valetti	Gloria-Ambrosiana	U.S. Canelli
17	Cesare Del Cancia	Giovanni Valetti	Settimo Simonini	Giovanni Valetti	Gloria-Ambrosiana	U.S. Canelli
18a	Leo Amberg	Giovanni Valetti	Settimo Simonini	Giovanni Valetti	Gloria-Ambrosiana	U.S. Canelli
18b	Olimpio Bizzi	Giovanni Valetti	Settimo Simonini	Giovanni Valetti	Gloria-Ambrosiana	U.S. Canelli
Final		Giovanni Valetti	Settimo Simonini	Giovanni Valetti	Gloria-Ambrosiana	U.S. Canelli

== Final standings ==
Legend
Pink jersey	Denotes the winner of the General classification	White jersey	Denotes the best grouped rider

=== General classification ===
Final general classification (1–10)
Rank	Name	Team	Time
1	Giovanni Valetti (ITA)	Fréjus	112h 49' 28"
2	Ezio Cecchi (ITA)	Gloria	+ 8' 52"
3	Severino Canavesi (ITA)	Gloria	+ 9' 06"
4	Settimo Simonini (ITA)	U.S. Canelli	+ 15' 50"
5	Michele Benente (ITA)	U.S. Canelli	+ 19' 40"
6	Walter Generati (ITA)	Bianchi	+ 22' 02"
7	Cesare Del Cancia (ITA)	Ganna	+ 24' 07"
8	Karl Litschi (SUI)	Olympia	+ 29' 24"
9	Ruggero Balli (ITA)	Bianchi	+ 32' 23"
10	Adalino Mealli (ITA)	Wolsit	+ 38' 38"

=== Grouped rider classification ===
Final grouped rider classification (1–10)
Rank	Name	Team	Time
1	Settimo Simonini (ITA)	U.S. Canelli	113h 05' 17"
2	Michele Benente (ITA)	U.S. Canelli	+ 3' 57"
3	Richard Menapace (ITA)	Dopolavoro Mater	+ 1h 04' 56"
4	Remo Cerasa (ITA)	Il Littoriale	+ 2h 05' 29"
5	Zoarino Guidi (ITA)	Il Littoriale	+ 2h 08' 03"
6	Edgardo Scappini (ITA)	U.S. Azzini	+ 2h 09' 54"
7	Fulvio Montini (ITA)	U.S. Azzini	+ 2h 17' 17"
8	Ascanio Arcangeli (ITA)	Il Littoriale	+ 2h 42' 08"
9	Gilberto De Paolis (ITA)	Dopolavoro Mater	+ 2h 43' 12"
10	Walter Fantini (ITA)	U.C. Modenese	+ 3h 15' 28"

=== Mountains classification ===
Final mountains classification (1–8)
	Name	Team	Points
1	Giovanni Valetti (ITA)	Fréjus	29
2	Giordano Cottur (ITA)	Lygie	26
3	Ezio Cecchi (ITA)	Gloria	18
4	Settimo Simonini (ITA)	U.S. Canelli	13
5	Karl Litschi (SUI)	Olympia	9
5	Adalino Mealli (ITA)	Wolsit	9
7	Severino Canavesi (ITA)	Gloria	8
8	Bernardo Rogora (ITA)	Gloria	5
8	Michele Benente (ITA)	U.S. Canelli	5
8	Olimpio Bizzi (ITA)	Fréjus	5

=== Team classification ===
Final team classification (1–7)
	Team	Time
1	Gloria-Ambrosiana	340h 5' 28"
2	Bianchi	+ 3' 06"
3	Fréjus	+ 51' 18"
4	Ganna	+ 1h 49' 00"
5	Wolsit-S.C. Binda	+ 4h 22' 32"
6	Dei	+ 5h 15' 52"
7	Olympia	+ 9h 11' 44"

=== Group classification ===
Final group classification (1–3)
Rank	Team	Time
1	U.S. Canelli	243h 17' 44"
2	Il Littoriale	+ 2h 53' 47"
3	Dopolavoro Mater	+ 3h 36' 32"
