= 1938 Tour de Suisse =

Race details
- Dates: 6–14 August 1938
- Stages: 8
- Distance: 1,683 km (1,046 mi)
- Winning time: 48h 12' 16"

Results
	Winner	Giovanni Valetti (ITA)
	Second	Arsène Mersch (LUX)
	Third	Severino Canavesi (ITA)

The 1938 Tour de Suisse was the sixth edition of the Tour de Suisse cycle race and was held from 6 August to 14 August 1938. The race started and finished in Bern. The race was won by Giovanni Valetti.

== General classification ==
Final general classification

Rank	Rider	Time
1	Giovanni Valetti (ITA)	48h 12' 16"
2	Arsène Mersch (LUX)	+ 12' 44"
3	Severino Canavesi (ITA)	+ 16' 20"
4	Werner Buchwalder (SUI)	+ 17' 07"
5	Leo Amberg (SUI)	+ 18' 10"
6	Robert Zimmermann (SUI)	+ 20' 07"
7	Cesare Del Cancia (ITA)	+ 20' 58"
8	Ezio Cecchi (ITA)	+ 26' 39"
9	Albert Hendrickx (BEL)	+ 33' 26"
10	Edgar Buchwalder (SUI)	+ 34' 29"
