= Giuseppe Olivieri =

Giuseppe Olivieri may refer to:

- Giuseppe Olivieri (composer) (fl. 1617 – c. 1623), Italian composer and poet
- Giuseppe Olivieri (racing cyclist) (1889–1973), Italian racing cyclist
