= 1934 Volta a Catalunya =

Race details
- Dates: 16–24 June 1934
- Stages: 10
- Distance: 1,358 km (843.8 mi)
- Winning time: 45h 33' 07"

Results
	Winner	Bernardo Rogora (ITA)
	Second	Alfons Deloor (BEL)
	Third	Nino Sella (ITA)

The 1934 Volta a Catalunya was the 16th edition of the Volta a Catalunya cycle race and was held from 16 June to 24 June 1934. The race started and finished in Barcelona. The race was won by Bernardo Rogora.

== Route and stages ==
List of stages
Stage	Date	Course	Distance	Winner
1	16 June	Barcelona to Manresa	89 km (55 mi)	Isidro Figueras (ESP)
2	17 June	Manresa to Reus	155 km (96 mi)	Alfons Deloor (BEL)
3	18 June	Reus to Valls	111 km (69 mi)	Mariano Cañardo (ESP)
4	19 June	Valls to Lleida	146 km (91 mi)	Roger Chene (FRA)
5	20 June	Lleida to Andorra la Vella (Andorra)	163 km (101 mi)	Bernardo Rogora (ITA)
6	21 June	Andorra la Vella (Andorra) to La Bisbal d'Empordà	259 km (161 mi)	Antonio Sella (ITA)
7	22 June	La Bisbal d'Empordà to Girona (ITT)	55 km (34 mi)	Antonio Sella (ITA)
8	22 June	Girona to Figueres	118 km (73 mi)	Bernardo Rogora (ITA)
9	23 June	Figueres to Terrassa	168 km (104 mi)	José Nicolau (ESP)
10	24 June	Terrassa to Barcelona	83 km (52 mi)	Antonio Escuriet (ESP)
	Total		1,347 km (837 mi)	

== General classification ==
Final general classification

Rank	Rider	Time
1	Bernardo Rogora (ITA)	45h 33' 07"
2	Alfons Deloor (BEL)	+ 9' 06"
3	Nino Sella (ITA)	+ 9' 58"
4	Mariano Cañardo (ESP)	+ 12' 42"
5	Antoine Dignef (BEL)	+ 18' 26"
6	Juan Gimeno (ESP)	+ 22' 59"
7	Carlo Romanatti (ITA)	+ 25' 15"
8	Antonio Escuriet (ESP)	+ 29' 12"
9	Michel Catteeuw (BEL)	+ 33' 08"
10	Gustaaf Deloor (BEL)	+ 34' 03"
