= Cimatti =

Historical motorcycle manufacturer

Cimatti Enrico
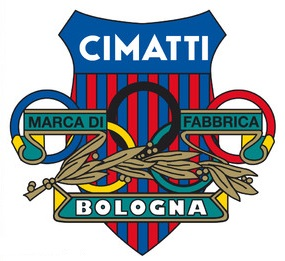
- Formerly: Ditta Cimatti
- Company type: Joint-stock company
- Industry: Motorcycle manufacturing
- Founded: 1937
- Founder: Marco Cimatti
- Defunct: 1984
- Fate: Closed due to recession
- Headquarters: Pioppe di Salvaro, Italy
- Products: Motorcycles

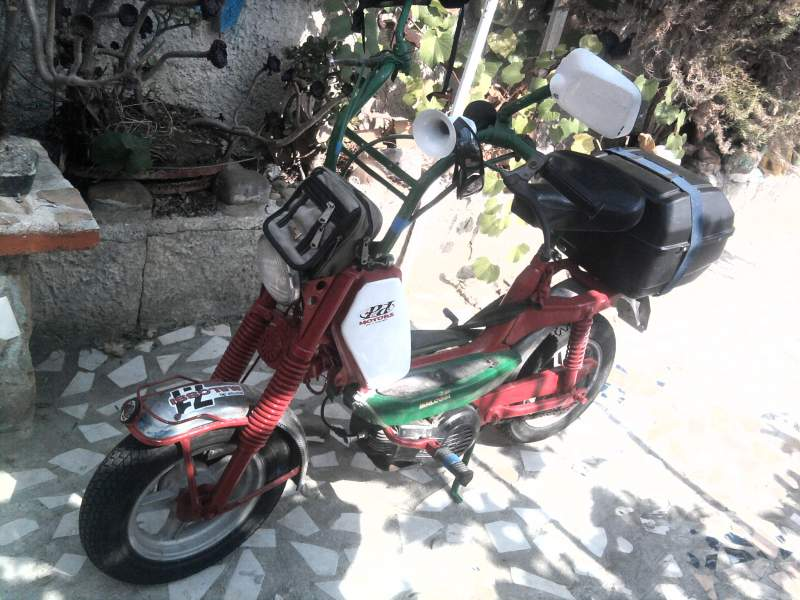
Cimatti Mini Chic 50 cc moped

Cimatti was an Italian manufacturer of bicycles, motorcycles and mopeds active between 1937 and 1984.

In 1937, the Olympic cyclist Marco Cimatti founded a small company in Bologna that originally produced bicycles. In 1950, he changed to mopeds, and in the 1960s, started producing motorcycles, including the 100 cc (6.1 cu in) and 175 cc (10.7 cu in) Sport Luxury road and Kaiman Cross racing models with four-speed gearboxes. In 1972–77, he introduced two 125 cc (7.6 cu in) models, one for motocross with a five-speed gearbox and the other for road. In those years Cimatti's son Enrico expanded the business to export motorcycles to the United States, France, Norway and Tunisia. In the 1970s through early 1980s, Cimatti produced several moped lines including the City-Bike and the larger Town-Bike. Cimatti used two-stroke engines bought from both Moto Morini and Moto Minarelli. A recession in the early 1980s forced the company to close in 1984.
