= 1919 Milan–San Remo =

Race details
- Dates: 6 April 1919
- Stages: 1
- Distance: 286.5 km (178.0 mi)
- Winning time: 11h 26' 00"

Results
	Winner	Angelo Gremo (ITA)
	Second	Costante Girardengo (ITA)
	Third	Giuseppe Olivieri (ITA)

The 1919 Milan–San Remo was the 12th edition of the Milan–San Remo cycle race and was held on 6 April 1919. The race started in Milan and finished in San Remo. The race was won by Angelo Gremo.

== General classification ==
Final general classification

Rank	Rider	Time
1	Angelo Gremo (ITA)	11h 26' 00"
2	Costante Girardengo (ITA)	+ 2' 15"
3	Giuseppe Olivieri (ITA)	+ 8' 00"
4	Giuseppe Azzini (ITA)	+ 8' 00"
5	Carlo Galetti (ITA)	+ 25' 00"
6	Mario Santagostino (ITA)	+ 25' 30"
7	Luigi Lucotti (ITA)	+ 30' 00"
8	Clemente Canepari (ITA)	+ 30' 50"
9	Giovanni Rossignoli (ITA)	+ 38' 30"
10	Lucien Buysse (BEL)	+ 41' 30"
