= 1920 Giro d'Italia =

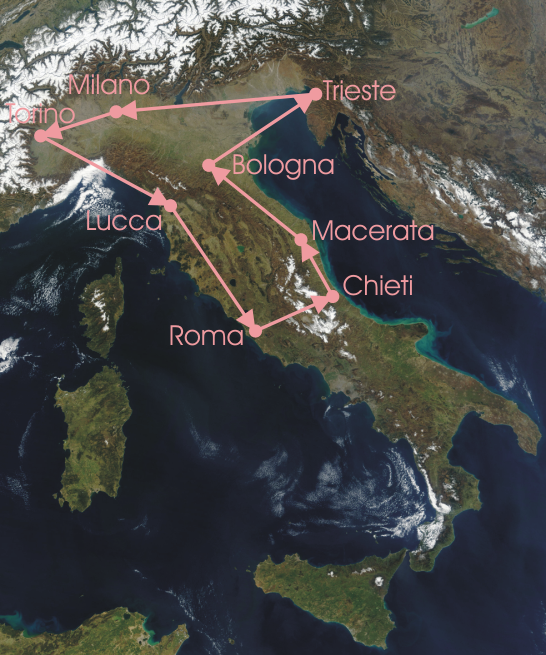
- Race Route

Race details
- Dates: 23 May – 6 June 1920
- Stages: 8
- Distance: 2,632 km (1,635 mi)
- Winning time: 102h 44' 33"

Results
	Winner	Gaetano Belloni (ITA)	(Bianchi)
	Second	Angelo Gremo (ITA)	(Bianchi)
	Third	Jean Alavoine (FRA)	(Bianchi)
	Team	Bianchi	

The 1920 Giro d'Italia was the eighth edition of the Giro d'Italia, a Grand Tour organized and sponsored by the newspaper La Gazzetta dello Sport. The race began on 23 May in Milan with a stage that stretched 348 km (216 mi) to Turin, finishing back in Milan on 6 June after a 421 km (262 mi) stage and a total distance covered of 2,632 km (1,635 mi). The race was won by the Italian rider Gaetano Belloni of the Bianchi team. Second and third respectively were Italian Angelo Gremo and Frenchman Jean Alavoine.

Of the 49 riders who started the race only 10 crossed the finish line in Milan.

== Participants ==
Of the 49 riders that began the Giro d'Italia on 23 May, ten of them made it to the finish in Milan on 6 June. Riders were allowed to ride on their own or as a member of a team. There were three teams that competed in the race: Bianchi-Pirelli, Legnano-Pirelli, and Stucchi-Pirelli.

The peloton was almost completely composed of Italians. The field featured two former Giro d'Italia champions in the three-time winner Carlo Galetti and returning champion Costante Girardengo. Other notable Italian riders that started the race included Angelo Gremo, Giovanni Gerbi, and Giovanni Rossignoli. Frenchman Jean Alavoine who had some high placings in the Tour de France, along with the successful Belgian cyclist Marcel Buysse started the race.

== Events ==
The first stage was won by Giuseppe Oliveri, who beat his two teammate Gremo and Belloni in a sprint, having distanced the rest of the field by more than ten minutes. In that stage, the defending champion Costante Girardengo had an accident, which made him lose time. Gerbi was disqualified for being pulled by a car, but after protests by fans he was allowed to continue. This stage was the first stage in the history of the Giro that was not fully run in Italy, going through Switzerland before finishing in Italy.

In the second stage, Oliveri and Girardengo both abandoned. Belloni won the second stage, and became the new leader in the race. Belloni also won the third stage; Girardengo's team had left the race at that point.

In the fourth stage, Alavoine attacked, and won by more than half an hour.

In the fifth stage, Alavoine sprinted to the victory, but second-placed Torricelli complained to the jury. The jury accepted Torricelli's complaints, and Torricelli became the winner of the stage. The Legnano team did not think that this penalty was sufficient, and left the race. This meant that only the Bianchi-Pirelli team was left in the race, together with some isolated riders. Commenters said that this Giro had been sick since the second stage, but that it was dead after the fifth stage. In that fifth stage, Belloni lost time, and Gremo became the new leader.

The seventh stage was the deciding stage: Belloni won much time on his competitors.

In the last stage, there were only ten riders left. They stayed together for most of the stage. Near the end, Schierano was left behind, and the nine other riders rode to the finish together, in the hippodrome Trotter in Via Padova, Turin. When they reached the hippodrome, they were sent to the wrong entrance. Schierano, coming slightly later, used the correct entrance, and he reached the finish first. Initially, the jury said that Schierano won the stage, and that all other riders were ex aequo in second place, but later the jury decided to nullify the results. Times taken at the entrance of the velodrome were used for the general classification, and stage prizes were shared among all riders.

== Final standings ==
=== Stage results ===
Stage results
Stage	Date	Course	Distance	Type (Note: In 1920, there was no distinction in the rules between plain stages and mountain stages; the icons shown here indicate that the first, second, third, fourth, and fifth stages included major mountains.)	Winner	Race Leader
1	23 May	Milan to Turin	348 km (216 mi)	Stage with mountain(s)	Giuseppe Olivieri (ITA)	Giuseppe Olivieri (ITA)
2	25 May	Turin to Lucca	378 km (235 mi)	Stage with mountain(s)	Gaetano Belloni (ITA)	Gaetano Belloni (ITA)
3	27 May	Lucca to Rome	386 km (240 mi)	Stage with mountain(s)	Gaetano Belloni (ITA)	Gaetano Belloni (ITA)
4	29 May	Rome to Chieti	234 km (145 mi)	Stage with mountain(s)	Jean Alavoine (FRA)	Gaetano Belloni (ITA)
5	31 May	Chieti to Macerata	236 km (147 mi)	Stage with mountain(s)	Leopoldo Torricelli (ITA)	Angelo Gremo (ITA)
6	2 June	Macerata to Bologna	282 km (175 mi)	Plain stage	Jean Alavoine (FRA)	Angelo Gremo (ITA)
7	4 June	Bologna to Trieste	349 km (217 mi)	Plain stage	Gaetano Belloni (ITA)	Gaetano Belloni (ITA)
8	6 June	Trieste to Milan	421 km (262 mi)	Plain stage	9 riders tied (Note: In stage 8, the sprint was disrupted when a horse got on the track, and all nine cyclists in the first group were declared winner. These nine cyclists were, in alphabetical order: Ugo Agostoni, Jean Alavoine, Gaetano Belloni, Marcel Buysse, Nicola Di Biase, Angelo Gremo, Emilio Petiva, Giovanni Rossignoli, & Enrico Sala.)	Gaetano Belloni (ITA)
	Total		2,632 km (1,635 mi)			

=== General classification ===
There were ten cyclists who had completed all ten stages. For these cyclists, the times they had needed in each stage was added up for the general classification. The cyclist with the least accumulated time was the winner. Emilio Petiva won the prize for best ranked independent rider in the general classification.

Final general classification (1–10)
Rank	Name	Team	Time
1	Gaetano Belloni (ITA)	Bianchi	102h 44' 33"
2	Angelo Gremo (ITA)	Bianchi	+ 32' 24"
3	Jean Alavoine (FRA)	Bianchi	+ 1h 01' 14"
4	Emilio Petiva (ITA)	—	+ 3h 02' 44"
5	Domenico Schierano (ITA)	—	+ 3h 36' 20"
6	Marcel Buysse (BEL)	Bianchi	+ 3h 52' 49"
7	Ugo Agostoni (ITA)	Bianchi	+ 4h 17' 35"
8	Enrico Sala (ITA)	—	+ 4h 43' 28"
9	Giovanni Rossignoli (ITA)	—	+ 5h 54' 47"
10	Nicola Di Biase (ITA)	—	+ 6h 03' 16"
