= Giovanni Valetti =

Italian cyclist

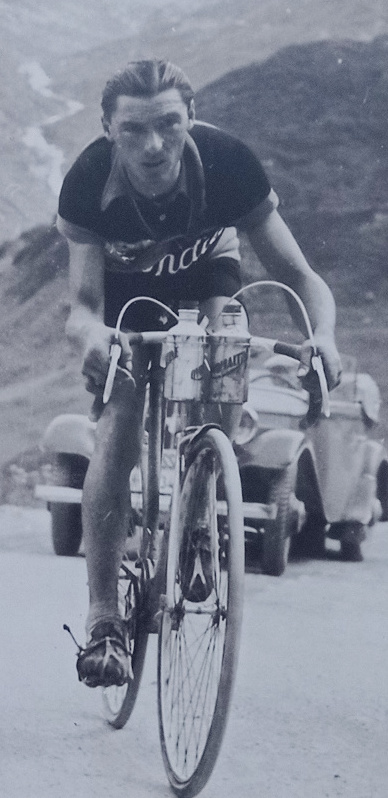

Personal information
- Full name: Giovanni Valetti
- Born: 22 September 1913 Vinovo, Italy
- Died: 28 May 1998 (aged 84) Avigliana, Italy

Cycling career
- Sport: Cycling
- Discipline: Road
- Role: Rider

Professional teams
- 1935: Individual
- 1936–1938: Fréjus
- 1939: Fréjus/France Sport-Wolber
- 1940: Bianchi
- 1941: Olmo/Olympia
- 1942–1943: Olmo
- 1944: Individual
- 1945: Fréjus
- 1946–1948: Individual

Major wins
- Grand Tours Giro d'Italia General classification (1938, 1939) Mountains classification (1938) 7 individual stages (1937, 1938, 1939) Stage races Tour de Suisse (1938)

Giovanni Valetti (22 September 1913 – 28 May 1998) was an Italian professional road racing cyclist. The highlights of his career were his two overall wins in the 1938 and 1939 Giro d'Italia. He also won the 1938 Tour de Suisse.

== Major results ==
1933
1st Overall Giro del Lazio

1st Stage 3

5th Overall Gran Piemonte
1936
5th Overall Giro d'Italia
1937
2nd Overall Giro d'Italia

1st Stage 3

3rd Giro di Toscana
1938
1st Overall Giro d'Italia

1st Mountains classification
1st Stages 4a, 7a (ITT) & 15

1st Overall Tour de Suisse

1st Stages 3 & 4

5th Grand Prix des Nations
1939
1st Overall Giro d'Italia

1st Stages 6b (ITT), 13 (ITT) & 16

2nd Giro della Provincia Milano
1940
10th Giro di Lombardia
1941
8th Giro di Toscana
1942
10th Giro del Veneto
1943
3rd Giro della Provincia Milano

=== Grand Tour general classification results timeline ===
Grand Tour	1936	1937	1938	1939	1940
Giro d'Italia	5	2	1	1	17
Tour de France	—	DNF	—	—	—
Vuelta a España	—	—	—	—	—

Legend
—	Did not compete
DNF	Did not finish
