= Quirico Bernacchi =

Italian cyclist

Personal information
- Born: 31 August 1914 Pescia, Italy
- Died: 29 March 2006 (aged 91)

Cycling career
- Sport: Cycling
- Role: Rider

Quirico Bernacchi (31 August 1914 – 29 March 2006) was an Italian racing cyclist. He won stage 2 of the 1937 Giro d'Italia.
