= 1937 Giro d'Italia =

Race details
- Dates: 8–30 May 1937
- Stages: 19, including four split stages
- Distance: 3,840 km (2,386 mi)
- Winning time: 112h 49' 28"

Results
Jersey awarded to the overall winner	Winner	Gino Bartali (ITA)	(Legnano)
	Second	Giovanni Valetti (ITA)	(Fréjus)
	Third	Enrico Mollo (ITA)	(Fréjus)
	Mountains	Gino Bartali (ITA)	(Legnano)
	Team	Fréjus	

The 1937 Giro d'Italia was the 25th edition of the Giro d'Italia, organized and sponsored by the newspaper La Gazzetta dello Sport. The race began on 8 May in Milan with a stage that stretched 165 km (103 mi) to Turin, finishing back in Milan on 30 May after a split stage and a total distance covered of 3,840 km (2,386 mi). The race was won by Gino Bartali of the Legnano team, with fellow Italians Giovanni Valetti and Enrico Mollo coming in second and third respectively.

== Participants ==
Of the 98 riders that began the Giro d'Italia on 8 May, 41 of them made it to the finish in Milan on 30 May. Riders were allowed to ride on their own or as a member of a team or group; 65riders competed as part of a team, while the remaining 33 competed independently. The four teams that partook in the race were: Bianchi, Fréjus, Ganna, and Legnano. Each team was composed of seven riders. There were also seven groups, made up of five riders each, that participated in the race. Those groups were: Italiani All'Estero, Bertoldo, Il Littoriale, S S. Parioli, Belgi, Svizzeri, and Tedeschi.

The peloton was composed primarily of Italian riders. The field featured four former Giro d'Italia winners with the 1931 race winner Francesco Camusso, 1934 winner Learco Guerra, Vasco Bergamaschi who won the race in 1935, and returning champion Gino Bartali. Other notable Italian riders included Olimpio Bizzi, Giovanni Valetti, and Giuseppe Olmo. Notable foreign entrants were the Belgian riders Alfons Deloor, Alfons Schepers, and Antoine Dignef, and also the Swiss rider Leo Amberg who placed high at the 1936 Tour de France.

== Race summary ==
The first two stages were won by grouped riders Troggi and Bernacchi, and they also became the first leaders in the general classification. In the next stages, the Frejus team took control, and Valetti became the leader. After the fourth stage, Valetti was leading with two-and-a-half minute over Bizzi and bartali.

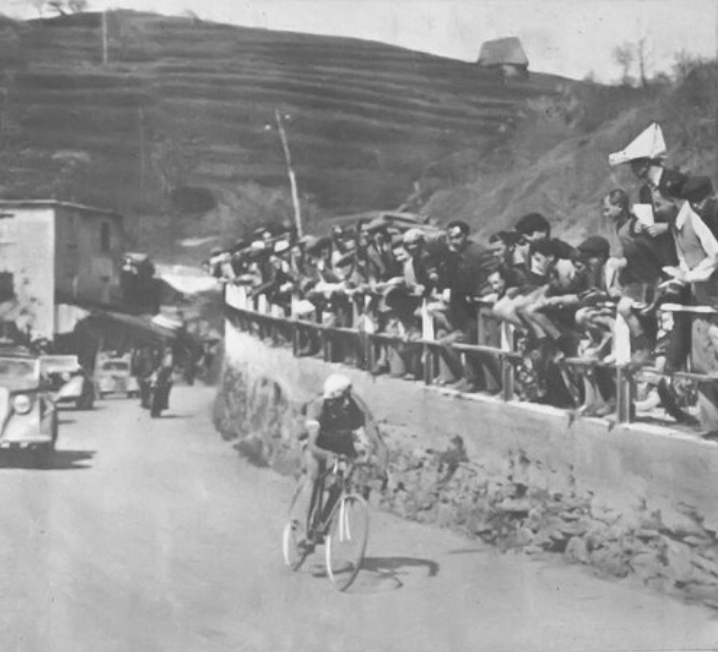
Mario Vicini in the third stage

Then came the team time trial, the first in Giro history. It was won by Bartali's team Legnano, and Bartali became the new leader. He lost some time in the second part of the stage later that day, and Valetti returned as race leader.

The eighth stage started with an individual mountain time trial. Bartali was the fastest rider, and took back the lead in the general classification. Valetti was 20 seconds behind, but the other riders were more than five minutes behind, so from then on Bartali and Valetti were the clear favourites for the overall victory.

Bartali was able to leave Valetti behind in the hilly stages, but lost some time when the peloton split and he was on the wrong side.

In the sixteenth stage, the Giro went to the Dolomites, the first time in Giro history. There, Bartali crushed the competition, finishing five minutes clear over all other riders. Bartali finished the Giro more than eight minutes ahead of Valetti, and thus for the second time became the winner of the Giro.

== Route and stages ==
The first part of the fifth stage was the first ever team time trial in the Giro d'Italia.

Stage results
Stage	Date	Course	Distance	Type (Note: In 1937, there was no distinction in the rules between plain stages and mountain stages; the icons shown here indicate that the stages 4, 8b, 10, 11a, 12, 16, 17, and 19b included major mountains. The stage 8a individual time trial also contained a summit finish.)	Winner
1	8 May	Milan to Turin	165 km (103 mi)	Plain stage	Nello Troggi (ITA)
2	9 May	Turin to Acqui Terme	148 km (92 mi)	Plain stage	Quirico Bernacchi (ITA)
3	10 May	Acqui Terme to Genoa	158 km (98 mi)	Plain stage	Giovanni Valetti (ITA)
4	11 May	Genoa to Viareggio	186 km (116 mi)	Stage with mountain(s)	Olimpio Bizzi (ITA)
5a	12 May	Viareggio to Marina di Massa	60 km (37 mi)	Team time trial	Legnano
5b	12 May	Marina di Massa to Livorno	114 km (71 mi)	Plain stage	Olimpio Bizzi (ITA)
	13 May	Rest day			
6	14 May	Livorno to Arezzo	190 km (118 mi)	Plain stage	Giuseppe Olmo (ITA)
7	15 May	Arezzo to Rieti	206 km (128 mi)	Plain stage	Marco Cimatti (ITA)
8a	16 May	Rieti to Monte Terminillo	20 km (12 mi)	Individual time trial	Gino Bartali (ITA)
8b	16 May	Rieti to Rome	152 km (94 mi)	Stage with mountain(s)	Raffaele Di Paco (ITA)
9	17 May	Rome to Naples	250 km (155 mi)	Plain stage	Learco Guerra (ITA)
	18 May	Rest day			
10	19 May	Naples to Foggia	166 km (103 mi)	Stage with mountain(s)	Gino Bartali (ITA)
11a	20 May	Foggia to San Severo	186 km (116 mi)	Stage with mountain(s)	Walter Generati (ITA)
11b	20 May	San Severo to Campobasso	105 km (65 mi)	Plain stage	Cesare Del Cancia (ITA)
12	21 May	Campobasso to Pescara	258 km (160 mi)	Stage with mountain(s)	Marco Cimatti (ITA)
13	22 May	Pescara to Ancona	194 km (121 mi)	Plain stage	Aldo Bini (ITA)
14	23 May	Ancona to Forlì	178 km (111 mi)	Plain stage	Aldo Bini (ITA)
	24 May	Rest day			
15	25 May	Forlì to Vittorio Veneto	266 km (165 mi)	Plain stage	Glauco Servadei (ITA)
16	26 May	Vittorio Veneto to Merano	227 km (141 mi)	Stage with mountain(s)	Gino Bartali (ITA)
17	27 May	Merano to Gardone Riviera	190 km (118 mi)	Stage with mountain(s)	Gino Bartali (ITA)
	28 May	Rest day			
18	29 May	Gardone Riviera to San Pellegrino Terme	129 km (80 mi)	Plain stage	Glauco Servadei (ITA)
19a	30 May	San Pellegrino Terme to Como	151 km (94 mi)	Plain stage	Marco Cimatti (ITA)
19b	30 May	Como to Milan	141 km (88 mi)	Stage with mountain(s)	Aldo Bini (ITA)
	Total		3,840 km (2,386 mi)		

== Classification leadership ==
The leader of the general classification – calculated by adding the stage finish times of each rider – wore a pink jersey. This classification is the most important of the race, and its winner is considered as the winner of the Giro.

The liberi (free rider) classification, one similar to the general classification was calculated, using only independent riders and riders that came as members of groups. The leader of this classification wore the white jersey.

In the mountains classification, the race organizers selected different mountains that the route crossed and awarded points to the riders who crossed them first.

The winner of the team classification was determined by adding the finish times of the best three cyclists per team together and the team with the lowest total time was the winner. If a rider from a team abandoned the race, he could be replaced by a rider who started the 1936 Giro as isolated rider. The group classification was decided in the same manner, but the classification was exclusive to the competing groups.

The rows in the following table correspond to the jerseys awarded after that stage was run.

Classification leadership table
Stage	Winner	General classification	Liberi classification	Mountains classification	Team classification	Group classification
1	Nello Troggi	Nello Troggi	Nello Troggi (Note: In stage 2, Troggi wore the pink jersey; nobody wore the white jersey.)	not awarded	Bianchi	Italiani all'Estero
2	Quirico Bernacchi	Quirico Bernacchi	Quirico Bernacchi (Note: In stage 3, Bernacchi wore the pink jersey; nobody wore the white jersey.)	not awarded	Fréjus	Bertoldo
3	Giovanni Valetti	Giovanni Valetti	Quirico Bernacchi	not awarded	Fréjus	Bertoldo
4	Olimpio Bizzi	Giovanni Valetti	Bernardo Rogora	Enrico Mollo	Fréjus	Bertoldo
5a	Legnano	Gino Bartali	Alfons Deloor	Enrico Mollo	Fréjus	Bertoldo
5b	Olimpio Bizzi	Giovanni Valetti	Luigi Barral	Enrico Mollo	Fréjus	Bertoldo
6	Giuseppe Olmo	Giovanni Valetti	Luigi Barral	Enrico Mollo	Fréjus	Bertoldo
7	Marco Cimatti	Giovanni Valetti	Luigi Barral	Enrico Mollo	Fréjus	Bertoldo
8a	Gino Bartali	Gino Bartali	Luigi Barral	Enrico Mollo & Gino Bartali	Fréjus	Bertoldo
8b	Raffaele Di Paco	Gino Bartali	Luigi Barral	Enrico Mollo	Fréjus	Bertoldo
9	Learco Guerra	Gino Bartali	Luigi Barral	Enrico Mollo	Fréjus	Bertoldo
10	Gino Bartali	Gino Bartali	Luigi Barral	Gino Bartali	Fréjus	Bertoldo
11a	Walter Generati	Gino Bartali	Luigi Barral	Gino Bartali	Fréjus	Bertoldo
11b	Cesare Del Cancia	Gino Bartali	Edoardo Molinar	Gino Bartali	Fréjus	Bertoldo
12	Marco Cimatti	Gino Bartali	Edoardo Molinar	Enrico Mollo & Luigi Barral	Fréjus	Bertoldo
13	Aldo Bini	Gino Bartali	Luigi Barral	Enrico Mollo & Luigi Barral	Fréjus	Bertoldo
14	Aldo Bini	Gino Bartali	Luigi Barral	Enrico Mollo & Luigi Barral	Fréjus	Il Littoriale
15	Glauco Servadei	Gino Bartali	Edoardo Molinar	Enrico Mollo & Luigi Barral	Fréjus	Il Littoriale
16	Gino Bartali	Gino Bartali	Edoardo Molinar	Enrico Mollo & Gino Bartali	Fréjus	Il Littoriale
17	Gino Bartali	Gino Bartali	Edoardo Molinar	Gino Bartali	Fréjus	Il Littoriale
18	Glauco Servadei	Gino Bartali	Edoardo Molinar	Gino Bartali	Fréjus	Il Littoriale
19a	Marco Cimatti	Gino Bartali	Edoardo Molinar	Gino Bartali	Fréjus	Il Littoriale
19b	Aldo Bini	Gino Bartali	Edoardo Molinar	Gino Bartali	Fréjus	Il Littoriale
Final		Gino Bartali	Edoardo Molinar	Gino Bartali	Fréjus	Il Littoriale

== Final standings ==
Legend
A pink jersey	Denotes the winner of the General classification
A white jersey	Denotes the winner of the free rider classification

=== General classification ===
Final general classification (1–10)
Rank	Name	Team	Time
1	Gino Bartali (ITA)	Legnano	122h 25' 40"
2	Giovanni Valetti (ITA)	Fréjus	+ 8' 18"
3	Enrico Mollo (ITA)	Fréjus	+ 17' 38"
4	Severino Canavesi (ITA)	Ganna	+ 21' 38"
5	Cesare Del Cancia (ITA)	Ganna	+ 23' 18"
6	Walter Generati (ITA)	Fréjus	+ 27' 28"
7	Edoardo Molinar (ITA)	—	+ 30' 31"
8	Bernardo Rogora (ITA)	—	+ 32' 07"
9	Ambrogio Morelli (ITA)	Italiani all'Estero	+ 48' 22"
10	Adriano Vignoli (ITA)	—	+ 55' 19"

=== Liberi classification ===
Final liberi rider classification (1–10)
Rank	Name	Team	Time
1	Edoardo Molinar (ITA)	—	122h 59' 41"
2	Bernardo Rogora (ITA)	—	+ 5' 07"
3	Ambrogio Morelli (ITA)	Italiani all'Estero	+ 14' 21"
4	Adriano Vignoli (ITA)	—	+ 21' 18"
5	Fausto Montesi (ITA)	—	+ 27' 04"
6	Leo Amberg (SUI)	—	+ 30' 14"
7	Luigi Barral (ITA)	Bertoldo	+ 39' 49"
8	Settimo Simonini (ITA)	Il Littoriale	+ 42' 44"
9	Zoarino Guidi (ITA)	Il Littoriale	+ 54' 59"
10	Francesco Patti (ITA)	—	+ 1h 10' 09"

=== Mountains classification ===
Final mountains classification (1–9)
Rank	Name	Team	Time
1	Gino Bartali (ITA)	Legnano	37
2	Enrico Mollo (ITA)	Fréjus	35
3	Luigi Barral (ITA)	Bertoldo	22
4	Ezio Checchi (ITA)	—	9
5	Adalino Mealli (ITA)	Legnano	8
6	Walter Generati (ITA)	Fréjus	6
6	Giovanni Valetti (ITA)	Fréjus	6
8	Marco Cimatti (ITA)	Italiani all'Estero	5
9	Cesare Del Gancia (ITA)	Ganna	3
9	Edoardo Molinar (ITA)	—	3

=== Team classification ===
Final team classification (1–3)
Rank	Team	Time
1	Fréjus	367h 50' 24"
2	Ganna	+ 1h 24' 24"
3	Legnano-Wolsit	+ 2h 24' 58"

=== Group classification ===
Final group classification (1–4)
Rank	Team	Time
1	Il Littoriale	370h 58' 04"
2	Italiani all'estero	+ 21' 27"
3	Bertoldo	+ 1h 05' 37"
4	Stranieri	+ 4h 10' 09"

=== Pinocchio classification ===
The 1937 had a Pinocchio classification, which worked in a similar way as the combativity classification: a jury gave points to the riders who deserved to win. It was won by Bartali.
