= Nello Troggi =

Italian cyclist

Personal information
- Born: 26 April 1912 Frosinone, Italy
- Died: 21 June 1944 (aged 32)

Cycling career
- Sport: Cycling
- Role: Rider

Nello Troggi (26 April 1912 – 21 June 1944) was an Italian racing cyclist. He won stage 1 of the 1937 Giro d'Italia.
