= Bernardo Rogora =

Italian cyclist

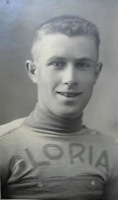

Personal information
- Nickname: Bernardinho
- Born: 6 December 1911 Solbiate Olona, Italy
- Died: 9 December 1970 (aged 59) Solbiate Olona, Italy

Cycling career
- Sport: Cycling
- Discipline: Road
- Role: Rider

Professional teams
- 1933–1940: Gloria
- 1941: Bianchi

Bernardo Rogora (6 December 1911 – 9 December 1970) was an Italian cyclist.

== Major results ==
1933
1st Milan–Modena
5th Giro di Lombardia
1934
1st Overall Volta a Catalunya

1st Stages 5 & 8

3rd Milan–Modena
7th Milan–San Remo
1937
1st National Cyclo-cross Championships
7th Overall Giro d'Italia
1939
10th Overall Giro d'Italia
