= Recoaro Terme =

- Comune
- Comune di Recoaro Terme
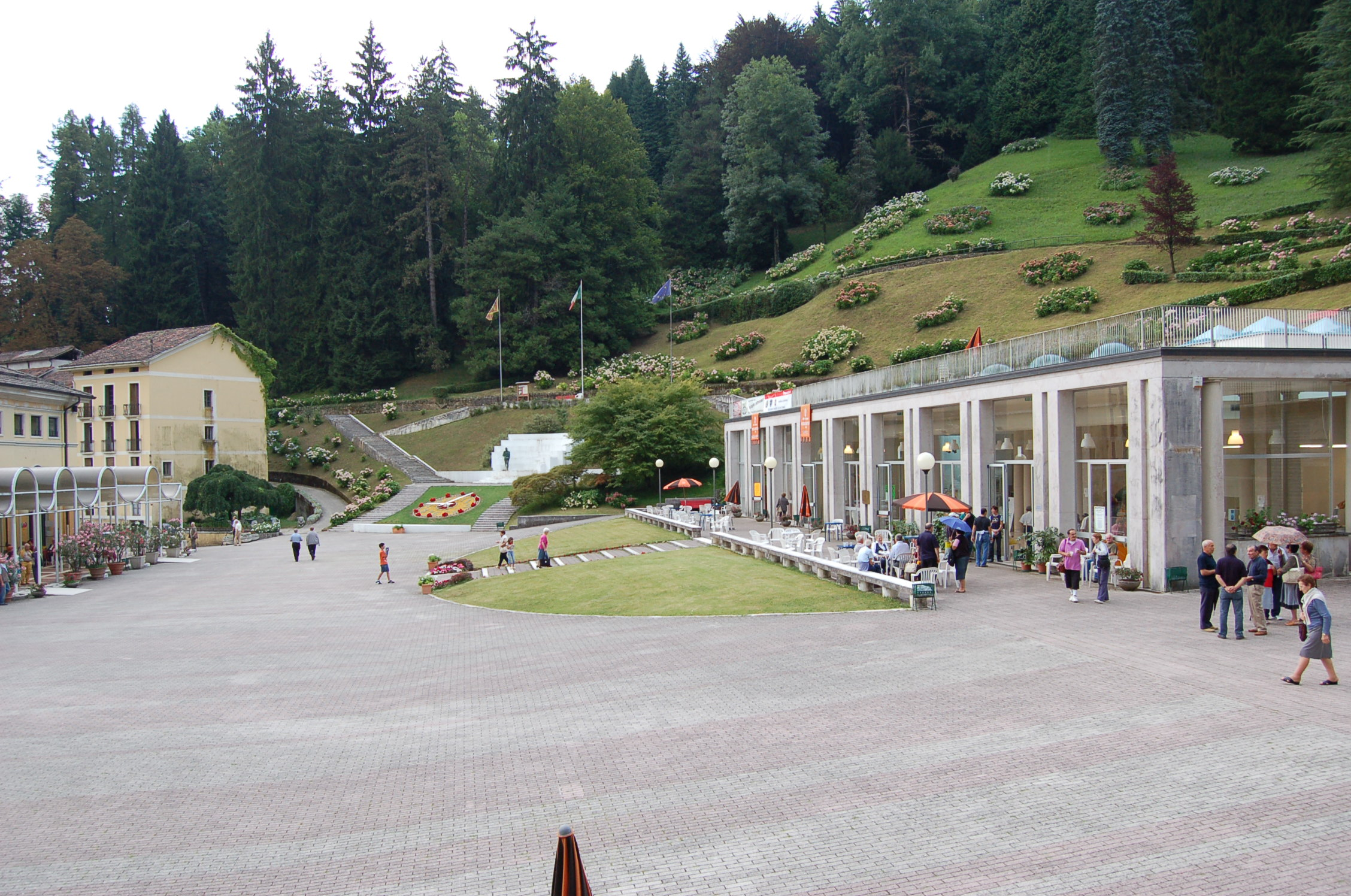
- Springs of Recoaro.

- Location within Italy Location within Veneto
- Coordinates: 45°42′N 11°14′E
- Country: Italy
- Region: Veneto
- Province: Vicenza (VI)
- Frazioni: Fongara, Merendaore, Rovegliana, Parlati

Government
  - Mayor: Giovanni Ceola

Area
  - Total: 60.15 km^{2} (23.22 sq mi)
- Elevation: 445 m (1,460 ft)

Population (31 December 2015)
  - Total: 6,453
  - Density: 107.3/km^{2} (277.9/sq mi)
- Demonym: Recoaresi
- Time zone: UTC+1 (CET)
  - Summer (DST): UTC+2 (CEST)
- Postal code: 36076
- Dialing code: 0445
- Patron saint: St. Anthony the Abbot
- Saint day: January 17
- Website: Official website

Recoaro Terme (Cimbrian: 'Recobör, Rocabör o Ricaber' ) is a town and comune in the province of Vicenza, Veneto, Italy. It is known for his mineral spring waters: Lora is bottled and commercialized, while some of the others are used for hydrotherapy in Terme Recoaro Spa.

== History ==
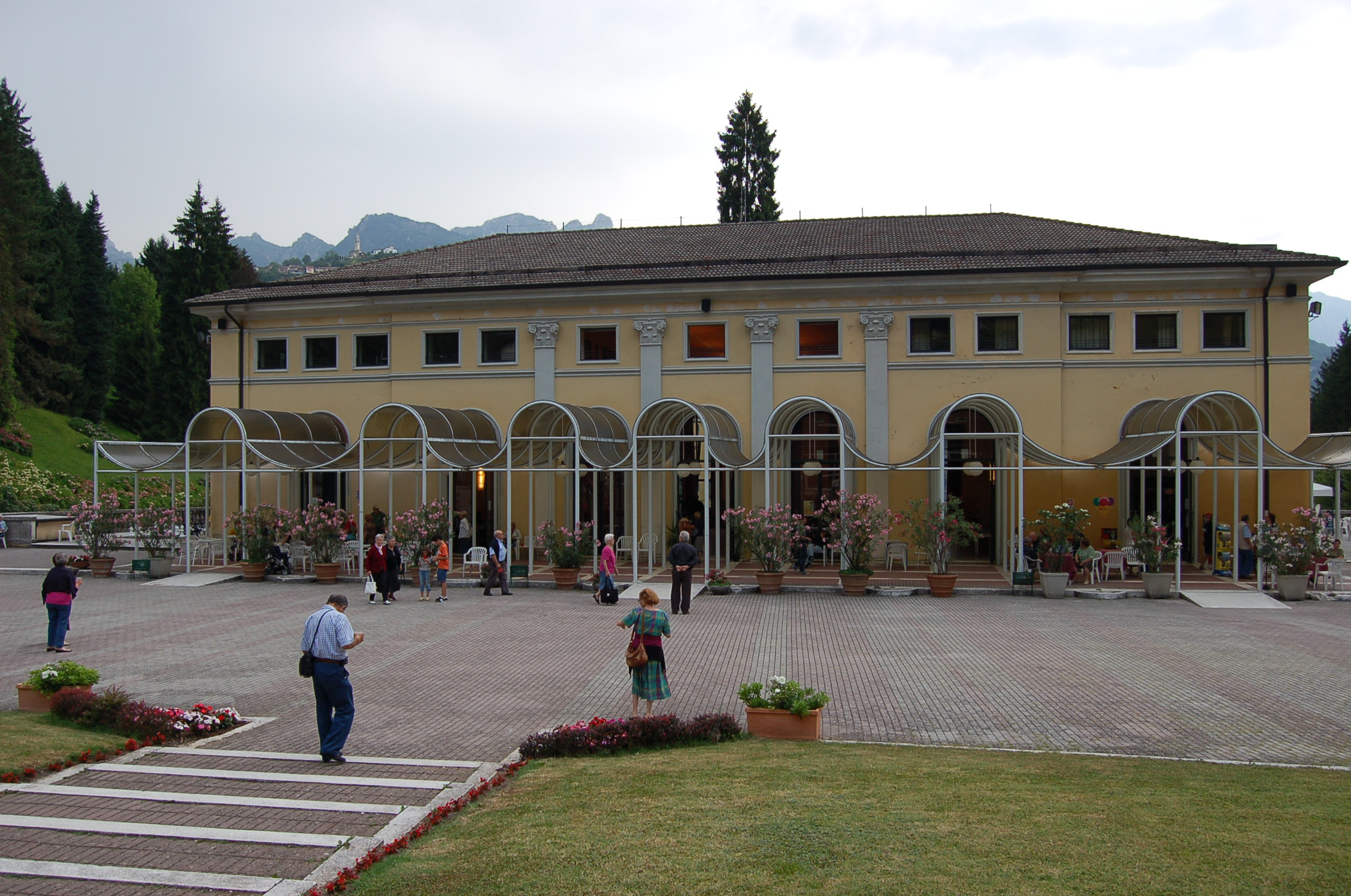
Recoaro Terme

The area of Recoaro was settled in the 13th century by German colonists, a document mentioning a villa in Rovegliana (now a frazione of Recoaro) in 1262. Later it was under the Scaliger, the Visconti of Milan and then under the Republic of Venice, to which it belonged until the late 18th century.

In 1689 thermal waters were discovered, which led to the development of Recoaro as a tourist resort in the following century, although most of the population lived on agriculture until the 19th century.

After being part of the Austrian puppet Kingdom of Lombardy–Venetia, Recoaro became part of the unified Kingdom of Italy in 1866. Friedrich Nietzsche sojourned here in 1881 and allegedly received the inspiration for his Thus Spoke Zarathustra. He wrote:

As far as landscape is concerned, Recoaro is one of my most beautiful experiences. I literally chased after its beauty, and expended a great deal of energy and enthusiasm on it. The beauty of nature, like every other kind of beauty, is quite jealous; it demands that one serve it alone

During World War II, Recoaro was the site of a German Wehrmacht command, using numerous occupied buildings, including the spa; this was bombed by Allied air forces in April 1945.

After World War II Recoaro it became an important center for the bottling of the homonymous mineral water Acqua Recoaro and other beverages; reaching a considerable development in the Italian market with a vast array of drinks, including two trademarks: Gingerino and Acqua Brillante (a tonic water).

== Main sights ==
- Church of Santa Giuliana (14th century)
- Church of San Bernardo (14th century)

== Transportation ==
The main connection is Provincial road (ex state road) 246.

== Twin towns ==
- Neustadt an der Donau, Germany, since 1989
- Colonia Carolina, Argentina
