= Marco Cimatti =

Italian cyclist (1913–1982)

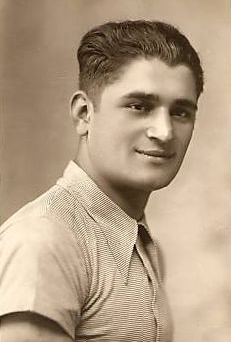

Personal information
- Born: 13 February 1913 Bertalia, Italy
- Died: 21 May 1982 (aged 69) Bertalia, Italy

Cycling career
- Sport: Cycling
Medal record
Representing Italy
Men's cycling
Olympic Games
Gold medal – first place	1932 Los Angeles	Team pursuit

Marco Cimatti (13 February 1913 – 21 May 1982) was an Italian cyclist who won a gold medal in the team pursuit at the 1932 Olympics. In 1934, he turned professional and won three stages of the 1937 Giro d'Italia and the opening stage of the 1938 Giro. In 1937, he founded a small company named Cimatti, which initially produced bicycles, but in the 1950s–1960s changed to mopeds and motorcycles. His son Enrico later expanded the business to export motorcycles to the United States, France, Norway and Tunisia.
