= Giuseppe Olivieri (racing cyclist) =

Italian cyclist

Personal information
- Born: 28 February 1889 Campo Ligure, Italy
- Died: 22 May 1973 (aged 84)

Cycling career
- Sport: Cycling
- Role: Rider

Giuseppe Olivieri (28 February 1889 – 22 May 1973) was an Italian racing cyclist. He won stage 1 of the 1920 Giro d'Italia.

== Career ==
He started his career as a track cyclist in Marseille, where he moved with his family. He accomplished the greatest achievements in his career in the years 1919–1921, namely:

- 1919
  - 3rd place in the Milan-San Remo race
  - 2nd place in the Milan-Turin race
- 1920
  - 1st place in the 1st stage of the Giro d'Italia race
- 1921
  - 1st place in the Mont Faron race
