= Cesare Del Cancia =

Italian cyclist

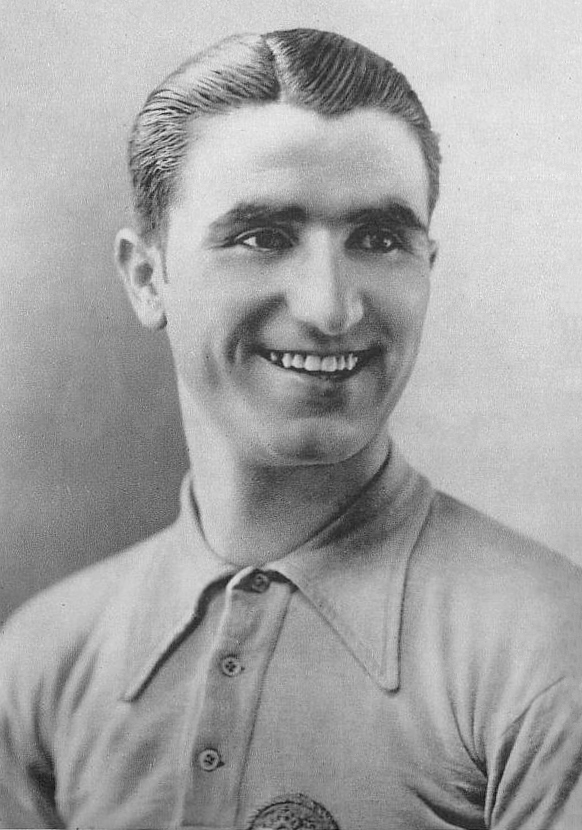
- Cesare Del Cancia c. 1937

Personal information
- Born: 6 May 1915 Buti, Italy
- Died: 25 April 2011 (aged 95) Pontedera, Italy

Cycling career
- Sport: Cycling
- Discipline: Road
- Role: Rider

Professional teams
- 1936–1939: Ganna
- 1940: MVSN–Viscontea
- 1941: Viscontea
- 1946: Welter–Ursus

Cesare Del Cancia (6 May 1915 – 25 April 2011) was an Italian road cyclist. After finishing fifth in the road race at the 1935 World Championships he turned professional and competed until 1945. He won the 1936 Milano–Torino, 1937 Milan–San Remo and 1938 Giro del Lazio races.

== Major results ==
1933
1st Giro del Casentino
1936
1st Milano–Torino
1st Tre Valli Varesine

1937
1st Milan–San Remo
1st Giro dell'Emilia
2nd Giro del Lazio
2nd Milano–Torino
2nd National Road Race Championships
5th Overall Giro d'Italia

1st Stage 11B

1938
1st Giro del Lazio
7th Overall Giro d'Italia

1st Stages 13 & 17

1939
2nd Giro del Piemonte
8th Overall Giro d'Italia
