= 1952 Challenge Desgrange-Colombo =

5th season of the tournament

- Fifth edition of the Challenge Desgrange-Colombo

Details
- Dates: 19 March – 26 October
- Location: Europe
- Races: 11

Champions
- Individual champion: Ferdinand Kübler (SUI) (Frejus)
- Nations' champion: Italy

The 1952 Challenge Desgrange-Colombo was the fifth edition of the Challenge Desgrange-Colombo. It included eleven races: all the races form the 1951 edition were retained with no additions. Ferdinand Kübler won his second edition, having previously won in 1950. Italy won the nations championship.

== Races ==
Date	Race	Country	Winner	Team	Report
19 March	Milan–San Remo	Italy	Loretto Petrucci (ITA)		Report
6 April	Tour of Flanders	Belgium	Roger Decock (BEL)	Bertin–d'Alessandro	Report
13 April	Paris–Roubaix	France	Rik Van Steenbergen (BEL)		Report
27 April	Paris–Brussels	France/Belgium	Briek Schotte (BEL)	Alcyon-Dunlop	Report
10 May	La Flèche Wallonne	Belgium	Ferdinand Kübler (SUI)	Frejus	Report
11 May	Liège–Bastogne–Liège	Belgium	Ferdinand Kübler (SUI)	Frejus	Report
17 May – 8 June	Giro d'Italia	Italy	Fausto Coppi (ITA)	Bianchi	Report
14 June – 21 June	Tour de Suisse	Switzerland	Pasquale Fornara (ITA)		Report
25 June – 19 July	Tour de France	France	Fausto Coppi (ITA)	Italy	Report
5 October	Paris–Tours	France	Raymond Guégan (FRA)		Report
26 October	Giro di Lombardia	Italy	Giuseppe Minardi (ITA)		Report

== Final standings ==
=== Riders ===
	Cyclist	Team	Points
1	Ferdinand Kübler (SUI)	Frejus	113
2	Fausto Coppi (ITA)	Bianchi	97
3	Stan Ockers (BEL)		72
4	Briek Schotte (BEL)	Alcyon-Dunlop	53
5	Jean Robic (FRA)		51
6	Louison Bobet (FRA)		50
7	Loretto Petrucci (ITA)		44
8	Alex Close (BEL)		32
9=	Raymond Impanis (BEL)		28
9=	Désiré Keteleer (BEL)		28

=== Nations ===
	Nation	Points
1	Italy	493
2	Belgium	410
3	France	349
