= 1958 Challenge Desgrange-Colombo =

Road bicycle race

- Eleventh edition of the Challenge Desgrange-Colombo

Details
- Dates: 19 March – 19 October
- Location: Europe
- Races: 12

Champions
- Individual champion: Fred De Bruyne (BEL) (Carpano)
- Nations' champion: Belgium

The 1958 Challenge Desgrange-Colombo was the eleventh and final edition of the Challenge Desgrange-Colombo. It included eleven races: all the races form the 1957 edition were retained and the Vuelta a España was included for the first time. Fred De Bruyne won the third of his three individual championships while Belgium retained the nations championship. The Challenge Desgrange-Colombo folded after the 1958 season and the Super Prestige Pernod replaced it as the season-long competition for road bicycle racing.

== Races ==
Date	Race	Country	Winner	Team	Report
19 March	Milan–San Remo	Italy	Rik Van Looy (BEL)	Faema-Guerra	Report
30 March	Tour of Flanders	Belgium	Germain Derijcke (BEL)	Carpano	Report
13 April	Paris–Roubaix	France	Leon Vandaele (BEL)		Report
20 April	Paris–Brussels	France/Belgium	Rik Van Looy (BEL)	Faema-Guerra	Report
26 April	La Flèche Wallonne	Belgium	Rik Van Steenbergen (BEL)		Report
27 April	Liège–Bastogne–Liège	Belgium	Fred De Bruyne (BEL)	Carpano	Report
30 April – 15 May	Vuelta a España	Spain	Jean Stablinski (FRA)		Report
18 May – 8 June	Giro d'Italia	Italy	Ercole Baldini (ITA)		Report
11 June – 18 June	Tour de Suisse	Switzerland	Pasquale Fornara (ITA)		Report
26 June – 19 July	Tour de France	France	Charly Gaul (LUX)	Netherlands/Luxembourg	Report
5 October	Paris–Tours	France	Gilbert Desmet (BEL)		Report
19 October	Giro di Lombardia	Italy	Nino Defilippis (ITA)	Carpano	Report

== Final standings ==
=== Riders ===
	Cyclist	Team	Points
1	Fred De Bruyne (BEL)	Carpano	89
2	Rik Van Looy (BEL)		77
3	Charly Gaul (LUX)		76
4	Miguel Poblet (ESP)		71
5	Ercole Baldini (ITA)		57
6	Louison Bobet (FRA)		54
7	Pasquale Fornara (ITA)		51
8	Raphaël Géminiani (FRA)		46
9	Gastone Nencini (ITA)		44
10	Nino Defilippis (ITA)		42

=== Nations ===
	Nation	Points
1	Belgium	655
2	Italy	352
3	France	282
