= 1956 Challenge Desgrange-Colombo =

- Ninth edition of the Challenge Desgrange-Colombo

Details
- Dates: 19 March – 21 October
- Location: Europe
- Races: 11

Champions
- Individual champion: Fred De Bruyne (BEL) (Mercier–BP–Hutchinson)
- Nations' champion: Belgium

The 1956 Challenge Desgrange-Colombo was the ninth edition of the Challenge Desgrange-Colombo. It included eleven races: all the races form the 1955 edition were retained with no additions. Fred De Bruyne won the first of his three individual championships while Belgium retained the nations championship.

== Races ==
Date	Race	Country	Winner	Team	Report
19 March	Milan–San Remo	Italy	Fred De Bruyne (BEL)	Mercier–BP–Hutchinson	Report
2 April	Tour of Flanders	Belgium	Jean Forestier (FRA)	Follis–Dunlop	Report
8 April	Paris–Roubaix	France	Louison Bobet (FRA)	Mercier–BP–Hutchinson	Report
22 April	Paris–Brussels	France/Belgium	Rik Van Looy (BEL)	Faema-Guerra-Van Hauwaert	Report
5 May	La Flèche Wallonne	Belgium	Richard Van Genechten (BEL)	Elvé-Peugeot	Report
6 May	Liège–Bastogne–Liège	Belgium	Fred De Bruyne (BEL)	Mercier–BP–Hutchinson	Report
19 May – 10 June	Giro d'Italia	Italy	Charly Gaul (LUX)	Faema-Guerra-Van Hauwaert	Report
16 June – 23 June	Tour de Suisse	Switzerland	Rolf Graf (SUI)		Report
5 July – 28 July	Tour de France	France	Roger Walkowiak (FRA)	North-East/Centre	Report
7 October	Paris–Tours	France	Albert Bouvet (FRA)	Mercier–BP–Hutchinson	Report
21 October	Giro di Lombardia	Italy	André Darrigade (FRA)	Bianchi–Pirelli	Report

== Final standings ==
=== Riders ===
	Cyclist	Team	Points
1	Fred De Bruyne (BEL)	Mercier–BP–Hutchinson	84
2	Fiorenzo Magni (ITA)		66
3	Stan Ockers (BEL)		62
4	Jean Forestier (FRA)		61
5	Andre Vlayen (BEL)		47
6	Charly Gaul (LUX)		46
7	Louison Bobet (FRA)		44
8=	Germain Derycke (BEL)		41
8=	Jef Planckaert (BEL)		41
8=	Rik Van Steenbergen (BEL)		41

=== Nations ===
	Nation	Points
1	Belgium	569
2	France	326
3	Italy	323
