= 1957 Challenge Desgrange-Colombo =

- Tenth edition of the Challenge Desgrange-Colombo

Details
- Dates: 19 March – 20 October
- Location: Europe
- Races: 11

Champions
- Individual champion: Fred De Bruyne (BEL) (Carpano–Coppi)
- Nations' champion: Belgium

The 1957 Challenge Desgrange-Colombo was the tenth edition of the Challenge Desgrange-Colombo. It included eleven races: all the races form the 1956 edition were retained with no additions. Fred De Bruyne won the second of his three individual championships while Belgium retained the nations championship.

== Races ==
Date	Race	Country	Winner	Team	Report
19 March	Milan–San Remo	Italy	Miguel Poblet (ESP)		Report
31 March	Tour of Flanders	Belgium	Fred De Bruyne (BEL)	Carpano–Coppi	Report
7 April	Paris–Roubaix	France	Fred De Bruyne (BEL)	Carpano–Coppi	Report
22 April	Paris–Brussels	France/Belgium	Léon Van Daele (BEL)	Faema–Guerra	Report
4 May	La Flèche Wallonne	Belgium	Raymond Impanis (BEL)		Report
5 May	Liège–Bastogne–Liège	Belgium	Frans Schoubben (BEL)		Report
18 May – 9 June	Giro d'Italia	Italy	Gastone Nencini (ITA)	Leo–Chlorodont	Report
12 June – 20 June	Tour de Suisse	Switzerland	Pasquale Fornara (ITA)		Report
27 June – 20 July	Tour de France	France	Jacques Anquetil (FRA)	France	Report
6 October	Paris–Tours	France	Fred De Bruyne (BEL)	Carpano–Coppi	Report
20 October	Giro di Lombardia	Italy	Diego Ronchini (ITA)	Ignis	Report

== Final standings ==
=== Riders ===
	Cyclist	Team	Points
1	Fred De Bruyne (BEL)	Carpano–Coppi	90
2	Raymond Impanis (BEL)		76
3	Gastone Nencini (ITA)		70
4	Louison Bobet (FRA)		58
5	Miguel Poblet (ESP)		55
6	Jef Planckaert (BEL)		48
7	Marcel Janssens (BEL)		47
8	Jacques Anquetil (FRA)		46
9	Nino Defilippis (ITA)		43
10=	Adolf Christian (AUT)		36
10=	Pasquale Fornara (ITA)		36

=== Nations ===
	Nation	Points
1	Belgium	593
2	France	359
3	Italy	318
