= 1948 Challenge Desgrange-Colombo =

- First edition of the Challenge Desgrange-Colombo

Details
- Dates: 19 March – 24 October
- Location: Europe
- Races: 9

Champions
- Individual champion: Briek Schotte (BEL) (Alcyon–Dunlop)
- Nations' champion: Italy

The 1948 Challenge Desgrange-Colombo was the first edition of the Challenge Desgrange-Colombo. It included nine races - seven one-day races and two stage races - all in Belgium, France or Italy.

== Races ==
Date	Race	Country	Winner	Team	Report
19 March	Milan–San Remo	Italy	Fausto Coppi (ITA)	Bianchi	Report
4 April	Paris–Roubaix	France	Rik Van Steenbergen (BEL)	Mercier–Hutchinson	Report
11 April	Paris–Brussels	France/Belgium	Lode Poels (BEL)	Garin-Wolber	Report
18 April	Tour of Flanders	Belgium	Briek Schotte (BEL)	Alcyon–Dunlop	Report
21 April	La Flèche Wallonne	Belgium	Fermo Camellini (ITA)	Métropole	Report
25 April	Paris–Tours	France	Louis Caput (FRA)		Report
15 May – 6 June	Giro d'Italia	Italy	Fiorenzo Magni (ITA)	Wilier Triestina	Report
30 June – 25 July	Tour de France	France	Gino Bartali (ITA)	Italy	Report
24 October	Giro di Lombardia	Italy	Fausto Coppi (ITA)	Bianchi	Report

== Final standings ==
=== Riders ===
	Cyclist	Team	Points
1	Briek Schotte (BEL)	Alcyon–Dunlop	142
2	Fermo Camellini (FRA)	Métropole	118
3	Gino Bartali (ITA)	Legnano	96
4	Fiorenzo Magni (ITA)	Wilier Triestina	84
5	Vito Ortelli (ITA)		65
6	Giordano Cottur (ITA)		64
7	Louison Bobet (FRA)		63
8	Marcel Rijckaert (BEL)		63
9	Albert Ramon (BEL)		62
10	Fausto Coppi (ITA)	Bianchi	60

=== Nations ===
	Nation	Points
1	Italy	768.5
2	Belgium	711.5
3	France	548.5
