= 1951 Challenge Desgrange-Colombo =

- Fourth edition of the Challenge Desgrange-Colombo

Details
- Dates: 19 March – 21 October
- Location: Europe
- Races: 11

Champions
- Individual champion: Louison Bobet (FRA) (Stella–Dunlop)
- Nations' champion: France

The 1951 Challenge Desgrange-Colombo was the fourth edition of the Challenge Desgrange-Colombo. It included eleven races: all the races form the 1950 edition were retained with the addition of Liège–Bastogne–Liège. Paris–Tours moved from a spring slot to an autumn slot. Louison Bobet won the competition by a single point to 1950 champion Ferdinand Kübler. France won their first nations championship.

== Races ==
Date	Race	Country	Winner	Team	Report
19 March	Milan–San Remo	Italy	Louison Bobet (FRA)	Stella–Dunlop	Report
1 April	Tour of Flanders	Belgium	Fiorenzo Magni (ITA)	Ganna	Report
8 April	Paris–Roubaix	France	Antonio Bevilacqua (ITA)	Benotto-Ursus-Fiorelli	Report
15 April	Paris–Brussels	France/Belgium	Jean Guéguen (FRA)	Mercier–Hutchinson	Report
21 April	La Flèche Wallonne	Belgium	Ferdinand Kübler (SUI)	Fréjus	Report
22 April	Liège–Bastogne–Liège	Belgium	Ferdinand Kübler (SUI)	Fréjus	Report
19 May – 10 June	Giro d'Italia	Italy	Fiorenzo Magni (ITA)	Ganna	Report
15 June – 23 June	Tour de Suisse	Switzerland	Ferdinand Kübler (SUI)	Fréjus	Report
4 July – 29 July	Tour de France	France	Hugo Koblet (SUI)	Switzerland	Report
7 October	Paris–Tours	France	Jacques Dupont (FRA)		Report
21 October	Giro di Lombardia	Italy	Louison Bobet (FRA)	Stella–Dunlop	Report

== Final standings ==
=== Riders ===
	Cyclist	Team	Points
1	Louison Bobet (FRA)	Stella–Dunlop	97
2	Ferdinand Kübler (SUI)		96
3	Fiorenzo Magni (ITA)		90
4	Hugo Koblet (SUI)		77
5	Gino Bartali (ITA)		69
6	Rik Van Steenbergen (BEL)		68
7	Fausto Coppi (ITA)		53
8	Bernard Gauthier (FRA)		51
9	Raymond Impanis (BEL)		40
10	Pierre Barbotin (FRA)		37

=== Nations ===
	Nation	Points
1	France	483
2	Italy	474
3	Belgium	302
