= 1954 Challenge Desgrange-Colombo =

- Seventh edition of the Challenge Desgrange-Colombo

Details
- Dates: 19 March – 31 October
- Location: Europe
- Races: 11

Champions
- Individual champion: Ferdinand Kübler (SUI) (Fiorelli)
- Nations' champion: Belgium

The 1954 Challenge Desgrange-Colombo was the seventh edition of the Challenge Desgrange-Colombo. It included eleven races: all the races form the 1953 edition were retained with no additions. Ferdinand Kübler won his third individual championship (although he did not win any of the races) while Belgium won the nations championship.

== Races ==
Date	Race	Country	Winner	Team	Report
19 March	Milan–San Remo	Italy	Rik Van Steenbergen (BEL)	Mercier–BP–Hutchinson	Report
4 April	Tour of Flanders	Belgium	Raymond Impanis (BEL)	Mercier–BP–Hutchinson	Report
11 April	Paris–Roubaix	France	Raymond Impanis (BEL)	Mercier–BP–Hutchinson	Report
25 April	Paris–Brussels	France/Belgium	Marcel Hendrickx (BEL)	Peugeot–Dunlop	Report
8 May	La Flèche Wallonne	Belgium	Germain Derycke (BEL)	Alcyon–Dunlop	Report
9 May	Liège–Bastogne–Liège	Belgium	Marcel Ernzer (LUX)	Terrot–Hutchinson	Report
21 May – 13 June	Giro d'Italia	Italy	Carlo Clerici (SUI)	Guerra	Report
8 July – 1 August	Tour de France	France	Louison Bobet (FRA)	France	Report
7 August – 14 August	Tour de Suisse	Switzerland	Pasquale Fornara (ITA)		Report
10 October	Paris–Tours	France	Gilbert Scodeller (FRA)	Mercier–BP–Hutchinson	Report
31 October	Giro di Lombardia	Italy	Fausto Coppi (ITA)	Bianchi–Pirelli	Report

== Final standings ==
=== Riders ===
	Cyclist	Team	Points
1	Ferdinand Kübler (SUI)	Fiorelli	94
2	Raymond Impanis (BEL)	Mercier–Hutchinson	66
3	Louison Bobet (FRA)		59
4	Germain Derycke (BEL)	Alcyon–Dunlop	52
5=	Roger Decock (BEL)		47
5=	Stan Ockers (BEL)		47
7	Fiorenzo Magni (ITA)		46
8	Fritz Schär (SUI)		44
9=	Hugo Koblet (SUI)		38
9=	Agostino Coletto (ITA)		38

=== Nations ===
	Nation	Points
1	Belgium	463
2	Italy	355
3	France	280
