= Moresco (surname) =

Moresco is a surname. Notable people with the surname include:

- Antonio Moresco (born 1947), Italian writer
- Benedetta Moresco (born 2001), Italian golfer
- Carlo Moresco (1905–1990), American conductor, composer, violinist, and stage director
- Jacob Heinrich Moresco (1828–1906), Danish businessman
- Rinaldo Moresco (born 1925), Italian road cyclist
- Robert Moresco (born 1951), American producer, screenwriter, director and actor
- Tim Moresco (born 1954), American footballer

== See also ==
- Franco Maresco (born 1958), Italian filmmaker
