= 1954 Paris–Tours =

Race details
- Dates: 10 October 1954
- Stages: 1
- Distance: 253 km (157.2 mi)
- Winning time: 6h 11' 19"

Results
| | Winner | Gilbert Scodeller (FRA) |
| | Second | Louison Bobet (FRA) |
| | Third | Pierre Michel (FRA) |

The 1954 Paris–Tours was the 48th edition of the Paris–Tours cycle race and was held on 10 October 1954. The race started in Paris and finished in Tours. The race was won by Gilbert Scodeller.

== General classification ==
Final general classification

| Rank | Rider | Time |
|---|---|---|
| 1 | Gilbert Scodeller (FRA) | 6h 11' 19" |
| 2 | Louison Bobet (FRA) | + 2" |
| 3 | Pierre Michel (FRA) | + 2" |
| 4 | Briek Schotte (BEL) | + 2" |
| 5 | Rik Van Steenbergen (BEL) | + 2" |
| 6 | Fred De Bruyne (BEL) | + 2" |
| 7 | Roger Decock (BEL) | + 2" |
| 8 | Angelo Conterno (ITA) | + 2" |
| 9 | Germain Derycke (BEL) | + 2" |
| 10 | Loretto Petrucci (ITA) | + 2" |
