= 1954 UCI Road World Championships – Men's road race =

Men's Individual Road Race
1954 UCI Road World Championships
- Rainbow jersey

Race details
- Dates: 22 August 1954
- Stages: 1
- Distance: 240 km (149.1 mi)
- Winning time: 7h 24' 36"

Results
	Winner	Louison Bobet (FRA)	(France)
	Second	Fritz Schär (SUI)	(Switzerland)
	Third	Charly Gaul (LUX)	(Luxembourg)

The men's road race at the 1954 UCI Road World Championships was the 21st edition of the event. The race took place on Sunday 22 August 1954 in Solingen, West Germany. The race was won by Louison Bobet of France.

== Final classification ==
General classification (1–10)

Rank	Rider	Time
1st place, gold medalist(s)	Louison Bobet (FRA)	7h 24' 36"
2nd place, silver medalist(s)	Fritz Schär (SUI)	+ 12"
3rd place, bronze medalist(s)	Charly Gaul (LUX)	+ 2' 12"
4	Michele Gismondi (ITA)	+ 3' 03"
5	Jacques Anquetil (FRA)	+ 3' 03"
6	Fausto Coppi (ITA)	+ 3' 20"
7	Robert Varnajo (FRA)	+ 7' 35"
8	Jean Forestier (FRA)	+ 11' 03"
9	Fred De Bruyne (BEL)	+ 11' 03"
10	Pasquale Fornara (ITA)	+ 11' 03"
