= 1953 Tour of Flanders =

37th Tour of Flanders
Race details
- Dates: 5 April 1953
- Stages: 1
- Distance: 253 km (157.2 mi)
- Winning time: 7h 19'

Results
	Winner	Wim van Est (NED)	(Garin)
	Second	Désiré Keteleer (BEL)	(Garin)
	Third	Bernard Gauthier (FRA)	(Mercier–Hutchinson)

The 37th running of the Tour of Flanders cycling classic was held on Sunday, 5 April 1953. Dutch rider Wim van Est won the race in a two-man sprint with Désiré Keteleer in Wetteren. 44 of 213 riders finished.

== Route ==
The race started in Ghent and finished in Wetteren – totaling 253 km. The course featured five categorized climbs:

- Kluisberg
- Kwaremont
- Kruisberg
- Edelareberg
- Kloosterstraat (Geraardsbergen)

== Results ==
Result
Rank	Rider	Team	Time
1	Wim van Est (NED)	Garin	7h 19' 00"
2	Désiré Keteleer (BEL)	Garin	s.t.
3	Bernard Gauthier (FRA)	Mercier–Hutchinson	+ 45"
4	Louison Bobet (FRA)	Stella–Wolber–Dunlop	+ 1' 40"
5	Loretto Petrucci (ITA)	Bianchi–Pirelli	s.t.
6	Attilio Redolfi (FRA)	Mercier–Leducq	+ 2' 40"
7	Jacques Dupont (FRA)	Dilecta–Wolber–Bouvet	+ 4' 48"
8	Hilaire Couvreur (BEL)	Terrot–Hutchinson	+ 5' 50"
9	Stanislas Bober (FRA)	Alcyon–Dunlop	+ 5' 54"
10	Valère Ollivier (BEL)	Bertin–d'Alessandro	+ 6' 10"
