= 1958 UCI Road World Championships – Men's road race =

Men's Individual Road Race
1958 UCI Road World Championships
- Rainbow jersey

Race details
- Dates: 31 August 1958
- Stages: 1
- Distance: 277 km (172.1 mi)
- Winning time: 7h 29' 32"

Results
	Winner	Ercole Baldini (ITA)	(Italy)
	Second	Louison Bobet (FRA)	(France)
	Third	André Darrigade (FRA)	(France)

The men's road race at the 1958 UCI Road World Championships was the 25th edition of the event. The race took place on Sunday 31 August 1958 in Reims, France. The race was won by Ercole Baldini of Italy.

== Final classification ==
General classification (1–10)

Rank	Rider	Time
1st place, gold medalist(s)	Ercole Baldini (ITA)	7h 29' 32"
2nd place, silver medalist(s)	Louison Bobet (FRA)	+ 2' 09"
3rd place, bronze medalist(s)	André Darrigade (FRA)	+ 3' 47"
4	Vito Favero (ITA)	+ 3' 47"
5	Jean Forestier (FRA)	+ 3' 47"
6	Valentin Huot (FRA)	+ 3' 47"
7	Hans Junkermann (FRG)	+ 3' 47"
8	Martin van der Borgh (NED)	+ 4' 25"
9	Frans Aerenhouts (BEL)	+ 4' 40"
10	Klaus Bugdahl (FRG)	+ 4' 40"
