= Ercole Baldini =

Italian cyclist (1933–2022)

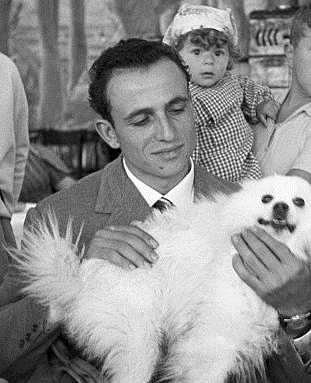
- Baldini in 1956

Personal information
- Full name: Ercole Baldini
- Born: 26 January 1933 Forli, Italy
- Died: 1 December 2022 (aged 89) Forli, Italy

Cycling career
- Sport: Cycling
- Role: Rider

Professional teams
- 1957–1958: Legnano
- 1959–1962: Ignis–Frejus
- 1963: Cynar–Frejus
- 1964: Salvarani

Major wins
- Grand Tours Giro d'Italia General classification (1958) One-day races and Classics Road Race World Championships (1958) Italian National Road Race Championship (1957, 1958)
Medal record
Representing Italy
Men's road bicycle racing
Olympic Games
Gold medal – first place	1956 Melbourne	Individual road race
World Championships
Gold medal – first place	1958 Reims	Professional road race
Track cycling
World Championships
Gold medal – first place	1956 Copenhagen	Individual pursuit, amateur
Bronze medal – third place	1960 Leipzig	Individual pursuit, elite
Bronze medal – third place	1964 Paris	Individual pursuit, elite

Ercole Baldini (26 January 1933 – 1 December 2022) was an Italian cyclist. As an amateur he won an Olympic gold medal in the road race and the world title in the individual pursuit on track, both in 1956. Next year he turned professional, and in 1958 won the world title in the road race and the Giro d'Italia. He continued competing on track and won bronze medals in the individual pursuit at the world championships of 1960 and 1964.

== Biography ==
Baldini was born at Villanova di Forlì. At 21 he set the hour record for amateurs, with 44.870 km, gaining the nickname of Forlì train. His best year was 1956, in which he won a gold medal in the road race at the Summer Olympics in Melbourne, and, in September, stripped Jacques Anquetil of the hour record, riding 46.394 km at the Velodromo Vigorelli in Milan.

In 1957 he became professional and won six important races, including the Trofeo Baracchi alongside Fausto Coppi, and became Italian champion. In 1958 Baldini won the Giro d'Italia, beating Charly Gaul on the latter's favourite terrain, climbing. He was again Italian champion and also won the World Cycling Championship.

Baldini finished 6th in the 1959 Tour de France. His career ended in 1964 after surgery to a leg.

== Death ==
Baldini died in his home in Villanova on 1 December 2022, at the age of 89.

== Career achievements ==
=== Major results ===
1953
3rd Piccolo Giro di Lombardia

1954
1st Targa D’Oro Città di Legnano
World hour record (Amateurs) – 44.90km

1956
1st Olympic Games Road Race
1st UCI Track Cycling World Championships (Individual Pursuit)
1st National Track Cycling Championships (Individual Pursuit)
1st Milano–Bologna
1st Manx International
World hour record – 46.39km

1957
1st National Road Championship, Road Race
1st Coppa Brescia
1st Pescara Criterium
1st Giro della Romagna
1st Giro del Lazio
1st GP de Lugano
1st Trofeo Baracchi (with Fausto Coppi)
2nd Tre Valli Varesine
2nd Grand Prix des Nations
2nd Vezzola Criterium
2nd GP Martini
2nd Cenon Criterium
3rd Overall Giro d'Italia

1st Stage 12

3rd Giro della Provincia di Reggio Calabria
3rd Parma Criterium

1958
1st UCI Road World Championships, Road Race
1st National Road Championship, Road Race
1st Overall Giro d'Italia

1st Stages 2, 8, 15 & 17

1st Trofeo Matteotti
1st GP Industria e Commercio di Prato
1st Trofeo Baracchi (with Aldo Moser)
1st Coppa Collecchio
1st Castrocaro Terme
1st Forlì Criterium
1st Riccione Criteriym
1st Stages 3b & 6a Roma–Napoli–Roma
2nd GP Martini
2nd Giro della Provincia di Reggio Calabria
2nd San Maria Vezzola
2nd Valeggio sul Mincio
5th Desgrange-Colombo

1959
1st Castrocaro Terme
1st GP Faema
1st Giro dell'Emilia
1st Trofeo Baracchi (with Aldo Moser)
2nd Bol d'Or des Monédières
2nd GP de Lugano
3rd Trofeo Longines
6th Overall Tour de France

1st Stage 18

1960
1st Grand Prix des Nations
2nd Giro dell'Appennino
2nd Trofeo Baracchi
2nd Castrocaro Terme
3rd UCI Track Cycling World Championships (Individual Pursuit)
3rd GP de Lugano
3rd Giro del Veneto

1961
1st Trofeo Moschini
1st Trofeo Baracchi (with Joseph Velly)
1st GP d'Europe
2nd Ravenna Criterium
2nd Castrocaro Terme
3rd GP du Parisien
3rd Coppa Agostoni
8th Bordighera Criterium

1962
1st Ponte di Piave
2nd Castrocaro Terme
2nd Coppa Sabatini
2nd GP de Lugano
2nd Trofeo Baracchi
3rd Giro della Romagna
4th GP Alghero
7th Overall Giro d'Italia
7th Giro di Lombardia
7th Giro del Lazio
8th Overall Tour de France

1963
1st Giro della Provincia di Reggio Calabria
1st Criterium dei Campioni
1st Coppa Placci
1st Castrocaro Terme
3rd Overall Giro del Trentino

1964
2nd Trofeo Baracchi
3rd UCI Track Cycling World Championships (Individual Pursuit)

=== Grand Tour general classification results timeline ===
Grand Tour	1957	1958	1959	1960	1961	1962	1963	1964
Vuelta a España	—	—	—	—	—	—	—	—
Giro d'Italia	3	1	17	41	DNF	7	26	DNF
Tour de France	—	—	6	33	—	8	—	DNF

Legend
—	Did not compete
DNF	Did not finish
DSQ	Disqualified

== See also ==
- Legends of Italian sport - Walk of Fame

Records
Preceded by Jacques Anquetil	UCI hour record (46.394 km); 19 September 1956-18 September 1957	Succeeded by Roger Rivière
