= 1955 Critérium du Dauphiné Libéré =

Race details
- Dates: 11–19 June 1955
- Stages: 8
- Distance: 1,777 km (1,104 mi)
- Winning time: 49h 40' 01"

Results
	Winner	Louison Bobet (FRA)	(Mercier–BP–Hutchinson)
	Second	Roger Walkowiak (FRA)	(Gitane–Hutchinson)
	Third	Marcel De Mulder (BEL)	(Belgium)
	Points	René Privat (FRA)	(Mercier–BP–Hutchinson)
	Mountains	Maurice Lampre (FRA)	(Saint-Raphaël–R. Geminiani–Dunlop)
	Team	Mercier–BP–Hutchinson	

The 1955 Critérium du Dauphiné Libéré was the ninth edition of the cycle race and was held from 11 June to 19 June 1955. The race started in Valence and finished at Grenoble. The race was won by Louison Bobet of the Mercier team.

== General classification ==
Final general classification

Rank	Rider	Team	Time
1	Louison Bobet (FRA)	Mercier–BP–Hutchinson	49h 40' 01"
2	Roger Walkowiak (FRA)	Gitane–Hutchinson	+ 9' 51"
3	Marcel De Mulder (BEL)	Belgium	+ 12' 46"
4	René Privat (FRA)	Mercier–BP–Hutchinson	+ 17' 12"
5	Antonin Rolland (FRA)	Mercier–BP–Hutchinson	+ 18' 32"
6	Jean Vliegen (BEL)	Belgium	+ 19' 36"
7	Georges Meunier (FRA)	Mercier–BP–Hutchinson	+ 20' 35"
8	Jean Bobet (FRA)	Mercier–BP–Hutchinson	+ 23' 56"
9	Maurice Lampre (FRA)	Saint-Raphaël–R. Geminiani–Dunlop	+ 29' 20"
10	Vincent Vitetta (FRA)	Alcyon–Dunlop	+ 29' 41"
