= 1952 Paris–Nice =

Race details
- Dates: 25–30 March 1952
- Stages: 6
- Distance: 1,260 km (782.9 mi)
- Winning time: 36h 35' 24"

Results
	Winner	Louison Bobet (FRA)
	Second	Donato Zampini (ITA)
	Third	Raymond Impanis (BEL)

The 1952 Paris–Nice was the tenth edition of the Paris–Nice cycle race and was held from 25 March to 30 March 1952. The race started in Paris and finished in Nice. The race was won by Louison Bobet.

== General classification ==
Final general classification

Rank	Rider	Time
1	Louison Bobet (FRA)	36h 35' 24"
2	Donato Zampini (ITA)	+ 4' 18"
3	Raymond Impanis (BEL)	+ 5' 52"
4	Jean Dotto (FRA)	+ 7' 25"
5	Désiré Keteleer (BEL)	+ 11' 31"
6	Lucien Teisseire (FRA)	+ 15' 00"
7	Pierre Barbotin (FRA)	+ 15' 40"
8	Antonin Rolland (FRA)	+ 16' 56"
9	Georges Decaux (FRA)	+ 17' 44"
10	Albert Dolhats (FRA)	+ 18' 12"
