= Stella (bicycle company) =

French bicycle manufacturer

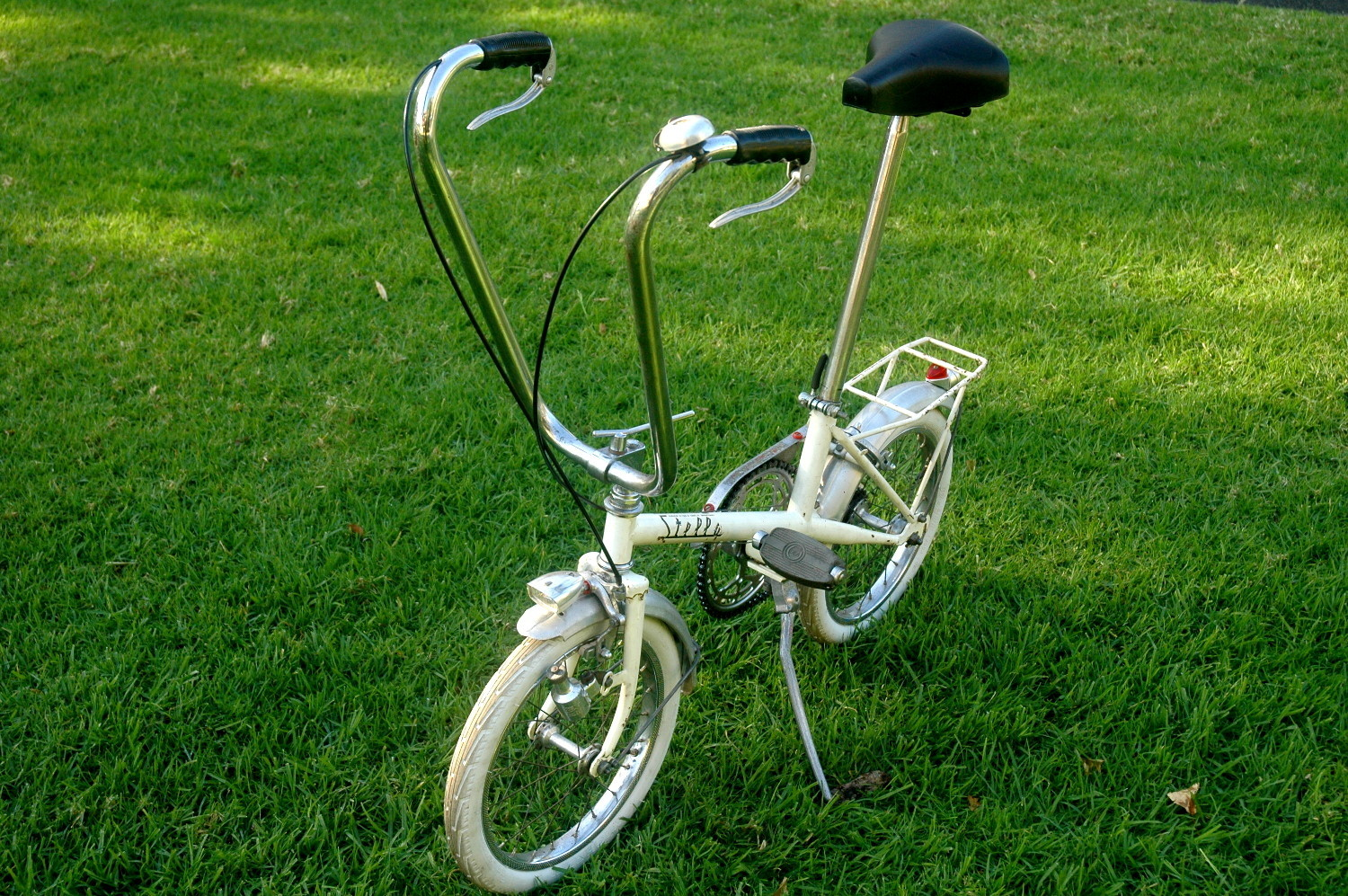
1965 Stella Pocketby folding bicycle

Stella was a French bicycle manufacturer founded in 1909. The company sponsored Louison Bobet, a French professional cyclist. Bobet won the Tour de France in 1953 and 1954 while riding Stella bicycles.

== Trivia ==
Stella became the codename for the Atari 2600 because Jay Miner (the video chip designer) owned a Stella bicycle.
