= 1949 Challenge Desgrange-Colombo =

Cycling season 2

- Second edition of the Challenge Desgrange-Colombo

Details
- Dates: 19 March – 23 October
- Location: Europe
- Races: 10

Champions
- Individual champion: Fausto Coppi (ITA) (Bianchi–Ursus)
- Nations' champion: Italy

The 1949 Challenge Desgrange-Colombo was the second edition of the Challenge Desgrange-Colombo. It included ten races: all nine races from the 1948 edition were retained and the Tour de Suisse added. The competition was won by Fausto Coppi of the Bianchi–Ursus who won four of the ten rounds: Milan–San Remo, the Giro d'Italia, the Tour de France and the Giro di Lombardia.

== Races ==
Date	Race	Country	Winner	Team	Report
19 March	Milan–San Remo	Italy	Fausto Coppi (ITA)	Bianchi–Ursus	Report
10 April	Tour of Flanders	Belgium	Fiorenzo Magni (ITA)	Ganna–Ursus	Report
13 April	La Flèche Wallonne	Belgium	Rik Van Steenbergen (BEL)	Mercier–Hutchinson	Report
17 April	Paris–Roubaix	France	Serse Coppi (ITA) and André Mahé (FRA)	Bianchi–Ursus/Stella–Dunlop	Report
24 April	Paris–Brussels	France/Belgium	Maurice Diot (FRA)	Mercier–Hutchinson	Report
15 May	Paris–Tours	France	Albert Ramon (BEL)	Ganna–Ursus	Report
21 May – 12 June	Giro d'Italia	Italy	Fausto Coppi (ITA)	Bianchi–Ursus	Report
30 June – 24 July	Tour de France	France	Fausto Coppi (ITA)	Italy	Report
30 July – 6 August	Tour de Suisse	Switzerland	Gottfried Weilenmann (SUI)	Wolf	Report
23 October	Giro di Lombardia	Italy	Fausto Coppi (ITA)	Bianchi–Ursus	Report

== Final standings ==
=== Riders ===
	Cyclist	Team	Points
1	Fausto Coppi (ITA)		203
2=	Gino Bartali (ITA)		115
2=	Fiorenzo Magni (ITA)		115
4	Nedo Logli (ITA)		68
5	Adolfo Leoni (ITA)		67
6	Maurice Mollin (BEL)		62
7	Giulio Bresci (ITA)		59
8	Giancarlo Astrua (ITA)		59
9	Jean Goldschmit (LUX)		56
10	Albert Ramon (BEL)		55

=== Nations ===
	Nation	Points
1	Italy	878
2	Belgium	628
3	France	621
