= 1950 Challenge Desgrange-Colombo =

- Third edition of the Challenge Desgrange-Colombo

Details
- Dates: 18 March – 22 October
- Location: Europe
- Races: 10

Champions
- Individual champion: Ferdinand Kübler (SUI) (Fréjus)
- Nations' champion: Italy

The 1950 Challenge Desgrange-Colombo was the third edition of the Challenge Desgrange-Colombo. It included ten races: all the races form the 1949 edition were retained with no additions.

== Races ==
Date	Race	Country	Winner	Team	Report
18 March	Milan–San Remo	Italy	Gino Bartali (ITA)	Bartali–Gardiol	Report
2 April	Tour of Flanders	Belgium	Fiorenzo Magni (ITA)	Ganna	Report
9 April	Paris–Roubaix	France	Fausto Coppi (ITA)	Bianchi–Ursus	Report
16 April	Paris–Brussels	France/Belgium	Rik Van Steenbergen (BEL)	Mercier–Hutchinson	Report
1 May	La Flèche Wallonne	Belgium	Fausto Coppi (ITA)	Bianchi–Ursus	Report
7 May	Paris–Tours	France	André Mahé (FRA)	Stella–Dunlop	Report
24 May – 13 June	Giro d'Italia	Italy	Hugo Koblet (SUI)	Guerra–Ursus	Report
24 June – 1 July	Tour de Suisse	Switzerland	Hugo Koblet (SUI)	Guerra–Ursus	Report
13 July – 7 August	Tour de France	France	Ferdinand Kübler (SUI)	Switzerland	Report
22 October	Giro di Lombardia	Italy	Renzo Soldani (ITA)	Thomann	Report

== Final standings ==
=== Riders ===
	Cyclist	Team	Points
1	Ferdinand Kübler (SUI)		89
2	Fiorenzo Magni (ITA)		68
3	Hugo Koblet (SUI)		60
4	Fausto Coppi (ITA)		56
5	Gino Bartali (ITA)		54
6	Raymond Impanis (BEL)		36
7	Jean Kirchen (LUX)		35
8	Stan Ockers (BEL)		34
9=	Louison Bobet (FRA)		32
9=	Guy Lapébie (FRA)		32

=== Nations ===
	Nation	Points
1	Italy	420
2	France	349
3	Belgium	300
