= Challenge Desgrange-Colombo =

Cycling competition

- Sport: Road bicycle racing
- First season: 1948
- Folded: 1958
- Replaced by: Super Prestige Pernod
- Countries: International
- Last champion: Fred De Bruyne (BEL)
- Most titles: Ferdinand Kübler (SUI); Fred De Bruyne (BEL); 3 wins each

The Challenge Desgrange-Colombo was a season-long road bicycle racing competition between 1948 and 1958. There were two classifications, one for individual cyclists and another for nations.

== History ==
The Challenge Desgrange-Colombo competition was created in 1948 to get the cyclists from two of the most dominant countries of the sport, France and Italy, to participate in each other's races. Named after long-time Tour de France director Henri Desgrange and Giro d'Italia director Emilio Colombo, the competition was organised by the newspapers L'Équipe, La Gazzetta dello Sport, Het Nieuwsblad-Sportwereld and Les Sports. It marked early co-operation between L'Équipe and La Gazzetta dello Sport which lasts to this day.

Riders' performances in the Tour de France, Giro d'Italia, Milan–San Remo, Paris–Roubaix, Tour of Flanders, La Flèche Wallonne, Paris–Brussels, Paris–Tours and the Giro di Lombardia counted towards the competition. The Tour de Suisse was added in 1949, Liège–Bastogne–Liège in 1951, the Vuelta a España in 1958.

The first winner was Belgian Briek Schotte, who won the Tour of Flanders and also world road race championship of the 1948 season. The 1949 edition was won by the Italian Fausto Coppi while 1950 went to the Swiss Ferdi Kubler and 1951 to Frenchman Louison Bobet. Kubler also won in 1952 and 1954 to equal the record of Belgian Fred De Bruyne, who won from 1956 to 1958.

The competition was effectively superseded by the Super Prestige Pernod, first awarded in 1959.

== Winners ==
Year	Individual rider	Nation
1948	Briek Schotte (BEL)	Italy
1949	Fausto Coppi (ITA)	Italy
1950	Ferdinand Kübler (SUI)	Italy
1951	Louison Bobet (FRA)	France
1952	Ferdinand Kübler (SUI)	Italy
1953	Loretto Petrucci (ITA)	Italy
1954	Ferdinand Kübler (SUI)	Belgium
1955	Stan Ockers (BEL)	Belgium
1956	Fred De Bruyne (BEL)	Belgium
1957	Fred De Bruyne (BEL)	Belgium
1958	Fred De Bruyne (BEL)	Belgium

== Bibliography ==
- Heijmans, Jeroen; Mallon, Bill (2011). Historical Dictionary of Cycling. Historical Dictionaries of Sports. Lanham, MD: Scarecrow Press. ISBN 978-0-8108-7175-5.
- MacGregor, Iain (2016). To Hell on a Bike: Riding Paris–Roubaix: the Toughest Race in Cycling. London: Transworld Publishers. ISBN 978-0-552-17131-1.
