= 1952 Liège–Bastogne–Liège =

Race details
- Dates: 11 May 1952
- Stages: 1
- Distance: 229 km (142 mi)
- Winning time: 6h 28' 08"

Results
| | Winner | Ferdinand Kübler (SUI) |
| | Second | Henri Van Kerckhove (BEL) |
| | Third | Jean Robic (FRA) |

The 1952 Liège–Bastogne–Liège was the 38th edition of the Liège–Bastogne–Liège cycle race and was held on 11 May 1952. The race started and finished in Liège. The race was won by Ferdinand Kübler.

== General classification ==
Final general classification

| Rank | Rider | Time |
|---|---|---|
| 1 | Ferdinand Kübler (SUI) | 6h 28' 08" |
| 2 | Henri Van Kerckhove (BEL) | + 0" |
| 3 | Jean Robic (FRA) | + 15" |
| 4 | Louison Bobet (FRA) | + 3' 02" |
| 5 | Jan Zagers (BEL) | + 3' 02" |
| 6 | Roger Decock (BEL) | + 3' 02" |
| 7 | Wim van Est (NED) | + 3' 02" |
| 8 | Gottfried Weilenmann (SUI) | + 3' 02" |
| 9 | Maurice Quentin (FRA) | + 3' 02" |
| 10 | Jean de Gribaldy (FRA) | + 3' 02" |
