= 1954 UCI Road World Championships =

UCI Road World Championships

- Venue: Solingen, West Germany
- Dates: 21 and 22 August
- Coordinates: 51°10′N 07°05′E
- Events: 2

The 1954 UCI Road World Championships was the 27th edition of the UCI Road World Championships. It took place on Saturday 21 and Sunday 22 August in Solingen, West Germany.

== History ==
The races took place on the Klingenring, a hilly 15-kilometre circuit near Solingen. It was the first time after World War II that the world championships were held in Germany. Rain and cold made the races extra tough.

Among the amateurs, Belgian Emiel Van Cauter won the title by a wide margin after a solo effort.

Frenchman Louison Bobet won the world professional title. Bobet had already won the Tour de France that same year. It was only the second time a rider had managed this double. His compatriot Georges Speicher did it in 1933.

In the same period, the 1954 UCI Track Cycling World Championships was organized in the Müngersdorfer Stadion in Cologne and the Stadion am Zoo in Wuppertal.

== Results ==
Event	Gold		Silver		Bronze	
Men's Events
Professional Road Race	Louison Bobet; France	7h 24' 36"	Fritz Schär; Switzerland	+ 12"	Charly Gaul; Luxembourg	+ 2' 12"
Amateur Road Race	Emiel van Cauter; Belgium	-	Hans Andresen; Denmark	-	Martin van der Borgh; Netherlands	-
