= 1958 Giro d'Italia =

Race details
- Dates: 18 May – 8 June 1958
- Stages: 20
- Distance: 3,341.1 km (2,076 mi)
- Winning time: 92h 09' 30"

Results
Jersey awarded to the overall winner	Winner	Ercole Baldini (ITA)	(Legnano)
	Second	Jean Brankart (BEL)	(Saint Raphaël)
	Third	Charly Gaul (LUX)	(Faema)
	Points	Miguel Poblet (ESP)	(Ignis)
	Mountains	Jean Brankart (BEL)	(Saint Raphaël)
	Sprints	Alessandro Fantini (ITA)	(Atala)
	Team	Carpano	

The 1958 Giro d'Italia was the 41st running of the Giro d'Italia, one of cycling's Grand Tour races. The Giro started in Milan, on 18 May, with a 178 km (110.6 mi) stage and concluded back in Milan, on 8 June, with a 177 km (110.0 mi) leg. A total of 120 riders from 15 teams entered the 20-stage race, which was won by Italian Ercole Baldini of the Legnano team. The second and third places were taken by Belgian Jean Brankart and Luxembourgian Charly Gaul, respectively.

== Teams ==
A total of 15 teams were invited to participate in the 1958 Giro d'Italia. Each team sent a squad of eight riders, so the Giro began with a peloton of 120 cyclists. Out of the 120 riders that started this edition of the Giro d'Italia, a total of 77 riders made it to the finish in Milan.

The Giro abandoned the idea of having national teams mixed with Italian teams, but instead imposed a rule that each foreign team should include at least four Italian riders. The foreign teams were not willing to do this, and considered skipping the Giro, at which point the rule was removed, and all teams were free to select riders however they wanted.

The 15 teams that took part in the race were:

- Asborno
- Atala
- Bianchi
- Cali' Broni-Girardengo
- Chlorodont
- Faema
- Carpano
- Geminiani-Saint Raphaël
- Ghigi
- Ignis
- Legnano
- Mercier B.P.-St. Vincent
- Molteni
- San Pelligrino Sport
- Torpado

== Route and stages ==
The route was released on 27 March 1958 in Saint Vincent.

The photofinish was introduced to the race, which allowed the rider's times to be determined to the hundredth of a second.

Stage results
Stage	Date	Course	Distance	Type	Winner
1	18 May	Milan to Varese	178 km (111 mi)	Plain stage	Willy Vannitsen (BEL)
2	19 May	Varese to Comerio	26 km (16 mi)	Individual time trial	Ercole Baldini (ITA)
3	20 May	Varese to Saint-Vincent	187 km (116 mi)	Plain stage	Salvador Botella (ESP)
4	21 May	Saint-Vincent to Collina di Superga	132 km (82 mi)	Stage with mountain(s)	Federico Bahamontes (ESP)
5	22 May	Turin to Mondovì	193 km (120 mi)	Stage with mountain(s)	Alfredo Sabbadin (ITA)
6	23 May	Mondovì to Chiavari	258 km (160 mi)	Stage with mountain(s)	Silvano Ciampi (ITA)
7	24 May	Chiavari to Forte dei Marmi	115 km (71 mi)	Stage with mountain(s)	Guido Boni (ITA)
	25 May	Rest day			
8	26 May	Viareggio to Viareggio	59.1 km (37 mi)	Individual time trial	Ercole Baldini (ITA)
9	27 May	Florence to Viterbo	215 km (134 mi)	Stage with mountain(s)	Nino Defilippis (ITA)
10	28 May	Viterbo to Rome	155 km (96 mi)	Plain stage	Gastone Nencini (ITA)
11	29 May	Rome to Scanno	225 km (140 mi)	Stage with mountain(s)	Nino Defilippis (ITA)
12	30 May	Scanno to San Benedetto del Tronto	211 km (131 mi)	Plain stage	Pierino Baffi (ITA)
13	31 May	San Benedetto del Tronto to Cattolica	192 km (119 mi)	Stage with mountain(s)	Guido Carlesi (ITA)
14	1 June	City of San Marino (San Marino)	12 km (7 mi)	Individual time trial	Charly Gaul (LUX)
15	2 June	Cesena to Bosco Chiesanuova	249 km (155 mi)	Stage with mountain(s)	Ercole Baldini (ITA)
16	3 June	Verona to Levico Terme	200 km (124 mi)	Plain stage	Miguel Poblet (ESP)
	4 June	Rest day			
17	5 June	Levico Terme to Bolzano	198 km (123 mi)	Stage with mountain(s)	Ercole Baldini (ITA)
18	6 June	Bolzano to Trento	183 km (114 mi)	Stage with mountain(s)	Gastone Nencini (ITA)
19	7 June	Trento to Gardone Riviera	176 km (109 mi)	Stage with mountain(s)	Miguel Poblet (ESP)
20	8 June	Salò to Milan	177 km (110 mi)	Plain stage	Miguel Poblet (ESP)
	Total		3,341.1 km (2,076 mi)		

== Classification leadership ==
One different jersey was worn during the 1958 Giro d'Italia. The leader of the general classification – calculated by adding the stage finish times of each rider – wore a pink jersey. This classification is the most important of the race, and its winner is considered as the winner of the Giro. There were no time bonuses in 1958.

For the first time, there was a points classification in the Giro. It was a continuation of the previous year's piste classification, but now extended to all stage, not only stages ending on a velodrome. There was no jersey given to its leader, cyclists were given points for finishing a stage in the top 15. This classification was also known as the Trofeo A. Carli.

A secondary classification was the mountains classification. The climbs were ranked in first and second categories. In this ranking, points were won by reaching the summit of a climb ahead of other cyclists.

There was an intermediate sprints classification. The first three riders at each intermediate sprint received points, 5 for the winner down to 1 for the third.

Although no jersey was awarded, there was also one classification for the teams, in which the stage finish times of the best three cyclists per team were added; the leading team was the one with the lowest total time.

Classification leadership by stage
Stage	Winner	General classification	Points classification	Mountains classification	Intermediate sprints classification	Team classification
1	Willy Vannitsen	Willy Vannitsen	Willy Vannitsen	not awarded	Carlo Zorzoli	Ghigi
2	Ercole Baldini	Ercole Baldini	Miguel Poblet	not awarded	Carlo Zorzoli	Legnano
3	Salvador Botella	Arnaldo Pambianco	Miguel Poblet	not awarded	Vito Favero	Faema
4	Federico Bahamontes	Aldo Moser	Miguel Poblet	Federico Bahamontes	Carlo Zorzoli	Faema
5	Alfredo Sabbadin	Salvador Botella	Miguel Poblet	Federico Bahamontes	Carlo Zorzoli	Faema
6	Silvano Ciampi	Giovanni Pettinati	Miguel Poblet	Federico Bahamontes	Carlo Zorzoli	Faema
7	Guido Boni	Giovanni Pettinati	Miguel Poblet	Federico Bahamontes	Carlo Zorzoli	Faema
8	Ercole Baldini	Giovanni Pettinati	Miguel Poblet	Federico Bahamontes	Vito Favero	Faema
9	Nino Defilippis	Giovanni Pettinati	Miguel Poblet	Federico Bahamontes	Vito Favero	Faema
10	Gastone Nencini	Giovanni Pettinati	Miguel Poblet	Federico Bahamontes	Vito Favero	Faema
11	Nino Defilippis	Giovanni Pettinati	Miguel Poblet	Federico Bahamontes	Vito Favero	Faema
12	Pierino Baffi	Agostino Coletto	Miguel Poblet	Federico Bahamontes	Alessandro Fantini	Faema
13	Guido Carlesi	Agostino Coletto	Miguel Poblet	Federico Bahamontes	Alessandro Fantini	Carpano
14	Charly Gaul	Agostino Coletto	Miguel Poblet	Federico Bahamontes	Alessandro Fantini	Carpano
15	Ercole Baldini	Ercole Baldini	Miguel Poblet	Federico Bahamontes	Alessandro Fantini	Carpano
16	Miguel Poblet	Ercole Baldini	Miguel Poblet	Federico Bahamontes	Alessandro Fantini	Carpano
17	Ercole Baldini	Ercole Baldini	Miguel Poblet	Jean Brankart	Alessandro Fantini	Carpano
18	Gastone Nencini	Ercole Baldini	Miguel Poblet	Jean Brankart	Vito Favero	Carpano
19	Miguel Poblet	Ercole Baldini	Miguel Poblet	Jean Brankart	Alessandro Fantini	Carpano
20	Miguel Poblet	Ercole Baldini	Miguel Poblet	Jean Brankart	Alessandro Fantini	Carpano
Final		Ercole Baldini	Miguel Poblet	Jean Brankart	Alessandro Fantini	Carpano

== Final standings ==
Legend
Pink jersey	Denotes the winner of the General classification

=== General classification ===
Final general classification (1–10)
Rank	Name	Team	Time
1	Ercole Baldini (ITA)	Legnano	92h 9' 30"
2	Jean Brankart (BEL)	St. Raphaël	+ 4' 17"
3	Charly Gaul (LUX)	Faema	+ 6' 07"
4	Louison Bobet (FRA)	Mercier	+ 9' 27"
5	Gastone Nencini (ITA)	Chlorodant	+ 10' 36"
6	Miguel Poblet (ESP)	Ignis	+ 11' 07"
7	Jesús Loroño (ESP)	Faema	+ 12' 12"
8	Raphaël Géminiani (FRA)	St. Raphaël	+ 13' 12"
9	Pasquale Fornara (ITA)	Ignis	+ 14' 13"
10	Aldo Moser (ITA)	Cali	+ 15' 00"

=== Mountains classification ===
Final mountains classification (1–5)
	Name	Team	Points
1	Jean Brankart (BEL)	St. Raphaël	56
2	Ercole Baldini (ITA)	Legnano	39
3	Charly Gaul (LUX)	Faema	38
4	Federico Bahamontes (ESP)	Faema	37
5	Nino Defilippis (ITA)	Carpano	19

=== Points classification ===
Final points classification (1–5)
	Name	Team	Points
1	Miguel Poblet (ESP)	Ignis	182
2	Ercole Baldini (ITA)	Legnano	144
3	Jean Brankart (BEL)	St. Raphaël	111
4	Gastone Nencini (ITA)	Chlorodant	96
5	Nino Defilippis (ITA)	Carpano	82.5
6	Giuseppe Fallarini (ITA)	Asborno	81
7	Louison Bobet (FRA)	Mercier	80
8	Charly Gaul (LUX)	Faema	77
9	Josef Planckaert (BEL)	Carpano	70
9	Rino Benedetti (ITA)	Cali	70

=== Intermediate sprints classification ===
Final intermediate sprints classification (1–9)
	Name	Team	Points
1	Alessandro Fantini (ITA)	Atala	35
2	Vito Favero (ITA)	Atala	28
3	Pierino Baffi (ITA)	Chlorodont	21
4	Miguel Poblet (ESP)	Ignis	18
5	Giorgio Menini (ITA)	San Pellegrino	13
6	Mario Baroni (ITA)	Torpado	10
7	Nino Catalano (ITA)	Cali	8
8	Guido Carlesi (ITA)	Chlorodont	6
9	Waldemaro Bartolozzi (ITA)	Legnano	5
9	Guido Boni (ITA)	Bianchi	5
9	Jesús Galdeano (ESP)	Faema	5
9	Cleto Maule (ITA)	Torpado	5
9	Federico Bahamontes (ESP)	Faema	5
9	Bruno Tognaccini (ITA)	Ignis	5
9	Giuseppe Pintarelli (ITA)	Cali	5
9	Armando Pellegrini (ITA)	Faema	5

=== Team classification ===
Final team classification (1–7)
	Team	Time
1	Carpano	276h 41' 22"
2	Faema	+ 6' 13"
3	St. Raphaël	+ 41' 23"
4	San Pellegrino	+ 53' 08"
5	Atala	+ 1h 04' 32"
6	Legnano	+ 1h 15' 56"
7	Ignis	+ 1h 21' 48"

=== Minor awards ===
The race jury and the director established a classification for awards "on merit", which Giorgio Menini (San Pellegrino) won with six points. With this classification victory, Menini won 300,000 lire. Guido Boni (Bianchi), Guido Carlesi (Chlorodont), Alfredo Zagano (Asborno), Jesús Galdeano (Faema), and Gianni Ferlenghi (Bianchi) placed second in the classification and split 300,000 lire.
