= Giuseppe Minardi =

Italian cyclist (1928–2019)

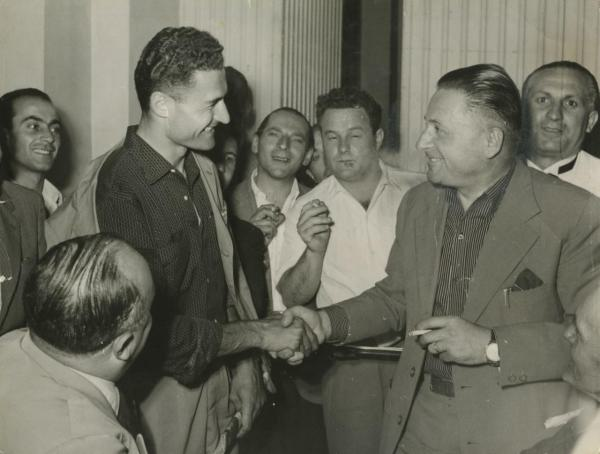
- Giuseppe Minardi, left, with Alfredo Binda (1953)

Personal information
- Born: 18 March 1928 Solarolo, Italy
- Died: 21 January 2019 (aged 90) Faenza, Italy

Cycling career
- Sport: Cycling
- Role: Rider

Major wins
- Grand Tours Giro d'Italia 6 individual stage (1951, 1952, 1953, 1954, 1955, 1956) 1 TTT stage (1956) One-day races and Classics Giro di Lombardia (1952)

Giuseppe Minardi (18 March 1928 – 21 January 2019) was an Italian racing cyclist. He won the 1952 edition of the Giro di Lombardia.

== Major results ==
1949
1st Trofeo Matteotti
1950
4th Giro della Romagna
8th Giro di Lombardia
9th Giro dell'Emilia
1951
1st Trofeo Baracchi (shared with Fiorenzo Magni)
1st Stage 10 Giro d'Italia
2nd Giro di Lombardia
2nd Giro di Toscana
5th Tre Valli Varesine
8th Road race, UCI Road World Championships
10th Giro dell'Emilia
1952
1st Giro di Lombardia
1st Tre Valli Varesine
1st Giro di Campania
1st Stage 15 Giro d'Italia
2nd Road race, National Road Championships
2nd Milan–San Remo
2nd Giro dell'Emilia
2nd Trofeo Baracchi
2nd Giro dell'Appennino
3rd Giro di Romagna
3rd Giro della Provincia di reggio Calabria
1953
1st Stage 6 Giro d'Italia
1st Stage 2a Roma–Napoli–Roma
2nd Milan–San Remo
7th Giro del Veneto
10th Giro del Lazio
1954
1st Giro della Romagna
1st Giro della Provincia di reggio Calabria
1st Stage 2 Giro d'Italia
3rd Road race, National Road Championships
3rd Tre Valli Varesine
6th Giro dell'Emilia
7th Giro del Lazio
1955
1st Giro del Piemonte
1st Trofeo Matteotti
1st Stage 14 Giro d'Italia
2nd Road race, National Road Championships
3rd Tre Valli Varesine
5th Giro della Romagna
8th Overall Roma–Napoli–Roma
1956
1st Giro della Provincia di reggio Calabria
Giro d'Italia

1st Stages 2b (TTT) & 5a

2nd Giro della Romagna
3rd Tre Valli Varesine
7th Giro di Toscana
