= 1958 UCI Road World Championships =

- Official program

- Venue: Reims, France
- Date: 30-31 August 1958
- Coordinates: 49°15′46″N 4°02′05″E
- Events: 3

The 1958 UCI Road World Championships was the 31st edition of the UCI Road World Championships.

It took place from 30-31 August 1958 in Reims, France. The course partly ran over the Reims-Gueux circuit.

For the first time, a women's world championship was on the program. The race, with a course of 59 km (3 rounds), was won by Elsy Jacobs from Luxembourg with almost a three-minute lead. There were 29 participants.

The world title among the amateurs, who also rode on Saturday, went to the East German Gustav-Adolf Schur. He was the first German to become world amateur champion.

The men's professional road race had a course of 276 km (14 rounds). It was won by Italian Ercole Baldini.

In the same period, the 1958 UCI Track Cycling World Championships were organized in the Parc des Princes, Paris, France.

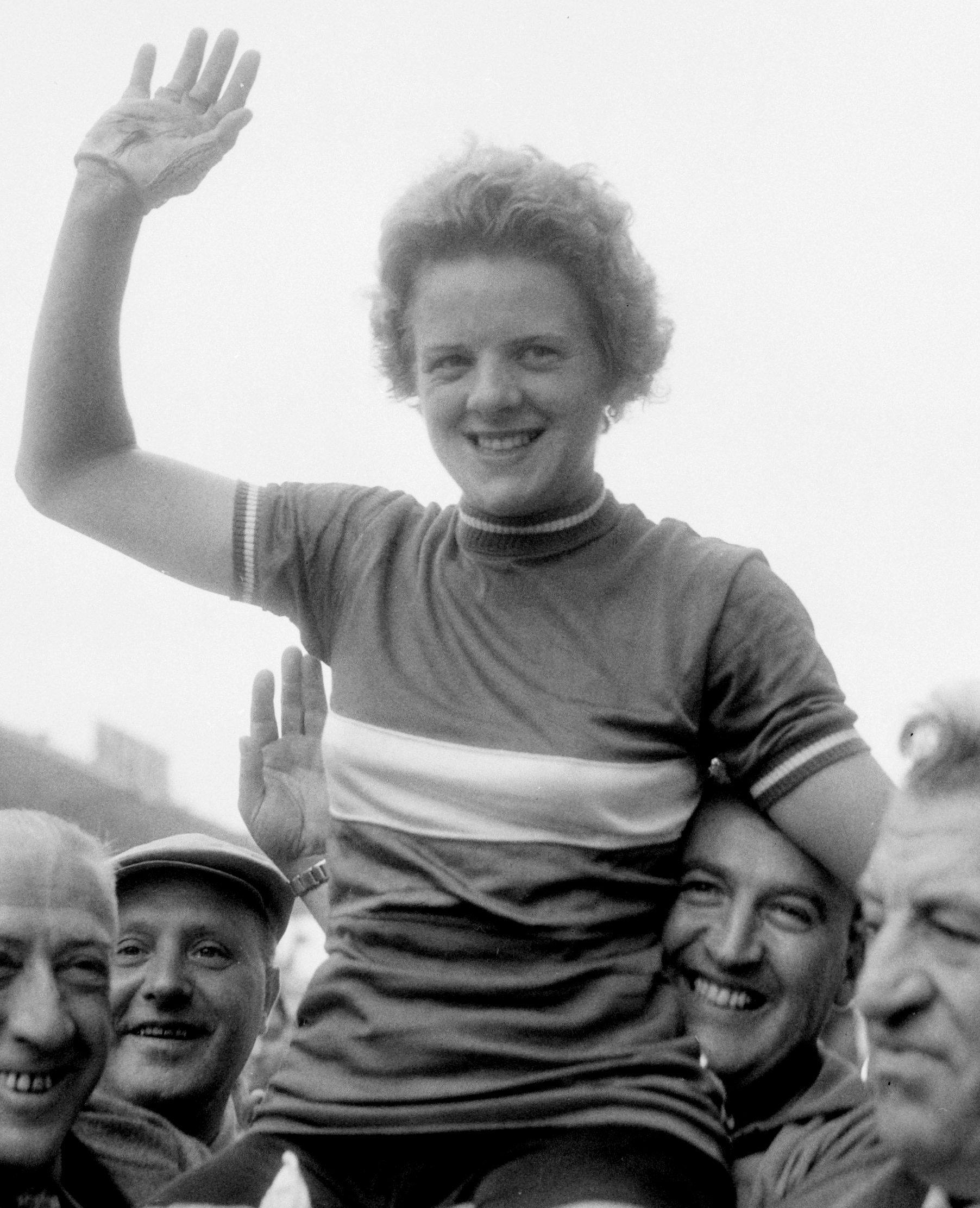
Elsy Jacobs after winning the woman's amateur road race

== Events summary ==
Event	Gold		Silver		Bronze	
Men's events
Professional road race	Ercole Baldini; Italy	7h 29' 32"	Louison Bobet; France	+ 2' 09"	André Darrigade; France	+ 3' 47"
Amateur road race	Gustav-Adolf Schur; East Germany	-	Valere Paulissen; Belgium	-	Henri Dewolf; Belgium	-
Women's events
Road race	Elsy Jacobs; Luxembourg	1h 50' 05"	Tamara Novikova; Soviet Union	+ 2' 51"	Mariya Lukshina; Soviet Union	s.t.
