= Rinaldo Moresco =

Italian cyclist (born 1925)

Personal information
- Born: 25 January 1925 Bargagli, Italy

Cycling career
- Sport: Cycling
- Discipline: Road
- Role: Rider

Professional teams
- 1950–1951: Wilier Triestina
- 1951–1953: Arbos
- 1954: Fiorelli

Rinaldo Moresco (born 25 January 1925) was an Italian professional road cyclist. Professional from 1950 to 1956, he had several successes during his career, including winning the Giro dell'Appennino in 1951 and the Giro di Toscana the following year.

== Major results ==
1950
1st Stages 1 & 3 Giro di Sicilia
1951
1st Giro dell'Appennino
2nd Giro del Lazio
2nd Trofeo Matteotti
1952
1st Giro di Toscana
3rd Road race, National Road Championships
3rd Giro dell'Appennino
10th Milan–San Remo
1953
5th Giro della Provincia di Reggio Calabria
8th Giro dell'Emilia
10th Giro del Veneto
1954
4th Tre Valli Varesine
