= 1957 Liège–Bastogne–Liège =

Race details
- Dates: 5 May 1957
- Stages: 1
- Distance: 256 km (159 mi)
- Winning time: 7h 24' 56"

Results
	Winner	Frans Schoubben (BEL); Germain Derycke (BEL)
	Third	Marcel Buys (BEL)

The 1957 Liège–Bastogne–Liège was the 43rd edition of the Liège–Bastogne–Liège cycle race and was held on 5 May 1957. The race started and finished in Liège. The race was won by two riders, Frans Schoubben and Germain Derycke.

Germain Derycke was first over the line, but because he crossed a closed rail crossing, the second-place rider, Frans Schoubben, was promoted to first as well. Derijcke was not disqualified, because he had won by three minutes advantage; judges felt he had not gained that much time from illegally crossing the railway.

== General classification ==
Final general classification

Rank	Rider	Time
1	Frans Schoubben (BEL)	7h 24' 56"
1	Germain Derycke (BEL)	0"
3	Marcel Buys (BEL)	+ 2' 46"
4	Martin Van Geneugden (BEL)	+ 5' 37"
5	Jef Planckaert (BEL)	+ 7' 04"
6	Jan Zagers (BEL)	+ 7' 04"
7	Ernest Heyvaert (BEL)	+ 7' 53"
8	Sante Ranucci (ITA)	+ 8' 11"
9	Louison Bobet (FRA)	+ 13' 30"
10	Joseph Theuns (BEL)	+ 13' 48"
