= 1956 Paris–Tours =

Race details
- Dates: 7 October 1956
- Stages: 1
- Distance: 251 km (156.0 mi)
- Winning time: 6h 08' 43"

Results
	Winner	Albert Bouvet (FRA)
	Second	Julien Schepens (BEL)
	Third	Louison Bobet (FRA)

The 1956 Paris–Tours was the 50th edition of the Paris–Tours cycle race and was held on 7 October 1956. The race started in Paris and finished in Tours. The race was won by Albert Bouvet.

== General classification ==
Final general classification

Rank	Rider	Time
1	Albert Bouvet (FRA)	6h 08' 43"
2	Julien Schepens (BEL)	+ 0"
3	Louison Bobet (FRA)	+ 0"
4	Fred De Bruyne (BEL)	+ 0"
5	Albert Dolhats (FRA)	+ 0"
6	Miguel Poblet (ESP)	+ 0"
7	Edgard Sorgeloos (BEL)	+ 0"
8	Joseph Groussard (FRA)	+ 0"
9	Michel Van Aerde (BEL)	+ 0"
10	Henri Denys (BEL)	+ 0"
