= 1953 Milan–San Remo =

Race details
- Dates: 19 March 1953
- Stages: 1
- Distance: 282 km (175 mi)
- Winning time: 6h 59' 20"

Results
	Winner	Loretto Petrucci (ITA)
	Second	Giuseppe Minardi (ITA)
	Third	Valère Ollivier (BEL)

The 1953 Milan–San Remo was the 44th edition of the Milan–San Remo cycle race and was held on 19 March 1953. The race started in Milan and finished in San Remo. The race was won by Loretto Petrucci.

== General classification ==
Final general classification

Rank	Rider	Time
1	Loretto Petrucci (ITA)	6h 59' 20"
2	Giuseppe Minardi (ITA)	+ 0"
3	Valère Ollivier (BEL)	+ 0"
4	Germain Derycke (BEL)	+ 0"
5	Nino Defilippis (ITA)	+ 0"
6	Raymond Impanis (BEL)	+ 0"
7	Jean Robic (FRA)	+ 21"
8	Roger Walkowiak (FRA)	+ 21"
9	Fausto Coppi (ITA)	+ 1' 05"
10	Ferdinand Kübler (SUI)	+ 1' 09"
