= Pierre Michel (cyclist) =

French cyclist (1929–2023)

Personal information
- Born: 16 November 1929 Castilly, Calvados, France
- Died: 10 November 2023 (aged 93) Caen, France

Cycling career
- Sport: Cycling

Pierre Michel (16 November 1929 – 10 November 2023) was a French cyclist. He competed in the 4,000 metres team pursuit event at the 1952 Summer Olympics. Michel died in Caen on 10 November 2023, at the age of 93.
