= Charly Gaul =

Luxembourgish cyclist

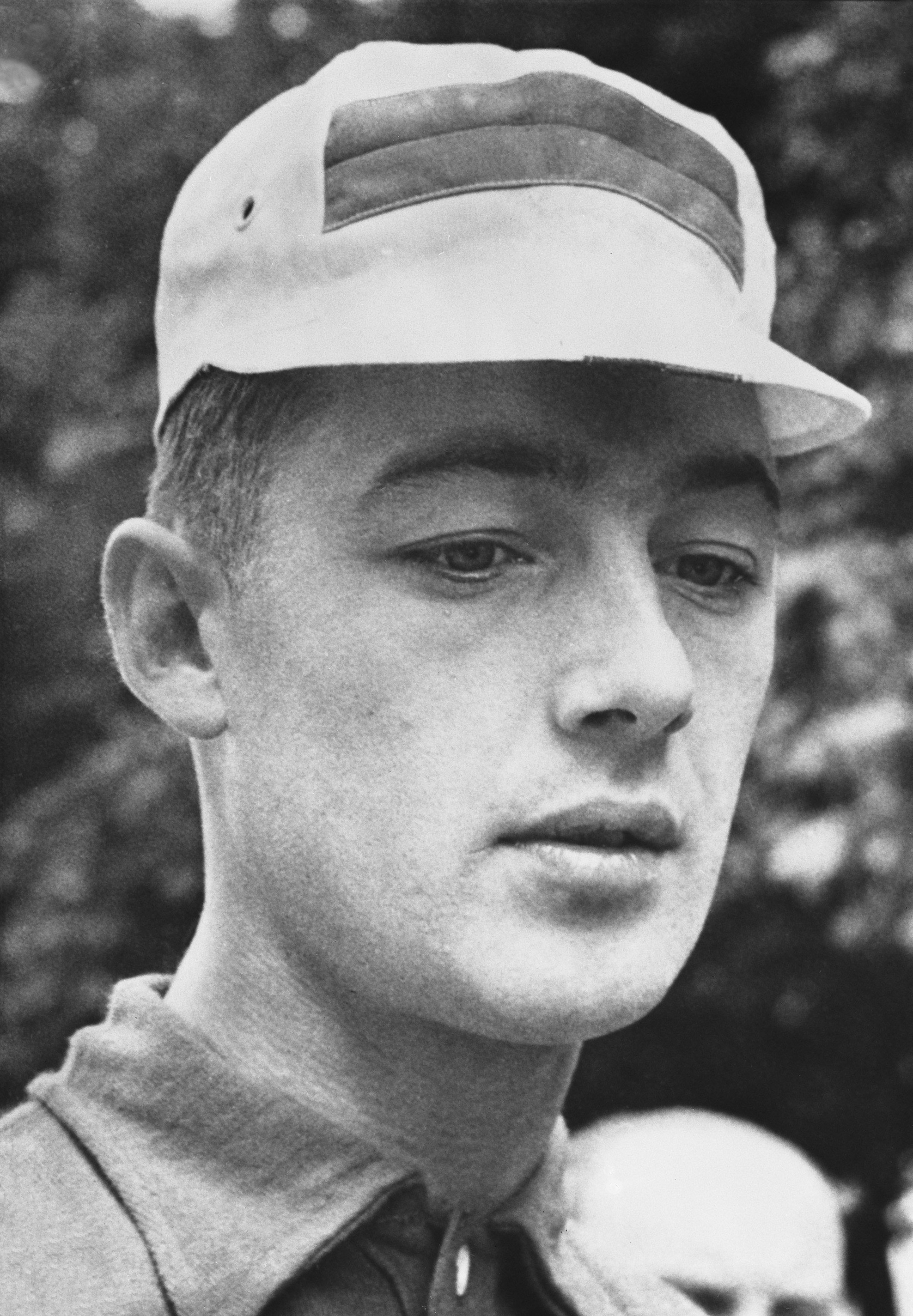
- Gaul in 1959

Personal information
- Full name: Charly Gaul
- Nicknames: L'ange de la montagne (Angel of the Mountains); Rimbaud du tour Chéri-pipi
- Born: 8 December 1932 Pfaffenthal, Luxembourg
- Died: 6 December 2005 (aged 72) Luxembourg City, Luxembourg
- Height: 1.73 m (5 ft 8 in)
- Weight: 64 kg (141 lb)

Cycling career
- Sport: Cycling
- Disciplines: Road and cyclo-cross
- Role: Rider
- Rider type: Climbing specialist

Professional teams
- 1953–1954: Terrot–Hutchinson
- 1955: Magnat-Debon
- 1956–1958: Faema–Guerra
- 1959–1960: EMI
- 1961–1963: Gazzola–Fiorelli
- 1963: Peugeot–BP–Englebert
- 1964: Individual
- 1965: Lamot–Libertas

Major wins
- Grand Tours Tour de France General classification (1958) Mountains classification (1955, 1956) 10 individual stages (1955, 1956, 1958, 1959, 1961) Giro d'Italia General classification (1956, 1959) Mountains classification (1956, 1959) 11 individual stages (1956–1961)
Medal record
Representing Luxembourg
Men's road bicycle racing
World Championships
Bronze medal – third place	1954 Solingen	Road race

Charly Gaul /ˈɡaʊl/ (8 December 1932 – 6 December 2005) was a Luxembourgish professional cyclist. He was a national cyclo-cross champion, an accomplished time triallist and superb climber. His ability earned him the nickname of Angel of the Mountains in the 1958 Tour de France, which he won with four stage victories. He also won the Giro d'Italia in 1956 and 1959. Gaul rode best in cold, wet weather. In later life, he became a recluse and lost much of his memory.

== Early life and amateur career ==
Gaul was a fragile-looking man with a sad face and disproportionately short legs. As one writer put it, he had "a sad, timid look on his face, marked with an unfathomable melancholy [as though] an evil deity has forced him into a cursed profession amidst powerful, implacable riders."

Gaul worked in a butcher's shop and as a slaughterman in an abattoir at Bettembourg before turning professional on 3 May 1953 for Terrot, at the age of 20. By then, he had already won more than 60 races as an amateur having started racing in 1949. They included the Flêche du Sud and the Tour of the 12 Cantons. He won a stage up the climb of Grossglockner during the Tour of Austria when he was 17, setting a stage record. It was his first race outside Luxembourg.

His first professional race was the Critérium de la Polymultipliée, which he finished eighth. His first professional win was in 1953 in Luxembourg, in the national cyclo-cross championship. He came second the same year in the Critérium du Dauphiné Libéré stage race. The following year he was second in the Luxembourg road championship (which he won six times), won a stage in the Dauphiné Libéré, and won a bronze medal in the 1954 world championship.

== Professional career ==
=== Tour de France ===
Gaul rode his first Tour de France in 1953 but abandoned on the sixth stage. He also started the 1954 Tour but again abandoned before the finish. He came to the 1955 Tour after winning the mountainous Tour de Sud Ouest and finishing third in the Tour of Luxembourg. He conceded a lot of time on the opening flat stages, not helped by being in a weak team. His fight back started in the Alps, where the first stage was from Thonon-les-Bains to Briançon. He attacked and dropped the Dutch climber, Jan Nolten. Crossing the col du Télégraphe, he had five minutes on his chasers; by the top of the Galibier he had 14m 47s. By the finish, he had moved from 37th to third. He was on his way to winning the next day as well, when he crashed descending in the rain. He attacked again when the race reached the Pyrenees, winning stage 17 from (Toulouse to Saint-Gaudens) ahead of the eventual overall winner, Louison Bobet. He won the mountains competition and finished third in Paris.

After a hard-fought victory in the 1956 Giro d'Italia (in which he took three stages, including an eight-minute victory in the Dolomites stage from Meran to Monte Bondone, near Trento), Gaul was almost half an hour down after six days' racing in the 1956 Tour de France, but he was confident he could close the gap in the mountains. He won the mountains prize again and two more stages, a mountain individual time trial on stage three and stage 18 to Grenoble, but his efforts did little good, and he finished 13th.

Gaul started the 1957 Tour but abandoned after two days with no stage wins.

==== 1958 ====
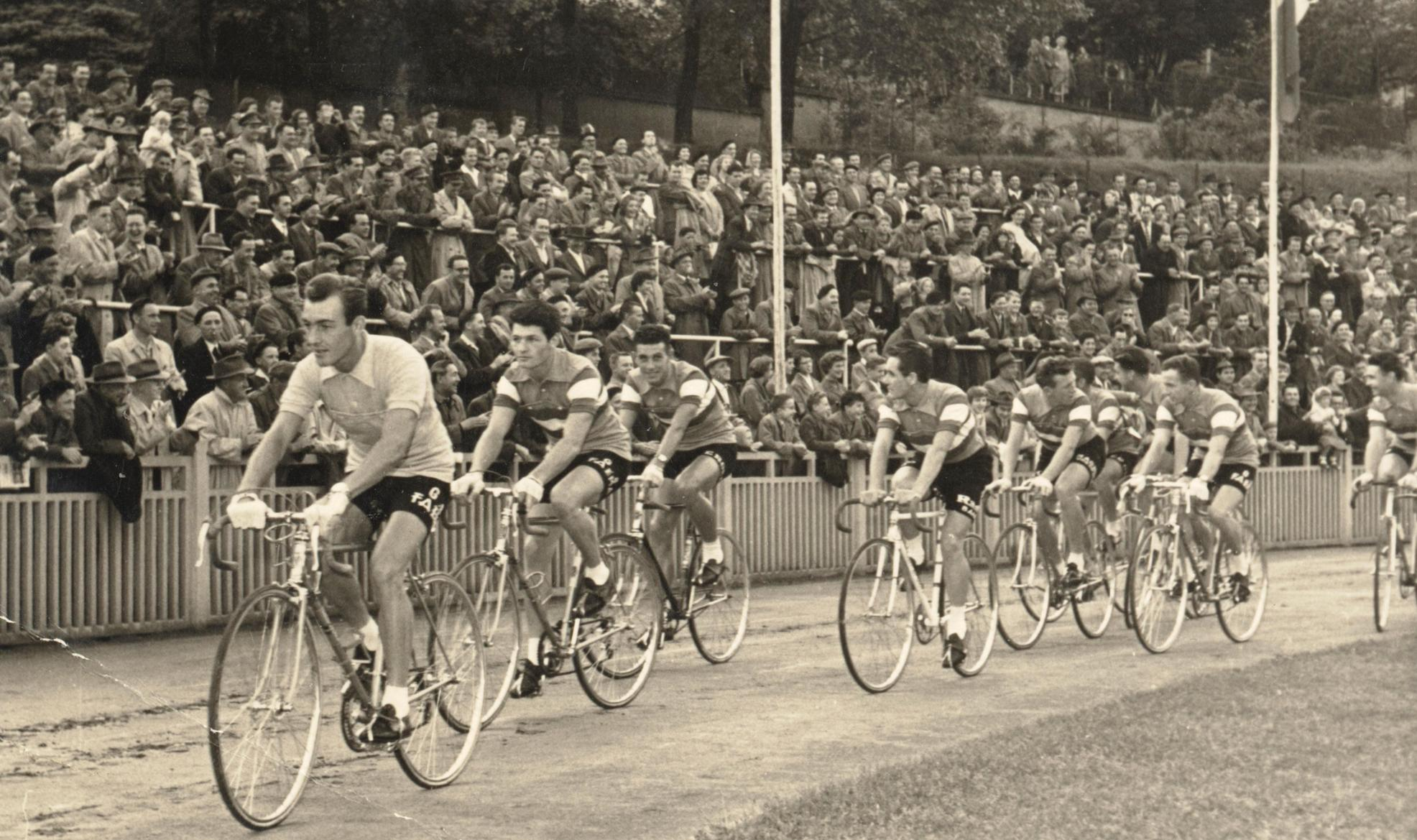
Gaul (left) wearing the race leader's yellow jersey at the 1958 Tour de France, leading the combined Netherlands and Luxembourg team

Gaul returned to the Tour in 1958. Third in that year's Giro, he started dominantly and won four stages, three of them time trials, including the ascent of Mont Ventoux. His time of 1h 2m 9s from the Bédoin side, which in those days was cobbled in the first kilometres and poorly surfaced to the summit, stood as a record until Jonathan Vaughters beat it 41 years later in the Dauphiné Libéré. (Note: Vaughters broke the record for the ascent of Mont Ventoux with 26 other riders, timed in 56m 50s. Gaul was there to see it happen and had forecast the fastest would take less than an hour. He told Cycle Sport in August 1999: "I am glad that my record will fall. That's what records are there for, to be beaten. The road is pretty similar, slightly better surfaced, but the equipment is better, too. That is bound to have an effect. I can remember that, like today, it was very hot and I was worried about that because I didn't respond well to the heat." The last time Gaul had tried the climb, he said it took "a whole two hours.")

On the last day in the Alps, his manager, Jo Goldschmidt (Note: Jo Goldschmit's first name was Jean but he was always referred to as Jo.) looked at the rain falling and woke Gaul with the words: "Come on soldier... This is your day." Gaul woke delighted at the cold rain and angry at the memory of how he had been denied the Giro the previous year, when he was attacked as he stopped by the roadside. A lot of riders took advantage of his halt but he most blamed Bobet, a man as refined and diffident as Gaul was coarse and brusque. Historian Bill McGann said his feelings for Bobet had turned to "flaming hatred." He sought out his tormentor before the stage started. The impact was all the greater because the two had barely spoken to each other since the Giro. Asking whether he was ready ("You're ready, Monsieur Bobet?"), he laid emphasis on the false politeness of the monsieur and continued: "I'll give you a chance. I'll attack on the Luitel climb. I'll even tell you which hairpin. You want to win the Tour more than I do? Easy. I've told you what you need to know."

There was a prize of 100.00 francs at the top of the col de Lautaret in memory of the race's founder, Henri Desgrange. The Dutchman Piet van Est won it, with Bahamontes behind him. A small group broke clear on the descent and had eight minutes on the rest. Gaul began the chase and shed rider after rider, including the Spaniard, Salvador Botella, who held eighth place. Botella stopped, covered his head in his hands and wept. Teammates turned back to encourage him; he burst into tears again when he saw them and climbed into the race ambulance. Gaul and Bahamontes dropped the rest. At first the rest thought that Gaul had lost too much time earlier in the race to be a threat, that he was looking only at the best climber's prize. On the climb to the col de Luitel, Gaul dropped Bahamontes as well. He was within three minutes of the leaders at the top, with Bahamontes a minute behind. Gaul took the lead and moved ahead as the race progressed through "a curtain of water, a deluge without an ark", as L'Équipe described it. Michel Clare, reporting for the paper, said: "I was on a motorbike and I had to stop at Granier for a hot grog. I was so cold that afterwards it was an hour before I could start writing." When he finally began his report in the press room at Aix-les-Bains, he wrote: "I remember only a curtain of rain. A deluge without an Ark. The caravan (Note: "The caravan" is a term used for the procession of vehicles preceding and following the race.) dissolved from the moment it entered the sea of clouds that followed the pretty chalets of [the ski station of] Chamrousse. Now we know what it means to be 'soaked to the bone.' I thought of Jacques Anquetil, whose face was becoming more and more triangular and yellow. I thought of them all, the known and the unknown, sailors carried away by the flood and who tried desperately to avoid being shipwrecked. One man escaped from the storm. Charly Gaul. Finally, his time had come." Gaul crossed the line at the lake in Bourget-en-Aix in near darkness with a slight smile, 12m 20s ahead of the chasing group and 15 minutes ahead of the leader, Raphaël Géminiani. (Note: When Gaul crossed the line in Bourget-en-Aix, it was dark enough that the streetlights had come on and cars and motorcycles were using their headlights. The finish line had begun to wash away in the rain.)

It moved him to third place, and two days later Gaul got those 67 seconds and more in a time-trial on a difficult circuit at Châteaulin, riding at 44.2kmh. There, he beat even Anquetil, who was suffering a lung infection after the rainy ride to Bourget-en-Aix. (Note: The 1958 Tour de France became known as the Judas Tour. Raphaël Géminiani and Louison Bobet chased after Gaul, and Géminiani asked his fellow Frenchman to help, but Bobet could not or would not. He had a fragile personality, was suffering, and was quite possibly demoralised by Gaul's taunting. Géminiani was a good climber but not in Gaul's class. Géminiani lost his lead by a quarter of an hour and accused Bobet publicly of betraying him, calling him "Judas.")

==== 1959 ====
In 1959, he was 12th. He lost time in the heat of the Pyrenees but won the stage to Grenoble again, with the eventual overall winner Bahamontes second.

==== Late Tours ====
Gaul missed the 1960 Tour. In 1961, he came third and won stage nine to Grenoble. He crashed in the Alps, on the descent of the Cucheron, bruising his hip, shoulder and knee. At the beginning of the final stage, he was second to Anquetil. Guido Carlesi attacked as the Tour entered its final kilometre, overcoming a four-second deficit to Gaul. This moved him to second, relegating Gaul to third.

In 1962, he finished ninth with no stage victories. The 1962 Tour was contested by trade rather than national teams for the first time since 1929, and Gaul's was not one of the strongest. His final contested Tour was 1963, when he dropped out without winning any stages.

=== Giro d'Italia ===
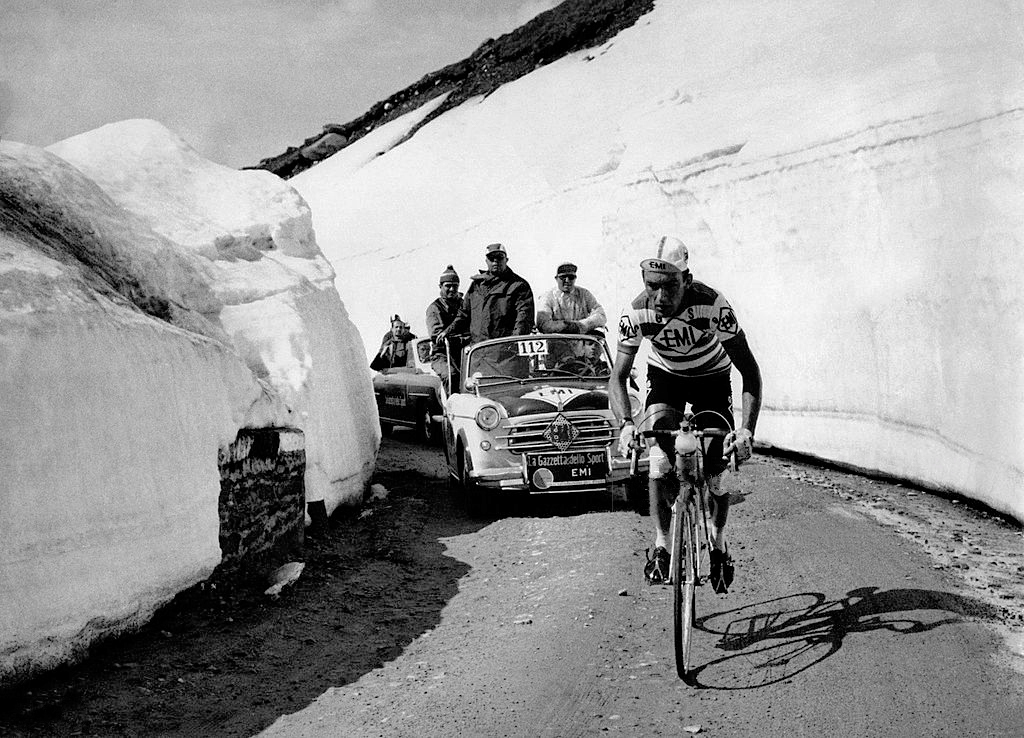
Gaul at the 1959 Giro d'Italia

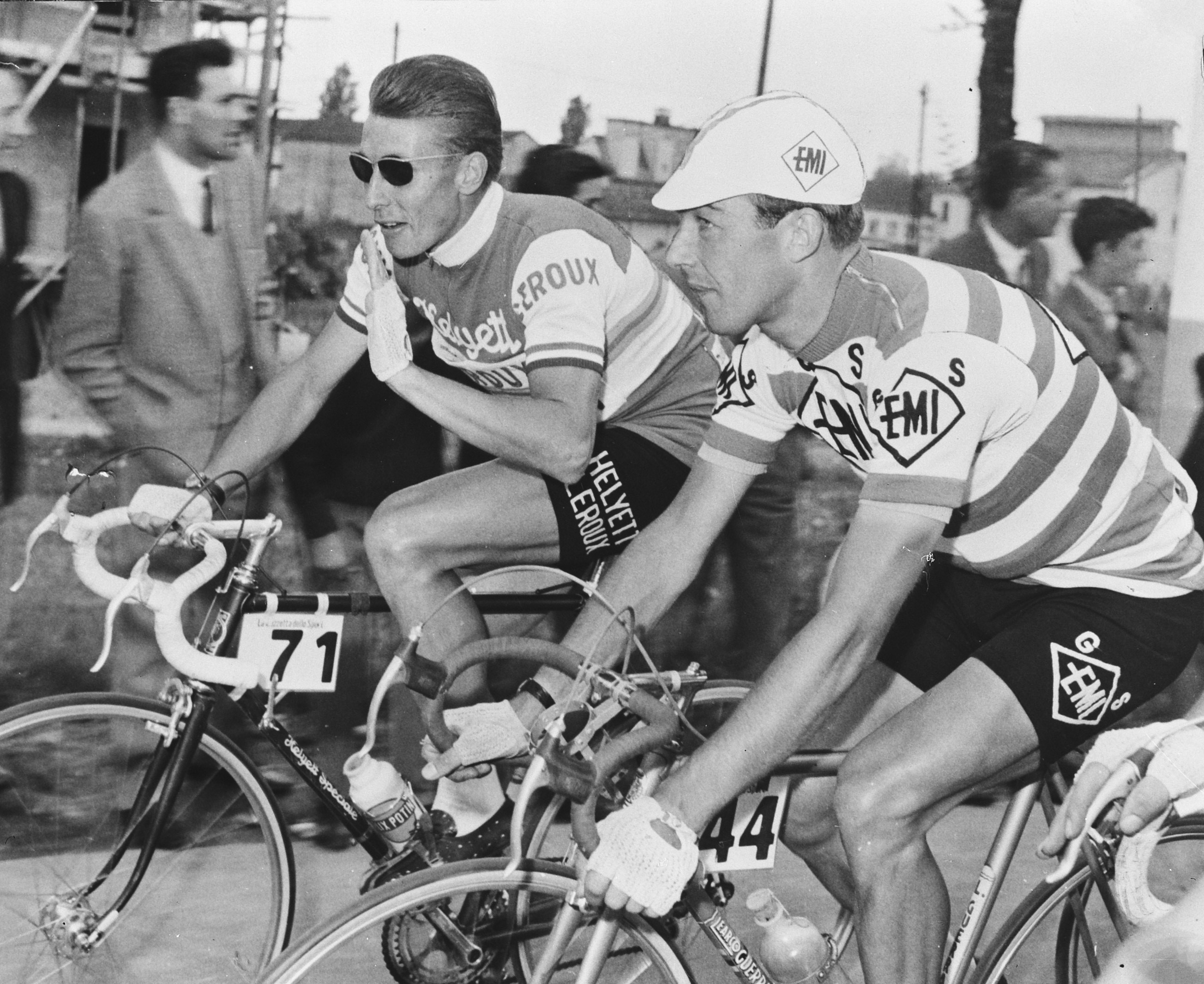
Jacques Anquetil and Gaul at the 1959 Giro d'Italia

Gaul won the Giro d'Italia in 1956 and 1959. His victory in 1956 came after leaving the field in the climb of Monte Bondone at 1,300m. Snow fell and Gaul was alone with 88 km to go. It was so cold that he had to be carried off his bike at the finish and stopped on the way up for a drink.

On the stage victory to Courmayeur, he took a 10-minute advantage over Anquetil on the final two climbs. Gaul lost the 1957 Giro after stopping for what was described in French papers as "a natural need" on the road to Trieste. His rivals, particularly Bobet and Gastone Nencini, attacked. Gaul was upset at a breach of race etiquette and still more annoyed to find himself referred to as Monsieur Pi-Pi, which in French rhymes with and means pee-pee. Gaul rounded on Bobet and said: "I will get my revenge. I will kill you. Remember I was a butcher. I know how to use a knife." It was that that sparked the attack in the following year's Tour de France.

In the 1960 Giro, he won a stage on his way to third place. In 1961, he finished fourth.

=== Cyclo-cross ===
Gaul was national cyclo-cross champion at the start and the end of his time as a professional. He also came fifth in the world championships of 1956 and 1962. He won in Dippach in 1955, Kopstal, Colmar-Berg and Bettembourg in 1956, Schuttrange, Ettelbruck, Kopstal, Bissen and Colmar-Berg in 1957, Alzingen in 1958, and Muhlenbach in 1960.

=== Final years ===
Gaul's career effectively ended with the Tour de France in 1962. Philippe Brunel said: "Without knowing it, he was climbing the slope of his own decline. He grumbled as he climbed the Pyrenees and his eyes were flecked with blood." At Saint-Gaudens, after his faithful teammate and roommate Marcel Ernzer had dropped out, he spoke of his lassitude, saying: "I'm scared in the peloton [...]. The abuse of stimulants, the fatigue [make riders] clumsy. How many of them have got the reflexes that they need?" Gaul was never the same. At the end of the season, he left the Gazzola team, tried Peugeot (which came to nothing), a comeback (equally nothing) in the Lamote-Libertas team."

Gaul stopped for good after a track meeting at Niederkorn in 1965. He never recovered from the hurt of being whistled by the crowd when he made his last appearance on the road in the country, riding for a poor team, Lamote, sponsored by a Belgian brewery and achieving nothing. He ran a café at Bonnevoie near the railway station in Luxembourg city before slipping out of public view.

== Riding style and personality ==
Gaul was 1.73 m tall and weighed 64 kg. His lightness was a gift in the mountains, where he won the climbers' competition in the Tour de France of 1955 and 1956. Unusual for a light man, he was also an accomplished time-trialist, in one Tour de France beating the world leader, Jacques Anquetil. Gaul pedalled fast on climbs, rarely changing his pace, infrequently getting out of the saddle. His contemporary, Raphaël Géminiani, said Gaul was "a murderous climber, always the same sustained rhythm, a little machine with a lower gear than the rest, turning his legs at a speed that would break your heart, tick tock, tick tock, tick tock." The journalist Pierre About wrote that Gaul had "irresistible sprightliness [allegresse]", and had "the air of an angel for which nothing is difficult."

The writer Jan Heine said: "Nobody else ever climbed that fast. Gaul dominated the climbs of the late 1950s, spinning up the hills at amazing cadences, his legs a blur while his cherubic face hardly showed the strain of his exceptional performances." Pierre Chany called him "without doubt, one of the three or four best climbers of all time." Philippe Brunel of the French newspaper L'Équipe said: "In the furnace of the 1950s, Gaul seemed to ride not against Bahamontes, Anquetil Adriessens, but against oppressive phantoms, to escape his modest origins, riding the ridges to new horizons, far from the life without surprises which would have been his had he stayed in Luxembourg." Gaul was weakest on flat stages and in the heat. In the 1957 Tour de France he went home after two days, stricken by the temperature in what Pierre Chany called "a crematorium Tour." He was at his best in cold and rain, winning the following year's race after a lone ride through the Alps in a day-long downpour described by the French newspaper, L'Équipe as "diluvian." It was the first time the Tour had been won by a pure climber. Gaul moved from 11th to first place. Jacques Goddet wrote in L'Équipe: "This day surpassed anything seen before in terms of pain, suffering and difficulty."

Gaul was a variable rider who could delight and disappoint, almost at random. He was talented in stage races but unremarkable in one-day events. Gaul was taciturn and spoke rarely to anyone but a circle including Anglade, Roger Hassenforder, Nencini and Bahamontes. Writer Philippe Brunel described his reputation within cycling as sulfureuse ("notorious"), while Charlie Woods said: "His eloquence and assurance seemed reserved for the bike, and the bike alone."

Gaul was popular with fans but not among his rivals. Roger St Pierre said: "With his boyish good looks and Jack the Giantkiller style, Charly Gaul was loved by the fans. He had his friends, too – his faithful lieutenant Marcel Ernzer even rode an identical bike so that his master would not be uncomfortable if he had to borrow it after a crash or a puncture. (Note: Gaul was said to have been especially popular with married women in Italy, receiving up to 60 letters some days. The story, possibly apocryphal, is that they were given to Ernzer to read. Some were so frank that Ernzer is said to have sworn never to marry.) But he was not always popular with his rivals, his unpredictable, schoolboyish temperament, his lazy riding on the flat and his sometimes insufferable ego winning him few allies in the bunch." According to writer Jan Heine, many of his problems appeared to have been caused by a hostile peloton, which often seemed to do anything to make Gaul lose. He rarely shared what he won with those who helped him, said René de Latour in Sporting Cyclist. Brian Robinson rode with Gaul in a mixed team in the 1956 Tour de France. He said Gaul had no intention of discussing tactics or of sharing his prizes with the rest of the team in return for their help. When Robinson won £250 on the first day and became the team's best-placed rider, "many of my friends in rival teams congratulated me on my effort [but] the least enthusiastic of all seemed Gaul." Similar events happened in other teams. Gaul rode in 1958 for a team largely of Dutchmen. According to French rider Henry Anglade, who knew Gaul well, came from the same region, and was one of the few French riders close to him, they did nothing to help him in the wind on flat stages. Anglade stated that Gaul "wasn't helped to move up through the echelons", (Note: An echelon, known in French as a bordure or eventail, is a technique groups of riders employ to protect each other from side winds. Rather than ride in a line or a group, they fan out across the road with each rider taking a turn protecting the others before taking up shelter at the other side of the road. Several echelons can form at the same time and it is important to be in one and, preferably, the front one. A light rider like Gaul would be particularly vulnerable in a crosswind.) while Gaul himself said the Dutch were "too interested in their personal classification."

== Retirement ==
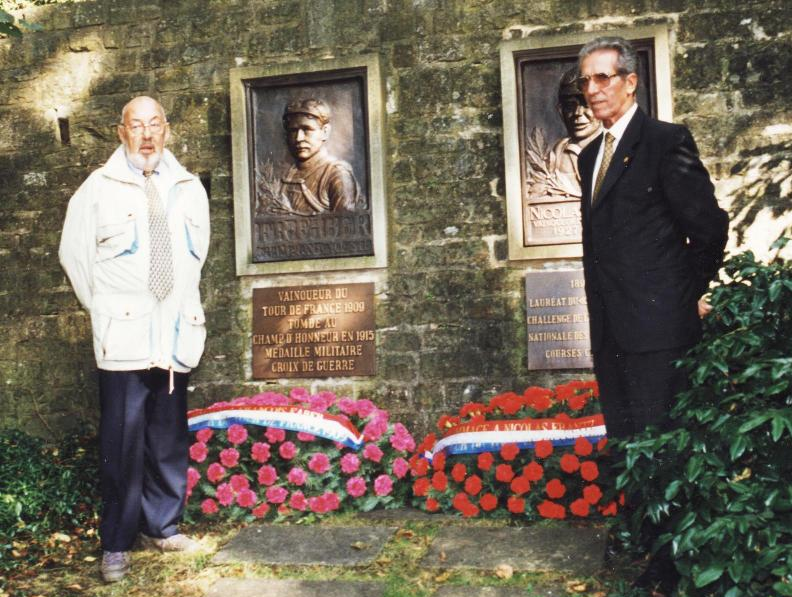
Gaul and Federico Bahamontes in front of the memorial to Luxembourg's other Tour de France winners, François Faber and Nicolas Frantz, in 1998

Gaul moved into a small hut in a forest in the Luxembourg Ardennes. There, he wore the same clothes every day, patterned green trousers, studded walking boots and a sweater or jacket, and went walking with his dog, Pocki. He had a telephone but never answered it. He removed his name from the phone book. His rare excursions were to buy everyday goods and shopkeepers who met him spoke of a man who was ill and depressed, that he hadn't recovered from separating from his second wife. When journalists found him to ask more he confirmed he was distressed but declined, saying: "I'm sorry but it was all so long ago. Please leave me in peace. I'm just an old grumbler." (Note: "Old grumbler" (un vieux grognard), is a popular expression in French meaning more a veteran than someone who complains excessively. It is akin to "Old Contemptible" for British soldiers of the World War I, an insult ("Britain's contemptible army" by Germany) turned back in half-pride. The Grumblers were Napoléon's Old Guard.) He appeared now and then anonymously beside the road during the Tour de France, unrecognisable with a beard, straggling hair and a paunch.

His isolation lasted until 1983, the 25th anniversary of his victory in the Tour de France and the year he met his third wife, Josée. (Note: Gaul married three times, including once in Dover, England, on a special licence. It was one of only two visits to Britain, the other being to ride the track at Herne Hill, London.) He moved with her into a house in the south-west suburbs of Luxembourg city. There he spoke to Pilo Fonck of the radio and television station RTL. Fonck said: "I was as happy as a kid. I had the interview of my life, the one that everybody wanted to have."

== Death ==
Gaul died of a pulmonary embolism two days before his 73rd birthday, following a fall in his house at Itzig. He left a wife, Josée, and daughter, Fabienne. VeloNews said: "Gaul raced in a different era, and his like will never be seen again." A cyclosportive event is held each summer in Luxembourg in Gaul's memory, sometimes attended by his wife and daughter.

== Legacy ==
The Grand Duchy of Luxembourg recognised Gaul's past and his return to society by offering him a job as archivist at the sports ministry. There, according to Philippe Brunel, "he could go back into the past, put together day after day, scrupulously, the puzzle of his life, looking for why this need to escape from society."

The organisers of the Tour de France invited him in 1989 as their guest when the race started in Luxembourg. He made his first public appearance there, with his daughter, Fabienne. He received the Tour de France medal from the organiser, Jean-Marie Leblanc. He attended a reunion of former Tour winners when the centenary race was presented in October 2002. He began following cycling again, particularly Marco Pantani, the leading climber of the time. He was a guest at many races, including stages of the Tour. There he sat beside the rostrum and answered questions put by the commentator, Daniel Mangeas. Writing in The Guardian, William Fotheringham said Gaul "cut a curious figure – plump, shambling, confused – his eyes hidden behind thick spectacles above a wispy beard, a far cry from his heyday in the 1950s."

== Doping ==
Gaul rode in an era before drug tests and drug rules. (Note: Drug testing started in Belgium and then in France in 1965 but there was little serious effort within cycling until the death of Tom Simpson in the 1967 Tour de France. The first tests in the Tour de France, at Bordeaux, led to a strike by riders next morning.) Pictures show that he frequently frothed at the mouth. Goddet spoke of his dribbling during his record ride up Mont Ventoux: "Yes, it was without doubt the first time that I saw the soft and thin face of the Luxembourger, who never shows signs of suffering, running with the sweat of pain, the dribble of effort flooding his shaven chin and sticking to his chest in long dirty ropes."

Gaul rode best in the cold and poorly in the heat. His rival, Bahamontes, did not name Gaul but said that the heat suited him best "because then others couldn't take as much amphetamine." Marcel Ernzer, Gaul's domestique, recalled a conversation with Gaul:

"Charly's going to die."

"Why do you say that?"

"Because Charly takes too many pills."

"But everybody takes them."

"Yes, but Charly a lot more than the others."

== Career achievements ==
=== Major results ===
1950
1st Grand Prix Général Patton
1st Grand Prix Robert Grzonka
3rd Overall Circuit des 12 Cantons

1st Stage 2

3rd Overall Tour de Luxembourg

1st Stage 2b

1951
1st Overall Flèche du Sud
3rd Overall Tour of Austria

1st Stage 1

1952
2nd Overall Tour of Austria

1st Mountains classification

2nd Overall Flèche du Sud
2nd Grand Prix François Faber

1953
1st Overall Flèche du Sud

1st Stage 1a (TTT)

2nd Overall Critérium du Dauphiné Libéré

1st Mountains classification

3rd Overall Tour de Luxembourg
3rd Grand Prix Robert Grzonka
6th Road race, UCI Road World Championships
7th Overall Circuit des 6 Provinces
8th Polymultipliée

1954
1st Overall Circuit des 6 Provinces

1st Stage 3

1st National Cyclo-cross Championship
2nd Overall Tour de Luxembourg

1st Stage 4

3rd Road race, UCI Road World Championships
4th Overall Critérium du Dauphiné Libéré

1st Mountains classification
1st Stage 6

5th Polymultipliée
9th Züri-Metzgete

1955
1st Overall Tour du Sud-Est

1st Stage 7

3rd Overall Tour de France

1st Mountains classification
1st Stages 8 & 17

3rd Overall Tour de Luxembourg
5th Gran Premio di Lugano
6th Overall Tour de Romandie
6th Polymultipliée

1956
1st Overall Giro d'Italia

1st Mountains classification
1st Stages 7, 14 & 19

1st Overall Tour de Luxembourg

1st Stage 2

1st National Road Race Championship
Tour de France

1st Mountains classification
1st Stages 4a & 18

3rd Overall Roma–Napoli–Roma

1st Mountains classification

3rd Mont Faron road race
3rd Mont Faron hill climb
4th Gran Premio di Lugano
6th Grand Prix Genève
7th Giro dell'Emilia

1957
1st Road race, National Road Championships
1st Stage 2b Tour de Luxembourg
4th Overall Giro d'Italia

1st Stages 2 & 19

5th Mont Faron coast race
7th Gran Premio di Lugano

1958
1st Overall Tour de France

1st Stages 8, 18, 21 & 23

1st Grand Prix Forteresse
1st Mont Faron hill climb
3rd Overall Giro d'Italia

1st Stage 14

3rd Overall Challenge Desgrange-Colombo
5th Overall Grand Prix Bali

1st Stage 3

8th Overall Tour du Luxembourg
9th Critérium des As
10th La Flèche Wallonne

1959
1st Overall Giro d'Italia

1st Mountains classification
1st Stages 3, 7 & 21

1st Overall Tour de Luxembourg
1st Road race, National Road Championships
1st Stage 17 Tour de France
1st Stage 7 Roma–Napoli–Roma

1960
1st Road race, National Road Championships
3rd Overall Giro d'Italia

1st Stage 20

10th Overall Tour de Luxembourg

1961
1st Overall Tour de Luxembourg

1st Mountains classification
1st Stage 3

1st Road race, National Road Championships
3rd Overall Tour de France

1st Stage 9

4th Overall Giro d'Italia

1st Stage 20

4th Overall Tour de Romandie
7th Overall Challenge Desgrange-Colombo
9th Coppa Sabatini
10th Circuit des 4 Cantons

1962
1st Road race, National Road Championships
1st National Cyclo-cross Championships
9th Overall Tour de France

1963
8th Züri-Metzgete

=== Grand Tour results timeline ===
	1953	1954	1955	1956	1957	1958	1959	1960	1961	1962	1963
Giro d'Italia	DNE	DNE	DNE	1	4	3	1	3	4	DNF	DNE
Stages won	—	—	—	3	2	1	3	1	1	0	—
Mountains classification	—	—	—	1	2	3	1	5	7	NR	—
Points classification	N/A	N/A	N/A	N/A	N/A	N/A	N/A	N/A	N/A	N/A	N/A
Tour de France	DNF-6	DNF-12	3	13	DNF-2	1	12	DNE	3	9	DNF-16
Stages won	0	0	2	2	0	4	1	—	1	0	0
Mountains classification	NR	NR	1	1	NR	2	2	—	2	4	0
Points classification	NR	NR	NR	NR	NR	24	4	—	11	NR	NR
Vuelta a España	DNE	DNE	DNE	DNE	DNE	DNE	DNE	DNF	DNE	DNE	DNE
Stages won	—	—	—	—	—	—	—	0	—	—	—
Mountains classification	—	—	—	—	—	—	—	NR	—	—	—
Points classification	—	—	—	—	—	—	—	NR	—	—	—

Legend
1	Winner
2–3	Top three-finish
4–10	Top ten-finish
11–	Other finish
DNE	Did not enter
DNF-x	Did not finish (retired on stage x)
DNS-x	Did not start (not started on stage x)
HD-x	Finished outside time limit (occurred on stage x)
DSQ	Disqualified
N/A	Race/classification not held
NR	Not ranked in this classification

== Bibliography ==
- Roland Barthes: Le Tour de France comme épopée. In Mythologies. Paris: Éditions du Seuil, 1957, pp. 110–121.
- Bergauf, bergab mit Charly Gaul. Luxembourg: Editioun François Mersch, 1959.
- Christian Laborde: L'ange qui aimait la pluie. Paris: Éditions Albin Michel, 1994. ISBN 2-226-06977-1.
- Gast Zangerlé: La saga Charly Gaul. Luxembourg: Éditions Saint-Paul, 2006. ISBN 2-87963-597-7. Also in German as Der Mythos Charly Gaul (The Myth of Charly Gaul).
- Paul Maunder: Angel of the Mountains. UK: Quercus Publishing, 2024. ISBN 1529429587
