= 1956 Paris–Roubaix =

Cycling race

Race details
- Dates: 8 April 1956
- Stages: 1
- Distance: 252 km (156.6 mi)
- Winning time: 6h 01' 26"

Results
| | Winner | Louison Bobet (FRA) |
| | Second | Alfred De Bruyne (BEL) |
| | Third | Jean Forestier (FRA) |

The 1956 Paris–Roubaix was the 54th edition of the Paris–Roubaix, a classic one-day cycle race in France. The single day event was held on 8 April 1956 and stretched 252 km (157 mi) from Paris to the finish at Roubaix Velodrome. The winner was Louison Bobet from France.

== Results ==
Final results (1–10)
| Rank | Cyclist | Time |
|---|---|---|
| 1 | Louison Bobet (FRA) | 6h 01' 26″ |
| 2 | Alfred De Bruyne (BEL) | +0' 00″ |
| 3 | Jean Forestier (FRA) | +0' 00″ |
| 4 | Rik Van Steenbergen (BEL) | +0' 00″ |
| 5 | Bernard Gauthier (FRA) | +0' 00″ |
| 6 | Nello Lauredi (FRA) | +0' 00″ |
| 7 | Germain Derijcke (BEL) | +0' 53″ |
| 8 | André Vlaeyen (BEL) | +0' 53″ |
| 9 | Jean Robic (FRA) | +0' 53″ |
| 10 | Gilbert Bauvin (FRA) | +0' 53″ |
