= 1952 Giro di Lombardia =

Race details
- Dates: 26 October 1952
- Stages: 1
- Distance: 226 km (140.4 mi)

Results
	Winner	Giuseppe Minardi (ITA)
	Second	Nino Defilippis (ITA)
	Third	Arrigo Padovan (ITA)

The 1952 Giro di Lombardia, 46th edition of the race, was held on 26 October 1952.

== General classification ==
=== Final general classification ===
Rank	Rider	Team	Time
1	Giuseppe Minardi (ITA)	Legnano	
2	Nino Defilippis (ITA)	Legnano	
3	Arrigo Padovan (ITA)	Atala	
4	Danilo Barozzi (ITA)	Atala	
5	Adolfo Grosso (ITA)	Benotto-Fiorelli-Salus	
6	Waldemaro Bartolozzi (ITA)	Atala	
7	Giorgio Albani (ITA)	Legnano	
8	Agostino Coletto (ITA)	Frejus	
9	Louison Bobet (FRA)	Stella-Huret-Dunlop	
10	Ferdi Kübler (SUI)	Tebag	
