= 1948 Paris–Brussels =

Cycling race

Race details
- Dates: 11 April
- Stages: 1
- Distance: 325 km (201.9 mi)
- Winning time: 10h

Results
	Winner	Lode Poels (BEL)
	Second	Albert Sercu (BEL)
	Third	Jean Bogaerts (BEL)

The 1948 Paris–Brussels was the 34th edition of the Paris–Brussels, a classic one-day cycle race in France and Belgium. The single day event was held on 11 April 1948 and stretched 325 km (202 mi) from Paris to the finish in Brussels.

== Results ==
Final results (1–7)
Rank	Cyclist	Time
1	Lode Poels (BEL)	10h
2	Albert Sercu (BEL)	+0' 00″
3	Jean Bogaerts (BEL)	+0' 00″
4	Raoul Rémy (FRA)	+0' 45″
5	Marcel Ryckaert (BEL)	+0' 45″
6	Alphonse De Vreese (FRA)	+0' 45″
7	Maurice Desimpelaere (BEL)	+0' 45″
