= 1951 Giro di Lombardia =

Race details
- Dates: 1951
- Stages: 1
- Distance: 226 km (140.4 mi)

Results
	Winner	Louison Bobet (FRA)
	Second	Giuseppe Minardi (ITA)
	Third	Fausto Coppi (ITA)

The 1951 Giro di Lombardia, 45th edition of the race, was held in 1951.

== General classification ==
=== Final general classification ===
Rank	Rider	Team	Time
1	Louison Bobet (FRA)	Bottecchia–Ursus	
2	Giuseppe Minardi (ITA)	Legnano	
3	Fausto Coppi (ITA)	Bianchi-Pirelli	
4	Renzo Soldani (ITA)	Legnano	
5	Pasquale Fornara (ITA)	Legnano	
6	Angelo Conterno (ITA)	Taurea	
7	Giancarlo Astrua (ITA)	Atala	
8	Primo Volpi (ITA)	Bartali	
9	Giorgio Albani (ITA)	Legnano	
10	Arrigo Padovan (ITA)	Lygie	
