= 1952 Milan–San Remo =

Race details
- Dates: 19 March 1952
- Stages: 1
- Distance: 282 km (175 mi)
- Winning time: 7h 22' 07"

Results
| | Winner | Loretto Petrucci (ITA) |
| | Second | Giuseppe Minardi (ITA) |
| | Third | Serge Blusson (FRA) |

The 1952 Milan–San Remo was the 43rd edition of the Milan–San Remo cycle race and was held on 19 March 1952. The race started in Milan and finished in San Remo. The race was won by Loretto Petrucci.

== General classification ==
Final general classification

| Rank | Rider | Time |
|---|---|---|
| 1 | Loretto Petrucci (ITA) | 7h 22' 07" |
| 2 | Giuseppe Minardi (ITA) | + 0" |
| 3 | Serge Blusson (FRA) | + 0" |
| 4 | Raphaël Géminiani (FRA) | + 0" |
| 5 | Rodolfo Falzoni (ITA) | + 0" |
| 6 | Vittorio Seghezzi (ITA) | + 0" |
| 7 | Fritz Schär (SUI) | + 0" |
| 8 | Jean Robic (FRA) | + 0" |
| 9 | Giovanni Pettinati (ITA) | + 0" |
| 10 | Rinaldo Moresco (ITA) | + 0" |
