= Loretto Petrucci =

Italian cyclist

Personal information
- Full name: Loretto Petrucci
- Born: 18 August 1929 Capostrada, Italy
- Died: 17 June 2016 (aged 86)

Cycling career
- Sport: Cycling
- Discipline: Road
- Role: Rider

Major wins
- Challenge Desgrange-Colombo (1953); Milan–San Remo (1952, 1953)

Loretto Petrucci (18 August 1929 – 17 June 2016) was an Italian professional road bicycle racer who won Milan–San Remo in 1952 and 1953.

== Palmarès ==
1950
3rd, Coppa Bernocchi
3rd, Giro del Piemonte

1951
1st, Giro di Toscana
1st, GP Massaua-Fossati
3rd, Milan–San Remo
3rd, Trofeo Baracchi

1952
1st, Milan–San Remo
2nd, Tour of Flanders
2nd, Trofeo Baracchi

1953
1st, Overall, Challenge Desgrange-Colombo
2nd, Giro del Piemonte
1st, Milan–San Remo
3rd, National Championship, Road, Elite, Italy
2nd, Milano–Torino
2nd, Giro di Campania
1st, Paris–Brussels
3rd, La Flèche Wallonne

1955
1st, Giro del Lazio
