= August 1953 =

Month of 1953

<<	August 1953					>>
Su	Mo	Tu	We	Th	Fr	Sa
						1
2	3	4	5	6	7	8
9	10	11	12	13	14	15
16	17	18	19	20	21	22
23	24	25	26	27	28	29
30	31

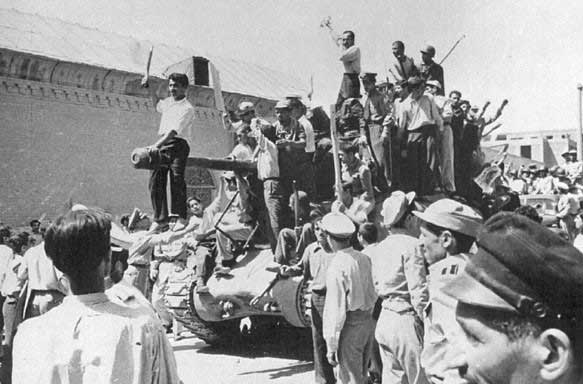
August 19: a coup d'etat takes place in Iran that resulted in the Overthrow of Prime Minister Mohammad Mosaddegh

The following events occurred in August 1953:

== August 1, 1953 (Saturday) ==
- The 1953–54 DFB-Pokal football tournament opened in West Germany.
- Indian Airlines, based in Delhi, began operations, having been set up under the Air Corporations Act, 1953, by a merger of several domestic airlines.

== August 2, 1953 (Sunday) ==
- Born: Anthony Seldon, English historian and biographer, in Stepney

== August 3, 1953 (Monday) ==
- Born: Marlene Dumas, South African painter, in Cape Town

== August 4, 1953 (Tuesday) ==
- Born: Hiroyuki Usui, Japanese footballer and manager

== August 5, 1953 (Wednesday) ==
- Operation Big Switch began: The United Nations Command (UNC) repatriated over 75,823 prisoners of war (70,183 North Koreans and 5,640 Chinese), whilst the PVA/KPA repatriated 12,773 UNC POWs.
- The US Navy vessel Staten Island, in the southern Davis Strait, near Baffin Island, launched the first of six 1953 NRL flights, three of which reached altitude and returned data.
- Fred Zinnemann's war film From Here to Eternity, starring Burt Lancaster, Montgomery Clift, Deborah Kerr, Frank Sinatra, and Donna Reed, premièred despite the disapproval of both the US Army and the US Navy.
- Born: András Ligeti, Hungarian violinist and conductor, in Pécs (died 2021)

== August 6, 1953 (Thursday) ==
- Died: Houseley Stevenson, 74, British-born American actor

== August 7, 1953 (Friday) ==
- The 1953 Irish Greyhound Derby was won by Spanish Battleship, trained by Tom Lynch and owned by Tim 'Chubb' O'Connor.

== August 8, 1953 (Saturday) ==
- In an address to the Supreme Soviet, Soviet prime minister Georgy Malenkov claimed that the Soviet Union had developed a hydrogen bomb.
- 37 people were injured when a northbound Royal Scot train was derailed near Abington, Scotland, UK, on its way down from Beattock Summit; the track had buckled as a result of unusually high temperatures.
- In the Western Australian National Football League, Bernie Naylor kicked a WANFL record 23 goals against Subiaco, including twelve in one quarter.
- Born: Nigel Mansell, English racing driver, in Upton-upon-Severn

== August 9, 1953 (Sunday) ==
- The British ferry St Columba ran aground in Ettrick Bay, Kyles of Bute, Buteshire, but was refloated later in the day.

== August 10, 1953 (Monday) ==
- The Canadian federal election resulted in victory for the Liberal Party of Canada and prime minister Louis St. Laurent.
- Pete Schoening saved the lives of several members of the American K2 expedition, one of the most famous events in mountaineering history.
- The 1953 Pan Arab Games concluded in Alexandria, Egypt. The home country finished top of the medal table.

== August 11, 1953 (Tuesday) ==
- Hurricane Barbara formed in the southern Bahamas.
- A US-registered scow, the 28-ton Sacco No. 3, was stranded 2.5 nautical miles (4.6 km) southeast of Ocean Cape in the Territory of Alaska and lost.
- Born: Hulk Hogan, American professional wrestler and actor, in Augusta, Georgia (d. 2025)

== August 12, 1953 (Wednesday) ==
- 1953 Ceylonese Hartal: A country-wide demonstration of civil disobedience and strikes, in protest against government policy, was organised by the Lanka Sama Samaja Party in Ceylon (now Sri Lanka). It was the first such protest in the country since independence.
- A magnitude 7.2 earthquake devastated most of the Ionian Sea islands in Greece's worst natural disaster in centuries.
- Soviet atomic bomb project: "Joe 4" – The first Soviet thermonuclear weapon was detonated at Semipalatinsk Test Site, Kazakh SSR.

== August 13, 1953 (Thursday) ==
- Four million workers went on strike in France to protest against austerity measures.

== August 14, 1953 (Friday) ==
- Born: James Horner, American film composer, in Los Angeles (died 2015, plane crash)

== August 15, 1953 (Saturday) ==
- According to a Japanese government official confirmed report, a torrential rain, followed by a dam burst, levee collapse and landslides affected Wazuka, Minamiyamashiro, Kyoto Prefecture, Japan; a total of 430 persons were killed.
- Ten people died in the Irk Valley Junction rail crash at Collyhurst near Manchester, UK.
- The 1953 Summer Deaflympics opened in Brussels, Belgium, lasting for four days.

== August 16, 1953 (Sunday) ==
- Following a referendum, Mohammad Mosaddegh officially announced the dissolution of Iran's parliament.

== August 17, 1953 (Monday) ==
- The first planning session of Narcotics Anonymous was held in Southern California, United States (see October 5).
- A gas screw vessel, the Dickie Ray, was stranded off Carmanah Lighthouse, Vancouver Island, BC, Canada, and lost.
- Born: Herta Müller, German novelist, poet, essayist and Nobel laureate, in Nițchidorf, Romania

== August 18, 1953 (Tuesday) ==
- The second of the controversial Kinsey Reports, Sexual Behavior in the Human Female, was published in the US.

== August 19, 1953 (Wednesday) ==
- 1953 Iranian coup d'état: The United States Central Intelligence Agency and the UK were involved in overthrowing the government of Mohammad Mosaddegh in Iran, so as to retain power for Shah Mohammad Reza Pahlavi.

== August 20, 1953 (Thursday) ==
- King Mohammed V of Morocco was deposed by the French government and exiled to Corsica. He was replaced by a puppet monarch, his relation Mohammed Ben Aarafa.
- The United States returned to West Germany 382 ships it had captured during World War II.
- Seventeen U.S. Air Force F-84G Thunderjets made the longest-ever nonstop flight by jet fighters, travelling from the United States to the United Kingdom by means of aerial refueling.
- The United States Army test-fired the first Redstone missile at Cape Canaveral, Florida. The Redstone, on which research and development had begun in 1950, was later used as a launch vehicle in the crewed suborbital flights and in other development flights in Project Mercury.

== August 21, 1953 (Friday) ==
- The US minesweeper USS Fidelity (AM-443) was launched in New Orleans, Louisiana.

== August 22, 1953 (Saturday) ==
- Devil's Island, the penal colony in the Salvation Islands of French Guiana, was closed down, a year after its last use.

== August 23, 1953 (Sunday) ==
- The 1953 Swiss Grand Prix was held at Bremgarten Circuit in Bern and was won by Italian driver Alberto Ascari.

== August 24, 1953 (Monday) ==
- Born: Sam Torrance, Scottish golfer, in Largs

== August 25, 1953 (Tuesday) ==
- The general strike ended in France.

== August 26, 1953 (Wednesday) ==
- Born: David Hurley, Governor-General of Australia, in Wollongong
- Died: José Hipólito Raposo, 68, Portuguese politician, writer, lawyer and historian

== August 27, 1953 (Thursday) ==
- Voting concluded in the 1953 Mauritian general election, resulting in victory for the Labour Party, which won 13 of the 19 seats on the Legislative Council.
- Roman Holiday, starring Gregory Peck and Audrey Hepburn, directed by William Wyler, received its première and made a star of Hepburn.
- Born: Peter Stormare, Swedish actor, in Kumla

== August 28, 1953 (Friday) ==
- Nippon TV, Japan's first commercial television channel, was launched.
- In Williamsport, Pennsylvania, United States, the 1953 Little League World Series baseball championship for juniors was won by the team from Birmingham, Alabama.
- Ireland's Department of Agriculture, Food and the Marine issued the Fisheries (Delegation of Ministerial Functions) Order 1953.
- In the Gaza Strip, Ariel Sharon led an assault on the Bureij refugee camps that led to the deaths of 20 - 30 Palestinians.

== August 29, 1953 (Saturday) ==
- The Corangamite by-election for the Australian House of Representatives, brought about by the death of Liberal MP Allan McDonald, was a victory for Liberal candidate Dan Mackinnon.
- The Lang by-election for the Australian House of Representatives, brought about by the death of Labor MP Dan Mulcahy, was a victory for the Labor candidate Frank Stewart.

== August 30, 1953 (Sunday) ==
- The 1000 km of Nürburgring motor race took place in West Germany. Alberto Ascari and his co-driver Giuseppe Farina were victorious.
- Died:
  - Gaetano Merola, Italian conductor (b. 1881)
  - Maurice Nicoll, British psychiatrist (b. 1884)

== August 31, 1953 (Monday) ==
- Serge Blusson of France won the 1953 GP Ouest–France cycle race.
- The Soviet cargo ship MV Akademik Karpinsky foundered near Władysławowo, Poland, on a voyage between Kaliningrad and Amsterdam.
