= June 1953 =

Month of 1953

<<	June 1953					>>
Su	Mo	Tu	We	Th	Fr	Sa
	1	2	3	4	5	6
7	8	9	10	11	12	13
14	15	16	17	18	19	20
21	22	23	24	25	26	27
28	29	30

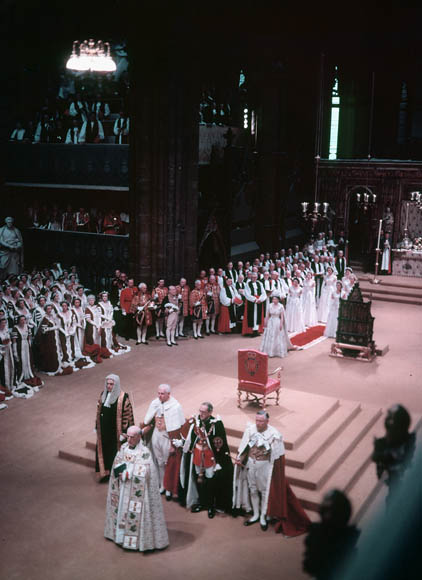
June 2, 1953: Coronation of Elizabeth II

The following events occurred in June 1953:

== June 1, 1953 (Monday) ==
- The first Bergen International Festival opened in Norway, exactly 55 years after the first music festival in Norway, Edvard Grieg's "Bergen Music Festival".
- Born: David Berkowitz, American serial killer
- Died: Alex James, 51, Scottish football, from cancer

== June 2, 1953 (Tuesday) ==
- Plzeň uprising: Three days of riots in Czechoslovakia, over government currency reforms, came to an end.
- The coronation of Queen Elizabeth II as Queen of the United Kingdom, Canada, Australia, New Zealand, South Africa, Pakistan, and Ceylon, took place at Westminster Abbey. At the Queen's own insistence, the ceremony was televised. In the Coronation Honours, recipients of honours included politician Lord Woolton (created a viscount), actor John Gielgud, cricketer Jack Hobbs, jockey Gordon Richards and Rhodesian Prime Minister Roy Welensky (knighted) and Violet Bonham Carter (made a Dame).
- Fausto Coppi won the Giro d'Italia cycle race.
- In the United States, a special election was held in South Carolina's 4th congressional district for a new representative to replace the late Joseph R. Bryson. Democrat Robert T. Ashmore was elected.

== June 3, 1953 (Wednesday) ==
- The first Canada Cup golf competition, held at Montreal, Quebec, was won by the team from Argentina, comprising Antonio Cerdá and Roberto De Vicenzo.
- Died: Florence Price, 66, African-American classical composer, pianist, organist and music teacher, of a stroke

== June 4, 1953 (Thursday) ==
- The Italian cargo ship Serapide sank off Cape Palos, Spain. Its 24 crew members were rescued by the Spanish naval destroyer Legazpi.

== June 5, 1953 (Friday) ==
- A new constitution took effect in Denmark, following the previous month's referendum (see May 1953).
- Died:
  - Bill Tilden, 60, American tennis champion, of heart problems
  - Roland Young, 65, English actor, best known for his role as "Cosmo Topper"

== June 6, 1953 (Saturday) ==
- Born: June Yamagishi, Japanese guitarist, in Ise, Mie

== June 7, 1953 (Sunday) ==
- In the Italian general election, the Christian Democracy party won a plurality in both legislative houses. Alcide De Gasperi continued as prime minister.
- The US tanker ship Phoenix collided with the Pan Massachusetts in the Delaware River near Delaware City, Delaware. The Phoenix sank, while both ships caught fire and were lost.

== June 8, 1953 (Monday) ==
- Austria and the Soviet Union formed diplomatic relations.

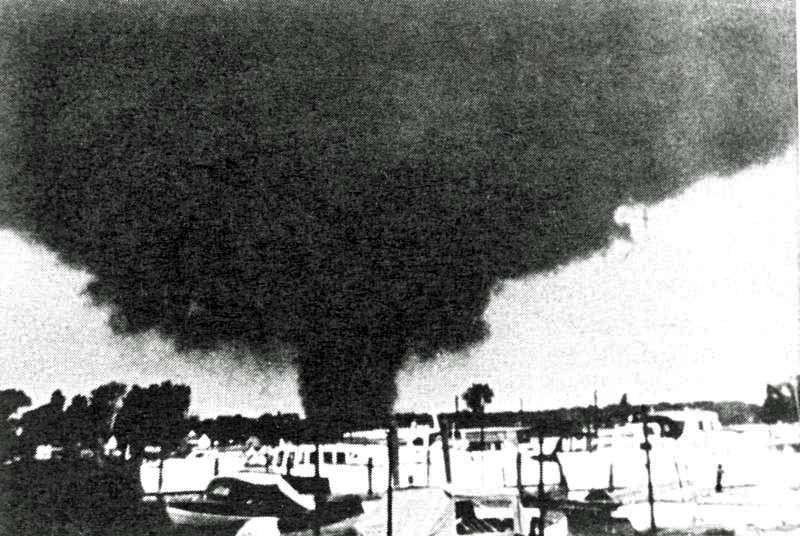
June 8, 1953: Tornado near Erie, Michigan

- Flint–Worcester tornado outbreak sequence: A tornado killed 115 people in Flint, Michigan (the last in the United States to claim more than 100 lives until the 2011 Joplin tornado).
- The US radio drama serial Family Skeleton was broadcast for the first time, on CBS.
- Born: Ivo Sanader, the "Ćaća", Prime minister of Croatia, in Dugobabe, near Split

== June 9, 1953 (Tuesday) ==
- A general election was held in the Canadian province of British Columbia. The minority government formed in the previous year by W. A. C. Bennett and the Social Credit Party obtained an overall majority.
- In the United States, CIA Technical Services Staff head Sidney Gottlieb approved the use of LSD in an MKUltra subproject.
- Flint–Worcester tornado outbreak sequence: A tornado spawned from the same storm system as the Flint tornado hit Worcester, Massachusetts, United States, killing 94.
- A boiler explosion occurred on the Chesapeake and Ohio Railway's 2-6-6-6 engine, "Allegheny", number 1642. Three crew members were killed by the blast, which was blamed on a faulty component.

== June 10, 1953 (Wednesday) ==
- Deputy British Prime Minister Anthony Eden underwent a biliary tract operation, carried out by Dr. Richard Cattell at the New England Baptist Hospital in Boston, Massachusetts, United States.

== June 11, 1953 (Thursday) ==
- Born: José Bové, French farmer and politician, in Talence

== June 13, 1953 (Saturday) ==
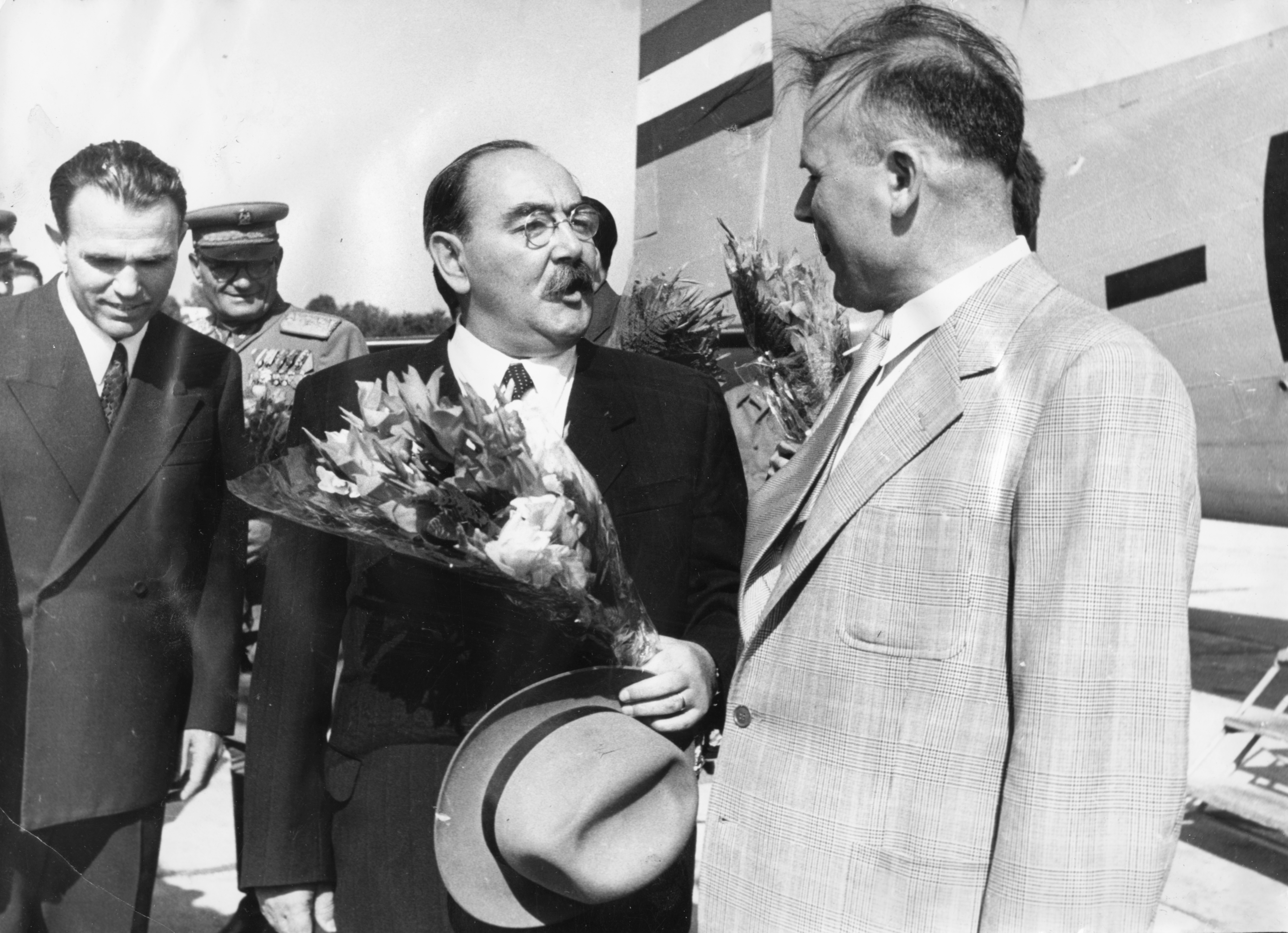
Imre Nagy (center) in June 1953

- Hungarian Prime Minister Mátyás Rákosi was replaced by Imre Nagy.
- A bloodless coup d'état took place in Colombia, and General Gustavo Rojas Pinilla took over the government.
- Ben Hogan won the 53rd US Open golf tournament.
- Born: Tim Allen, American actor and comedian, in Denver, Colorado

== June 14, 1953 (Sunday) ==
- The Czechoslovak presidential election, brought about by the death of Klement Gottwald (see March 1953), was won by the country's prime minister, Antonín Zápotocký.
- A general election was held in Liechtenstein. The Progressive Citizens' Party won a small majority and continued to govern in coalition with the Patriotic Union.
- Tony Rolt and Duncan Hamilton won the 24 Hours of Le Mans motor race.
- Lightning struck Aeroflot Flight 229, an Ilyushin Il-12, during a domestic flight in the Soviet Union. The aircraft entered an uncontrolled dive and lost its outer wing panels when the crew attempted to recover. The aircraft crashed into a wooded hillside northeast of Zugdidi in the Georgian Soviet Socialist Republic and caught fire, killing all 18 people on board.
- Died: Nato Vachnadze, 49, Georgian film actress, killed in the crash of Aeroflot Flight 229

== June 15, 1953 (Monday) ==
- The New York City Transit Authority was created.
- Born: Xi Jinping, General Secretary of the Chinese Communist Party since 2012, in Beijing
- Died: Henry Scattergood, American cricketer (b. 1877)

== June 16, 1953 (Tuesday) ==
- East German uprising of 1953: Strike action by construction workers began in East Berlin, leading to a wider uprising against the government.
- Norwegian cruise ship Brand V ran aground at Ålesund and was a total loss. All passengers and crew were rescued.

== June 17, 1953 (Wednesday) ==
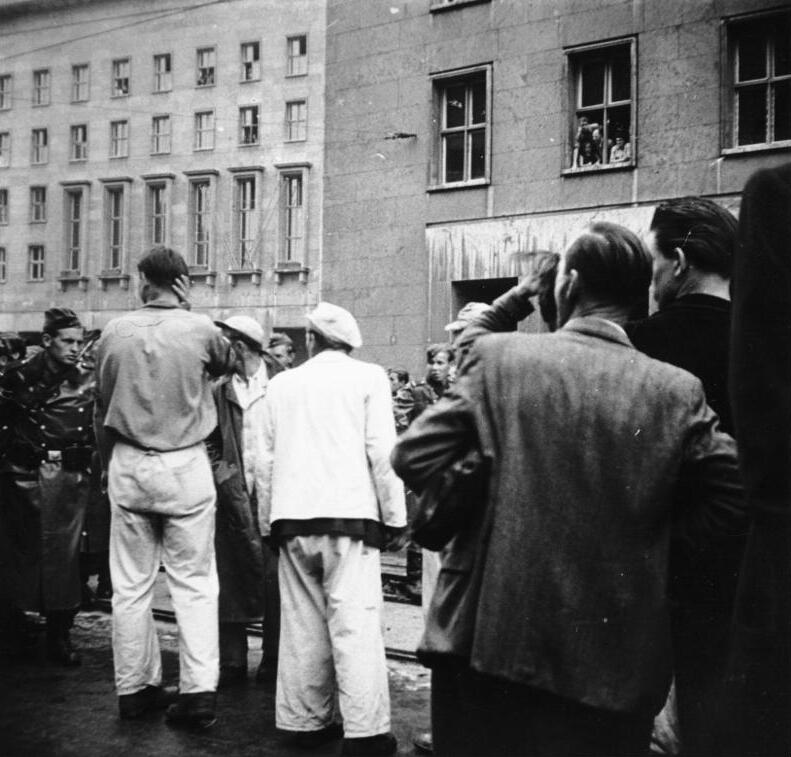
June 17, 1953: Demonstration by construction workers in East Berlin

- The uprising of 1953 in East Germany was brutally suppressed; June 17 was celebrated in West Germany as German Unity Day until after German reunification occurred.
- Bertolt Brecht continued with rehearsals for the first production of Erwin Strittmatter's Katzgraben: Szenen aus dem Bauernleben with the Berliner Ensemble, inspiring a disapproving Günter Grass's Die Plebejer proben den Aufstand (1966).

== June 18, 1953 (Thursday) ==
- Egypt declared itself a republic, after last year's revolution.
- Tachikawa air disaster: A United States Air Force Douglas C-124 Globemaster II crashed just after takeoff from Tachikawa Airfield near Tokyo, Japan, killing all 129 people on board in the worst air crash in history at this time and the first with a confirmed death toll exceeding 100.
- The 3rd Berlin International Film Festival opened in West Germany.
- Died: René Fonck, 59, French aviator, top Allied World War I flying ace (stroke)

== June 19, 1953 (Friday) ==
- The Baton Rouge bus boycott, often regarded as the start of the civil rights movement, began in the United States.
- In Pakistan, the Punjab Disturbances Court of Inquiry was appointed, under Muhammad Munir and Malik Rustam Kayani, to investigate the Lahore riots (see March 1953).
- The 32nd annual NCAA Track and Field Championships opened in Lincoln, Nebraska, lasting for two days.
- Died:
  - Harold Cazneaux, Australian photographer (b. 1878)
  - Julius Rosenberg, 35, and Ethel Rosenberg, 37, American communist spies (executed)
  - Norman Ross, 57, American Olympic swimmer and radio personality sometimes known as "The Big Moose" and "Uncle Normie"

== June 20, 1953 (Saturday) ==
- An unsuccessful American Karakoram expedition, led by Charles Snead Houston, arrived at the base of K2.
- Born: Ulrich Mühe, German actor (d. 2007)

== June 21, 1953 (Sunday) ==
- In the final of the first Spanish football cup competition, held in Madrid, CF Barcelona defeated Club Atlético de Bilbao.
- Born: Benazir Bhutto, Prime Minister of Pakistan, in Karachi, daughter of Zulfikar Ali Bhutto and Begum Nusrat Ispahani (assassinated 2007)

== June 22, 1953 (Monday) ==
- The Government of Nepal hosted a reception for members of the Mount Everest expedition, at which Tenzing Norgay was presented with a prize of ten thousand rupees, while Edmund Hillary and John Hunt were given jewelled kukri and others jewelled caskets. The Government of India announced the creation of a new Gold Medal for civilian gallantry, of which Hunt, Hillary and Tenzing were to be the first recipients.
- Born: Cyndi Lauper, American singer, songwriter, and actress, in New York City

== June 23, 1953 (Tuesday) ==
- The first round-trip across the continental United States to be carried out between sunrise and sunset was completed by Lieutenant Commander George H. Whisler, Jr., of U.S. Navy Air Transport Squadron 31 (VR-31), departing Naval Air Station Norfolk, Virginia, in a Grumman F9F-6 Cougar, and finally arriving at Naval Air Station North Island, California. He then took off from North Island in a Douglas F3D-2 Skyknight, and finally landed at Naval Air Station Norfolk at 19:21 local time.
- Died: Albert Gleizes, 71, French artist, theoretician and philosopher

== June 24, 1953 (Wednesday) ==
- New US television station KOBR began broadcasting from Roswell, New Mexico.
- Born: Fátima Langa, Mozambican writer, in Bahanine (died 2017)

== June 25, 1953 (Thursday) ==
- The 1953 Northern Kyushu flood began, lasting until June 29 and eventually causing 771 deaths and affecting about 1 million people.

== June 26, 1953 (Friday) ==
- Lavrentiy Beria, Soviet internal affairs minister and former NKVD leader, was arrested, accused of espionage.
- Indian director Vedantam Raghavayya's film Devadasu, with Akkineni Nageswara Rao in the title role, was released in a Telugu version.
- The 10-gross register ton, US motor vessel Mary Pat was destroyed by fire in Bristol Bay off the coast of the Territory of Alaska, United States.

== June 27, 1953 (Saturday) ==
- The final of the 1953 English Greyhound Derby was held at White City Stadium, London, and was won by Daws Dancer.

== June 28, 1953 (Sunday) ==
- The U.S. Women's Open golf tournament was won by Betsy Rawls, after a play-off against Jackie Pung.
- The final match of the 1953 Taça de Portugal football tournament was played at the Estádio Nacional in Oeiras Municipality, Portugal. Benfica emerged winners for the seventh time, defeating Porto 5–0.
- Giuseppe Farina of Italy won the III Grand Prix de Rouen-les-Essarts, a combined Formula One and Formula Two motor race.

== June 29, 1953 (Monday) ==
- J. Brooke Mosley was elected Coadjutor Bishop of Delaware in the Episcopal Church, at a special convention in Wilmington, Delaware, United States.
- Ahmet Ertegun of Atlantic Records brought together the first line-up of the US singing group that later became The Drifters. After a recording session in New York City, he asked lead singer Clyde McPhatter to put together a different backing group.

== June 30, 1953 (Tuesday) ==
- The first Chevrolet Corvette was built, at Flint, Michigan, United States.
- The first roll-on/roll-off ferry crossing of the English Channel took place, from Dover to Boulogne.
- The final of the 1953 Copa del Generalísimo football competition took place in Madrid, Spain, and was won by Real Madrid FC.
- Airey Neave, the first British prisoner-of-war to escape from Colditz Castle during World War II, was elected as a Conservative MP at the Abingdon by-election, brought about by the elevation to the peerage of his predecessor, Ralph Glyn.
- Died: Elsa Beskow, 79, Swedish author and illustrator of children's books
