= January 1953 =

Month of 1953

<<	January 1953					>>
Su	Mo	Tu	We	Th	Fr	Sa
				1	2	3
4	5	6	7	8	9	10
11	12	13	14	15	16	17
18	19	20	21	22	23	24
25	26	27	28	29	30	31

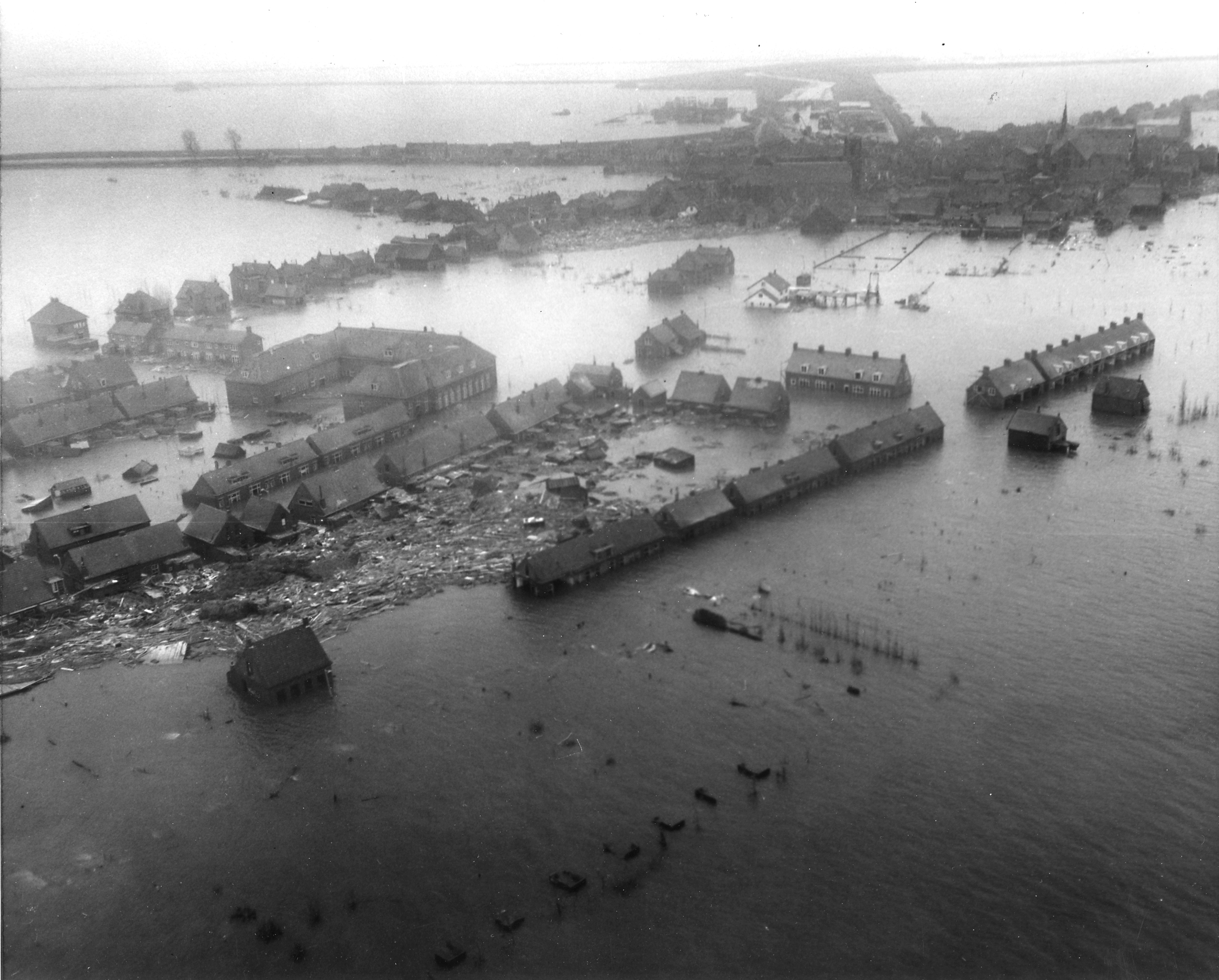
January 31, 1953: Flooding begins in the North Sea, eventually causing 2,000 deaths in the Netherlands and the UK.

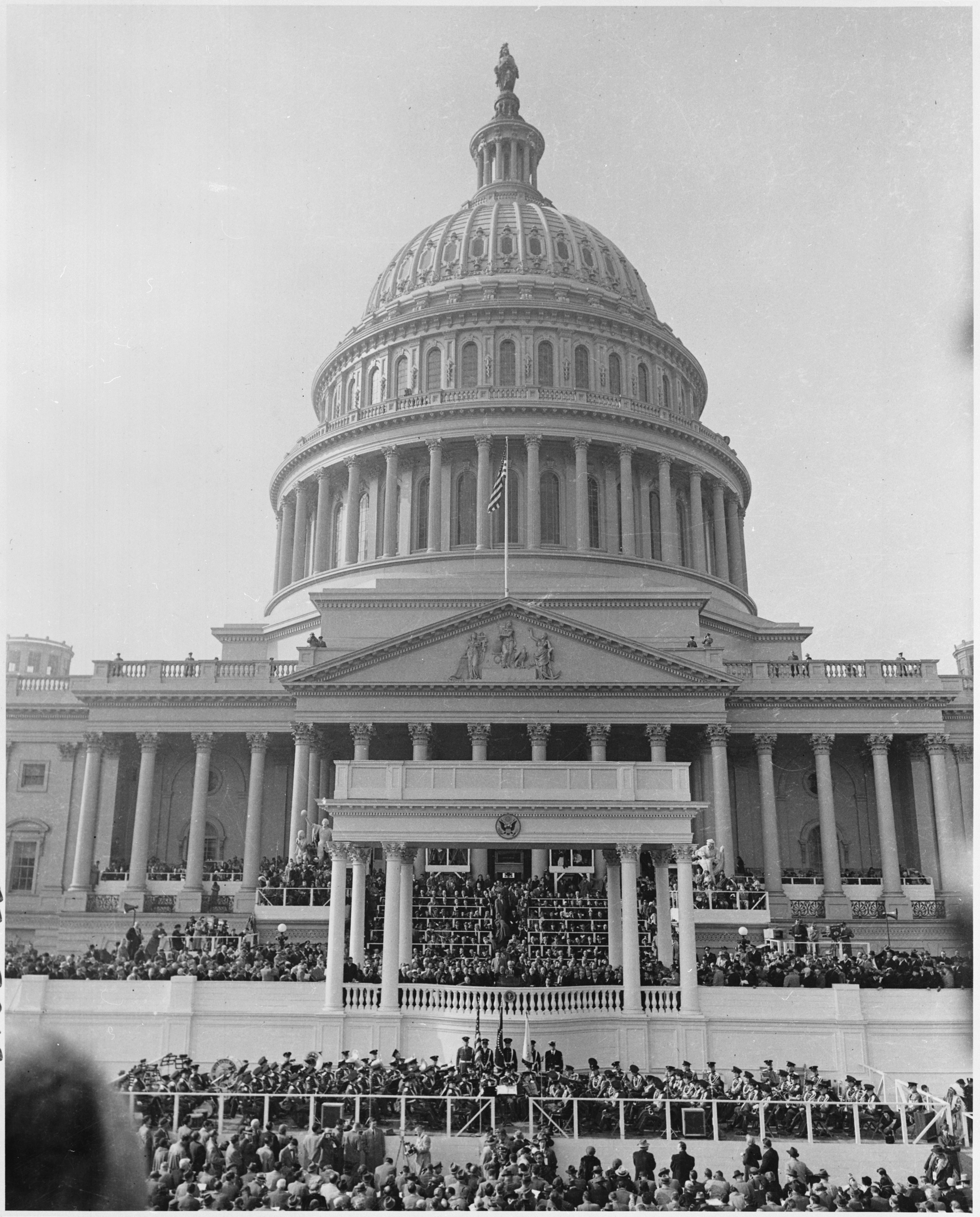
January 20, 1953: Dwight D. Eisenhower is inaugurated as the new President of the United States.

The following events occurred in January 1953:

== January 1, 1953 (Thursday) ==
- The National Library of Canada was established in Ottawa.
- The United States Army officially gave up its glider capability.
- Died: Hank Williams, 29, American musician. Williams' death was attributed to multiple causes, including a heart condition, drugs and injuries from a recent beating.

== January 2, 1953 (Friday) ==
- Died: Guccio Gucci, 71, Italian designer and businessman

== January 3, 1953 (Saturday) ==
- American politician Oliver P. Bolton began his first term in the US Congress, where his mother, Frances P. Bolton, was already serving. They thus became the first mother and son to serve simultaneously in Congress.

== January 4, 1953 (Sunday) ==
- KTSM TV channel 9 in El Paso, TX (NBC) begins broadcasting.
- Died: Yasuhito, Prince Chichibu, Japanese prince (b. 1902)

== January 5, 1953 (Monday) ==
- A British European Airways Vickers VC.1 Type 610 Viking 1B Lord St. Vincent hit an approach light and crashed into a building at Nutts Corner Airport near Belfast in Northern Ireland, killing 27 of the 35 people on board.
- Samuel Beckett's play Waiting for Godot had its first public stage première (in French as En attendant Godot) at the Théâtre de Babylone in Paris.

== January 6, 1953 (Tuesday) ==
- The Asian Socialist Conference opened in Rangoon, Burma.
- In New Zealand, Godfrey Bowen set a world sheep shearing record by shearing 456 sheep in nine hours.
- In the UK, the Broadcasting Council for Wales met for the first time.
- Born: Malcolm Young, Australian rock musician, guitarist for AC/DC (d. 2017)

== January 7, 1953 (Wednesday) ==
- U.S. President Harry S. Truman announced the United States had developed a hydrogen bomb. Truman's announcement came in his State of the Union Report, sent in the form of a letter rather than being made in a public speech. Truman told Congress, "recently, in the thermonuclear tests at Eniwetok, we have entered another stage in the world-shaking development of atomic energy. From now on, man moves into a new era of destructive power, capable of creating explosions of a new order of magnitude, dwarfing the mushroom clouds of Hiroshima and Nagasaki... We are being hurried forward, in our mastery of the atom, from one discovery to another, toward yet unforeseeable peaks of destructive power." He added, "The war of the future would be one in which man could extinguish millions of lives at one blow, demolish the great cities of the world, wipe out the cultural achievements of the past— and destroy the very structure of a civilization that has been slowly and painfully built up through hundreds of generations.
- Jess McMahon and Toots Mondt founded Capitol Wrestling Corporation, the professional wrestling promotion that would later evolve into the modern-day WWE.
- Died: Osa Johnson, American adventurer and documentary filmmaker (b. 1894)

Born: Leslie Mándoki, Dschinghis Khan member since 1979, in Munich, Germany

== January 8, 1953 (Thursday) ==
- Radical politician René Mayer formed a government and began a period of less than six months as Prime Minister of France.

== January 9, 1953 (Friday) ==
- Chang Cheong-ho, a South Korean passenger ship, capsized in strong wind near the Port of Busan, according to local coast guard officials. 229 persons were confirmed killed.
- Died: Marguerite Pitre (aka Madame le Corbeau), 44, Canadian murderer, the last woman to be hanged in Canada

== January 10, 1953 (Saturday) ==
- Born:
  - Pat Benatar, American singer-songwriter, in Brooklyn, New York
  - Karl Bohnak, American politician and member of the Michigan House of Representatives since 2025

== January 11, 1953 (Sunday) ==
- New Zealand's Social Credit Political League was formed from the earlier Social Credit Association.
- Died: Ernst Herman van Rappard, 53, Dutch Nazi leader, of a brain haemorrhage while serving a life sentence in prison

== January 12, 1953 (Monday) ==
- Estonian émigrés established a government-in-exile in Oslo, Norway.

== January 13, 1953 (Tuesday) ==
- "Doctors' plot": The Soviet Union's state newspaper Pravda published an article alleging that many of the most prestigious physicians in the country, mostly Jews, were part of a major plot to poison the country's senior political and military leaders.
- The 1953 Yugoslav Constitutional Law, a set of constitutional amendments, came into force in Yugoslavia. Among other things, this established a Federal People's Assembly with two houses: a Federal Chamber, directly representing the regions, and a Chamber of Producers, representing economic enterprises and worker groups.
- KOLD TV channel 13 in Tucson, AZ (CBS) begins broadcasting.
- Died: Edward Marsh, 80, English polymath and civil servant

== January 14, 1953 (Wednesday) ==
- Marshal Josip Broz Tito was chosen to be President of Yugoslavia.
- The CIA-sponsored Robertson Panel met for the first time to discuss the recent wave of UFO incidents reported in the United States.

== January 15, 1953 (Thursday) ==
- Georg Dertinger, foreign minister of East Germany, was arrested on suspicion of espionage.
- British security forces in West Germany arrest 7 members of the Naumann Circle, a clandestine Neo-Nazi organization, attempting to infiltrate the Free Democratic Party and eventually restore Nazism.
- The Federal Express, a passenger train carrying 41 people, crashed through the Washington Union Station's track buffers and smashed into the main waiting room floor.

== January 16, 1953 (Friday) ==
- A United States Air Force Douglas C-54D-5-DC Skymaster crashed on its final approach to Ernest Harmon Air Force Base in Stephenville, Newfoundland, Canada, with 14 people on board. Only one survived.
- Died: Solomon Carter Fuller, 80, Liberian neurologist, psychiatrist, pathologist and teacher, one of the first black psychiatrists

== January 17, 1953 (Saturday) ==
- The 1953 Iraqi parliamentary election ended in victory for the Constitutional Union Party. Only 57 seats of the 135 seats were contested, and the Constitutional Union Party won 67.

== January 18, 1953 (Sunday) ==
- The 1953 Guatemalan parliamentary election ended with the Revolutionary Action Party as the biggest party.
- The first elections to the new Assembly of French Polynesia took place, after it replaced the Representative Assembly. The Democratic Rally of the Tahitian People (RDPT) won a majority.
- Sinn Féin, Ireland's republican party, decided that it would contest all 12 constituencies in Northern Ireland in the next Westminster election.
- The Argentine Grand Prix was held in Buenos Aires and was won by Alberto Ascari of Italy, in a Ferrari, beginning the Formula One season, though the race was run according to Formula Two regulations because of a shortage of Formula One cars. Crowd control became impossible and a near-riot contributed to several crashes. Reports suggest that several spectators were killed.

== January 19, 1953 (Monday) ==
- CBS showed "Lucy Goes to the Hospital", an episode of I Love Lucy in which Lucy (played by Lucille Ball) gives birth to her son. An estimated 44 million people in the United States watched the episode, more than would watch Dwight Eisenhower's inauguration the following day.
- Born: Desi Arnaz Jr., at Cedars-Sinai Medical Center in Los Angeles, California, to Lucille Ball and Desi Arnaz. Later in the day, Lucy fictitiously gave birth to "Little Ricky" on screen.

== January 20, 1953 (Tuesday) ==
- Dwight D. Eisenhower was sworn in as 34th President of the United States.
- Born: Jeffrey Epstein, American financier and convicted sex offender (d. 2019)

== January 21, 1953 (Wednesday) ==
- Born: Larisa Shoigu, Russian politician, in Chadan (died 2021)
- Died: Mary Mannering, 76, English stage actress

== January 22, 1953 (Thursday) ==
- The Crucible, a drama by Arthur Miller, opened on Broadway in New York. The play was an allegory of McCarthyism in the United States.

== January 24, 1953 (Saturday) ==
- Mau Mau Uprising: Rebels in Kenya murdered the Ruck family (Dr Roger Ruck, his pregnant wife Esme, and their young son). News of the death caused outrage.
- Walter Ulbricht announced that agriculture would be collectivized in East Germany.
- Born: Moon Jae-in, 19th President of the Republic of Korea

== January 25, 1953 (Sunday) ==
- Russian speed skater Yuri Sergeev broke his own world record for the 500 metres, at Medeu in Kazakhstan, with a time of 0.40,9.

== January 26, 1953 (Monday) ==
- In mountains near Sinnai, on the Italian island of Sardinia, a Linee Aeree Italiane Douglas C-47-DL Skytrain lost its left wing as a result of overstressing and crashed in mountainous terrain, killing all 19 people on board.

== January 27, 1953 (Tuesday) ==
- The Canadian Dental Association recommended the fluoridation of drinking water.

== January 28, 1953 (Wednesday) ==
- Died
  - Derek Bentley, 19, English criminal, hanged for murder at Wandsworth Prison in London while protests took place outside. Bentley's case would become a cause célèbre because the sentencing did not take account of his mental condition and the fact that he had not fired the shots that killed the police officer, which were fired by a minor who escaped capital punishment.
  - James Scullin, 76, 9th Prime Minister of Australia

== January 29, 1953 (Thursday) ==
- Born: Teresa Teng, Taiwanese singer, in Yunlin County (d. 1995)

== January 30, 1953 (Friday) ==
- Born: Steven Zaillian, US screenwriter, director, film editor, and producer, in Fresno, California

== January 31, 1953 (Saturday) ==
- North Sea flood of 1953: Flooding broke out in the Netherlands and the United Kingdom, continuing until February 1 and eventually resulting in the deaths of more than 2,000 people.
- Died: Maynard Sinclair, MP, 56, Northern Ireland Finance Minister and Deputy Prime Minister, and Sir Walter Smiles, 69, Ulster Unionist MP for North Down, both passengers on board MV Princess Victoria, an Irish Sea ferry, which sank in stormy weather, resulting in 133 confirmed deaths. A further 44 people were rescued by other ships.
