= May 1953 =

Month of 1953

<<	May 1953					>>
Su	Mo	Tu	We	Th	Fr	Sa
					1	2
3	4	5	6	7	8	9
10	11	12	13	14	15	16
17	18	19	20	21	22	23
24	25	26	27	28	29	30
31

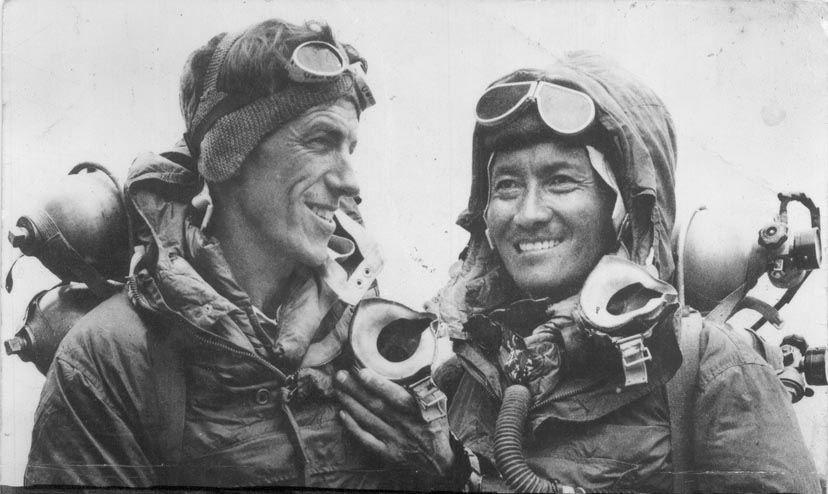
Edmund Hillary (left) and Tenzing Norgay in 1953

The following events occurred in May 1953:

== May 1, 1953 (Friday) ==
- Rot-Weiss Essen won the final of the 1952–53 DFB-Pokal football tournament at the Rheinstadion in Düsseldorf, Germany.
- Born:
  - Mayumi Aoki, Japanese Olympic champion swimmer; in Yamaga, Kumamoto
  - Glen Ballard (born Basil Glen Ballard Jr.), American songwriter and record producer; in Natchez, Mississippi
- Died: Everett Shinn, 76, American painter

== May 2, 1953 (Saturday) ==
- BOAC Flight 783 broke up in midair and crashed near Calcutta, India, killing all 43 people aboard.
- Hussein was crowned King of Jordan. On the same day, Faisal II, Hussein's cousin, assumed his constitutional powers as King of Iraq.
- The FA Cup Final was held at Wembley Stadium in London, UK. It would become known as the "Matthews Final" as a result of Blackpool winger Stanley Matthews scoring a hat-trick to enable his team to defeat Bolton Wanderers.
- Dark Star, ridden by Henry Moreno, won the 1953 Kentucky Derby at Churchill Downs in Louisville, Kentucky, United States.
- Born:
  - Valery Gergiev, Russian-Ossetian conductor; in Moscow, Russian Soviet Federative Socialist Republic
  - Jamaal Wilkes (born Jackson Keith Wilkes), American basketball player; in Berkeley, California
- Died: Wallace Bryant, 89, American Olympic archer and portraitist

== May 3, 1953 (Sunday) ==
- Belgian rider Alois De Hertog won the 39th Liège–Bastogne–Liège cycle race.
- The 67th All-Ireland Senior Hurling Championship began in Ireland.
- Born:
  - Bruce Hall, American musician and singer (REO Speedwagon); in Champaign, Illinois
  - Jake Hooker (born Jerry Mamberg), Israeli-American guitarist and songwriter; in Haifa, Israel (d. 2014)
  - Gary Young, American musician, in Mamaroneck, New York (d. 2023)

== May 4, 1953 (Monday) ==
- American author Ernest Hemingway won the Pulitzer Prize for Fiction for The Old Man and the Sea.
- Born:
  - Masashi Ebara (born Masashi Ehara), Japanese actor and voice actor; in Kanagawa Prefecture
  - Pia Zadora (born Pia Alfreda Schipani), American actress and singer
- Died:
  - T. Tertius Noble, 85, English-born organist and composer
  - Alexandre Pharamond, 76, French Olympic champion rugby union player
  - Edward Shanks, 60, English writer, war poet and journalist

== May 5, 1953 (Tuesday) ==
- All Kwangaku won the 33rd Emperor's Cup Final (association football) in Kyoto, Japan.
- Aldous Huxley tried the psychedelic hallucinogen mescaline for the first time, inspiring his book The Doors of Perception.
- Born:
  - Ibrahim Zakzaky, Nigerian Shia Islam cleric; in Zaria
  - Dieter Zetsche, German auto executive; in Istanbul, Turkey

== May 6, 1953 (Wednesday) ==
- In Chile, the 1953 Concepción earthquake caused significant damage and killed twelve people.
- Born:
  - Aleksandr Akimov, Soviet engineer who was the shift supervisor during the events of the Chernobyl disaster; in Novosibirsk, Russian SFSR (d. 1986, acute radiation syndrome)
  - Tony Blair, Prime Minister of the United Kingdom; in Edinburgh
  - Michelle Courchesne, Canadian politician; in Trois-Rivières, Quebec
  - Ülle Rajasalu, Estonian politician
  - Graeme Souness, Scottish footballer and manager; in Edinburgh

== May 7, 1953 (Thursday) ==
- Born:
  - Pat McInally, US National Football League punter and wide receiver; in Villa Park, California
  - Ian McKay, British soldier, Victoria Cross recipient; in Wortley, South Yorkshire (d. 1982, killed in action)
- Died: Ormerod Pearse, 68, South African cricketer, coronary thrombosis

== May 8, 1953 (Friday) ==
- Born:
  - Billy Burnette, American musician; in Memphis, Tennessee
  - Alex Van Halen, Dutch-born American rock musician; in Amsterdam
- Died: Anna Rüling, 72, German journalist, "the first known lesbian activist"

== May 9, 1953 (Saturday) ==
- France agreed to the provisional independence of Cambodia, with King Norodom Sihanouk.
- 1953 Australian Senate election: The Liberal/Country Coalition Government, led by Prime Minister Robert Menzies, retained its Senate majority, despite gains made by the Labor Party, led by H. V. Evatt. This was the first time a Senate election was held without an accompanying House of Representatives election.
- Born: Bruno Brokken, Belgian high jumper; in Wilrijk

== May 10, 1953 (Sunday) ==
- The town of Chemnitz, East Germany, became Karl Marx Stadt.
- The Tour de Romandie ended in Martigny, Switzerland, won by Hugo Koblet.
- Born:
  - John Diamond, British journalist and author; in London (d. 2001)
  - Tito Santana (born Merced Solis), American professional wrestler; in Mission, Texas

== May 11, 1953 (Monday) ==
- As part of the 1953 Waco tornado outbreak, an F5 tornado hit the downtown section of Waco, Texas, killing 114.
- Born: David Gest, American entertainer, producer and television personality; in Los Angeles, California (d. 2016)
- Died: Jean Adair (born Violet McNaughton), 79, Canadian actress

== May 12, 1953 (Tuesday) ==
- Died: American test pilot Jean "Skip" Ziegler, 33, and his observer Frank Wolko, were both killed in the explosion of a Bell X-2 research aircraft in the bomb bay of a Boeing B-50 Superfortress over Lake Ontario. The X-2 fell into Lake Ontario, and it and Ziegler and Wolko's bodies were never found.

== May 13, 1953 (Wednesday) ==
- Born:
  - Zlatko Burić, Croatian-Danish actor; in Osijek, People's Republic of Croatia, Socialist Federal Republic of Yugoslavia
  - Ruth A. David, American electrical engineer; in Arkansas City, Kansas
  - Gerry Sutcliffe, English politician; in Salford
  - Harm Wiersma, Dutch draughts player and politician; in Leeuwarden

== May 14, 1953 (Thursday) ==
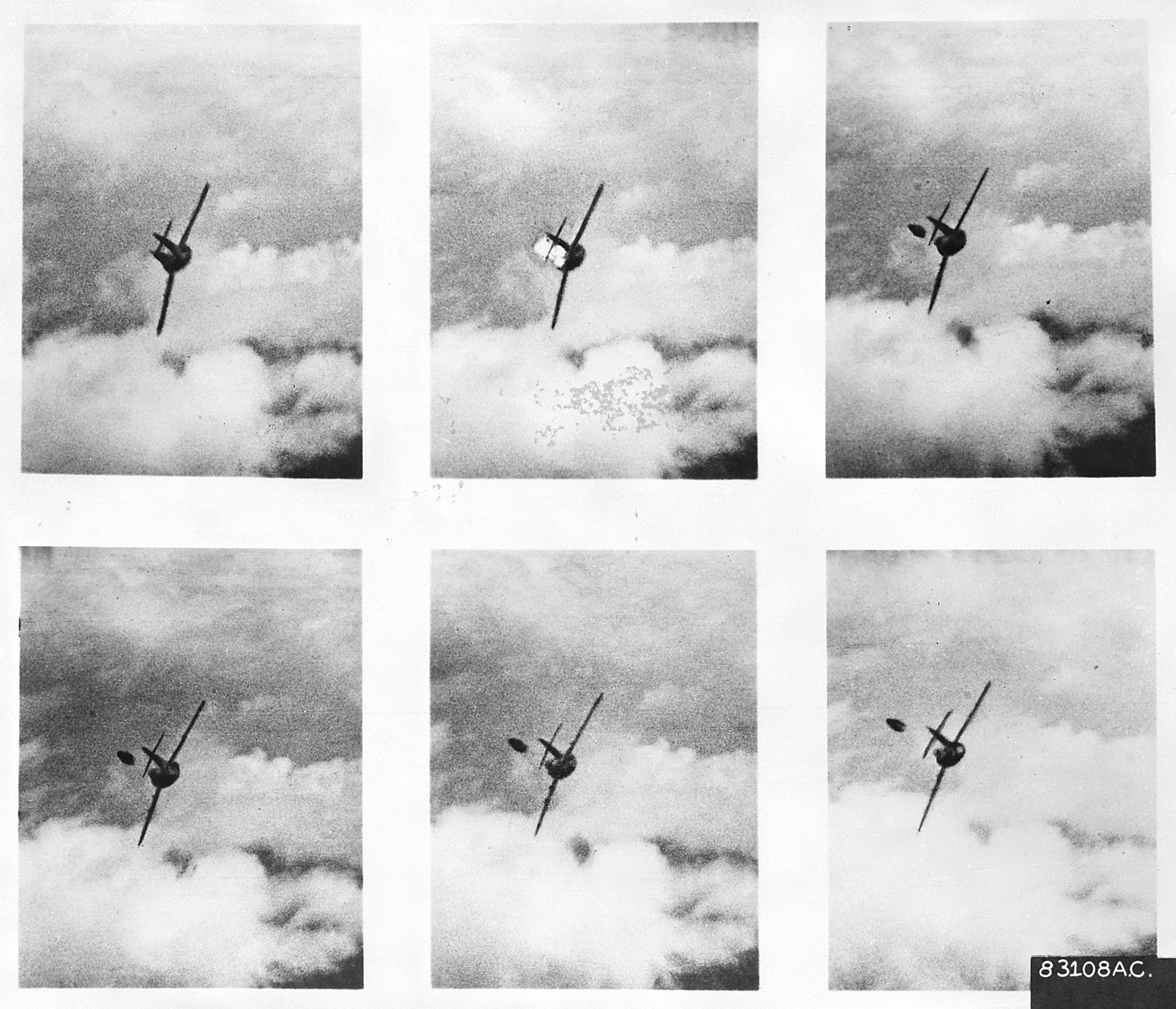
Images from Aldrin's gun camera of the MiG pilot bailing out

- Future U.S. astronaut Edwin Eugene Aldrin Jr., who would participate in the first crewed Moon landing in 1969, scored his first confirmed kill as a U.S. Air Force fighter pilot in the Korean War. Flying a North American F-86 Sabre, Aldrin shot down a MiG-15 about 5 miles (8.0 km) south of the Yalu River. The MiG pilot ejected from the aircraft.
- Over 7,000 brewery workers in Milwaukee, United States, performed a walkout, marking the start of the 1953 Milwaukee brewery strike.
- The passenger liners SS Arcadia and SS Orsova were launched, in Clydebank, Scotland, and Barrow-in-Furness, England, respectively.
- Born:
  - Tom Cochrane, Canadian musician (Red Rider); in Lynn Lake, Manitoba
  - Norodom Sihamoni, King of Cambodia; in Phnom Penh
  - Hywel Williams, Welsh politician; in Pwllheli
- Died: Yasuo Kuniyoshi, 63, Japanese-American painter and photographer, of cancer

== May 15, 1953 (Friday) ==
- Rioting began in Kano, Nigeria. The riot would last until May 18 and result in at least 36 deaths and 241 injuries.
- The ICAO Council adopted the Standards and Recommended Practices (SARPS) for Aeronautical Information Service (AIS). These SARPS are in Annex 15 to the Chicago Convention, and 15 May is celebrated by the AIS community as "World AIS Day".
- Born:
  - George Brett, American Major League Baseball third baseman; in Glen Dale, West Virginia
  - Athene Donald (born Athene Margaret Griffith), English physicist; in London
  - Mike Oldfield, English composer (Tubular Bells); in Reading, Berkshire
- Died: Chet Miller, 50, American racing driver, as a result of a crash during practice for Indianapolis 500

== May 16, 1953 (Saturday) ==
- Born:
  - Pierce Brosnan, Irish actor; in Drogheda, County Louth
  - Kitanoumi Toshimitsu, Japanese sumo wrestler, the 55th yokozuna; in Hokkaido (d. 2015)
  - David Maclean, Scottish politician; in Cromarty
  - Peter Onorati, American actor; in Boonton, New Jersey
  - Richard Page, American musician; in Keokuk, Iowa
- Died:
  - Nicolae Rădescu, 79, Romanian military officer and statesman, 45th Prime Minister of Romania, of tuberculosis
  - Django Reinhardt (born Jean Reinhardt), 43, Belgian jazz musician, stroke

== May 17, 1953 (Sunday) ==
- Born: Luca Prodan, Italian–Scottish musician and singer; in Rome (d. 1987, heart attack or cirrhosis of the liver)

== May 18, 1953 (Monday) ==
- At Rogers Dry Lake in the United States, Californian Jacqueline Cochran became the first woman to exceed Mach 1, in a North American F-86 Sabre at 652.337 mph (566.865 kn; 1,049.835 km/h).
- Born: Alan Kupperberg, American comics artist; in New York City (d. 2015)

== May 19, 1953 (Tuesday) ==
- Born:
  - Patrick Hodge, Scottish lawyer and judge
  - Shavarsh Karapetyan, Armenian finswimmer; in Kirovakan, Armenian Soviet Socialist Republic, Soviet Union
  - Florin Marin, Romanian footballer and manager; in Bucharest (d. 2025)
  - Victoria Wood, English comedian, actress, writer and musician; in Prestwich, Lancashire (d. 2016)
- Died: Dámaso Berenguer, 79, Spanish soldier and Prime Minister

== May 20, 1953 (Wednesday) ==
- Born:
  - Robert Doyle, Australian politician; in Melbourne, Victoria
  - Norbert Siegmann, German footballer
- Died: Angel Figueroa, 23, Puerto Rican Olympic boxer, was killed in action at the Punchbowl while fighting in the Korean War.

== May 21, 1953 (Thursday) ==
- A tornado caused widespread destruction in Port Huron, Michigan, United States, and Sarnia and London Township, Ontario, Canada, killing seven people.
- Born:
  - Nora Aunor (born Nora Cabaltera Villamayor), Filipino actress and recording artist; in Iriga, Camarines Sur (d. 2025)
  - Jim Devine, British politician; in Blackburn, West Lothian, Scotland
- Died: Ernst Zermelo, 81, German logician and mathematician

== May 22, 1953 (Friday) ==
- Born:
  - François Bon, French writer and translator; in Luçon, Vendée
  - Cha Bum-kun, South Korean footballer and manager; in Hwaseong, Gyeonggi
  - Paul Mariner, English footballer and coach; in Farnworth (d. 2021)

== May 23, 1953 (Saturday) ==
- Born: Agathe Uwilingiyimana, 4th Prime Minister of Rwanda; in Nyaruhengeri, Butare, Ruanda-Urundi (d. 1994, assassinated)

== May 24, 1953 (Sunday) ==
- Pope Pius XII issued the encyclical Doctor Mellifluus, commemorating the forthcoming 800th anniversary of the death of Bernard of Clairvaux.
- Born: Alfred Molina, English actor; in Paddington, London

== May 25, 1953 (Monday) ==
- The Battle of the Nevada Complex began between United Nations Command and Chinese forces. The battle would conclude on May 29 with the withdrawal of UN forces from their positions.

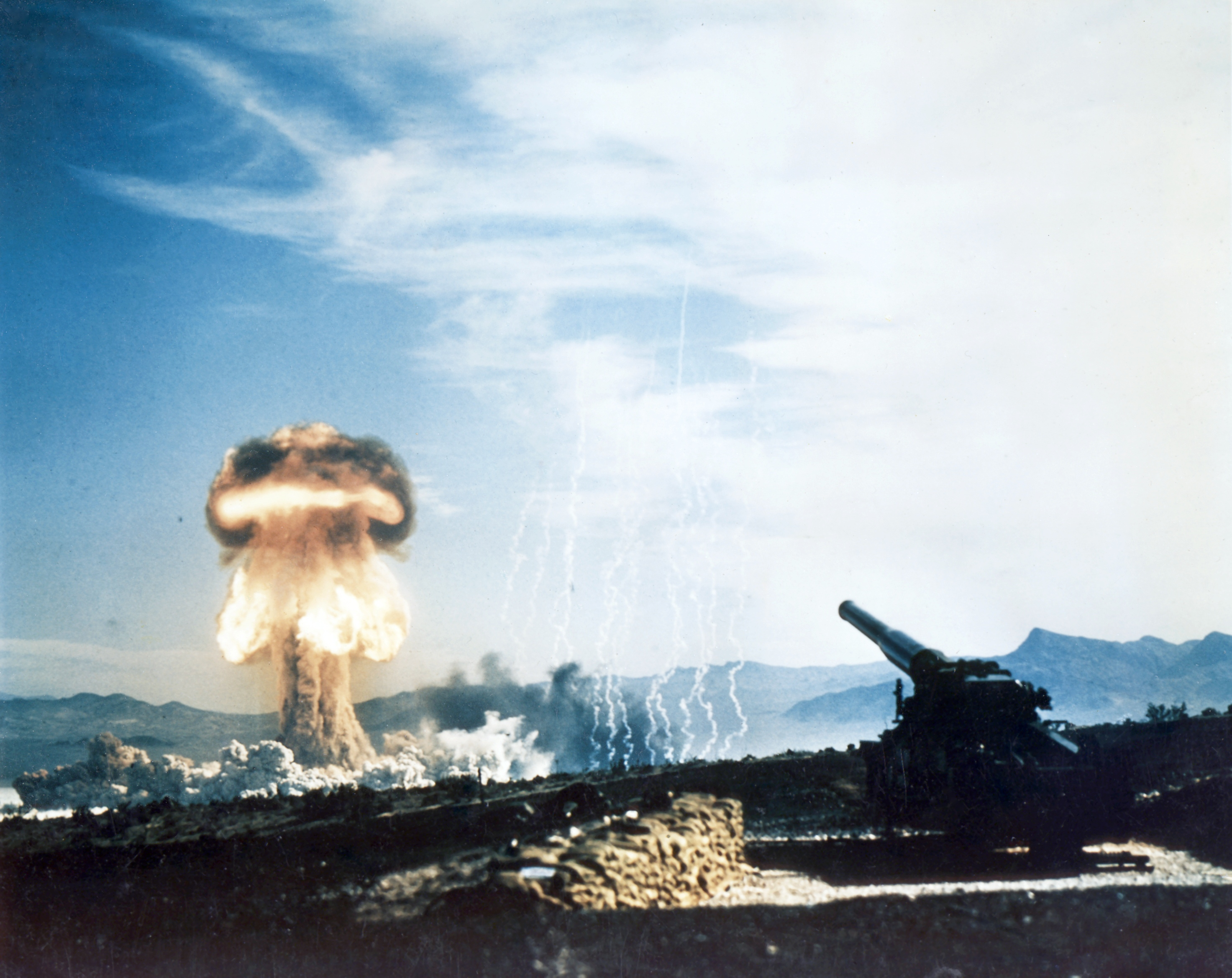
Upshot-Knothole Grable test

- At the Nevada Test Site, the United States conducted its only nuclear artillery test, Upshot-Knothole Grable, at 15:30 GMT.
- At 5:00 p.m., the first public television station in the United States officially began broadcasting as KUHT from the campus of the University of Houston.
- Born:
  - Daniel Passarella, Argentine footballer; in Chacabuco, Buenos Aires, Argentina
  - Stan Sakai (born Masahiko Sakai), Japanese-born American comic artist; in Kyoto
  - Gaetano Scirea, Italian footballer; in Cernusco sul Naviglio (d. 1989)
  - V (born Eve Ensler), American playwright, feminist and activist; in New York City

== May 26, 1953 (Tuesday) ==
- A second round of voting took place in the 1953 Rajya Sabha elections in India, electing members to the upper chamber.
- Born:
  - Kay Hagan (born Janet Kay Ruthven), American lawyer, banking executive and politician; in Shelby, North Carolina (d. 2019, complications of Powassan virus)
  - Don McAllister, English footballer and manager; in Radcliffe, Lancashire, England
  - Michael Portillo, English politician, journalist and broadcaster; in Bushey, Hertfordshire

== May 27, 1953 (Wednesday) ==
- Died: Jesse Burkett, 84, American baseball left fielder (Cleveland Spiders) and member of the MLB Hall of Fame

== May 28, 1953 (Thursday) ==
- The Third Battle of the Hook began near Panmunjom, North Korea, fought between primarily British and Chinese forces. The battle would conclude the following morning and result in retention of the existing positions by both sides.
- Denmark held a referendum on the constitution and electoral age. Voters approved both proposals, leading to a new Danish constitution taking effect on 5 June, and the electoral age being lowered from 25 to 23 years on the same day.
- Born: Pierre Gauthier, Canadian National Hockey League general manager; in Montreal
- Died: Tatsuo Hori, 48, Japanese author and translator, tuberculosis

== May 29, 1953 (Friday) ==
- Two members of the 1953 British Mount Everest expedition, Sir Edmund Hillary from New Zealand and Tenzing Norgay from Nepal, became the first humans to reach the summit of Mount Everest.
- Born:
  - Aleksandr Abdulov, Russian actor; in Tobolsk, Russian SFSR (d. 2008, lung cancer)
  - Danny Elfman, American composer; in Los Angeles, California
- Died:
  - Man Mountain Dean (born Frank Simmons Leavitt), 61, American professional wrestler, heart attack
  - Morgan Russell, 67, American artist

== May 30, 1953 (Saturday) ==
- Bill Vukovich won the 1953 Indianapolis 500 motor race at the Indianapolis Motor Speedway, United States. Driver Carl Scarborough died of hyperthermia after dropping out of the race.
- Born:
  - Pierluigi Camiscioni, Italian rugby union player and stuntman; in San Benedetto del Tronto (d. 2020)
  - Jim Hunter, Canadian Olympic alpine skier; in Shaunavon, Saskatchewan
  - Colm Meaney, Irish actor; in Dublin
- Died:
  - Carl Scarborough, 38, American racecar driver, hyperthermia during Indianapolis 500
  - Dooley Wilson, 67, American actor, singer and musician

== May 31, 1953 (Sunday) ==
- 16-year-old Barbara Songhurst and 18-year-old Christine Reed were raped and murdered on a towpath near Teddington Lock on the River Thames. Alfred Charles Whiteway would be convicted of the murders and hanged on December 22, 1953.
- The French Tennis Championships (later the French Open) came to an end, with Ken Rosewall defeating Vic Seixas to win the Men's Singles competition.
- The Coupe de France Final was held at Stade Olympique Yves-du-Manoir, Colombes, France, won by Lille OSC, who defeated FC Nancy.
- Born: Pirkka-Pekka Petelius, Finnish actor and politician; in Alatornio
- Died: Vladimir Tatlin, 67, Soviet and Russian painter and architect
