= February 1953 =

Month of 1953

<<	February 1953					>>
Su	Mo	Tu	We	Th	Fr	Sa
1	2	3	4	5	6	7
8	9	10	11	12	13	14
15	16	17	18	19	20	21
22	23	24	25	26	27	28

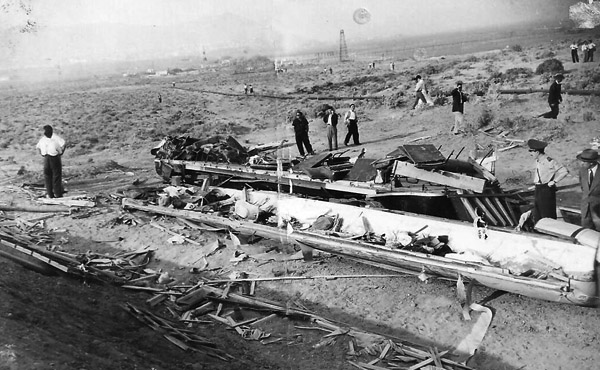
Aftermath of the Comodoro Rivadavia rail disaster in Argentina.

The following events occurred in February 1953:

== February 1, 1953 (Sunday) ==
- JOAK-TV began broadcasting from Tokyo, the first television station in Japan.
- The surge of the North Sea flood continued from the previous day:
  - The Groenendijk, a section of the Schielands Hoge Zeedijk (Schielands High Seadyke) in the Netherlands, began to collapse. The river ship de Twee Gebroeders, commanded by Captain Arie Evegroen, was successfully used to plug the hole in the dyke.
  - An S-class submarine, HMS Sirdar, was swamped by floods while in drydock at Sheerness Dockyard in the UK. It sank but was later raised and repaired.
  - Two British police officers, Inspector Charles Lewis and Constable Leonard Deptford of the Lincolnshire Constabulary, carried out heroic rescue operations when the sea wall was breached. Both would later receive the George Medal.
- The 1953 NASCAR Grand National Series in the United States began with a race at Palm Beach Speedway, won by Lee Petty.
- Died: Archibald Nicoll, 66, New Zealand artist

== February 2, 1953 (Monday) ==
- A Skyways Limited Avro York, carrying 39 people from Lajes Field in the Azores to Gander, Newfoundland, disappeared over the North Atlantic Ocean. Its fate was never discovered.
- Died: Alan Curtis, 43, American actor, of heart failure

== February 3, 1953 (Tuesday) ==
- Batepá massacre: Hundreds of São Tomé's native creoles, known as forros, were killed by the colonial administration and Portuguese landowners when a rebellion was anticipated.

== February 4, 1953 (Wednesday) ==
- Born:
  - Jerome Powell, American investment banker and attorney, 16th Chair of the Federal Reserve (2018-present) in Washington D.C.
  - Kitarō, Japanese musician composer, record producer and arranger, in Toyohashi

== February 5, 1953 (Thursday) ==
- Walt Disney's feature film Peter Pan was released in US cinemas, initially as a double feature with the True-Life Adventures documentary short, Bear Country.
- Sweet rationing ended in the UK.
- Died: Iuliu Maniu, Romanian politician (b. 1873)

== February 6, 1953 (Friday) ==
- English contralto Kathleen Ferrier, terminally ill with cancer, was taken from Covent Garden Opera House in London on a stretcher after forcing herself to complete the second night of her run in Gluck's Orfeo ed Euridice.

== February 7, 1953 (Saturday) ==
- A Douglas C-54A-5-DC Skymaster operated by Union Aéromaritime de Transport crashed into trees on its approach to Bordeaux–Mérignac Airport in Bordeaux, France; nine of the 21 people on board were killed.
- Born: Dan Quisenberry, American baseball pitcher, in Santa Monica, California (d. 1998)

== February 8, 1953 (Sunday) ==
- The 1953 World Figure Skating Championships opened in Davos, Switzerland.
- Born: Mary Steenburgen, American actress, in Newport, Arkansas

== February 9, 1953 (Monday) ==
- A Curtiss C-46D Commando of the Egyptian Air Force, carrying 35 people, crashed in the desert east of Cairo, killing all but five of the occupants.
- In Scotland, the Fraserburgh life-boat John and Charles Kennedy capsized while on its way to escort fishing vessels into harbour during a storm. Six crew members were killed.
- Died: Cecil Hepworth, English director (b. 1874)

== February 10, 1953 (Tuesday) ==
- A Fairchild C-119C-18-FA Flying Boxcar of the United States Air Force crashed on approach to Bitburg Air Base, West Germany, during a snowstorm, killing all five occupants.

== February 11, 1953 (Wednesday) ==
- US President Dwight D. Eisenhower refused a clemency appeal for spies Julius and Ethel Rosenberg.
- The Soviet Union broke diplomatic relations with Israel after a bomb explosion at the Soviet embassy in reaction to the "Doctors' plot".
- Born: Jeb Bush, American politician, Governor of Florida and 2016 Republican presidential candidate, in Midland, Texas, to George H. W. Bush and Barbara Bush

== February 12, 1953 (Thursday) ==
- The 1953 Torud earthquake, with an intensity of 6.6, killed at least 800 people in the Great Salt Kavir area of Torud, Semnan, Iran.
- The Nordic Council was inaugurated.
- Died: Hal Colebatch, 80, Australian politician, briefly Premier of Western Australia

== February 13, 1953 (Friday) ==
- The Central Unitaria de Traballadores (CUT) was created, bringing together the majority of Chile's trade unions.
- Christine Jorgensen, one of the first American transsexuals to undergo successful sexual reassignment surgery in Denmark, returned home to New York.

== February 14, 1953 (Saturday) ==
- In Australia, two state elections took place, following recent boundary changes. In New South Wales, the result was a landslide victory for the Labor Party, led by Joseph Cahill. Labor also won in Western Australia, under Albert Hawke.
- A partial solar eclipse occurred.

== February 15, 1953 (Sunday) ==
- Comodoro Rivadavia rail disaster: 36 people were killed and 65 injured when an overloaded railbus was derailed on a sharp bend at Punta Piedras, near Comodoro Rivadavia in the Patagonian province of Chubut, Argentina.
- In the Paraguayan general election, incumbent president candidate Federico Chávez was re-elected unopposed, the Colorado Party being the only party permitted by the country's laws.
- In the Liechtenstein general election, the Progressive Citizens' Party won eight of the 15 seats in the Landtag and remained in coalition with the Patriotic Union.
- The devalued South Korean Won was replaced by a new currency, the Hwan.

== February 16, 1953 (Monday) ==
- The Pakistan Academy of Sciences was established in Lahore, during the fifth Pakistan Science Conference.

== February 17, 1953 (Tuesday) ==
- Edward Short, MP, complained to the Secretary of State for War, James Hutchison, in the UK Parliament about the failure to provide individual headstones for Chelsea Pensioners in Brookwood Cemetery, saying, "Is it not a shocking disgrace that these fine old Pensioners should have their graves marked only by a peg in the ground with a number attached to it?" Following a campaign, the graves were placed in the care of the Commonwealth War Graves Commission.

== February 18, 1953 (Wednesday) ==
- The KOLN (Channel 10) TV station began broadcasting on Channel 12 in Lincoln, Nebraska, United States.

== February 19, 1953 (Thursday) ==
- The US state of Georgia introduced a book censorship board.
- Born:
  - Cristina Fernández de Kirchner, Argentine politician, President of Argentina 2007–2015, in Tolosa, La Plata
  - Conrad Murray, American physician convicted of involuntary manslaughter in the death of Michael Jackson, in Saint Andrew Parish, British Grenada
- Died: Nobutake Kondō, Japanese admiral (b. 1886)

== February 20, 1953 (Friday) ==
- Born: Riccardo Chailly, Italian orchestral conductor, in Milan

== February 21, 1953 (Saturday) ==
- An explosion destroyed the Nitroform Products Company plant in Newark, New Jersey, United States.

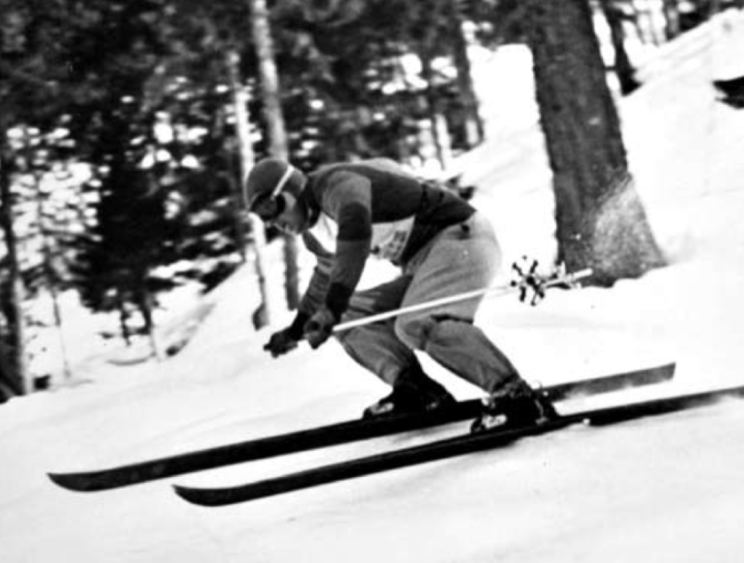
Ilio Colli

- Died: Ilio Colli, Italian Olympic downhill skier, training crash (b. 1931)

== February 22, 1953 (Sunday) ==
- The South American Championship football tournament began, hosted by Peru after Paraguay dropped out because of the lack of a suitable stadium.
- Born: Geoffrey Perkins, British comedy producer, writer, actor (d. 2008)

== February 23, 1953 (Monday) ==
- Following elections in the Australian state of New South Wales, the new ministry, led by Joe Cahill of the Labor Party, took power.
- Died: Sir Cecil Hunter-Rodwell, British colonial administrator (b. 1874)

== February 25, 1953 (Wednesday) ==
- Jacques Tati's film Les Vacances de M. Hulot, introducing the gauche character of Monsieur Hulot, was released in France.
- Born: Martin Kippenberger, German artist, in Dortmund (d. 1997)
- Died: Sergei Winogradsky, Russian scientist (b. 1856)

== February 26, 1953 (Thursday) ==
- A week before Joseph Stalin's unexpected death, US bishop Fulton J. Sheen, at the end of his weekly TV show, Life Is Worth Living, read the assassination scene from Shakespeare's Julius Caesar, with the names of high-ranking Soviet officials replacing the main characters, concluding that "Stalin must one day meet his judgment".
- A British cargo ship ran aground at Huglen, Norway.
- Born: Michael Bolton, American singer and songwriter, as Michael Bolotin, in New Haven, Connecticut

== February 27, 1953 (Friday) ==
- The London Agreement on German External Debts was concluded by the major parties, writing off 50% of repayable war debt owed by the Federal Republic of Germany to its creditors.
- Born: Oleg Moliboga, Ukrainian/Soviet volleyball player and coach, in Dnipro, Ukrainian Soviet Socialist Republic (d. 2022)

== February 28, 1953 (Saturday) ==
- Greece, Turkey, and Yugoslavia signed the Balkan Pact (Agreement of Friendship and Cooperation) in Ankara.
- James Watson and Francis Crick of the University of Cambridge publicly claimed to have discovered the structure of the DNA molecule.
- Joseph Stalin held a party at his Volynskoe dacha. The party broke up at 4 AM the following day, March 1, 1953.
