= September 1953 =

Month of 1953

<<	September 1953					>>
Su	Mo	Tu	We	Th	Fr	Sa
		1	2	3	4	5
6	7	8	9	10	11	12
13	14	15	16	17	18	19
20	21	22	23	24	25	26
27	28	29	30

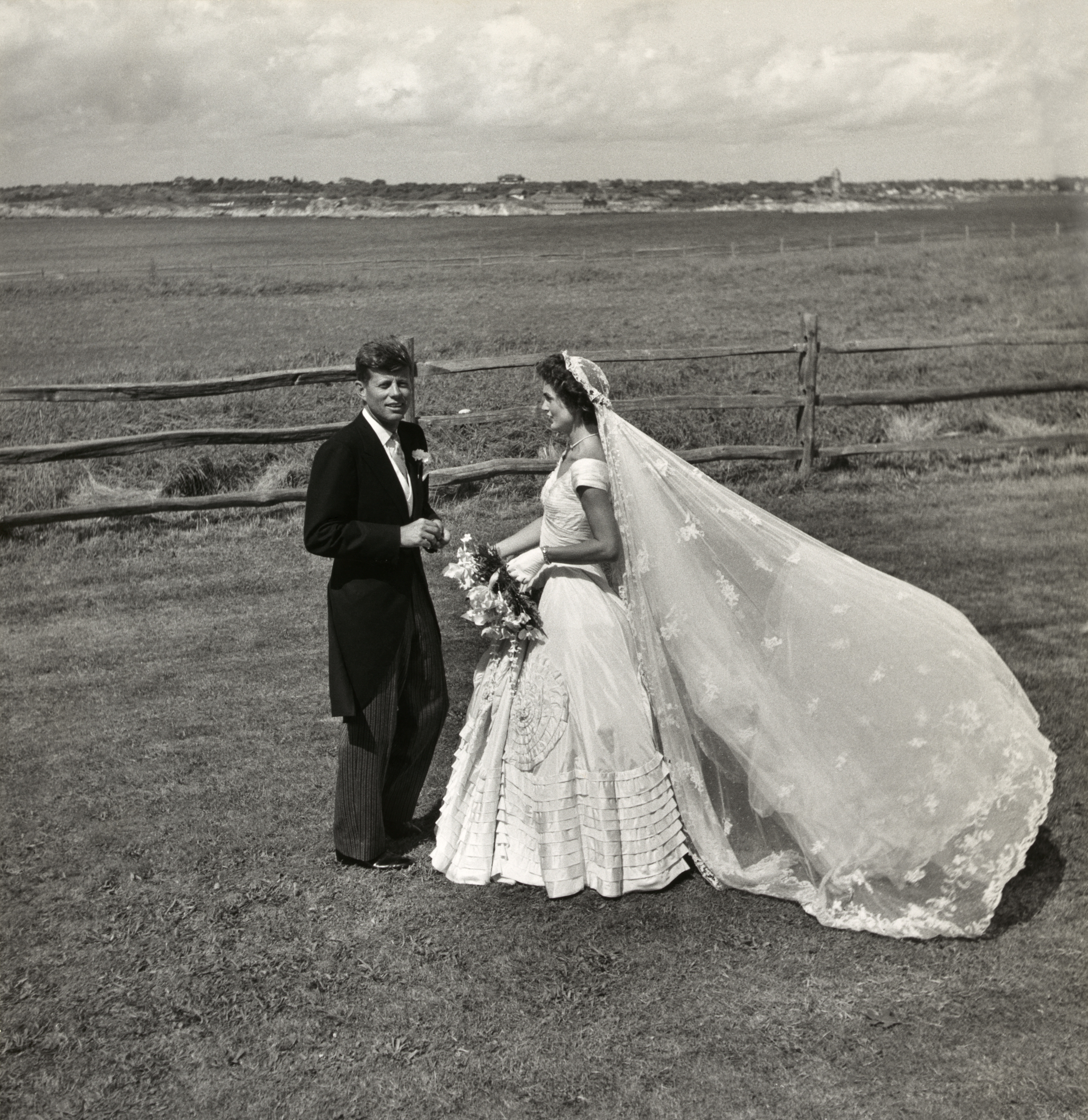
September 12, 1953: John F. Kennedy and Jacqueline Bouvier on their wedding day

The following events occurred in September 1953:

== September 1, 1953 (Tuesday) ==
- Air France Flight 178, a Lockheed L-749A Constellation (registration F-BAZZ) travelling to Nice, France, crashed into the side of Mount Cimet in the Maritime Alps 80 kilometers (50 miles) northeast of its destination. All 42 people on board were killed.
- The world's first jet-to-jet aerial refueling took place when a United States Air Force KB-47 Stratojet tanker refueled a B-47 Stratojet bomber.
- A charter flight operated by Regina Cargo Airlines in the United States involving a Douglas C-47K Skytrain (registration N19941) carrying military personnel from Fort Ord to McChord Air Force Base, crashed near Vail, Washington, killing all 21 occupants.
- Died: Jacques Thibaud, 72, French violinist, killed in the crash of Air France Flight 178

== September 2, 1953 (Wednesday) ==
- Born: John Zorn, American composer and saxophonist, in New York City

== September 3, 1953 (Thursday) ==
- Born: Jean-Pierre Jeunet, French film director, in Roanne

== September 4, 1953 (Friday) ==
- Researchers Eugene Aserinsky and Nathaniel Kleitman first published the discovery of rapid eye movement sleep.

== September 5, 1953 (Saturday) ==
- The United Nations rejected the Soviet Union's proposal to accept China as a member.
- Died:
  - Constantin Levaditi, 79, Romanian physician and microbiologist
  - Clarrie Martin, 53, Australian politician, of a haemorrhage from a duodenal ulcer

== September 6, 1953 (Sunday) ==
- In the West German federal election, Chancellor Konrad Adenauer and his Christian Democratic Union retained power, governing in a broad coalition (two-thirds majority) with most of the minor parties.
- Walter Winchell, a well-known radio commentator, accuses Lucille Ball of having been a member of the Communist Party.

== September 7, 1953 (Monday) ==
- Nikita Khrushchev became head of the Soviet Central Committee.
- Hurricane Carol caused the Panamanian cargo ship Eugenia to be driven ashore at Provincetown, Massachusetts, United States. The crew were taken off by means of a breeches buoy.
- The US fishing vessel Lomela was destroyed by fire in the Gulf of Alaska approximately 19 nautical miles (35 km; 22 mi) southeast of Kodiak, Alaska.
- Cork defeated Galway in the final of the 1953 All-Ireland Senior Hurling Championship.
- Died: Nobuyuki Abe, 77, Japanese politician, Prime Minister 1939-1940

== September 8, 1953 (Tuesday) ==
- The French ocean liner Liberté ran aground at Le Havre but was refloated the same day.

== September 9, 1953 (Wednesday) ==
- The Ecuadorian naval yacht Esmereldas ran aground in the Guayas River; the vessel was a total loss.
- Rumely v. United States: The U.S. Supreme Court ruled that indirect lobbying in the United States by distribution of books intended to influence opinion was a public good and not subject to regulation by Congress.

== September 10, 1953 (Thursday) ==
- The 1953 Tour de Hongrie cycle race concluded in Budapest and was won by József Kis-Dala of Hungary.

== September 11, 1953 (Friday) ==
- American soprano Helen Traubel began performing in cabaret at Chicago nightclub Chez Paree. Later in the month she would leave the Metropolitan Opera, following an ultimatum from the manager of the Met, Rudolf Bing.

== September 12, 1953 (Saturday) ==
- U.S. Senator John Fitzgerald Kennedy married Jacqueline Lee Bouvier at St. Mary's Church in Newport, Rhode Island.

== September 13, 1953 (Sunday) ==
- The 1953 World Championship of Drivers ended with the Italian Grand Prix at Monza. The race was won by Juan Manuel Fangio of Argentina, but Alberto Ascari of Italy retained the championship.
- Bob Trice became the first black player to play baseball for the Philadelphia Athletics team in the United States.

== September 16, 1953 (Wednesday) ==
- The Biblical epic film The Robe was released in the United States. It was the first film to be released in CinemaScope, a new widescreen format.
- American Airlines Flight 723, a Convair CV-240-0, attempting to land in fog at Albany Airport, hit radio masts and crashed, killing all 28 people on board.

== September 17, 1953 (Thursday) ==
- US Navy Test pilot Scott Crossfield reached Mach 1.85 at an altitude of 74,000 feet (22,555 m) in a Douglas Skyrocket.
- Ernie Banks was introduced as the first African-American to play for the Chicago Cubs baseball team in the United States.

== September 18, 1953 (Friday) ==
- Died: Charles de Tornaco, 26, Belgian racing driver, in an accident during practice for the Modena Grand Prix

== September 19, 1953 (Saturday) ==
- Born: Wayne Clark, Australian Test cricketer, in Perth

== September 20, 1953 (Sunday) ==
- Argentinian driver Juan Manuel Fangio won the 1953 Modena Grand Prix.
- In the United States, the Chicago Aurora and Elgin Railroad ceased to operate into Chicago, the service now terminating at the Forest Park terminal.

== September 21, 1953 (Monday) ==
- A North Korean pilot, No Kum-Sok, defected to South Korea. He received a reward that had been offered by the U.S. Far East Command for delivery of an intact MiG-15 fighter plane.
- The Liberian-registered cargo ship Greenville sank in the Atlantic Ocean; one crew member was lost, and the other 25 people on board were rescued by the French ship Île de France.

== September 22, 1953 (Tuesday) ==
- In the Danish general election, the Social Democratic Party retained 74 of the 179 seats, remaining the largest in the Folketing.
- The Japanese tanker Eiho Maru ran aground three times in the River Mersey, United Kingdom.
- Born: Ségolène Royal, French politician and presidential candidate, at the military base of Ouakam, Dakar, French West Africa (Senegal)

== September 23, 1953 (Wednesday) ==
- Francoist Spain and the United States of America signed the Pact of Madrid, ending a period of virtual isolation for Spain.

== September 24, 1953 (Thursday) ==
- US boxer Rocky Marciano retained his World Heavyweight title by defeating another American, Roland La Starza, when their New York City bout was stopped in the 11th round.
- Died: Jacobo Fitz-James Stuart, 17th Duke of Alba, 74, Spanish aristocrat, diplomat, politician, art collector and Olympic sportsman

== September 25, 1953 (Friday) ==
- Typhoon Tess made landfall in Japan and killed at least 393 people.
- Primate of Poland Stefan Wyszyński, imprisoned by the Communist government, was placed under house arrest in Rywałd.

== September 26, 1953 (Saturday) ==
- Rationing of raw sugar ended in the UK.

== September 27, 1953 (Sunday) ==
- RecordTV was launched in Brazil. A free-to-air television network, it became the first official regular broadcasting service in São Paulo.

== September 28, 1953 (Monday) ==
- Resort Airlines Flight 1081, a Curtiss C-46F-1-CU Commando (registration N66534) – crashed on approach to Standiford Field in Louisville, Kentucky, United States. The crash and resultant fire killed 25 of the 41 people on board.
- Died: Edwin Hubble, 63, US astronomer, of cerebral thrombosis

== September 29, 1953 (Tuesday) ==
- The British Royal Navy destroyer HMS Tyrian ran aground in the North Sea off Cromer, Norfolk, England, but was later refloated.
- Died: Ernst Reuter, 64, German politician and incumbent Mayor of West Berlin, of a heart attack. US President Dwight D. Eisenhower referred to him as "a rare combination of talents".

== September 30, 1953 (Wednesday) ==
- Social Democrat leader Hans Hedtoft replaced Erik Eriksen as Prime Minister of Denmark.
- The US fishing vessel Sortland was destroyed by fire at Driftwood Bay on the coast of the Kenai Peninsula in the Territory of Alaska.
- The decommissioned US Navy frigate USS Rockford was sunk as a torpedo target.
