= July 1953 =

Month of 1953

<<	July 1953					>>
Su	Mo	Tu	We	Th	Fr	Sa
			1	2	3	4
5	6	7	8	9	10	11
12	13	14	15	16	17	18
19	20	21	22	23	24	25
26	27	28	29	30	31

The following events occurred in July 1953:

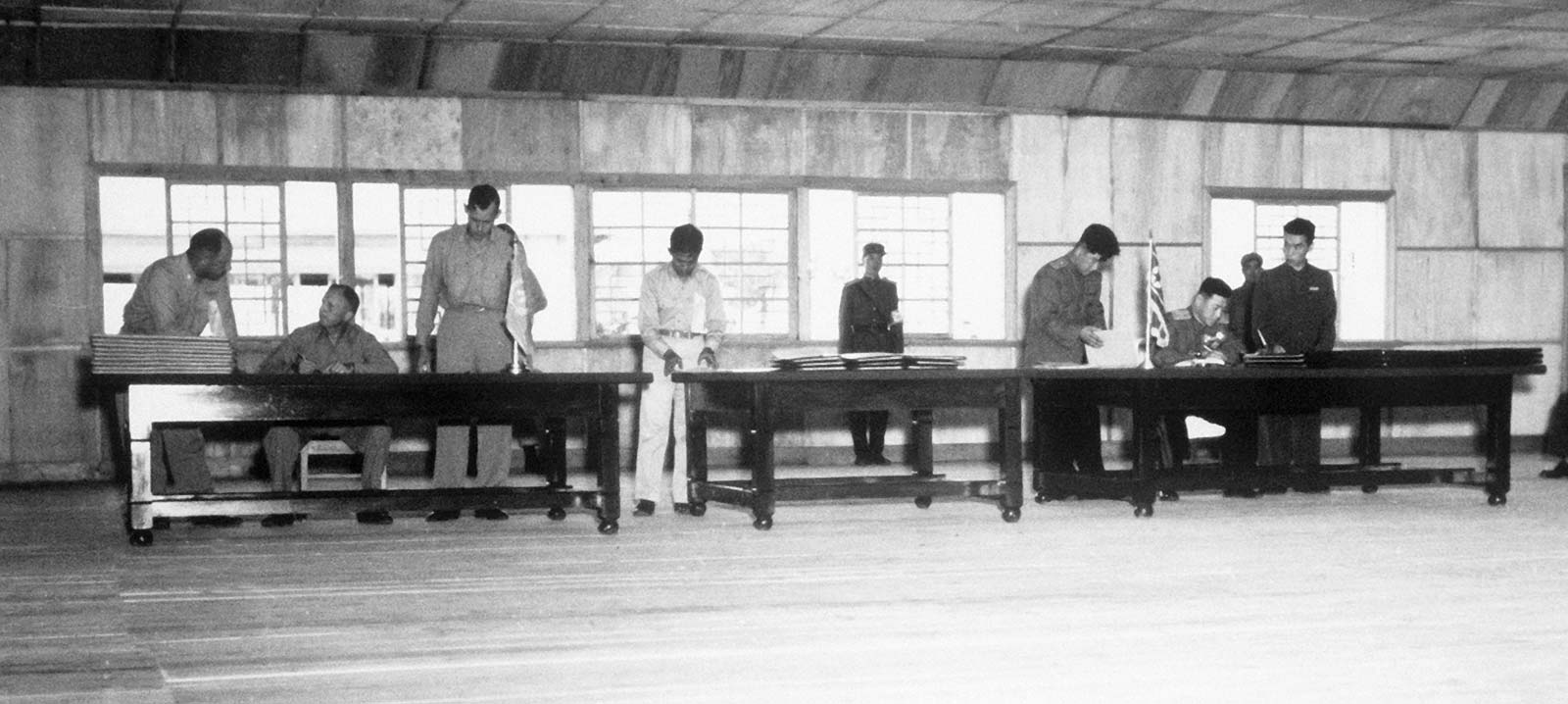
July 27: The Korean War comes to an end with an armistice agreement signed by North and South Korea

== July 1, 1953 (Wednesday) ==
- 20th Century Fox released Howard Hawks's musical film Gentlemen Prefer Blondes, starring Marilyn Monroe and Jane Russell.

== July 2, 1953 (Thursday) ==
- In the UK, in the Birmingham Edgbaston by-election, brought about by the elevation of Conservative MP, Peter Bennett, to the peerage, Edith Pitt retained the seat for the Conservatives.

== July 3, 1953 (Friday) ==
- The first ascent of Nanga Parbat in the Pakistan Himalayas, the world's ninth highest mountain, was made by Austrian climber Hermann Buhl alone on a German–Austrian expedition.

== July 4, 1953 (Saturday) ==
- On the final day of the Wimbledon Tennis Championships in London, UK, Vic Seixas of the United States defeated Danish player Kurt Nielsen to win the Men's singles competition.
- Japanese Crown Prince Akhito arrived in Rome for an official visit; he met the Italian president Luigi Einaudi at the Quirinal Palace, and (July 6) Pope Pius XII in Vatican.

== July 5, 1953 (Sunday) ==
- The Vasil Levski National Stadium opened in Sofia, Bulgaria.
- In the Reims-Gueux circuit, in what was known as the "race of the century", Mike Hawthorn, on Ferrari, won the 1953 French Gran Prix after a thrilling duel with Juan Manuel Fangio, on Maserati.
- Died: Titta Ruffo, 77, Italian baritone

== July 6, 1953 (Monday) ==
- For the first time, an airplane traveled the London-Paris route in less than twenty minutes. Lieutenant Mike Lithgow, in a Supermarine Swift F 4, flew from Heathrow to Le Bourget in 19 minutes and 18 seconds.
- Born: Nanci Griffith, American singer-songwriter, in Seguin, Texas (died 2021)

== July 7, 1953 (Tuesday) ==
- 1953 Menzengraben mining accident: Three people were killed as a result of an explosion in a potash mine in Menzengraben, East Germany.
- Walter Burkemo won the 1953 PGA Championship golf tournament in Birmingham, Alabama, United States.
- In Korea, after a pause in combat due to bad weather, Chinese troops launched a night attack against Pork Chop Hill and an offensive against the Berlin Outposts and Boulder City.
- Died: Harry Eyre, novice speedway rider, of injuries sustained in a crash at West Ham Stadium during the 1953 Speedway National League season.

== July 8, 1953 (Wednesday) ==
- US local TV channel Nevada TV, KLAS-TV, broadcast for the first time on channel 8 at 7pm.
- Strikes and demonstrations took place throughout East Germany, demanding the release of the workers arrested during the Berlin uprising. The Soviet Union responded by sending an armored division to the strategic points in East Berlin.

== July 9, 1953 (Thursday) ==
- The US Treasury formally renamed the Bureau of Internal Revenue; the new name (which had previously been used informally) was the Internal Revenue Service.
- Arsonist Stanford Pattan started the Rattlesnake Fire in the Mendocino National Forest in northern California. The fire would kill one United States Forest Service employee and 14 volunteer firefighters before being controlled on July 11.
- Syngman Rhee agreed to join the armistice with North Korea, after General Mark W. Clark, commander in chief of the UN command, threatened to sign the truce even without his consent.
- The circulation between East and West Berlin that was suspended after the June uprising was reopened.
- A storm devastated Val Camonica and the shores of Lake Iseo. There were 16 victims (11 in the small town of Pisogne).
- Died: Annie Kenney, 73, British working-class suffragette

== July 10, 1953 (Friday) ==
- The Soviet official newspaper Pravda announced that Lavrentiy Beria had been deposed as head of the MVD and Minister of the Interiors, expelled from the Communist Party and arrested for high treason. Sergej Kruglov replaced him as Minister of the Interiors.
- In Washington, tripartite meetings of the American (John Foster Dulles), French (Georges Bidault) and English (Lord Salisbury, replacing Anthony Eden due to illness) Foreign Ministers. Dulles' rigidly anti-communist positions were opposed to those of the two Europeans, in favour of détente with the USSR. On July 11, the three ministers were received by U.S. President Dwight D. Eisenhower.

== July 11, 1953 (Saturday) ==
- A solar eclipse was visible.
- In France, Pierre Bertaux, director of the National Police, was suspended from his duties because of his relations with Corsican gangster Paul Leca, author of the Begum’s jewel robbery. During the trial for the theft, Georges Valentin, director of the Judicial Police, accused his colleague of aiding and abetting; Berteaux denied the accusations, but admitted his friendship with Leca, known during the Resistance.
- General Maxwell Taylor left Pork Chop Hill to the Chinese troops; it was the last communist victory in the Korean War.
- Born: Leon Spinks, American boxer, in St. Louis (died 2021)

== July 12, 1953 (Sunday) ==
- Voting began in the Lebanese general election, continuing until August 9.
- Died: Herbert Rawlinson, 67, English actor

== July 13, 1953 (Monday) ==
- India introduced the Modified Scheme of Elementary education 1953 in Madras State. The scheme, promoted by C. Rajagopalachari (Rajaji), would be dropped by his successor the following year.

== July 14, 1953 (Tuesday) ==
- 14 July 1953 demonstration: In Paris, France, police opened fire on protesters from the Algerian anti-colonial Movement for the Triumph of Democratic Liberties, resulting in seven deaths.

== July 15, 1953 (Wednesday) ==
- The Welfare Ordinance 1953 was passed in Australia's Northern Territory, under which the Director of Native Affairs was replaced by a Director of Welfare, who exerted control over the lives of Aboriginal people.
- China First Automobile Work, present-day FAW Group, a truck, bus and automobile product and sales company in China, was founded in Changchun.

== July 16, 1953 (Thursday) ==
- In Italy, the De Gasperi VIII Cabinet began its 32-day period in office, one of the shortest in the country's political history.
- Norway's Parliament voted to move the country's main naval base from Horten to a new base in Bergen.
- Second Battle of Dongshan Island: Three landing ships belonging to the Republic of China's navy were sunk in a harbour on the coast of Dongshan Island by mortar fire, which detonated their cargoes of ammunition.
- Died: Hilaire Belloc, 82, French-born British writer and historian

== July 17, 1953 (Friday) ==
- USMC R4Q NROTC crash: The greatest recorded loss of United States midshipmen in a single event resulted from an aircraft crash near NAS Whiting Field, killing 43, including 38 midshipmen.
- The second Miss Universe pageant was held in Long Beach, California, United States, and was won by the French contestant, Christiane Martel.
- Died: Maude Adams, 80, American actress

== July 19, 1953 (Sunday) ==
- In the final of the Ulster Senior Gaelic Football Championship, Armagh defeated Cavan at Casement Park, Belfast, to go through to the 1953 All-Ireland Senior Football Championship semi-final.
- Born:
  - Shōichi Nakagawa, Japanese politician, in Tokyo (died 2009)
  - Howard Schultz, American businessman, former CEO of Starbucks, in Brooklyn, New York

== July 20, 1953 (Monday) ==
- Died: Dumarsais Estimé, 53, President of Haiti, at Columbia Presbyterian Hospital in New York City

== July 21, 1953 (Tuesday) ==
- The 1953 World Archery Championships opened in Oslo, Norway, running until July 25.
- Born: Jeff Fatt, Australian musician and actor, co-founder of The Wiggles, in Casino, New South Wales

== July 22, 1953 (Wednesday) ==
- Born: Paul Quarrington, Canadian novelist, playwright, screenwriter, filmmaker, musician and teacher, in Toronto (died 2010)

== July 23, 1953 (Thursday) ==
- The US tanker vessel Pan Georgia exploded and was burnt out at Wilmington, Delaware. It would later be converted for use as a dredger.
- Born: Najib Razak, Prime Minister of Malaysia from 2009 to 2018, in Kuala Lipis, Pahang, Federation of Malaya

== July 24, 1953 (Friday) ==
- Born: Tadashi Kawamata, Japanese artist, in Mikasa, Hokkaido

== July 25, 1953 (Saturday) ==
- The 1953 World Archery Championships concluded in Oslo, Norway. Sweden won the men's team event and Finland the women's.

== July 26, 1953 (Sunday) ==
- Fidel Castro and his brother led a disastrous assault on the Moncada Barracks, preliminary to the Cuban Revolution.
- Louison Bobet won the 1953 Tour de France.
- The Esposizione internazionale dell'agricoltura di Roma opened in Rome, Italy, running until October 31.
- The 1953 Pan Arab Games opened in Alexandria, Egypt, running until 10 August.
- The Short Creek raid was carried out on a polygynous Mormon sect in Arizona, United States. It is thought to have been "the largest mass arrest of men and women in modern American history."
- The Spanish ship Duero collided with the British ship Culrain in the Strait of Gibraltar and sank. All 28 crew members were saved.
- In the Munster final of the 1953 All-Ireland Senior Hurling Championship, Cork GAA defeated Tipperary GAA, with the highest points total (21) scored in a match during the competition.
- A total lunar eclipse was visible from Australia, East Asia, and North and South America.

== July 27, 1953 (Monday) ==
- The Korean War ended with the Korean Armistice Agreement: United Nations Command (Korea) (United States), People's Republic of China, and North Korea signed an armistice agreement at Panmunjom. The north remained communist while the south remained capitalist.

== July 29, 1953 (Wednesday) ==
- Born:
  - Ken Burns, American documentary filmmaker, in Brooklyn
  - Tim Gunn, American academic, reality television personality (Project Runway), and author, in Washington, D.C.
- Died: Richard William Pearse, 75, New Zealand aviation pioneer

== July 30, 1953 (Thursday) ==
- Preliminary studies were completed by C. E. Brown, W. J. O'Sullivan Jr., and C. H. Zimmerman at the Langley Aeronautical Laboratory relative to the study of the problems of human spaceflight and a suggested test vehicle to investigate these problems. One of the possibilities considered from the outset of the effort in mid-1952 was modification of the Bell X-2 airplane to attain greater speeds and altitudes of the order of 200,000 feet (61,000 m). It was believed that such a vehicle could not only resolve some of the aerodynamic heating problems, but also that the altitude objective would provide an environment with a minimum atmospheric density, representing many problems of outer space flight. However, there was already a feeling among many NACA scientists that the speed and altitude exploratory area should be raised. In fact, a resolution to this effect, presented as early as July 1952, stated that ". . . the NACA devote . . . effort to problems of unmanned and manned flights at altitudes from 50 miles to infinity and at speeds from mach 10 to the velocity of escape from the earth's gravity." The executive committee of NACA actually adopted this resolution as an objective on July 14, 1952.

== July 31, 1953 (Friday) ==
- Died: Robert A. Taft, 63, American politician, United States Senate Majority Leader, of pancreatic cancer
