= April 1953 =

Month of 1953

<<	April 1953					>>
Su	Mo	Tu	We	Th	Fr	Sa
			1	2	3	4
5	6	7	8	9	10	11
12	13	14	15	16	17	18
19	20	21	22	23	24	25
26	27	28	29	30

The following events occurred in April 1953:

== April 1, 1953 (Wednesday) ==
- The 252nd Communications Group was created as a unit of the Washington Air National Guard at Camp Murray in the United States. Today, the unit is known as 252nd Cyberspace Operations Group after a number of redesignations.

== April 3, 1953 (Friday) ==
- The first issue of the American television magazine, TV Guide, was published.

== April 4, 1953 (Saturday) ==
- Died: Former King Carol II of Romania, 59, in exile in Portugal. His remains were eventually returned to Romania and finally interred in the Curtea de Argeș Cathedral in 2019.

== April 5, 1953 (Sunday) ==
- The 1953 Tour of Flanders cycle race was won by Wim van Est, ending in a two-man sprint finish with Désiré Keteleer at Wetteren.

== April 7, 1953 (Tuesday) ==
- In the primary election for Mayor of the US city of Los Angeles, Republican Norris Poulson gained 44% of the vote, with the incumbent, Fletcher Bowron, also a Republican, winning only 37.13%, after a number of unsuccessful recall attempts. A run-off between the two had to be held the following month.
- Dag Hammarskjöld was elected United Nations Secretary-General.
- A new Royal Titles Act was passed, amending the title used by Queen Elizabeth II of the United Kingdom in Ceylon (now Sri Lanka).

== April 8, 1953 (Wednesday) ==
- Kapenguria Six: Jomo Kenyatta was sentenced to seven years in prison for the alleged organization of the Mau Mau Uprising.

== April 9, 1953 (Thursday) ==
- A referendum on the formation of the Federation of Rhodesia and Nyasaland, held in Southern Rhodesia, resulted in the proposal being approved by 63.45% of voters.
- Born: Stephen Paddock, American mass murderer, in Clinton, Iowa (d. 2017)
- Died: Stanisław Wojciechowski, 84, President of Poland 1922-26

== April 10, 1953 (Friday) ==
- The Australian professional soccer club, the Melbourne Knights, was founded as Croatia SC in Melbourne.

== April 11, 1953 (Saturday) ==
- Born: Guy Verhofstadt, Prime Minister of Belgium 1999-2008, in Dendermonde
- Born: Andrew Wiles, English mathematician specialising in number theory, born in Cambridge, England, best known for proving Fermat's Last Theorem

== April 12, 1953 (Sunday) ==
- The 51st Paris–Roubaix cycle race was held in France and was won by Germain Derycke of Belgium.
- Born: Niklas Rådström, Swedish poet, novelist and dramatist, in Stockholm

== April 13, 1953 (Monday) ==
- Ian Fleming's first James Bond novel, Casino Royale, was published in the United Kingdom.
- The German football team SG Dynamo Dresden was founded.
- A new radio series, Partners in Crime, based on the works of Agatha Christie and starring Richard Attenborough and Sheila Sim, was launched on the BBC Home Service in the UK.

== April 14, 1953 (Tuesday) ==
- The Flags Act 1953, defining the official Australian National Flag and Australian Red Ensign, came into force.

== April 15, 1953 (Wednesday) ==
- The South African general election strengthened the position of the ruling National Party, led by D. F. Malan, which won an overall majority.
- At the opening of the 1953 Cannes Film Festival in France, US film producer Walt Disney received an award from the French government.
- The North Down by-election in Northern Ireland, brought about by the death of the sitting Ulster Unionist Party MP, Walter Smiles, in the sinking of the MV Princess Victoria during North Sea storms earlier in the year, resulted in the unopposed election of another UUP candidate, Smiles' daughter Patricia Ford, who thus became the first woman to be elected to a Northern Ireland constituency.
- A new television channel, WEEU-TV, began broadcasting in the US state of Pennsylvania. It would go out of business after less than two years.
- April 15th, 1953 was the last time an American ground troop was killed by ordnance delivered from an enemy aircraft.

== April 16, 1953 (Thursday) ==
- US President Eisenhower delivered his "Chance for Peace" speech to the National Association of Newspaper Editors.
- A four-story building in Chicago, United States, belonging to the Haber Corporation, caught fire, killing 35 employees.
- The 1953 Úrvalsdeild karla basketball competition in Iceland was won by ÍKF, for the second time.

== April 17, 1953 (Friday) ==
- US baseball player Mickey Mantle hit a 565-foot (172 m) home run at Griffith Stadium in Washington, D.C. Mantle's home run is believed to be the longest home run in baseball history by historians of the sport.
- The 1953 German–Austrian Nanga Parbat expedition team leaves Munich.

== April 18, 1953 (Saturday) ==
- The 2nd Aston Martin Owners Club Formula 2 Race took place at Snetterton Circuit, Norfolk, UK, and was won by British driver Eric Thompson.
- Born: Rick Moranis, Canadian comedy actor, in Toronto, Ontario

== April 19, 1953 (Sunday) ==
- The Japanese general election resulted in a win for the ruling Liberal Party, but without an overall majority.

== April 20, 1953 (Monday) ==
- US singer Frank Sinatra and arranger Nelson Riddle began their first recording sessions together at Capitol Records, which would result in some of the defining recordings of Sinatra's career.
- US jazz trumpeter Miles Davis, at the height of his heroin addiction, recorded his album Miles Davis Volume 2 at WOR Studios, New York City.

== April 21, 1953 (Tuesday) ==
- Denmark held elections to the Folketing and Landsting. The Social Democratic Party remained the largest in the Folketing, with 61 of the 151 seats.
- The Battle of Chatkol, part of the Korean War, ended after the Belgian Volunteer Corps for Korea held its position for 55 consecutive nights.

== April 24, 1953 (Friday) ==
- The House of Councillors election in Japan affected half the seats in the House. The Yoshida faction of the Liberal Party were the biggest winners.
- Acting Prime Minister of South Korea, Paik Too-chin, was confirmed in office by the country's National Assembly.
- The seventh annual draft of the NBA was held to select amateur U.S. college basketball players.
- Winston Churchill was knighted by Queen Elizabeth II

== April 25, 1953 (Saturday) ==
- Francis Crick and James Watson published "Molecular Structure of Nucleic Acids: A Structure for Deoxyribose Nucleic Acid", their description of the double helix structure of DNA.

== April 27, 1953 (Monday) ==
- Died: Maud Gonne, 86, English-born Irish republican revolutionary, memoirist; former wife of John MacBride

== April 28, 1953 (Tuesday) ==
- A tornado outbreak began southwest of Greensburg, Kansas, going on to affect a large area of the Southeastern United States.
- Born: Roberto Bolaño, Chilean author (d. 2003)

== April 29, 1953 (Wednesday) ==
- Died: Alice Prin (Kiki de Montparnasse), 51, French artists' model, after collapsing outside her flat in Paris, suffering from complications of alcoholism or drug dependence.
