= October 1953 =

Month of 1953

<<	October 1953					>>
Su	Mo	Tu	We	Th	Fr	Sa
				1	2	3
4	5	6	7	8	9	10
11	12	13	14	15	16	17
18	19	20	21	22	23	24
25	26	27	28	29	30	31

The following events occurred in October 1953:

== October 1, 1953 (Thursday) ==
- The Andhra State Act was passed in India, creating Andhra State from Telugu-speaking areas of the state of Madras. Sir Chandulal Madhavlal Trivedi was appointed governor of the new state.
- The United States and South Korea signed a mutual defense treaty in Washington, D.C.
- KJEO TV channel 47 in Fresno, CA (CBS/ABC) began broadcasting.
- KYTV TV channel 3 in Springfield, MO (NBC) began broadcasting.
- WATE TV channel 6 in Knoxville, TN (ABC/NBC) began broadcasting.
- WREX TV channel 13 in Rockford, IL (ABC) began broadcasting.
- Born: Grete Waitz, Norwegian Olympic marathon runner, in Oslo, as Grete Andersen (died 2011)

== October 2, 1953 (Friday) ==
- Died: John Marin, 82, US modernist artist

== October 3, 1953 (Saturday) ==
- The 1953 Ryder Cup golf tournament, held at Wentworth Club in Virginia Water, Surrey, UK, ended in a sixth consecutive victory for the United States.
- KGGM TV channel 13 in Albuquerque, NM (CBS) began broadcasting.
- Born: Karen Bass, American politician, Mayor of Los Angeles, in Los Angeles
- Died:
  - Sir Arnold Bax, 69, English composer and writer, Master of the Queen's Music, of heart failure
  - Rosario Candela, 63, Italian-American architect

== October 4, 1953 (Sunday) ==
- Born:
  - Tchéky Karyo, French actor and musician, in Istanbul, Turkey, under the name Baruch Djaki Karyo
  - Andreas Vollenweider, Swiss harpist, in Zürich

== October 5, 1953 (Monday) ==
- U.S. President Dwight D. Eisenhower appointed Earl Warren Chief Justice of the United States.
- Wilhelm Furtwängler made a public protest, jointly with the soloists in the Vienna State Opera's production of Don Giovanni, against the suspension of Egon Hilbert as director of the State Opera.
- The first meeting of Narcotics Anonymous was held (the first planning session was held August 17).

== October 6, 1953 (Tuesday) ==
- UNICEF, the United Nations Children's Fund, was made a permanent specialized agency of the United Nations.
- The UK government sent troops to deal with unrest in the colony of British Guiana; Communists were blamed.
- Died: Vera Mukhina, 64, Soviet sculptor and painter, of angina

== October 7, 1953 (Wednesday) ==
- Died: Emil Filla, 71, Moravian avant-garde painter, Buchenwald survivor

== October 8, 1953 (Thursday) ==
- Died: Kathleen Ferrier, 41, English contralto singer, of breast cancer

== October 9, 1953 (Friday) ==
- After the 1953 West German federal election, Konrad Adenauer was re-elected as Chancellor of Germany.
- The British Guiana constitution was suspended.
- In a papal address, Pope Pius XII delivered "The Technician", a document instructing scientists to restrict themselves to the study of physical matter and do nothing to undermine the idea of a non-material soul or a Superior Being.
- Born: Tony Shalhoub, American actor, in Green Bay, Wisconsin

== October 10, 1953 (Saturday) ==
- British pilot Monty Burton won the 1953 London to Christchurch air race (held to celebrate the centenary of the city of Christchurch, New Zealand) in under 23 hours flying time.
- In the final of the 1953 Soviet Cup football tournament, FC Dynamo Moscow defeated Zenit Kuibyshev.
- The Mutual Defense Treaty Between the United States and the Republic of Korea was concluded in Washington, D.C.
- Born: Midge Ure, Scottish singer-songwriter, in Cambuslang, as James Ure

== October 11, 1953 (Sunday) ==
- Born: David Morse, American actor, in Beverly, Massachusetts
- Died: Pauline Robinson Bush, 3, daughter of future US President George H. W. Bush and his wife Barbara, from leukemia.

== October 12, 1953 (Monday) ==
- In the Norwegian parliamentary election, the Labour Party won 77 of the 150 seats in the Storting.
- Primate of Poland Stefan Wyszyński, imprisoned by the Communist government, was relocated from Rywałd to Stoczek Klasztorny.
- Three ministers from the Malta Workers Party resigned from Giorgio Borġ Olivier's coalition government following a defeat in the Legislative Assembly on a budget motion. This led to the dissolution of Parliament and a general election.
- The 29th FA Charity Shield football match was played at Highbury Stadium, London, UK, and was won by Arsenal F.C. over Blackpool F.C.
- The British cargo ship Beckenham ran aground and broke in two in the Kara Sea, Soviet Union. The crew members were rescued by a Soviet ship.
- Born: Les Dennis, British comedian and television presenter, in Liverpool, England

== October 13, 1953 (Tuesday) ==
- Herman Wouk's play The Caine Mutiny Court-Martial, adapted from his own novel, premièred at the Granada Theatre in Santa Barbara, California, United States.
- United States Air Force test pilot Maj. Raymond Popson died in the crash of a Bell X-5 variable-sweep wing aircraft at Edwards Air Force Base when the plane failed to recover from a spin at 60° sweepback.

== October 14, 1953 (Wednesday) ==
- Qibya massacre: Israeli forces massacred 69 Palestinian civilians.
- A Convair CV-240 operated by Sabena crashed shortly after take-off from Frankfurt International Airport in West Germany, on a flight to Brussels, Belgium, killing all 44 people on board.
- The Canadian city of Edmonton held a municipal election to elect six aldermen.

== October 15, 1953 (Thursday) ==
- Born:
  - Larry Miller, American comedian
  - Tito Jackson, American singer and member of the Jackson 5 (d. 2024)

== October 16, 1953 (Friday) ==
- Cuban revolutionary and future leader Fidel Castro delivered one of his most famous speeches, "History Will Absolve Me", and was sentenced to 15 years' imprisonment by the existing government for leading an attack on the Moncada Barracks.

== October 18, 1953 (Sunday) ==
- Peter Brook's live television production of Shakespeare's King Lear, starring Orson Welles as Lear, was broadcast in the United States as part of the CBS television series Omnibus, hosted by Alistair Cooke.
- Born: Georgi Raykov, Bulgarian Olympic wrestler, in Sofia (d. 2006)

== October 19, 1953 (Monday) ==
- During a domestic flight from Aeropuerto del Norte outside Monterrey to the Nueva Ciudad Guerrero airstrip, carrying guests to the inauguration of the Falcon Dam, a Pemex Douglas DC-3 crashed into a ravine near Mamulique, Mexico, killing all 15 people on board.
- The La Rosa Incident: Arthur Godfrey, one of America's top media personalities, fired singer Julius La Rosa on the air, an event that drew considerable attention, caused some shock and resulted in significant criticism of Godfrey. The incident quickly altered public perception of Godfrey, materially damaging his career.
- The Miss World 1953 competition was held in London, UK, and was won by Denise Perrier, Miss France.
- Ray Bradbury's Fahrenheit 451 is published by Ballantine Books.

== October 20, 1953 (Tuesday) ==
- German Chancellor Konrad Adenauer's second cabinet was sworn in.
- Born : Bill Nunn, American actor (died on September 24th, 2016)

== October 21, 1953 (Wednesday) ==
- British actor Sir John Gielgud was fined for "persistently importuning male persons for an immoral purpose" (cottaging) in Chelsea, London.

== October 22, 1953 (Thursday) ==
- Under the Treaty of Amity and Association, France recognised the independence of the Kingdom of Laos.
- In the Northern Ireland general election, the Ulster Unionist Party won a large majority. Basil Brooke continued as Prime Minister.
- The Japanese tanker Eiho Maru ran aground three times within 24 hours, in the River Mersey, United Kingdom.

== October 23, 1953 (Friday) ==
- Alto Broadcasting System in the Philippines made the first television broadcast in southeast Asia through DZAQ-TV. Alto Broadcasting System (ABS) was the predecessor of what would later become ABS-CBN Corporation after being bought by the Chronicle Broadcasting Network (CBN) in 1957.
- The RFA Eddyreef coastal tanker entered service with the UK's Royal Fleet Auxiliary.

== October 24, 1953 (Saturday) ==
- In the 1953 Scottish League Cup Final, held in Glasgow, East Fife F.C. defeated Partick Thistle F.C. 3–2.

== October 25, 1953 (Sunday) ==
- The US-registered fishing vessel Sea Gram was destroyed by fire at Saltery Bay in the Tenakee Inlet in Southeast Alaska.

== October 26, 1953 (Monday) ==
- Passenger service ended on the Pacific Electric Santa Monica Air Line in the United States.

== October 27, 1953 (Tuesday) ==
- The life-boat Robert Lindsay, based in Arbroath, Scotland, capsized after being hit by a huge wave and flung onto rocks at Inchcape Park. Six crew members were killed.
- Egon Hilbert resigned from his position as director of the Vienna State Opera.

== October 28, 1953 (Wednesday) ==
- U.S. sports commentator Red Barber left the Brooklyn Dodgers baseball team to join the New York Yankees.

== October 29, 1953 (Thursday) ==
- U.S. Air Force pilot Frank K. "Speedy Pete" Everest set a new world speed record of 755.149 mph (1,216.021 km/h) in a North American YF-100A Super Sabre, while stationed at Edwards Air Force Base, California.
- BCPA Flight 304, operated by British Commonwealth Pacific Airlines, crashed while on initial approach to San Francisco International Airport in San Mateo County, California, United States, killing all 19 people on board.
- Born: Batton Lash, American comics creator, as Vito Marangi in Brooklyn, New York City (d. 2019)
- Died: William Kapell, 31, US pianist, a passenger in the fatal crash of BCPA Flight 304

== October 30, 1953 (Friday) ==
- Cold War: U.S. President Dwight D. Eisenhower formally approved a top-secret document of the United States National Security Council, NSC 162/2, which stated that the United States' arsenal of nuclear weapons must be maintained and expanded to counter the Communist threat (→ New Look).
- Born: Charles Martin Smith, American actor, director and film writer, in Van Nuys, California
- Died: Alice Eastwood, 94, Canadian botanist

== October 31, 1953 (Saturday) ==
- In the 1953 Kahibah state by-election in the Australian state of New South Wales, brought about by the forced resignation of Labor MLA Joshua Arthur, independent candidate Tom Armstrong won the seat.
- In the 1953 Waverley state by-election in the Australian state of New South Wales, brought about by the death of Labor MLA Clarrie Martin, William Ferguson retained the seat for Labor.
