= Egon Hilbert =

Austrian opera and theatre director (1899–1968)

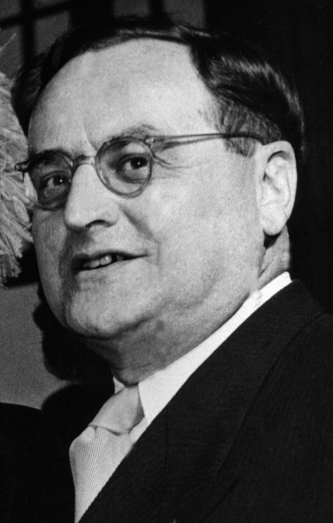
Egon Hilbert (1899–1968) 1951 OeNB 655602

Egon Hilbert (19 May 1899 – 18 January 1968) was an Austrian opera and theatre director. Hilbert was born in Vienna, Austria where he would later study law and philosophy at the Universität Wien.

In 1938, he was arrested by the Nazis and interned at Dachau concentration camp. In 1945, he was made provisional director of the Salzburger Landestheaters and attempted a reorganisation of the Salzburg Festival. From 1946 to 1953, he was head of the Austrian national theater administration. In 1953, after a brief suspension, he resigned as director of the Vienna State Opera. From 1954 to 1959 he was he was chief of the Austrian cultural institute in Rome. From 1959, he was general director of the Vienna Festival, and from 1963 until his death, he was the director of the Vienna State Opera.

== Honors and awards ==
- Officer of the Académie française
- Goldene Ehrenmedaille der Stadt Wien
