= MV Akademik Karpinsky =

1936 cargo ship in Germany

History
- Name: Thalia (1936–1945); Empire Consett (1945–1946); Akademik Karpinsky (1946–1953)
- Owner: Dampfschiffahrts-Gesellschaft Neptun (1936–1939); Kriegsmarine (1939–1945); Ministry of War Transport (1945); Ministry of Transport (1945–1946); Soviet Government (1946–1953)
- Operator: Dampfschiffahrts-Gesellschaft Neptun (1936–1939); Kriegsmarine (1939–1945); Coast Lines Ltd (1945–1946); Soviet Government (1946–1953)
- Port of registry: (Nazi Germany) Bremen (1937–1939); (Nazi Germany) Kriegsmarine (1939–1945); (United Kingdom) London (1945–1946); Soviet Union (1946–1953)
- Builder: Nordseewerke
- Launched: 1936
- Out of service: 31 August 1953
- Identification: Code Letters DORT (1936–1945); Code Letters GSNQ (1945–1946); United Kingdom Official Number 180747 (1945–1946)
- Fate: Sank

General characteristics
- Type: Cargo ship
- Tonnage: 1,122 GRT; 587 NRT
- Length: 235 ft 0 in (71.63 m)
- Beam: 34 ft 7 in (10.54 m)
- Depth: 13 ft 1 in (3.99 m)
- Installed power: 4SCSA diesel engine
- Propulsion: Screw propeller

Akademik Karpinsky was a 1,122 GRT cargo ship that was built in 1936 as Thalia by Nordseewerke, Emden, Germany, for German owners. She was interned at Cádiz, Spain, in 1943, and surrendered to the Allies in May 1945. Thalia passed to the Ministry of War Transport (MoWT) and was renamed Empire Consett. In 1946, she was transferred to the Soviet Union and renamed Akademik Karpinsky, serving until 31 August 1953 when she foundered.

== Description ==
The ship was built by Nordseewerke, Emden. She was launched in 1936.

The ship was 235 feet 0 inches (71.63 m) long, with a beam of 34 feet 7 inches (10.54 m) and a depth of 13 feet 1 inch (3.99 m). The ship had a GRT of 1,122 and a NRT of 587.

The ship was propelled by a 4-stroke Single Cycle Single Acting diesel engine, which had 12 cylinders of 11 5/8 inches (30 cm) diameter by 16 9/16 inches (42.1 cm) stroke. The engines were built by Friedrich Krupp Germaniawerft AG, Kiel.

== History ==
Thalia was built for Dampfschiffahrts-Gesellschaft Neptun, Bremen. Her port of registry was Bremen and the Code Letters DORT were allocated. When war was declared in 1939, Thalia was at Seville, Spain. She was requisitioned by the Kriegsmarine, In 1943, Thalia was interned at Cádiz, Spain. She was surrendered to the United Kingdom in May 1945. In July 1945, Thalia and Lucy Easberger were escorted from Cádiz to Gibraltar by HMS Verity and HMS Crocus, arriving on 15 July.

Thalia was renamed Empire Consett. Her port of registry was changed to London. The Code Letters GSNQ and United Kingdom Official Number 180747 were allocated. Empire Consett was operated under the management of Coast Lines Ltd. It was not until 25 August 1945 that Empire Consett arrived at Falmouth due to problems with her engines on the voyage from Spain. She departed Falmouth under tow on 12 September bound for Cardiff.

In 1946, Empire Consett was allocated to the Soviet Union. She was renamed Akademik Karpinsky. She served until 31 August 1953, when she foundered whilst on a voyage from Kaliningrad to Amsterdam, Netherlands.

in July 2011, the wreck was re-discovered 20 miles north of the port of Władysławowo in Poland in 255 feet (78 meters) of water.
