= March 1953 =

Month of 1953

<<	March 1953					>>
Su	Mo	Tu	We	Th	Fr	Sa
1	2	3	4	5	6	7
8	9	10	11	12	13	14
15	16	17	18	19	20	21
22	23	24	25	26	27	28
29	30	31

March 5: Soviet leader Joseph Stalin died at age 74 after suffering a stroke 4 days earlier.

The following events occurred in March 1953:

== March 1, 1953 (Sunday) ==
- Joseph Stalin suffered a stroke after an all-night dinner with Soviet Union interior minister Lavrentiy Beria and future premiers Georgi Malenkov, Nikolai Bulganin, and Nikita Khrushchev. The stroke paralyzed the right side of his body and rendered him unconscious until his death on March 5.
- Bernard Freyberg, 1st Baron Freyberg was made deputy constable and lieutenant governor of Windsor Castle.
- Born: M. K. Stalin a.k.a. Muthuvel Karunanidhi Stalin, Indian politician, 8th Chief Minister of Tamil Nadu. The name is not a coincidence; his father M. Karunanidhi a.k.a. M. Karunanidhi (Indian politician, 2nd Chief Minister of Tamil Nadu (though not in 1953) and writer) named him "Muthuvel Karunanidhi Stalin" after addressing a condolence meeting for Joseph Stalin's death on March 5. M. K. Stalin's son Udhayanidhi Stalin (Indian politician) also uses the "Stalin" name.

== March 2, 1953 (Monday) ==
- Born: Rodger Smitherman, American jurist, politician and member of the Alabama Senate since 1994.

== March 3, 1953 (Tuesday) ==
- During takeoff from Karachi Airport in Karachi, Pakistan, for a ferry/positioning flight, the pilot of the Canadian Pacific Air Lines De Havilland DH.106 Comet 1A Empress of Hawaii lifted the plane's nose too high to enable it to become airborne. The aircraft crashed into a dry riverbed, killing all 11 on board.
- Died: James J. Jeffries, American boxing champion (heart attack)

== March 5, 1953 (Thursday) ==
- Died:
  - Herman J. Mankiewicz, American writer and producer (b. 1897)
  - Sergei Prokofiev, Russian composer (b. 1891)
  - Joseph Stalin, Soviet leader (b. 1878)

== March 6, 1953 (Friday) ==
- Georgy Malenkov succeeded Joseph Stalin as Premier and First Secretary of the Communist Party of the Soviet Union.

== March 7, 1953 (Saturday) ==
- 1953 Queensland state election and 1953 South Australian state election: The Australian states of Queensland and South Australia held elections for the Queensland Legislative Assembly and South Australian House of Assembly. The result was an increased majority for the Labor Party in Queensland whilst the Liberal and Country League retained power in South Australia.
- Died: Edward Sedgwick, American director (b. 1892)

== March 8, 1953 (Sunday) ==
- Born: Jim Rice, American baseball player, in Anderson, South Carolina

== March 9, 1953 (Monday) ==
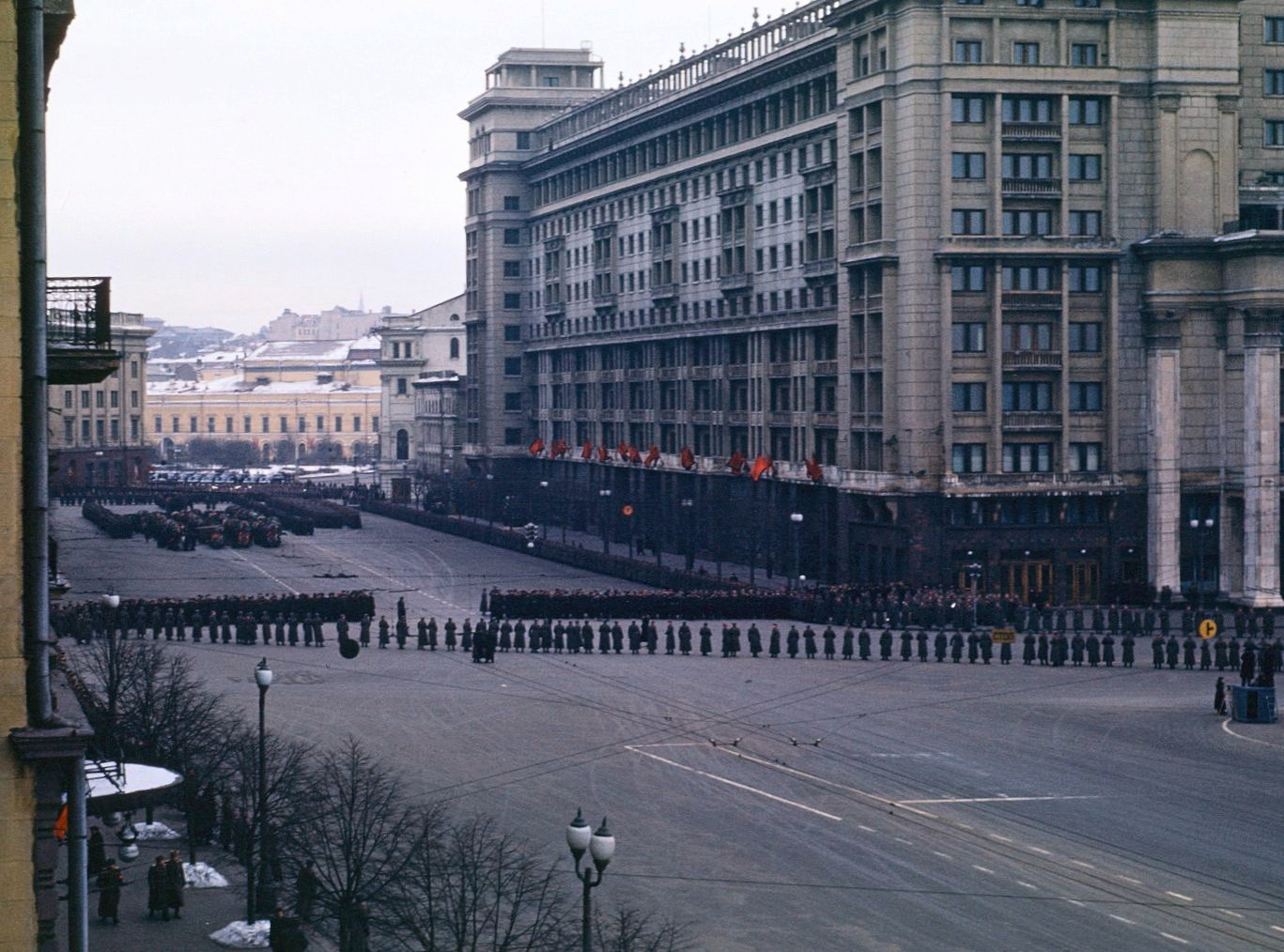
March 9, 1953: Funeral procession of Joseph Stalin in Moscow

- The state funeral of Jospeph Stalin was held in Moscow to mourn the loss of Soviet leader Stalin following his death 4 days earlier. It is estimated that more than 100 spectators were killed in crushes.

== March 10, 1953 (Tuesday) ==
- Born: Debbie Brill, Canadian athlete, in Mission, British Columbia

== March 12, 1953 (Thursday) ==
- A 3-day tornado outbreak began in parts of the United States. It would eventually cause at least 21 deaths and millions of dollars' worth of damage.

== March 13, 1953 (Friday) ==
- 1953 United Nations Secretary-General selection: In the first round of voting, all three candidates were rejected.
- Died: Johan Laidoner, Commander-in-chief of the Estonian Army (b. 1884)

== March 14, 1953 (Saturday) ==
- Nikita Khrushchev was selected First Secretary of the Soviet Communist Party.
- Died: Klement Gottwald, 56, 5th President of Czechoslovakia, already suffering from a variety of health problems, from the after-effects of a burst artery or from pneumonia contracted at Stalin's funeral.

== March 15, 1953 (Sunday) ==
- The 20th Ice Hockey World Championships ended in Switzerland, with Sweden winning for the first time. Canada and the Soviet Union did not compete. Czechoslovakia, originally due to play Sweden on the last day, had withdrawn the day before because of the death of the country's president.
- The 1953 Paris–Nice cycle race ended at Nice and was won by Jean-Pierre Munch.

== March 16, 1953 (Monday) ==
- Born: Isabelle Huppert, French actress, in Paris

== March 17, 1953 (Tuesday) ==
- An Aigle Azur Douglas C-47A Skytrain (registration F-BEFG) crashed on approach to Da Nang Airport in Da Nang, French Indochina. The plane caught fire, killing all eight occupants.
- The first nuclear test of Operation Upshot–Knothole was conducted in Nevada, United States, with 1,620 spectators at 3.4 km (2.1 mi).
- Born: Filemon Lagman ("Ka Popoy"), Filipino revolutionary, in Bicol (d. 2001)

== March 18, 1953 (Wednesday) ==
- An earthquake hit western Turkey, killing at least 1,070 people.
- The final of the 1953 NCAA basketball tournament for men was held in Kansas City, Missouri, United States, and was won by the Indiana Hoosiers.

== March 19, 1953 (Thursday) ==
- The 25th Academy Awards ceremony was held (the first one broadcast on television).
- The 44th Milan–San Remo cycle race was held in Italy and was won by Loretto Petrucci.

== March 20, 1953 (Friday) ==
- Died: Graciliano Ramos, Brazilian writer (b. 1892)

== March 22, 1953 (Sunday) ==
- Born: Esme Steyn, South African lawn bowler, in Durban

== March 23, 1953 (Monday) ==
- Died:
  - Raoul Dufy, French painter (b. 1875)
  - Oskar Luts, Estonian writer and playwright (b. 1887)

== March 24, 1953 (Tuesday) ==
- Born: Louie Anderson, American comedian and actor, in St. Paul, Minnesota (d. 2022)
- Died:
  - Queen Mary, consort of George V of the United Kingdom, 85
  - Paul Couturier, French priest (b. 1881)

== March 25, 1953 (Wednesday) ==
- Beginning of the Lari Massacre in Kenya: Mau Mau rebels killed up to 150 Kikuyu natives.

== March 26, 1953 (Thursday) ==
- End of the Lari Massacre.
- Jonas Salk announced the development of a polio vaccine.

== March 27, 1953 (Friday) ==
- 1953 New York Central Railroad accident: Three trains collided on the four-track mainline 2.4 miles (3.9 km) east of Conneaut, Ohio, United States, resulting in 21 deaths.
- Born: Annemarie Moser-Pröll, Austrian alpine skier, one title of Winter Olympics, five of FIS Alpine Ski World Championship and 62 of FIS Alpine World Cup, in Kleinarl, State of Salzburg, Austria.

== March 28, 1953 (Saturday) ==
- The World Professional Match-play Championship snooker tournament ended in London, UK, and was won by defending champion, Fred Davis.
- Born: Melchior Ndadaye, President of Burundi 1993, in Nyabihanga (assassinated 1993)
- Died: Jim Thorpe, 65, Native-American athlete and a member of the Pro Football Hall of Fame

== March 29, 1953 (Sunday) ==
- A fire at the Littlefield Nursing Home in Largo, Florida, United States, killed 33 persons.
- The 1953 World Table Tennis Championships ended in Bucharest. The Swaythling Cup for the men's team was won by England and the Corbillon Cup for the women's team by Romania.
- The 15th Gent–Wevelgem cycle race was held in Belgium and was won by Raymond Impanis.
- Died:
  - Arthur Fields, 68, American baritone singer, a victim of the Littlefield Nursing Home fire
  - Väinö Kivisalo, Finnish politician (b. 1882)

== March 30, 1953 (Monday) ==
- The United Nations Security Council nominated Dag Hammarskjöld as United Nations Secretary General.

== March 31, 1953 (Tuesday) ==
- The Barnsley by-election, necessitated by the resignation of long-serving MP Sidney Schofield, took place in the UK, leading to the election of another Labour member, Roy Mason.
- Died: Ivan Lebedeff, Russian actor (b. 1895)
