= 1949 Paris–Roubaix =

Cycling race

Race details
- Dates: 17 April 1949
- Stages: 1
- Distance: 244 km (152 mi)
- Winning time: 6h 11' 59"

Results
| | Winner | Serse Coppi Italy and André Mahé France |
| | Third | Frans Leenen (BEL) |

The 1949 Paris–Roubaix was the 47th edition of the Paris–Roubaix, a classic one-day cycle race in France. The single day event was held on 17 April 1949 and stretched 244 km (152 mi) from Paris to the finish at Roubaix Velodrome. The race was declared as a tie between the Italian cyclist Serse Coppi and the French cyclist André Mahé.

== Results ==
Final results (1–10)
| Rank | Cyclist | Time |
|---|---|---|
| 1 | Serse Coppi (ITA) | 6h 11' 59″ |
| 1 | André Mahé (FRA) | 6h 11' 59″ |
| 3 | Frans Leenen (BEL) | +0' 00″ |
| 4 | Georges Martin (FRA) | +0' 00″ |
| 5 | Jésus-Jacques Moujica (FRA) | +0' 00″ |
| 6 | André Declerck (BEL) | +0' 00″ |
| 7 | Florent Mathieu (BEL) | +0' 00″ |
| 8 | Roger Gyselinck (BEL) | +0' 00″ |
| 9 | Achiel Buysse (BEL) | +0' 00″ |
| 10 | Albert Anciaux (BEL) | +0' 00″ |
