= 1952 Paris–Roubaix =

Cycling race

Race details
- Dates: 13 April 1952
- Stages: 1
- Distance: 245 km (152.2 mi)
- Winning time: 5h 50' 31"

Results
	Winner	Rik Van Steenbergen (BEL)
	Second	Fausto Coppi (ITA)
	Third	André Mahé (FRA)

The 1952 Paris–Roubaix was the 50th edition of the Paris–Roubaix, a classic one-day cycle race in France. The single day event was held on 13 April 1952 and stretched 245 km (152 mi) from Paris to the finish at Roubaix Velodrome. The winner was Rik Van Steenbergen from Belgium.

== Results ==
Final results (1–10)
Rank	Cyclist	Time
1	Rik Van Steenbergen (BEL)	5h 50' 31″
2	Fausto Coppi (ITA)	+0' 00″
3	André Mahé (FRA)	+0' 11″
4	Ferdinand Kübler (SUI)	+0' 57″
5	Jacques Dupont (FRA)	+0' 57″
6	Désiré Keteleer (BEL)	+1' 04″
7	Louison Bobet (FRA)	+1' 23″
8	Robert Varnajo (FRA)	+1' 23″
9	Loretto Petrucci (ITA)	+1' 23″
10	Antonin Rolland (FRA)	+1' 23″
