= Paris–Roubaix =

French one-day cycling race, one of the five monuments

Race details
- Date: Early April
- Region: Northern France
- English name: Paris–Roubaix
- Local name: Paris–Roubaix (in French)
- Nicknames: L'Enfer du Nord (The Hell of the North); Queen of the Classics; The Easter race; A Sunday in Hell
- Discipline: Road
- Competition: UCI World Tour
- Type: One-day
- Organiser: Amaury Sport Organisation
- Race director: Jean-François Pescheux
- Web site: www.paris-roubaix.fr

History
- First edition: 1896; 130 years ago
- Editions: 123 (as of 2026)
- First winner: Josef Fischer (GER)
- Most wins: Roger De Vlaeminck (BEL); Tom Boonen (BEL) (4 wins each)
- Most recent: Wout van Aert (BEL)

Paris–Roubaix [pa.ʁi.ʁu.bɛ] is a one-day professional bicycle road race in France, held on the first Sunday in April and starting north of Paris and finishing in Roubaix, at the border with Belgium. It is one of cycling's oldest races, and is one of the 'Monuments' or classics of the European calendar, and contributes points towards the UCI World Ranking.

From its beginning in 1896 until 1967, the race started in Paris and ended in Roubaix; in 1966 the start moved to Chantilly; and since 1977 it has started in Compiègne, about 85 kilometres (53 mi) north-east of the centre of Paris. Since 1943, the finish has for the most part taken place in the Roubaix Velodrome. The race is currently organised by the media group Amaury Sport Organisation, and takes place in early April, usually on the second Sunday.

Paris–Roubaix is famous for rough terrain and cobblestones, or pavé (setts), (Note: Paris–Roubaix is popularly known throughout the English-speaking world for its 'cobbled sectors', but this is a misnomer as the sectors are actually paved with granite setts, roughly hewn blocks, which are smoother and safer than true cobblestones (prominent rounded pebbles often used on inner city streets). This article maintains the misnomer 'Cobblestones' but attempts to clarify the misnomer where relevant.) being, with the Tour of Flanders, E3 Harelbeke and Gent–Wevelgem, one of the cobbled classics. It has been called the Hell of the North, a Sunday in Hell (also the title of a film about the 1976 race), the Queen of the Classics or la Pascale: the Easter race. Since 1977, the winner of Paris–Roubaix has received a sett (cobble stone) as part of his prize.

The terrain has led to the development of specialised frames, wheels and tyres. Punctures and other mechanical problems are common and often influence the result. Despite the esteem of the race, some cyclists dismiss it because of its difficult conditions. The race has also seen several controversies, with winners disqualified.

The course is maintained by Les Amis de Paris–Roubaix, a group of fans of the race formed in 1983. The forçats du pavé ("convicts of the cobbles") seek to keep the course safe for riders while maintaining its difficulty. Other than during the World Wars and, in 2020, due to the COVID-19 pandemic (the 2020 race was canceled, and the 2021 race was postponed to October), it has taken place every year from its inception.

== History ==
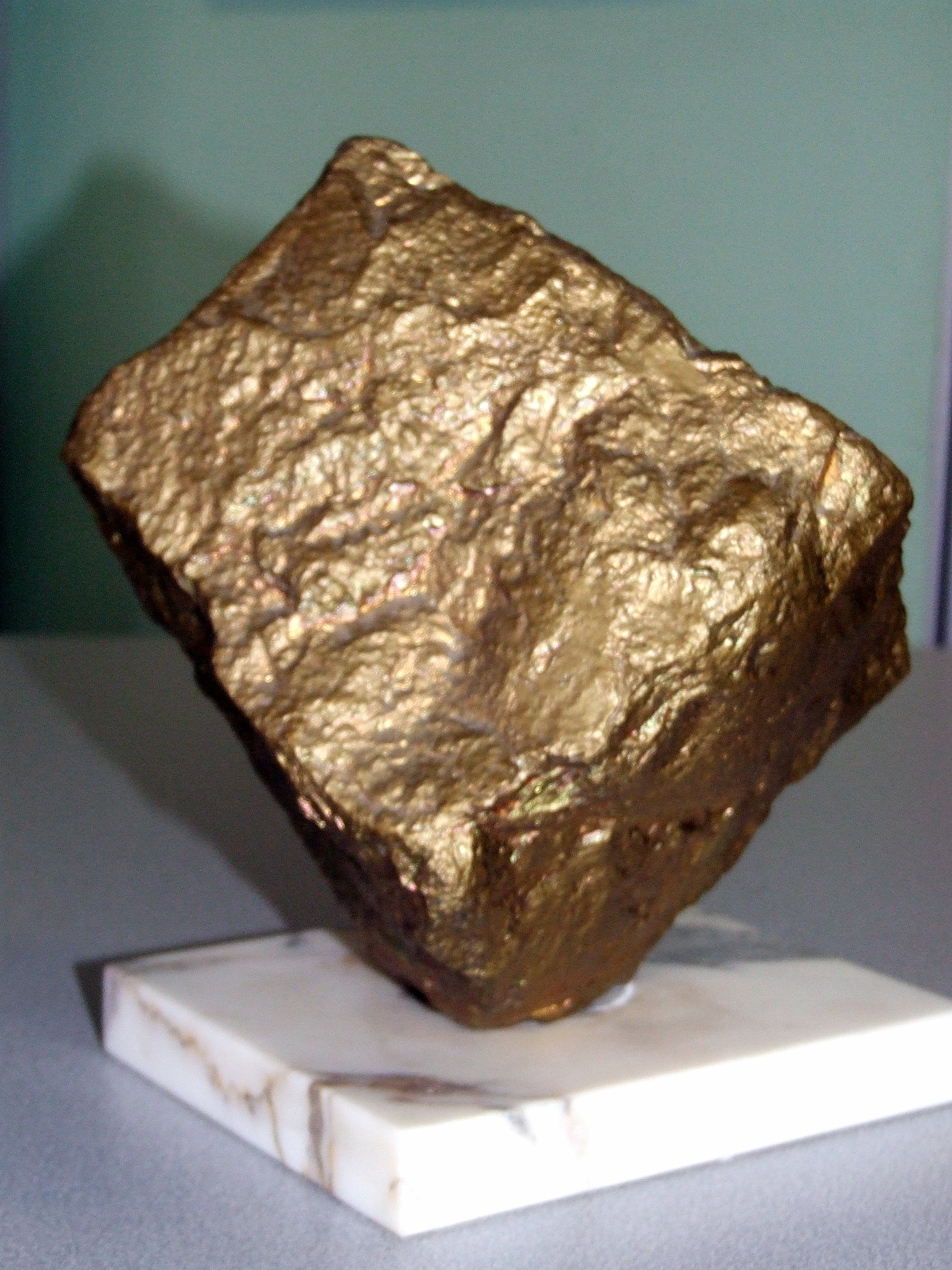
Winners since 1977 have received a mounted cobble (sett); the organisers keep a gold-plated cobble for themselves

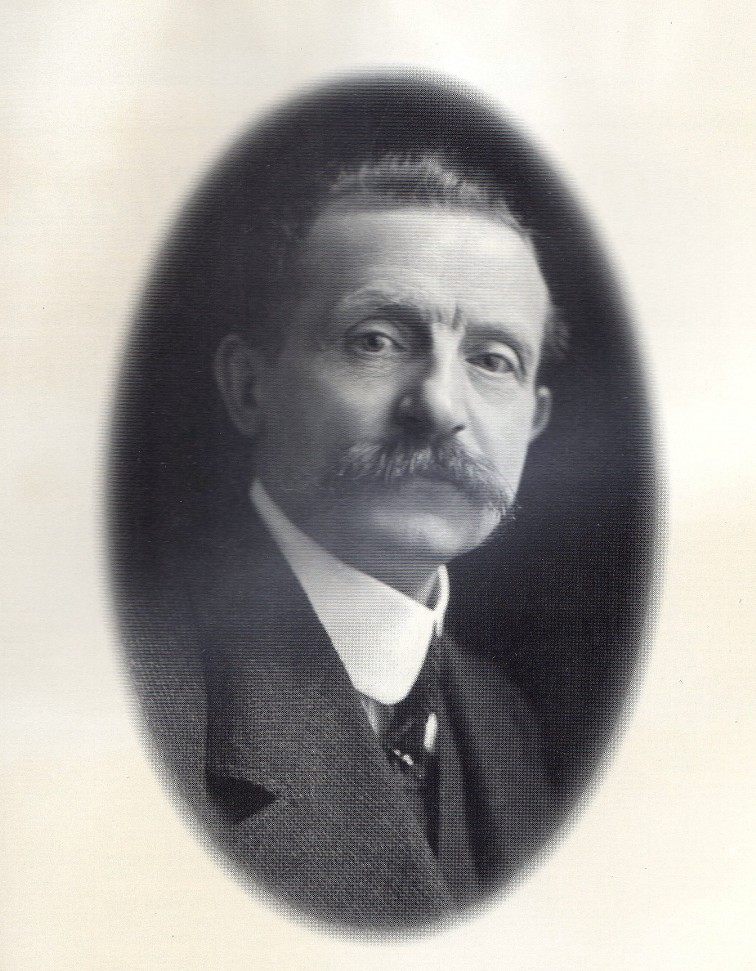
Théodore Vienne Roubaix entrepreneur

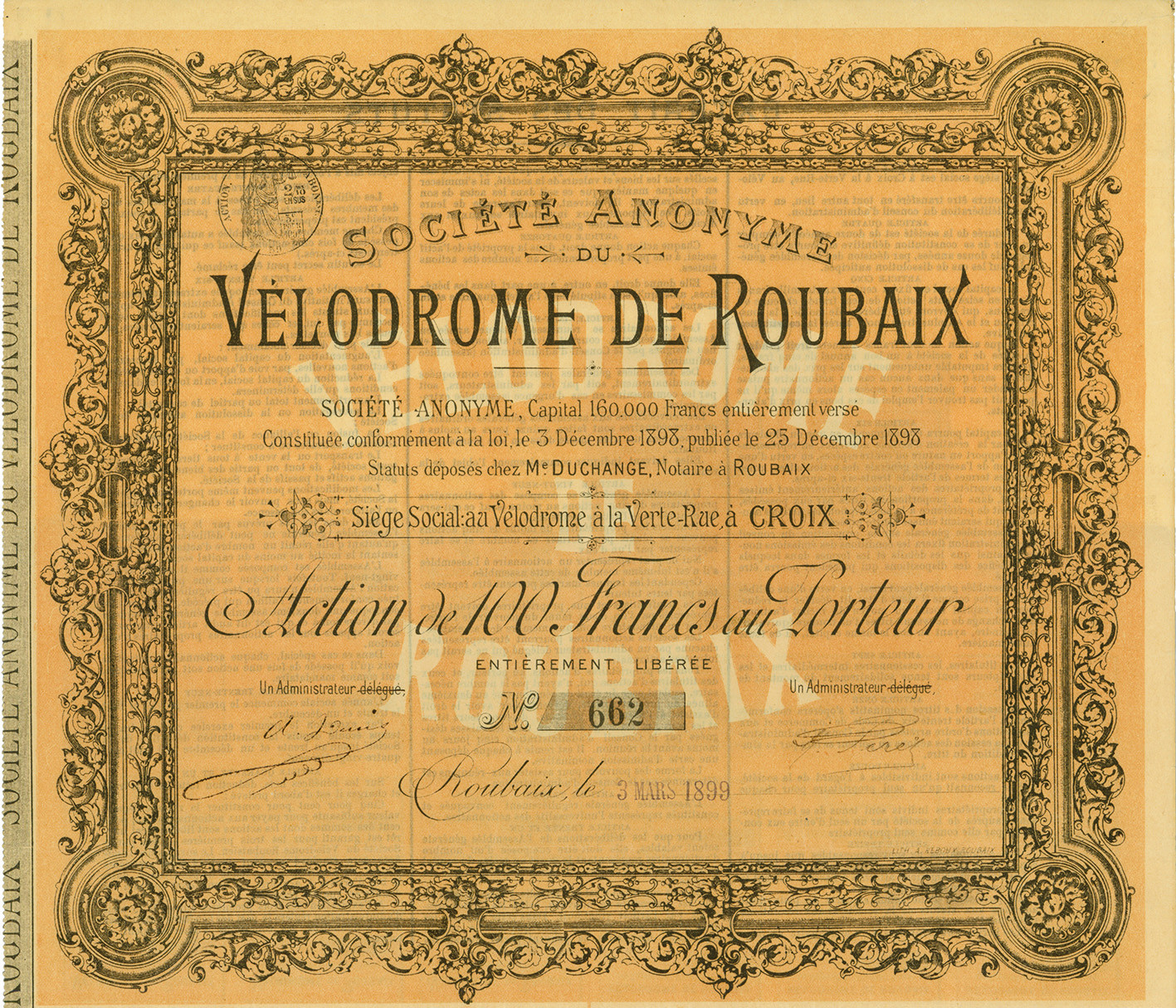
Share of the Société Anonyme du Vélodrome de Roubaix, issued 3 March 1899

Paris–Roubaix is one of the oldest races of professional road cycling. It was first run in 1896 and has stopped only for the two World Wars and the COVID-19 pandemic. The race was created by two Roubaix textile manufacturers, Théodore Vienne (born 28 July 1864) and Maurice Perez. They had been behind the building of a velodrome on 46,000 square metres at the corner of the rue Verte and the route d'Hempempont, which opened on 9 June 1895.

Vienne and Perez held several meetings on the track, one including the first appearance in France by the American sprinter Major Taylor, and then looked for further ideas. In February 1896 they hit on the idea of holding a race from Paris to their track. This presented two problems. The first was that the biggest races started or ended in Paris and that Roubaix might be too provincial a destination. The second was that they could organize the start or finish but not both.

They spoke to Louis Minart, the editor of Le Vélo, the only French daily sports paper. Minart was enthusiastic but said the decision of whether the paper would organize the start and provide publicity belonged to the director, Paul Rousseau. Minart may also have suggested an indirect approach because the mill owners recommended their race not on its own merits, but as preparation for another. They wrote:

Dear M. Rousseau, Bordeaux–Paris is approaching and this great annual event which has done so much to promote cycling has given us an idea. What would you think of a training race which preceded Bordeaux–Paris by four weeks? The distance between Paris and Roubaix is roughly 280 km, so it would be child's play for the future participants of Bordeaux–Paris. The finish would take place at the Roubaix vélodrome after several laps of the track. Everyone would be assured of an enthusiastic welcome as most of our citizens have never had the privilege of seeing the spectacle of a major road race and we count on enough friends to believe that Roubaix is truly a hospitable town. As prizes we already have subscribed to a first prize of 1,000 francs in the name of the Roubaix velodrome and we will be busy establishing a generous prize list which will be to the satisfaction of all. But for the moment, can we count on the patronage of Le Vélo and on your support for organising the start?

The proposed first prize represented seven months' wages for a miner at the time.

Rousseau was enthusiastic and sent his cycling editor, Victor Breyer, to find a route. Breyer travelled to Amiens in a Panhard driven by his colleague, Paul Meyan. The following morning Breyer—later deputy organiser of the Tour de France and a leading official of the Union Cycliste Internationale—continued by bike. The wind blew, the rain fell and the temperature dropped. Breyer reached Roubaix filthy and exhausted after a day of riding on cobbles (setts). He swore he would send a telegram to Minart urging him to drop the idea, saying it was dangerous to send a race the way he had just ridden. But that evening a meal and drinks with the team from Roubaix changed his mind.

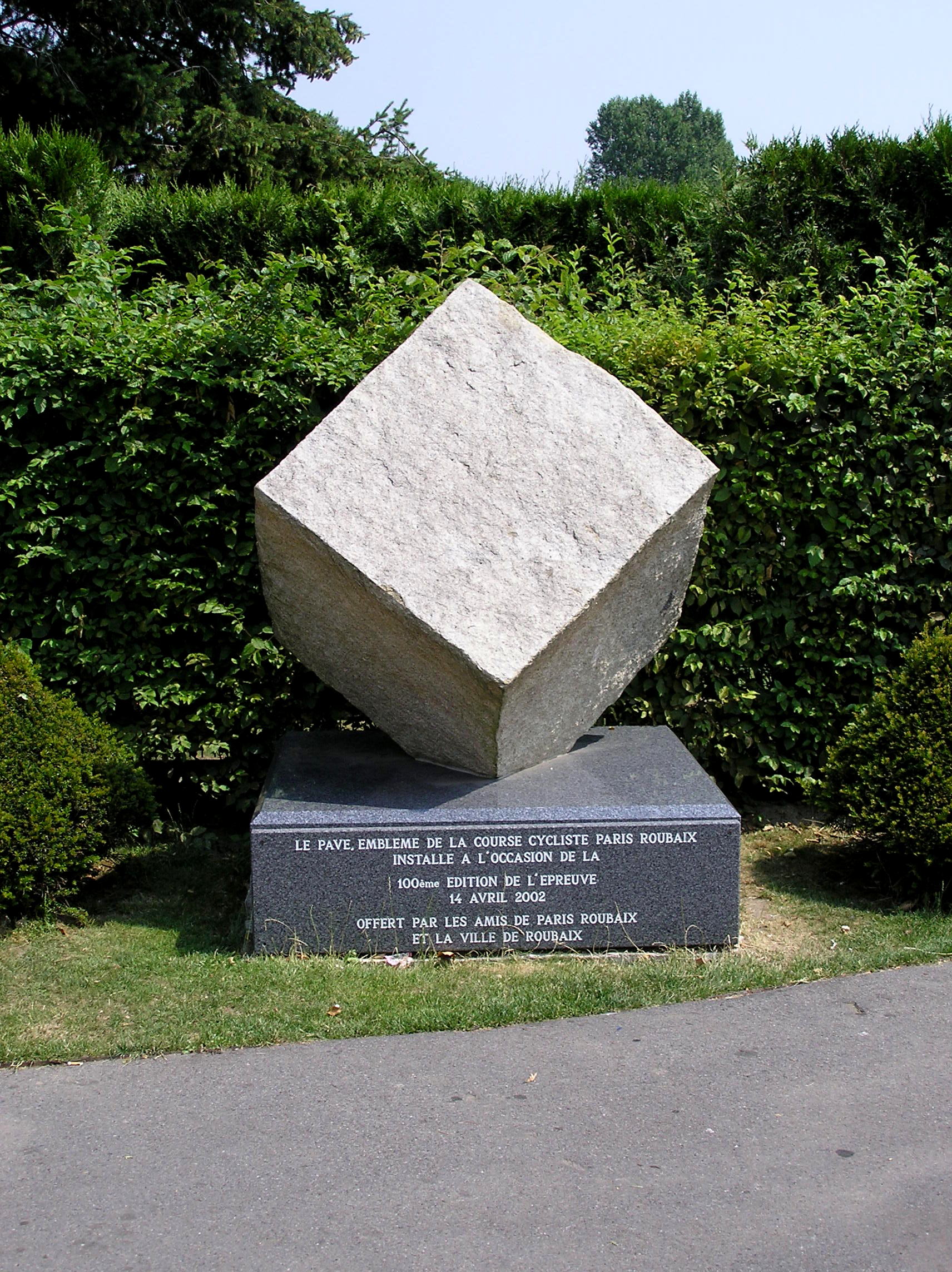
Cobblestone Emblem of Paris–Roubaix, Donated on the 100th anniversary by 'Les Amis de Paris–Roubaix' and 'La Ville de Roubaix' 50.678548°N 3.204612°E

=== Easter mystery ===
Vienne and Perez scheduled their race for Easter Sunday. The Roman Catholic Church objected to it being held on the most sacred day of the liturgical year, suggesting that riders would not have time to attend mass and that spectators might not bother to attend either. (Note: The Roman Catholic Church objected to the race being run on Easter Sunday, though who and at what level within the Church the objection was made has been lost to history.) Tracts were distributed in Roubaix decrying the venture.

What happened next is uncertain. Legend says that Vienne and Perez promised a mass would be said for the riders in a chapel 200 m from the start, in the boulevard Maillot. This story is repeated by Pascal Sergent, the historian of the race, and by Pierre Chany, historian of the sport in general. Sergent goes as far as saying that Victor Breyer, who he says was there, said the service, scheduled for 4 am, was cancelled because it was too early. Neither Chany nor Sergent mentions if the date of the race was subsequently changed; however, the first Paris–Roubaix (according to Sergent) was held on 19 April 1896, whereas Easter Sunday in 1896 occurred two weeks earlier, on 5 April.

The first Paris–Roubaix on Easter Sunday was the next year, 1897.

=== The first race ===
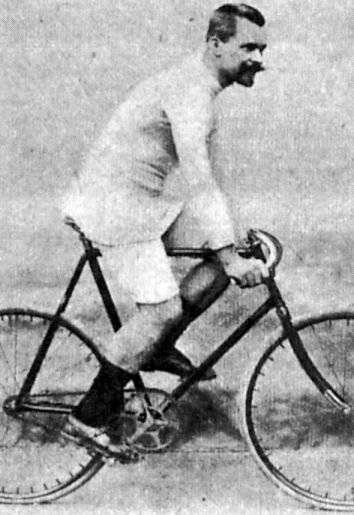
Josef Fischer won the first edition of Paris–Roubaix.

News of Breyer's ride to Roubaix may have spread. Half those who entered did not turn up at the Brassérie de l'Espérance, the race headquarters at the start. Those who dropped out before the race began included Henri Desgrange, a prominent track rider who went on to organize the Tour de France. The starters did include Maurice Garin, who went on to win Desgrange's first Tour and was the local hope in Roubaix because he and two brothers had opened a cycle shop in the boulevard de Paris the previous year.

Garin came third, 15 minutes behind Josef Fischer, the only German to have won the race until 2015. Only four finished within an hour of the winner. Garin would have come second had he not been knocked over by a crash between two tandems, one of them ridden by his pacers. Garin "finished exhausted and Dr Butrille was obliged to attend the man who had been run over by two machines", said Sergent.

=== The second race ===
Garin won the following year, beating Dutchman Mathieu Cordang in the last two kilometres of the velodrome at Roubaix. (Note: In 2004 Les Amis de Paris–Roubaix marked Garin's victories in the Paris–Roubaix event by placing a cobblestone—traditional trophy for winners of the race, on his grave. See "Hommage à Maurice Garin" (in French). Les Amis de Paris–Roubaix. 3 March 2004. Archived from the original on 12 October 2013.) Sergent said:

As the two champions appeared they were greeted by a frenzy of excitement and everyone was on their feet to acclaim the two heroes. It was difficult to recognise them. Garin was first, followed by the mud-soaked figure of Cordang. Suddenly, to the stupefaction of everyone, Cordang slipped and fell on the velodrome's cement surface. Garin could not believe his luck. By the time Cordang was back on his bike, he had lost 100 metres. There remained six laps to cover. Two miserable kilometres in which to catch Garin. The crowd held its breath as they watched the incredible pursuit match. The bell rang out. One lap, there remained one lap. 333 metres for Garin, who had a lead of 30 metres on the Batave.

A classic victory was within his grasp but he could almost feel his adversary's breath on his neck. Somehow Garin held on to his lead of two metres, two little metres for a legendary victory. The stands exploded and the ovation united the two men. Garin exulted under the cheers of the crowd. Cordang cried bitter tears of disappointment.

=== Hell of the North ===
The race usually leaves riders caked in mud and grit, from the cobbled roads and rutted tracks of northern France's former coal-mining region. However, this is not how this race earned the name l'enfer du Nord, or Hell of the North. The term was used to describe the route of the race after World War I. Organisers and journalists set off from Paris in 1919 to see how much of the route had survived four years of shelling and trench warfare. Procycling reported:

They knew little of the permanent effects of the war. Nine million had died and France lost more than any. But, as elsewhere, news was scant. Who even knew if there was still a road to Roubaix? If Roubaix was still there? The car of organisers and journalists made its way along the route those first riders had gone. And at first all looked well. There was destruction and there was poverty and there was a strange shortage of men. But France had survived. But then, as they neared the north, the air began to reek of broken drains, raw sewage and the stench of rotting cattle. Trees which had begun to look forward to spring became instead blackened, ragged stumps, their twisted branches pushed to the sky like the crippled arms of a dying man. Everywhere was mud. Nobody knows who first described it as 'hell', but there was no better word. And that's how it appeared next day in the papers: that little party had seen 'the hell of the north.'

The words in L'Auto were:

We enter into the centre of the battlefield. There's not a tree, everything is flattened! Not a square metre that has not been hurled upside down. There's one shell hole after another. The only things that stand out in this churned earth are the crosses with their ribbons in blue, white and red. It is hell! '

This wasn't a race. It was a pilgrimage.

— Henri Pélissier, speaking of his 1919 victory.

=== History of the cobbles ===
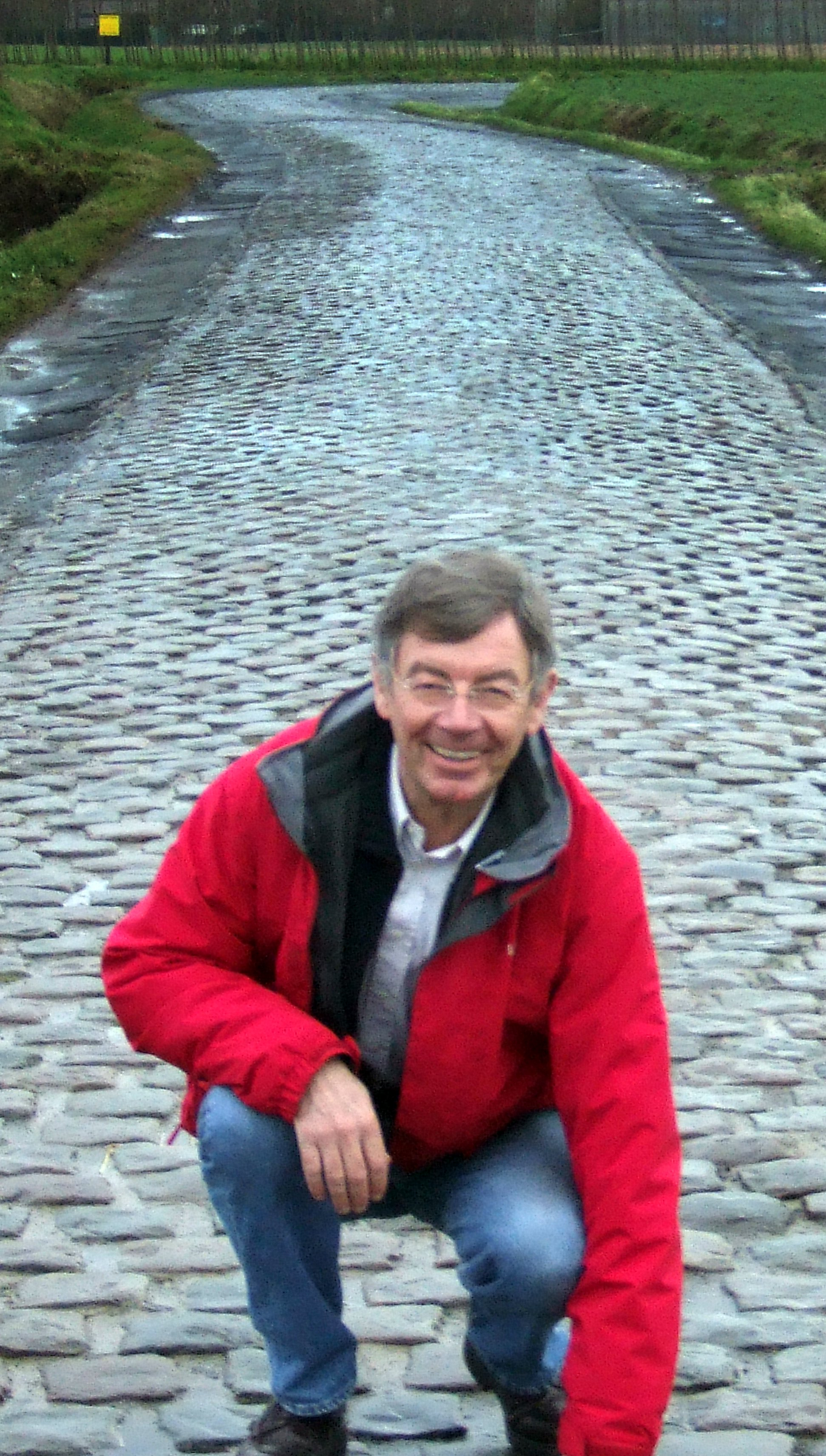
Alain Bernard, President of 'Les Amis de Paris–Roubaix': "These days the mayors come to me with cobbles."

Seeking the challenge of racing on cobbles is relatively recent. It began at the same time in Paris–Roubaix and the Tour of Flanders, when widespread improvements to roads after the Second World War brought realisation that the character of both races were changing. Until then the race had been over cobbles not because they were bad but because that was how roads were made. André Mahé, who won in 1949 (see below Controversies), said:

After the war, of course, the roads were all bad. There were cobbles from the moment you left Paris, or Senlis where we started in those days. There'd be stretches of surfaced roads and often there'd be a cycle path or a pavement and sometimes a thin stretch of something smoother. But you never knew where was best to ride and you were for ever switching about. You could jump your bike up on to a pavement but that got harder the more tired you got. Then you'd get your front wheel up but not your back wheel. That happened to me. And then you'd go sprawling, of course, and you could bring other riders down. Or they'd fall off and bring you down with them. And the cycle paths were often just compressed cinders, which got soft in the rain and got churned up by so many riders using them and then you got stuck and you lost your balance. And come what may, you got covered in coal dust and other muck. No, it's all changed and you can't compare then and now.

The coming of live television prompted mayors along the route to surface their cobbled roads for fear the rest of France would see them as backward and not invested in the region. Albert Bouvet, the organiser, said: "If things don't change, we'll soon be calling it Paris–Valenciennes", reference to a flat race on good roads that often ends in a mass sprint. L'Équipe said: "The riders don't deserve that." Its editor, Jacques Goddet, called Paris–Roubaix "the last great madness of cycling." Bouvet and Jean-Claude Vallaeys formed Les Amis de Paris–Roubaix (see below). Its president, Alain Bernard, led enthusiasts to look for and sometimes maintain obscure cobbled paths. He said:

Until the war, Paris–Roubaix was all on routes nationales. But many of those were cobbled, which was the spirit of the race, and the riders used to try to ride the cycle paths, if there were any. So Paris–Roubaix has always been on pavé, because pavé was what the roads were made of. Then in 1967 things began to change. There was less pavé than there had been. And so from 1967 the course started moving to the east to use the cobbles that remained there. And then those cobbles began to disappear as well and we feared that Bouvet's predictions were going to come true. That's when we started going out looking for old tracks and abandoned roads that didn't show up on our maps. In the 1970s, the race only had to go through a village for the mayor to order the road to be surfaced. Pierre Mauroy, when he was mayor of Lille, said he wanted nothing to do with the race and that he'd do nothing to help it. A few years ago, there was barely a village or an area that wanted anything to do with us. If Paris–Roubaix came their way, they felt they were shamed because we were exposing their bad roads. They went out and surfaced them, did all they could to obstruct us. Now they can't get enough of us. I have mayors ringing me to say they've found another stretch of cobbles and would we like to use them.

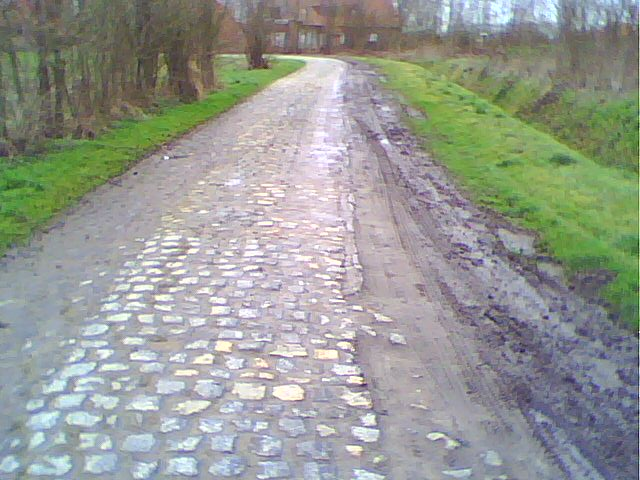
The first section of pavé at the Carrefour de l'Arbre

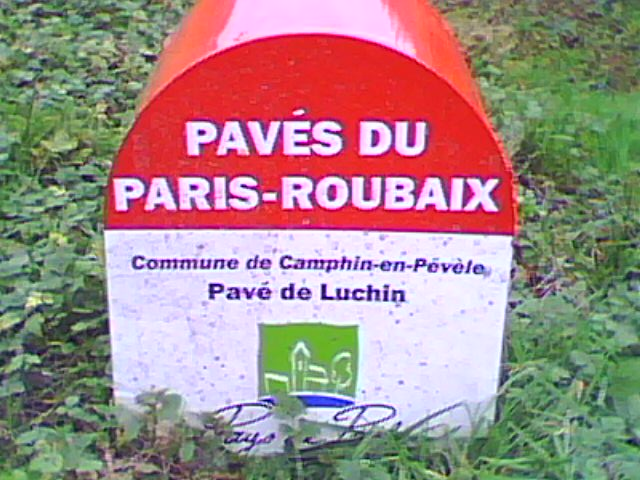
Commemorative marker-post for the Pavé de Luchin at the Carrefour de l'Arbre

It was Alain Bernard who found one of the race's most significant cobbled stretches, the Carrefour de l'Arbre. He was out on a Sunday ride, turned off the main road to see what was there and found the last bad cobbles before the finish. It is a bleak area with just a bar by the crossroads. Bernard said:

Until then, it [the bar ('Café de l'Arbre')] was open only one day a year. In France, a bar has to open one day a year to keep its licence. That's all it did, because it's out in the middle of nowhere and nobody went there to drink any more. With the fame that the race brought it, it's now open all year and a busy restaurant as well.

The Amis de Paris–Roubaix spend €10–15,000 a year on restoring and rebuilding cobbles. The Amis supply the sand and other material and the repairs are made as training by students from horticulture schools at Dunkirk, Lomme, Raismes and Douai. Each section costs €4–6,000, paid for equally by the Amis, the organisers and the local commune. Bernard said:

The trouble is that the Belgians then come out to see the race and they pull up a cobble stone each and take it home as a souvenir. They've even gone off with the milestones. It's a real headache. But I'm confident now that Paris–Roubaix is safe, that it will always be the race it has always been.

=== Strategic places of historic races ===
The strategic places where earlier races could be won or lost include Doullens Hill, Arras, Carvin and the Wattignies bend. Some sections of cobbles have deteriorated beyond the point of safety and repair or have been resurfaced and lost their significance. Other sections are excluded because the route of the race has moved east.

=== Pacers ===
Early races were run behind pacers, as were many competitions of the era. The first pacers were other cyclists, on bicycles or tandems. Cars and motorcycles were allowed to pace from 1898. The historian Fer Schroeders says:

In 1898, even cars and motorcycles were allowed to open the road for the competitors. In 1900, the race was within a hair's breadth of disappearing, with only 19 riders at the start. The following year, the organisation therefore decided to allow help only from pacers on bicycles. And in 1910, help from pacers were stopped for good. An option which lifted Paris–Roubaix out of the background and pushed it, in terms of interest, ahead of the prestigious Bordeaux–Paris. (Note: The Bordeaux–Paris race stayed with pacers until 1985.)

== Course ==
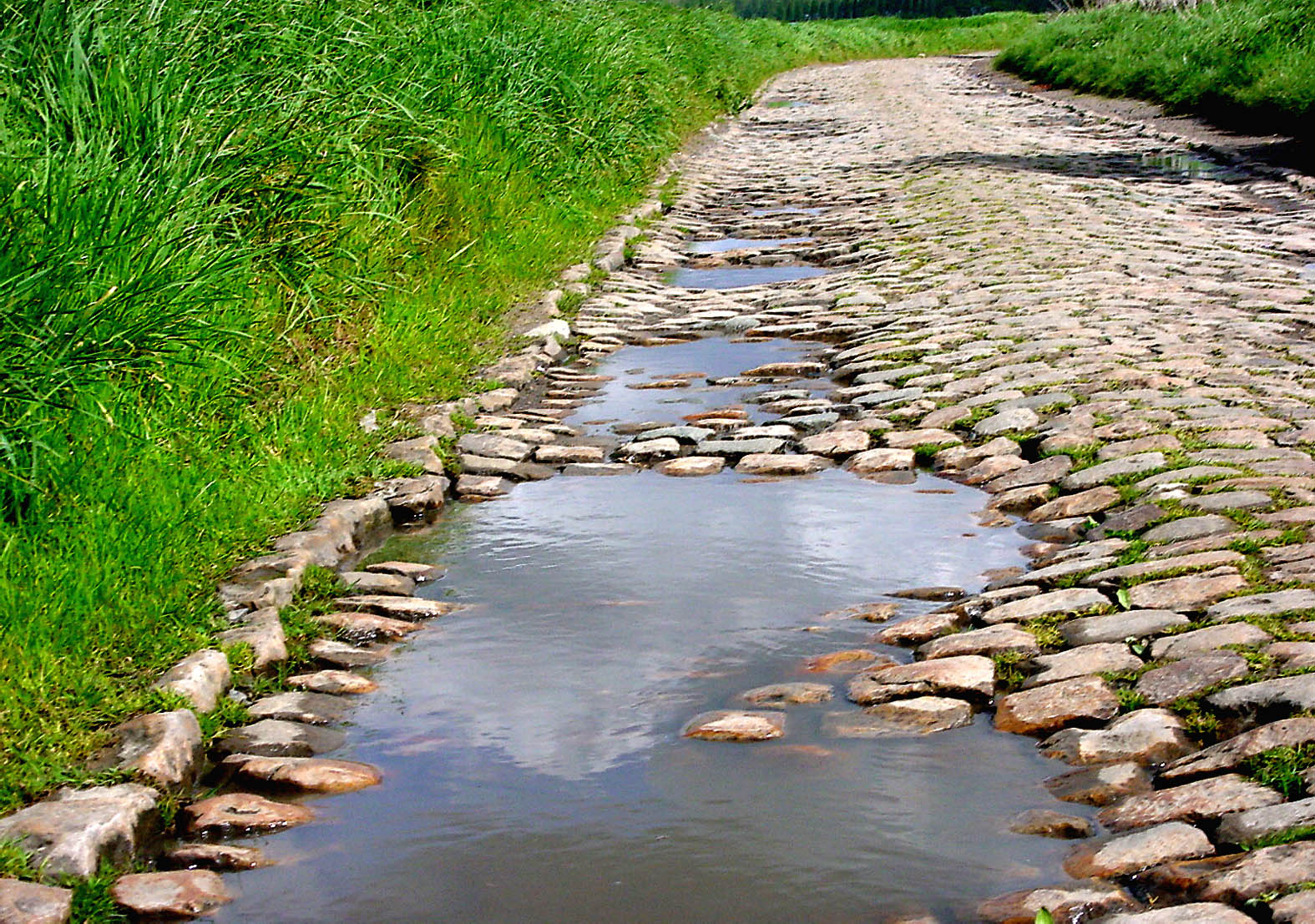
Cobblestone in northern France, near Lille

Originally, the race was from Paris to Roubaix, but in 1966 the start moved to Chantilly, 50 km north, then in 1977 to Compiègne, 80 km north. From Compiègne it now follows a 260 km winding route north to Roubaix, hitting the first cobbles after 100 km. During the last 150 km the cobbles extend more than 50 km. The race culminates with 750m on the smooth concrete of the large outdoor Vélodrome André-Pétrieux in Roubaix. The route is adjusted from year to year as older roads are resurfaced and the organisers seek more cobbles to maintain the character of the race—in 2005, for example, the race included 54.7 km of cobbles.

=== The start ===
The race has started at numerous places:

- 1896–1897: Porte Maillot, Paris
- 1898–1899: Chatou
- 1900: Saint-Germain
- 1901: Porte Maillot, Paris
- 1902–1913: Chatou
- 1914: Suresnes
- 1919–1928: Suresnes
- 1929–1937: Porte Maillot, Paris
- 1938: Argenteuil
- 1939: Porte Maillot, Paris
- 1943–1965: Saint-Denis
- 1966–1976: Chantilly
- 1977–present: Compiègne

The opening kilometres (the départ fictif) have often been a rolling procession. Racing has started further into the ride (départ réel). The start of open racing has been at:

- 1896–1897: Porte Maillot
- 1898–1899: Chatou
- 1900: Saint-Germain
- 1901: Porte Maillot
- 1902–1913: Chatou
- 1914: Suresnes
- 1919: Suresnes
- 1920–1922: Chatou
- 1923–1929: Le Vésinet
- 1930–1938: Argenteuil
- 1939: Le Vésinet

=== Main cobbled sectors ===
The organisers grade the cobbles by length, irregularity, the general condition and their position in the race.

==== Troisvilles to Inchy ====
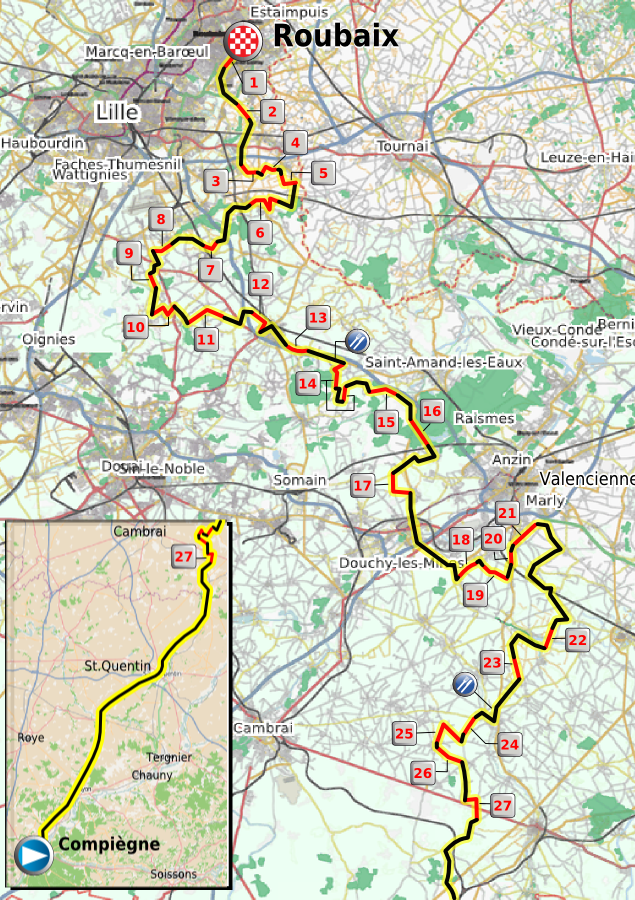
27 cobble sections of 2011

This sector is now usually the first cobbled section, typically about 100 km into the race, and was first used 1987. It is the highest of all the cobbles at 136 m.

==== Wallers Haveluy ====
A 2.5 km sector named after Bernard Hinault, the 1981 winner, which also features frequently in the Quatre Jours de Dunkerque race. It starts at 31m and finishes at 34m. It begins with a gentle rise and finishes with a gentle fall.

==== Trouée d'Arenberg ====
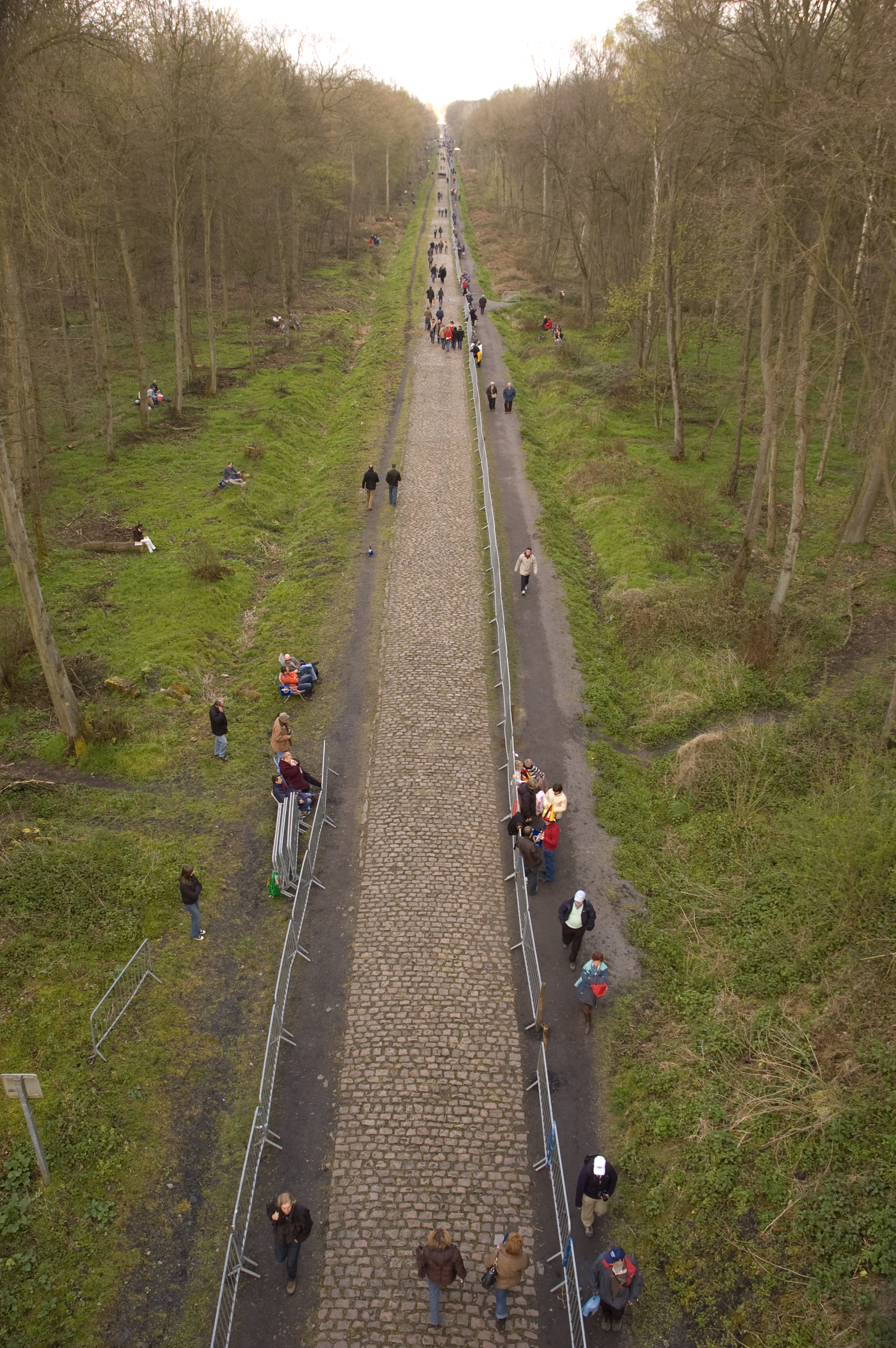
Trouee d'Arenberg – 2008 Paris–Roubaix

The Trouée d'Arenberg, Tranchée d'Arenberg, (Trench of Arenberg), Trouee de Wallers Arenberg, has become the symbol of Paris–Roubaix. Officially 'La Drève des Boules d'Herin', the 2400m of cobbles were laid in the time of Napoleon I through the Raismes Forest-Saint-Amand-Wallers, close to Wallers and Valenciennes. (50.399°N 3.4125°E) The road was proposed for Paris–Roubaix by former professional Jean Stablinski, who had worked in the mine under the woods of Arenberg. The mine closed in 1990 and the passage is now preserved. Although almost 100 km from Roubaix, the sector usually proves decisive and as Stablinski said,

Paris–Roubaix is not won in Arenberg, but from there the group with the winners is selected.

A memorial to Stablinski stands at one end of the road.

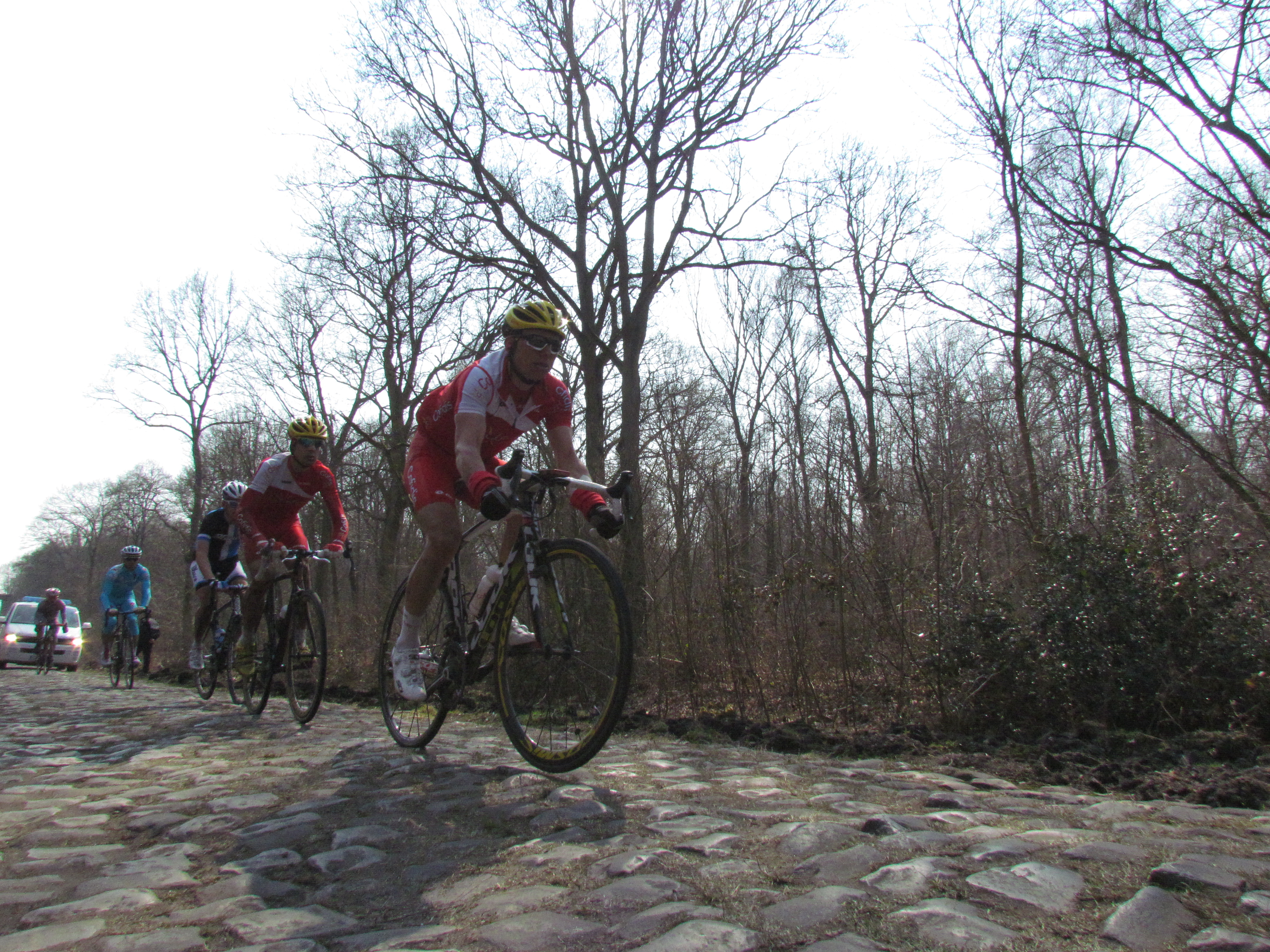
2013 Paris–Roubaix, Forest of Arenberg

Introduced in 1968, the passage was closed from 1974 to 1983 by the Office National des Fôrets. Until 1998 the entry to the Arenberg pavé was slightly downhill, leading to a sprint for best position. The route was reversed in 1999 to reduce the speed. This was as a result of Johan Museeuw's crash in 1998 as World Cup leader, which resulted in gangrene so severe that amputation of his leg was considered. In 2005 the Trouée d'Arenberg was left out, organisers saying conditions had deteriorated beyond safety limits as abandoned mines had caused sections to subside. The regional and local councils (Note: The Conseil Général du Nord and the Communauté de la Porte du Hainaut) spent €250,000 on adding 50 cm to restore the original width of three metres and the race continued using it. The Italian rider Filippo Pozzato said after trying the road after its repairs:

It's the true definition of hell. It's very dangerous, especially in the first kilometre when we enter it at more than 60kmh. It's unbelievable. The bike goes in all directions. It will be a real spectacle but I don't know if it's really necessary to impose it on us.

In 2001 a French rider, Philippe Gaumont, broke his femur after falling at the start of the Trouée when leading the peloton. He said:

What I went through, only I will ever know. My knee cap completely turned to the right, a ball of blood forming on my leg and the bone that broke, without being able to move my body. And the pain, a pain that I wouldn't wish on anyone. The surgeon placed a big support [un gros matériel] in my leg, because the bone had moved so much. Breaking a femur is always serious in itself but an open break in an athlete of high level going flat out, that tears the muscles. At 180 beats [a minute of the heart], there was a colossal amount of blood being pumped, which meant my leg was full of blood. I'm just grateful that the artery was untouched.

Gaumont spent a month and a half in bed, unable to move, and was fitted with a 40 mm section fixed just above the knee and, to the head of the femur, with a 12 mm screw. So many fans have taken away cobbles as souvenirs that the Amis de Paris–Roubaix have had to replace them.

In 2024, a chicane was added prior to the entrance of the forest to slow the speed of riders and improve safety. Some criticised the decision, with Mathieu van der Poel stating "Is this a joke?".

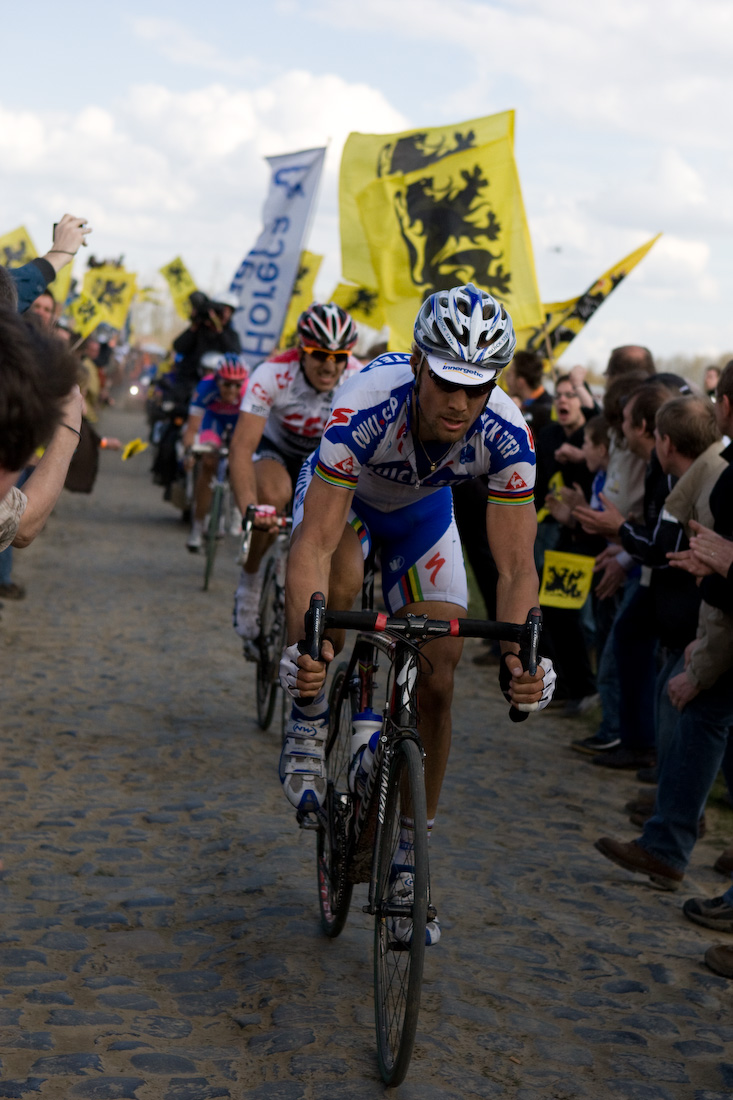
Tom Boonen followed by Fabian Cancellara in the 2008 Paris–Roubaix

==== Mons-en-Pévèle ====
The second of three sectors usually graded as five star difficulty, this 3 km sector includes a 16m rise and 2 right-angled turns. It was first used in 1978 and, as of 2016, has been used every year since except 2001.

==== Carrefour de l'Arbre ====
Le Carrefour de l'Arbre (or Pavé de Luchin) is the last section of pavé of the hardest level of difficulty, five stars. The crossroads (carrefour) is on open land between Gruson and Camphin-en-Pévèle. The route departs westward from Camphin-en-Pévèle along the rue de Cysoing towards Camphin de l'Arbre. The first half is a series of corners, then along irregular pavé towards Luchin. The second half finishes at the Café de l'Arbre restaurant and has more even pavé. This 2.1 km sector has often proved decisive due to its proximity to Roubaix (15 km) and cumulative difficulty. In 2023, the Camphin-en-Pévèle sector was renamed after three-time winner Eddy Merckx, who became the sixth rider to have a sector named after them.

==== Roubaix, Espace Charles Crupelandt ====
Jean Metzinger, 1912, At the Cycle-Race Track (Au Vélodrome), oil and sand on canvas, 130.4 x 97.1 cm, Peggy Guggenheim Collection. This painting illustrates the final meters of the Paris–Roubaix race, and portrays its 1912 winner Charles Crupelandt.

The final stretch of cobbles before the stadium is named after a local rider, Charles Crupelandt, who won in 1912 and 1914. The organiser of the Tour de France, Henri Desgrange, predicted he would win his race. Crupelandt then went to war and returned a hero, with the Croix de Guerre.

This 300 m sector was created for the centenary event in 1996 by laying a strip of smooth new cobbles down the centre of a wide street. Among the cobbles are plaques to every race winner, giving the road an official name of 'Chemin des Géants,' [Road of the Giants].

=== The finish ===
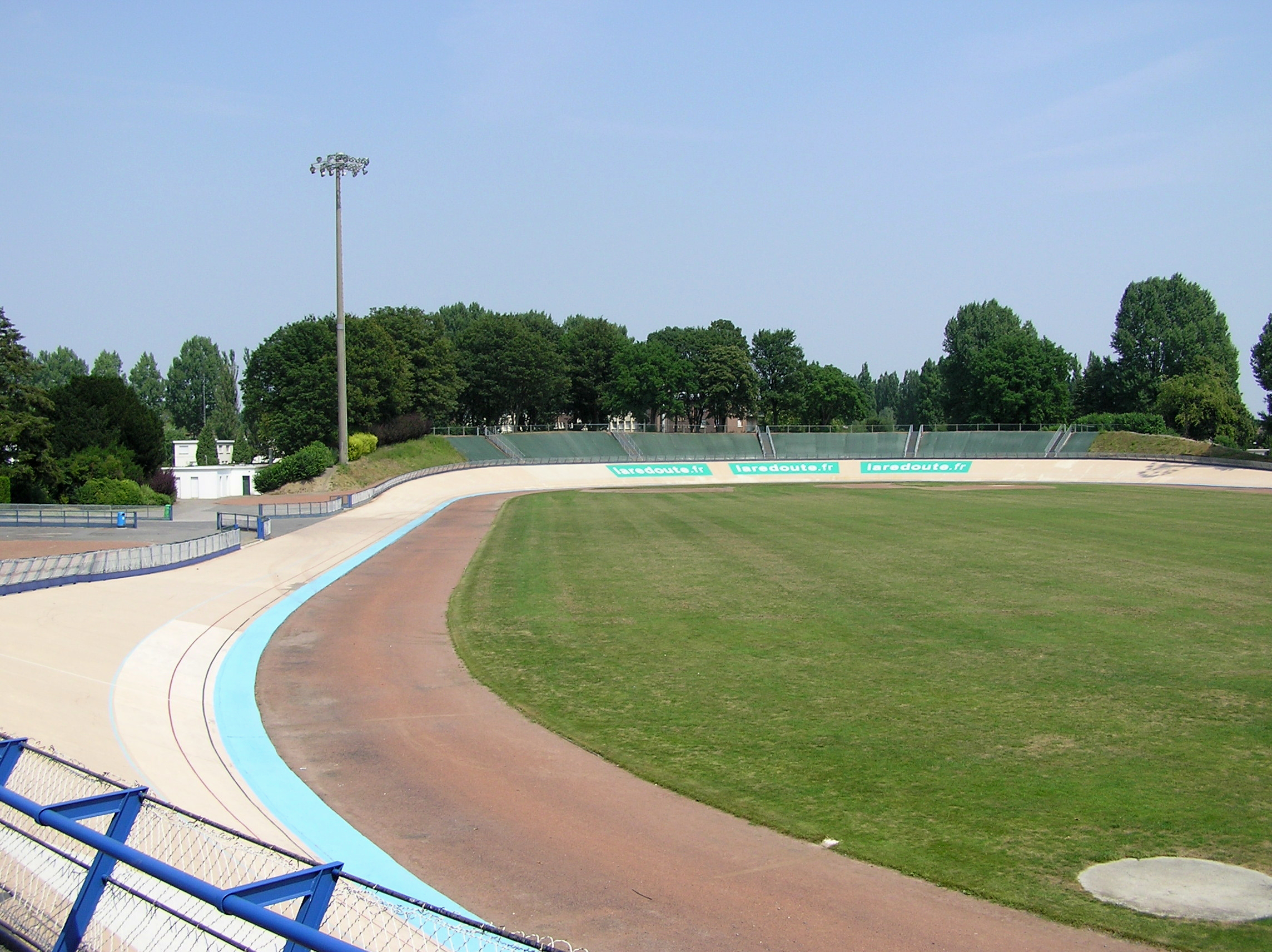
The last 750m are in the vélodrome in Roubaix

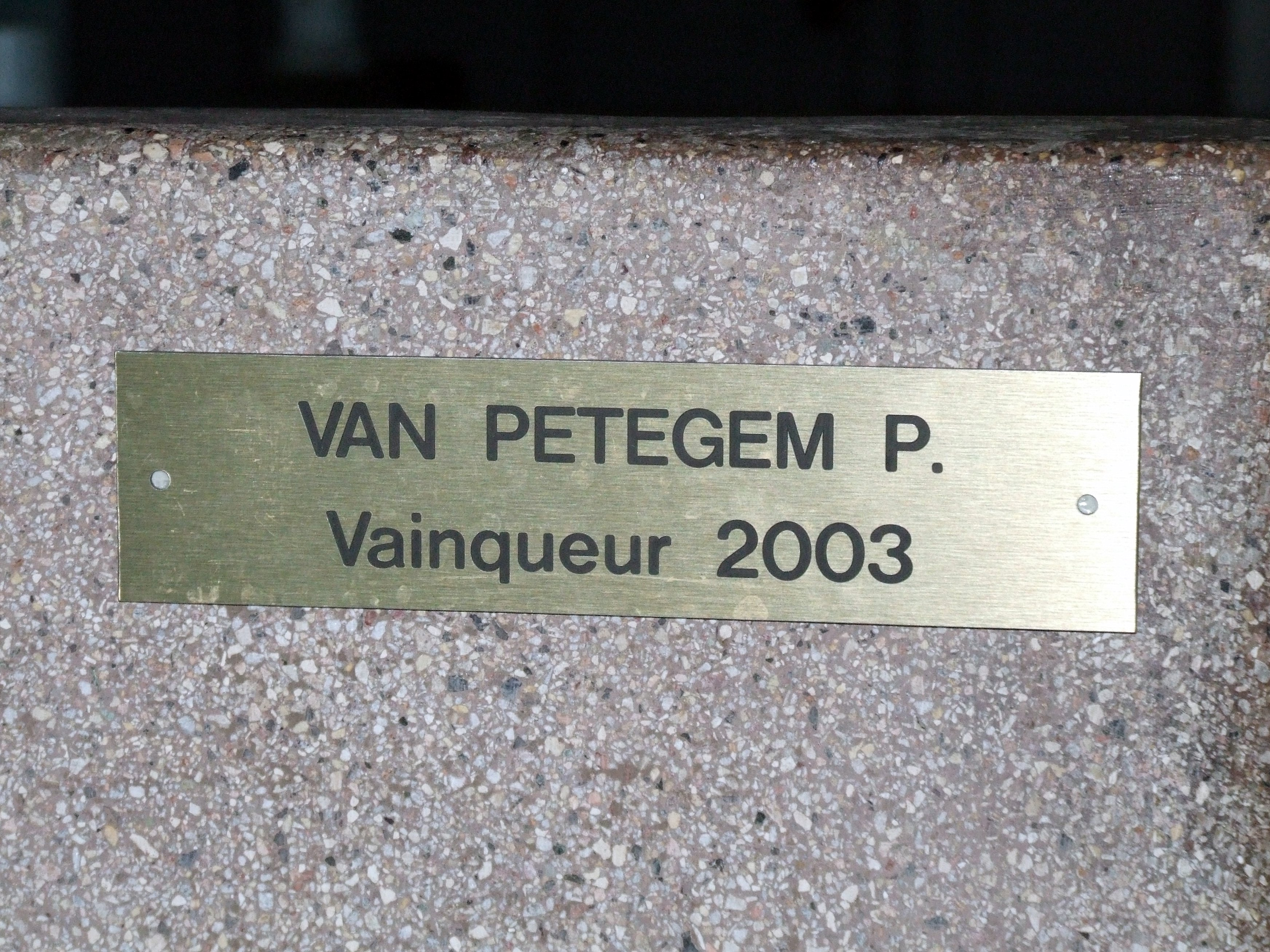
Shower cubicles at Roubaix track are named after winners

The finish until 1914 was on the original track at Croix, where the Parc clinic now stands. There were then various finish points:

- 1896–1914: Rue Verte/route d'Hempempont, Croix, Roubaix
- 1919: avenue de Jussieu, Roubaix, behind the dairy
- 1920–1921: Stadium Jean Dubrulle, Roubaix
- 1922–1928: avenue des Villas (now the avenue Gustave Delory), Roubaix
- 1929: Stade Amédée Prouvost, Wattrelos
- 1930–1934: avenue des Villas, Roubaix
- 1935–1936: Flandres horse track, Marcq
- 1937–1939: avenue Gustave Delory (former avenue des Villas), Roubaix
- 1943–1985: Roubaix Velodrome
- 1986–1988: avenue des Nations-Unies
- 1989–present (April 2022): Roubaix Velodrome

The race moved to the current stadium in 1943, and there it has stayed with the exceptions of 1986, 1987 and 1988 when the finish was in the avenue des Nations-Unies, outside the offices of La Redoute, the mail-order company which sponsored the race.

The shower room inside the velodrome is distinctive for the open, three-sided, low-walled concrete stalls, each with a brass plaque to commemorate a winner. These include Peter Van Petegem, Eddy Merckx, Roger De Vlaeminck, Rik Van Looy and Fausto Coppi.

When I stand in the showers in Roubaix, I actually start the preparation for next year.

— Tom Boonen, 2004.

A commemorative plaque at 37 avenue Gustave Delory honours Émile Masson Jr., the last to win there.

== Bicycles ==
Paris–Roubaix presents a technical challenge to riders, team personnel, and equipment. Special frames and wheels are often used. In the past, developments to cope with the demands of Paris–Roubaix have included the use of wider tires, cantilever brakes, and dual brake levers. More recently, manufacturers such as Specialized have developed new types of bike which are designed to cope with the demands on the cobbled classics: the best known being the Specialized Roubaix series, which has a longer wheelbase and is designed to offer the rider a more forgiving ride. Many teams disperse personnel along the course with spare wheels, equipment and bicycles to help in locations not accessible to the team car.

André Mahé, winner in 1948, said such specialisation is recent:

... [In 1948] We rode the same bikes as the rest of the season. We didn't need to change them because they were much less rigid than modern bikes. The frames moved all over the place. When I attacked, I could feel the bottom bracket swaying underneath me. On the other hand, we had more cobbles. People talk of the amount of cobbles they have now, but when they've finished them they're back on surfaced roads.

Riders have experimented, however. After the Second World War many tried wooden rims of the sort used at the start of cycle racing. Francesco Moser wrapped his handlebars with strips of foam in the 1970s. Gilbert Duclos-Lassalle and Greg LeMond experimented with suspension in their front forks in the 1990s.

Some top riders receive special frames to give more stability and comfort. Different materials make the ride more comfortable. Tom Boonen, using a Time frame with longer wheelbase for the first time, won the race in 2005 and has since continued to use a bike with a longer wheelbase. George Hincapie had a frame featuring a 2 mm elastomer insert at the top of the seat stays. The manufacturers claimed this took nearly all the shock out of the cobbles. Hincapie's Trek bicycle fared less well in 2006: his aluminum steerer tube snapped with 46 km to go, the crash injuring his shoulder.

Canadian rider Steve Bauer had a frame built by Eddy Merckx Bicycles with extremely slack angles, to the extent of being semi-recumbent. It was not a success and was only used for one edition of the race.

The bicycle made for Peter Van Petegem in 2004 was a Time. The distance from bottom bracket to rear axle was 419 mm rather than his normal 403. The distance from the bottom bracket to the front hub was 605 mm instead of 600 mm. The depth of the front forks was 372 mm instead of 367.5 mm The forks were spaced to take 28 mm tyres. The sprockets were steel rather than alloy and the steerer column was cut 5 mm higher than usual to raise the handlebars if needed before the start.

The bad roads cause frequent punctures. A service fleet consisting of four motorcycles and four cars provides spares to riders regardless of team. Yves Hézard of Mavic, the equipment company which provides the coverage, said:

Every year we change fewer wheels, because the wheels and tyres are getting better and better. We changed about 20 wheels today. Five years ago, it was much worse—we'd be changing about a hundred. Tyres are becoming much better than before. So, yes, our job is easier—except that the race generally goes faster now, so we're under a bit more pressure. Every year, there's new types of gears, new aluminium frames, new titanium frames, so it's getting more complex for us to offer neutral service. We have a list in the car of who is riding Mavic or Shimano or Campagnolo; the moment someone gets a flat tyre we need to think of a lot of things at once. Is it a titanium frame or a carbon frame or a steel frame?

== Controversies ==
=== 1907 ===
In 1907, Georges Passerieu broke away from a small leading group just before Douai because he knew he could not outsprint them if they all finished together. He was chased all the way to Roubaix by a Belgian, Cyrille van Hauwaert, and tension in the velodrome was high. The crowd heard that Passerieu had reached the stadium but nobody rode on to the track. The leader was just about to ride in when a gendarme stepped into his path to check if his bicycle had the obligatory tax plate attached to it. Passerieu had already had a hard day and a shouting match broke out before he was allowed to continue.

=== 1930 ===
In 1930, Jean Maréchal finished 24 seconds ahead of Belgian Julien Vervaecke but was moved to second because, while Maréchal was trying to pass Vervaecke, the Belgian tumbled into a ditch.According to some, Maréchal hit the Belgian's shoulder, causing his fall. Jacques Augendre, historian of the Tour de France, said Maréchal, who was 20, "was riding as an individual for a little bike-maker, Colin, and he got to Roubaix alone. His happiness was short-lived. Arbitrarily accused of having provoked a fall by Julien Vervaecke, with whom he had broken away, he was disqualified without any sort of hearing. Important detail: Vervaecke belonged to the all-powerful Alcyon team, run by the no less powerful Ludovic Feuillet..."

=== 1934 ===
In 1934 Roger Lapébie was disqualified for changing bicycles. Second placed rider Gaston Rebry was awarded the victory once officials discovered that Lapébie's bike was missing a race sticker.

=== 1936 ===
In 1936 the Belgian Romain Maes, appeared to win but judges declared Frenchman Georges Speicher the winner and Maes second. Shouting began in the stands and for a moment it looked as though fighting would start, but calm returned and the result was upheld. A Belgian may not have won but there were seven Belgians in the first ten.

=== 1949 ===
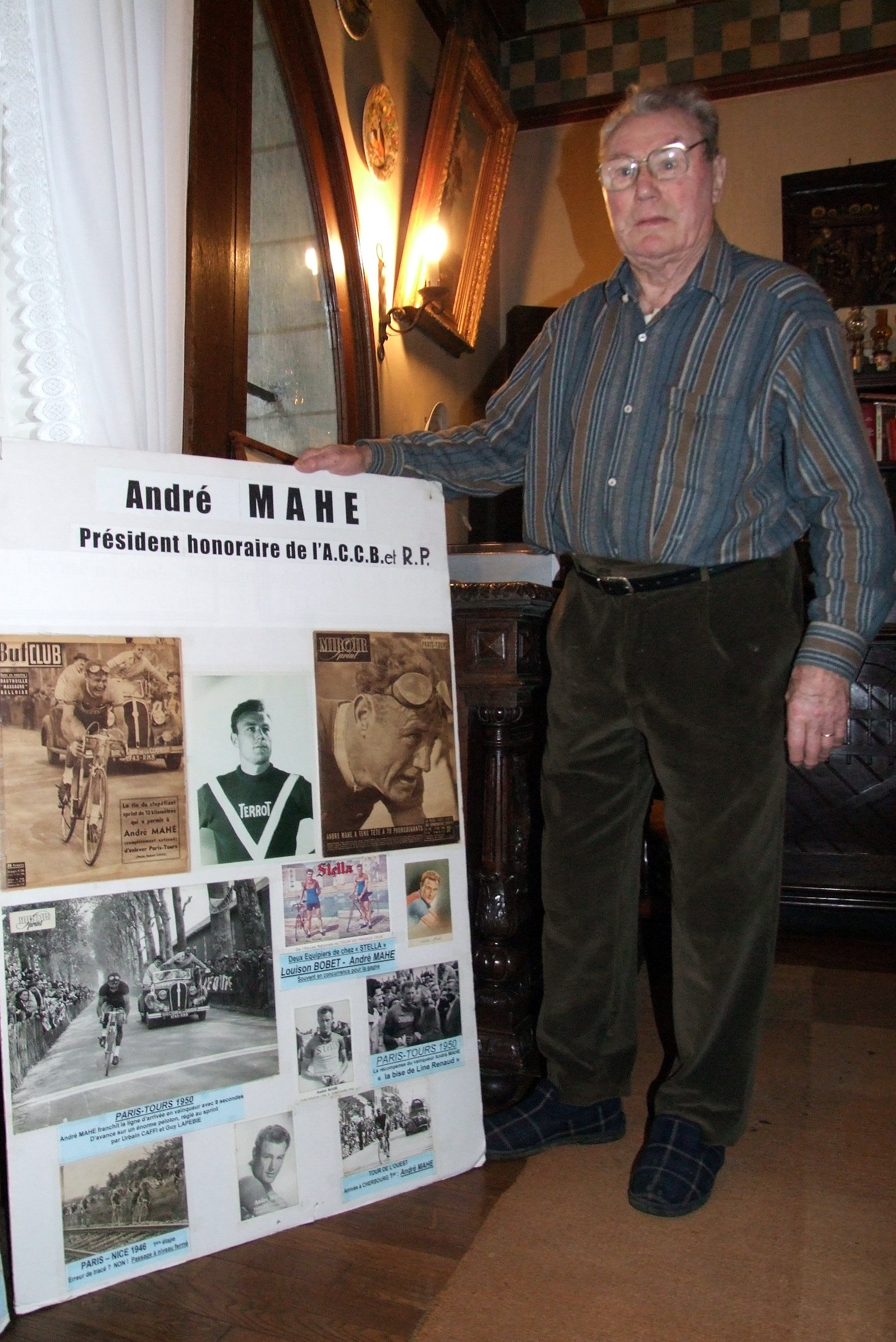
André Mahé in 2007

The result in 1949 took several months and two international conferences to sort out. André Mahé was first but his win was challenged because he took the wrong course. Mahé was in a break of three that reached Roubaix velodrome in the lead, but he was misdirected by officials and entered the track by the wrong gate. Mahé was declared winner but a few minutes later other riders arrived using the correct route and Serse Coppi, brother of famous Fausto, won the sprint for what was assumed to be the minor placings. After a protest and several months, Serse Coppi was named joint winner with Mahé. Mahé said in 2007:

C'est trop bête d'en parler (It's too stupid to talk about). There was a break. Coppi attacked. His brother Fausto gave him a push to get him away. He wanted his brother to win. I waited a bit and then I attacked and I caught him and the break. Then I went off by myself. I was going to win Paris–Roubaix. At the entrance to the vélodrome, there were crowds everywhere, blocking the way. I looked around for where to go and I was directed round the outside wall of the track, to where the team cars had to park. It wasn't like nowadays, when there's television and everything. Then it was more chaotic and the whole road was blocked. People said I should have known the way into the track. But how do you know a thing like that at the end of Paris–Roubaix, when you've raced all day over roads like that? A gendarme signalled the way to go and that's the way I went.

It was a journalist on a motorbike who managed to get up to me. He was shouting 'Not that way! Not that way!' And I turned round in the road and I rode back beneath the outside wall of the grandstand and I saw a gateway that went into the track, a gateway for journalists. And that's the way I went, except that it came out on the other side of the track from the proper entrance. The bunch came in and Serse won the sprint. But then his brother told Serse to go to the judges to object. He told Serse that I hadn't ridden the entire and precise course and that therefore I should be déclassé. But that was below him. Coppi wanted his brother to have a big victory. He was a great champion, Coppi, but to do what he did, to protest like that to get a victory for his brother, that wasn't dignified for a champion. That was below him. A champion like that should never have stooped that low. I never spoke to him about it. Never did. Why should I?

=== 1981 ===
In 1981 Bernard Hinault said after winning the race:

Paris–Roubaix est une connerie – "Paris–Roubaix is bullshit" or "Paris–Roubaix is plain stupid".

The only other times he rode it were in 1980, when he finished fourth, and in 1982, as the defending champion. When he was criticised, he said: "I don't go into offices and tell people to work harder, yet people ask me to be the strongest on the cobbles." Hinault fell seven times in that race, including 13 km from the finish when a small black dog called Gruson ran out in a bend and ran under his wheel. Hinault had been clear with Roger De Vlaeminck, Hennie Kuiper and Marc Demeyer. The incident made Hinault angry and he raced back to the others and won in Roubaix.

He was not the first star to refuse. Jacques Anquetil called it a lottery after puncturing 13 km from the end in 1958 and never took it seriously again.

In 2002 only two of the top 20 riders in the UCI table – Jens Voigt and Erik Zabel – were on the start line. The following year only Zabel was there. In 2004 he had stayed at home as well. Philippe Brunel wrote in L'Équipe:

We won't go as far as say that the five-time winner of the Tour [Hinault] – who every year gives the winner his celebration cobble stone on behalf of the organisers—has contributed to the impoverishment [paupérisation] of the queen of classics, which would offend him, but his words have contributed to the snub, or the indifference, of those who stay away. The fact isn't new but the phenomenon is getting worse and is concerning. The peloton of stayaways has grown to the point where Paris–Roubaix is now only for a tight group of specialists ... especially the Belgians, capable of maintaining high speed on the cobbles.

=== 1988 ===
During the1988 race, for the first time in 30 years an early morning breakaway group held on until the finish. 27 kilometres into the race, a group of unknown riders broke away. On a section of cobblestones outside Roubaix, Thomas Wegmüller (SUI) and Dirk Demol (BEL) broke away from the lead group. At the time, Wegmüller was ranked 175th in the world, and Demol was ranked just inside the top 500 cyclists.

When the two entered Roubaix, Wegmüller ran over a plastic bag that flew out in front of him, which became jammed in his derailleur. Wegmüller was unable to change gears, which was needed for a sprint finish. At this point, Demol chose not to attack but instead drafted behind Wegmüller as he got assistance from his team car to remove the bag. Most of the bag was removed, but some of it was still jammed and his gears still would not change. Opting out of a bicycle change, Wegmüller continued on his damaged bike and Demol continued to draft behind him until the final sprint, which allowed Demol to win the race.

Laurent Fignon finished third after a late breakaway from the chasing peloton. Sean Kelly, also part of the chase group containing the top riders in the world, crashed late in the race, after it was already decided the breakaway would not be caught and crossed the finish line with blood covering his face.

=== 2006 ===
In 2006 Leif Hoste, Peter Van Petegem and Vladimir Gusev were disqualified for riding through a closed railway level crossing 10 km before the finish and just ahead of an approaching freight train. Fabian Cancellara won and Tom Boonen and Alessandro Ballan were given the remaining places on the podium.

I know the rules, yes, but I don't understand why nobody stopped us, and why nothing was said to us in the 10 km that followed. All that just to be told two minutes before going to the podium that we had been disqualified. Cancellara deserved his victory but for me, I will always be in second place even though I have been disqualified.

— Leif Hoste, L'Équipe, April 2006.

It's crazy. In Belgium they would have stopped the train.

— Peter Van Petegem, April 2006

== Deaths ==
In the 2018 race, Michael Goolaerts (Vérandas Willems–Crelan) crashed after suffering a cardiac arrest 100 km into the race. A doctor attempted to resuscitate him on the spot. He was flown to hospital in Lille by helicopter for treatment. At 23:30 local time, his death was announced by his team.

His teammate back then, Wout van Aert, promised to honour Goolaerts when he would win the race. In 2026 he won the race and came over the line pointing to the sky, honouring his lost friend.

== Comments ==
=== Theo de Rooij ===
The American television channel CBS covered Paris–Roubaix in the 1980s. Theo de Rooij, a Dutchman, had been in a promising position to win the 1985 race but had then crashed, losing his chance of winning. Covered in mud, he offered his thoughts on the race to CBS' John Tesh after the race:

"It's a bollocks, this race!" said de Rooij. "You're working like an animal, you don't have time to piss, you wet your pants. You're riding in mud like this, you're slipping ... it's a pile of shit".

When then asked if he would start the race again, de Rooij replied:

"Sure, it's the most beautiful race in the world!"

Sean Kelly, a two-time winner of the event, one of the greatest Classics riders of all time, and a rider noted for his hardness and stoicism, referred on a number of occasions to his 'love-hate' relationship with 'the Hell of the North';

"A Paris–Roubaix without rain is not a true Paris–Roubaix. Throw in a little snow as well, it's not serious." – Sean Kelly

"Paris–Roubaix is a horrible race to ride but the most beautiful one to win." – Sean Kelly

"Thousands line the road in this annual rite of spring cheering their larger than life heroes. Urging, at times, even helping them victory. They ride in the tracks of bygone legends dreaming of distant fame and glory. But glory is not without a price.
These bloodied and battered warriors struggle through the rain, the cold, the mud, on roads better suited to oxen cart than bicycles. But for the victor there is glory, immortality and a place in history amongst the giants of the road.
Since 1896, the greatest bike racers on earth have come to test their very souls in this brutal and beautiful spectacle".

— CBS Sports – 1987

=== Other observations ===
- "Let me tell you, though—there's a huge difference between the Tour of Flanders and Paris–Roubaix. They're not even close to the same. In one, the cobbles are used every day by the cars, and kept up, and stuff like that. The other one—it's completely different ... The best I could do would be to describe it like this—they plowed a dirt road, flew over it with a helicopter, and then just dropped a bunch of rocks out of the helicopter! That's Paris–Roubaix. It's that bad—it's ridiculous." – Chris Horner
- "This is a race that suits me when I'm having a good day. On the other hand, if you don't have the legs, this is the worst place you could possibly be." – Jo Planckaert, 2004
- "It's a circus, and I don't want to be one of the clowns." – Chris Boardman (speaking before the start on British Eurosport).
- "I think it’s just a culmination of everything that a cyclist needs: they need to be skilful, they need to be strong, they need to have mental toughness and tactical awareness. That’s why I love it: because it’s more than just being the strongest bike rider. There are winners who puncture or crash, but you need it to go more right for you than anyone else, I suppose. It’s just never over until it’s over." - Lizzie Deignan, 2021
- "Everybody has his own story during the race. When I get back to the bus I will hear the stories of my teammates and some stories come together and I start to understand what happened. It's the beauty of the race." – Wout van Aert, 2022

== Les Amis de Paris–Roubaix ==
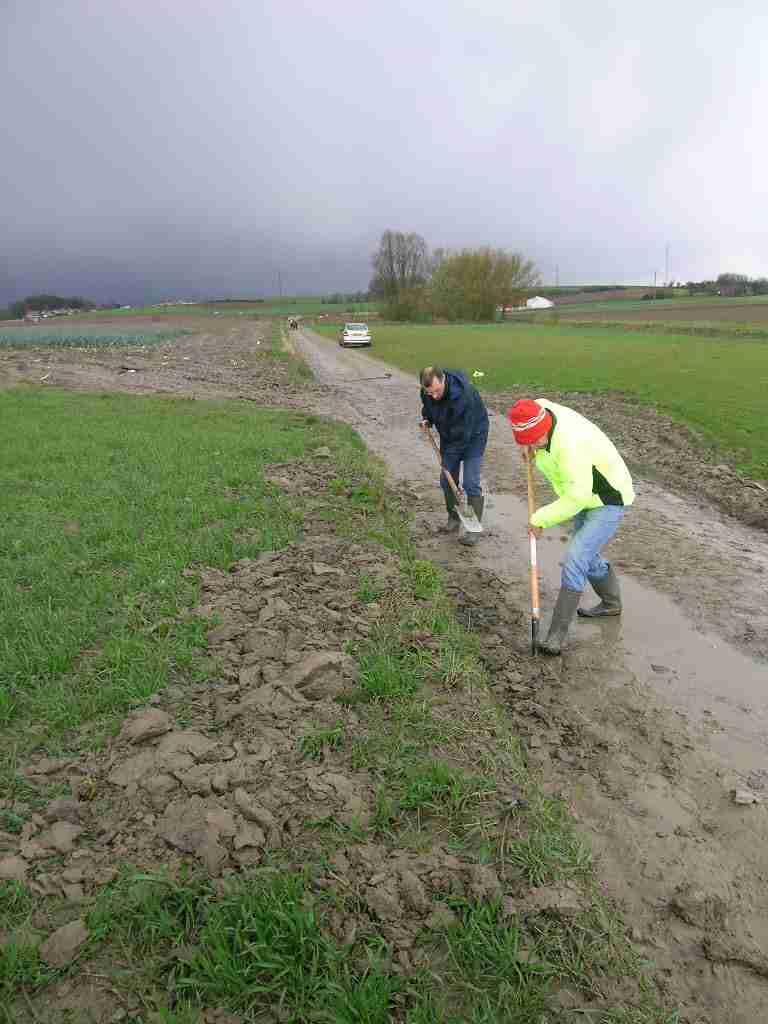
'Les forçats du pavé' working at Mons en Pévèle

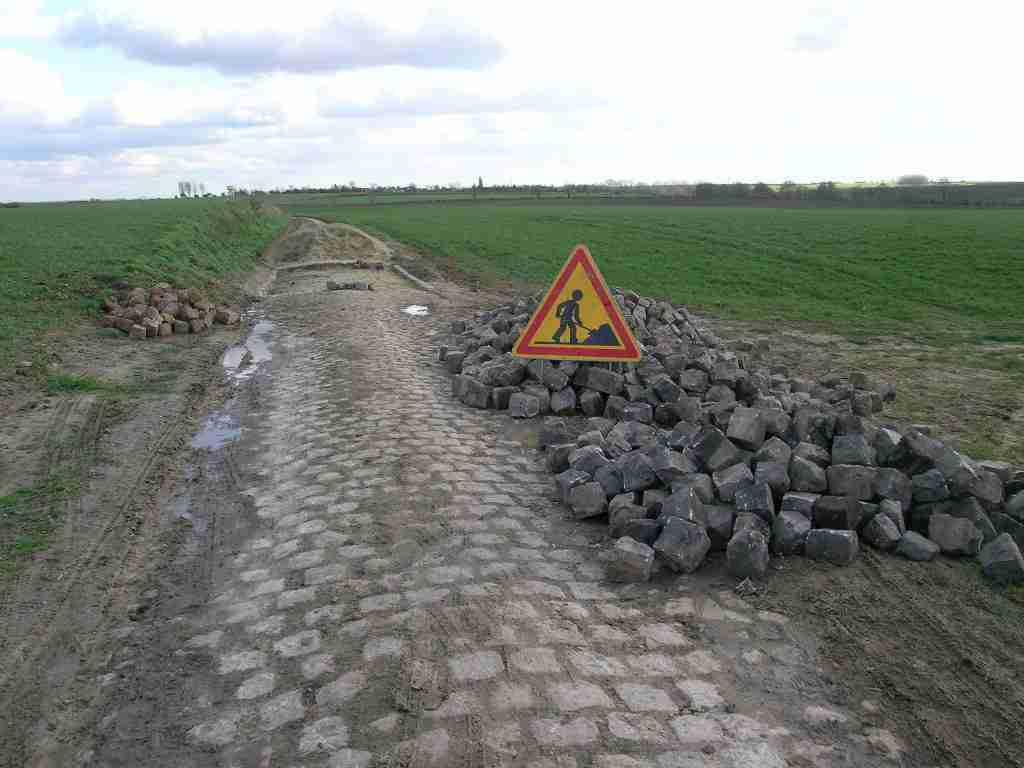
Pavé under repair by Les Amis de Paris–Roubaix

Les Amis de Paris–Roubaix – the "friends" of the race – is an enthusiasts' group founded by Jean-Claude Vallaeys in 1983. It is based in France but open to members all over the world. It has its roots in the Paris–Roubaix Cyclo-Touriste of 1972. By 1982 there were 7,242 participants. There and at other events on the course, a petition calling for the cobbles to be saved gathered 10,000 signatures. Jean-Claude Valleys, Jean-François Pescheux (Note: Jean-François Pescheux is now the organiser of Paris–Roubaix) and the Vélo-club de Roubaix, which Vallaeys founded in 1966, formed Les Amis de Paris–Roubaix in 1982 at a photo exhibition at the Maison du Nord-Pas de Calais (Note: La Maison is a combination of chamber of commerce, lobbying organisation and tourist office.) in Paris.

Its aim was to find enough stretches of cobbled road to preserve the nature of the race. So many roads had been resurfaced that, as the organiser said, there was a risk that it would become a fast race on smooth roads won by sprinters rather than those who had fought through hell. Alain Bernard, who succeeded Vallaeys, says: "We have succeeded in that. Today, the association looks after the maintenance of these paths of legend, working with local administrations to preserve them. But alongside that, we also do other things to preserve the value of the race, building up an impressive collection of documents, holding exhibitions, honouring former winners, holding tours of the route."

Les Amis said in 2007 that it was too late to save the sector of Bersée, which was removed from the race because of its dangerous state in 2007, but restored two years later. The situation is becoming critical, it says, at the Pont Gibus at Wallers, at Mons-en-Pévèle, Pont Thibaut at Ennevelin, the pavé of the Duclos-Lassalle section at Cysoing, and at Camphin-en-Pévèle.

"Their disappearance would be a fatal blow to the Queen of Classics", says the association.

=== Les forçats du pavé ===
The weather is often bad for the riders; it is frequently worse for the forçats du pavé (literally 'convicts of the cobbles'), as they call themselves (Note: 'Les forçats du pavé' is a reference to a newspaper article and book by Albert Londres which described the toiling riders of the Tour de France as the forçats or forced labourers de la route.) In March 2008, "Les Amis" published an account of their work thus:

Saturday 22 March: a cold wind sweeps the plain of Pévèle; alternating showers of hail, melted snow and cold rain. Not a day to venture outside... Nevertheless, at the foot of the Mons-en-Pévèle ridge, silhouettes busy themselves along the soaked cobble roadway. Backs bent against the gusts, they tirelessly scratch at the ground with primitive tools. Who are these dozen souls—A work-gang from a byegone era? Automatons? Treasure-hunters?

No, these are members of the "Amis de Paris Roubaix", trying to clean off the mud and crusted earth left on the cobbles by farm work. They are on an important section of Paris–Roubaix and, without their intervention, the greatest of cycling classics, due to be held in only a few days, will not be able to come through... And without these cobbled routes, the Paris–Roubaix would disappear, depriving the whole world of one of sport's most intense and gripping events. This they know, and they'll be back again the two weekends before the race, far from the media and officials who will soon bustle here.

The passion that drives them is much stronger than the bad weather. It has nothing to do with the current storms in the cycling world. These discreet servants of the "Queen of the Classics" have only one ambition—to clean the stones so that when the day comes for the champion to be crowned they can hold their cobbled trophy high.

== Winners and records ==
=== Winners by year ===
Year	Country	Rider	Team
1896	Germany	Josef Fischer	Diamant
1897	Italy	Maurice Garin	–
1898	Italy	Maurice Garin	–
1899	France	Albert Champion	–
1900	France	Émile Bouhours	–
1901	France	Lucien Lesna	–
1902	France	Lucien Lesna	–
1903	France	Hippolyte Aucouturier	Peugeot
1904	France	Hippolyte Aucouturier	Peugeot
1905	France	Louis Trousselier	Peugeot–Wolber
1906	France	Henri Cornet	–
1907	France	Georges Passerieu	Peugeot–Wolber
1908	Belgium	Cyrille van Hauwaert	Alcyon–Dunlop
1909	France	Octave Lapize	Biguet–Dunlop
1910	France	Octave Lapize	Alcyon–Dunlop
1911	France	Octave Lapize	La Française–Diamant
1912	France	Charles Crupelandt	La Française–Diamant
1913	Luxembourg	François Faber	Peugeot–Wolber
1914	France	Charles Crupelandt	La Française–Hutchinson
1915	No race due to World War I		
1916	No race due to World War I		
1917	No race due to World War I		
1918	No race due to World War I		
1919	France	Henri Pélissier	La Sportive
1920	Belgium	Paul Deman	La Sportive
1921	France	Henri Pélissier	La Sportive
1922	Belgium	Albert Dejonghe	La Française
1923	Switzerland	Heiri Suter	Gurtner–Hutchinson
1924	Belgium	Jules van Hevel	Wonder–Russell
1925	Belgium	Félix Sellier	Alcyon–Dunlop
1926	Belgium	Julien Delbecque	Alcyon–Dunlop
1927	Belgium	Georges Ronsse	Automoto
1928	France	André Leducq	Alcyon–Dunlop
1929	Belgium	Charles Meunier	La Française–Diamant–Dunlop
1930	Belgium	Julien Vervaecke	Alcyon–Dunlop
1931	Belgium	Gaston Rebry	Alcyon–Dunlop
1932	Belgium	Romain Gijssels	Dilecta–Wolber
1933	Belgium	Sylvère Maes	Alcyon–Dunlop
1934	Belgium	Gaston Rebry	Alcyon–Dunlop
1935	Belgium	Gaston Rebry	Alcyon–Dunlop
1936	France	Georges Speicher	Alcyon–Dunlop
1937	Italy	Jules Rossi	Alcyon–Dunlop
1938	Belgium	Lucien Storme	Mercier–Hutchinson
1939	Belgium	Émile Masson Jr.	Alcyon–Dunlop
1940	No race due to World War II		
1941	No race due to World War II		
1942	No race due to World War II		
1943	Belgium	Marcel Kint	Mercier–Hutchinson
1944	Belgium	Maurice Desimpelaere	Alcyon–Dunlop
1945	France	Paul Maye	Alcyon–Dunlop
1946	Belgium	Georges Claes	Rochet–Dunlop
1947	Belgium	Georges Claes	Rochet–Dunlop
1948	Belgium	Rik Van Steenbergen	Mercier–Hutchinson
1949	France	André Mahé (victory shared with Serse Coppi)	Stella–Dunlop
1949	Italy	Serse Coppi (victory shared with André Mahé)	Bianchi–Ursus
1950	Italy	Fausto Coppi	Bianchi–Pirelli
1951	Italy	Antonio Bevilacqua	Benotto–Ursus
1952	Belgium	Rik Van Steenbergen	Mercier–Hutchinson
1953	Belgium	Germain Derycke	Alcyon–Dunlop
1954	Belgium	Raymond Impanis	Mercier–BP–Hutchinson
1955	France	Jean Forestier	Follis–Dunlop
1956	France	Louison Bobet	Mercier–BP–Hutchinson
1957	Belgium	Fred De Bruyne	Carpano–Coppi
1958	Belgium	Leon Vandaele	Faema–Guerra
1959	Belgium	Noël Foré	Groene Leeuw–Sinalco–SAS
1960	Belgium	Pino Cerami	Peugeot–BP–Dunlop
1961	Belgium	Rik Van Looy	Faema
1962	Belgium	Rik Van Looy	Flandria–Faema–Clément
1963	Belgium	Emile Daems	Peugeot–BP–Englebert
1964	Netherlands	Peter Post	Flandria–Romeo
1965	Belgium	Rik Van Looy	Solo–Superia
1966	Italy	Felice Gimondi	Salvarani
1967	Netherlands	Jan Janssen	Pelforth–Sauvage–Lejeune
1968	Belgium	Eddy Merckx	Faema
1969	Belgium	Walter Godefroot	Flandria–De Clerck–Krüger
1970	Belgium	Eddy Merckx	Faemino–Faema
1971	Belgium	Roger Rosiers	Bic
1972	Belgium	Roger De Vlaeminck	Dreher
1973	Belgium	Eddy Merckx	Molteni
1974	Belgium	Roger De Vlaeminck	Brooklyn
1975	Belgium	Roger De Vlaeminck	Brooklyn
1976	Belgium	Marc Demeyer	Flandria–Velda–West Vlaams Vleesbedrijf
1977	Belgium	Roger De Vlaeminck	Brooklyn
1978	Italy	Francesco Moser	Sanson–Campagnolo
1979	Italy	Francesco Moser	Sanson–Luxor TV–Campagnolo
1980	Italy	Francesco Moser	Sanson–Campagnolo
1981	France	Bernard Hinault	Renault–Elf–Gitane
1982	Netherlands	Jan Raas	TI–Raleigh–Campagnolo
1983	Netherlands	Hennie Kuiper	J. Aernoudt–Rossin
1984	Ireland	Sean Kelly	Skil–Reydel–Sem–Mavic
1985	France	Marc Madiot	Renault–Elf
1986	Ireland	Sean Kelly	Kas
1987	Belgium	Eric Vanderaerden	Panasonic–Isostar
1988	Belgium	Dirk Demol	AD Renting–Mini-Flat–Enerday
1989	Belgium	Jean-Marie Wampers	Panasonic–Isostar–Colnago–Agu
1990	Belgium	Eddy Planckaert	Panasonic–Sportlife
1991	France	Marc Madiot	RMO
1992	France	Gilbert Duclos-Lassalle	Z
1993	France	Gilbert Duclos-Lassalle	GAN
1994	Moldova	Andrei Tchmil	Lotto
1995	Italy	Franco Ballerini	Mapei–GB–Latexco
1996	Belgium	Johan Museeuw	Mapei–GB
1997	France	Frédéric Guesdon	Française des Jeux
1998	Italy	Franco Ballerini	Mapei–Bricobi
1999	Italy	Andrea Tafi	Mapei–Quick-Step
2000	Belgium	Johan Museeuw	Mapei–Quick-Step
2001	Netherlands	Servais Knaven	Domo–Farm Frites–Latexco
2002	Belgium	Johan Museeuw	Domo–Farm Frites
2003	Belgium	Peter Van Petegem	Lotto–Domo
2004	Sweden	Magnus Bäckstedt	Alessio–Bianchi
2005	Belgium	Tom Boonen	Quick-Step–Innergetic
2006	Switzerland	Fabian Cancellara	Team CSC
2007	Australia	Stuart O'Grady	Team CSC
2008	Belgium	Tom Boonen	Quick-Step
2009	Belgium	Tom Boonen	Quick-Step
2010	Switzerland	Fabian Cancellara	Team Saxo Bank
2011	Belgium	Johan Vansummeren	Garmin–Cervélo
2012	Belgium	Tom Boonen	Omega Pharma–Quick-Step
2013	Switzerland	Fabian Cancellara	RadioShack–Leopard
2014	Netherlands	Niki Terpstra	Omega Pharma–Quick-Step
2015	Germany	John Degenkolb	Team Giant–Alpecin
2016	Australia	Mathew Hayman	Orica–GreenEDGE
2017	Belgium	Greg Van Avermaet	BMC Racing Team
2018	Slovakia	Peter Sagan	Bora–Hansgrohe
2019	Belgium	Philippe Gilbert	Deceuninck–Quick-Step
2020	No race due to the COVID-19 pandemic		
2021	Italy	Sonny Colbrelli	Team Bahrain Victorious
2022	Netherlands	Dylan van Baarle	INEOS Grenadiers
2023	Netherlands	Mathieu van der Poel	Alpecin–Deceuninck
2024	Netherlands	Mathieu van der Poel	Alpecin–Deceuninck
2025	Netherlands	Mathieu van der Poel	Alpecin–Deceuninck
2026	Belgium	Wout van Aert	Visma–Lease a Bike

=== Wins per country ===
Wins	Country
58	Belgium
28	France
14	Italy
10	Netherlands
4	Switzerland
2	Australia; Germany; Ireland
1	Luxembourg; Moldova; Slovakia; Sweden

=== Most individual victories ===
4 wins

- (Belgium) Roger De Vlaeminck (1972, 1974, 1975, 1977)
- (Belgium) Tom Boonen (2005, 2008, 2009, 2012)

3 wins

- (France) Octave Lapize (1909, 1910, 1911)
- (Belgium) Gaston Rebry (1931, 1934, 1935)
- (Belgium) Rik Van Looy (1961, 1962, 1965)
- (Belgium) Eddy Merckx (1968, 1970, 1973)
- (Italy) Francesco Moser (1978, 1979, 1980)
- (Belgium) Johan Museeuw (1996, 2000, 2002)
- (Switzerland) Fabian Cancellara (2006, 2010, 2013)
- (Netherlands) Mathieu van der Poel (2023, 2024, 2025)

2 wins (11)

- (Italy) Maurice Garin (1897, 1898)
- (France) Lucien Lesna (1901, 1902)
- (France) Hippolyte Aucouturier (1903, 1904)
- (France) Charles Crupelandt (1912, 1914)
- (France) Henri Pélissier (1919, 1921)
- (Belgium) Georges Claes (1946, 1947)
- (Belgium) Rik Van Steenbergen (1948, 1952)
- (Republic of Ireland) Sean Kelly (1984, 1986)
- (France) Marc Madiot (1985, 1991)
- (France) Gilbert Duclos-Lassalle (1992, 1993)
- (Italy) Franco Ballerini (1995, 1998)

=== Fastest editions ===
Rider	Avg. speed	Year	Distance
Wout Van Aert (BEL)	48.91 km/h (30.39 mph)	2026	258.3 km (160.5 mi)
Mathieu van der Poel (NED)	47.80 km/h (29.70 mph)	2024	259.7 km (161.4 mi)
Mathieu van der Poel (NED)	46.92 km/h (29.16 mph)	2025	259.2 km (161.1 mi)
Mathieu van der Poel (NED)	46.84 km/h (29.11 mph)	2023	256.6 km (159.4 mi)
Dylan van Baarle (NED)	45.79 km/h (28.45 mph)	2022	257.2 km (159.8 mi)
Greg Van Avermaet (BEL)	45.20 km/h (28.09 mph)	2017	257.0 km (159.7 mi)
Peter Post (NED)	45.13 km/h (28.04 mph)	1964	265.0 km (164.7 mi)
Fabian Cancellara (SUI)	44.19 km/h (27.46 mph)	2013	254.5 km (158.1 mi)
Rik Van Steenbergen (BEL)	43.99 km/h (27.33 mph)	1948	246 km (153 mi)
Mathew Hayman (AUS)	43.91 km/h (27.28 mph)	2016	257.5 km (160.0 mi)

- The record held by Peter Post, was set on the pre-1968 course, which contained far fewer cobbles.

=== Other records ===
- Most races completed by a rider – 16, by Raymond Impanis (1947–1963), Servais Knaven (1995–2010), and Mathew Hayman (2000–2001, 2003, 2005–2006, 2008–2018). – 15, Gilbert Duclos-Lassalle,
- Most races (completed and not completed) – 18, by Raymond Poulidor (1960–1977, best result: 5th in 1962)
- Oldest winner – Gilbert Duclos-Lassalle, 38 years and 8 months in 1993.
- Largest winning margin (postwar) – 5 minutes and 21 seconds, when Eddy Merckx beat Roger De Vlaeminck in 1970.
- Closest margin of victory – 1 cm (0.39 in), between Eddy Planckaert and Steve Bauer in 1990.
- Slowest victory – 12 hours and 15 minutes, in 1919 when Henri Pélissier won on roads devastated by World War I.
- Longest victorious break – 222 km (138 mi), by Dirk Demol and Thomas Wegmüller in 1988.
- Longest solo victorious break – 60 km (37 mi), by Andrei Tchmil in 1994 and Mathieu van der Poel in 2024

== Other cobbled races ==
Paris–Roubaix is sometimes compared to the other famous cobbled race, the Tour of Flanders in Belgium. Paris–Roubaix is flatter and has more difficult cobbles while the Tour of Flanders contains a series of hills, many on cobbles, like the Koppenberg or Kapelmuur.

In addition to Paris–Roubaix and the Tour of Flanders, called the cobbled classics, other spring races like Omloop Het Nieuwsblad and Gent–Wevelgem feature extensive cobbles.

Winners of Paris–Roubaix and Tour of Flanders (in the same year)
Rider	Year
Heiri Suter (SUI)	1923
Romain Gijssels (BEL)	1932
Gaston Rebry (BEL)	1934
Raymond Impanis (BEL)	1954
Fred De Bruyne (BEL)	1957
Rik Van Looy (BEL)	1962
Roger De Vlaeminck (BEL)	1977
Peter Van Petegem (BEL)	2003
Tom Boonen (BEL)	2005
Fabian Cancellara (SUI)	2010
Tom Boonen (BEL)	2012
Fabian Cancellara (SUI)	2013
Mathieu van der Poel (NED)	2024

== Related events ==
The U23 Paris–Roubaix or Paris–Roubaix Espoirs is raced in the early summer.

The Paris–Roubaix Cyclo is organised by the Velo Club de Roubaix every other June. This allows amateurs to experience the cobbles, the finishing laps in the vélodrome, and the showers. There is a choice of three levels: 120 km, most of the cobbled sectors; 190 km all the cobbles; or the full 261 km. All finishers receive a small cobblestone on a wooden plinth. The Paris–Roubaix Skoda Classic Challenge is organised the day before the pro race in April.

From 2021, Paris–Roubaix Femmes – a professional women's race in the UCI Women's World Tour – has been held on Saturday, with the men's race taking place on the Sunday. It follows the same terrain as the men's race, albeit over a shorter distance.

In the United States, there are several examples of races or sportives over difficult or mixed terrain that are referred to by the name "Roubaix", for example the Barry-Roubaix (which rhymes with Paris–Roubaix in French), the Rouge Roubaix, and the Brandywine Valley Roubaix.

== Bibliography ==
- Philippe Bouvet, Pierre Callewaert, Jean-Luc Gatellier, Laget Serge: Paris–Roubaix: A Journey Through Hell (ISBN 1934030090), VeloPress, 2007. The inside story of the race, its great riders, its traditions, and its secrets.
- Also in German: Paris–Roubaix. Die Hölle des Nordens. Delius Klasing, Bielefeld 2011, ISBN 978-3-7688-3268-7.
