= André Mahé =

French cyclist

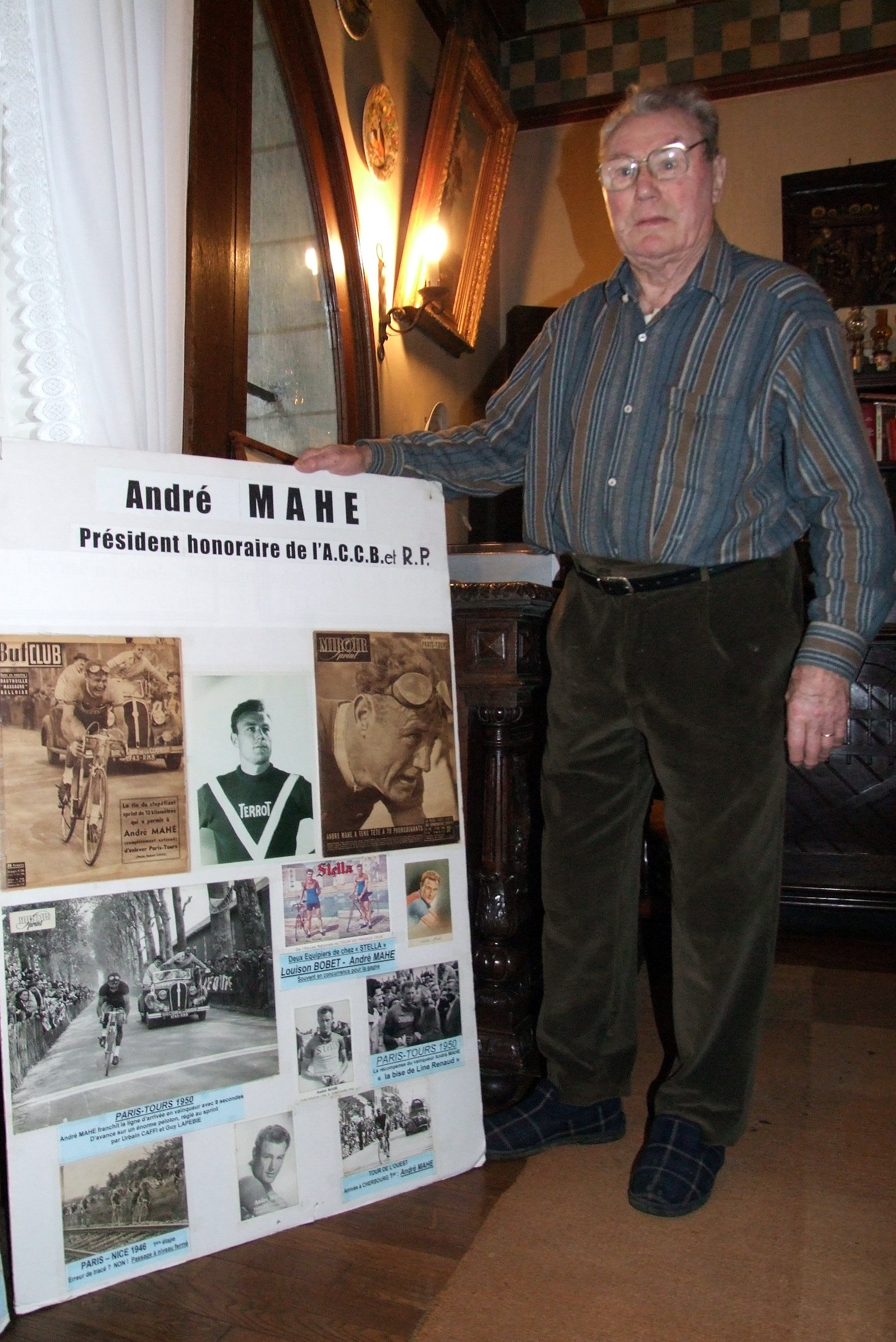
- Mahé in 2007

Personal information
- Full name: André Mahé
- Born: 18 November 1919 Paris, France
- Died: 19 October 2010 (aged 90)

Cycling career
- Sport: Cycling
- Discipline: Road
- Role: Rider
- Rider type: Classics specialist

Professional teams
- 1946–1947: Metropole-Dunlop
- 1948–1950: Stella-Dunlop
- 1951–1952: Terrot
- 1953: Peugeot-Dunlop
- 1954: Royal Codrix

Major wins
- Paris–Roubaix (1949); Paris–Tours (1950)

André Mahé (18 November 1919 – 19 October 2010) was a French road bicycle racer. He was born in Paris, France. He was a professional rider from 1945 until 1954. He jointly won the 1949 classic cycle race Paris–Roubaix with Serse Coppi in controversial fashion. In 1950 he won the classic Paris–Tours race.

== Major results ==
1946
1st Tour du Finistère
3rd Grand Prix des Nations
1947
3rd Circuit de l'Aulne
1st stage 1, Tour de l'Ouest
2nd stage 1, Tour de France
1948
1st Circuit "Maine-Normandie-Anjou"
2nd Paris-Nantes
2nd Tour de l'Ouest
3rd Grand Prix du Pneumatique à Montluçon
1949
1st Paris–Roubaix (jointly with Serse Coppi)
1st Grand Prix de l'Equipe
1950
1st Paris–Tours
2nd Grand Prix de "L'Echo d'Alger"
1951
1st Grand Prix de "L'Echo d'Alger"
2nd Paris-Saint Amand-Montrond
1952
1st Circuit des Deux-Ponts à Montluçon
3rd Paris–Roubaix
1953
1st Montsauche
3rd Boucles de la Gartempe (1st on stage 3)
3rd Grand Prix du Maine
1954
1st Montsauche
1st Hennebont

== The story of the 1949 Paris–Roubaix ==
The result of the 1949 Paris–Roubaix took several months and two international conferences to sort out. André Mahé was first across the line, but his win was challenged on the grounds that he took the wrong course.

Mahé was in a break of three riders that reached the Roubaix Velodrome in the lead, but was misdirected by officials. Mahé, Jacques Moujica and Frans Leenen were desperate to get inside the stadium and cross the finish line before the next riders arrived. Moujica damaged his bike in the process, but Mahé and Leenen got into the stadium by a back door. André Mahé was first and was awarded the race. Or so it seemed.

Mahé acknowledged the crowds, took the bouquet, did a lap of honour and then headed to clean himself up at the track's showers.

A few minutes later the bunch arrived using the correct route and Serse Coppi, brother of the more famous Fausto, won the sprint for what was assumed to be, the minor placings. When the Coppi brothers heard about Mahé's unconventional approach to the finish they protested, demanding he be disqualified or demoted and that Serse be named as the winner.

The judges changed their minds and awarded Coppi the race. Five days later the French federation confirmed Mahé as the winner. The Italian federation then protested to the Union Cycliste Internationale and the dispute became international. The UCI's response (in August 1949) was to declare the race null - no winner. However, they agreed to review their decision at a conference in November of that year.

In November the Belgian federation sided with the Italians. After much internal politicking a compromise was reached. The final outcome - to reinstate the race and declare André Mahé and Serse Coppi as joint winners - was not popular with either side. The race was Serse Coppi's only classic win.

In a 2007 interview, André Mahé still maintained that he should have been awarded the race. He said of Fausto Coppi: "Coppi wanted his brother to have a big victory. He was a great champion, Coppi, but to do what he did - to protest like that to get a victory for his brother - that wasn't dignified for a champion. That was beneath him."

== Other results ==
Mahé made his mark in the professional peloton in his second year, 1946, by winning the Tour du Finistère and coming third in the classic Grand Prix des Nations time trial. He finished the Tour de France only once (in 1949), finishing 49th.

After his win at Roubaix he went on to win the classic Paris–Tours race the next year (1950). In 1952 he came third in Paris–Roubaix despite puncturing and having to change his tyre during the race.

He retired from racing in 1955.

== Retirement ==
After retiring from cycling he went to work for his father-in-law's cable-making company in Paris. When the company moved to Compiègne in northern France (coincidentally, now the starting point of the Paris–Roubaix) he relocated to that area. After retiring he cut most of his links with cycling, apart from attending the Paris–Roubaix as a guest.

== Bibliography ==
- Woodland, L. "Share Deal" - an interview with André Mahé about the 1949 Paris–Roubaix in Procycling Issue 97, April 2007
