= Serse Coppi =

Italian cyclist

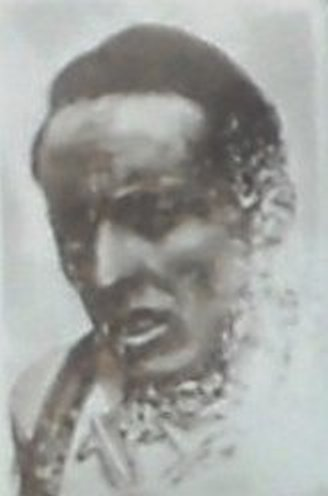

Personal information
- Full name: Serse Coppi
- Born: 19 March 1923 Castellania, Italy
- Died: 29 June 1951 (aged 28) Turin, Italy

Cycling career
- Sport: Cycling
- Discipline: Road
- Role: Rider

Major wins
- One-day races and Classics Paris–Roubaix (1949)

Serse Coppi (19 March 1923 – 29 June 1951) was an Italian professional road racing cyclist born in Castellania. He was the younger brother of Italian cyclist Fausto Coppi.

== Professional career ==
His greatest victory was 1949 Paris–Roubaix, when he was placed equal winner with André Mahé after controversy. He died in 1951 after crashing in the final sprint of the Giro del Piemonte, when his wheel was caught in the tracks of the Turin tramway. He was 28. The British weekly, The Bicycle, reported: "The two brothers were still with the main bunch a kilometre from the end of the 272 km race. Fausto was not moving with his usual smoothness and Serse was by his side with words of encouragement. Then three riders crashed, but only one of them did not continue the race – Serse Coppi. He was actually able to ride to his hotel, and it was not believed that he was seriously hurt. But he was subsequently taken to hospital, where concussion of the brain was diagnosed. He died in Fausto's arms before an operation could be performed."
