= 1950 Paris–Tours =

Cycling Race

Race details
- Dates: 7 May 1950
- Stages: 1
- Distance: 251 km (156.0 mi)
- Winning time: 6h 20' 55"

Results
	Winner	André Mahé (FRA)
	Second	Urbain Caffi (FRA)
	Third	Guy Lapébie (FRA)

The 1950 Paris–Tours was the 44th edition of the Paris–Tours cycle race and was held on 7 May 1950. The race started in Paris and finished in Tours. The race was won by André Mahé.

== General classification ==
Final general classification

Rank	Rider	Time
1	André Mahé (FRA)	6h 20' 55"
2	Urbain Caffi (FRA)	+ 8"
3	Guy Lapébie (FRA)	+ 8"
4	Jean Bogaerts (BEL)	+ 8"
5	Émile Idée (FRA)	+ 8"
6	Roger Queugnet (FRA)	+ 8"
7	Galliano Pividori (ITA)	+ 8"
8	Robert Desbats (FRA)	+ 8"
9	Alphonse De Vreese (FRA)	+ 8"
10	Jean Lauk (FRA)	+ 8"
