= Giro della Provincia di Reggio Calabria =

Road bicycle race in Italy

Race details
- Date: Late January/Early February (Prior to 2023); April (2023–)
- Region: Metropolitan City of Reggio Calabria, Italy
- English name: Tour of the province of Reggio Calabria
- Local name: Giro della Provincia di Reggio Calabria (in Italian)
- Discipline: Road
- Competition: UCI Europe Tour
- Type: One-day race
- Web site: www.sc1917girodicalabria.it

History
- First edition: 1920
- Editions: 67 (as of 2025)
- First winner: Mario Giorgianni (ITA)
- Most wins: Michele Dancelli (ITA) (3 wins)
- Most recent: Luca Colnaghi (ITA)

The Giro della Provincia di Reggio Calabria, currently known as the Giro della Città Metropolitana di Reggio Calabria, is a road bicycle race held annually in the Metropolitan City of Reggio Calabria, Italy. The race was a single-day race until 2005. It was not held in 2006 or 2007, but returned in 2008 as a three-day stage race. In 2009, the Giro was again held as a single-day race, and in 2010, it was a stage race spanning four days. In 2011, it was again a three-day race, while in 2012, the race spanned two days, and has been held as a single-day race since its revival in 2023.

== Winners ==
Year	Country	Rider	Team
1920	Italy	Mario Giorgianni	individual
1921	No race		
1922	Italy	Angelo De Francesco	individual
1923	Italy	Nello Ciaccheri	Bianchi
1924; 1925	No race		
1926	Italy	Nello Ciaccheri	Legnano-Pirelli
1927	No race		
1928	Italy	Felice Gremo	Legnano-Torpedo
1929	Italy	Felice Gremo	Ideor
1930	Italy	Luigi Marchisio	Legnano-Pirelli
1931	Italy	Learco Guerra	Maino-Clément
1932; 1944	No race		
1945	Italy	Giovanni Corrieri	Viscontea
1946; 1948	No race		
1949	Italy	Sergio Pagliazzi	Atala–Pirelli
1950	Italy	Fausto Coppi	Bianchi–Ursus
1951	Italy	Luciano Maggini	Atala–Pirelli
1952	Italy	Gino Bartali	Bartali–Ursus
1953	Italy	Luciano Maggini	Atala–Pirelli
1954	Italy	Giuseppe Minardi	Legnano
1955	Italy	Rino Benedetti	Leo–Chlorodont
1956	Italy	Giuseppe Minardi	Leo–Chlorodont
1957	Italy	Gastone Nencini	Leo–Chlorodont
1958	Italy	Angelo Conterno	Carpano
1959	Italy	Waldemaro Bartolozzi	Ignis–Fréjus
1960	Italy	Guido Carlesi	Philco
1961	Italy	Dino Bruni	Ignis
1962	Italy	Luigi Sarti	Ghigi
1963	Italy	Ercole Baldini	Cynar–Fréjus
1964	Italy	Diego Ronchini	Cynar–Fréjus
1965	Italy	Adriano Durante	Ignis
1966	Italy	Michele Dancelli	Molteni
1967	Italy	Michele Dancelli	Vittadello
1968	Italy	Michele Dancelli	Pepsi-Cola
1969	Italy	Vittorio Adorni	Scic
1970	Belgium	Walter Godefroot	Salvarani
1971	Italy	Gianni Motta	Salvarani
1972	Italy	Franco Bitossi	Filotex
1973	Italy	Wladimiro Panizza	G.B.C.-Sony
1974	Italy	Francesco Moser	Filotex
1975	Italy	Giuseppe Perletto	Magniflex
1976	Italy	Enrico Paolini	Scic
1977	Italy	Costante Conti	Zonca-Santini
1978	Norway	Knut Knudsen	Bianchi-Faema
1979	Italy	Giovanni Battaglin	Inoxpran
1980	Italy	Gianbattista Baronchelli	Bianchi-Piaggio
1981	Italy	Alfio Vandi	Selle San Marco
1982	Italy	Riccardo Magrini	Metauro Mobili-Pinarello
1983	Italy	Pierino Gavazzi	Atala-Campagnolo
1984	Italy	Alfredo Chinetti	Supermercati Brianzoli
1985	Italy	Silvano Ricco	Dromedario-Laminox-Fibok
1986	Italy	Guido Bontempi	Carrera–Inoxpran
1987	Switzerland	Tony Rominger	Supermercati Brianzoli-Châteaux d'Ax
1988	Italy	Moreno Argentin	Gewiss-Bianchi
1989	Italy	Adriano Baffi	Ariostea
1990	Italy	Giuseppe Saronni	Diana-Colnago
1991	Italy	Andrea Ferrigato	Ariostea
1992	Italy	Davide Cassani	Ariostea
1993	Italy	Fabiano Fontanelli	Navigare–Blue Storm
1994	No race		
1995	Switzerland	Pascal Richard	MG Maglificio–Technogym
1996	Italy	Michele Bartoli	MG Maglificio–Technogym
1997	No race		
1998	Italy	Michele Bartoli	Asics–CGA
1999– 2002	No race		
2003	Spain	Aitor González	Fassa Bortolo
2004	Latvia	Andris Naudužs	De Nardi–Piemme Telekom
2005	Argentina	Guillermo Bongiorno	Ceramica Panaria–Navigare
2006– 2007	No race		
2008	Italy	Daniele Pietropolli	LPR Brakes–Ballan
2009	Italy	Fortunato Baliani	CSF Group–Navigare
2010	Italy	Matteo Montaguti	De Rosa–Stac Plastic
2011	Italy	Daniele Pietropolli	Lampre–ISD
2012	Italy	Elia Viviani	Liquigas–Cannondale
2013– 2022	No race		
2023	Colombia	Jhonatan Restrepo	GW Shimano–Sidermec
2024	No race		
2025	Italy	Luca Colnaghi	VF Group–Bardiani–CSF–Faizanè
2026	No race		
