= 1955 Giro d'Italia =

Race details
- Dates: 14 May - 5 June 1955
- Stages: 21
- Distance: 3,871 km (2,405 mi)
- Winning time: 108h 56' 12"

Results
Jersey awarded to the overall winner	Winner	Fiorenzo Magni (ITA)	(Nivea–Fuchs)
	Second	Fausto Coppi (ITA)	(Bianchi)
	Third	Gastone Nencini (ITA)	(Leo–Chlorodont)
	Mountains	Gastone Nencini (ITA)	(Leo–Chlorodont)
	Sprints	Nino Defilippis (ITA)	(Torpado)
	Team	Atala	

The 1955 Giro d'Italia was the 38th edition of the Giro d'Italia, one of cycling's Grand Tours. The Giro started off in Milan on 14 May with a 163 km (101.3 mi) flat stage and concluded back in Milan with a 141 km (87.6 mi) relatively flat mass-start stage on 5 June. Fourteen teams entered the race, which was won by Italian Fiorenzo Magni of the Nivea-Fuchs team. Second and third respectively were Italian riders Fausto Coppi and Gastone Nencini.

In the 20th stage, arriving in San Pellegrino Terme, Magni and Coppi attacked Gastone Nencini (who was leading the general classification) taking advantage of a puncture he suffered in an unpaved road section. Coppi won the stage (his last victory in the Giro) and Magni took the lead in the general classification.

== Teams ==
In December 1954 when the initial plans for the 1955 edition were announced, the organization announced they would invite ten Italian based teams and six foreign teams: France, Switzerland, Belgium, the Netherlands, Spain and England whom by December had confirmed participation. Belgium, Spain, Switzerland, the Netherlands, and France, after missing the previous edition, sent teams to compete in the race. Fourteen teams were invited by the race organizers to participate in the 1955 edition of the Giro d'Italia. The Spanish team missed the pre-race ceremony because they missed their flight into Milan and had to take a train into the city. Each team sent a squad of seven riders, which meant that the race started with a peloton of 98 cyclists. From the riders that began the race, 72 made it to the finish in Milan.

The 1955 Giro was run with national teams and trade teams. Most national teams were sponsored by Italian companies for the duration of the Giro.

The national teams entering the race were:

- The Netherlands (sponsored by Doniselli)
- Switzerland (sponsored by Faema)
- France
- Spain (sponsored by Ignis)
- Belgium (sponsored by Girardengo)

Italian teams entering the race were:

- Arbos
- Atala
- Bianchi
- Fréjus
- Legnano
- Leo–Chlorodont
- Nivea–Fuchs
- Torpado–Ursus
- Welter

== Pre-race favorites ==
Five-time champion Fausto Coppi (Bianchi) and Hugo Koblet (Faema) were named by most as the primary favorites to win the race overall. Coppi who was now 35 years old notably had won the Giro dell'Appennino and finished second at Paris–Roubaix. Serge Lang wrote that Coppi was the public's favorite to win, but most other riders did not him as much of an overall threat due his age. Novelliste Valaisan also named Pasquale Fornara (Leo–Chlorodont) their favorites to win the race. Fornara's best finish came in 1953 when he placed third overall, while Koblet won in 1950 and had three other top ten finishes. 1948 winner Fiorenzo Magni (Nivea–Fuchs) finished the Vuelta a España on 8 May and was viewed as contender for the general classification.

It was believed reigning champion Carlo Clerici (Faema) would be marked heavily this race after the nature of his victory the previous year when he gained significant time through a breakaway. Clerici was thought to be in good form. Faema did not include Fritz Schär who had injured his knee. Despite being a favorite to some, Koblet was not seen as a favorite by Swiss writer Serge Lang who believed he does not like climb he did when he won the race in 1950.

Young Italians including the likes of Mauro Gianneschi (Arbos), Nino Defilippis (Torpado), Giuseppe Minardi (Legnano), Agostino Coletto (Fréjus) were thought to be outside contenders for the general classification and were the team's leaders. Coletto was perceived by some to be the next great Italian general classification rider. Atala's best chances were seent with Giancarlo Astrua and Bruno Monti, the latter of which impressed at the Tour de Romandie. Astrua was perceived as a good climber and a rouleur. Gastone Nencini (Leo–Chlorodont) was a younger rider whom many felt showed a lot of promise and was known for his descending prowess.

A Nouvelliste Valaisan writer felt the Spanish team Ignis had riders that can climb very well, but lacked maturity and team comradery to obtain a high general classification ranking. The French team was believed to be very strong and in good shape prior to start. They were thought to have its best chances with Raphaël Géminiani and recent Vuelta a Espana winner Jean Dotto who both were in great form, but it was thought Géminiani could lose several minutes in the time trial stages.

Doniselli, the Dutch team, was thought to have great riders who could animate the race like Wout Wagtmans, Hein Van Breenen, and Gerrit Voorting. Notably Thijs Roks, van Breenen, and Wagtmans composed the podium for the Dutch national road race championship. Doniselli sports director Kees Pellenaars stated that Wagtmans gave the best chance for the overall victory, but instead of surrounding the whole team with him throughout the race as other Italian teams do, he would allow two to three riders to attempt attacks. Expectations of the Belgian team Girardengo by a Nouvelliste Valaisan writer were unknown as the writer cited a previous difficulty by Belgian riders in the Giro d'Italia. A notable omission from the team was Rik van Steenbergen. The teams' young riders Joseph Schils and Carl Borgmans were expected to have a good performance. In addition, the team brought a new flahute Rik Van Looy.

Other notable riders that did not participate were Frenchman Louison Bobet and Swiss rider Ferdinand Kübler. In addition, this was the first Giro d'Italia without two-time winner Gino Bartali participating. Bartali retired following the previous season, but returned to the Giro d'Italia to provide commentary for several newspapers.

== Route and stages ==
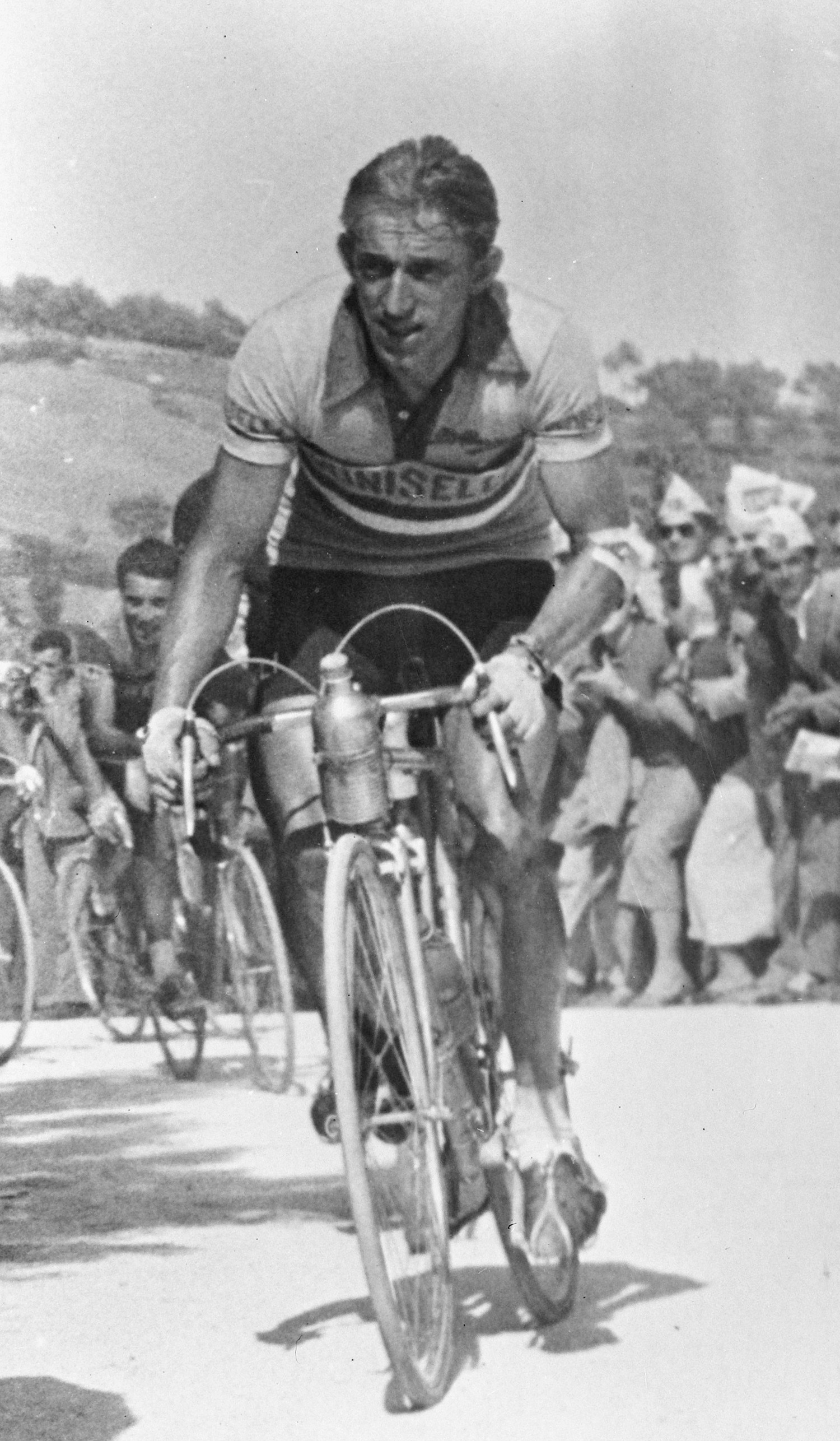
Wout Wagtmans riding during the nineteenth stage.

The route's general structure was announced on December 29, 1954 at the Palazzo Marino in Milan in front of local dignitaries. The finalized route was revealed on 9 March 1955. The route was designed in a counter-clockwise direction across twenty-one days of racing and two rest days. It contained two time trial events, one individual and one team event. The team time trial rode over the cobbled roads of Genoa. This race featured the first stage finish and start in France. The tenth stage utilized the route used in the 1955 UCI World Championships men's road race that were to be held in Frascati, Italy August that year in a 20.4 km (13 mi) loop that was traversed ten times. The highest climb was the Passo Pordoi. In total the route had roughly 25,000 m (82,021 ft) of elevation change of which five stages contained eight categorized climbs that awarded points for the mountains classification. The nineteenth stage was deemed the queen stage as it featured the climbs of the Falzarego Pass, the Col de Rolle, the Pordoi, and the Col de Brocon. Five stages ended in a velodrome.

Due to complaints from the riders about the previous year's race, the organizers reduced the amount of kilometers in the race by approximately 500 km (311 mi). Further, race organizers decided to reduce the length of the stages within the Giro d'Italia closer to 200 km (124 mi), similar to the Tour de France at the time. The stages had become known as "Italian stages" for their extreme length in hundreds of kilometers, only to have the racing start in the final 10 km. Through the reduction in stage length, the organizers hoped to have more attacking done by riders. The intermediate sprints or "flying checks" as they were known were well received and thought to have helped animate the race, with several stage winners coming from those that won the sprints of the day. The amount of intermediate sprints has been reduced by 30 this race, leaving 30 to be taken. If you win the prize you must be within the first five positions of the general classification.

A writer for Nouvelliste Valaisan felt a rouleur could win the general classification if they could take advantage of the course before the race hits the Dolomites. The Gazette de Lausanne writer Serge Lang wrote that the route was the hardest since World War II and felt the general public and most newspapers felt the route was well designed.

Stage characteristics and results
Stage	Date	Course	Distance	Type	Winner
1	14 May	Milan to Turin	163 km (101 mi)	Plain stage	Guido Messina (ITA)
2	15 May	Turin to Cannes (France)	243 km (151 mi)	Stage with mountain(s)	Fiorenzo Magni (ITA)
3	16 May	Cannes (France) to Sanremo	123 km (76 mi)	Stage with mountain(s)	Nino Defilippis (ITA)
4	17 May	Sanremo to Acqui Terme	192 km (119 mi)	Stage with mountain(s)	Alessandro Fantini (ITA)
5	18 May	Acqui Terme to Genoa	170 km (106 mi)	Stage with mountain(s)	Giancarlo Astrua (ITA)
6	19 May	Genoa to Lido d'Albaro	18 km (11 mi)	Team time trial	Torpado
7	20 May	Genoa to Viareggio	164 km (102 mi)	Stage with mountain(s)	Giovanni Corrieri (ITA)
	21 May	Rest day			
8	22 May	Viareggio to Perugia	260 km (162 mi)	Stage with mountain(s)	Rino Benedetti (ITA)
9	23 May	Perugia to Rome	174 km (108 mi)	Stage with mountain(s)	Gastone Nencini (ITA)
10	24 May	Frascati to Frascati	207 km (129 mi)	Stage with mountain(s)	Bernardo Ruiz (ESP)
11	25 May	Rome to Naples	242 km (150 mi)	Plain stage	Vincenzo Zucconelli (ITA)
12	26 May	Naples to Scanno	216 km (134 mi)	Stage with mountain(s)	Gastone Nencini (ITA)
13	27 May	Scanno to Ancona	251 km (156 mi)	Stage with mountain(s)	Giorgio Albani (ITA)
14	28 May	Ancona to Pineta di Cervia	173 km (107 mi)	Stage with mountain(s)	Giuseppe Minardi (ITA)
15	29 May	Pineta di Cervia to Ravenna	50 km (31 mi)	Individual time trial	Pasquale Fornara (ITA)
16	30 May	Ravenna to Lido di Jesolo	245 km (152 mi)	Plain stage	Rino Benedetti (ITA)
17	31 May	Lido di Jesolo to Trieste	150 km (93 mi)	Stage with mountain(s)	Alessandro Fantini (ITA)
	1 June	Rest day			
18	2 June	Trieste to Cortina d'Ampezzo	236 km (147 mi)	Stage with mountain(s)	Angelo Conterno (ITA)
19	3 June	Cortina d'Ampezzo to Trento	227 km (141 mi)	Stage with mountain(s)	Jean Dotto (FRA)
20	4 June	Trento to San Pellegrino Terme	216 km (134 mi)	Stage with mountain(s)	Fausto Coppi (ITA)
21	5 June	San Pellegrino Terme to Milan	141 km (88 mi)	Plain stage	Hugo Koblet (SUI)
	Total		3,871 km (2,405 mi)		

== Classification leadership ==
One jersey was worn during the 1955 Giro d'Italia. The leader of the general classification – calculated by adding the stage finish times of each rider – wore a pink jersey. This classification is the most important of the race, and its winner is considered as the winner of the Giro. There were no time bonuses in the 1955 Giro.

The mountains classification leader. The climbs all awarded three points to the first rider and one point to the second rider to cross the summit. There was no jersey for this classification.

The intermediate sprints classification was again based on sprints midway through a stage, and positions at the finish line, but unlike the year before, now riders only received points at the finish line if they also scored points on previous sprints in that stage. For sprints midway through a stage, the first 3 riders scored points, while at the finish line the first 5 riders could score points.

The teams classification got a new system in 1955. It was now based on stage positions: the stage positions of the three best riders per team were added, and the team with the lowest total rank was the best team. There were two separate team classifications, one for the foreign teams and one for the Italian teams (also called the G.P. dell'Industria). There were no jerseys for these classifications.

Minor classifications were the classifications for best young rider (esordienti) and best foreign rider (stranieri).

Classification leadership by stage
Stage	Winner	General classification	Mountains classification	Intermediate sprints classification	Italian Team classification	Foreign Team classification
1	Guido Messina	Guido Messina	not awarded	Henri Van Kerckhove	Legnano	Girardengo
2	Fiorenzo Magni	Fiorenzo Magni	Bruno Monti	Fiorenzo Magni	Leo-Chlorodont	Doniselli
3	Nino Defilippis	Fiorenzo Magni	Bruno Monti	Nino Defilippis	Leo-Chlorodont	Doniselli
4	Alessandro Fantini	Fiorenzo Magni	Bruno Monti	Rino Benedetti	Leo-Chlorodont	Doniselli
5	Giancarlo Astrua	Fiorenzo Magni	Bruno Monti	Nino Defilippis	Leo-Chlorodont	Doniselli
6	Torpado	Fiorenzo Magni	Bruno Monti	Nino Defilippis	Nivea-Fuchs	Faema
7	Giovanni Corrieri	Fiorenzo Magni	Bruno Monti	Nino Defilippis	Nivea-Fuchs	Faema
8	Rino Benedetti	Fiorenzo Magni	Bruno Monti	Rino Benedetti	Atala	Faema
9	Gastone Nencini	Fiorenzo Magni	Bruno Monti	Rino Benedetti	Atala	Faema
10	Bernardo Ruiz	Bruno Monti	Bruno Monti	Rino Benedetti	Atala	Faema
11	Vincenzo Zucconelli	Bruno Monti	Bruno Monti	Rino Benedetti	Atala	France
12	Gastone Nencini	Raphaël Géminiani	Bruno Monti & Gastone Nencini	Nino Defilippis	Atala	France
13	Giorgio Albani	Raphaël Géminiani	Bruno Monti & Gastone Nencini	Nino Defilippis	Atala	France
14	Giuseppe Minardi	Raphaël Géminiani	Giuseppe Minardi, Bruno Monti & Gastone Nencini	Nino Defilippis	Atala	France
15	Pasquale Fornara	Gastone Nencini	Giuseppe Minardi, Bruno Monti & Gastone Nencini	Nino Defilippis	Atala	France
16	Rino Benedetti	Gastone Nencini	Giuseppe Minardi, Bruno Monti & Gastone Nencini	Nino Defilippis	Atala	France
17	Alessandro Fantini	Gastone Nencini	Giuseppe Minardi, Bruno Monti & Gastone Nencini	Nino Defilippis	Atala	France
18	Angelo Conterno	Gastone Nencini	Bruno Monti	Nino Defilippis	Atala	France
19	Jean Dotto	Gastone Nencini	Gastone Nencini	Nino Defilippis	Atala	France
20	Fausto Coppi	Fiorenzo Magni	Gastone Nencini	Nino Defilippis	Atala	France
21	Hugo Koblet	Fiorenzo Magni	Gastone Nencini	Nino Defilippis	Atala	France
Final		Fiorenzo Magni	Gastone Nencini	Nino Defilippis	Atala	France

== Final standings ==
Legend
Pink jersey	Denotes the winner of the General classification

=== General classification ===
Final general classification (1–10)
Rank	Name	Team	Time
1	Fiorenzo Magni (ITA)	Nivea	108h 56' 12"
2	Fausto Coppi (ITA)	Bianchi	+ 13"
3	Gastone Nencini (ITA)	Chlorodont	+ 4' 08"
4	Raphaël Géminiani (FRA)	France	+ 4' 51"
5	Agostino Coletto (ITA)	Fréjus	+ 7' 19"
6	Aldo Moser (ITA)	Torpado	+ 8' 01"
7	Pasquale Fornara (ITA)	Chlorodont	+ 9' 16"
8	Salvador Botella (ESP)	Ignis	+ 14' 10"
9	Wout Wagtmans (NED)	Doniselli	+ 16' 03"
10	Hugo Koblet (SUI)	Faema	+ 20' 16"

=== Foreign rider classification ===
Final foreign rider classification (1–10)
Rank	Name	Team	Time
1	Raphaël Géminiani (FRA)	France	109h 01' 03"
2	Salvador Botella (ESP)	Ignis	+ 9' 19"
3	Wout Wagtmans (NED)	Doniselli	+ 11' 12"
4	Hugo Koblet (SUI)	Faema	+ 15' 25"
5	Hein Van Breenen (NED)	Doniselli	+ 19' 49"
6	Nello Lauredi (FRA)	Olympia	+ 32' 10"
7	Jean Dotto (FRA)	France	+ 35' 03"
8	Carlo Clerici (SUI)	Faema	+ 50' 44"
9	Bernardo Ruiz (ESP)	Ignis	+ 56' 28"
10	Gerrit Voorting (NED)	Doniselli	+ 58' 49"

=== Mountains classification ===
Final mountains classification (1–7)
Rank	Name	Team	Points
1	Gastone Nencini (ITA)	Chlorodont	7
2	José Serra (ESP)	Ignis	6
3	Bruno Monti (ITA)	Atala	4
4	Antonio Gelabert (ESP)	Ignis	4
5	Giuseppe Minardi (ITA)	Legnano	3
5	Jean Dotto (FRA)	France	3
7	Wout Wagtmans (NED)	Doniselli	1
7	Raphaël Géminiani (FRA)	France	1
7	Pierino Baffi (ITA)	Nivea-Fuchs	1
7	Giancarlo Astrua (ITA)	Atala	1
7	Salvador Botella (ESP)	Ignis	1

=== Intermediate sprints classification ===
Final intermediate sprints classification (1–9)
Rank	Name	Team	Points
1	Nino Defilippis (ITA)	Torpado	42
2	Giorgio Albani (ITA)	Legnano	39
3	Rino Benedetti (ITA)	Leo-Chlorodont	38
4	Fiorenzo Magni (ITA)	Nivea	16
5	Fausto Coppi (ITA)	Bianchi	13
6	Giuseppe Favero (ITA)	Bianchi	13
7	Louis Caput (FRA)	France	12
8	Donato Piazza (ITA)	Nivea-Fuchs	11
9	Gastone Nencini (ITA)	Chlorodont	10
9	Giovanni Corrieri (ITA)	Arbos	10
9	Angelo Conterno (ITA)	Torpado	10

=== Italian team classification ===
Final Italian team classification (1–9)
Rank	Team	Points
1	Atala	840
2	Chlorodont	918
3	Nivea	1117
4	Bianchi	1203
5	Torpado	1222
6	Legnano	1237
7	Fréjus	1437
8	Arbos	1461
9	Welter	1667

=== Foreign team classification ===
Final foreign team classification (1–5)
Rank	Team	Points
1	France	1050
2	Faema	1190
3	Doniselli	1334
4	Ignis	1347
5	Girardengo	2086
