= 1951 UCI Road World Championships – Men's road race =

Men's Individual Road Race
1951 UCI Road World Championships
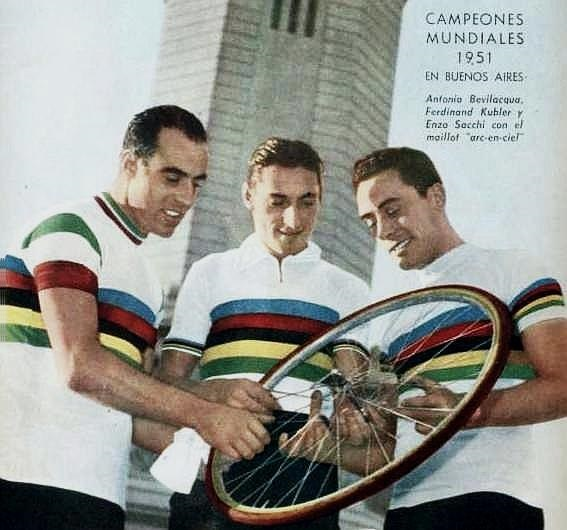
- The top-3, Antonio Bevilacqua, Ferdinand Kubler and Enzo Sacchi posing in the rainbow jersey

Race details
- Dates: 2 September 1951
- Stages: 1
- Distance: 295.2 km (183.4 mi)
- Winning time: 8h 28' 28"

Results
	Winner	Ferdinand Kübler (SUI)	(Switzerland)
	Second	Fiorenzo Magni (ITA)	(Italy)
	Third	Antonio Bevilacqua (ITA)	(Italy)

The men's road race at the 1951 UCI Road World Championships was the 18th edition of the event. The race took place on Sunday 2 September 1951 in Varese, Italy. The race was won by Ferdinand Kübler of Switzerland.

== Final classification ==
General classification (1–10)

Rank	Rider	Time
1st place, gold medalist(s)	Ferdinand Kübler (SUI)	8h 28' 28"
2nd place, silver medalist(s)	Fiorenzo Magni (ITA)	+ 0"
3rd place, bronze medalist(s)	Antonio Bevilacqua (ITA)	+ 0"
4	Jozef De Feyter (BEL)	+ 0"
5	Gerrit Voorting (NED)	+ 0"
6	Heinrich Schwarzer (FRG)	+ 0"
7	Wout Wagtmans (NED)	+ 0"
8	Giuseppe Minardi (ITA)	+ 0"
9	Gino Bartali (ITA)	+ 1' 05"
10	Hans Dekkers (NED)	+ 1' 35"
