= Fiorenzo Magni =

Italian cyclist

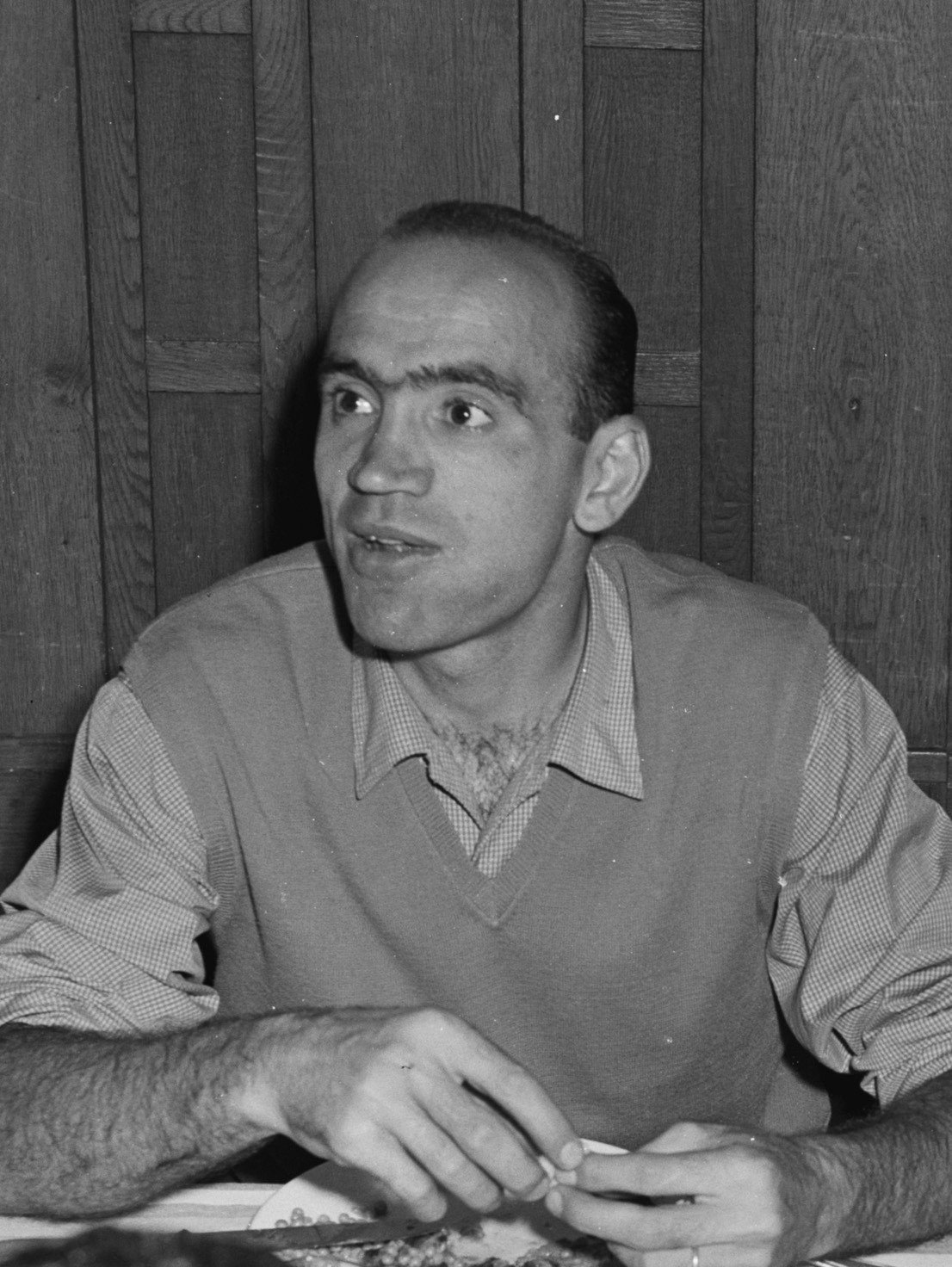
- Magni at the 1951 Tour de France

Personal information
- Full name: Fiorenzo Magni
- Nickname: Il leone delle Fiandre (The Lion of Flanders)
- Born: 7 December 1920 Vaiano, Italy
- Died: 19 October 2012 (aged 91) Monza, Italy

Cycling career
- Sport: Cycling
- Discipline: Road
- Role: Rider

Professional teams
- 1940–1943: Bianchi
- 1944: Pedale Monzese
- 1945: Ricci
- 1947–1948: Viscontea
- 1949–1950: Wilier Triestina
- 1951–1953: Ganna–Ursus
- 1954–1956: Nivea–Fuchs

Major wins
- Grand Tours Tour de France 7 individual stages (1949, 1950–1953) Giro d'Italia General classification (1948, 1951, 1955) 6 individual stages (1948, 1950, 1953, 1955) Vuelta a España Points classification (1955) 3 individual stages (1955) One-day races and Classics National Road Race Championships (1951, 1953, 1954) Tour of Flanders (1949, 1950, 1951) Milano-Torino (1951)
Medal record
Representing Italy
Men's road bicycle racing
World Championships
Silver medal – second place	1951 Varese	Elite Men's Road Race

Fiorenzo Magni (Italian pronunciation: [fjoˈrɛntso ˈmaɲɲi]; 7 December 1920 – 19 October 2012) was an Italian professional road racing cyclist.

== Biography ==
Magni was born to Giuseppe Magni and Giulia Caciolli, and had an elder sister Fiorenza. He started competing in cycling in 1936, in secret from parents. His early successes became known to locals, including his parents, they allowed him to continue.

After the death of his father in December 1937, Magni left school to take over his father's business and provide incomes for the family, yet he continued his cycling workouts.

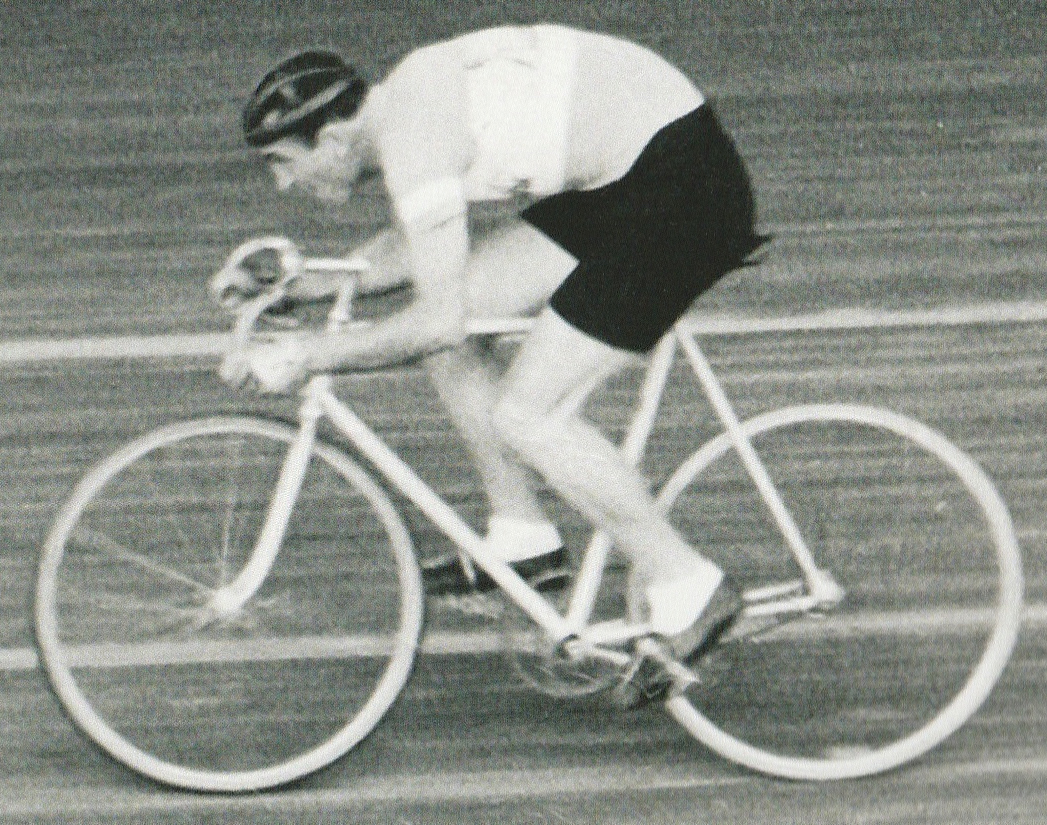
Magni breaking the world record over 100 km at Velodromo Vigorelli on 7 November 1942.

Shortly before the war in Italy on 10 June 1940, Magni was recruited to serve as a gunner at the 19th Regiment of Florence, although he had requested to become a bersagliere, while being licensed to dispute a race, its battalion was embarked for Albania, but the ship, where he should have been on board, also sank without leaving survivors.

He moved to the Olympic Battalion of Rome where he remained until 1943 when he returned to Florence at the 41st Artillery Regiment. After the armistice of 8 September 1943 he was recalled to serve the newborn Italian Social Republic and, in the Voluntary Military Forces of National Security, he was in charge of the railway control at the side of the carabinieri in Vaiano, his country of birth.

In January 1944 Magni's battalion, together with carabinieri, men of the Muti Legion and the Carita' Band, was involved in a violent confrontation with the local partisans, giving rise to the Battle of Valibona, with deaths on both sides. When Magni arrived the fights were already over, but later on he would be charged with numerous accusations, including the killing of Lanciotto Ballerini, the band leader.

On 5 November 1947 Magni married Liliana Calò; they had two daughters, Tiziana and Beatrice. In 1951, at the peak of his cycling career, Magni started working for Moto Guzzi, and two years later began selling cars with Lancia. Later in 1980 he became an official dealer for Opel and some Asian companies. In the 1980s he was also involved in trading petroleum products with Giorgio Albani.

Magni terminated his business activities in 2009. He died on 19 October 2012 in Monza, near Monticello Brianza, where he had lived since 1975.

== Professional cycling career ==
During the war Magni combined track and road events, but later focused on road racing. He was the "third man" of the golden age of Italian cycling, at the time of the rivalry between Fausto Coppi and Gino Bartali. The highlights of his career were his three overall wins in the 1948, 1951 and 1955 Giro d'Italia, and the three consecutive wins (record) at the Tour of Flanders (1949, 1950 and 1951).

Magni excelled at racing in extreme weather conditions, especially in cold, windy, rainy or snowy days. All three of his victories at the Tour of Flanders were in harsh, cold conditions. He rode Tour de France in 1949–53 and wore the yellow jersey at least once.

During the 12th stage of the 1950 Tour de France, while he was wearing the yellow jersey, he was forced to retire from the race (together with all the other Italian riders) by Bartali, captain of the Italian team, who had been threatened and assaulted by some French supporters accusing him of causing Jean Robic's fall.

Years later, when asked about how he felt abandoning in the yellow jersey he replied: "Of course I felt bad about that but I believe that there are bigger things than a technical result, even one as important as winning the Tour de France."

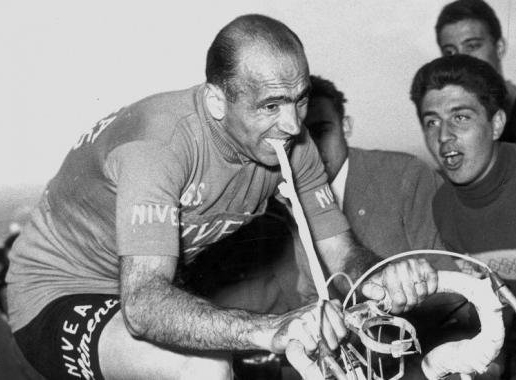
Magni at the 1956 Giro d'Italia

In the 1956 Giro d’Italia, stage 12, Fiorenzo Magni famously broke his left clavicle and still managed to finish second overall. At the hospital he refused a plaster cast and refused to abandon the Giro in the year of his announced retirement.

Magni continued the race with his shoulder wrapped in an elastic bandage. To compensate for his inability to apply force with his left arm, he raced while holding a piece of rubber inner tube attached to his handlebar between his teeth for extra leverage. Since his injury prevented him from effectively braking and steering with his left hand, the next day (Modena-Rapallo), Magni crashed again after hitting a ditch by the road during a descent on stage 16. He fell on his already broken clavicle, breaking his humerus, after which he passed out from the pain. They put him in an ambulance, but when Magni regained his senses and realized that he was being taken to the hospital he screamed and told the driver to stop. He chase the group, caught it and arrived on Bondone under a blizzard. For this gesture Italian actors Ugo Tognazzi and Raimondo Vianello nicknamed him Fiorenzo il Magnifico. Of the evening that followed Magni said "I had no idea of how serious my condition was, I just knew that I was in a lot of pain but I didn't want to have X-rays that evening".

Just four stages later, the infamous 20th stage of Giro '56 dawned where Luxembourg's Charly Gaul would execute his legendary mountain stage victory in Trento, haunted by snow and ice over the Costalunga, Rolle, Brocon and Bondone climbs. That day 60 people abandoned the race, and Gaul went from 16 minutes behind to winning the 1956 Giro; Magni, despite his injuries, placed second, 3 minutes and 27 seconds behind Gaul.

Magni has been mentor to at least two famous frame builders. Ernesto Colnago worked on his first Giro d'Italia in 1954 as second mechanic. First mechanic at that time was Faliero Masi, who Magni described in an interview as “The best mechanic of all time.”

It was Masi’s idea to use the piece of inner tube attached to his handlebar when he broke his clavicle the 1956 Giro d’Italia.

When asked what it was like to ride against Coppi and Bartali, Magni replied: "In life, defeats are more likely to happen than wins. Losing to Coppi and Bartali, and therefore congratulating them, is an experience that I am happy to have had and an experience that taught me a lot. I have always admired them for what they could do and esteemed them for who they were. Not only were they champions, they were also great men. Why do you think we are still speaking about them? Because they made history. I consider myself lucky because racing with them I could be part of this history. I would have won more without them but it wouldn't have been during a legendary cycling era."

== Career achievements ==
=== Major results ===
1942
1st Giro del Piemonte
1947
1st Tre Valli Varesine
9th Overall Giro d'Italia
1948
1st Overall Giro d'Italia

1st Stage 19

1949
1st Tour of Flanders
1st Giro della Toscana
1st Trofeo Baracchi
6th Overall Tour de France

1st Stage 10

1950
1st Tour of Flanders
1st Trofeo Baracchi
1st Stage 8 Tour de France
6th Overall Giro d'Italia

1st Stage 16

1951
1st Overall Giro d'Italia
1st Road race, National Road Championships
1st Tour of Flanders
1st Giro del Lazio
1st Giro di Romagna
1st Milano–Torino
1st Trofeo Baracchi
2nd Road race, UCI Road World Championships
7th Overall Tour de France

1st Stage 18

1952
2nd Overall Giro d'Italia
6th Overall Tour de France

1st Stages 6 & 22

1st Rome–Naples–Rome
1953
1st Road race, National Road Championships
1st Giro del Piemonte
1st Giro del Veneto
Tour de France

1st Stages 9 & 22

1st Sassari–Cagliari
1st Rome–Naples–Rome
9th Overall Giro d'Italia

1st Stage 10, 16 & 21

1954
1st Road race, National Road Championships
1st Giro della Toscana
1st Milan–Modena
6th Overall Giro d'Italia
1955
1st Overall Giro d'Italia

1st Stage 2

Vuelta a España

1st Points classification
1st Stages 7, 13 & 15

1st Giro di Romagna
1st Milan–Modena
1956
1st Giro del Piemonte
1st Giro del Lazio
2nd Overall Giro d'Italia

=== Grand Tour general classification results timeline ===
Grand Tour	1947	1948	1949	1950	1951	1952	1953	1954	1955	1956
Vuelta a España	—	—	—	—	—	—	—	—	13	—
Giro d'Italia	9	1	DNF	6	1	2	9	6	1	2
Tour de France	—	—	6	DNF	7	6	15	—	—	—

Legend
—	Did not compete
DNF	Did not finish
DSQ	Disqualified

== See also ==
- Legends of Italian sport - Walk of Fame

== Bibliography ==
- Bulbarelli, Auro (2012). Magni. Il terzo uomo. Roma: Rai Eri. ISBN 978-88-397-1579-1.
