= Rino Benedetti =

Italian cyclist

Personal information
- Full name: Rino Benedetti
- Born: 18 November 1928 Ponte Buggianese, Italy
- Died: 14 June 2002 (aged 73) Lucca, Italy

Cycling career
- Sport: Cycling
- Discipline: Road
- Role: Rider

Professional teams
- 1951–1954: Legnano (cycling team)
- 1955–1956: Leo-Chlorodont
- 1957: Bottecchia- Gripo
- 1958: Cali Broni-Girardengo-Liberta / Tigra
- 1959–1960: Ghigi (cycling team)
- 1961–1962: Ignis (cycling team)
- 1963: Cynar (cycling team)

Major wins
- 4 stages Giro d'Italia; 1 stage Tour de France; 1 stage Vuelta a España
Medal record
Representing Italy
Men's road bicycle racing
World Championships
Silver medal – second place	1951 Varese	Amateur's Road Race

Rino Benedetti (18 November 1928 in Ponte Buggianese – 14 June 2002) was an Italian professional road bicycle racer, who won stages in all the three Grand Tours.

== Major results ==
1950
Gran Premio Montanino
1951
Giro del Mendrisiotto
1952
Giro d'Italia:

Winner stage 8

1953
Gran Premio Industria e Commercio di Prato
1954
Coppa Sabatini
1955
Trofeo Fenaroli
Giro della Provincia di Reggio Calabria
Giro d'Italia:

Winner stages 8 and 16

1956
Giro d'Italia

stage 2b (team time trial)

1957
Vuelta a España:

Winner stage 9

1958
Tour de Suisse

Winner stage 2 and 4

Giro di Sicilia

Winner stage 2 and 4

Coppa Città di Busto Arsizio
1959
Coppa Sabatini
Giro del Veneto
Giro di Campania
Giro d'Italia:

Winner stage 10

1961
GP Industria/Quarrata
Trofeo Fenaroli
Four Days of Dunkirk

Winner stage 1a

1962
Tour de France:

Winner stage 22

Volta a Catalunya

Winner stage 2
