= Colnago =

Italian bicycle maker

Coordinates: 45.5729°N 9.4180°E

- Industry: Bicycle industry
- Founded: 1954; 72 years ago in Cambiago
- Founder: Ernesto Colnago
- Headquarters: Cambiago, Italy
- Area served: Worldwide
- Products: Bicycles, E-bike and related components
- Owner: Chimera Investments LLC (majority since 2020)
- Website: colnago.com

Colnago Ernesto & C. S.r.l. or Colnago is a manufacturer of road-racing bicycles founded by Ernesto Colnago near Milan in Cambiago, Italy. It remained a family-controlled firm until May 4, 2020, when it was announced that the UAE-based investment company, Chimera Investments LLC, had acquired a majority of the Colnago shares from Ernesto Colnago, although the headquarters will remain located in Italy after the acquisition. Instead of following his family's farming business, Ernesto Colnago chose to work in the cycle trade, and was apprenticed first to Gloria Bicycles at the age of 13, and subsequently taking up road racing. After a bad crash ended his racing career, he began subcontracting for Gloria, and opened his own shop in 1954, building his first frames the same year. While building frames, he remained much in demand as a racing mechanic. He was second mechanic on the Nivea–Fuchs team in the Giro d'Italia race under Faliero Masi in 1955, eventually being employed as head mechanic for the Molteni team of Belgian cycling legend Eddy Merckx in 1963.

The company first became known for high quality steel framed bicycles suitable for the demanding environment of professional racing, and later as one of the more creative cycling manufacturers responsible for innovations in design and experimentation with new and diverse materials including carbon fiber, now a mainstay of modern bicycle construction. In 2020, having lost his wife and brother, Ernesto Colnago sold his majority interest in the company to a United Arab Emirates investment firm.

== History ==
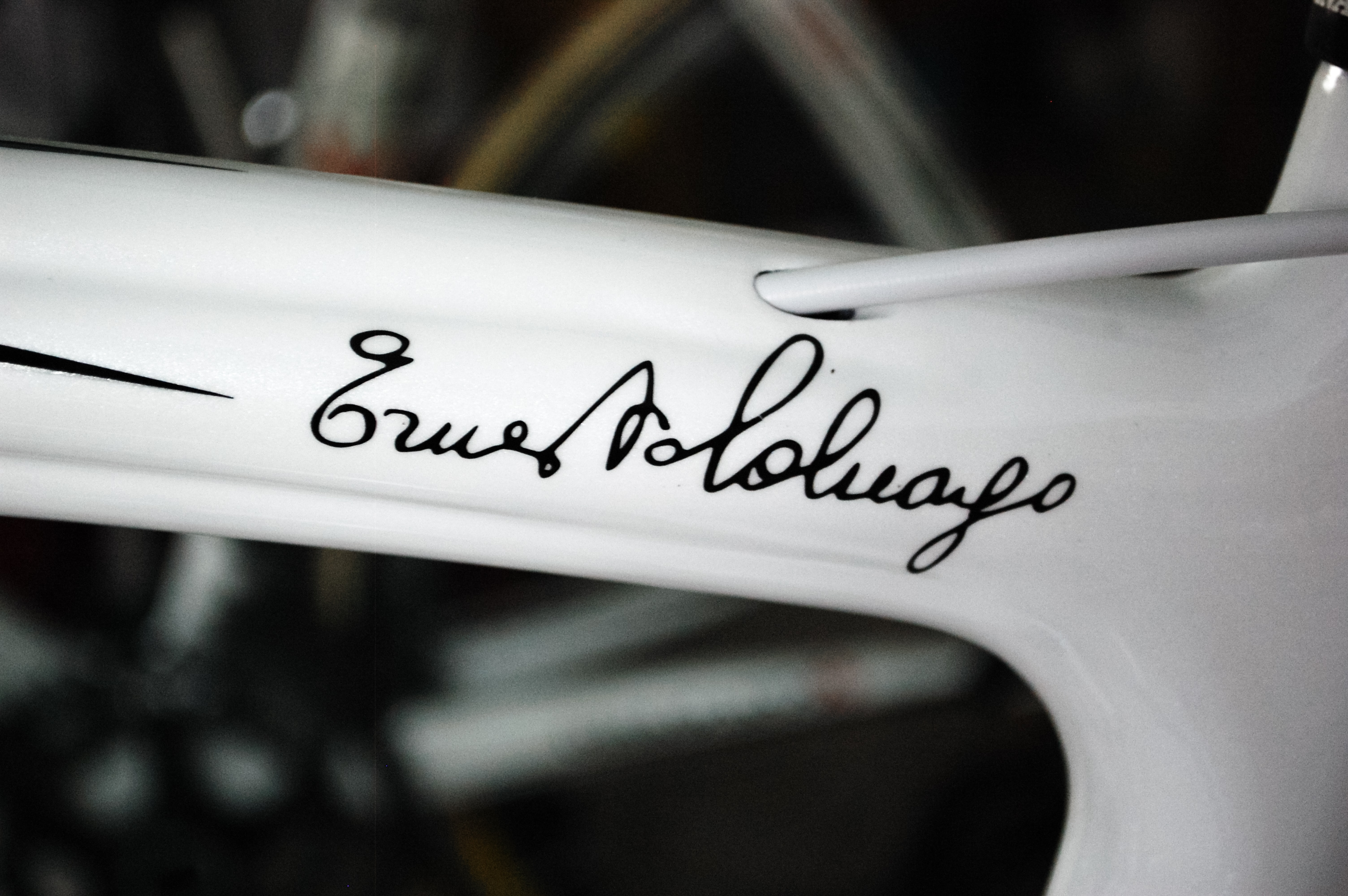
The signature of Ernesto Colnago, no longer seen on new Colnago bicycles since Chimera/UAE 51% share stake in brand.

One of the first big victories on a Colnago frame was in 1957, when Gastone Nencini won the 1957 edition of the Giro d’Italia bicycle race on a Colnago bicycle. In 1960, Colnago achieved more recognition as Luigi Arienti rode to a gold medal at the Rome Olympics on a Colnago bicycle. By the late 1960s, Colnago was generally regarded as one of the builders of the world's best steel road race frames.

While Ernesto was the head mechanic of the Molteni team riders such as Gianni Motta raced on Colnago cycles. A win on a Colnago in the 1970 Milan-San Remo race by Michele Dancelli for the Molteni team inspired Colnago to change his logo to the now-famous 'Asso di Fiori' or Ace of Clubs. After the demise of the Faema team, Eddy Merckx joined the Molteni team, and what ensued was mutual innovation—as Colnago describes it: "Merckx was an up and coming champion, and I was an up and coming bike builder. So it was a real honour to work for a great champion like Merckx. It helped us to grow... when we made special forks, and special bikes." This included the super-light steel frame used by Merckx in 1972 to break the world one-hour record.

With a growing reputation from their racing wins, Colnago entered the market for production bikes. In the U.S., the early seventies saw another bike boom, and Colnago "pumped out bikes as though the future of humankind was at stake." The mainstay of the Colnago line in the 1970s was the Super, followed by the Mexico, named in honor of the successful hour attempt. Other models were added including the Superissimo and Esa Mexico. While the finish on these early Colnagos could be variable, they were great riding bikes and developed a cult-like following.

In 1979, Ernesto Colnago presented Pope John Paul II with a custom gold-plated steel bicycle.

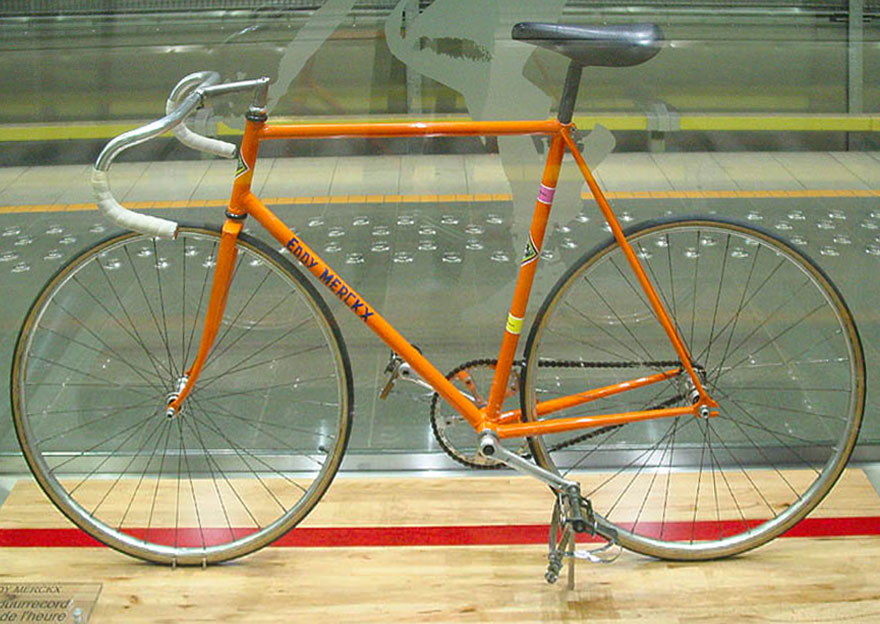
The bicycle used by Eddy Merckx to break the Hour record in 1972 used a Colnago frame.

In response to criticism that his frames were not stiff enough, next Colnago experimented with ways to change the behavior of frame components. In 1983, he introduced the Oval CX with an oval section top tube to add stiffness. He then experimented with various crimped-tube frames which became production models as their top of the range frames, beginning with the "Super Profil" and "Master." Later "Master-Light", Master Olympic and Master Più extended the range. Colnago built a frame from Columbus tubing used by Giuseppe Saronni to win the world professional road race championship in 1982, and afterwards a short-lived collection of bikes were badged with the Saronni name. In 1983, Giuseppe Saronni would go on to win the Giro d'Italia stage race on a Colnago bicycle. Steel frames winning races made Colnago's reputation: "Between them, Eddy Merckx and Giuseppe Saronni won 719 races from 1965 to 1988, and the bulk of those victories were aboard a steel Colnago. Ernesto Colnago first designed the Master frame in 1982 as a replacement for the Mexico, which was named after Eddy Merckx’s successful Hour record in Mexico city. Over the course of 17 years in the pro peloton, the Master was ridden to hundreds of wins, and there are few bikes that have such a palmarès.":

Since the 1980s, while Colnago continued to produce high-end steel bikes, they began to produce cycle frames using material other than steel, including titanium, aluminum, carbon fiber and mixed materials. One unique frame from this period, the Bititan, has a dual titanium down tube. Crimped and oversize tubes were used on the Tecnos–one of the lightest production steel bikes produced. Similarly crimped oversized aluminum tubes were used on the Dream frame. In 1981 Colnago prototyped the CX Pista–a full monocoque carbon fiber cycle with disc wheels, which was shown at the Milan bike show. Subsequently, Colnago worked with Ferrari to develop new carbon fiber technology, and Ernesto also credits their engineers for challenging him regarding fork design, which led to Colnago's innovative Precisa straight-bladed steel fork (1987). Colnago also experimented with multi-material frames, including the CT-1 and CT-2 constructed with titanium main tubes, carbon fiber forks and rear stays, and a similarly constructed (although short-lived) Master frame constructed with steel main tubes, carbon forks and stays.

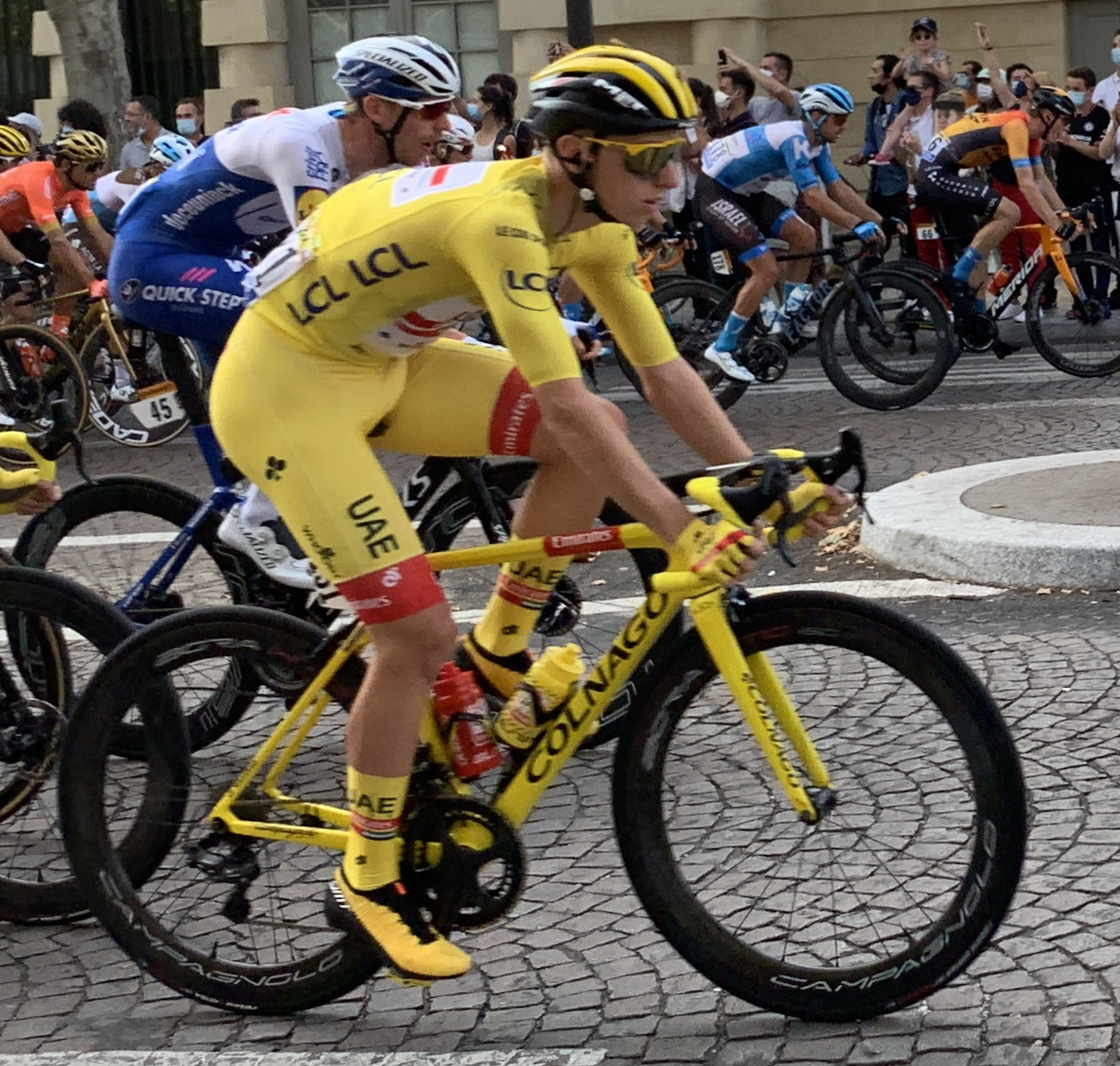
Tadej Pogačar riding a yellow Colnago on the final stage of the 2020 Tour de France.

Colnago's early attempts at carbon fiber frames were not commercially successful, but the lessons learned were embodied in their flagship frames, such as the C-40, the most sought after bicycle (1994), and its successor, the C-50 (2004)–respectively named for Colnago's 40th and 50th years in bike building. These carbon fiber frames set new standards of excellence. They were built using a modified form of traditional cycle frame construction, substituting carbon fiber lugs for microinfusion cast steel, and carbon fiber "tubes" for the complex steel tubes used for steel frame construction. Similar building techniques are used in the latest design, the C59, named (as before) for its year of production. While we take for granted the spread of carbon frames, their success was not a foregone conclusion:

When we built the C40 we were the only ones to build carbon frames and all the mechanics and competitor technicians were saying that they would be too dangerous to use on cobbled roads, especially with the straight carbon forks. There was a company that wanted to fit suspension forks on the bicycle, but I wasn't going to have suspension forks on the C40. The night before Paris- Roubaix I had Mr. Squinzi, the Mapei boss, on the phone to me raising his concerns about using such a delicate-looking thing. I told him that we'd done all of the tests that we could on the frame and the fork and we were certain there would be no problem. I had to take personal responsibility for what was going to happen and I spent all night worrying about it, barely able to sleep. But when I heard that there were 4 Mapei riders in the break, I knew I could relax.

The C40 went on to win 5 editions of Paris-Roubaix in 6 years. Surprisingly, the victory of Tadej Pogačar in the 2020 edition of the Tour de France marked the first time a Colnago-branded bicycle was ridden by the overall classification winner, since Merckx's victories were aboard re-branded bikes.

== Trademark ==
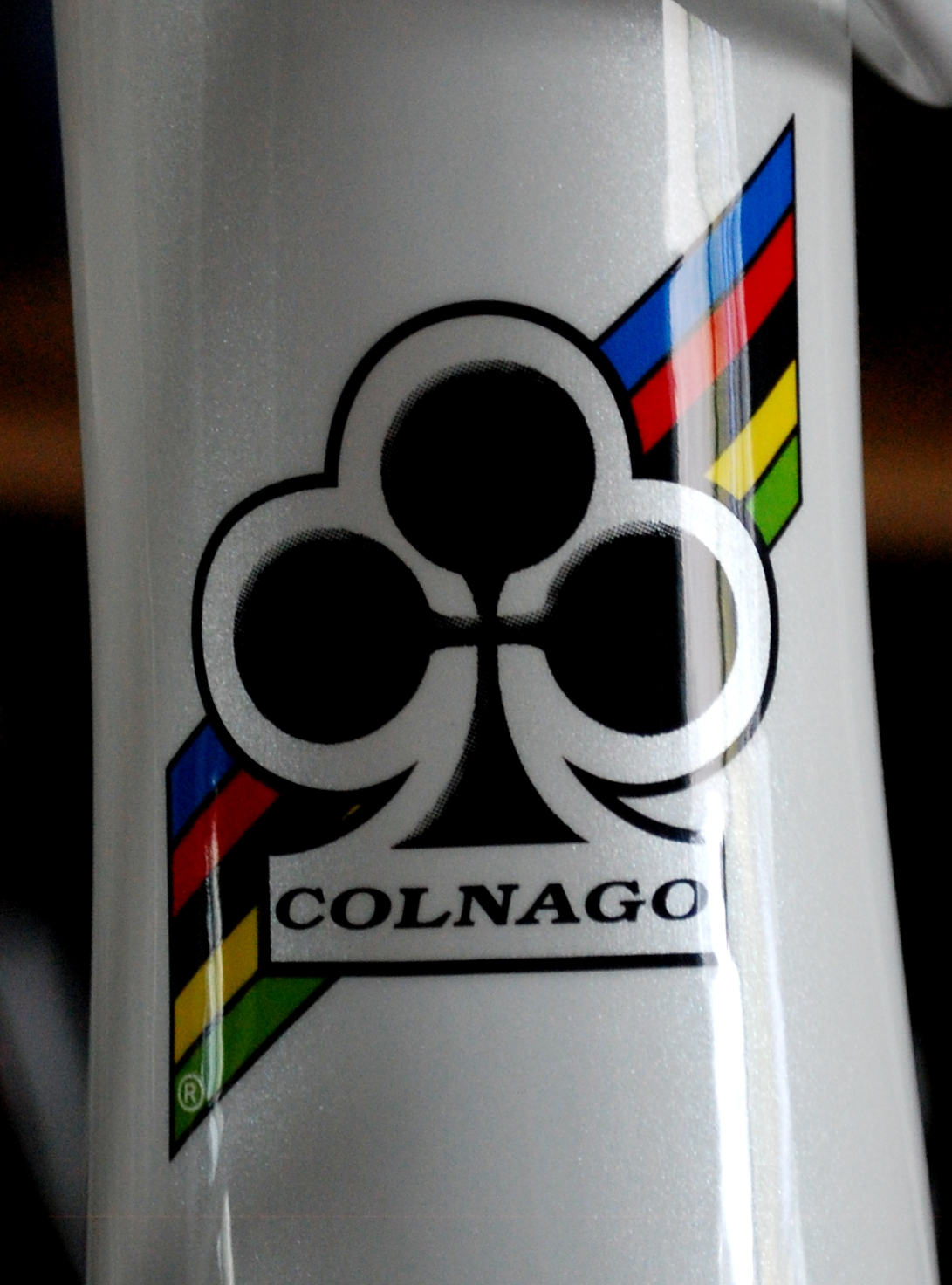
Colnago logo on a frame

Colnago uses a black symbol similar to the ♣ ("Clubs") symbol used on playing cards. Colnago frames' graphics evolved from a font with gravitas to elaborate and/or creative paint.

== Colnago sponsored bicycle racing teams since 1968 ==
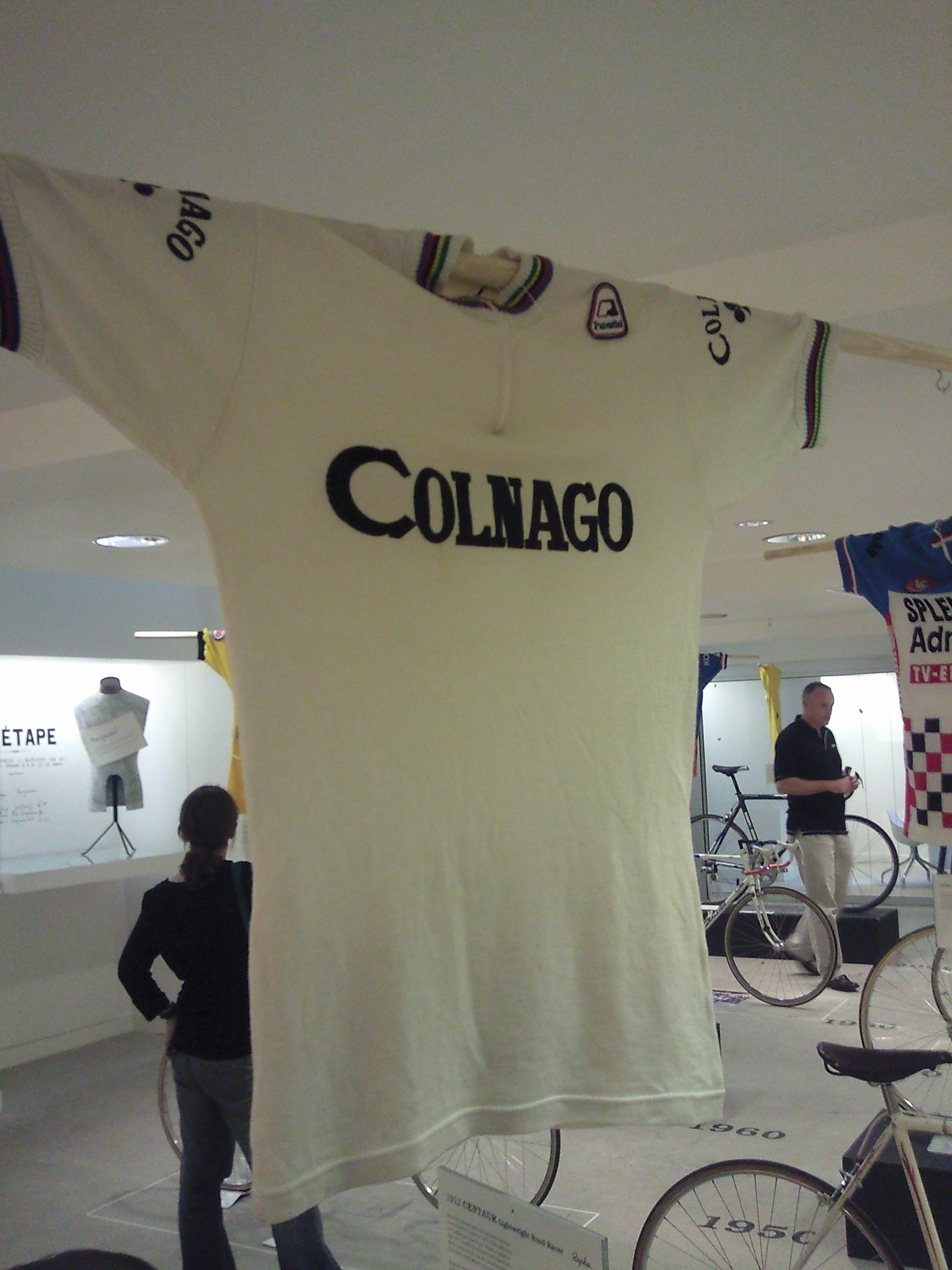
Colnago jersey

Colnago has sponsored at least one professional team every year since 1974, often sponsoring more than one. In addition, other teams in the peloton have competed on Colnago bikes. Probably the most famous was the Molteni team which included Eddy Merckx, but the world champion, Giuseppe Saronni also rode Colnago bikes throughout his career, from 1977 with Scic, later with Gis Gelati and with Colnago-Del Tongo. In 2021 Colnago confirmed that Saronni used Super at Goodwood 1982 and 1983 Giro D’ Italia. Colnago was well known as a sponsor of the legendary Mapei cycling team throughout the 1990s. For 2005, Colnago sponsored the professional cycling team Rabobank. Colnago has also been the bike sponsor for the American domestic team, Navigators for whom the Australian sprinter Hilton Clarke was a member 2005–2008.

For 2006, Team Milram joined their list of professionally sponsored teams featuring well-known Alessandro Petacchi and Erik Zabel. In addition, Colnago serves as a co-title sponsor of the Landbouwkrediet-Colnago professional cycling team that competes on the UCI Europe Tour and was the official frame supplier to Team Tinkoff in 2007. Starting in the 2011 Tour de France, Team Europcar has ridden Colnago frames. For 2012, Colnago is sponsoring Colnago-CSF Bardiani.

A full list of teams is provided below. All years are inclusive.

- 1968 - 1973: Molteni
- 1969 - 1978: SCIC
- 1975 - 1976: Zonca-Santini
- 1975 - 1979: Kas Campagnolo
- 1977: Ijsboerke-Colnago
- 1977: Kanel-Colnago
- 1978: Mecap-Selle Italia
- 1978 - 1979: Miniflat-ys-vdb-Colnago
- 1978: Intercontinentale
- 1979: Sapa
- 1979: Inoxpran
- 1979 - 1983: Lano-Boul d'Or
- 1980 - 1981: Gis Gelati
- 1980 - 1981: Sunair Sport 80 Colnago
- 1980: Splendor
- 1982 - 1988: Del Tongo-Colnago
- 1984 - 2008: Kwantum–Decosol–Yoko
- 1984: Safir Colnago
- 1985: Safir van den Ven Colnago
- 1985: Tonissteiner Saxon
- 1986: Miko Tonissteiner Fevrier
- 1986 - 1988: Roland Colnago
- 1988 - 1989: Panasonic-Isostar
- 1989: Malvor-Sidi
- 1989 - 1990: Alfalum
- 1989 - 1993: CLAS–Cajastur
- 1990: La William
- 1990 - 1996: Diana-Colnago
- 1991 - 1993: Ariostea
- 1993 - 1999: Tonissteiner Colnago Saxon
- 1994 - 2002: Mapei
- 1996 - 1997: Casino
- 1999: Lampre Daikin
- 2001: Coast
- 2001 - 2006: Landbouwkrediet Colnago
- 2001 - 2007: Navigators
- 2005: Domina Vacanze
- 2005: Action
- 2005: Skil Shimano
- 2005 - 2012: Ceramica Panaria-Navigare
- 2006 - 2008: Team Milram
- 2007 - 2008: Tinkoff Credit Systems
- 2007 - 2010: Landbouwkrediet-Tonissteiner
- 2010 - 2015: BBox-Bouyges Telecom
- 2010: Pendragon-Colnago
- 2010 - 2013: Team Type 1
- 2013 - 2021: Gazprom–RusVelo
- 2014: Dubai Classic Bike
- 2016 - 2021: Team Novo Nordisk
- 2017: Colnago Owners Group - UAE
- 2017 - onwards: UAE Team Emirates
- 2018: FFR Dubai
- 2022 - onwards: UAE Team ADQ

== Current production overview ==
Until early 2006, Colnago produced virtually all of their entire frameset range at their Cambiago factory, although persistent rumors of subcontracting out the more basic frames go all the way back to the 1970s. Alan produced some aluminum frames for Colnago in the 1980s, including single and dual downtube road and cyclocross models. In March, 2005, Colnago announced that they were joining the Taiwanese-based A-Team, whose members include Giant, Merida and SRAM—the first Italian manufacturer to do so, to produce mid-ranged bicycle models for the Japanese and European markets.

Beginning in 2006, Colnago sourced the Primavera and the Arte from Giant Bicycles of Taiwan. Both received favorable reviews, although some thought the shift of manufacturing out of Italy was a matter of some regret.

There was some controversy in 2006 over whether Giant would be producing additional models, including carbon frame models, for Colnago. According to statements by Ernesto Colnago this was not the case:

For the 2006 model year, Colnago will be sourcing two entry-level aluminum road bike models from Giant, made to Colnago's spec and frame geometry and for sales in Europe and Asia only. All other Colnago bicycles are assembled in Italy. No Colnago carbon fiber frames are made at Giant and none will be, as Mr. Colnago has a long-term sourcing agreement in place with ATR for carbon fiber bicycle frames."

Despite this denial, since 2007 Colnago's carbon monocoque CLX frame has been manufactured in Taiwan. In 2008, a second Colnago carbon fiber model, the CX-1 was also sourced in Taiwan.

The top-of-the-line Colnago frame, the C64, as well as the Master, and the now discontinued C60, C59, C50, Extreme Power, Extreme C are (or were) manufactured and painted in Italy. In a series of public statements, Colnago has insisted that all designs originate with the Italian design team, claiming that the essence of what makes a Colnago is design. The mid-range carbon offerings are currently being sourced from Taiwan, (as are many bicycle manufacturers' offerings), and as of 2011, the M10 (which stands second in the model lineup) is made in Taiwan and assembled and painted in Italy, while the CX-1 is completely made in Taiwan.

The current top-of-the-line frame, the C68, is still made fully in Italy.

== Frames ==
=== Steel ===
1975 Colnago Super. Restored and repainted professionally. Driveside Chainstay and dropouts chromed, 3 top tube brazed cable guides added. Size 52cm width wheel rims.

- Super Version 1 (1968–1978)--Columbus SL tubing, circular tubing (top tube, downtube, seat tube) crimped chainstays, cable routing above bottom bracket.
- Mexico (1975–1977)--Columbus Record tubing, no crimping on chainstays and variant Esa Mexico
- Super Profil (1982-83/84) two versions—with fluted stamp stay cap, 1984 with flat stamp stay cap.
- Super Version 2 (1978-late 1980's)--Columbus SL tubing, circular tubing (top tube, downtube, seat tube) Colnago lettering embossed on the seat stay caps, machined chainstay bridge.
- Nuevo Mexico, two models, (1983 version and 1985), Columbus Record tubing, crimped top tube and downtube.
- Tecnos (1995–2000)--Colnago's lightest production steel racing frame made with custom Tecnos tubeset (proprietary Columbus Nivachrom steel), oversize top and down tubes with five-rib-clover shaping. Chromed three point crown-tip lugs on head tube and Precisa steel fork (when not shipped with a carbon fork). Last iteration was labeled 'Tecnos 2000' including the tubing label.
- Master (1983–Present)--Top of the line steel frame with Precisa steel fork. Columbus Gilco fluted tubes on main triangle. There are a number of known variations. Master Olympic, Master Light, Master Più.
- Other steel models include the Superissimo, the Super Più, the Export (1982–3), the C-94 (1994), the C-97 (Thron tubing Decor era), the Elegant (Tange in 1994, later EL-OS tubing) and the Classic (~2000); a descendant of the Super/Superissimo made with Zona tubing.

=== Aluminum ===
- Duall—(1988) Double downtube aluminum tubes bonded to aluminum lugs manufactured by Alan for Colnago, lug design from the single downtube version.
- MegaMaster—welded Columbus Altec aluminium alloy profiled tubes with mega downtube and a "master" profile top tube.
- Asso—(2000s) Altec Zonal triple butted tubing; master profile top tube.
- VIP 2000—Altec Zonal Columbus 7005
- Dream—(2000s) Welded Columbus Airplane aluminum tubing; shaped Tecnos-style top and down tube. Later incarnation added the HP carbon rear stays.
- Active—(2004–2005) Columbus Altec2 aluminum teardrop shape tubing with carbon B-stay and carbon fork, Italian threaded bottom bracket
- Active Plus—(2006-)
- Colnago Mix—(2004-2006?) Aluminum with oversize aluminum chain stays and carbon fiber seat stays; Master shaped top tube and a Dream shaped down tube.
- Rapid—Tig welded oversize proprietary Columbus "Custom" 7003 aluminum alloy tubing

=== Titanium ===
- Master Titan—Welded 6AL/4V titanium alloy tubing with profiled top tube and down tubes
- Oval Titan—oversized ovalized top and down tube welded titanium
- Bi-Titan—Welded dual titanium down tube
- Titanio—(mid-1990s) Single downtube standard profile (1"), all titanium welded frame, steel fork
- CT-1--Welded titanium main tubes, monostay rear with bonded carbon fiber stays, 1" carbon fork
- CT-2--Like CT-1, but with HP stays and 1.125" carbon fork

=== Carbon ===
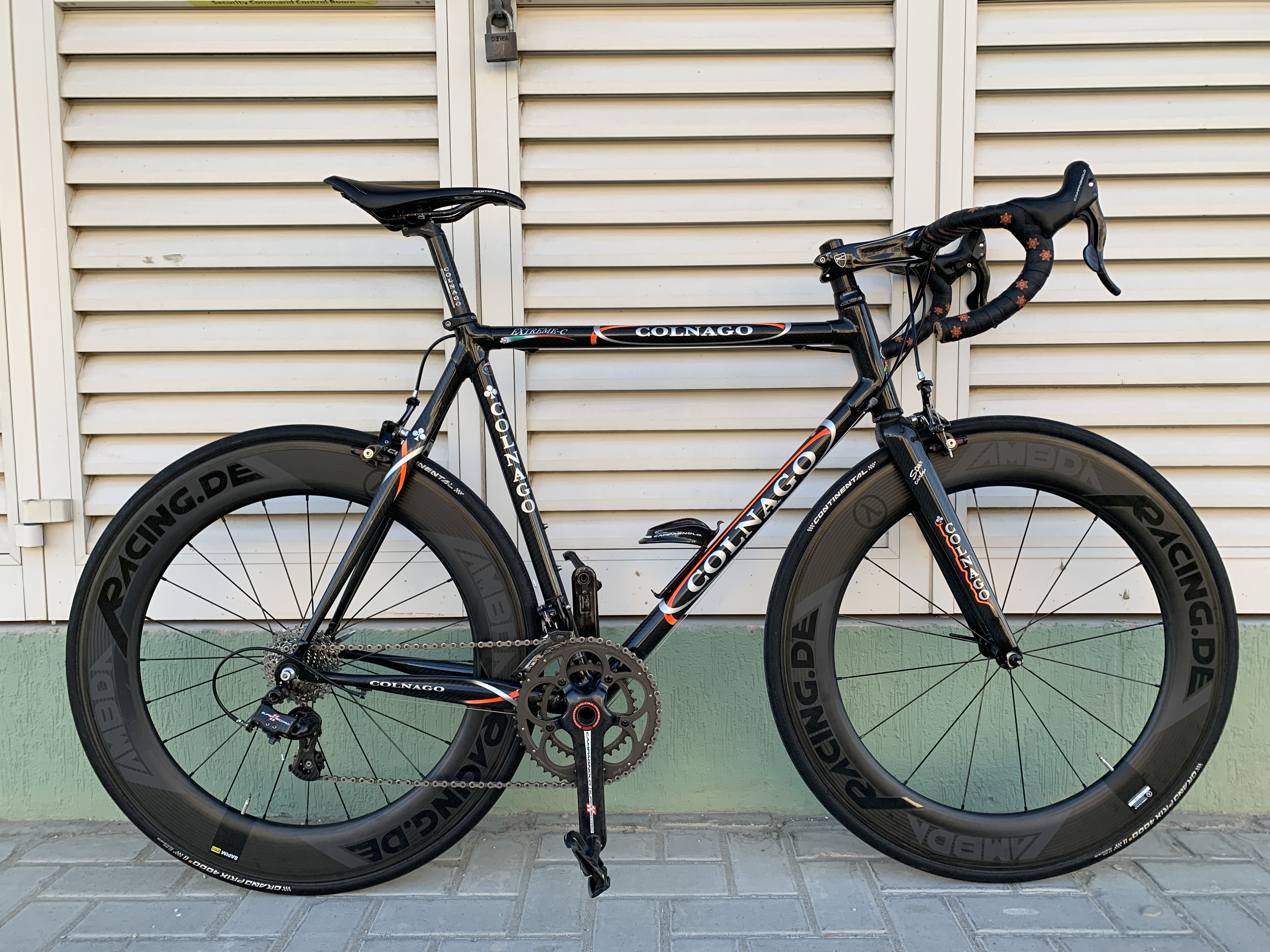
A Colnago 2006 Extreme C Model

- Volo—(1988) Carbon fiber reinforced with Kevlar monocoque frame
- C35—(1989) Full carbon monocoque frame.
- Carbitubo—(1988–1991) Shipped as a single ‘mono’ carbon downtube tubes bonded with aluminum lugs, later a double downtube was tried. Produced in conjunction with Alan. See pictures here.
- C40—(1993/4-) Full carbon first shipped with Precisa steel fork, later with carbon fork. First generation shipped with round tubes; later with Master profile carbon tubes bonded to carbon lugs.
- CF1—(2000) Colnago-Ferrari collaboration, Carbon monocoque. Several iterations of the Ferrari CF frames followed.
- Cristallo (2004). An all-carbon monocoque frame weighing 1,100g which is rare in production and information.
- C50—(2004) Similar construction to C40 with 1.125 fork.
- C50 CX Limited edition, special version built for cyclocross, with cantilever brake bosses front/rear.
- C50 Krono (2005), special version built for time trial. Similar construction of the well known C50, but with aero tubes and special tearshape seatpost. Used by pro teams like Rabobank from 2005 till 2007.
- Prestige CX Monocoque (lugless) carbon frame for cyclocross, first version had canti bosses, second version has disc brake fittings.
- Extreme C—(2006) Lightweight full carbon climbing bike, carbon lug and round carbon tube construction with shorter lugs.
- Extreme Power—(2007) Similar construction to C40/C50 but stiffer construction also using round carbon tubes.
- CX1—(2007) Carbon monocoque front end bonded to carbon stays. It is also the first Colnago to feature an integrated headset
- CLX—(2008) Carbon monocoque; rear triangle is molded separately from the front, and attached via bonded lugs
- EPS—(2009) Lug and tube construction with integrated headset and new fork design
- EPQ— (2011) Redone Extreme Power (EP) tube and lug construction with more square profile rear stays ('Q-Stay') that adds stiffness, shared with the M10 and C59. Semi-integrated headset.
- C59—(2011) Carbon tube and lug bonded frame like C40/C50 (2011) with profiled tubes similar to the Master.
- M10—(2011) Monocoque construction with similar geometry to the C59 but with a slightly shorter top tube and longer head tube.
- CX-Zero—(2013) Full monocoque frameset, integrated headset, first Colnago to feature press fit 86.5 bottom bracket, designed for cobbled classics races.
- V1-r—(2014) Replaces the M10 as the top Taiwan-made monocoque carbon frame. Developed in collaboration with Ferrari Engineering.
- AC-R—(2014-) Entry level carbon monocoque compatible with electronic and mechanical groupsets
- C60—(2014) carbon tube and lug bonded frame like C40/C50 but extends Colnago's signature faceted star shape the full length of the tube and through the lugs, also using larger tubing diameters and slightly thinner walls for a frame that is slightly lighter than the C59
- C64—(2018) carbon tube and lug bonded frame similar to the C59 and C60
- C68—(2022)

=== Special-purpose frames ===
==== Cyclocross ====
Over the years, Ernesto Colnago built steel cyclocross frames for individual professional riders and did not sell any steel frames to the public. A handful have been identified, an early one based on the Colnago Super and built for Roger de Vlaeminck. This frame sold in November 2012 on eBay for approximately $1200 US. A second 1985 Colnago Super Cyclocross Team Kwantum Decosol Team ex bike Adrie Van Der Poel was not listed in any catalog or distributed via retail.

Another frame surfaced a couple of years ago, and appears to have been built in the mid to late 90s, loosely based on the Colnago Crystal, specifically labeled "Master" on the rear brake hanger. Lugs and seat stays are similar to those on the Crystal, slightly beefier tubing than other road models (32mm OD downtube, 29mm seat tube), relaxed wheelbase, top tube routing for rear brake and derailleur, traditional routing for front derailleur but no braze-on for front derailleur. Colnago bottom bracket shell. Straight mtb style threadless fork (no formal crown). No serial number stamped on dropout. Colnago factory contact unable to identify year or provide further information.

Colnago built a couple of bikes for the Italian cyclocross and MTB champion Luca Bramati. Bramati rode a yellow steel, lugless Colnago cyclocross bike in the '96 Worlds in Munich, considered to be one of the most exciting races ever, where he placed third. His bike had a front fork with a traditional brazed fork crown, and full front/rear gear cable brazings. The tubing looks just slightly oversized, and overall the bike looks quite similar to Bramati's Colnago MTB that he raced in Atlanta in the '96 Olympics.

Another may have been built for Bert Hiemstra in 1998/1999, Rabobank rider. This was a lugless steel frame, badged "Colnago Competition" in Rabobank colors, 59 cm CtT, set up with 9 speed Dura Ace and a Unicrown fork.

- Cyclocross (c 1980s) Manufactured by Alan, stamped "Colnago" name on bottom of headtube. Aluminum tubing screwed and glued to lugs. Sizing stamped in bottom bracket, no serial number on rear dropouts. Top tube ovalized for shouldering bike on transitions.
- Dual Cyclocross
- Dream CX—Production aluminum like the Dream Road with Unicrown MTB style front fork and additional bracing at headtube/downtube union.
- World Cup—
- Prestige—Early Prestige frames, all monocoque construction, had an added brace between top and seat tube for carrying the bike during cyclocross races. They also have water bottle bosses. Later frames lost this brace and gained brackets for disc brakes.
- C50 CX Rabobank Team

==== Mountain bikes ====
Although not very common or widely available in the American market, Colnago did produce a number of mountain bikes. Some featured the Master profile tubing found on the Colnago road bikes.

- Master—Gilco shaped tubing like the Master road bike, Unicrown fork hard tail mountain bike
- Maxim
- CF series CF12 Ferrari collaboration

== See also ==
- List of bicycle parts
- List of Italian companies

== Bibliography ==
- Negri, Rino (1985). Quando la bici è arte [When the bike is art (The story of Ernesto Colnago)] (in Italian). Legnano, Italy: Edizione Landoni. p. 216.
