= Jan Plantaz =

Dutch cyclist (1930–1974)

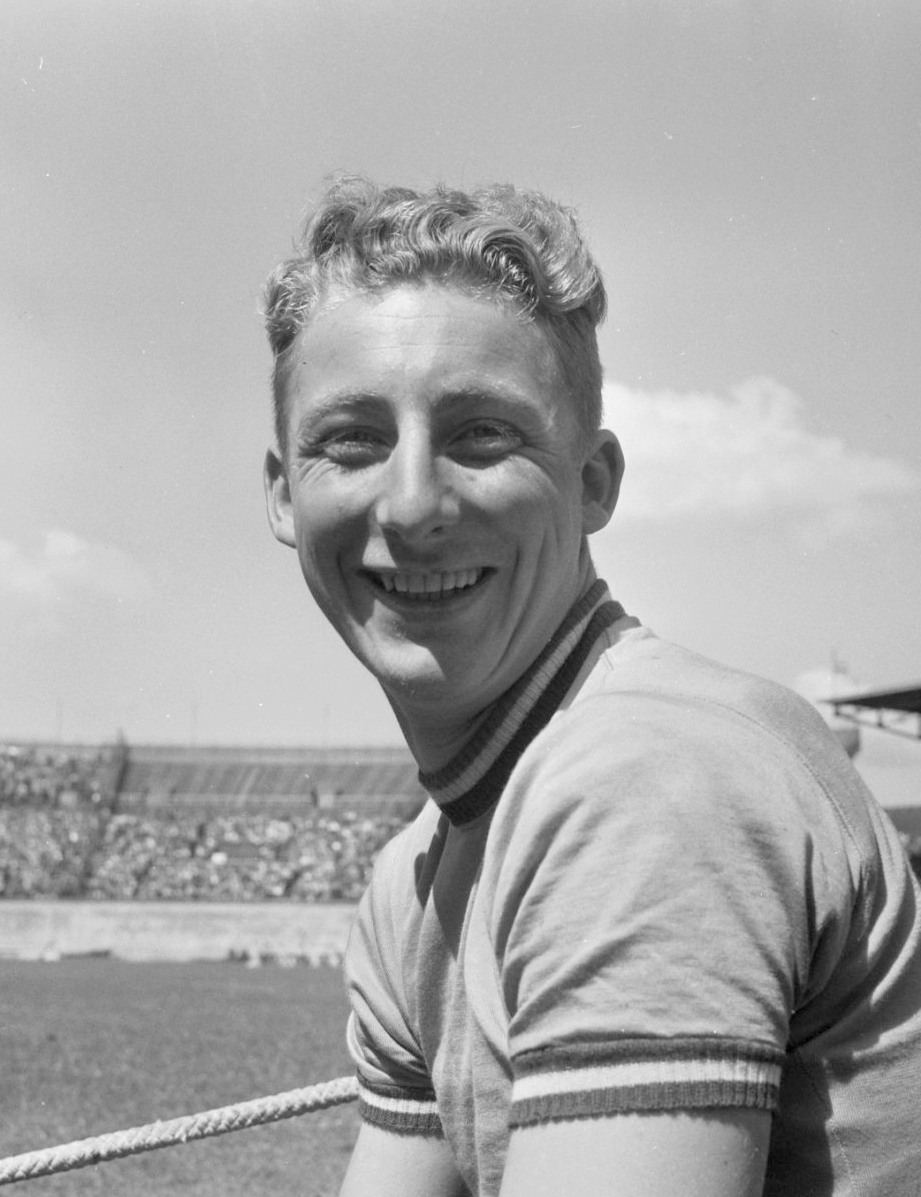
- Jan Plantaz in 1952

Personal information
- Full name: Johannes Marinus Plantaz
- Born: 3 December 1930 Geldrop, the Netherlands
- Died: 10 February 1974 (aged 43) Eindhoven, the Netherlands

Cycling career
- Sport: Cycling
Medal record
Representing the Netherlands
UCI Road World Championships
| Bronze medal – third place | 1951 Varese | Road race |

Johannes "Jan" Marinus Plantaz (3 December 1930 – 10 February 1974) was a road and track cyclist from the Netherlands. He competed at the 1952 Summer Olympics in the road race (individual and team events) and 4 km team pursuit and finished in 22nd, 5th and 8th place, respectively. He won a bronze medal in the road race at the 1951 UCI Road World Championships.

He died from a heart attack during training.

== See also ==
- List of Dutch Olympic cyclists
