= Nivea–Fuchs =

Italian professional cycling team that existed from 1954 to 1956

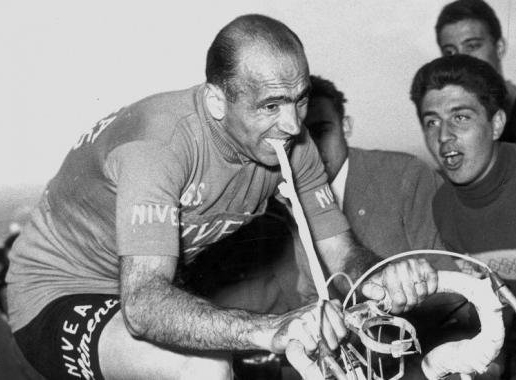
- Fiorenzo Magni at the 1956 Giro d'Italia

Team information
- Registered: Italy
- Founded: 1954
- Disbanded: 1956
- Discipline: Road
- Bicycles: Fuchs

Team name history
- 1954–1955 1955 Giro d'Italia 1956: Nivea–Fuchs; Clément–Fuchs; Nivea–Fuchs–Clément

Nivea–Fuchs was an Italian professional cycling team that existed from 1954 to 1956. The team was formed when the Ganna team told its leader, Fiorenzo Magni, that it would not be able to continue and he gained the backing of the German cosmetics company Nivea to be the main sponsor of a new team. It was the first non-bicycle industry company team sponsor. Magni won the general classification of the 1955 Giro d'Italia with the team.
