= Ernesto Colnago =

Italian entrepreneur and inventor

Ernesto Colnago (born 9 February 1932) is an Italian entrepreneur and inventor who founded in 1952 and still runs the bicycle manufacturing company Colnago Ernesto & C. S.r.l.

== Biography ==
Colnago began working for the Gloria Bicycle Company in Milan in 1945 when he was 13 years old. He subsequently raced their bikes.
