= 1951 UCI Road World Championships =

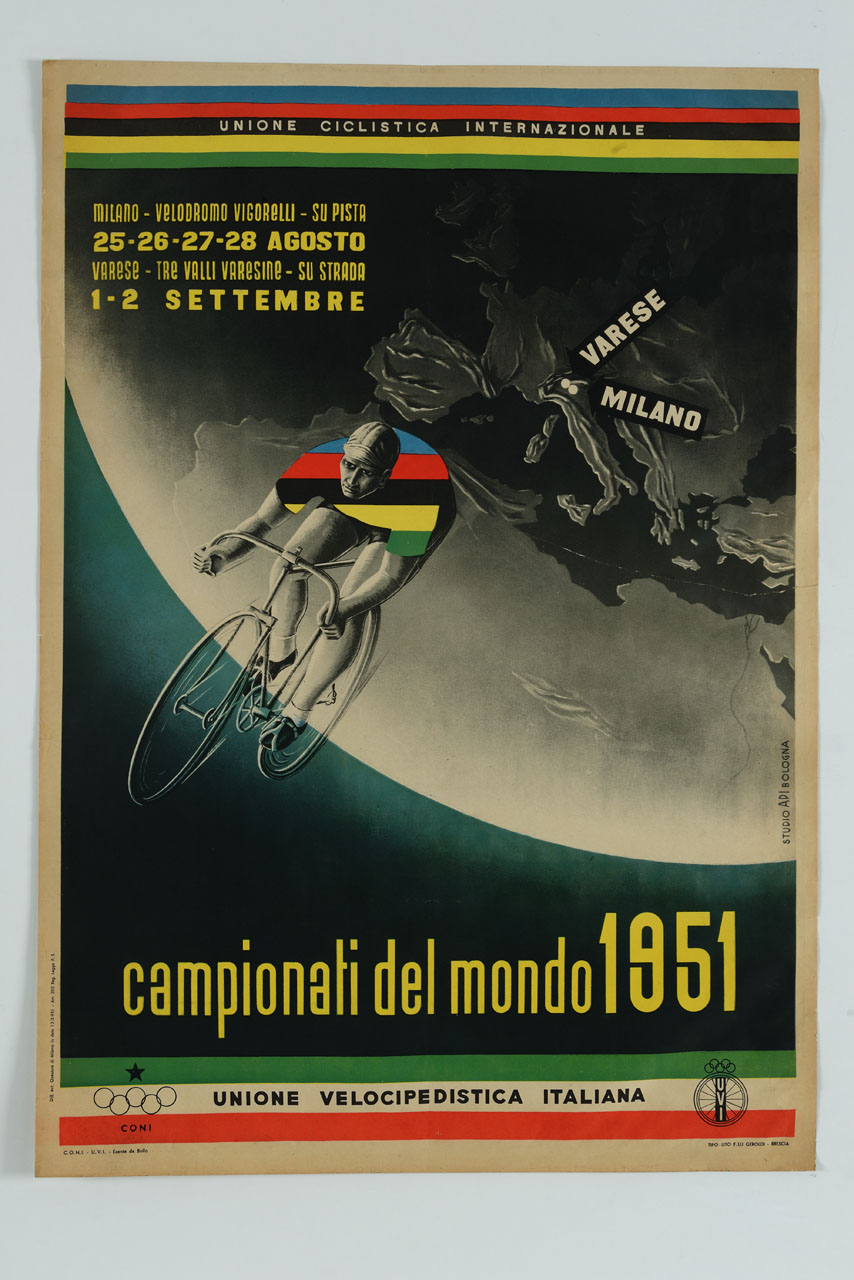

- Venue: Varese, Italy
- Dates: 1 and 2 September 1951
- Coordinates: 45°49′N 08°50′E
- Events: 2

The 1951 UCI Road World Championships was the 24th edition of the UCI Road World Championships. It took place on Saturday 1 and Sunday 2 September 1951 in Varese, Italy.

The amateurs had to complete 7 laps of about 24.6 kilometres on Saturday for a total distance of 172 km, the professionals on Sunday 12 laps or about 295 kilometres.

Swiss rider Ferdi Kübler became world champion in a group sprint, ahead of Italians Fiorenzo Magni and Antonio Bevilacqua. In the amateurs' race, the Italians celebrated a double success with Gianni Ghidini beating his compatriot Rino Benedetti and Dutchman Jan Plantaz in a bunch sprint.

In the same period, the 1950 UCI Track Cycling World Championships was organized in the Stade Velodromo Vigorelli in Milan, Italy.

== Events Summary ==
Event	Gold		Silver		Bronze	
Men's Events
Professional Road Race	Ferdinand Kübler; Switzerland	7h 49' 54"	Fiorenzo Magni; Italy	s.t.	Antonio Bevilacqua; Italy	s.t.
Amateur Road Race	Gianni Ghidini; Italy	-	Rino Benedetti; Italy	-	Johannes Plantaz; Netherlands	-
