= Pepsi-Cola (cycling team) =

Cycling teams with the name Pepsi-Cola, sponsored by the American food producer PepsiCo, include:

- Vittadello (cycling team), known as Pepsi-Cola in 1968
- Pepsi-Cola (cycling team, 1969), known as Pepsi-Cola in 1969
- Pepsi-Cola (cycling team, 1987–1989), known as Pepsi-Cola from 1987 to 1989
