= Leo–Chlorodont =

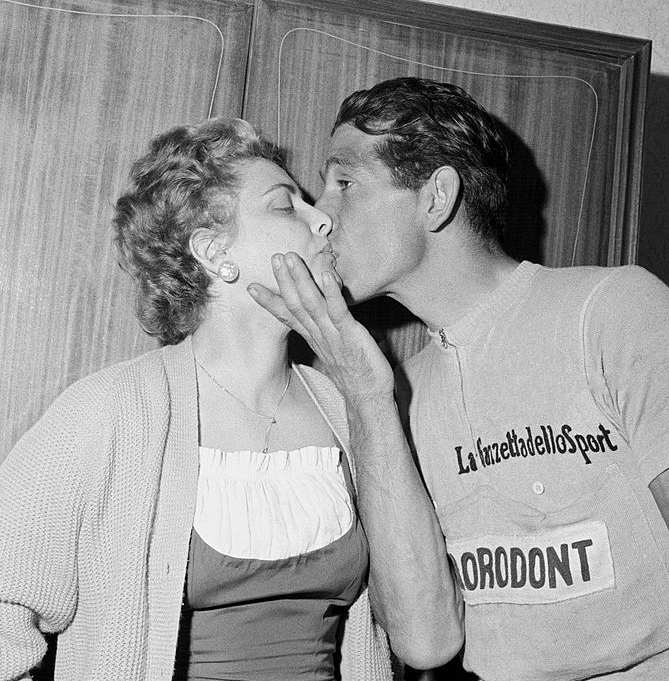
- Gastone Nencini with his wife Bianca at the 1957 Giro d'Italia

Team information
- Registered: Italy
- Founded: 1955
- Disbanded: 1958
- Discipline: Road

Team name history
- 1955–1957 1958: Leo–Chlorodont; Chlorodont–Leo

Leo–Chlorodont was an Italian professional cycling team that existed from 1955 to 1958. Its sponsors were Italian hand cream Leo and German toothpaste Chlorodont. Gastone Nencini won the general classification of the 1957 Giro d'Italia with the team.
